= 2010s in music =

This article is an overview of the major events and trends in popular music in the 2010s.

== Musical trends ==
By the mid-2010s, the hushed style of vocal delivery commonly used in indie music garnered widespread popularity among pop artists, used often by Selena Gomez, Lana Del Rey, Lorde and Birdy. The Guardian dubbed this style "whisperpop", characterized by subdued vocals, muted notes and breathy intensity.

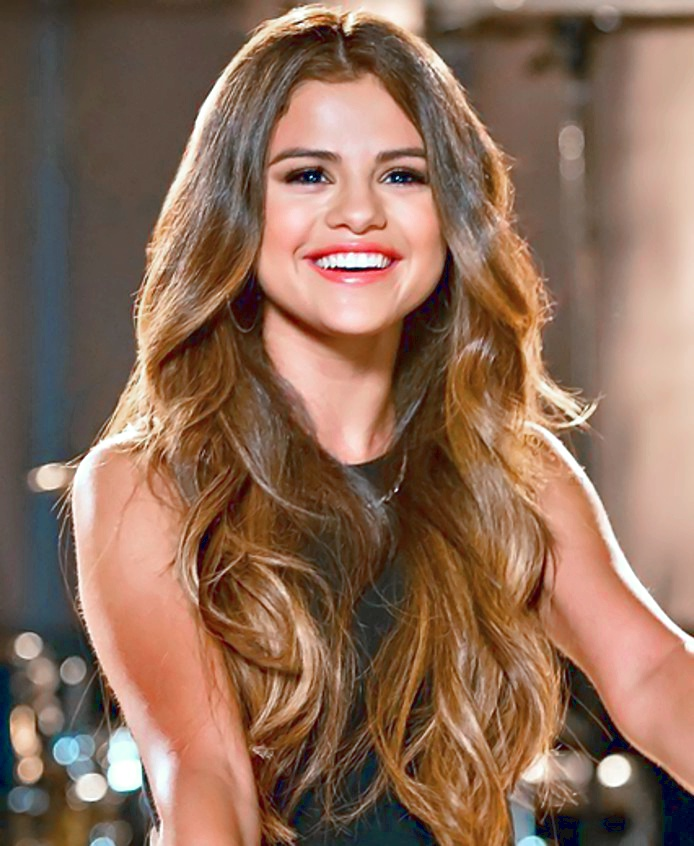
Selena Gomez gained global popularity in the 2010s, due in part to her hushed vocal style.

Traditional instruments, such as the mandolin, dulcimer, ukulele, bongos, and accordion, were used more often, especially by indie rock musicians and singer-songwriters, including Mumford and Sons, Vance Joy, Phillip Phillips, and the Lumineers, along with country players, such as Chris Stapleton and Zac Brown Band.

Adult contemporary music was successful on the charts. Pop acts like Taylor Swift, Justin Bieber, Bruno Mars, Ed Sheeran, Adele, P!nk, Shawn Mendes, Kelly Clarkson, and Maroon 5 achieved a No. 1 single during the decade. Artists like Sara Bareilles, Jason Mraz, Michael Bublé, Charlie Puth, Colbie Caillat, Christina Perri, CeeLo Green, and Shawn Mendes all incorporated soul, pop rock, and folk into their music.

Throughout the 2010s, hip-hop grew as a genre. In 2017, with the increase in streaming services influence over the Billboard Hot 100, rap music became the most popular genre in the US in its 4th decade of growth, surpassing rock and pop music. Artists like Drake, Kendrick Lamar, Future, Chance the Rapper, Nicki Minaj, Travis Scott, Playboi Carti, J. Cole, Gucci Mane, Migos, Young Thug, Lil B, Tyler, the Creator, ASAP Rocky, 21 Savage, Cardi B, Big Sean, Lil Uzi Vert, Lil Yachty, XXXTentacion and Juice WRLD all rose to prominence in this decade. In the decade, movements like trap music, cloud rap, drill music, and emo hip hop became mainstream. The 2010s are also notable for the increasing prominence of rap producers; examples being Young Chop, Sonny Digital, DJ Mustard, DJ Khaled and Pi'erre Bourne.

Progressive and experimental rock enjoyed some popularity, mainly in the second half of the decade. Artists such as Nothing More, Highly Suspect, Twelve Foot Ninja, Dead Letter Circus, and Marmozets, and DIY ethic bands, including Bad Omens, Sylar, Æges, and Silver Snakes, enjoyed success through concerts and streaming services.

EDM became more mainstream mostly due to the release of Britney Spears's Blackout (2007); some 2010s successes include David Guetta, Skrillex, Steve Aoki, Swedish House Mafia, Headhunterz, Wildstylez, Da Tweekaz, Clean Bandit, Major Lazer, DVBBS, Avicii, Alesso, Owl City, the Chainsmokers, Calvin Harris, DJ Snake, Diplo, ShockOne, Drumsound & Bassline Smith, Blasterjaxx, Martin Garrix, Marshmello, Alan Walker and Zedd. The prominence of novel EDM genres in the pop sphere like future bass and EDM trap resulted in newer styles and innovations within the dance-pop sound, though house genres like future house, tropical house, and electro house remained the most common regardless. The latter was especially popular in the early part of the decade continuing from the late 2000s. Reggaetón and dancehall were other major influences for many dance-pop hits.

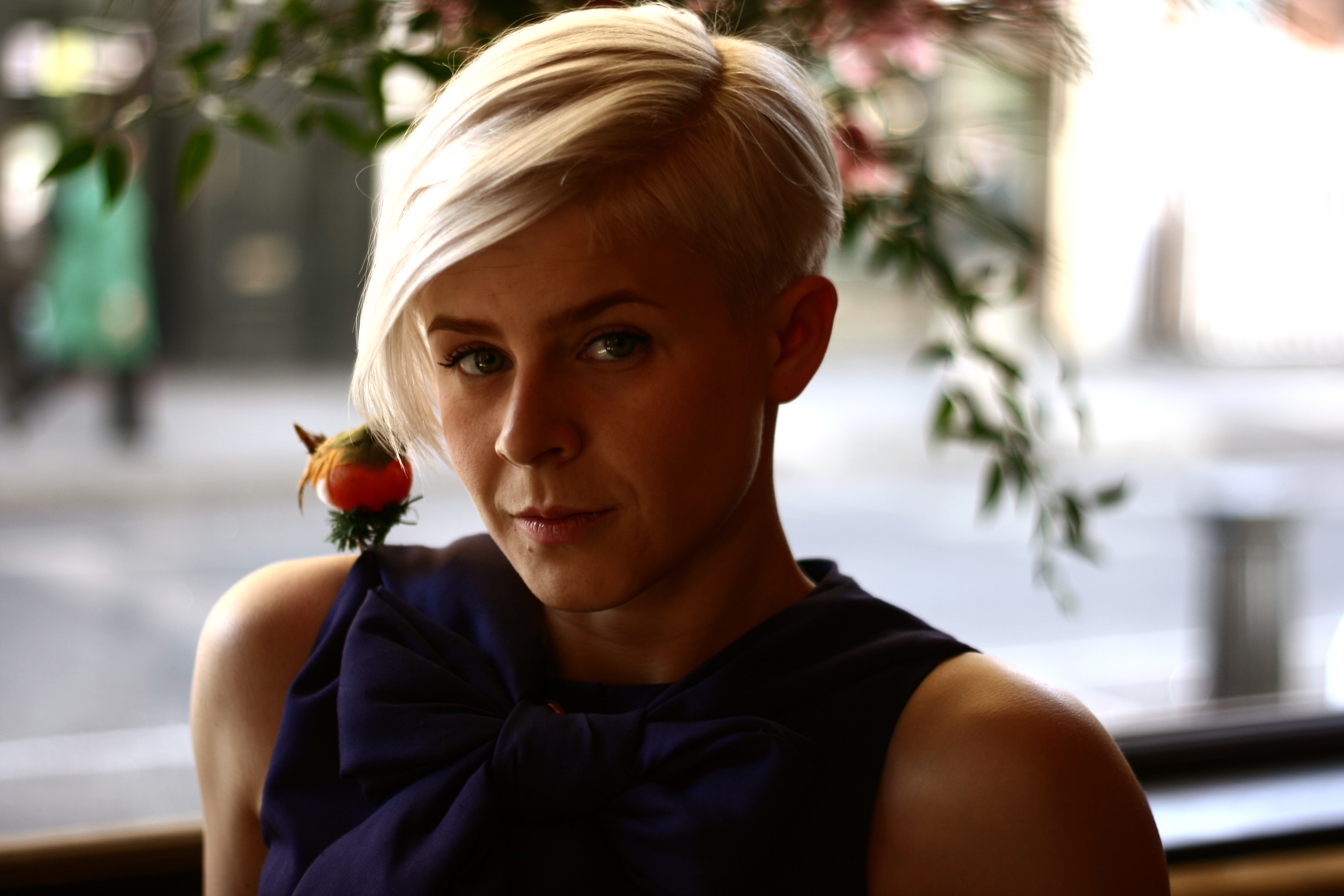
Robyn, the Swedish singer, songwriter, record producer and DJ

The genres of Europop and Eurodance also achieved commercial success, evidenced by Swedish producer Max Martin's ubiquity in the decade's most successful pop albums. Katy Perry's Teenage Dream (2010) drew heavily from this style and became the first album by a female artist in history to release five number one U.S. singles. Europop and electronica were used more extensively in the early 2010s as a result of the success of Lady Gaga and disk jockeys like David Guetta and Calvin Harris also influencing the work of female solo acts like Rihanna, Robyn, and Kesha. Some of the best-selling songs of the decade, including "Only Girl (In the World)" and "S&M" by Rihanna, were strongly influenced by Eurodance. In 2012, a large number of songs by American instrumentalists featured quintessential Eurodance elements, especially synthesizer and strong beats during the chorus mixed with rapping or vocals for verses. Flo Rida, Pitbull, LMFAO, and Black Eyed Peas were popular hip-house acts from the early half of the 2010s.

Teen pop made a comeback throughout the decade, with the likes of Miley Cyrus, Demi Lovato, Selena Gomez, Justin Bieber and Ariana Grande. Like their predecessors Britney Spears, Christina Aguilera, and Justin Timberlake, who rose to fame in the late 1990s and early 2000s, most of these stars were associated with Disney Channel and Nickelodeon at the genesis of their careers. An exception is Canadian artist Justin Bieber who rose to fame through YouTube and social media. Throughout the 2010s, they expanded control over their careers and came of age with their music to varying degrees of success, and many teen pop musicians outside the former companies have continued to launch promising careers.

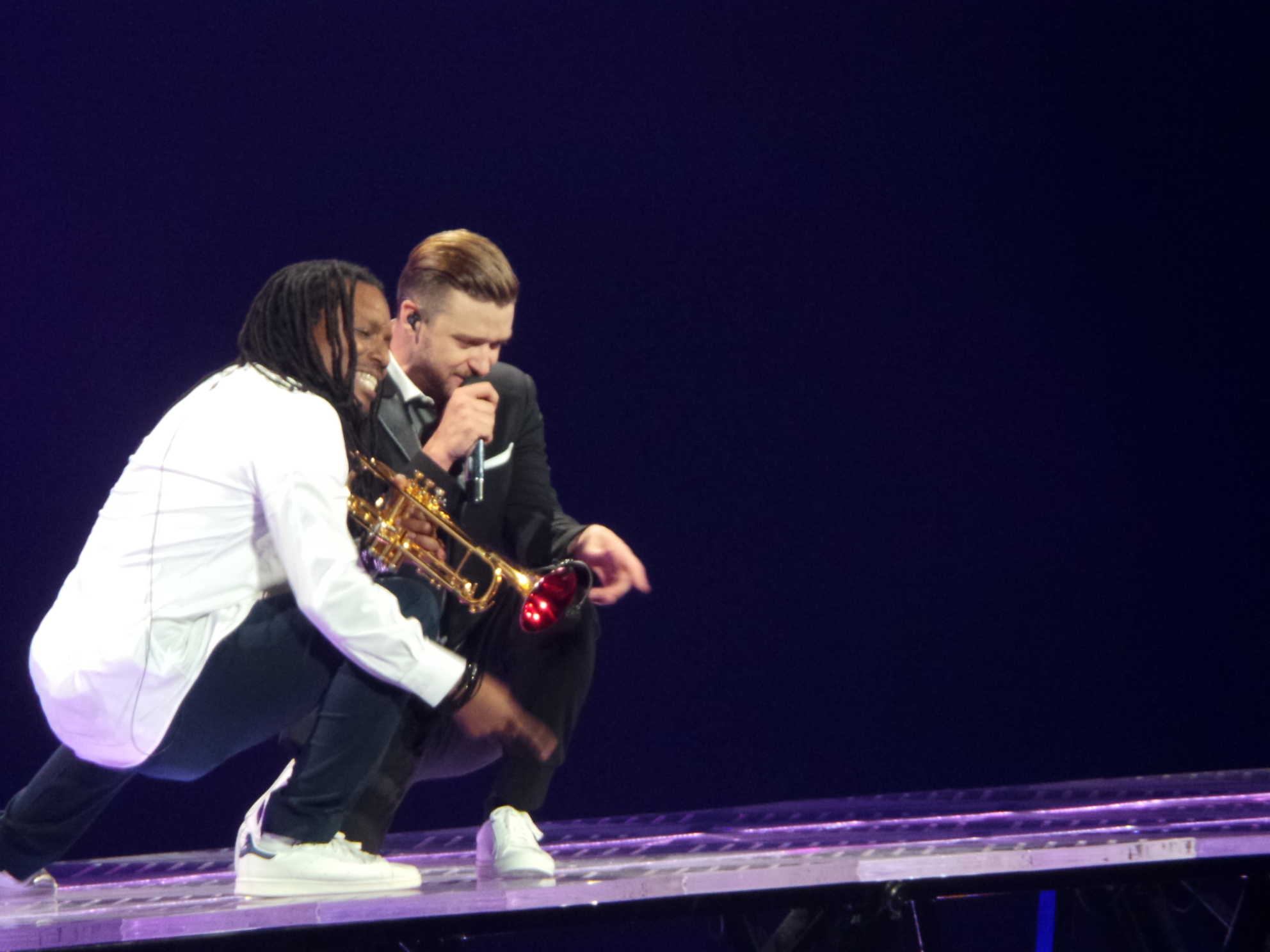
Justin Timberlake performing on his 20/20 Experience Tour in Charlotte, North Carolina

Throughout the 2010s, different movements in music and the music industry were formed because of the rise of social media such as YouTube, TikTok, and SoundCloud. Some new genres of music were introduced, such as vaporwave, whilst other previously "underground" genres such as lofi hip-hop and bedroom pop received increased mainstream exposure. Vaporwave music is one of the first genres of music that has an aesthetic heavily influenced by elements from the 1980s and 1990s. Bedroom pop grew in popularity in the mid to late 2010s on platforms such as YouTube with amateur artists rising to fame making pop music from their bedroom using inexpensive music creation equipment and software such as GarageBand. Elements of some of these genres began influencing more mainstream pop music by the late 2010s, continuing into the 2020s.

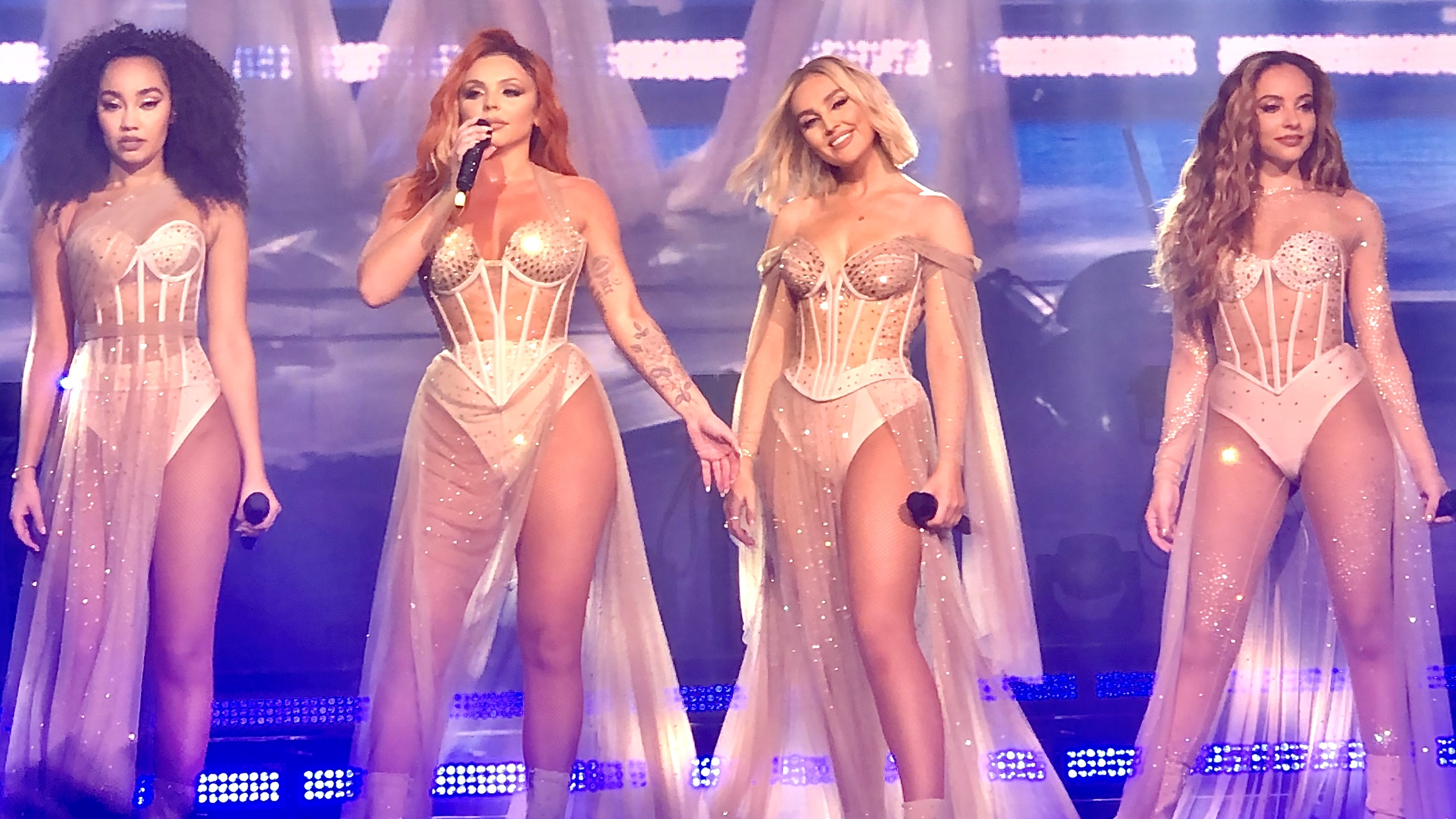
In the 2010s, British girl group Little Mix was cited for helping the girl band renaissance in the UK during the late 2000s and into the early 2010s. They are also recognized as one of the most successful girl groups from that decade.

Since 2011, boy bands and girl groups have returned to mainstream popularity for the first time after the early 2000s, with the most popular examples being British-Irish boy band One Direction and American boy band Big Time Rush. A new generation of successful girl groups was ushered in by acts such as Little Mix and Fifth Harmony. In addition to this, K-Pop groups, benefiting from high visibility on social media and video sharing sites like YouTube, began to capitalize on their viral power and monetize overseas markets by conducting sold-out tours in Western markets during the mid-2010s. Korean acts such as BigBang, Exo, and BTS sold out US tours with little to no promotion or support from mainstream media sources like TV or radio airplay.

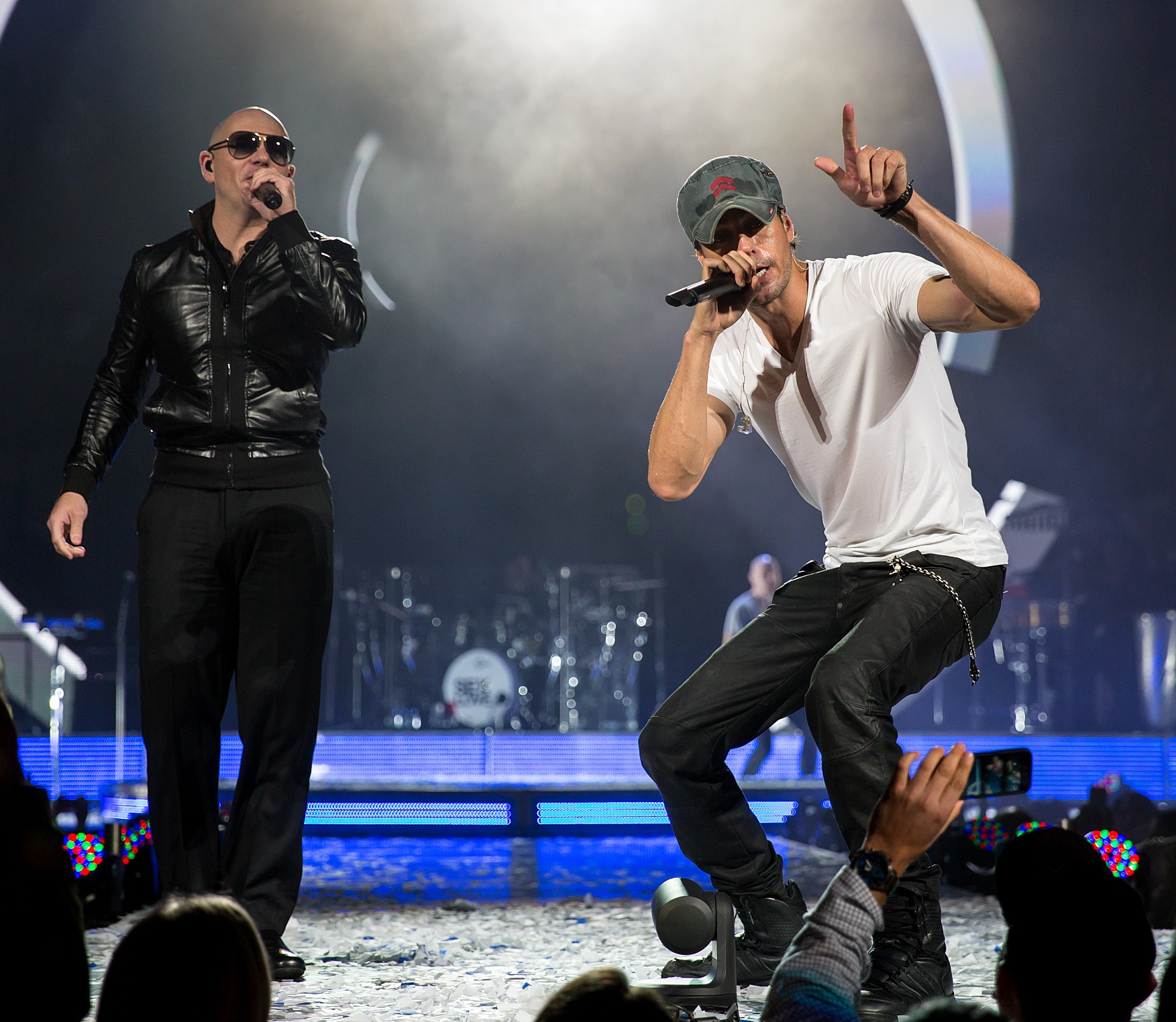
Pitbull and Enrique Iglesias recorded the track "Dirty Dancer", which was released as the second single of Iglesias's album Euphoria and became his seventh Hot Dance Club Play chart topper, tying him with Prince and Michael Jackson as the male with the most No. 1 dance singles.

In Latin America, Latin pop remained the main subgenre. Tropical, reggaeton, moombahton, and soca were also popular genres while pop rock continued to be successful. In December 2016, Billboard magazine named Enrique Iglesias the 14th most successful and top male dance club artist of all time. "Despacito" by Luis Fonsi and Daddy Yankee became the highest-certified song of all-time in the United States after receiving a 13× platinum certification by the Recording Industry Association of America for units of over 13 million sales plus track-equivalent streams.

Soundtracks from films topped the charts this decade as well, with number 1 singles from Lady Gaga, Bradley Cooper, Wiz Khalifa, Charlie Puth, Justin Timberlake and Pharrell Williams.

Dubstep and drumstep became widespread subgenres in the early 2010s on both sides of the Atlantic Ocean, especially in its native United Kingdom. There, other electronic subgenres, like grime, footwork and trap, also grew in popularity. Drumstep continued its success while hardstyle became mainstream in Australia and United States due to the success of music festivals, such as The Sound of Q-dance and Defqon 1. Grime experienced a resurgence beginning in 2014, initiated by the success of Meridian Dan's "German Whip" featuring Big H and Jme.

In Asia, popular music continued to be influenced by Western pop music. As with the past several decades, C-pop, J-pop and K-pop continued to be successful in the Far East. In J-pop, image songs and the influence of anime on widespread music grew since the late 2000s. K-pop's popularity continued to increase around the world throughout the decade and found wider recognition in Western markets. The media entertainment brand Billboard, responsible for tabulating the Billboard Hot 100 and 200, inaugurated its own K-Pop chart and column presented weekly on its Billboard.com site. The Billboard K-Town column, launched in 2013, continues to report on K-pop music; artists, concerts, chart information and news events. In 2015, the US iTunes store added a K-Pop genre category. Major streaming services such as Apple Music and Spotify both added K-pop categories to their repertoire to cater demand. In 2018, some K-pop artists from the Republic of Korea like Red Velvet even made a performance at the East Pyongyang Grand Theatre in the Democratic People's Republic of Korea. In India, Indian pop, rock, and filmi continued to be mainstream. In the United Arab Emirates, Arabic pop, Arabic hip-hop, rock and metal continued in popularity.

Artists like Ellie Goulding, Sam Smith, Jessie J, and Emeli Sandé from the U.K. started to become highly successful and gained popularity from crossover hits in the U.S. Ed Sheeran's "Shape of You" and "Perfect" and Adele's "Rolling in the Deep", "Someone Like You", and "Set Fire to the Rain" all reached the No. 1 spot of the Billboard Hot 100 in this decade. Taio Cruz also garnered successful hits. "Dynamite" and "Break Your Heart" were successful singles with the latter reaching the top spot of the Billboard Hot 100.

== North America ==
=== Pop ===
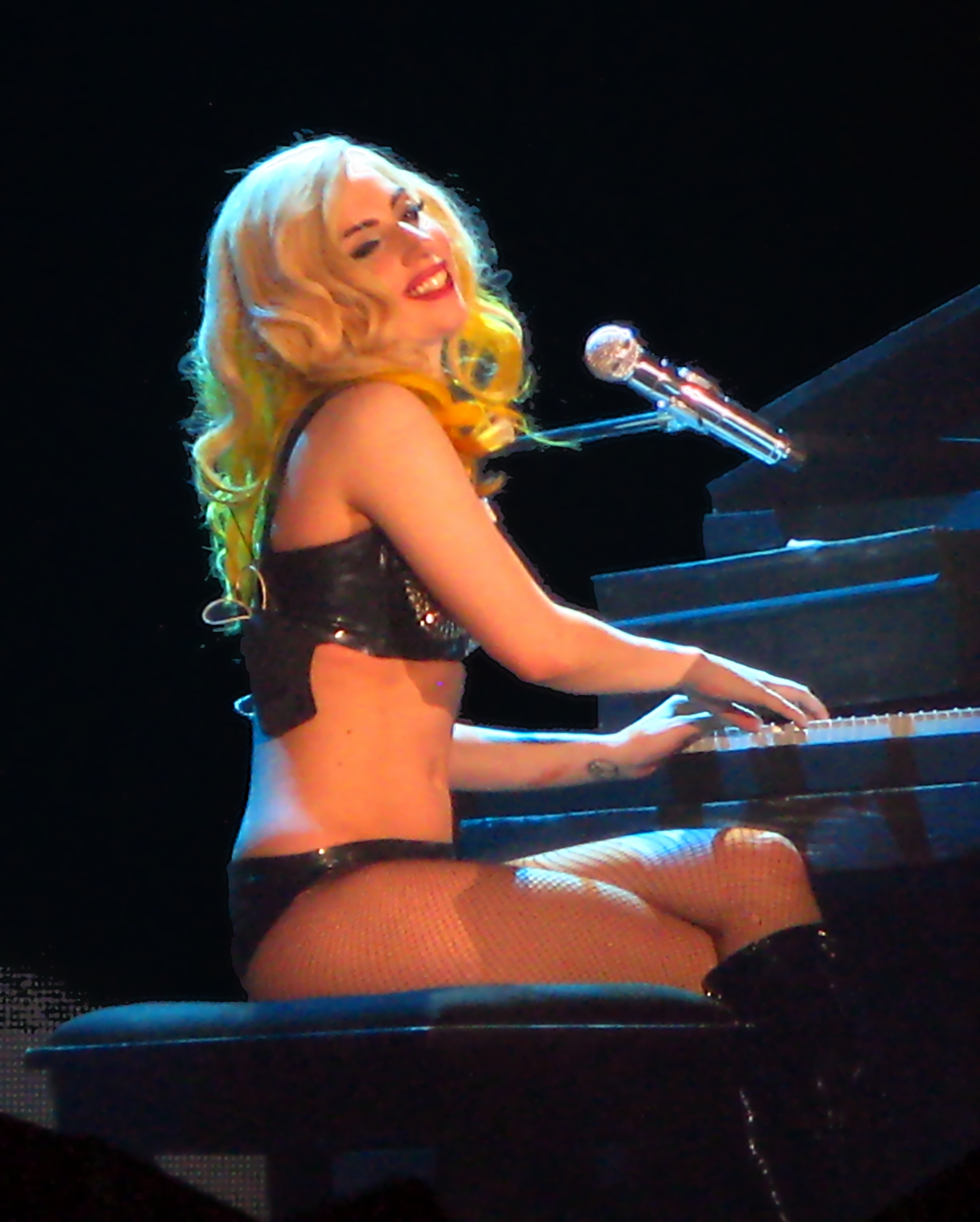
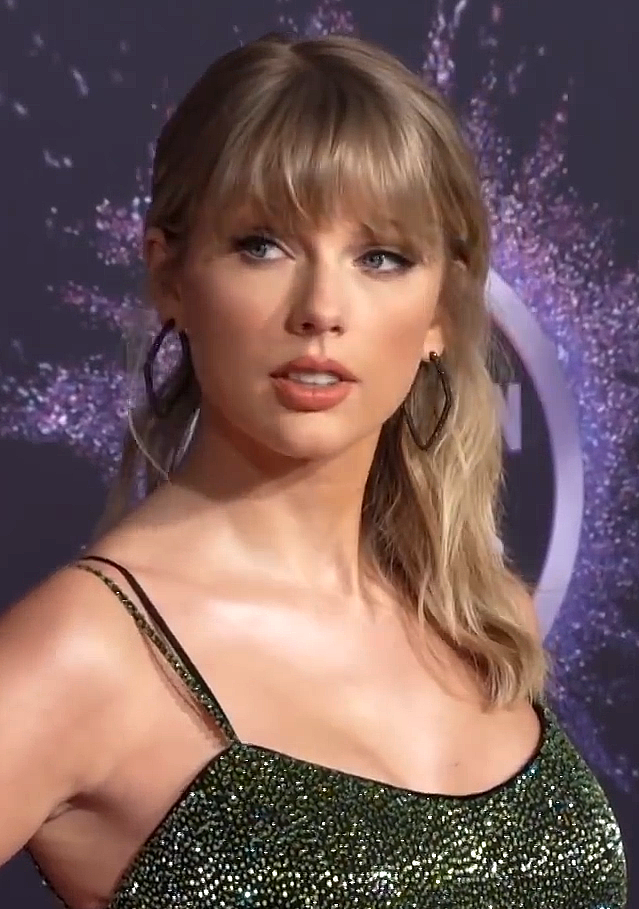
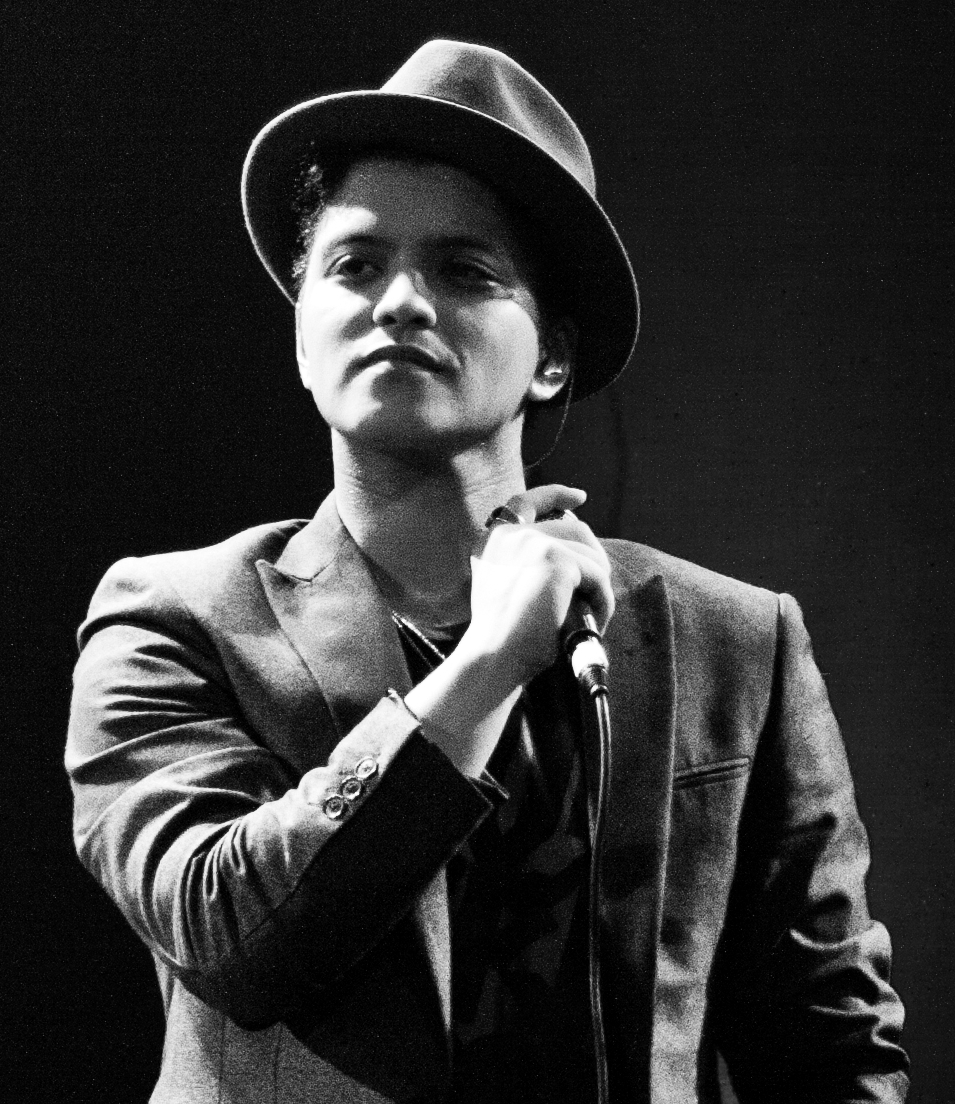
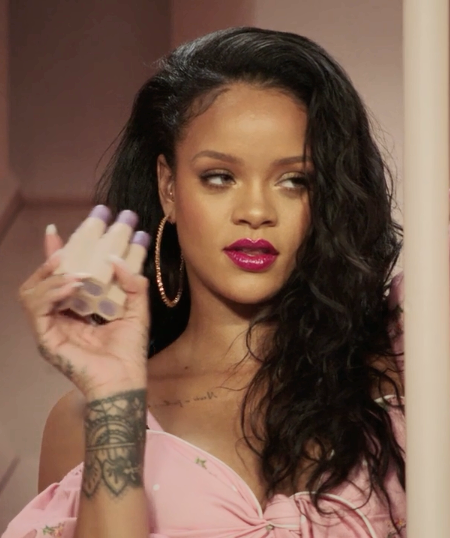
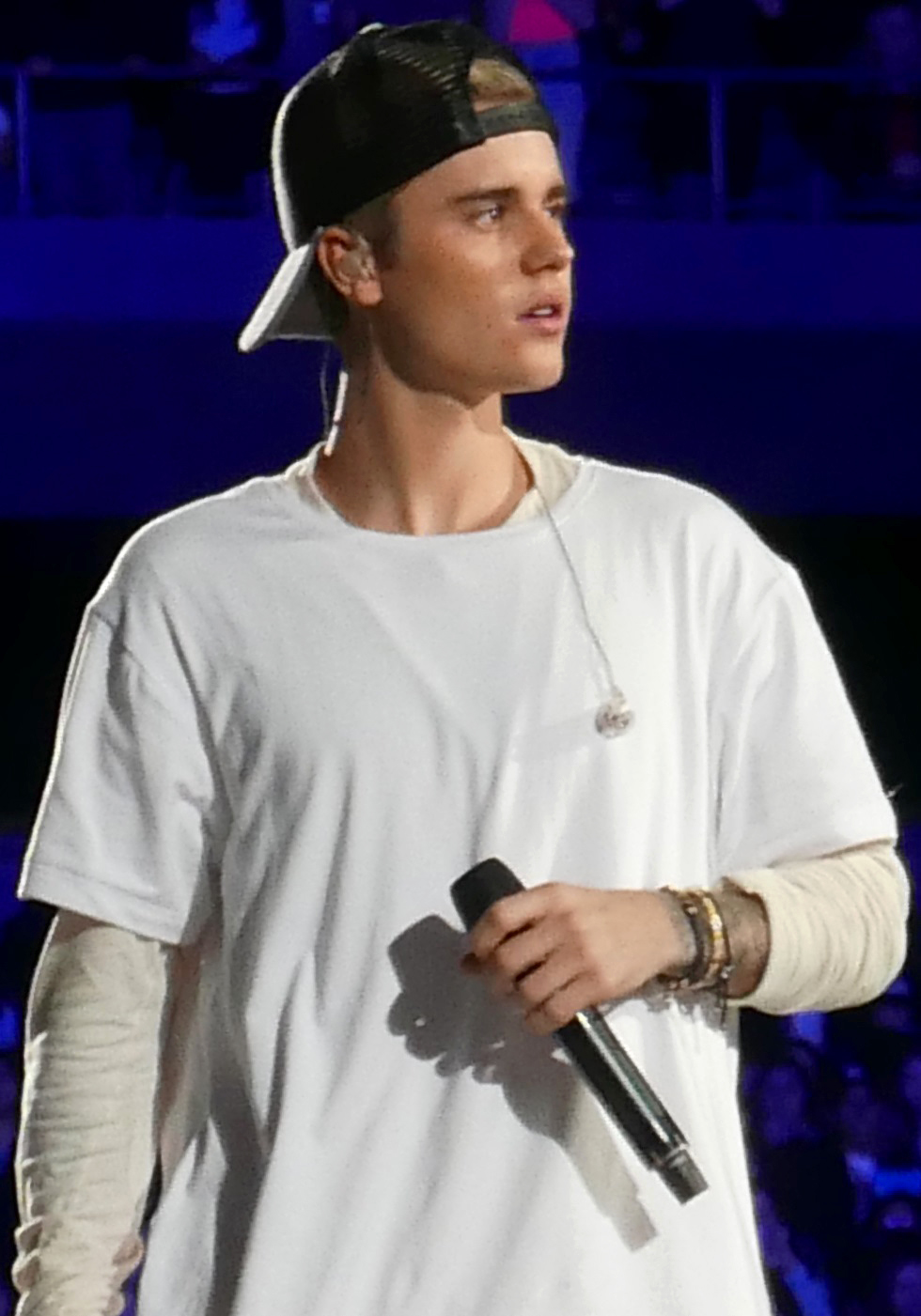
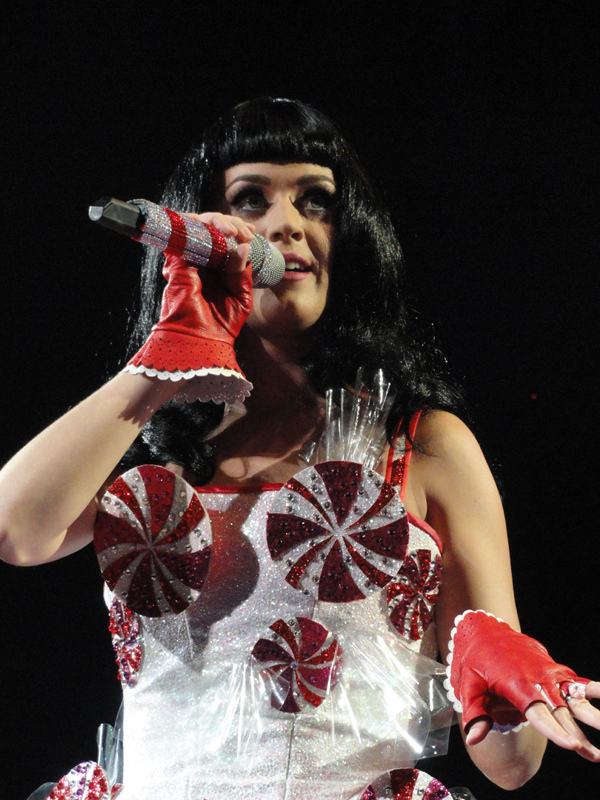
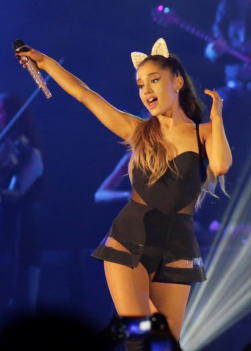
Some of the most successful North American pop artists of the decade include Lady Gaga, Taylor Swift, Bruno Mars, Rihanna, Justin Bieber, Katy Perry and Ariana Grande; Swift was named the Artist of the Decade by the American Music Awards.

Pop music remained popular in this decade due to dance-pop, electropop and synth-pop. Artists like Lady Gaga, Taylor Swift, Katy Perry, Maroon 5, Justin Bieber, Ariana Grande, Miley Cyrus, Kesha, Selena Gomez and Rihanna were very popular. Chart-topping pop songs this decade include Britney Spears' "Hold It Against Me", Gaga's "Born This Way", Rihanna's "We Found Love", Swift's "Shake It Off", Bieber's "Sorry", Carly Rae Jepsen's "Call Me Maybe", Grande's "Thank U, Next", Billie Eilish's "Bad Guy", and Gomez's "Lose You to Love Me".

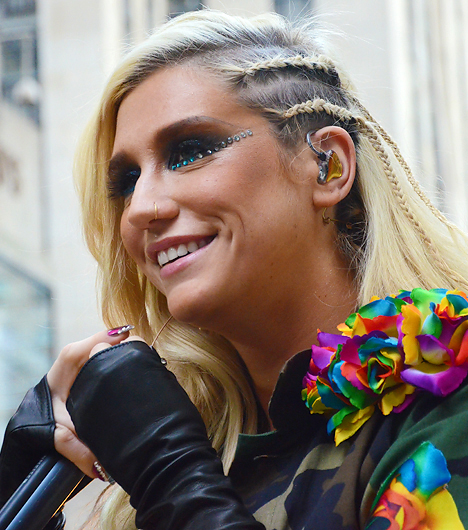
Kesha performing on the American television program Today in 2012

Canadian singer Shawn Mendes was another artist who dominated the pop charts in the US this decade. Jonas Brothers made a successful comeback in 2019. Also from this decade were critically acclaimed works from Beyoncé, Lana Del Rey, Bruno Mars, Taylor Swift, Kendrick Lamar, and Kanye West among others. New pop artists that emerged in that decade were Mike Posner, Ariana Grande, Maroon 5, Halsey, Meghan Trainor, Bebe Rexha, Tori Kelly, Alessia Cara, Adam Lambert, Charlie Puth, Shawn Mendes, Omi, Kiiara, Jon Bellion, Julia Michaels, Rachel Platten, Maggie Rogers, Hailee Steinfeld, Lauv, Daya, Camila Cabello, Fun, Bonnie McKee, Bazzi, Alec Benjamin, Billie Eilish, and Ava Max.

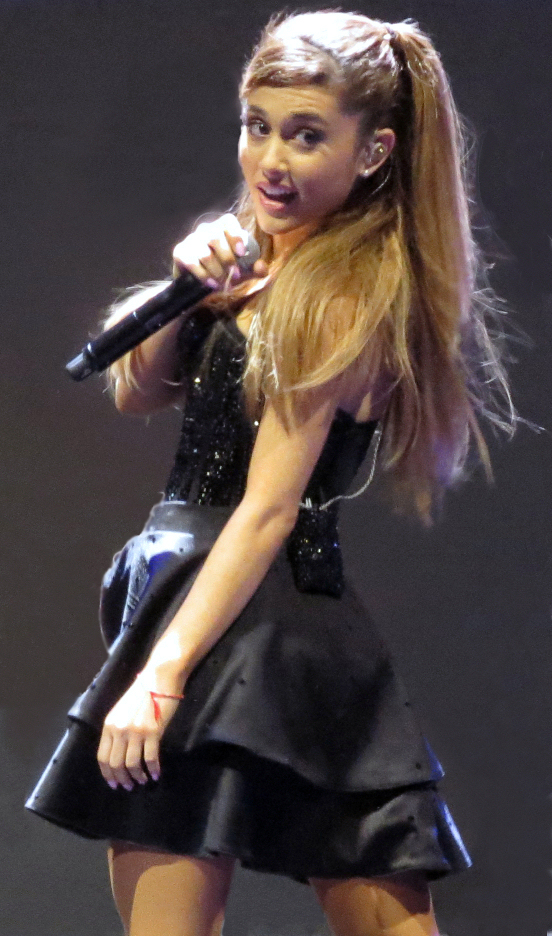
Ariana Grande was one of the most successful singers of the decade.

Teenage Dream, Katy Perry's sophomore album, released on August 24, 2010, spawned 5 consecutive number-one singles. It was the second album in history to produce 5 number-one singles, the first by a woman to achieve this. Those number-one singles were "California Gurls", "Teenage Dream", "Firework", "E.T.", and "Last Friday Night (T.G.I.F.)".

Rihanna earned the most No. 1 singles in the decade (nine), spending 41 weeks at the top of the chart, followed by Katy Perry with 8 No. 1 singles at a 26-week reign and Bruno Mars with 7 No. 1 singles leading 32 weeks. Justin Bieber and Taylor Swift both had five No. 1 singles this decade, Bieber spending 23 weeks at No. 1 and Swift 18 weeks. Adele followed with four No. 1 singles at her name spending 24 weeks at the top. Kesha earned three No. 1 singles in this decade, spending 13 weeks at the top of the Billboard Hot 100. Among all those songs who reached No. 1 singles this decade "Tik Tok", "Rolling in the Deep", "Just the Way You Are", "Poker Face", "Shake It Off", and "Dark Horse" were some of the best-selling singles in the digital era.

Taylor Swift became the first artist in history to have four albums debut on the Billboard 200 with each selling over 1 million copies; they are: Speak Now (2010), Red (2012), 1989 (2014) and Reputation (2017); with Lover (2019), Swift became the first female artist to debut six albums on the chart, each opening with more than 500,000 copies. The American Music Awards crowned Swift as the Artist of the Decade, while Billboard named her the Woman of the Decade.

In this decade, Swift and Beyoncé became the only two female acts in history to achieve six consecutive number-one debuts on the Billboard 200 chart; Swift did it with Fearless (2008), Speak Now, Red, 1989, Reputation and Lover, while Beyoncé with Dangerously in Love (2003), B'Day (2006), I Am... Sasha Fierce (2008), 4 (2011), Beyoncé (2013) and Lemonade (2016).

Madonna became the first artist to achieve 50 number-one songs on any Billboard chart, in the Dance Club Songs chart, pulling ahead of runner-up, George Strait, who has 44 number-one songs on the Hot Country Songs chart.

Ariana Grande became the first solo artist to occupy the top three spots on the Billboard Hot 100 with "7 Rings" at number one, "Break Up with Your Girlfriend, I'm Bored" debuting at number two, and "Thank U, Next" rising to number three, and the overall second artist to do so since the Beatles did in 1964 when they occupied the top five spots.

Comebacks were also made in the pop industry with acts such as the Backstreet Boys whose album DNA topped the Billboard Charts the week it was released. Big Time Rush rose to prominence during this decade.

=== Rock ===
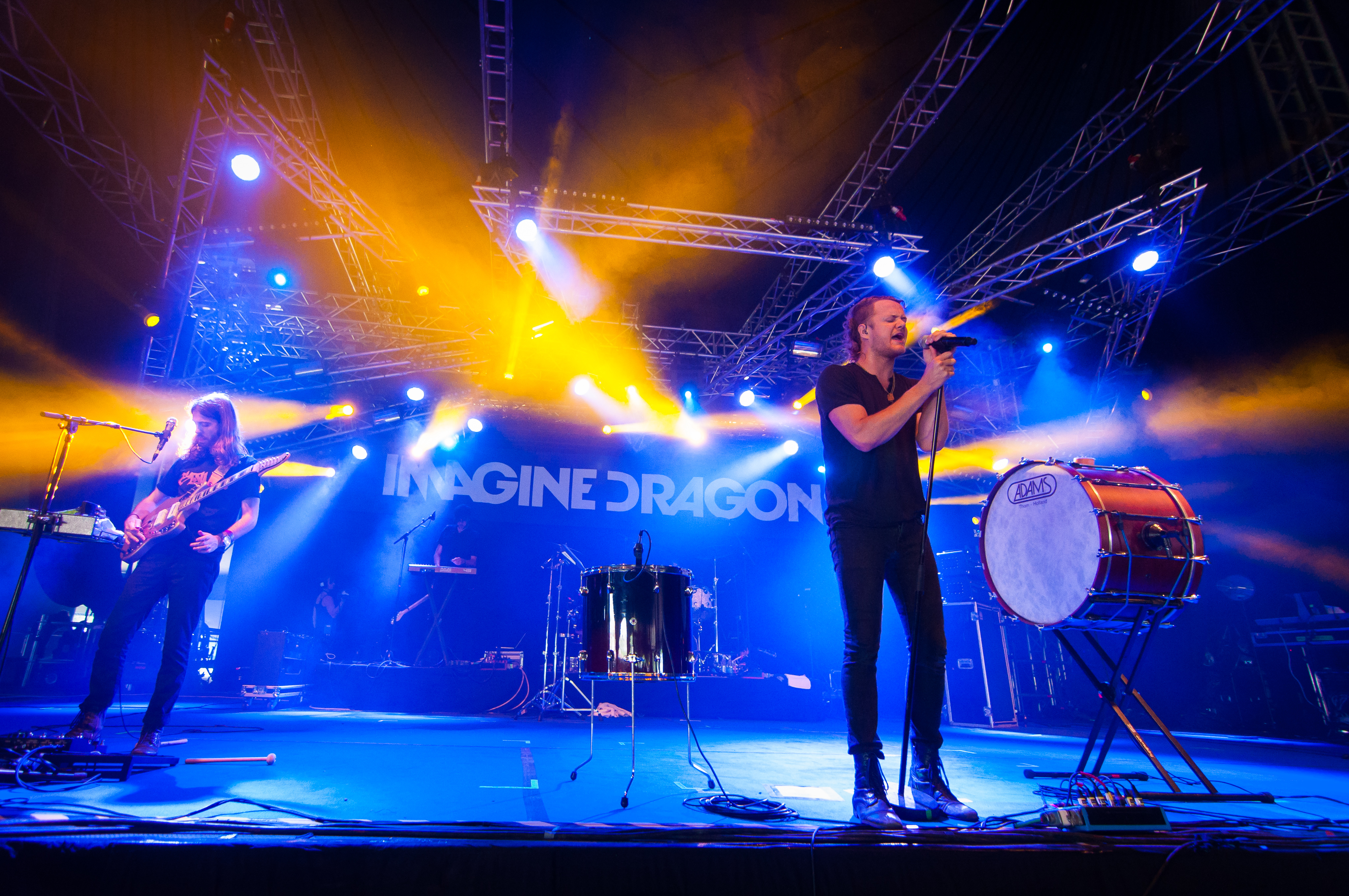
Imagine Dragons were an instant success after the release of their debut album, Night Visions.

Rock remained popular in the 2010s, despite having declined in chart presence since the late 2000s alongside changes in radio format. These changes were driven by the decline in compact discs and the rise of downloads in the music industry, which prompted a focus on top 40 music. Mainstream rock since the early 2010s became softer and more refined because of indie rock. Rock was reportedly still the most widely consumed genre in the United States during 2014 and 2015. The decade also saw the return of successful rock artists from the past, including AC/DC, David Bowie, Metallica, Stone Temple Pilots, Red Hot Chili Peppers, Pearl Jam, Nine Inch Nails, Blink-182, Radiohead, and Green Day. All of these acts had albums debut within the top 5. In particular, English rock artist David Bowie experienced his most commercially successful period since the 1980s with two U.S. top 5 albums, The Next Day (2013) and Blackstar (2016), the latter being released shortly before his death.

==== Alternative rock ====
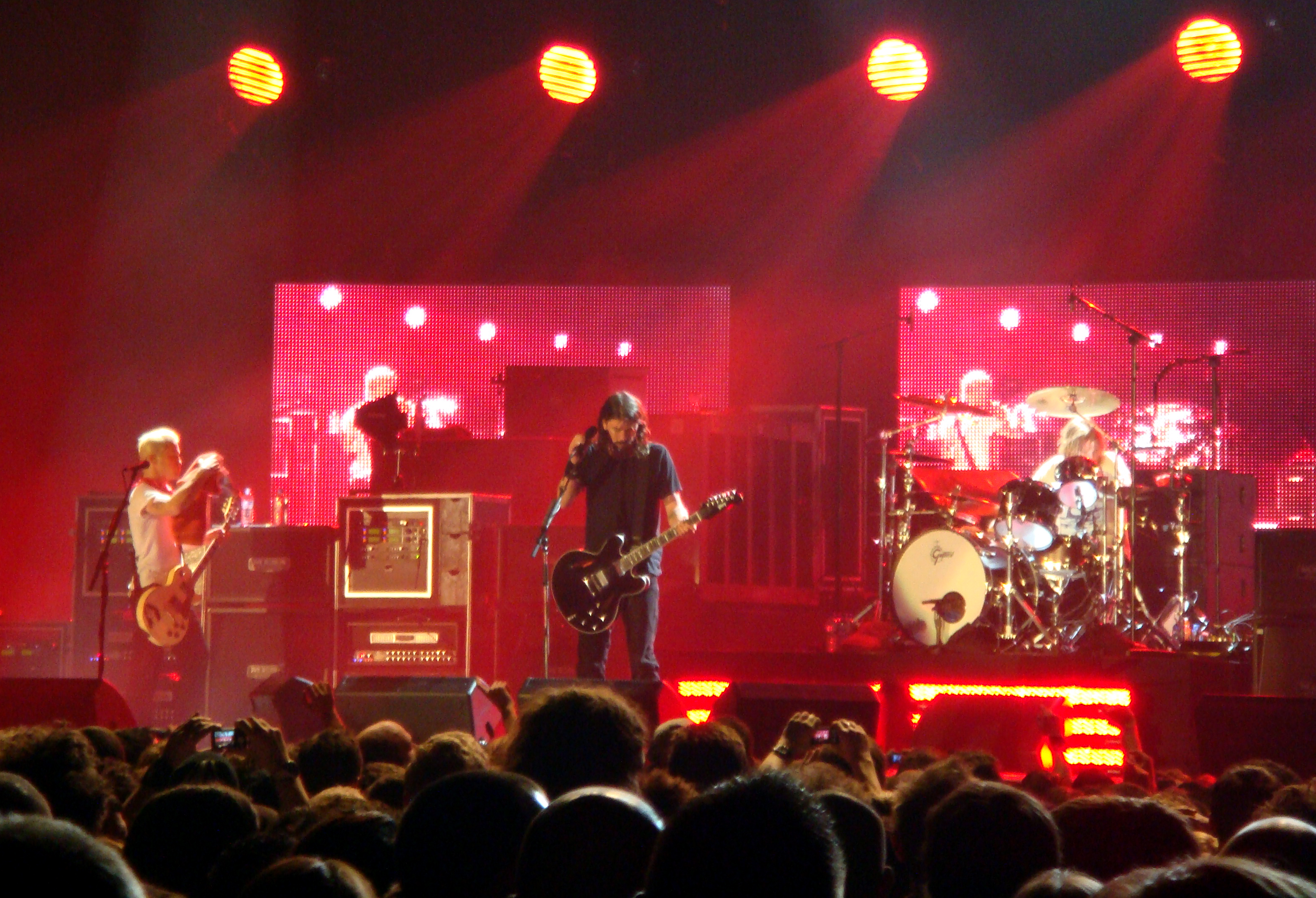
Foo Fighters performing live in 2007

Successful alternative rock artists in this decade were Imagine Dragons, Linkin Park, Muse, Coldplay, Foo Fighters, Weezer, Kasabian, Thirty Seconds To Mars, Kongos, Cage the Elephant, Evanescence, Metric, Nickelback, Arctic Monkeys, the Black Keys, Gorillaz, Red Hot Chili Peppers, Three Days Grace, the War on Drugs, Pearl Jam, Queens of the Stone Age, Panic! at the Disco, Kaleo, Hozier, Fall Out Boy, Royal Blood, Twenty One Pilots, Jack Johnson, Death from Above 1979, Paramore, Biffy Clyro, Bring Me the Horizon and Nothing but Thieves. All of these bands had albums debut in the top 5, with Fall Out Boy scoring 3 number 1 albums in a row on the Billboard 200 album chart in 2013, 2015, and 2018.

==== Psychedelic rock ====
The decade saw the revival of psychedelic rock as a popular genre for the first time since the 1970s. Bands of the decade used synths and electronic sounds within the genre. Techniques seen in other genres such as shoegaze were also employed to create walls of sound and distortion. Popular acts in the decade were Animal Collective, Tame Impala, Unknown Mortal Orchestra, Mac DeMarco, Ariel Pink, Connan Mockasin, Homeshake, King Gizzard & the Lizard Wizard, Portugal. The Man, Thee Oh Sees, Pond, Temples, MGMT, Allah-Las, The Growlers, Ty Segall, Samsara Blues Experiment, Echosmith, Lord Huron and the Black Angels.

==== Progressive and experimental rock ====
A renaissance in progressive rock occurred in the 2010s. One of the key forms of progressive music in the early 2010s was djent. Guitarists such as Misha Mansoor, Justin Lowe, and Tosin Abasi made use of seven-string, eight-string, and nine-string guitars and mainly relied on polyrhythms, palm-muting, and syncopated guitar riffs, as well as melodic guitar solos. Some of the most popular and influential djent bands were Periphery, After the Burial, Animals as Leaders, Tesseract and Born of Osiris.

Another form of progressive rock in this decade was post-progressive, which drew influences from bands such as Radiohead and Porcupine Tree. This genre relies more on simple melodic patterns combined with complex structure, texture and harmonies to create deep, emotionally driven, musical journeys. Some newer progressive rock bands that were considered a part of this renaissance were Haken, Leprous, Riverside, Public Service Broadcasting, and iamthemorning. In addition, the 2010s also saw the return of some older artists including Opeth, Devin Townsend, Anathema, Pain of Salvation and Steven Wilson, who had a mainstream breakthrough with his studio albums Hand. Cannot. Erase. and To the Bone. In 2019, Tool experienced a major comeback with their first studio album in 13 years, Fear Inoculum.

In the later part of the decade, this revival led to progressive rock crossing over with an indie-and-metal approach which became popular. Many of these bands were diverse in sound, influenced by genres like post-hardcore, math rock, and post-rock. Artists that were part of this genre and made successful albums include Nothing More, Being as an Ocean, Circa Survive, Highly Suspect, Dredg, the Color Morale, Twelve Foot Ninja, The Mars Volta, Hands Like Houses, Code Orange, Sleepwave, Dayshell, Sworn in, Dead Letter Circus, Thank You Scientist, Turbowolf, Letlive, Marmozets, Black Map, Biffy Clyro, Night Verses, Thrice, the Word Alive, Dance Gavin Dance, Shining, Mutoid Man, Arcane Roots and A Perfect Circle.

==== Pop punk and punk rock ====
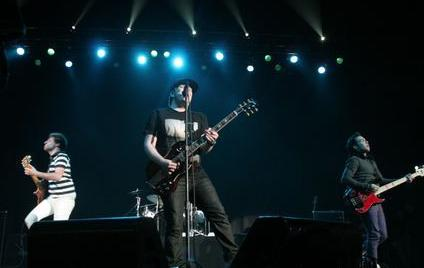
Fall Out Boy

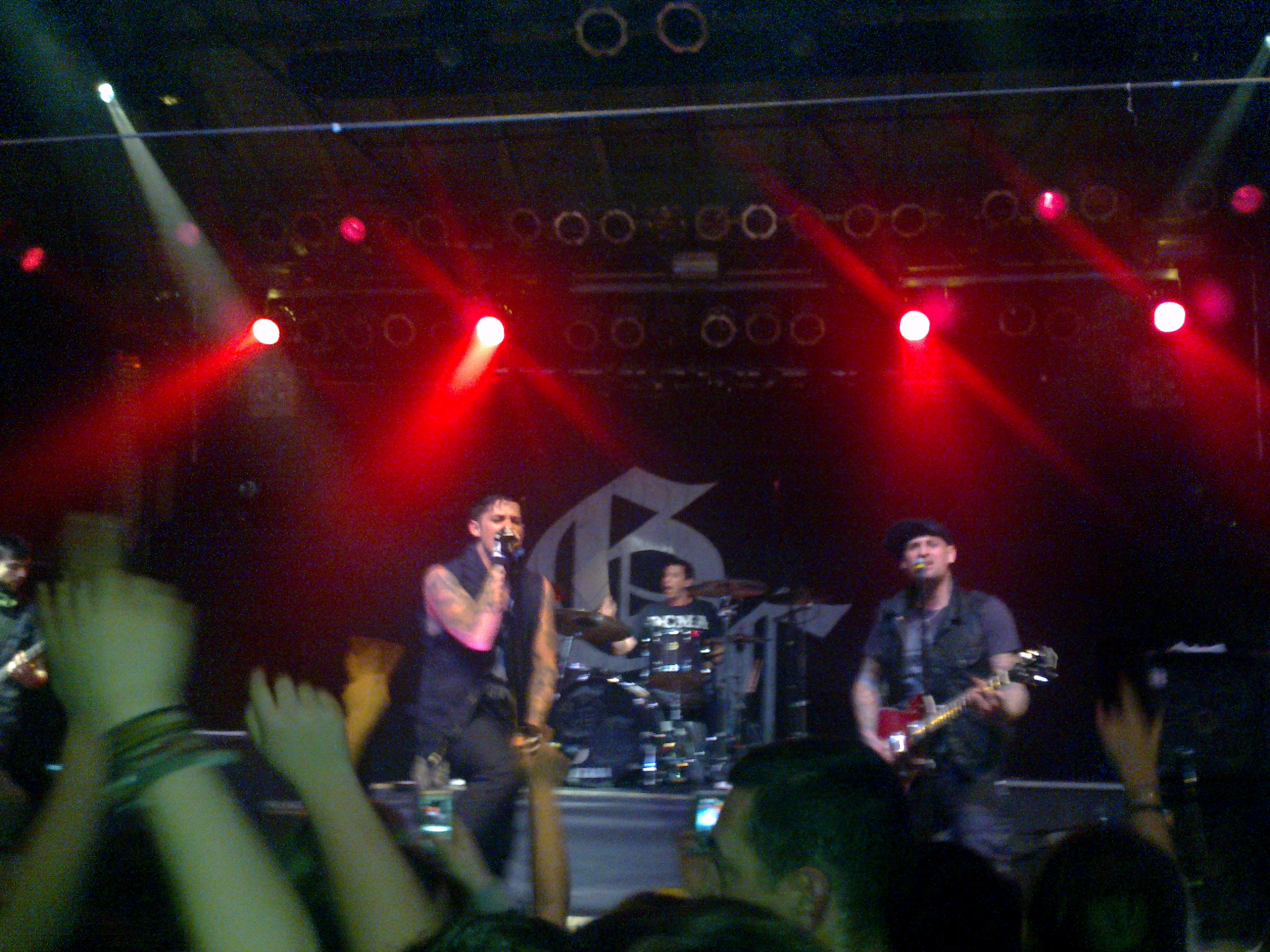
Good Charlotte performing in 2011

With a few exceptions (including Green Day, the Offspring, Fall Out Boy, and Blink-182), pop-punk decreased in mainstream popularity during the 2010s and did not enjoy the success that it had in the late 1990s and early 2000s. Emo, which had gained success between 2004 and 2008, declined in popularity by the early 2010s, with My Chemical Romance breaking up in 2013. Early 1990s punk rock bands, like Bad Religion, NOFX, and Pennywise, did not have mainstream success but still enjoyed heavy touring. Second wave pop punk acts, including Good Charlotte, Sum 41, Simple Plan, and New Found Glory, declined in popularity. However, DIY punk rock had seen somewhat of a cult resurgence with bands such as Martha, the Spook School, Neck Deep, the Story So Far, and Joanna Gruesome growing in popularity and being played on radio stations like BBC Radio 6 Music. Garage punk bands such as Wavves, FIDLAR, PUP, Best Coast, the Growlers, Bass Drum of Death, the Garden, Ty Segall, Cherry Glazerr, and Thee Oh Sees gained popularity, especially in Southern California. Many of these garage punk bands had signed to Burger Records, who are known for their DIY ethos and releasing albums on cassette tape.

==== Hard rock and heavy metal ====
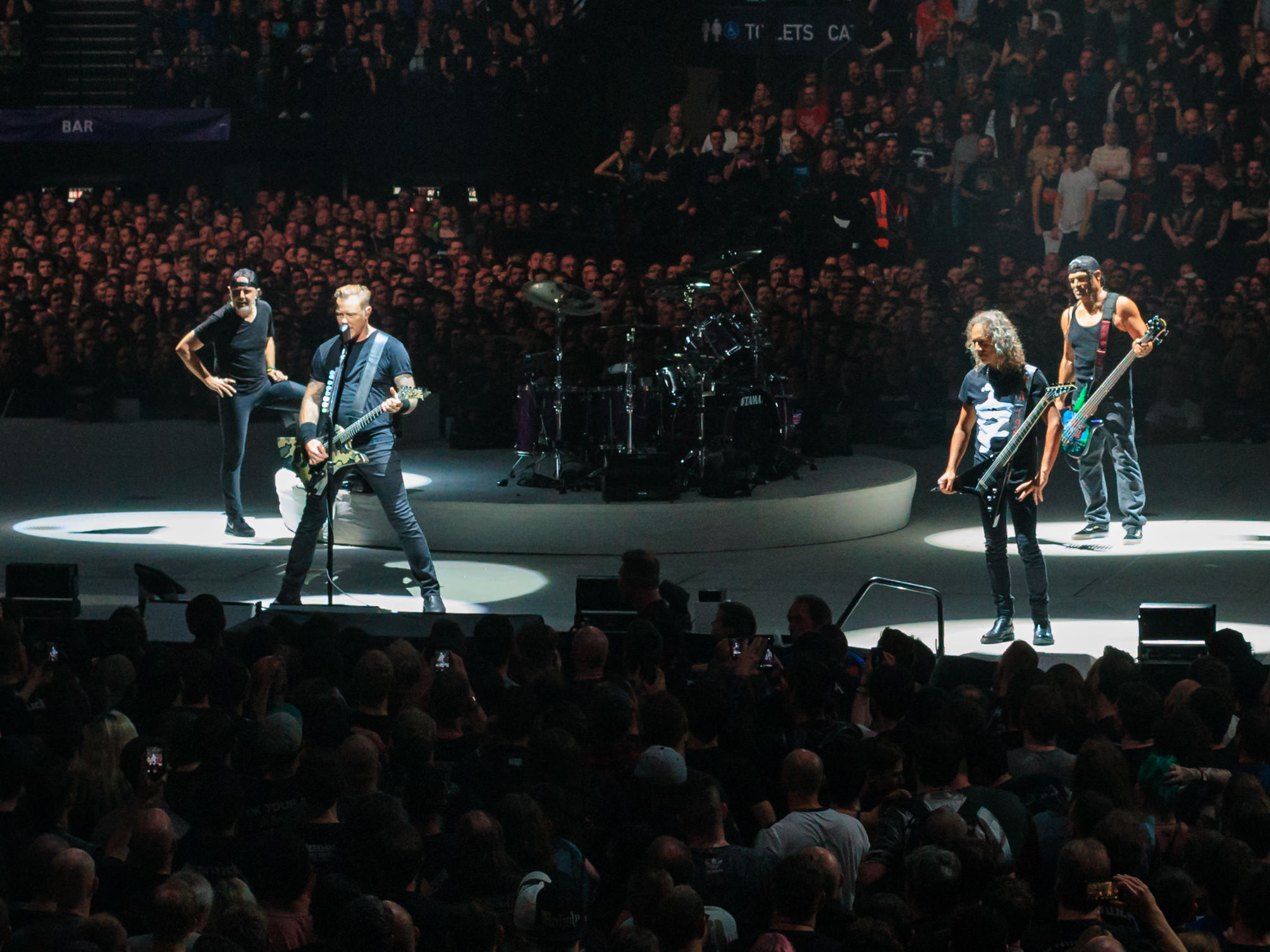
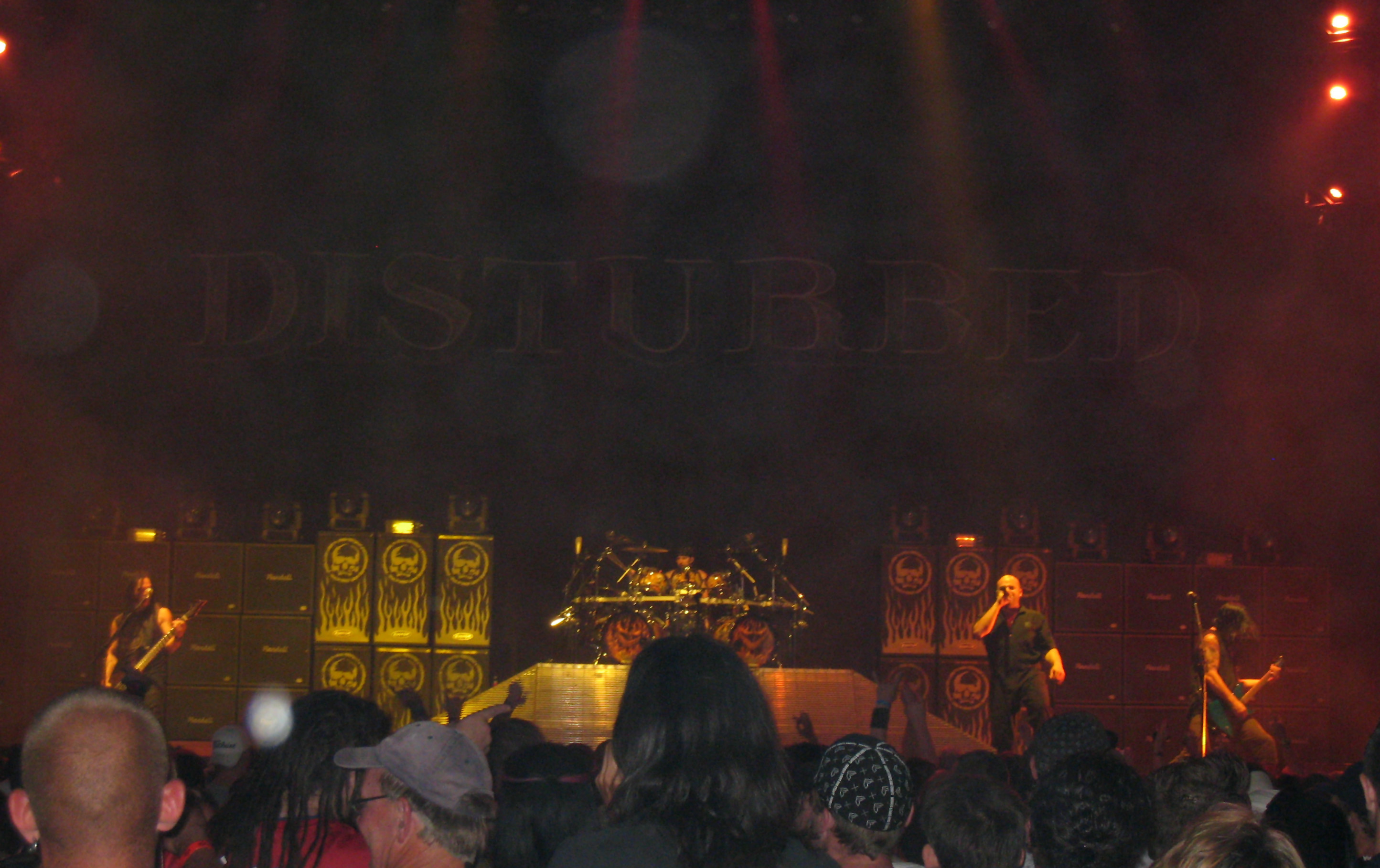
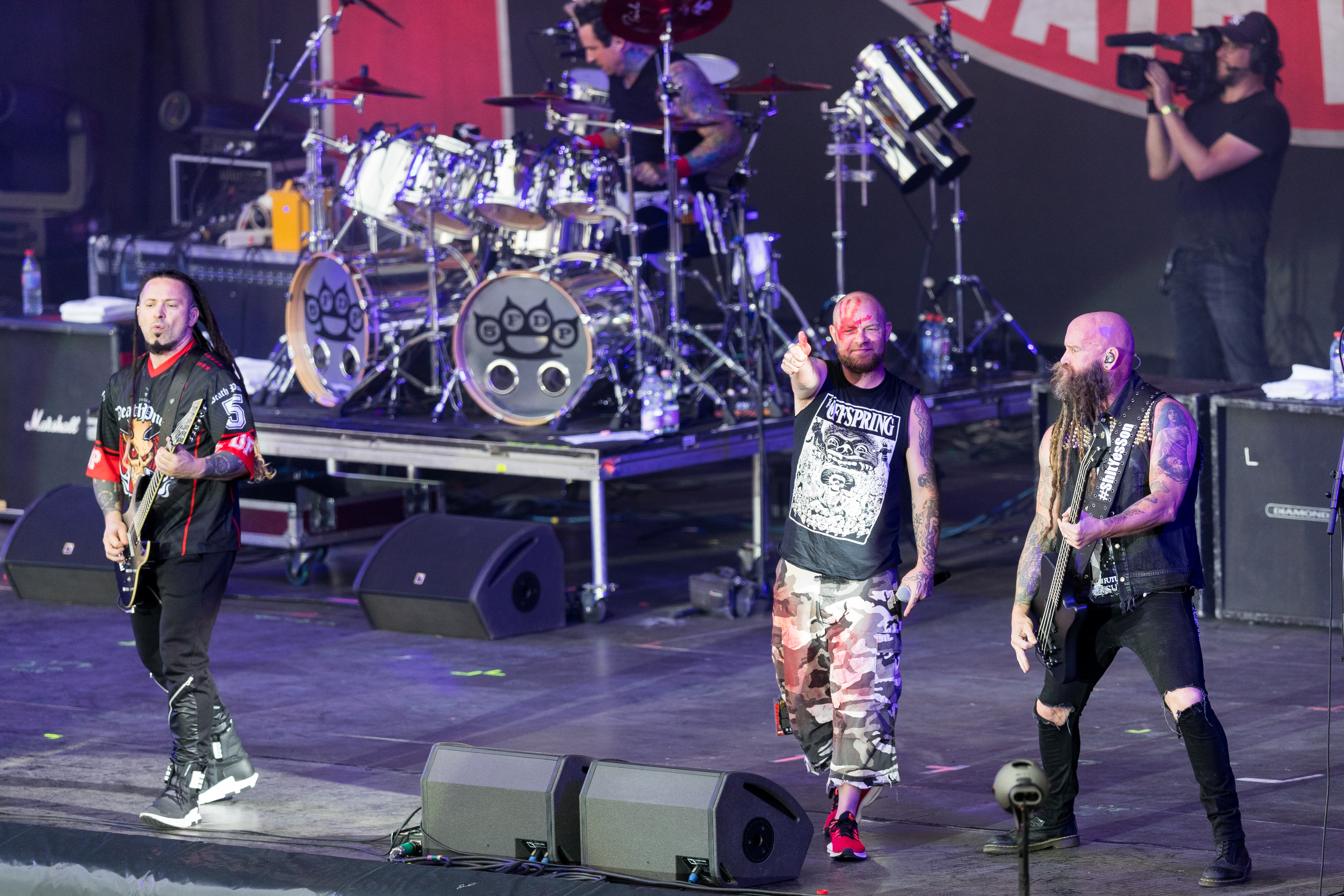
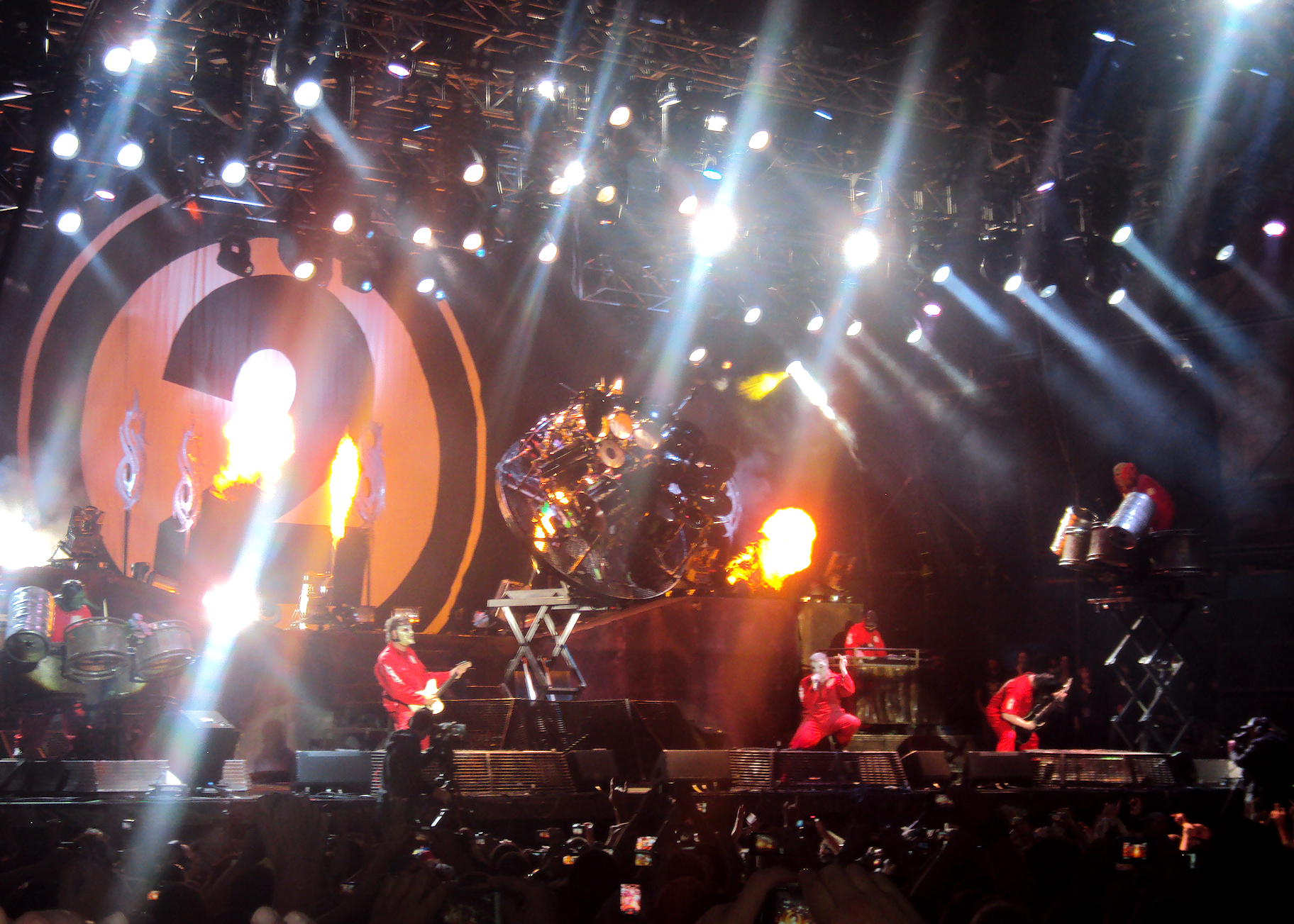
Some of the most successful North American hard rock and heavy metal bands of the decade were Metallica, Disturbed, Five Finger Death Punch and Slipknot.

During the 2010s, popular hard rock and heavy metal bands, such as Five Finger Death Punch, Avenged Sevenfold, Disturbed, Asking Alexandria, Breaking Benjamin, Slipknot, Shinedown, A Day to Remember, Royal Blood, Ghost, Halestorm, Volbeat, Papa Roach, Chevelle, Black Veil Brides, Nothing More, Parkway Drive, and Seether, released successful albums. With many newer hard rock and heavy metal acts from this decade getting more success (especially with the streaming service success of progressive and experimental rock and metal music), the decade also saw the return of older hard rock and heavy metal acts; some of which include bands that were previously on hiatus, or had not achieved mainstream popularity in years, like Deftones, Megadeth, Rush, Iron Maiden, and Dream Theater. Guns N' Roses also experienced a major comeback during the mid-to-late 2010s with the Not in This Lifetime... Tour, which saw a reunion of three-fifths of their classic lineup (Axl Rose, Slash and Duff McKagan) and went on to become one of the highest-grossing tours of the decade.

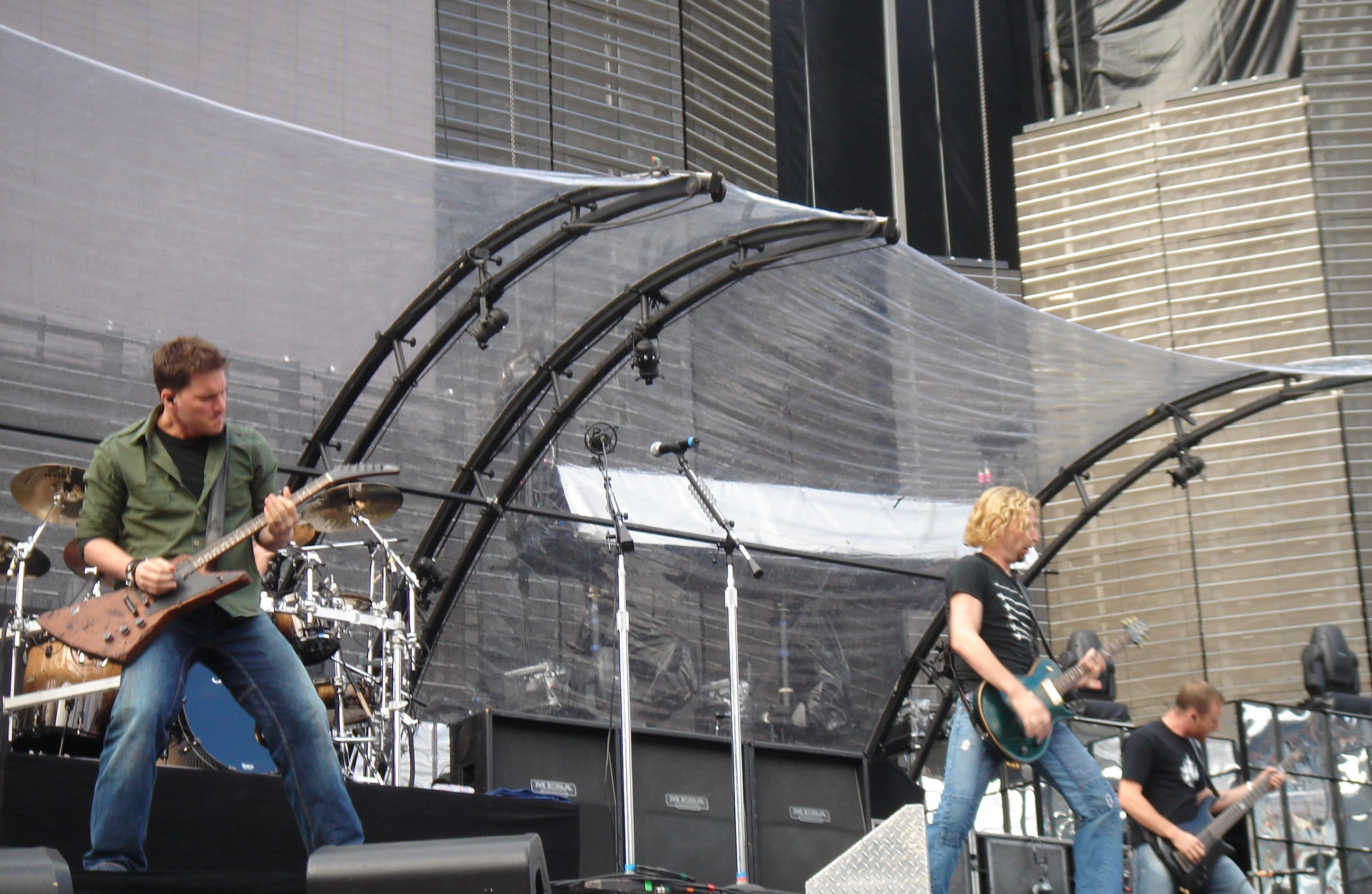
Nickelback in May 2006

Thrash metal was not as popular in the 2010s as it was during the 1980s and early-to-mid-1990s, when the genre declined in popularity with the rising success of grunge and alternative music. However, the decade saw several veteran thrash metal bands continue to maintain considerable popularity in the United States, particularly on the Billboard 200 chart. Each of "the big four" of the genre (Metallica, Megadeth, Slayer and Anthrax) released albums that debuted on the top ten on the Billboard 200, while other veteran thrash acts – including Testament, Overkill, Exodus, Metal Church and Death Angel – achieved greater success on the same chart. Newer bands associated with the "thrash metal revival movement" also gained popularity throughout the 2010s, including Bonded by Blood, Evile, Gama Bomb, Havok, Municipal Waste, Power Trip, Suicidal Angels, Vektor and Warbringer.

The decade also saw the revival of alternative metal, with two veteran Seattle acts, Soundgarden and Alice in Chains, cracking the top five on the Billboard 200 with their respective albums King Animal (2012) and The Devil Put Dinosaurs Here (2013). In addition, some of the most successful alternative metal bands that were broken up in the 1990s or 2000s, such as Primus, Jane's Addiction, Faith No More, Helmet and Biohazard, released comeback albums in the 2010s. Other popular new "classic rock" themed hard rock bands gained popularity later in the mid to late 2010s, including Greta Van Fleet, the Struts, and the Record Company.

=== Pop rock ===
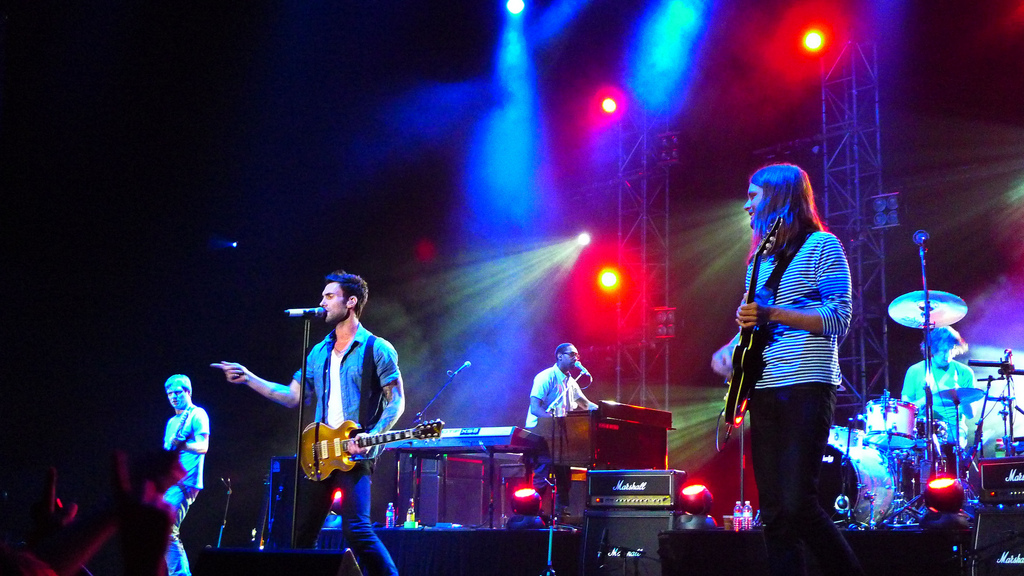
Maroon 5 performing in Hong Kong in May 2011

Although pop rock was not as popular as it was during the 1990s and early-to-mid-2000s, major pop rock acts in this decade included Train, OneRepublic, Maroon 5, DNCE, Pink, Adam Lambert, Kelly Clarkson, Lady Gaga with the soundtrack of A Star Is Born, and Avril Lavigne, while acts like the Fray and Daughtry had lesser hits. Breakthrough acts included American Authors and Walk the Moon. Pop-punk-rooted acts Panic! at the Disco and Paramore had pop rock hits. Pop artists who rose in the 2010s who drew significantly on pop rock or rock included Alessia Cara, Billie Eilish, and Halsey. Taylor Swift collaborated with alternative rock artists in the late 2010s and would enter the alternative rock charts in 2020.

=== Contemporary R&B and soul ===
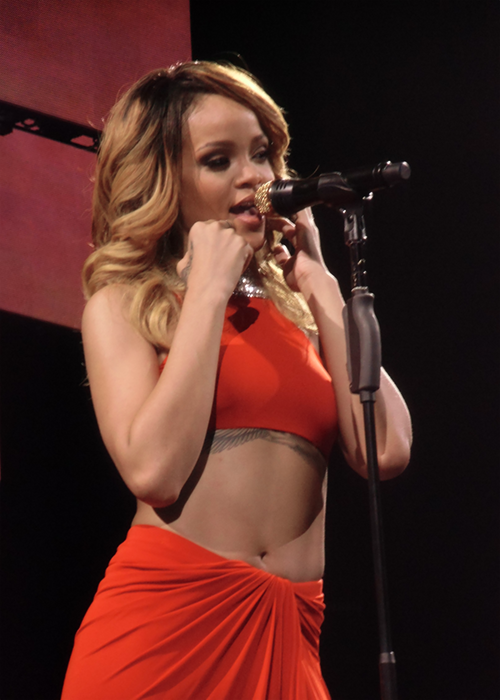
Rihanna had the most number-one singles during the 2010s.

Contemporary R&B was not as prominent in the early 2010s as it was from the late 1980s to the mid-2000s when new jack swing was a fixture in popular music. Slow jams were largely replaced by dance numbers and pop ballads. Contemporary R&B began to influence hipster musicians, creating a new genre called alternative R&B. New players emerged from this subgenre, like the Weeknd, Solange, Blood Orange, SZA, the Internet, Steve Lacy, Kali Uchis, Syd, How to Dress Well, Kilo Kish, Lion Babe, Jhene Aiko, Normani, Ravyn Lenae, Kehlani, Tinashe, Sabrina Claudio, Jason Derulo, H.E.R., Tory Lanez, Gallant, Daniel Caesar, King, Moses Sumney, Kelela, dvsn, PartyNextDoor, Jeremih, Khalid, Bryson Tiller, Summer Walker, Anderson .Paak and Giveon.

A few top mainstream contemporary R&B artists of the 2010s were Beyoncé, Trey Songz, Miguel, Alicia Keys, Justin Timberlake and Robin Thicke. There was also a slight revival of soul during the early 2010s, with artists such as CeeLo Green and Janelle Monáe.

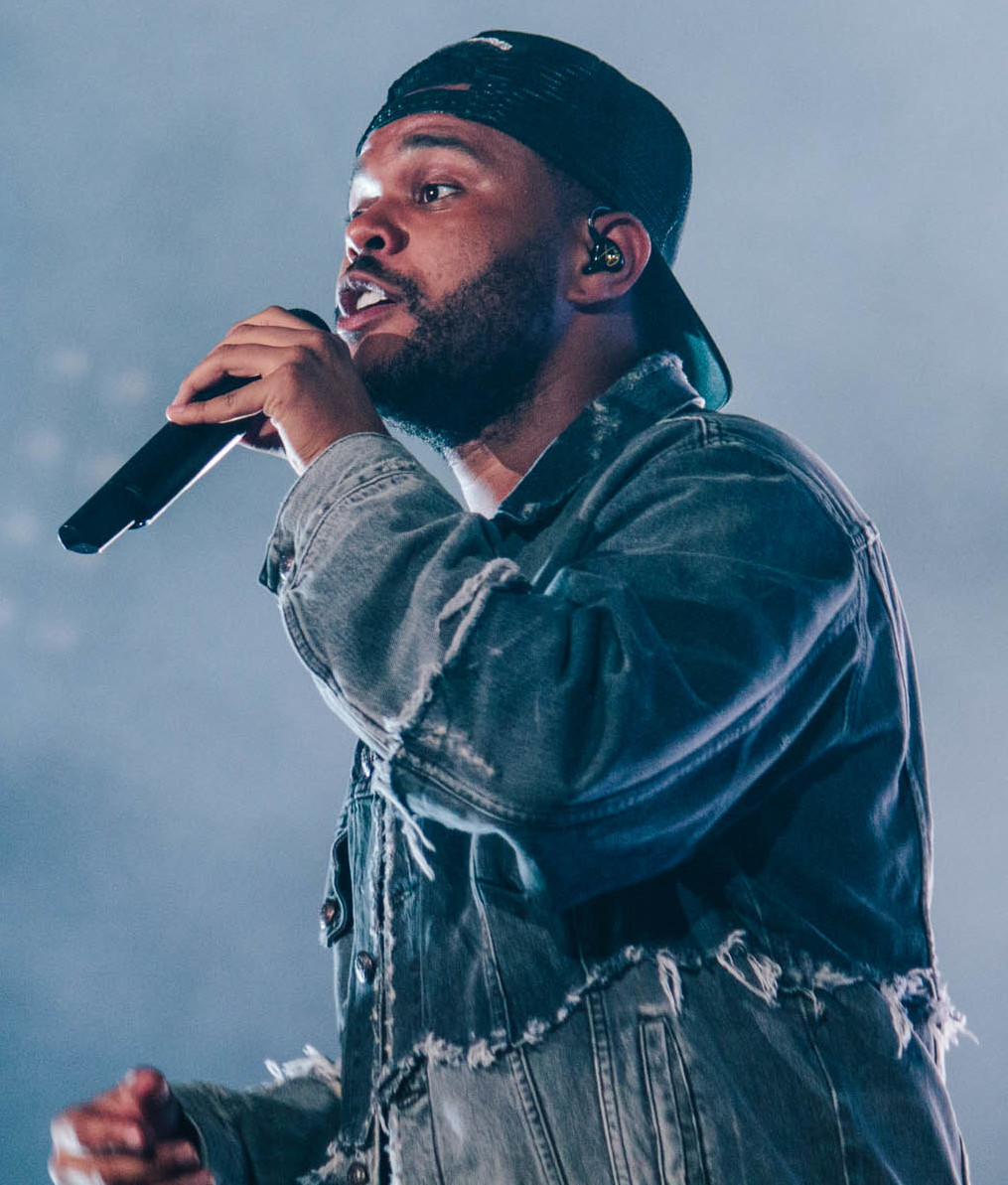
Canadian singer the Weeknd, 2018

Due to the domination of electro and dance-pop, contemporary R&B became more influenced by dance and electropop, and many musicians that were typically contemporary R&B artists started to release pop. This is notable in players, including Ne-Yo, Usher, Chris Brown, and Rihanna, with songs like "Let Me Love You (Until You Learn to Love Yourself)" and "Forever Now", "Scream" and "OMG", "Don't Wake Me Up" and "Turn Up The Music", and "We Found Love" and "Where Have You Been". Dancehall, a form of R&B, also became popular on the charts in the mid to late 2010s with songs such as "Lean On" by Major Lazer, "One Dance" by Drake, and "Work" by Rihanna.

There was also a resurgence of contemporary R&B acts from the 1990s and 2000s who achieved commercial success during the 2010s, such as Maxwell, and D'Angelo.

While some contemporary R&B artists transitioned to a more dance and electropop sound, many artists still achieved success while still remaining true to contemporary R&B. Songs, including "Everything to Me" by Monica, "Refill" by Elle Varner, "Thinking Bout You" by Frank Ocean, "Motivation" by Kelly Rowland, "Put It Down" by Brandy, and "No Sleeep" by Janet Jackson, are notable for being contemporary R&B and popular hits while still obtaining an authentic contemporary R&B sound.

Beyoncé became the first artist in Billboard chart history to have her first six albums debut at number-one on the Billboard 200 chart in 2016. Additionally, Beyoncé also became the first artist to place 12 tracks from one album within the Hot 100 simultaneously. Continuing her success from the 1990s and 2000s, Beyoncé received the Billboard Millennium Award at the 2011 Billboard Music Awards, the Michael Jackson Video Vanguard Award at the 2014 MTV Video Music Awards, the Fashion Icon Award from the Council of Fashion Designers of America in 2016, and a Peabody Award for her universally acclaimed sixth studio album Lemonade in 2017. In 2016, Beyoncé surpassed Madonna as the most-awarded artist at the MTV Video Music Awards (24 wins). In 2018, her Coachella performance made history as the most watched live-streamed performance of all time, and was also called "historic" and dubbed the single best performance of all time by many newspapers.

The late 2010s saw a resurgence of mainstream popularity in R&B, with albums such as 24K Magic by Bruno Mars and Heartbreak on a Full Moon by Chris Brown, as well as songs such as "Redbone" by Childish Gambino and "Boo'd Up" by Ella Mai.

=== Hip-hop ===
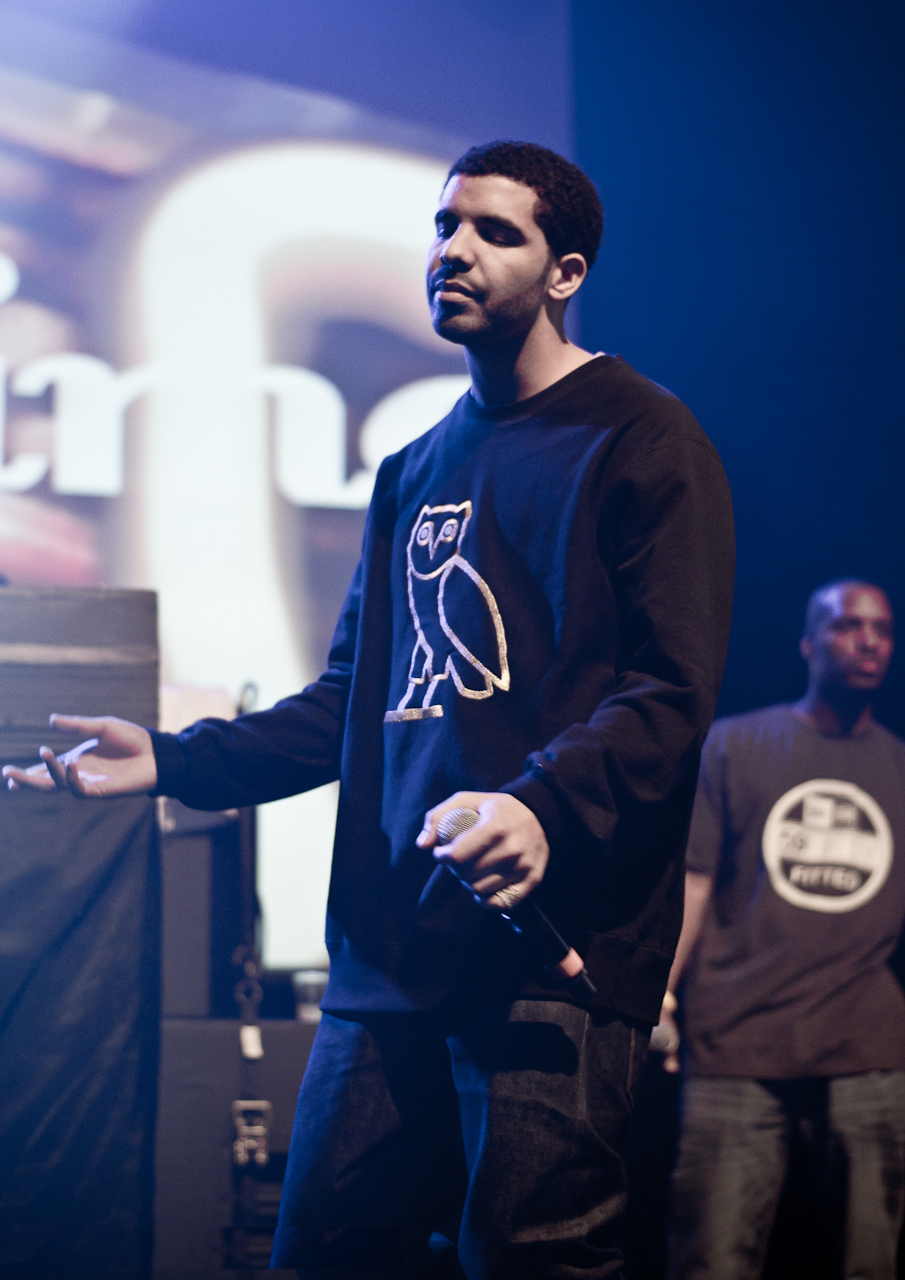
Drake was declared the Artist of the Decade of the 2010s by Billboard.

On 17 July 2017, Forbes reported that hip-hop/R&B (which Nielsen SoundScan classifies as the same genre) had recently usurped rock as the most consumed music genre for the first time in U.S. history.

The Billboard Hot 100 reflected hip-hop and rap's surge with many prominent chart-topping artists including Drake, Post Malone, Travis Scott, Eminem, Wiz Khalifa, Childish Gambino, and Lizzo. The decade also featured some of the most critically acclaimed rap and hip-hop albums of all time, notably Kendrick Lamar's To Pimp a Butterfly, which became a cultural touchstone addressing issues of racial identity and empowerment. Lamar's prominence in the decade continued as he won the 2018 Pulitzer prize for Music for his following album Damn. The album was acclaimed for his storytelling on personal struggles, African American identity, and rap culture. Other milestones include women's rising success in rap and hip-hop in the mainstream. Additionally, there were progressions in experimental hip-hop and other non-mainstream genres.

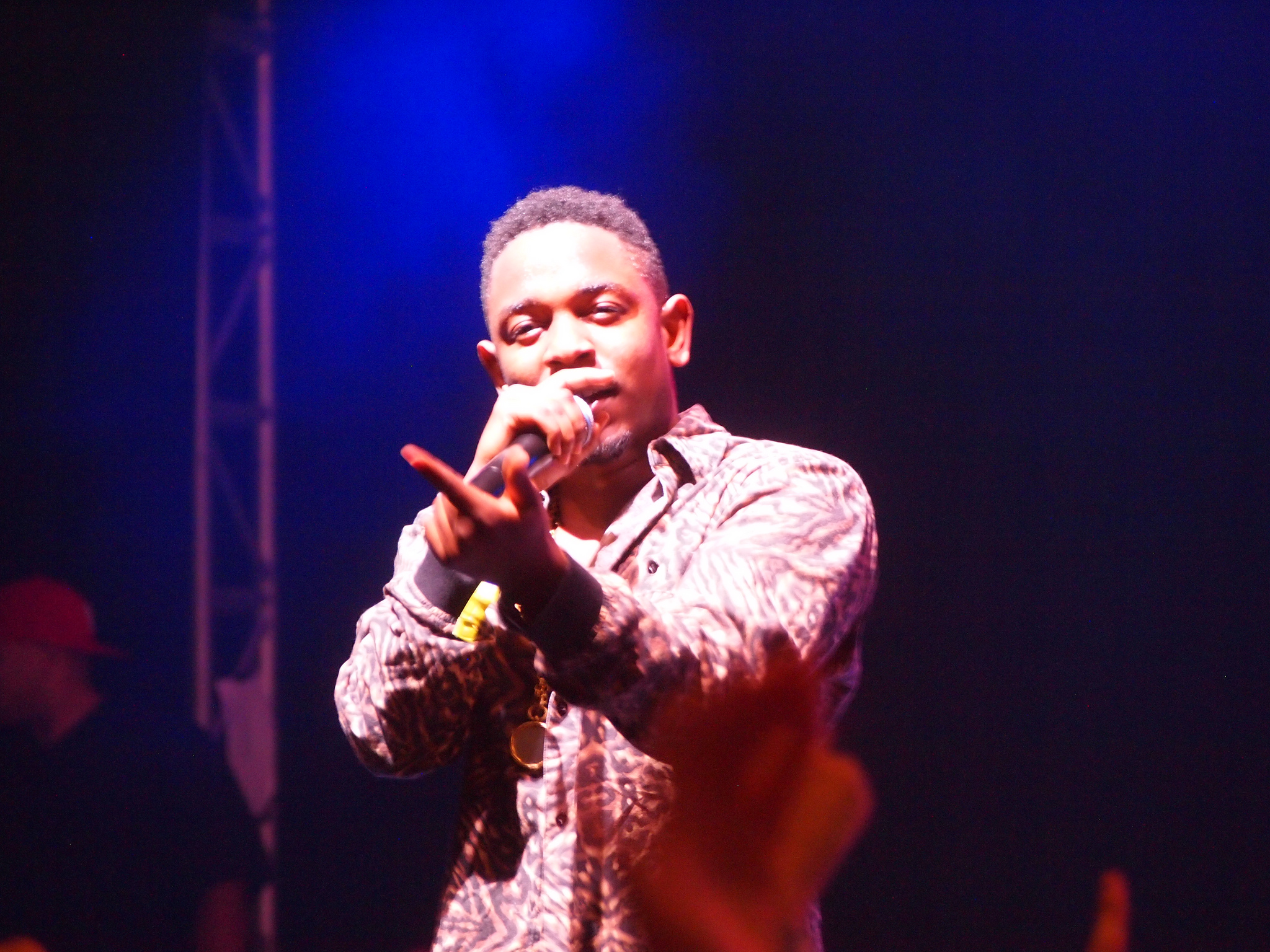
American rapper Kendrick Lamar

In the 2010s social media platforms like Instagram, Twitter, TikTok, Vine, and SoundCloud helped artists build personal brands and virally promote their music. TikTok in particular became a launchpad for artists like Lil Nas X and his song "Old Town Road", becoming a viral hit from the success of TikTok. Memes and internet trends would boost the virality of songs. Some of the most notable examples are the use of Rae Sremmurd's song "Black Beatles" as the background track for the mannequin challenge. The lyrics "rain drop, drop top" from Migos's "Bad and Boujee" inspired many memes parodying the lyrics. SoundCloud influenced the popularity and success of rappers Lil Uzi Vert, XXXTentacion, Playboi Carti, Juice WRLD, Trippie Redd, and more. Gaining massive followings, they created a new pipeline for underground artists to achieve success while still remaining underground. The advances in technology and music production made it easier for independent artists to create quality music at a low cost and promote it to a wider audience. Hip-hop acts that had gained fame via the social medium Vine were T-Wayne, iLoveMakonnen, Silento, Bobby Shmurda, Desiigner and iLoveMemphis.

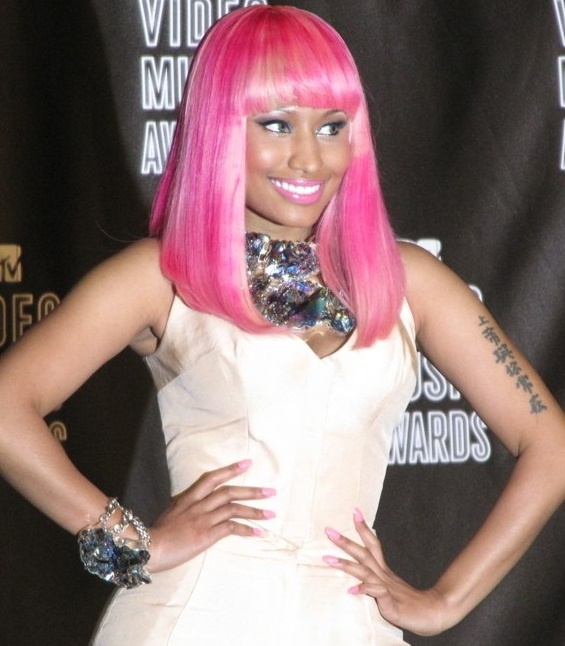
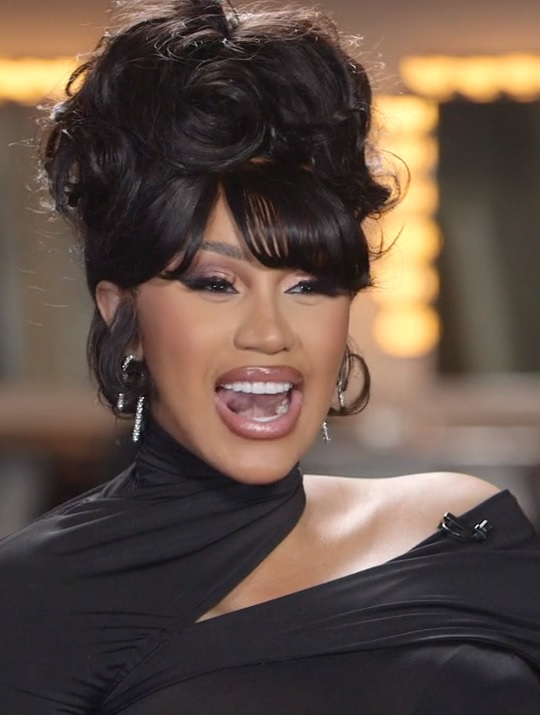
Nicki Minaj has been credited with reviving the genre of female rap in the early 2010s with her commercially successful debut album Pink Friday and hits like "Super Bass"; Cardi B followed in the late 2010s, achieving widespread commercial success with her debut album Invasion of Privacy and numerous chart-topping singles like "Bodak Yellow" and "I Like It".

The 2010s saw many women in hip-hop and rap break through and rise in popularity. Nicki Minaj set the stage in 2010 with a guest feature on Kanye West's album My Beautiful Dark Twisted Fantasy before she released her debut album. Her energy-packed verse on the song "Monster" was alongside other guest rappers JAY-Z and Rick Ross. This feature introduced her to many in the rap world and her debut album, Pink Friday, followed a few months later. Pink Friday reached the top of the Billboard 200 chart and became the first remale rap album to top the chart since Lauryn Hill's The Miseducation of Lauryn Hill in 1998. Minaj's song "Super Bass"—along with its accompanying music video—went viral, and became the most successful female rap single since Missy Elliott's "Work It" in 2002, almost a decade earlier.

More female rappers rose as the 2010s progressed, notably Cardi B, who emerged around 2016 and later won Best Rap Album at the 2019 Grammy Awards, becoming the second woman to achieve this after Lauryn Hill in 1999. Cardi B's singles such as "Bodak Yellow", "I Like It", and "Girls Like You" all hit number one on the Billboard Hot 100 chart. Cardi B's debut album Invasion of Privacy became the highest-certified female rap album of the 21st century. Both Doja Cat and Megan Thee Stallion—both of whom collaborated with Nicki Minaj and Cardi B—entered the Billboard Hot 100 for the first time in 2019 and they continued to climb the charts further in the 2020s.

Experimental hip-hop artists such as Death Grips, JPEGMafia, and Clipping. have incorporated elements of experimental rock and industrial music into their sound, gaining notoriety in underground music circles and online. Kanye West's album Yeezus has been compared to this sound.

A number of hip-hop labels also grew influential during this decade, such as Grand Hustle Records, GOOD Music, Cash Money Records, Roc Nation, Maybach Music Group, Top Dawg Entertainment, and Def Jam Recordings.

Hip-hop acts that were introduced to mainstream in the beginning of the decade included J. Cole, Kid Cudi, Big Sean, Meek Mill, ASAP Rocky, Tyler, The Creator, Azealia Banks, Future, Schoolboy Q, Wale, YG, 2 Chainz, Waka Flocka Flame, French Montana, Macklemore, Machine Gun Kelly, Chief Keef, and A$AP Ferg. Hip-hop acts that were introduced to mainstream during mid-late part of the decade included Fetty Wap, Ty Dolla Sign, NF, G-Eazy, Logic, Lil Pump, Youngboy Never Broke Again, Yo Gotti, Lil Yachty, Mac Miller, Brockhampton, B.o.B, Ugly God, Rich the Kid, Gunna, 6ix9ine, Blueface, BlocBoy JB, Lil Xan, NLE Choppa, DaBaby, YBN Cordae, YBN Nahmir, Anderson .Paak and more. Hip-hop acts that started in previous decades, but continued to have commercial success in this decade include Jay Z, Sean Paul, Lil Wayne, DJ Khaled, Gucci Mane, Rick Ross, Jeezy and Pusha T. Hip-hop acts that had never charted on the Billboard Hot 100 but still retained a strong fan base within the hip-hop community at large were Earl Sweatshirt, Princess Nokia, Joey Bada$$, Denzel Curry, Maxo Kream, Vince Staples, Divine Council, Isaiah Rashad, Action Bronson, and SpaceGhostPurrp.

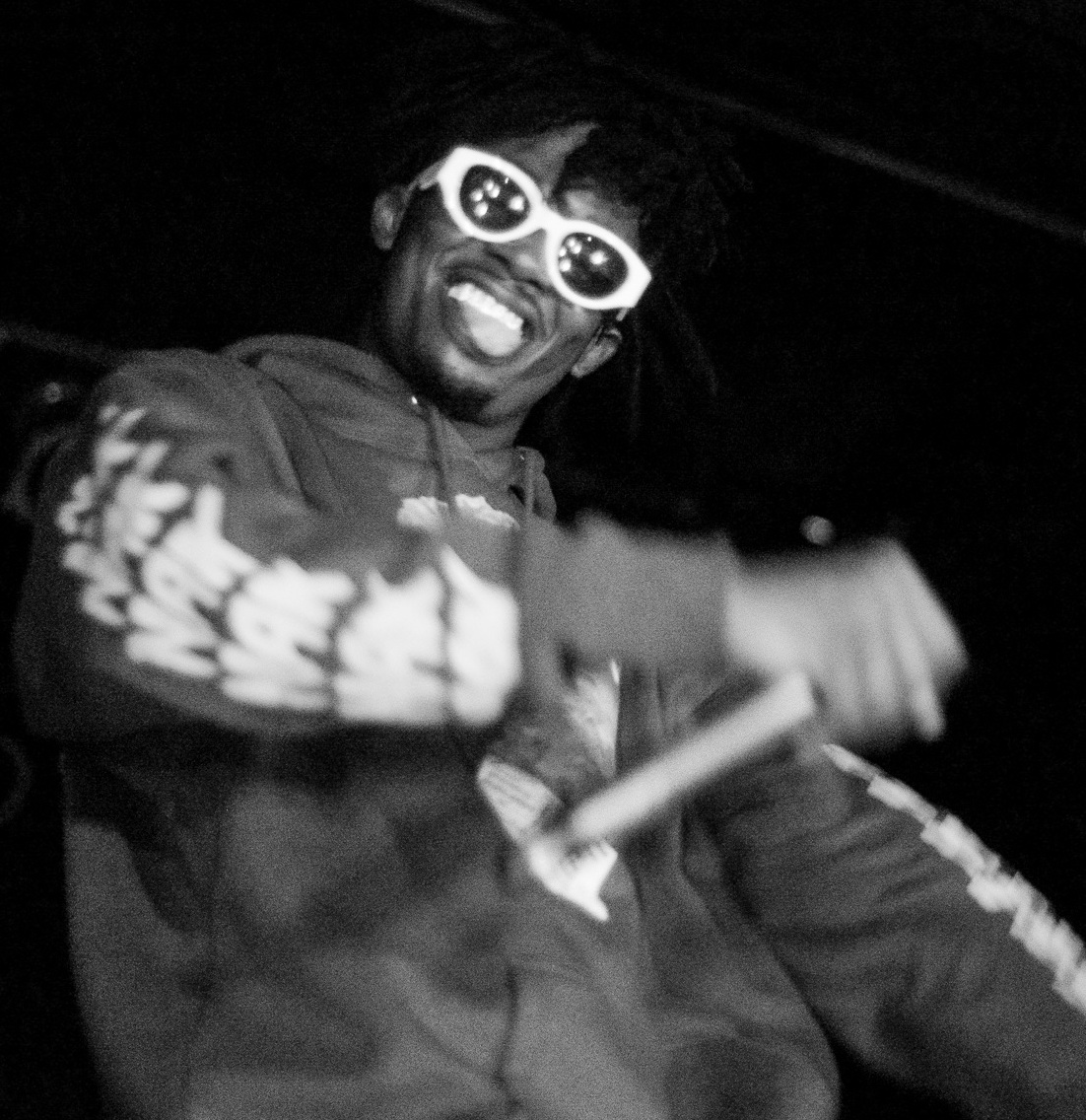
American rapper Playboi Carti

==== Blog rap ====
The early 2010s blog era of hip-hop was defined by the rise of internet platforms like Tumblr, DatPiff, and niche hip-hop blogs such as 2DopeBoyz, Nah Right, and IllRoots, which became primary outlets for discovering music. This era saw a shift as artists began thriving outside traditional industry systems, using blogs and social media to connect directly with fans. Key figures like Wale, Big Sean, Joey Badass, Kendrick Lamar, Kid Cudi, J. Cole, M.I.A, ScHoolboy Q, Wiz Khalifa, Earl Sweatshirt, and Tyler, the Creator flooded the scene with mixtapes and releases that garnered massive attention. These artists embraced a DIY approach, blending soul samples, lo-fi beats, experimental sounds, and personal, reflective lyrics.

Mixtapes like K.I.D.S. by Mac Miller, Kush & Orange Juice by Wiz Khalifa, and Acid Rap by Chance the Rapper helped shape the movement. The aesthetic of blog rap reflected skate culture, individuality, and a rebellious fashion style, influencing how artists marketed themselves online. This period marked a significant shift in how music was shared and consumed, with many of these blog-era artists transitioning into mainstream success by the mid-2010s. Blog rap also laid the foundation for the late 2010s SoundCloud rap era, which sometimes came to be referred to disparagingly as "mumble rap".

==== Mumble rap ====
Mumble rap is a rap subgenre that originated on the online audio distribution platform SoundCloud. Most successful "SoundCloud rappers" might not release all their music on the platform, opting instead for streaming services Apple Music and Spotify but are still categorized as "SoundCloud rappers" or "Internet"/"Underground rappers" due to their aesthetics, sonics and collaborations with other rappers and producers in the scene. As the name suggests, the vocals often are perceived as unintelligible and drowned out in addition to fragmented lyrical patterns. It is characterized as simplistic, bass-heavy beats, often with hazy, lo-fi or shimmering-sounding melodies or samples, paired with lyrics that ping-pong between braggadocio and nihilism, with lots of sex and odes to heavy narcotics. The subgenre began to start seeing mainstream popularity in the mid 2010s and takes sonic and aesthetic inspiration from the trap, drill, cloud rap, and internet rap scenes that began in the late 2000s and early 2010s on websites such as DatPiff and rap blogs with artists such as Lil B, Young Thug, Max B, Lil Ugly Mane, A$AP Mob, SpaceGhostPurrp and Chief Keef. The subgenre was met with some criticism for having less emphasis on lyricism, and the problematic nature of the artists to arise from it.

Influential SoundCloud rappers include Kodak Black, Yung Bans, Lil Pump, Nav, Lil Uzi Vert, Travis Scott, Uno The Activist, Lil Yachty, Smokepurpp, ThouxanBanFauni, XXXTentacion, 21 Savage, 6ix9ine, Trippie Redd, Denzel Curry, Lucki, Warhol.SS, Maxo Kream, Young Nudy, Ugly God, Playboi Carti, Bones and $uicideboy$.

==== Trap ====
Trap music is a style of Southern hip-hop and gangsta rap that was developed in the late 1990s to early 2000s in the Southern United States. In the 2010s, artists crossbred trap with dubstep to create trap EDM. It also influenced Latin trap music.

Prominent rappers of the trap music subgenre during the 2010s include Gucci Mane, Young Thug, 21 Savage, Kodak Black, Cardi B, Nasty C and Lil Baby, among several others. Trap music during the 2010s also helped record producers rise to prominence such as Mike Will Made It, Lex Luger, Southside, Metro Boomin, London on da Track, and Murda Beatz.

===== Trap metal =====
Trap metal is a fusion genre that started in the 2010s, combining elements of trap music and heavy metal, as well as elements of other genres, like industrial and nu metal. It is characterized by distorted beats, hip-hop flows, harsh vocals, and down tuned heavy metal guitars. British rapper Scarlxrd is often associated with the genre and is considered a pioneer of trap metal. WQHT described OG Maco's 2014 eponymous EP as being a part of the genre's early development. Other artists associated with trap metal include Dropout Kings, Bone Crew, Ghostemane, ZillaKami, Fever 333, Ho99o9, City Morgue, Kid Bookie, Rico Nasty, Kim Dracula, Backxwash, Denzel Curry, and $uicideboy$, as well as the early careers of XXXTentacion, 6ix9ine and Ski Mask the Slump God.

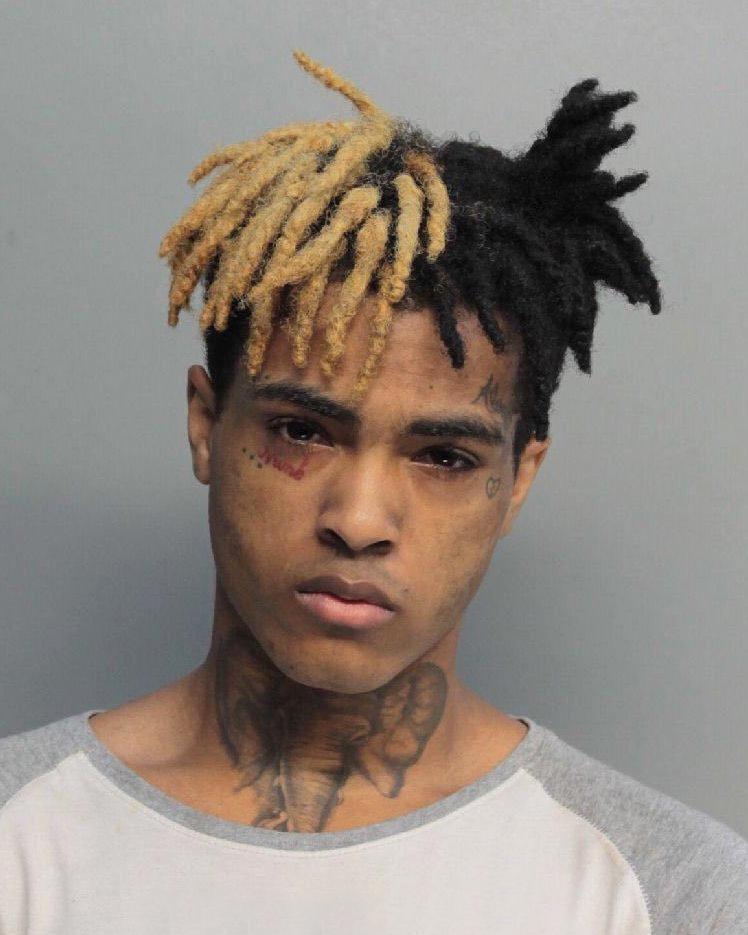
American rapper and singer XXXTentacion

==== Emo rap ====
Emo rap is a fusion genre of hip-hop and emo. Originating in the SoundCloud rap scene in the mid-2010s, the genre fuses characteristics of hip-hop music, such as beats and rapping, with the lyrical themes, instrumentals, and vocals commonly found in emo music. XXXTentacion, Juice Wrld, and Lil Peep are some of the most notable musicians in the genre. Emo rap departs from the "traditional" tones found in modern mainstream hip-hop in favor of more emotional and personal lyrical content, described by The Wall Street Journal as "giving their elders the finger." Lyrics tend to focus on topics such as depression, loneliness, anxiety, drug abuse, nihilism, suicide, heartbreak, and self-medication. The genre is characterized by its combination of musical elements commonly found in conscious hip-hop with indie rock instrumentals. Sampling often uses 2000s pop punk and emo songs. Emo rap was pioneered by Bones, whose VHS-recorded music videos and dark production and aesthetic were so influential on the hip-hop underground of the time that Dazed described him as the "underground rap king." In 2012, members of Thraxxhouse, a subgroup of Raider Klan, formed GothBoiClique (GBC), with the intention of drawing connections between the emo, trap, dark wave, black metal and indie rock scenes. GBC's style of emo rap influenced swathes of artists in the underground emo and hip-hop scenes on SoundCloud, with Lil Lotus, Lil Peep and Lil Tracy, all citing the group as an influence and the latter-most two even eventually becoming members. During this time, a DIY ethos came to define the genre, to the extent that when Shinigami released his debut album Luna on Spotify, he was derided as a sellout, due to the streaming service's ability to monetize. In November 2017, Lil Peep died of a Fentanyl overdose. Shortly afterwards, Lil Peep's debut studio album Come Over When You're Sober, Pt. 1 and the lead single "Awful Things" charted on the Billboard charts. His death brought increased notability to the genre as a whole and particularly to artists such as Trippie Redd and Lil Aaron. In June 2018, XXXTentacion was murdered, and like Peep, his albums 17 and ? charted the following week, along with his hit song "SAD!" charting at 1st on the Billboard Hot 100. In September 2018, a posthumous collaboration between the two artists, "Falling Down" was released and became certified Platinum in the US. The same year, emo rap was the fastest-growing genre on Spotify in 2018. In December 2019, Juice WRLD died after suffering a seizure, induced by an overdose of oxycodone and codeine. He was known to most people for the songs "All Girls Are the Same" and "Lucid Dreams", the latter peaked at number two on the Billboard Hot 100 in 2018 and returned to the chart in 2019 at number eight following his death.

==== Alternative rap and industrial hip-hop ====
Alternative hip-hop is a hip-hop subgenre that spans genres. Artists such as Clipping, Moor Mother, Dälek, Billy Woods, M.I.A., Odd Future, Death Grips, Freddie Gibbs, Danny Brown, BROCKHAMPTON, JPEGMAFIA, Chance the Rapper and Injury Reserve released music during the decade. Previous alternative acts such as El-P and Aesop Rock rejuvenated their careers throughout the 2010s, with the former releasing three albums with Atlanta rapper Killer Mike under rap group Run the Jewels, and the latter achieving critical acclaim with both 2012's Skelethon and 2016's The Impossible Kid. Death Grips' debut studio album, The Money Store, is their first step into the world of experimental hip-hop. The follow-up to Exmilitary, their debut mixtape, the album was published on April 24, 2012 When The Money Store was first released, it earned a lot of positive press. "MC Ride, Andy Morin, and Zach Hill set out to produce an aggressive, stunning, ferocious racket and succeeded in spades," said music journalist Jim Carroll. Yeezus is the sixth studio album by the American rapper and producer Kanye West. It was released on June 18, 2013, through Def Jam Recordings and Roc-A-Fella Records. West gathered a number of artists and close collaborators for the production, including Mike Dean, Daft Punk, Noah Goldstein, Arca, Hudson Mohawke, and Travis Scott. The album also features guest vocals from Justin Vernon, Chief Keef, Kid Cudi, Assassin, King L, Charlie Wilson, and Frank Ocean. It draws from an array of genres, including industrial, acid house, electro, punk, and Chicago drill. West's unconventional use of samples is also contained, as on "Blood on the Leaves", which contains a sample from Nina Simone's 1965 rendition of "Strange Fruit". Yeezus was nominated for Best Rap Album at the 2014 Grammy Awards. The album debuted at number one on the US Billboard 200, selling 327,000 copies in the first week of release, while also topping the charts in Australia, Canada, Denmark, New Zealand, Russia and the United Kingdom. It has since been certified double platinum by the Recording Industry Association of America (RIAA), and was named as one of the best albums of the 2010s by Rolling Stone, who later included it at 269 on its 2020 list of the 500 Greatest Albums of All Time.

==== Jazzhop and lofi hip-hop ====
Lo-fi hip-hop emerged in the underground beatmaking hip-hop scene of the 2000s but reached peak popularity throughout the 2010s, particularly after the release of the Roland SP-303 and Roland SP-404 samplers, both of which included a separate button for the "lo-fi" effect. YouTube started hosting live streams in 2013, resulting in 24-hour "radio stations" dedicated to the subgenre. Compilation videos also became popular, combining the music with visuals that could take the form of recorded pedestrian walks through major cities like Tokyo, looping visuals from cartoons such as The Simpsons or Internet memes.

=== Electronic ===
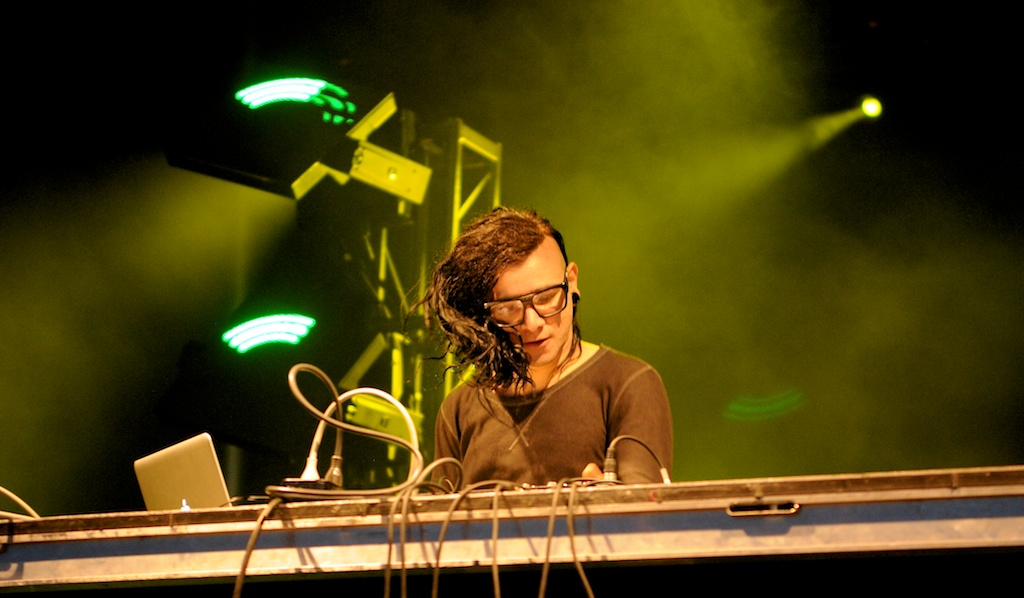
Grammy Award-winning Skrillex in 2011

While dance music had periodically conquered the American pop charts, its current incursion had most likely been its deepest since the disco heyday of the 1970s. Throughout the 2010s, various electronic dance subgenres had conquered the music scene, such as house, dubstep, drumstep, hardstyle, electro house, techno, trance, synth-pop, electropop, and trap. These genres have many musical influences from 1970s' disco, 1980s' hi-NRG, spacesynth, Italo disco, and new wave, and 1990s' and 2000s' Eurodance, techno, house, trip hop, Europop, garage rock, and trance. The rise of electronic dance had brought massive success to large festivals, raves, technoparades, algoraves, doofs, and teknivals that mostly take place in the United States and Europe though every year thousands of electronic focused music festivals are held throughout the world. These events are also well known for their long association with the use of recreational drugs, including MDMA, LSD, 2C-B, Ketamine, and Benzylpiperazine. The top mainstream disk jockeys in the 2010s were Tiësto, David Guetta, Calvin Harris, Steve Aoki, Nicky Romero, Afrojack, Deadmau5, Diplo, Skrillex, Armin Van Buuren, Avicii, Zedd, Martin Garrix, Hardwell, The Chainsmokers, Marshmello, Major Lazer, Mark Ronson, DJ Snake, Baauer, Slushii, and Disclosure.

==== Hyperpop ====
A loosely defined musical style and queer microgenre known as hyperpop was born in the UK in the early 2010s. Artists in this genre generally combine pop and avant-garde sensibilities while relying on themes found in electronic, hip-hop, and dance music. It is distinguished by a maximalist or exaggerated take on popular music. Hyperpop typically uses elements like brash synth melodies, Auto-Tuned "earworm" vocals, excessive compression, and distortion, as well as surrealist or nostalgic allusions to 2000s Internet culture and the Web 2.0 era. Hyperpop reflects an exaggerated, eclectic, and self-referential approach to pop music. Heavy processing of the voice, metallic, melodic percussion, pitch-shifted synths, catchy choruses, brief song lengths, and "shiny, cutesy aesthetics" contrasted with angst-filled lyrics are common characteristics. Mark Richardson of The Wall Street Journal described the genre as escalating the tropes of popular music that are "artificial", creating "a cartoonish wall of noise that embraces catchy rhythms and memorable hooks." As shimmering melodies and jumbled instrumentation combine, the music veers between the beautiful and the ugly.

=== Indie ===
==== Indie folk ====
Indie Folk is an amalgamation of independent American music formed by the diverse traditions that comprise the musical ethos of the United States, particularly sounds that emerged from the Southern United States such as folk, gospel, blues and other external influences. Artists such as The Lumineers, Fleet Foxes, Mumford & Sons, Bon Iver, Phoebe Bridgers and Sufjan Stevens became mainstream successes because of their organic instrumentation and rootsy production style.

==== Bedroom pop ====
Dreamy, nostalgic music produced from the homes of young, independent artists became popular in the late 2010s, particularly online. The term "bedroom pop" was popularized by Spotify to describe indie pop music with lo-fi music production, dream pop inspired guitar tones, and vintage synthesizers. Mac DeMarco helped popularize this style, especially his 2012 studio album 2 which was not only a critical success but a commercial success laying the groundwork for various other lo-fi inspired indie acts. Clairo appeared on the scene with her songs "Pretty Girl", 4EVER and Flaming Hot Cheetos. She was particularly praised for her nostalgic synth pop sound and her dream-like lo-fi aesthetic. Other artists that were popular at the time include Rex Orange County, Still Woozy, Boy Pablo, Cavetown, Girl in Red, Beabadoobee, Kenny Beats, Gus Dapperton, Dayglow, Cuco and Left at London. Bedroom pop allowed for the expression of LGBTQ+ themes in the alternative music spheres, specifically Girl In Red and Cavetown.

===== Latin indie pop =====
Artists such as Kali Uchis, The Marias, Mon Laferte, Cuco, Omar Apollo and contributed to the Indie landscape with hazy Lo-fi production styles. Dream pop guitars, sychedelic synthesizers and the use of 80's drum machines were used by Latin artists in the late 2010's. These artists helped to create the Bedroom pop genre, and became an influence on the broader indie pop landscape in the United States.

=== Country ===
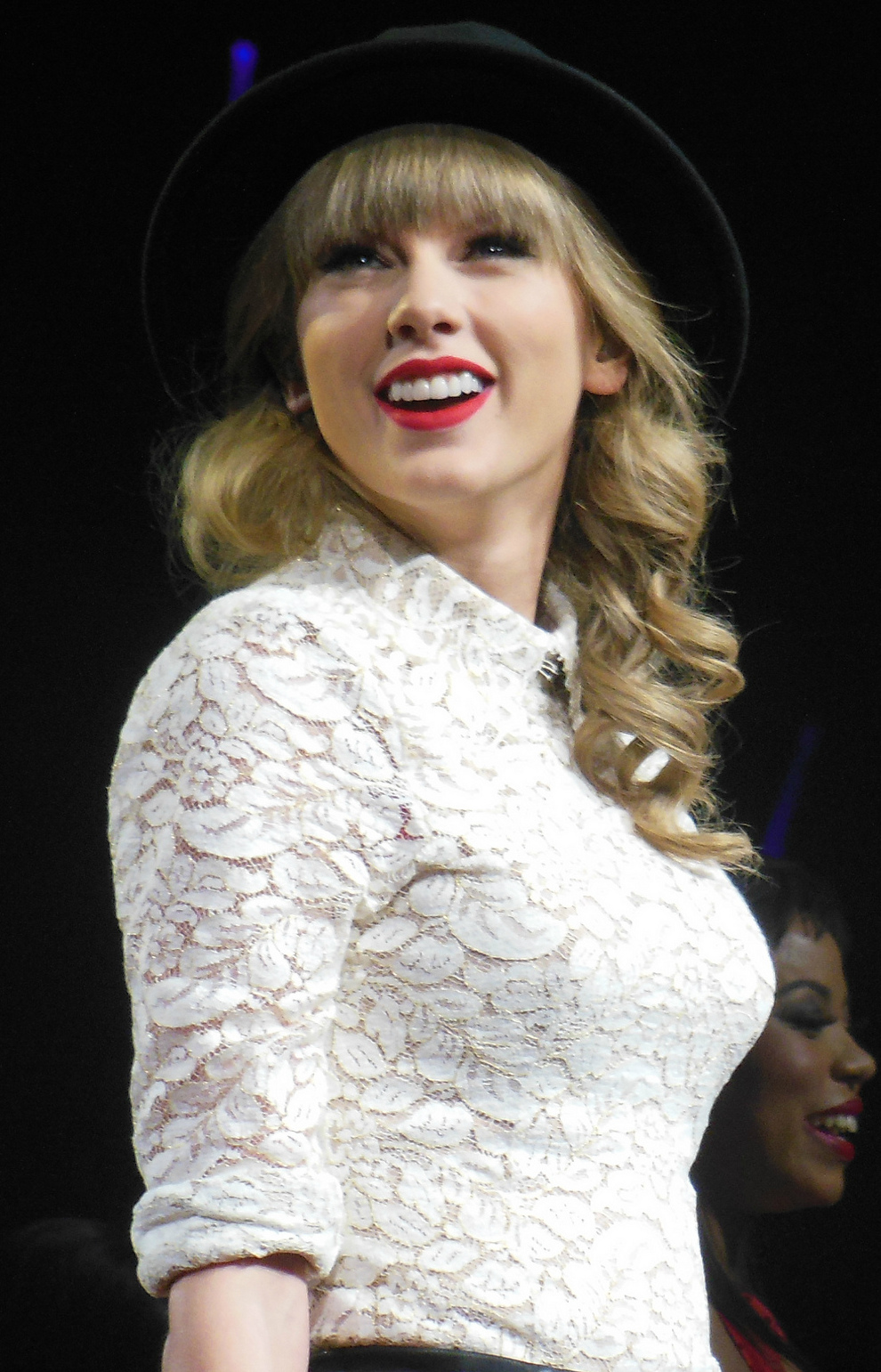
Taylor Swift was one of the most successful country artists of the 2010s. Her albums Speak Now (2010) and Red (2012) topped charts and opened with more than a million copies sold in their first weeks.

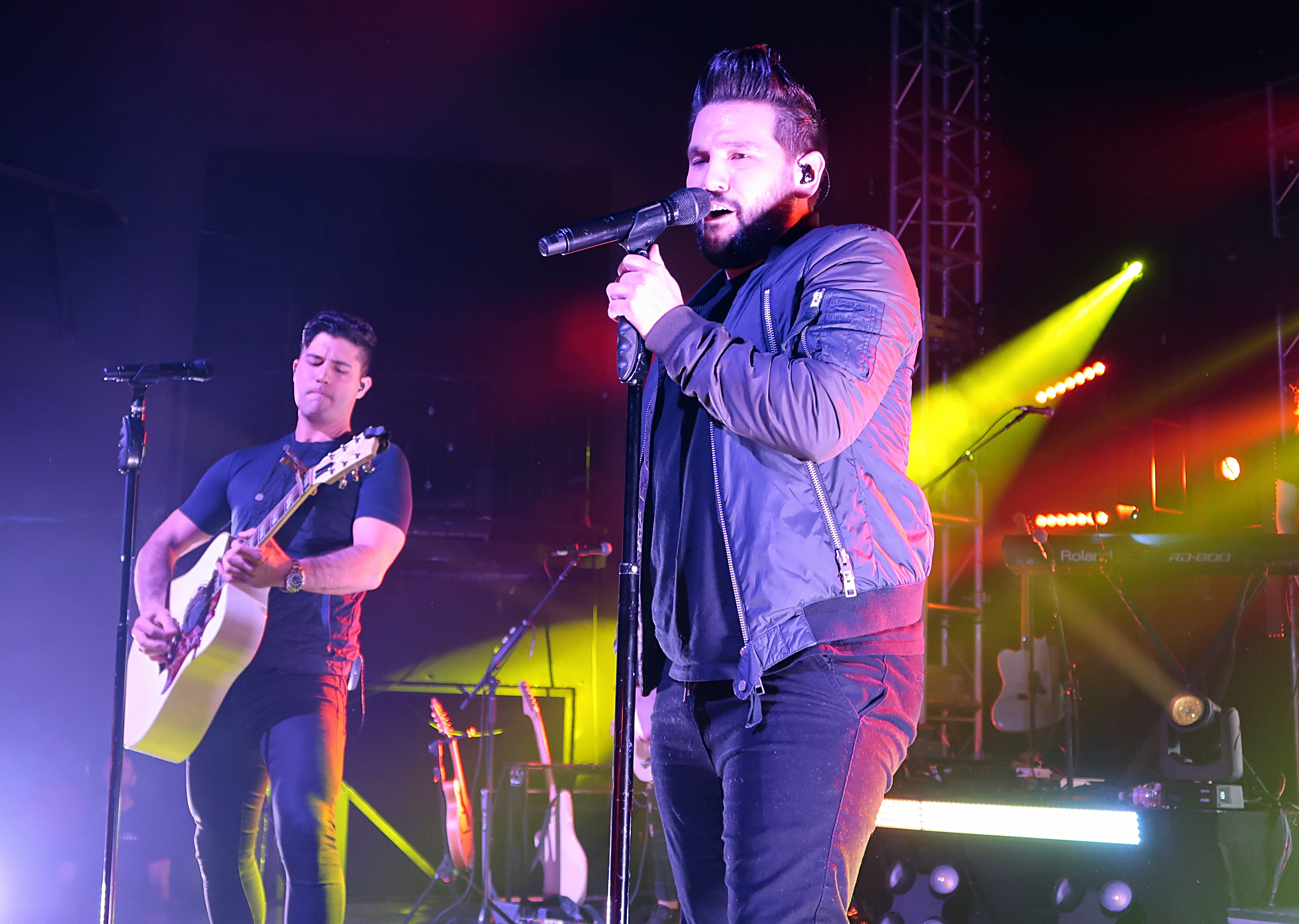
Country pop music duo Dan + Shay

Country had continued to maintain its popularity both as a radio format and in retail. The most popular country acts during this decade were Taylor Swift, Zac Brown Band, Carrie Underwood, Miranda Lambert, Jason Aldean, The Band Perry, Keith Urban, Luke Bryan, Blake Shelton, Lady Antebellum, Tim McGraw, George Strait, Toby Keith, Kenny Chesney, Florida Georgia Line, Brantley Gilbert, Eric Church, Dierks Bentley, Brad Paisley, Thomas Rhett, Cole Swindell, Rascal Flatts, Kacey Musgraves, Jake Owen, Dustin Lynch, Kip Moore, Little Big Town, Chris Young, Hunter Hayes, Cam, Sam Hunt, Lee Brice, Eli Young Band, Darius Rucker, Randy Houser, Kelsea Ballerini, Maren Morris, Billy Currington, Tyler Farr, Brett Eldredge, Sturgill Simpson, Chris Stapleton, Luke Combs, Kane Brown, Jon Pardi, Elle King and Brett Young.

A large number of duos and vocal groups had begun to emerge on the charts during the 2010s, many of which feature close harmony in the lead vocals, a style that roots as far back as the 1940s and 1950s with acts, like The Shelton Brothers, Delmore Brothers, and Everly Brothers. It saw a resurgence in the 1980s with The Judds and The Bellamy Brothers. Examples of successful duos were Florida Georgia Line, Love and Theft, Dan + Shay, The Howboy Catts, and Thompson Square. In addition to Lady Antebellum, bands, such as The Band Perry, Gloriana, Eli Young Band, and Zac Brown Band had come to occupy a large portion of the new, popular country players. Meanwhile, artists who began their careers as far back as the 1960s and 1970s had continued to be active, including Willie Nelson, Dolly Parton, Loretta Lynn, Kenny Rogers, Alabama, The Oak Ridge Boys, George Strait, and Reba McEntire.

In September 2016, "Forever Country", a medley of three classic country songs – "Take Me Home, Country Roads", "On the Road Again" and "I Will Always Love You"—was recorded to honor the 50th Annual Country Music Association Awards. A celebration of traditional country music and the genre's ongoing popularity, the song blended together 30 stars, ranging from newcomers to veteran to classic stars and acts of the genre. A similar medley, featuring many of the same stars that performed on "Forever Country" but with different songs, was performed at the CMA Awards.

==== Hip-hop's influence on country ====
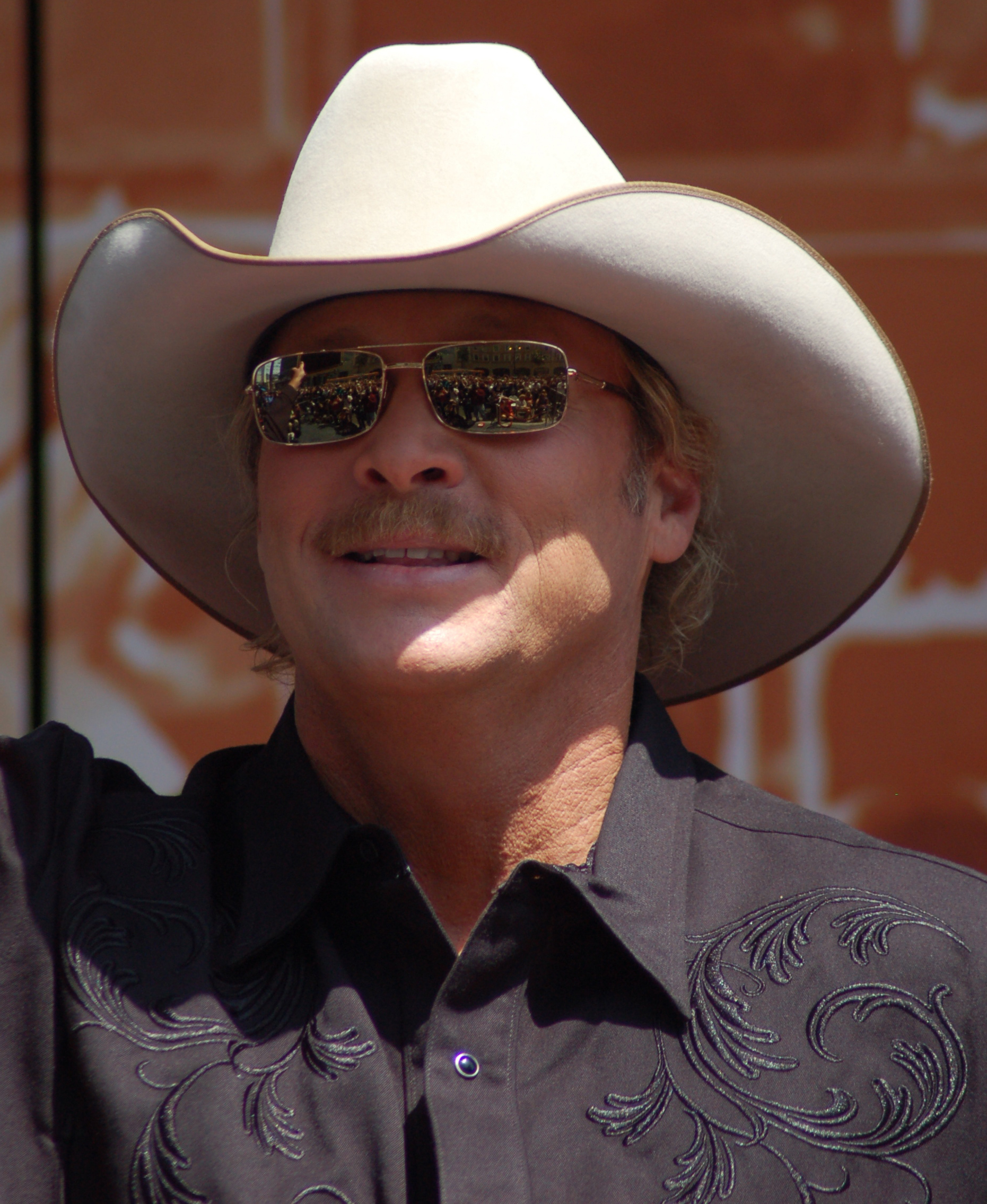
Alan Jackson

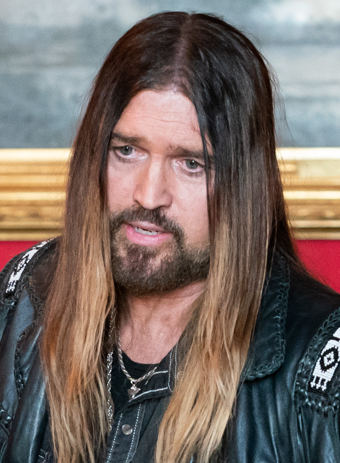
Billy Ray Cyrus

Several popular country songs have taken influence from 21st-century hip-hop, rock, and pop and have had themes of partying, attractive young women, blue jeans, Southern rock, and pickup trucks. These characteristics are typical in a subgenre known as bro-country. Instrumentalists embracing this trend were Jason Aldean, Luke Bryan, Eric Church, Florida Georgia Line, Brantley Gilbert, and several others, with songs, like "Cruise", "That's My Kind of Night", and Blake Shelton's "Boys 'Round Here" having been the most widespread songs in terms of sales and downloads. While many of the themes of bro-country songs -– in particular, women and alcohol –- have always been a part of country music (particularly since the rise of honky tonk styles in the 1940s), the new genre came under fire by listeners, music reviewers, and classic country musicians such as Alan Jackson and Gary Allan, and was satirized in the song "Girl in a Country Song" by the duo Maddie & Tae. The shifting styles also played a role in a brief feud between Shelton and country legend Ray Price in 2013, just months before Price's death, after Shelton remarked that "Nobody wants to listen to their grandpa's music" and that younger consumers weren't buying or downloading classic country music because the styles and sounds of songs from the past didn't appeal to them. Price –- who, unlike several of his peers, usually kept quiet in the debate on classic country vs. more modern music –- expressed his disapproval via his Facebook page, stating that it was their styles and success that helped make newer stars' careers possible and paved the way to modern country music. Shelton later retracted his statement, and Price accepted his apology.

In March 2019, the song "Old Town Road", a song performed by American rap artist Lil Nas X (born Montero Hill), began gaining popularity with country music fans, particularly after a remix of the song featuring vocals by Billy Ray Cyrus was released earlier in the year. The song combined elements of country rap, hip-hop, Southern hip-hop and trap, and used themes of horseback riding and culture clash with urban America in its lyrics. The song became the first to chart on all three of the major Billboard charts – Hot 100, Hot R&B/Hip-Hop Songs and Hot Country Songs – in nearly 60 years, charting at No. 19 on the country chart. However, one week after its debut on the country chart, Billboard removed the song from the chart, disqualifying the song on the grounds that it did not fit the country genre. There was speculation that had the song remained on the chart, it would have reached No. 1 as of the chart dated April 6, 2019. Later in 2019, hip-hop music producer Blanco Brown recorded and released "The Git Up", which was called a "sequel" and "next viral country rap song".

The rise in use and influence of elements of hip-hop music and related styles in country music – as seen in both the "bro-country" and trap country movements – as well as issues related to Shelton's comments and continued popularity of country pop – once again sparked the longstanding debate over what defines "real" country music, an issue that has recurred since the 1970s.

==== Tragedy and deaths of classic stars ====
The decade also saw death and tragedy in country. Mindy McCready, a rising star of the late 1990s whose personal problems soon overshadowed her music, committed suicide during early 2013. Glen Campbell, a influential country guitarist and vocalist from the 1960s onward, was diagnosed with Alzheimer's disease in late 2010 and consequently retired from show business in 2013; he died in 2017. Randy Travis, a neo-traditionalist star who helped revive the genre in the mid-to-late 1980s, had several run-ins with the law in 2012 and in 2013 suffered a massive stroke. Troy Gentry of Montgomery Gentry was killed in a helicopter crash in 2017. Also in 2017, 58 concertgoers at the Route 91 Harvest festival event in Las Vegas, Nevada – where Jason Aldean was performing at the time gunfire broke out – were killed in a mass shooting; Aldean escaped the incident uninjured and a week later paid tribute to the victims on Saturday Night Live.

Prominent classic country players who had died during the decade, besides Glen Campbell, were Carl Smith, Jimmy Dean, Ferlin Husky, Kitty Wells, Patti Page, Jack Greene, Slim Whitman, George Jones, Ray Price, Little Jimmy Dickens, Lynn Anderson, Jim Ed Brown, Sonny James, Merle Haggard, Jean Shepard, Don Williams, Mel Tillis, Freddie Hart, Roy Clark, Dave Rowland (lead singer of the 1970s trio Dave and Sugar), Earl Thomas Conley and all three of the Glaser Brothers (Tompall in 2013, and brothers Jim and Chuck in 2019). Besides Mindy McCready and Troy Gentry, several performers from the late 1980s, 1990s and later also died: Kevin Sharp, Holly Dunn, Lari White and Daryle Singletary. Also, Glenn Frey, a member of Eagles, a rock band whose style has been influential in country from the 1970s onward, died during the decade. Longtime radio personality Bob Kingsley, who hosted the radio programs American Country Countdown and Bob Kingsley's Country Top 40, died in the fall of 2019, shortly after revealing his diagnosis of cancer.

=== Christian ===
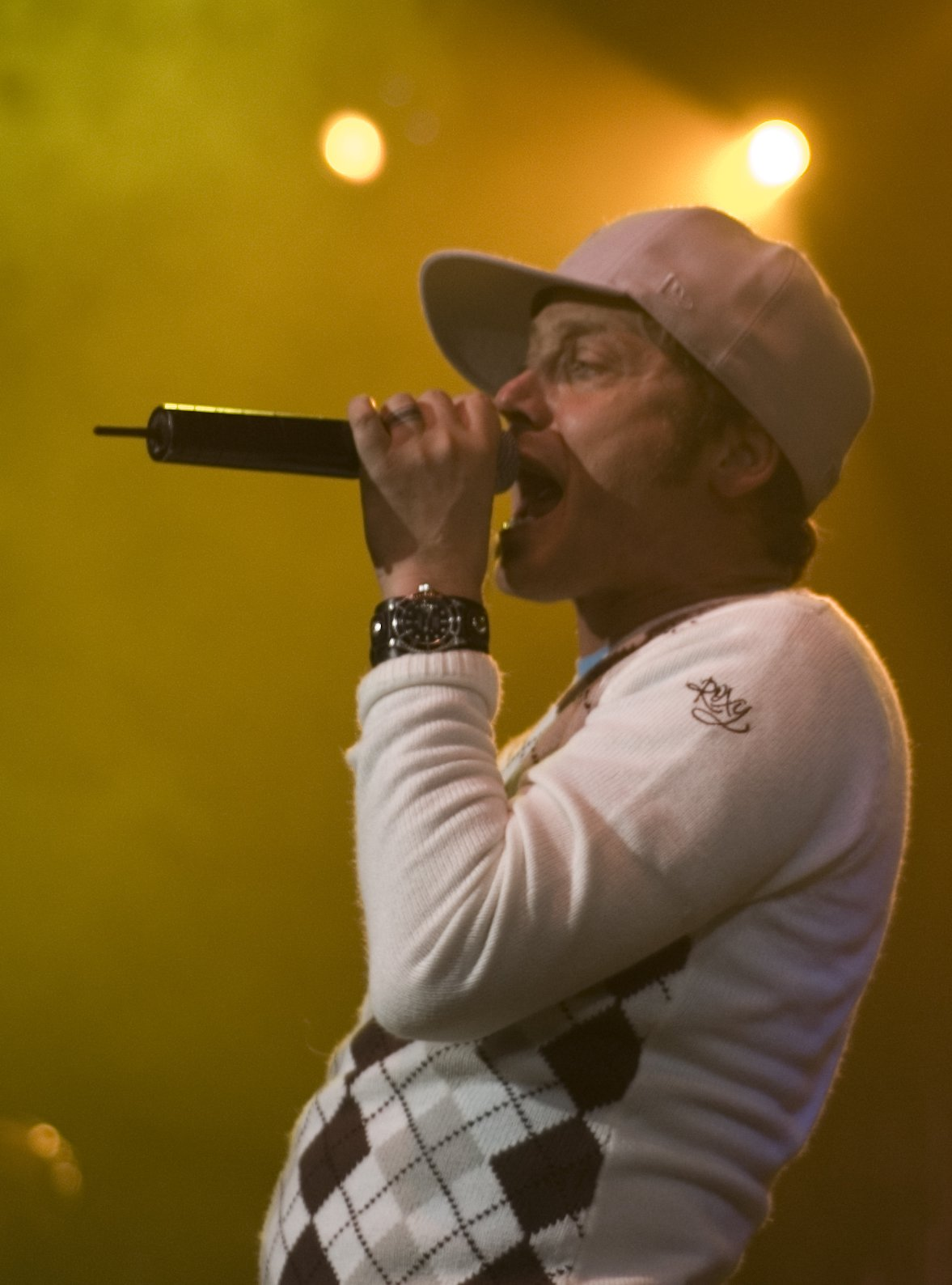
TobyMac's 2012 album Eye on It became the third Christian album to ever debut at number 1 on the Billboard 200.

Christian music saw a rise in success during the early 2010s, with several artists debuting within the top 5 on the Billboard 200. In 2011, the Christian instrumentalists Casting Crowns and Red both debuted at number 2 on the Billboard 200, with their respective albums Come to the Well and Until We Have Faces. David Crowder Band also reached number 2 with Give Us Rest during 2012. Today's Christian Music reported that Passion: White Flag, a live album of the performances of various musicians at the 2012 Passion Conference, debuted at number 5 on the Billboard 200. On 28 August 2012, the TobyMac album Eye on It debuted at number 1 on that chart, the first Christian album since 1997 and third overall to do so. The very next week, Christian hip-hop artist Lecrae debuted at number 3 on the Billboard 200 with Gravity. Additionally, both the number 1 and 2 spots on the iTunes hip-hop charts were taken by the deluxe and standard versions of the album. The commercial reception of Gravity was called "easily the biggest sales week ever for a Christian rap album." In January 2013, Chris Tomlin became the fourth Christian player to top the Billboard 200 with his seventh studio album Burning Lights. 73,000 units were sold in its debut week. Lecrae then topped the Billboard 200 during September 2014 with his album Anomaly, selling 88,000 units in its debut week. This not only established Lecrae as the fifth artist to top the chart, but it also marked the first time that an artist reached number 1 on both the Billboard 200 and Top Gospel charts. Following – and partially due to – Lecrae's peak on the Gospel chart, Billboard revised its standards for the chart, rendering most hip-hop releases ineligible.

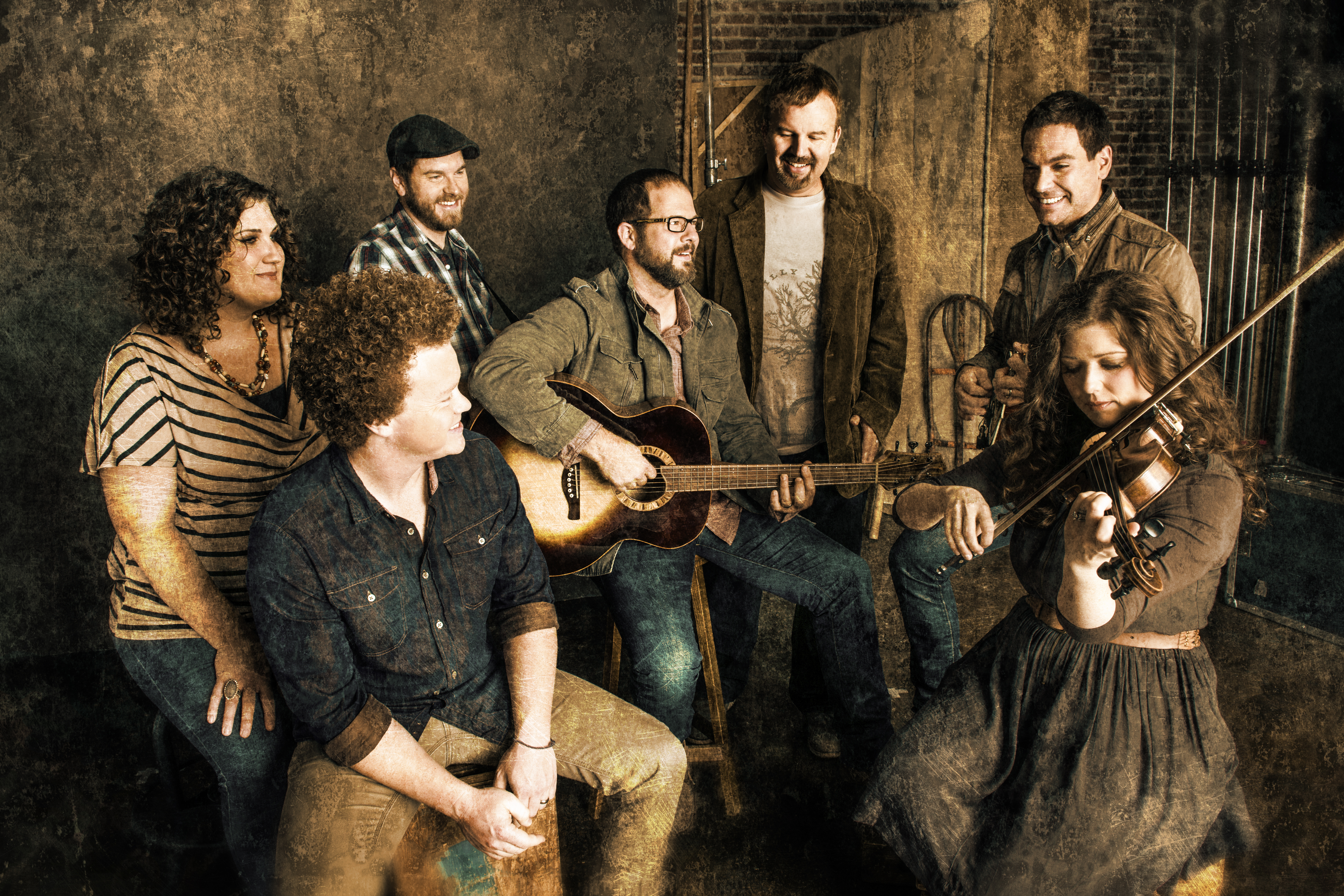
Casting Crowns

The success of TobyMac and Lecrae prompted an article in Time that examined the recent upsurge in crossover success of Christian instrumentalists. The magazine referred to Rod Riley of Word Entertainment as an indication that all of these successes could "be the tip of the iceberg." Riley had cited the increasing talent of Christian musicians and the ownership of all major Christian record labels by widespread parents as a reason for the success of Christian. According to Time, TobyMac and the rock band Skillet had been featured in NFL telecasts, TobyMac's music was also listed by Time as a factor in the rise of Christian. Producer Mark Joseph claimed in an article by Fox News that TobyMac reaching number 1 was just one more example of the mainstreaming of "'so-called Christian music that his [sic] happening all around us'". He further stated that "'the pop and rock charts are filled with artists who used to be in that industry like Katy Perry, Switchfoot and Joy Williams of The Civil Wars, but also by young devout performers who in the past might have gone into that industry, like Justin Bieber, Mumford & Sons, The Fray, Cold War Kids and Twenty One Pilots.'" Following Lecrae's performance on BET and appearance on Statik Selektah's Population Control, in Chad Horton, co-owner of the website Rapzilla, stated that "Christian hip-hop" had-in the past two years-"pushed into the mainstream more than ever before," and citing part of its cause as better music quality presentation than "any other time before" in January 2012.

== Europe ==
=== Pop ===
Contemporary R&B, as well as classic soul, had defined much of the UK's mainstream music in the early to mid-2010s. Notable artists who encompass this sound include Jessie J and Adele. As with previous decades, pop had enjoyed chart domination, with popular instrumentalists, such as Cher Lloyd, Birdy, Jessie Ware, James Blunt, Sam Smith, Rag'n'Bone Man, Calum Scott, Lily Allen, Clean Bandit, Rixton, Disclosure, La Roux, Shura, AlunaGeorge, James Blake, Róisín Murphy, Olly Murs, M.I.A., London Grammar, FKA Twigs, Echosmith, Jamie xx, The xx, Lukas Graham, Ed Sheeran, Rita Ora, Zayn Malik, Chvrches, Years & Years, Charli XCX, James Bay, Dua Lipa, Jay Sean, Paloma Faith, Emeli Sandé, Taio Cruz, Florence and the Machine, Cheryl Cole, The Saturdays, Ellie Goulding, Marina and the Diamonds, Zara Larsson, Passenger, Ella Eyre, Jess Glynne, Becky Hill, Ella Henderson, Jorja Smith, Ylvis, Lykke Li and Katy B. Teen pop boy bands-despite being unpopular for much of the 2000s-had returned to widespread popularity, with acts, including One Direction and The Wanted, having seen major commercial success worldwide. French singer Zaz was one of very few singers to have become internationally mainstream since Vanessa Paradis. The girlbands also had success, one of them being the winners of the eighth season of The X Factor, Little Mix, who are credited for helping the girl band renaissance in the UK during the late 2000s and into the early 2010s.

Legendary British band Take That remained very popular, alongside its former member Robbie Williams, who released successful albums and singles.

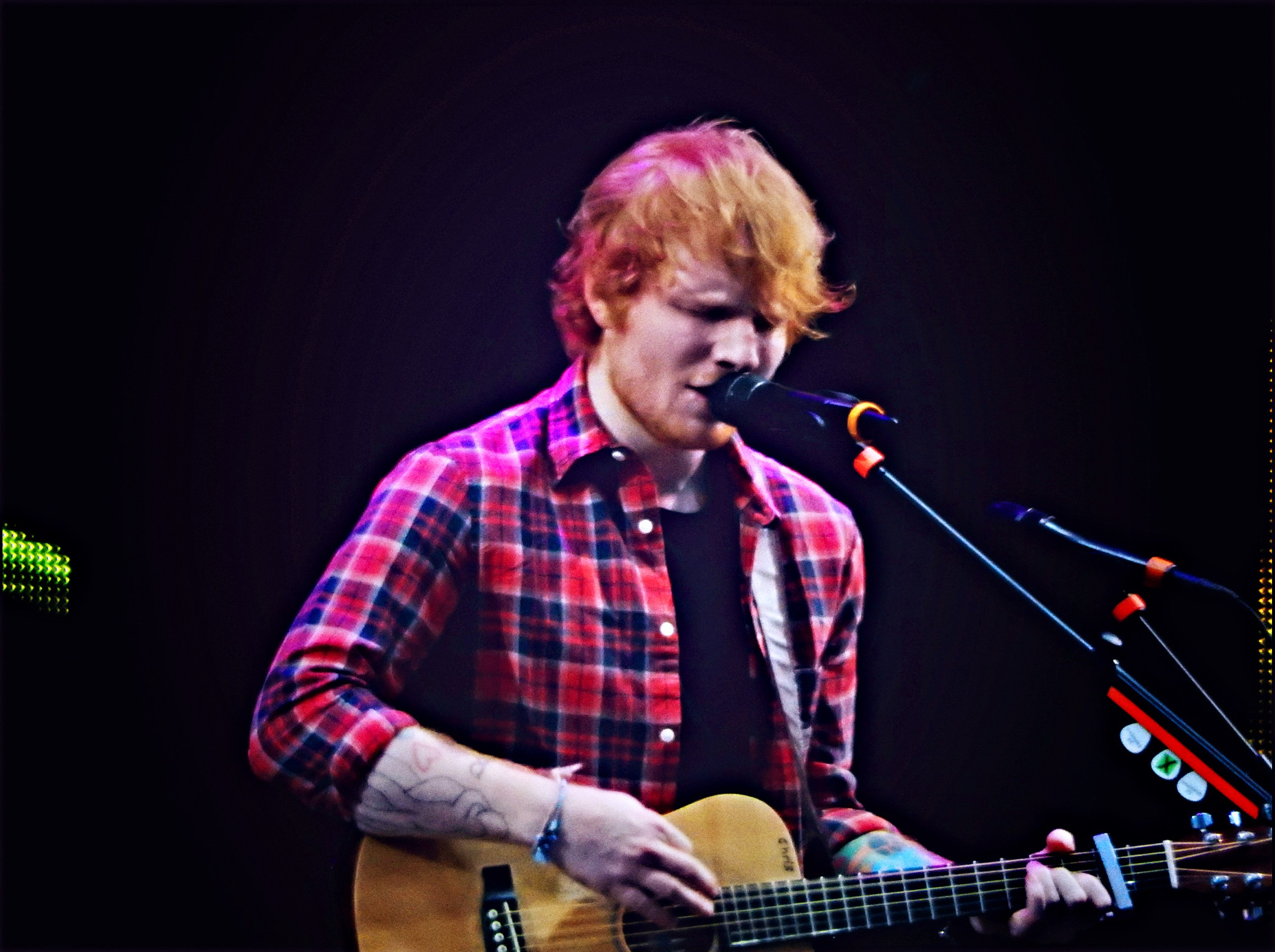
Ed Sheeran performing at the V Festival in 2014

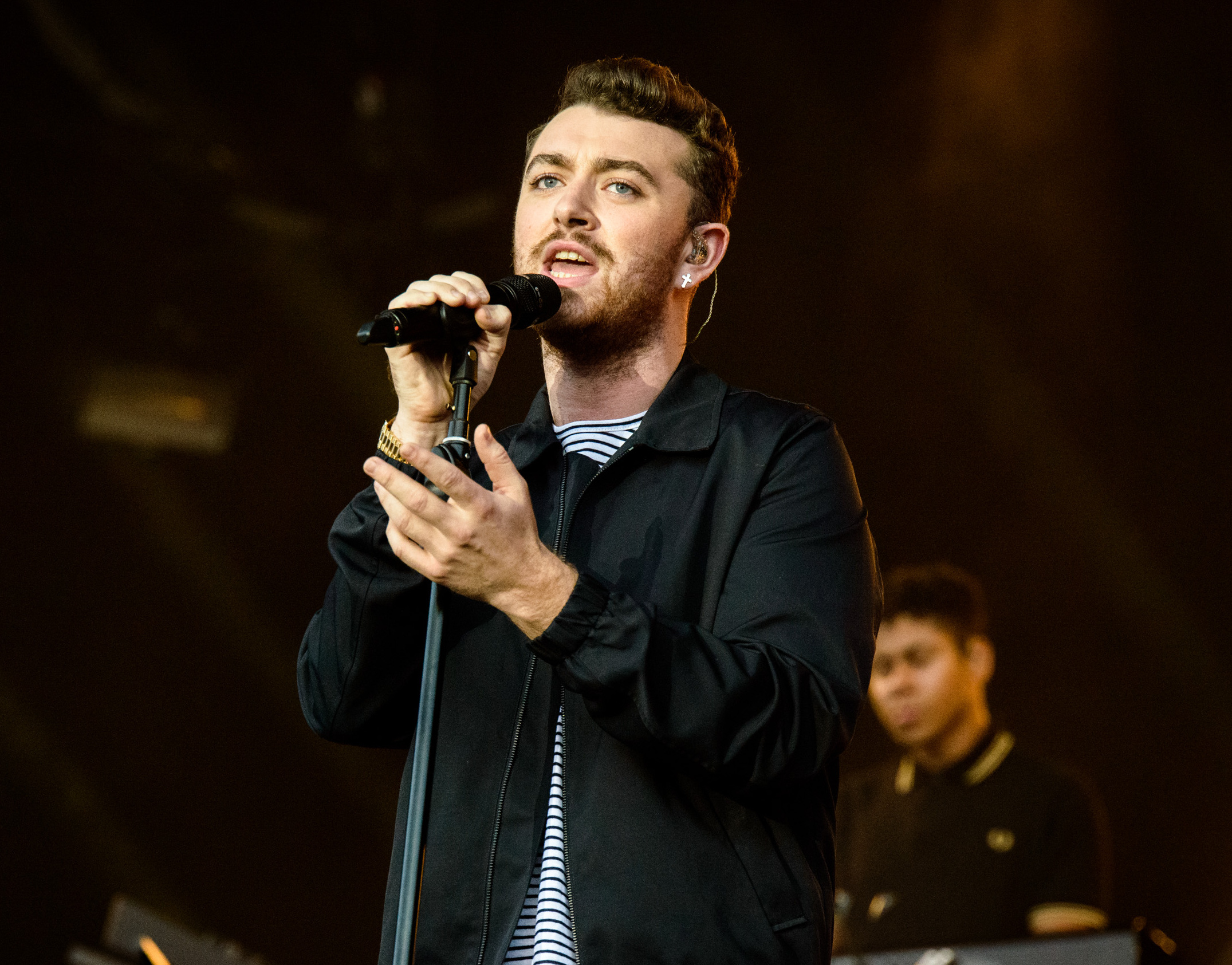
Sam Smith performing at Lollapalooza in 2015

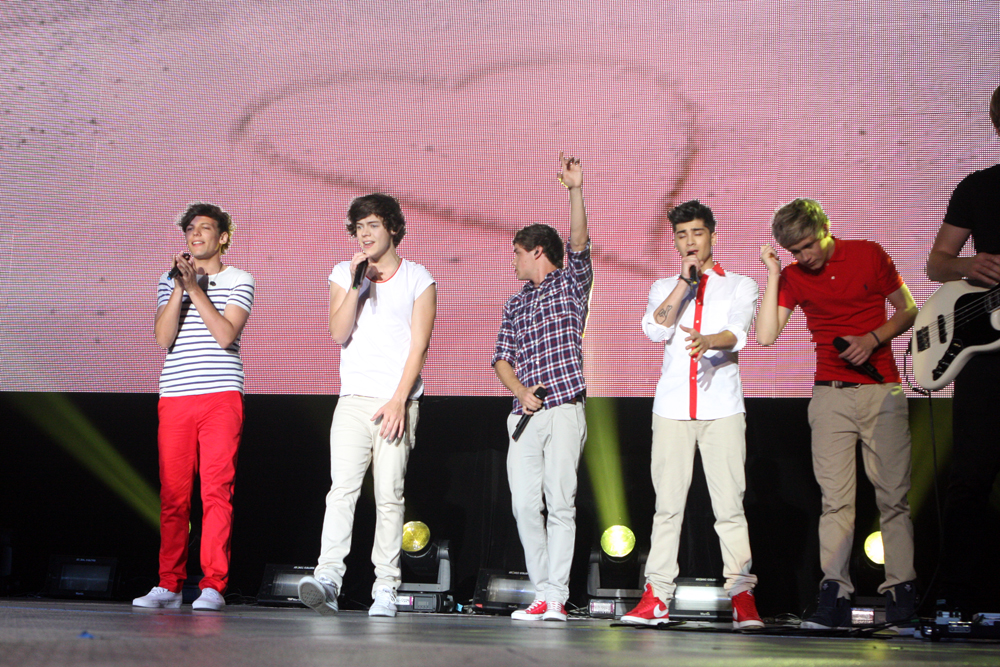
The British boy band One Direction in their Up All Night Tour, 2012

=== Soul ===
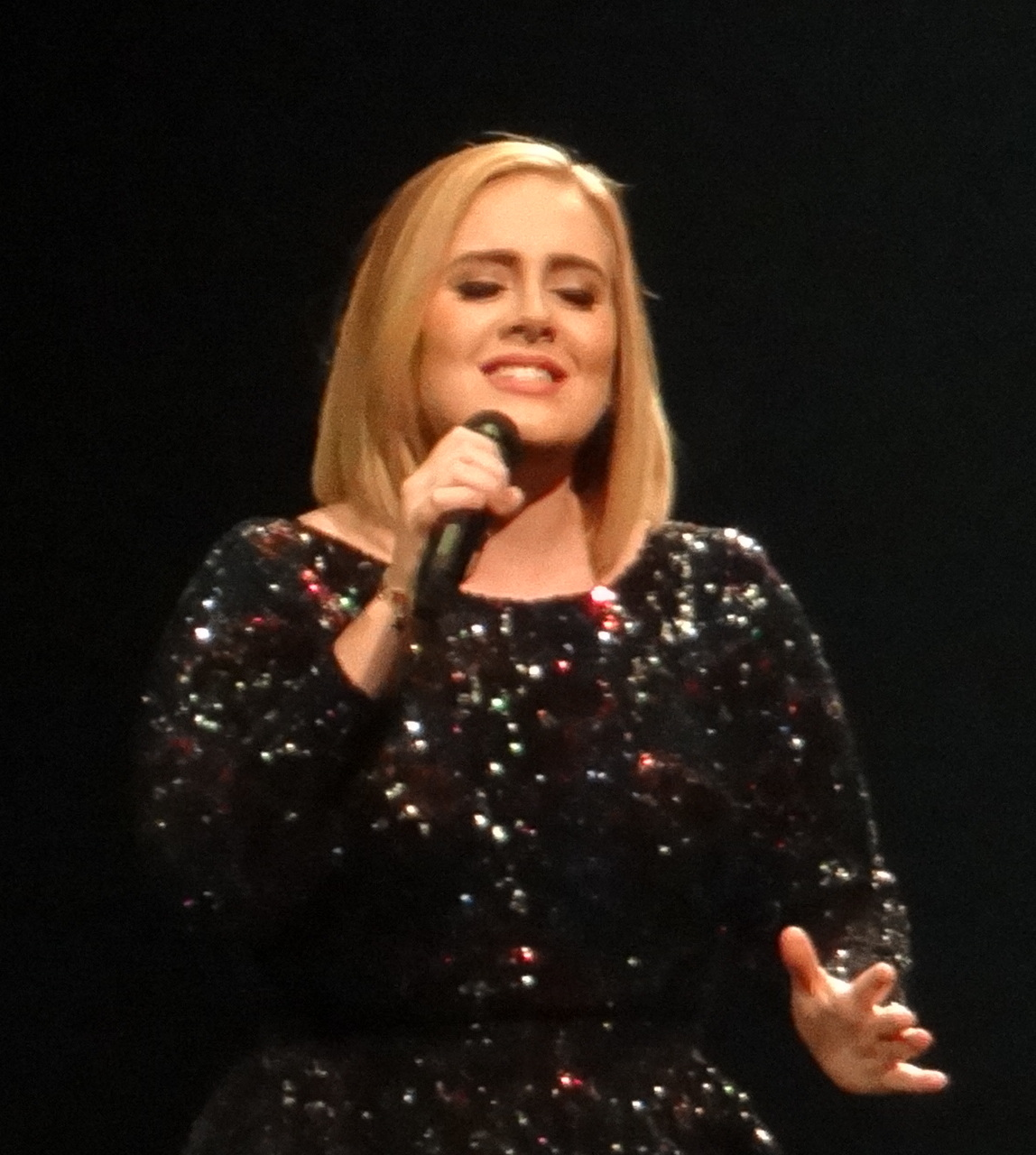
Adele during this decade established herself as the best selling British female artist of all time. Her 21 (2011) and 25 (2015) became two of the best selling albums of the 2010s.

English singer-songwriter Adele, after releasing her debut album in 2008, rose to global superstardom with the release of her second studio album 21 (2011), which topped the charts in over 30 countries and became one of the biggest selling albums of all-time as well as the best selling album of the 21st century. Her third album 25 (2015), attained even further success, debuting at number one in 32 countries and became the fastest selling album of all-time.

=== Rock ===
Alternative rock had experienced a modest presence in the United Kingdom singles chart during the 2010s, mostly from artists originating in the previous decade, including Kasabian, Arctic Monkeys, Gorillaz, Coldplay, The Wombats, Muse, Mumford & Sons, and Snow Patrol. Bands like Two Door Cinema Club, Foals, and Bombay Bicycle Club, which emerged in the late 2000s, had succeeded in the album chart. The genre had had a stronger presence album-wise, with acts such as The 1975, Bastille, alt-J, and The Vaccines enjoying success. Bastille had scored two number 2 singles on the UK chart, with their sound bordering on mainstream pop music in the charts. Royal Blood was the first band formed during the decade to win a Brit Award for the best British group in 2014, only one year after forming. Royal Blood's sound is similar to 2000s garage rock, and they received positive reviews upon the release of their debut album.

European rock had also seen the return of successful artists from the past. David Bowie-in particular had two UK number 1 albums—The Next Day and Blackstar. Upon its release, The Next Day (2013) became Bowie's most successful album in 30 years, followed by Blackstar (2016).

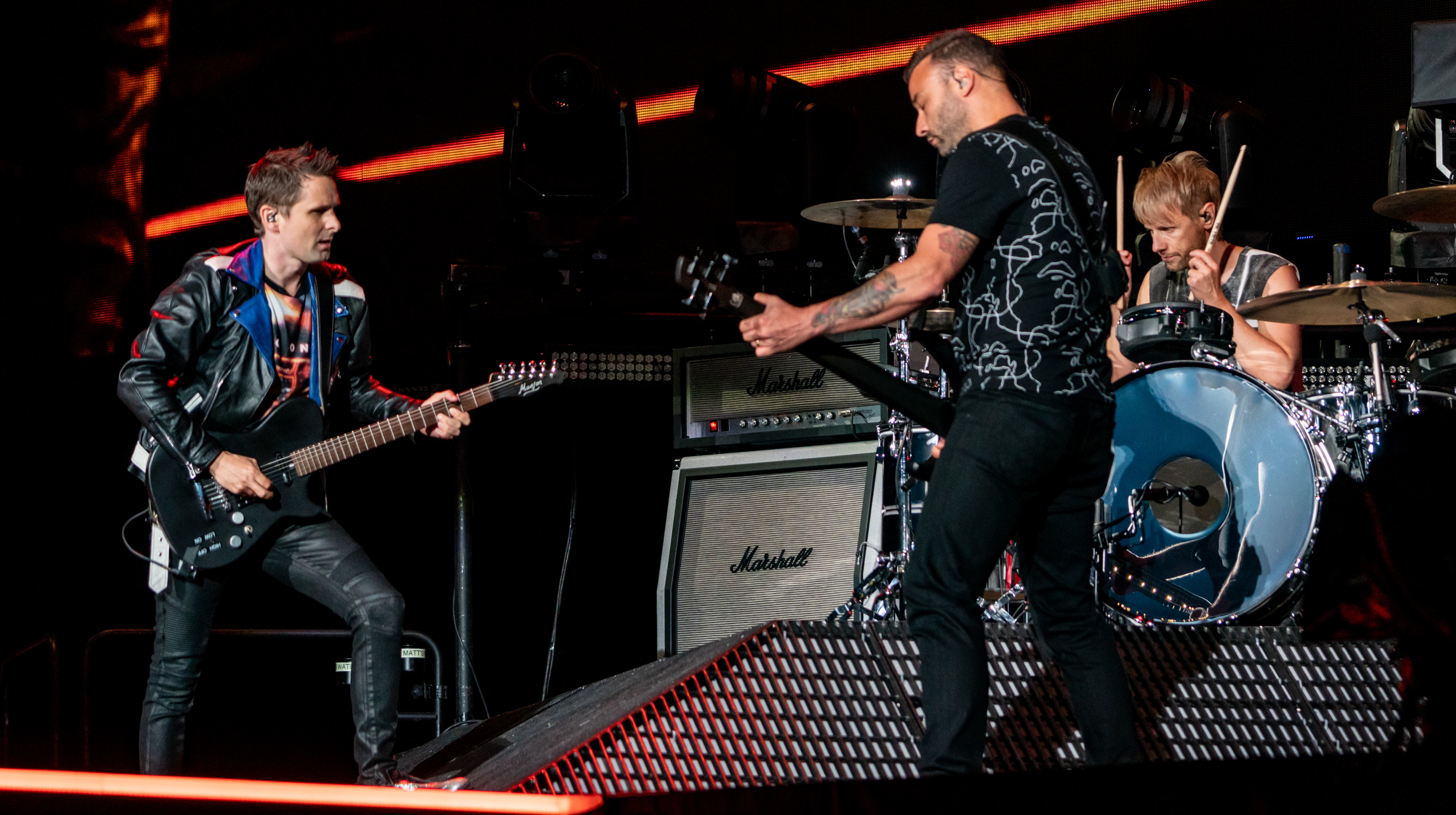
Muse

Acts, including Tribes, White Lies, The Maccabees, Miles Kane and Hard-Fi, had also witnessed success, mostly exclusive to the album chart.

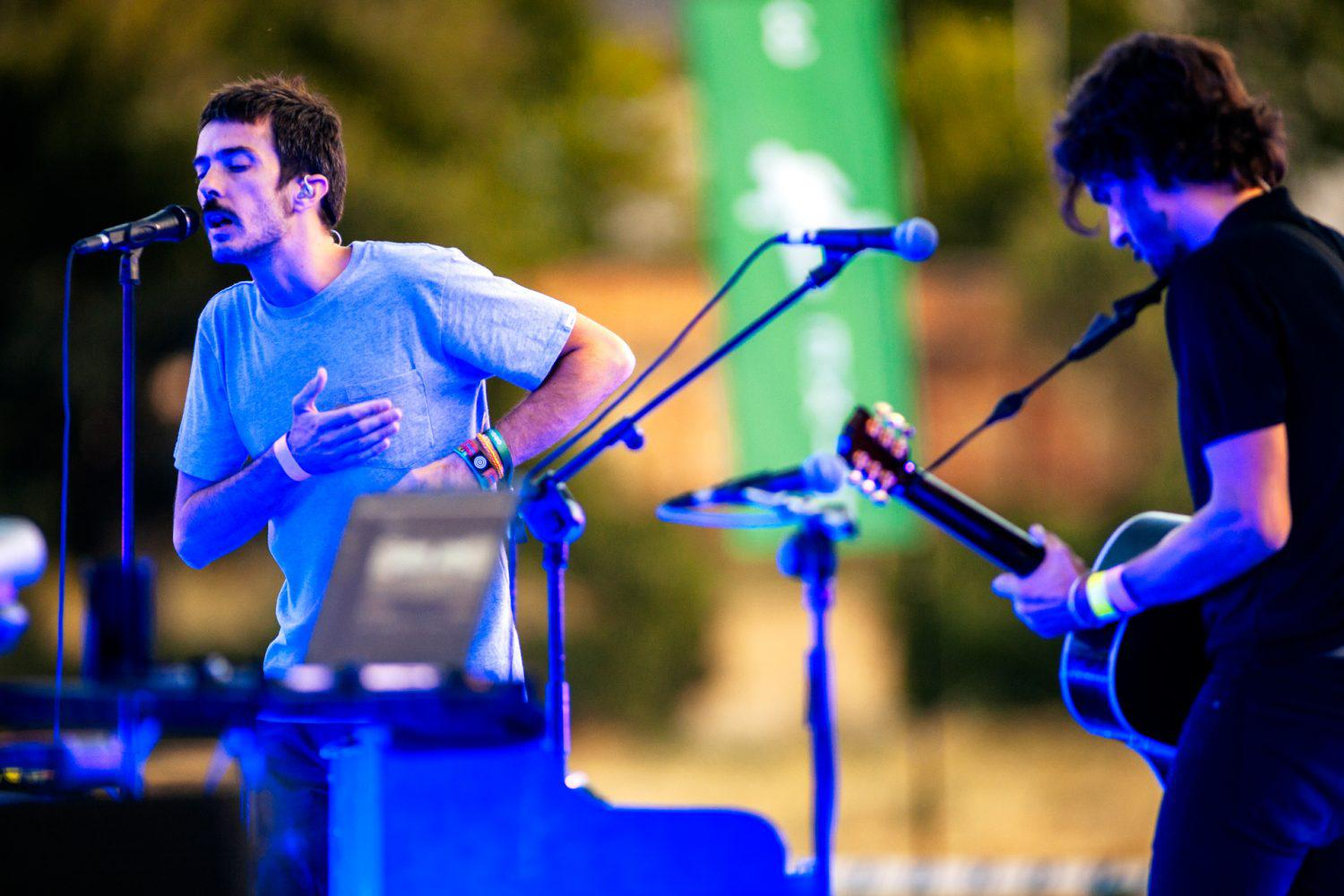
Vetusta Morla

Heavy metal and hard rock had been seeing a relatively increased presence in the UK albums chart, thanks to releases by Bullet For My Valentine and Enter Shikari. Many new British heavy metal bands are seeing worldwide success after years of American dominance, primarily Bring Me the Horizon and Asking Alexandria, although the latter entirely moved to the U.S. in 2009. There was also a resurgence of the German metal scene from the 1980s to achieve commercial success during the 2010s, with bands like Accept and Kreator achieving their first number one albums on the German charts.

A grassroots punk scene continued in the UK, mainly built around the hub of the annual Rebellion Festival in Blackpool. The 2010s saw a particular profusion of younger female or female-fronted bands affiliated to the punk scene.

In northern Europe, especially Sweden, 1980s glam metal had seen something of a revival from acts like Hardcore Superstar, Crazy Lixx, Crashdïet, H.E.A.T, and Reckless Love. Sweden's Sabaton had also been successful, as had the Finnish symphonic metal band Nightwish.

In eastern Europe, acts like Repetitor, Vizija, Bernays Propaganda, ZAA and Artan Lili become successful with their experimenting in the music.

=== Folk ===
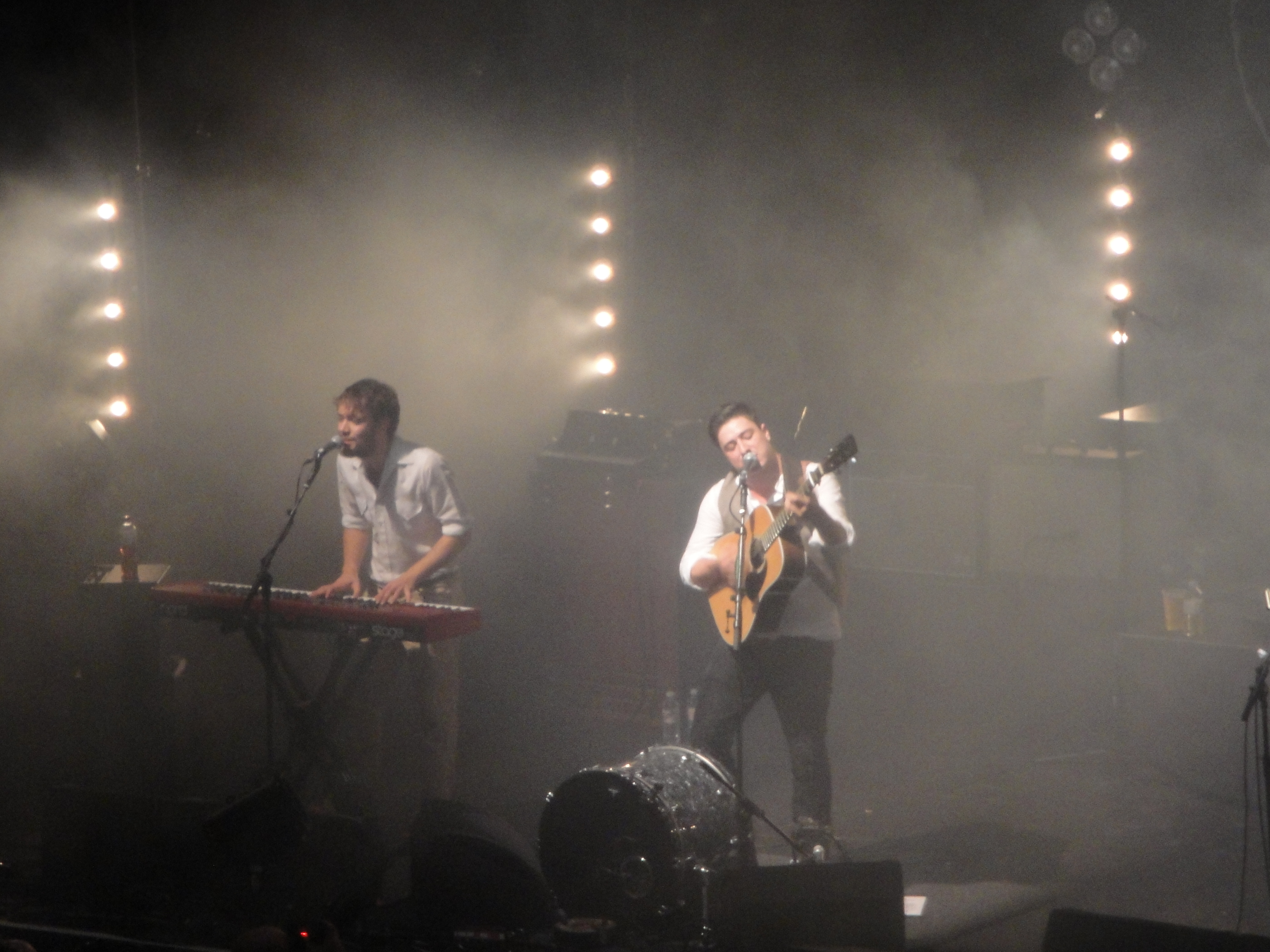
Mumford & Sons were considered one of the most successful British bands of the early 2010s.

Folk witnessed a large growth during the early 2010s in the UK. The most widespread British folk musician was Mumford & Sons, who won a 2011 Brit Award for "Best Album" and had enjoyed commercial success in both Europe and North America. Another notable player and winner of "Best British Female" at the 2011 BRIT Awards was Laura Marling. Other successful acts were Ed Sheeran, George Ezra, Hozier, Jake Bugg, Johnny Flynn, Noah and the Whale, Bon Iver, Ben Howard, Gabrielle Aplin, Nina Nesbitt and Alessi's Ark.

=== Electronic ===
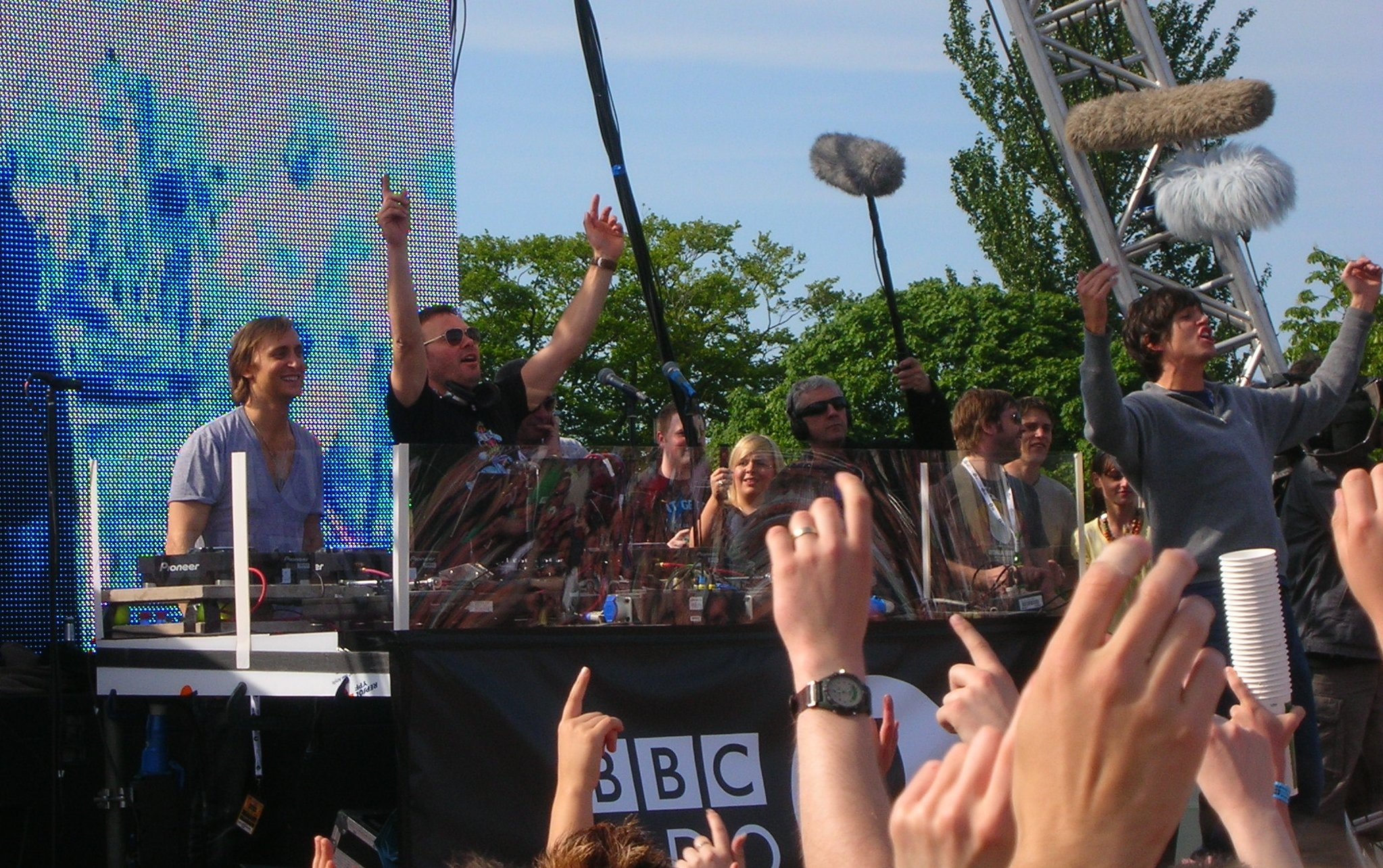
David Guetta (left) performing for BBC Radio 1 in 2007

Dubstep and drumstep started to become popular by 2010. This was particularly true in Britain, where it evolved from UK Garage, a genre that became widespread during the early 2000s. DJ Snake is known for having introduced trap into the mainstream in Europe during 2013. Eurodance-which has been consistently popular in Europe since the early 1990s-had become popular outside Europe, in a more modern style than the first wave into North America in the 1980s and early 1990s. The emergence and commercial success of Dutch house and the associated 'big room' house style had also brought electronic musicians from the continent to the global forefront. In the mid-2010s, further development of house subgenres had been seen in the creations of future house and tropical house, with European players being influential figures within both. Prominent European disk jockeys during this decade were Avicii, Martin Garrix, Nicky Romero, Tiësto, Dimitri Vegas & Like Mike, Afrojack, Kygo, Mark Ronson, Calvin Harris, David Guetta, Naughty Boy, Rudimental and Zedd.

2014 saw the beginning of a grime revival in the UK, initiated by the success of Meridian Dan's "German Whip" featuring Big H and Jme. The song reached number 13 in the UK Singles Charts. Two months after that, Skepta reached number 21 in the UK Singles Chart with his single "That's Not Me" featuring his brother Jme. Two months later, Lethal Bizzle released the single "Rari WorkOut" featuring Jme and Tempa T, which also charted, peaking at number 11 in the UK Singles Charts. A wave of new successful young grime MC's also began to emerge, such as Stormzy, AJ Tracey, Novelist, Jammz, and Lady Leshurr.

== Oceania ==
=== Pop ===
Mainstream music by Australian artists had tended to be influenced by radio broadcasting more than any other country. Australian radio station Triple J had played a large role in promoting new Australian music, especially through the Triple J Hottest 100, a worldwide public poll on each individual's favourite music from each given year. During 2010, Australian pop instrumentalists to feature substantially in the countdown were Birds of Tokyo, Pendulum, Washington, and Triple J Unearthed group Gypsy & The Cat. Australian acts that were placed high on the countdown were Angus & Julia Stone, Little Red, Troye Sivan, Art vs. Science, Sia, Vance Joy and The Jezabels. The correlation between the Triple J Hottest 100, the ARIA singles chart, and iTunes singles chart had been distinctly evident. The number one song of 2010, "Big Jet Plane", reached number 6 on the iTunes singles chart and number 32 on the ARIA singles chart, the week following the announcement of the Hottest 100 on 26 January. In 2014, Iggy Azalea started to make hits on music charts worldwide, sparking a trend for female rappers. Sia had become one of the most famous Australian artists, since the release of "Titanium", to later become successful with her solo work, with the viral "Chandelier" music video.

During 2011, Australian musicians to feature substantially in the Hottest 100 countdown were Boy & Bear, Gotye, 360, Architecture in Helsinki, and Ball Park Music. Again, the correlation between the Hottest 100 and the growth of singles on the ARIA and iTunes singles charts in the week following was strong. Rapper 360 and his song, "Boys Like You", entered the Hottest 100 at number 8, and the following week, it rose to number 2 on the iTunes singles chart and number 3 on the ARIA singles chart. A similar movement included Matt Corby's "Brother"-number 3 in the 2011 Hottest 100 countdown-also rising to number three on the ARIA charts. The most prominent Australian song during 2011 and early 2012 was Gotye's "Somebody That I Used To Know" which reached number 1 in 11 countries, including Australia, New Zealand, Germany, Austria, Belgium, Canada, the United States and the United Kingdom. The song also reached number 1 on the Triple J Hottest 100 of 2011 countdown and featured New Zealander pop singer, Kimbra, who also placed three times on the Triple J Hottest 100 as a solo artist.

5 Seconds of Summer's single, "Youngblood" is the fourth highest selling Australian single of the 2010s decade and is the eleventh best-selling single in Australian history, selling over five million adjusted copies worldwide within the first six months of its release. With the release of "Youngblood", 5 Seconds of Summer became the first Australian act in 13 years to top the ARIA year-end chart and remain the second longest stint at number one in ARIA chart history. 5 Seconds of Summer became the second Australian band in history to have their first five full-length studio albums debut at number one on the ARIA albums chart.

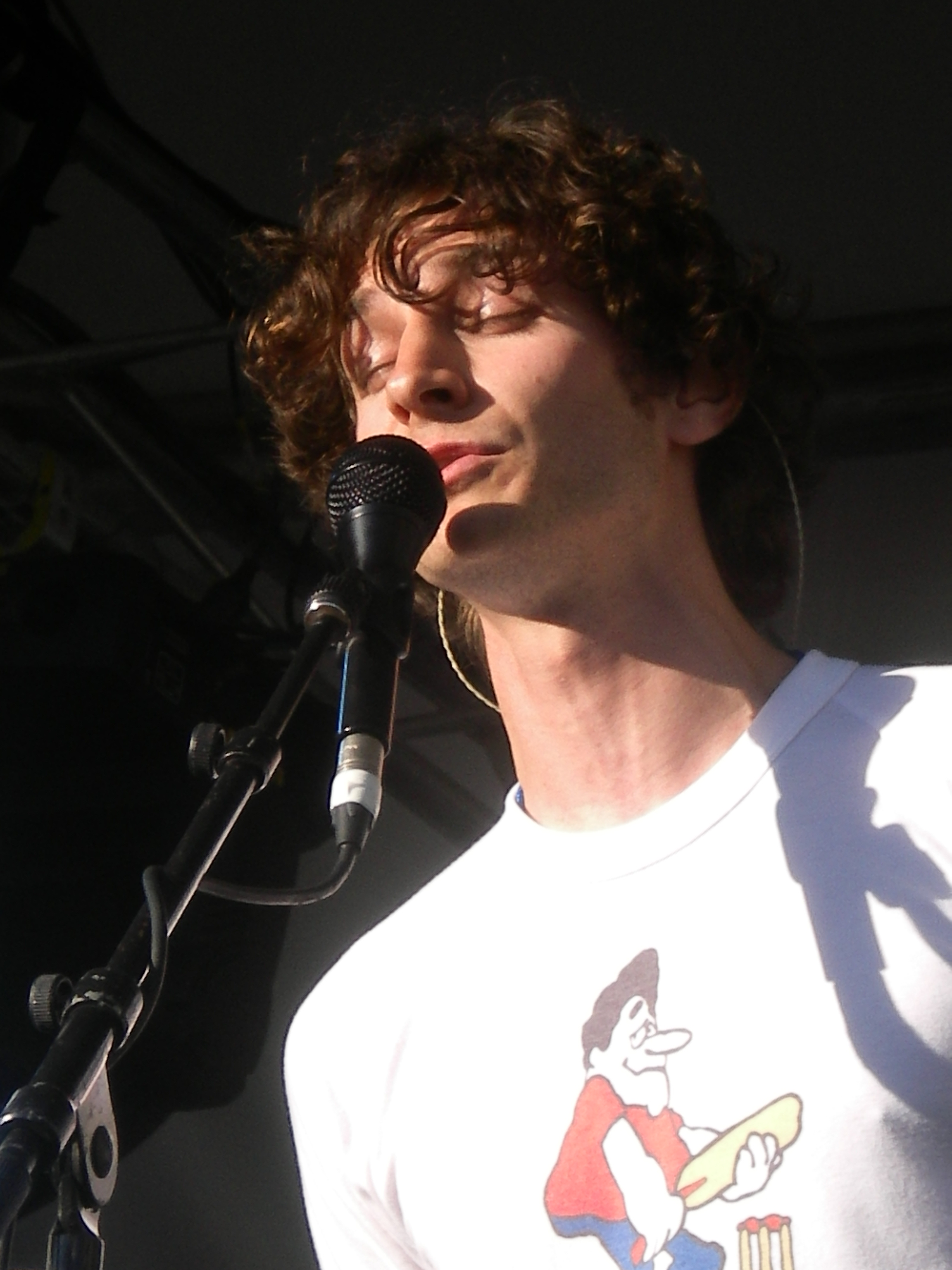
Gotye was one of the most successful Australian artists of the early 2010s.

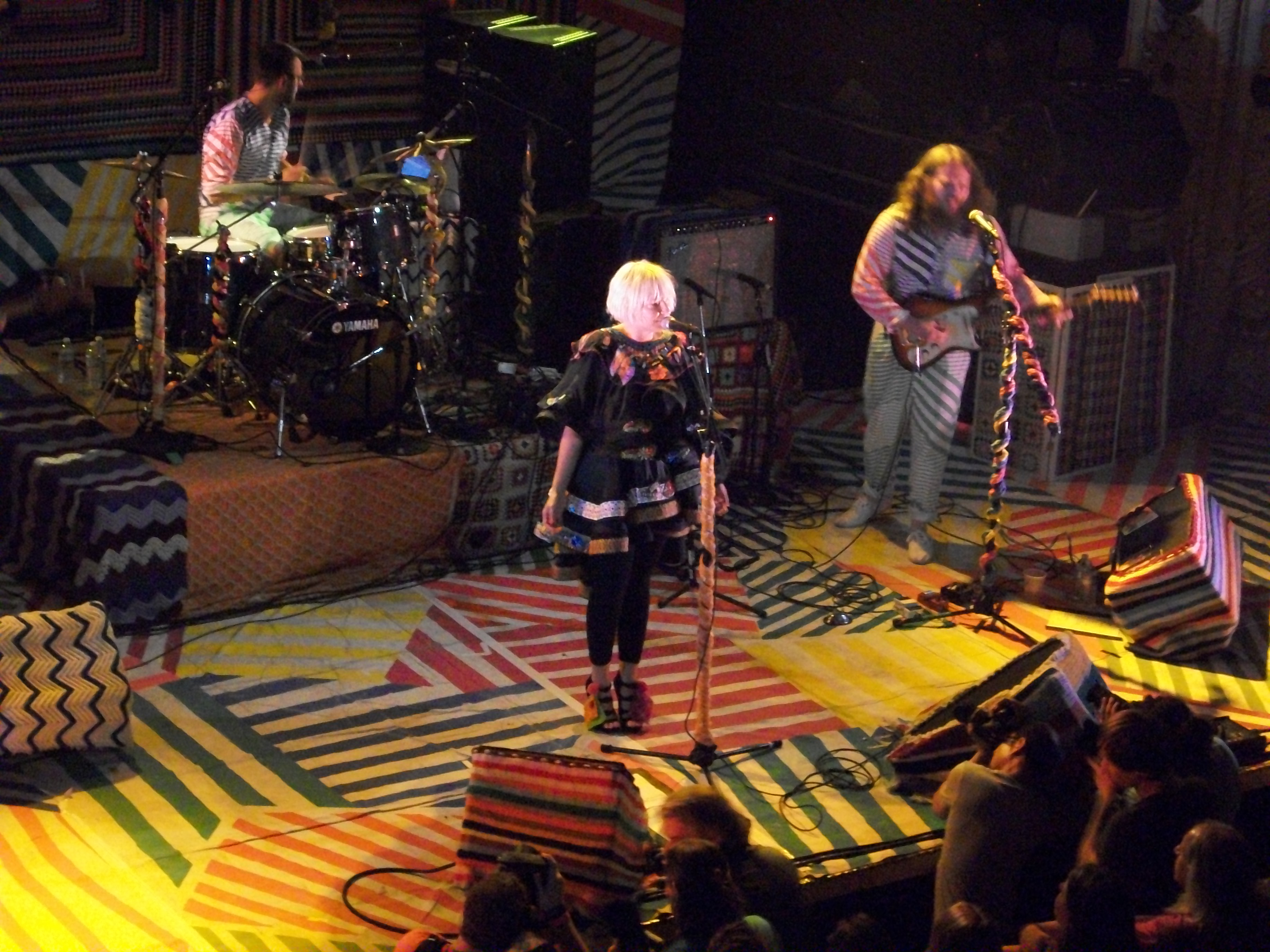
Sia, a photo taken at the We Are Born Tour during 2011

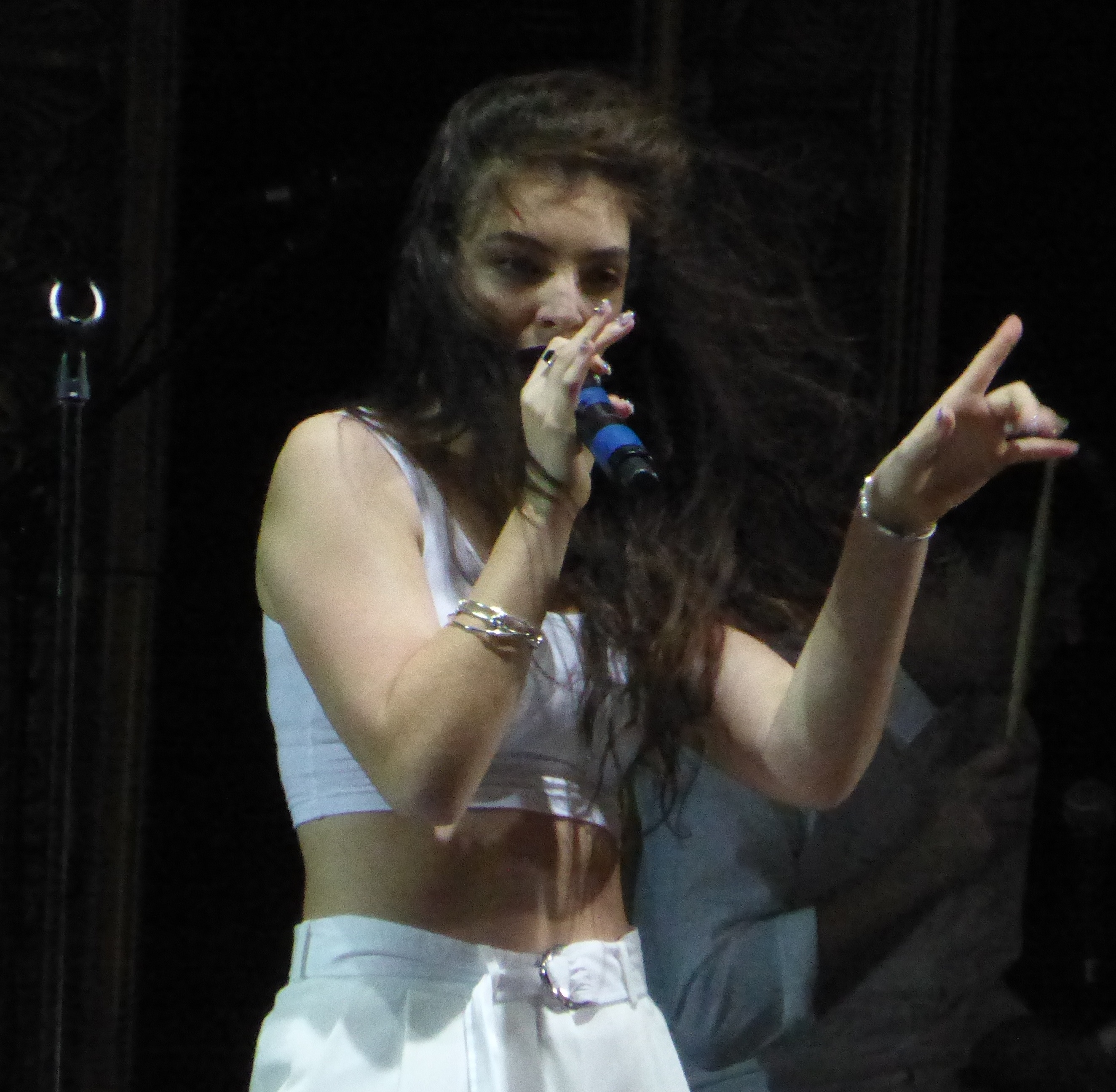
Lorde won two Grammy Awards in 2014, including Song of the Year for Royals, and was one of the most successful New Zealand artists of the decade.

=== Electropop ===
Electropop in Australia had been dominated by the use of synthesizers and Auto-Tune, which became popular because of newcomers, like Havana Brown, Elen Levon, Timomatic, and Justice Crew, as well as 2000s players, such as Brian McFadden, Zoe Badwi, Natalie Bassingthwaighte, Sneaky Sound System, and The Potbelleez. The most successful songs of this subgenre have been Brown's "We Run the Night", Timomatic's "Set It Off", Justice Crew's "Friday to Sunday", McFadden's "Just Say So", and Badwi's "Freefallin".Zane Lowe rose to fame as a DJ and Apple Music creative director.

=== Contemporary R&B ===
Contemporary R&B in Australia was not as widespread in the early 2010s as it was in the 2000s; however, artists, including Guy Sebastian, Jessica Mauboy, and Stan Walker, continued to produce music that was commercially successful. During 2010, Sebastian's single, "Who's That Girl", featuring American rapper Eve, reached number 1 on the ARIA Singles Chart and became his fifth number 1 single in Australia. This made him the only Australian male instrumentalist in Australian music history to achieve five number 1 singles. Mauboy had released many commercially successful top 20 singles, like "Saturday Night" featuring American rapper Ludacris, "What Happened to Us" featuring English musician Jay Sean, and "Galaxy" with Walker, all of which have been certified platinum. In August 2010, Walker's second album entitled From the Inside Out was released; it debuted at number 2 on the ARIA Albums chart.

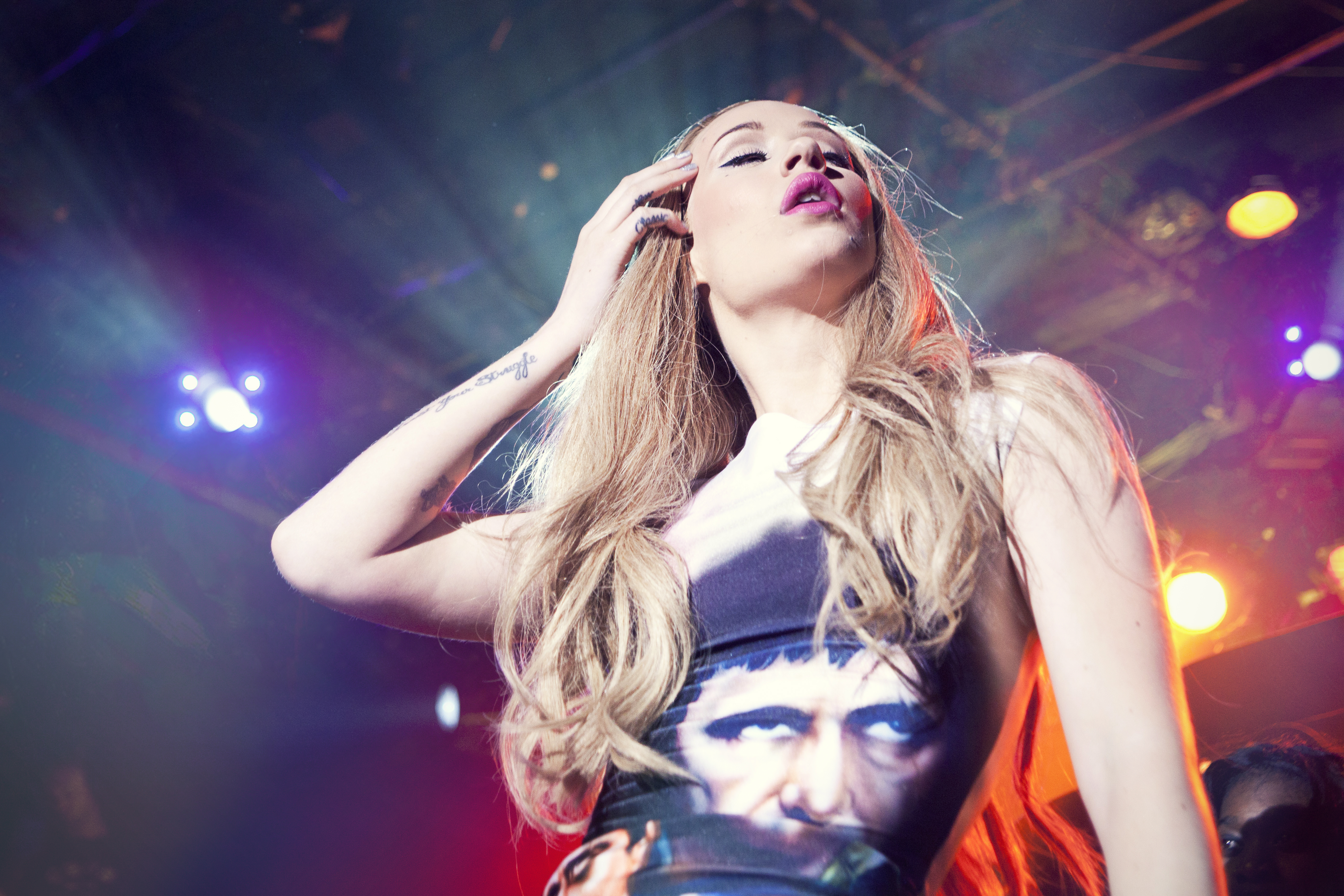
Australian rapper Iggy Azalea

=== Hardstyle ===
Hardstyle had become more mainstream in Australia, with events, such as "Defqon 1", HSU, Powerhouse Events & "IQON", by Q-dance. Australian hardstyle players have been Code Black, Toneshifterz, Audiofreq, Kamikaze, Outbreak, and Rebourne.

=== Future garage and Australian sound ===
This fluid and not completely defined subgenre emerged in 2009. Artists embracing it were Flume, Hayden James, Ta-ku, Chet Faker, and Emoh Instead.

=== Metalcore and hardcore punk ===
Following the success of Australian metalcore band Parkway Drive in the late 2000s and early 2010s, band's such as Northlane were formed and were successful in the early 2010s despite the global decline in the popularity of metalcore. In the mid-and-late 2010s Australia saw an increase in Metalcore and Hardcore Punk bands as part of the hardcore revival, with new young bands such as Polaris, Thornhill, and Alpha Wolf coming onto the scene. The lyrical themes in Australian metalcore often include topics such as social justice and eco-socialism. Australian metalcore regularly incorporates aspects of EDM or Dubstep. Australia's metalcore scene is supported by the public access radio station triple-J, a trend that is not seen in most other scenes, as well as Australia's yearly Hard Rock festival unify gathering.

=== Neo-psychedelia ===
Tame Impala a band originating in Perth, led by Kevin Parker, achieved recognition in the music industry. They won the 2025 Grammy Award for Best Dance/Electronic Recording with "Neverender", a collaboration with Justice. In Australia, they secured 13 ARIA Awards, including Album of the Year for Lonerism (2013) and Currents (2015), and Best Rock Album for both. Internationally, they received the BRIT Award for International Group in 2016. Their albums have topped charts in Australia, the UK, and the US. Several artists have been influenced by Tame Impala, including Tyler, the Creator, Kanye West, Kendrick Lamar, and Rihanna. Other artists who have cited Tame Impala as an influence or been recognized for similarities in their sound include King Gizzard and the Lizard Wizard, MGMT, Arctic Monkeys and Babe Rainbow.

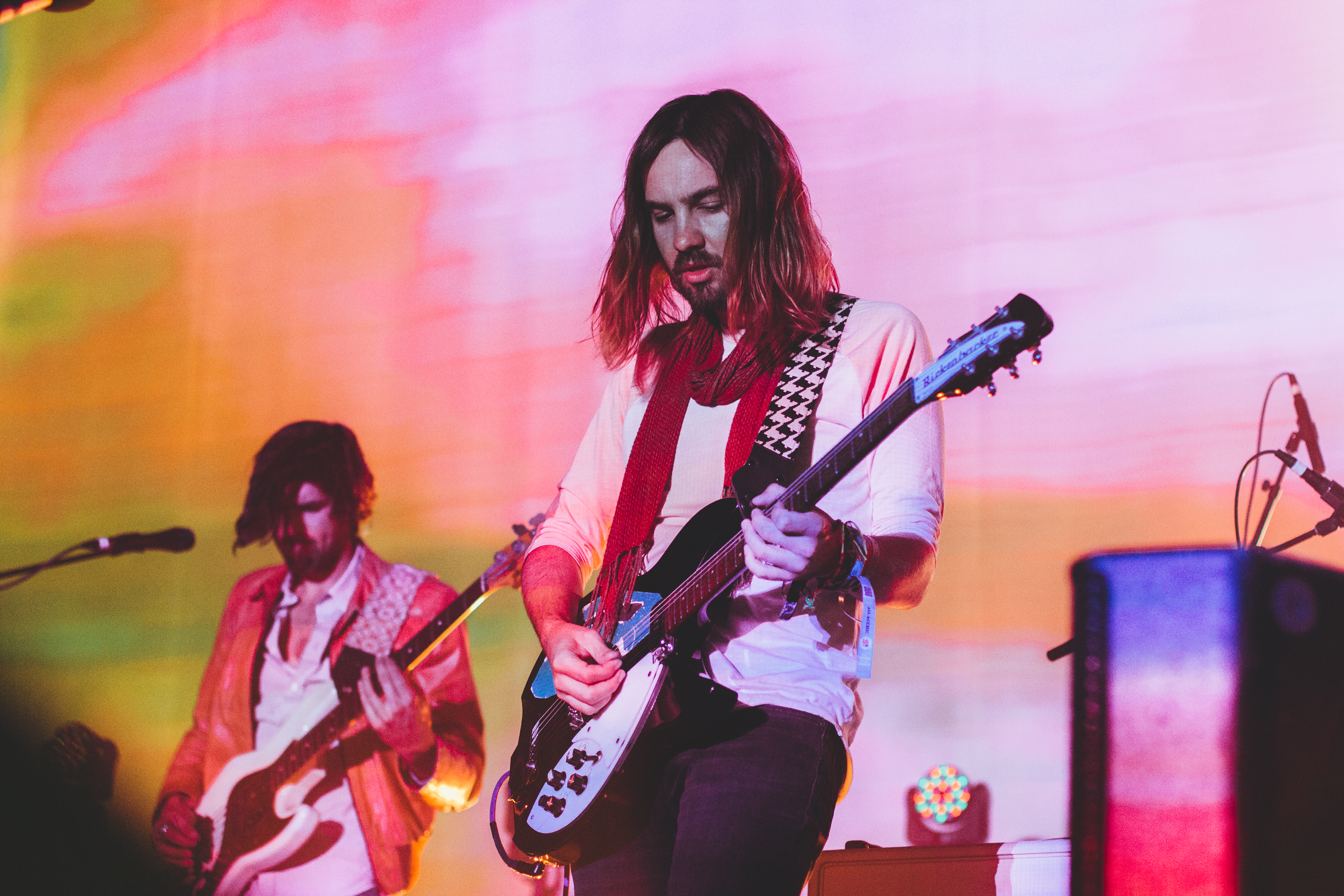
Tame Impala Australian Psychedelic Rock Band

== Latin America and Caribbean ==
=== Pop and reggaeton ===
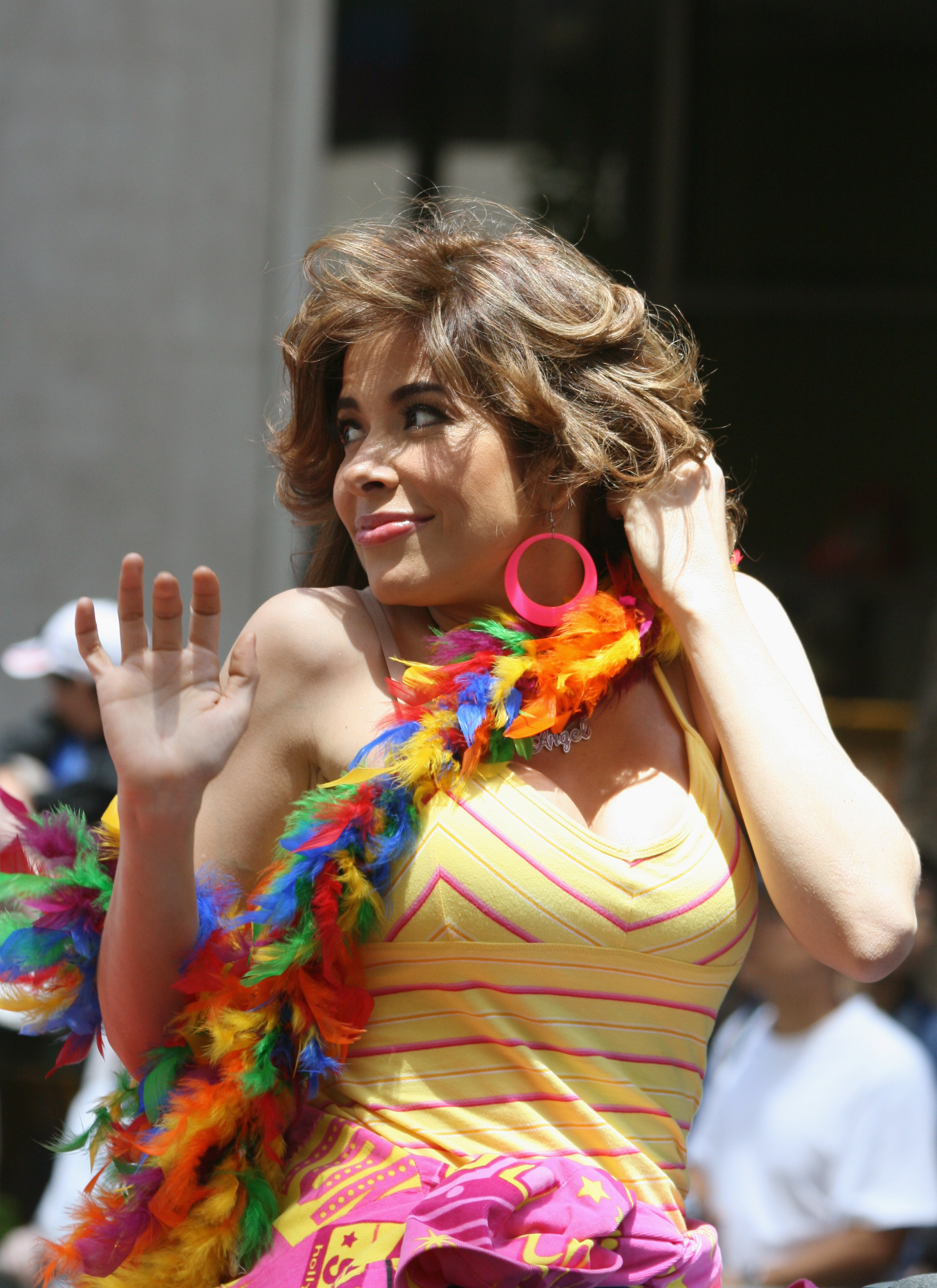
In 2017 Gloria Trevi collaborated with fellow Mexican artist Alejandra Guzmán for the album Versus.

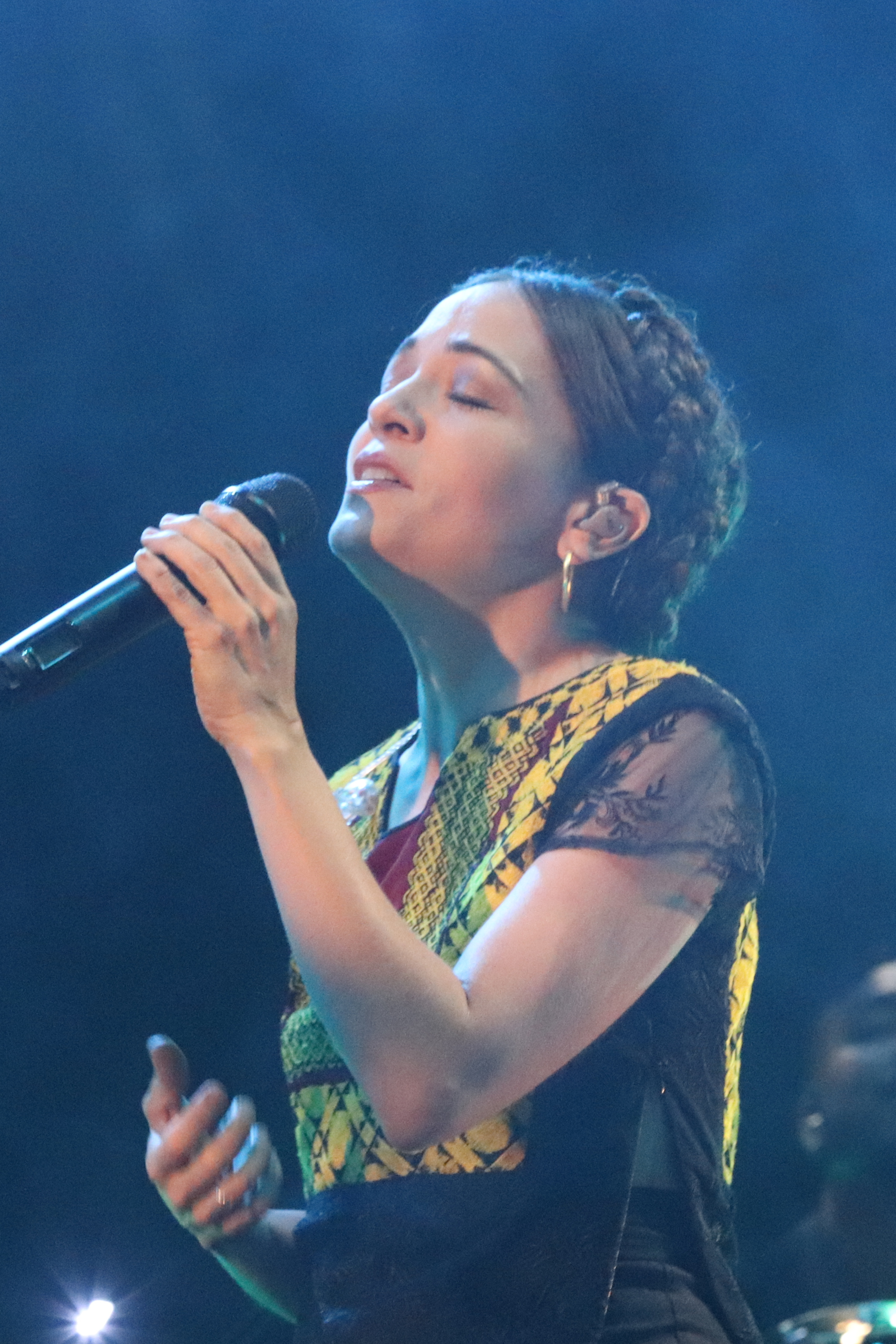
Natalia Lafourcade

In Latin America, pop, pop rock, El Pasito Duranguense, and tropical were still mainstream through the early 2010s. A new electro subgenre emerged from reggaeton, and it became popular during late 2010. This is because of electronic and dance being widespread in the prominent markets of the world. Pitbull has been the principal representative of this subgenre. Bachata – which became mainstream in the past decade – has garnered more popularity thanks to remakes of classic songs, including "Stand by Me" by Prince Royce and "Will You Still Love Me Tomorrow" by Leslie Grace. In addition, acts, like Royce, as well as former Aventura lead singer Romeo Santos, had crossed over different markets with bachata, such as with Enrique Iglesias' song Loco, which features Santos. Royce and Santos had the best selling Latin albums of 2011 and 2012, respectively, in the United States with their debut albums-Prince Royce and Formula, Vol. 1. Salsa However, it declined later in the early 2010s although Marc Anthony made an international hit with his salsa song "Vivir Mi Vida".

In 2017 the Luis Fonsi song featuring Daddy Yankee, "Despacito" was a hit, topping the charts of 47 countries and tying for the longest-reigning number-one single Billboard's history. Since her debut in 2003, Natalia Lafourcade has been one of the most successful singers in the pop rock scene in Latin America. Foreign pop artists have had success in Mexico. In May 2013, Christina Aguilera appeared on Mexican singer Alejandro Fernández's cover of "Hoy Tengo Ganas de Ti" from his album Confidencias. On September 24, 2015 Mexican singer-songwriter Carla Morrison becomes the first female soloist in 22 weeks to enter the top 10 of Billboard Latin Digital Songs chart. "Hasta la Raíz" by Natalia Lafourcade wins Song of the Year and Record of the Year at the 16th Annual Latin Grammy Awards. ¡México Por Siempre! by Mexican singer Luis Miguel wins Best Regional Mexican Music Album at the 61st Annual Grammy Awards. "Me Niego" by Reik featuring Ozuna and Wisin wins Song of the Year and Collaboration of the Year at the Premio Lo Nuestro 2019. "Mi Persona Favorita" by Alejandro Sanz and Camila Cabello wins Record of the Year at the 20th Annual Latin Grammy Awards. Los Ángeles Azules featuring Natalia Lafourcade song "Nunca Es Suficiente" was the 10 Most-streamed songs for Latin music in the United States in 2019.

In addition to Enrique Iglesias having a successful decade with his albums 'Euphoria' and 'Sex And Love', Latin veteran Ricky Martin enjoyed massive popularity with his albums 'Musica + Alma + Sexo' and 'A Quién Quiera Escuchar' and non-album singles 'Vida', 'Mr. Put It Down' featuring Pitbull, 'Vente Pa'Ca' featuring Maluma, 'Fiebre' featuring Wisin & Yandel, as well as 'Cantalo' featuring Residente and Bad Bunny which is the lead single of his 2020 EP 'Pausa'.

=== Hip-hop ===
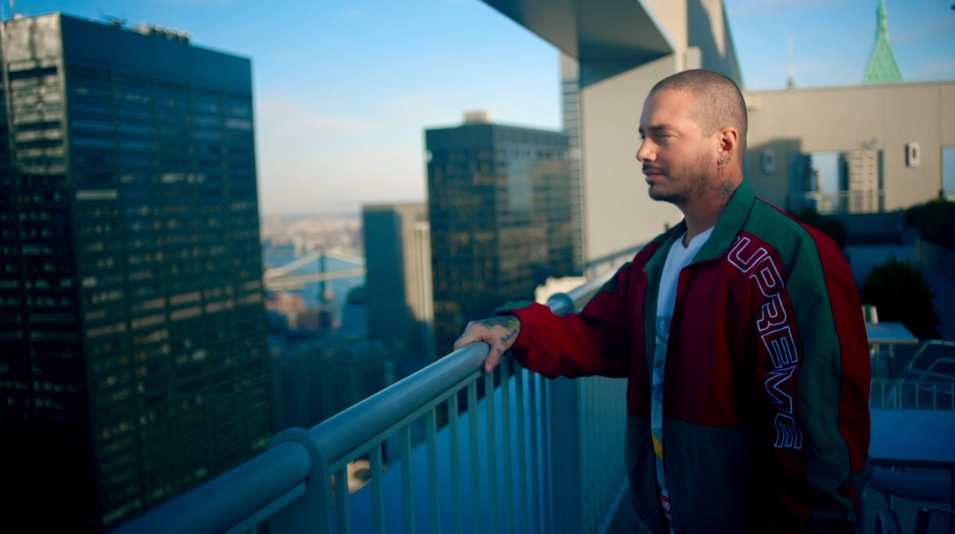
J Balvin in 2018

US rapper Nicki Minaj became extremely popular during the early 2010s. Minaj's debut studio album, Pink Friday (2010) peaked at number 1 on the Billboard 200 a month after its release, selling 375,000 copies in its first week. This marked the second highest sales week for a female hip-hop recording artist, behind Lauryn Hill's The Miseducation of Lauryn Hill in 1998, which sold 422,624 copies in its first week. She became the first female solo artist to have seven singles on the Billboard Hot 100 at the same time. Her seventh single, "Super Bass", has been certified Diamond by the RIAA, becoming one of the best selling singles in the United States. Minaj's second studio album, Pink Friday: Roman Reloaded (2012,) topped charts internationally, also spawning the top 10 singles "Starships" and "Pound the Alarm". The album became one of the best selling albums of 2012, according to Nielsen SoundScan, selling 1 million copies worldwide, as well as "Starships" becoming one of the best selling singles of that year. She was the first female artist included on MTV's Annual Hottest MC List, with The New York Times suggesting that some consider her "the most influential female rapper of all time."

== Asia ==
=== K-pop ===
During the early 2010s, the K-pop genre began to noticeably increase its popularity outside Asia, spreading into Eastern Europe, Latin America, the Middle East, and the West at an exponential rate compared to the previous decade. The Internet served a dominant role in K-pop's rise in popularity, establishing diverse fan communities online, likening it to a netizen sub-culture.

In Southeast Asia, K-pop continued to increase its presence in the lexicon of Asia's popular culture, being known as part of a wider brand of exported Korean Entertainment named Hallyu. Outside Asia, social media and video sharing sites such as YouTube, Facebook, Tumblr, Reddit and Twitter had a significant influence in promulgating awareness of Korean pop to new western audiences. Shareable, high-production value music videos, eye-catching fashion and slick choreographies paired with music influenced by western pop trends helped establish K-pop as an intriguing online spectacle. The genre proved it could convert viral success into commercial success in 2012, when Psy's "Gangnam Style" became a breakout viral hit topping the music charts of more than 30 countries including Australia, Canada, France, Germany, Italy, Russia, Spain, and the United Kingdom as well as No.2 in the United States.

Globalisation had afforded K-pop groups continued expansion into the Western markets, most notably the United States, through tours, online downloads and streaming services like Spotify and Apple Music, who added more K-pop to their libraries in response to increased demand from K-fans. Korean girl group 2NE1 and boy groups Exo and BTS all charted within the top half of the Billboard 200 albums chart with Korean-language albums in the 2010s, while BTS and Korean girl group Blackpink additionally entered the US Billboard Hot 100 songs chart. These songs, although recorded in Korean, incorporated English-language phrases and slang terms into their lyrics and used popular western music trends of the time such as hip-hop, R&B, EDM, tropical house, deep house and trap music to their benefit. Similar to the bubblegum pop groups of the 1990s, K-pop occupies a predominantly youth demographic despite the language barrier. Leading K-pop acts were Girls' Generation, 2NE1, Big Bang, Super Junior, Psy, Exo, BTS, Blackpink, Twice, and Red Velvet. Despite advancements in the visibility of the genre, K-pop was yet to fully establish and solidify a Korean "East-to-West" crossover act within the global music industry, this being the dream goal of many Korean entertainment companies.

Domestically, young Korean Indie acts K-Indie as well as Korean Urban contemporary acts rose to higher prominence than ever before. The influence of North American pop and hip-hop culture remained visible through young Korean artists as K-Hip-hop and K-R&B emerged from the underground and discovered newfound commercial viability on Korea TV and Radio as well as domestic music streaming services.

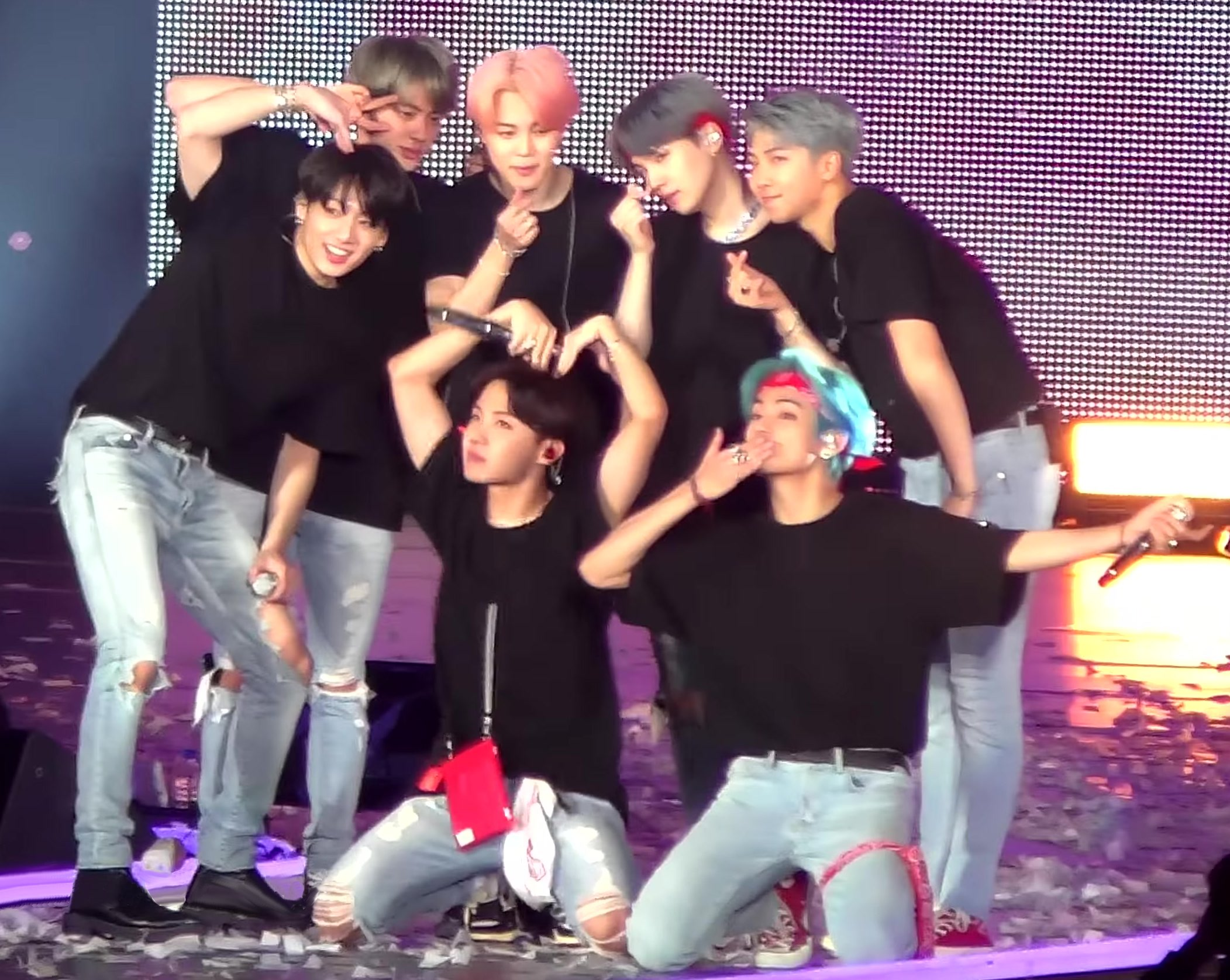
In the 2010s, the K-pop group BTS broke numerous records in South Korea and the rest of the world, with the hit songs "DNA", "Fake Love", and "Idol", and obtaining an immense fanbase globally.

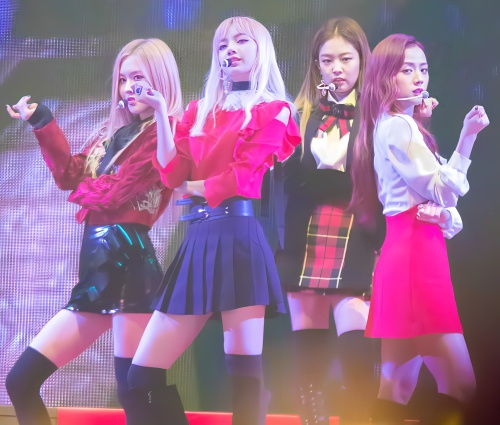
Korean girl group Blackpink broke numerous online records in the late 2010s and was dubbed the "biggest girl group in the world".

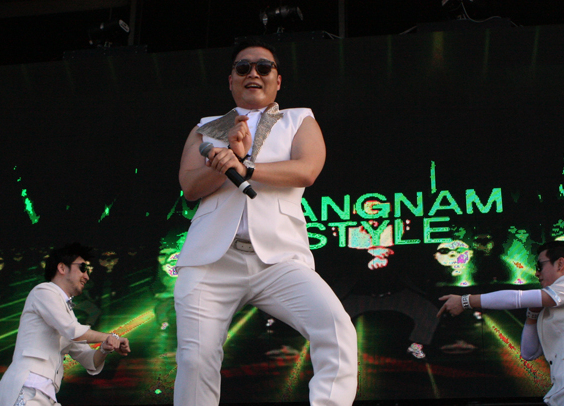
K-Pop experienced rapid growth in popularity during the decade, particularly following the international success of Psy's hit single "Gangnam Style". The song's music video became the first YouTube video to surpass one billion views.

=== J-pop ===
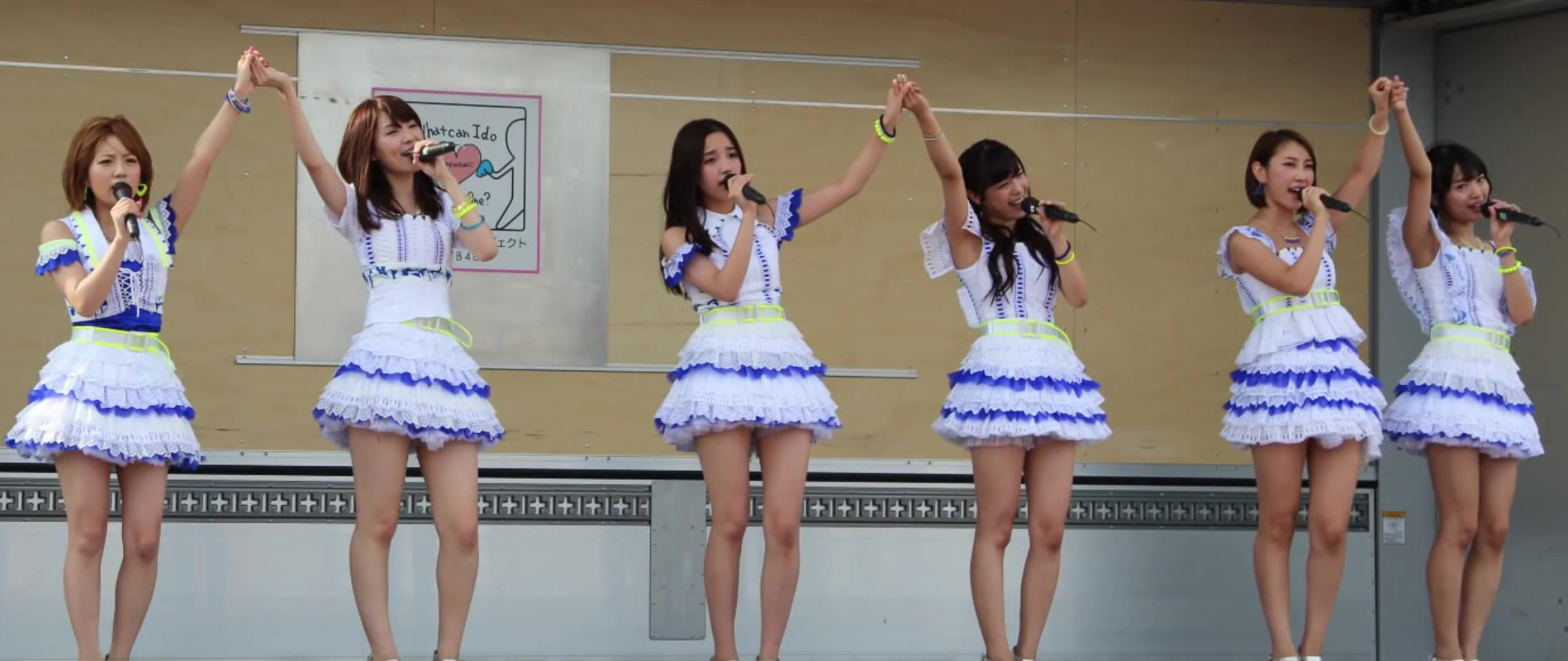
The Japanese group AKB48 is one of the most successful J-pop artists.

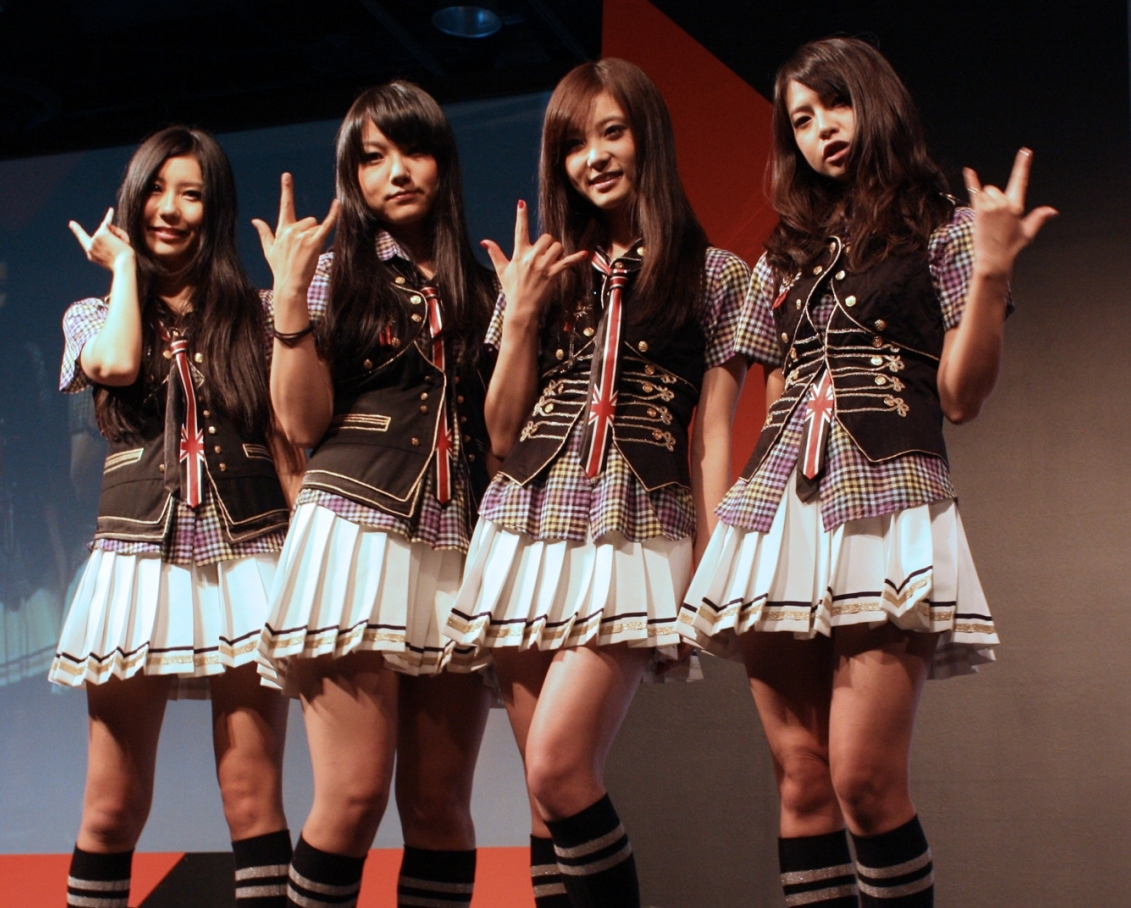
Scandal at Anime Festival Asia 2010 in Singapore

During 2010, the prominent Japanese female idol group AKB48 received a Guinness World Record for being the world's "largest pop group".

In 2010, the Japanese boy band, Arashi, released their 1 million selling album Boku no Miteiru Fūkei, which was named the best selling album of the year in Japan.

=== C-pop ===
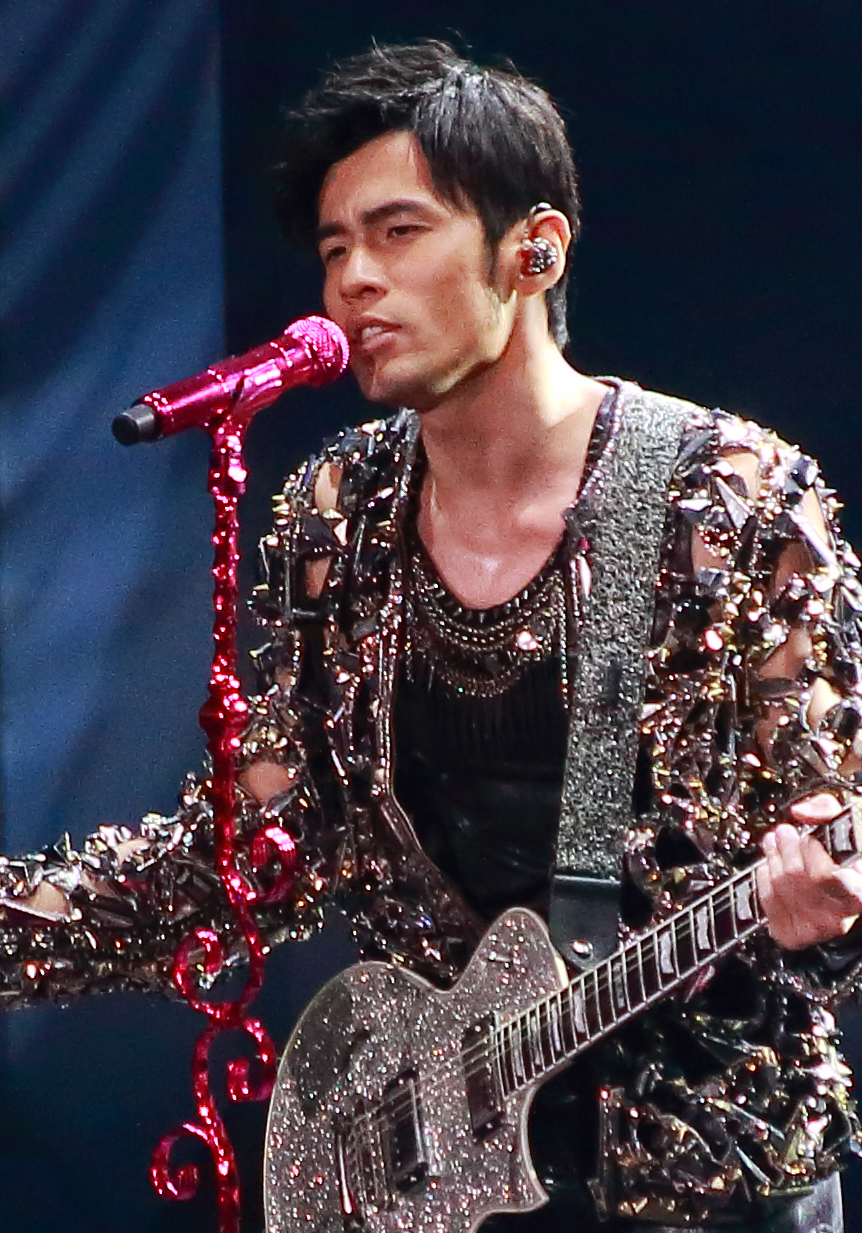
Jay Chou in 2013

Indie pop and rock music continued to have a dominant effect on radio stations in Taiwan and Hong Kong. Jay Chou was still the dominant force in Asian popular music, with his new album The Era nominated for six Golden Melody Awards (of which it won three) and its lead single "Superman Can't Fly" hitting number two on the Hit FM charts that year.

In 2013, the three-member boy band TFBoys was established. They were known for their bubblegum-style music and choreography, such as that seen in the music video of their signature song, "Manual of Youth". S.H.E member Hebe Tien had her first solo hit with "A Little Happiness", which became the theme song of Taiwanese movie Our Times in 2015.

While in Hong Kong and Taiwan pop music and pop-rock music were dominant, straight-ahead jazz, jazz fusion, and classical music continued to be the most popular genres among young Singaporean musicians, especially bands. The youthful Orchestra of the Music Makers, which took its name from a line from the poem by Arthur O'Shaughnessy, was the most popular youth orchestra in the region in the first half of the decade, and released their first solo album of works by Gustav Mahler in 2013.

=== Hip-hop ===
Rapper Shigga Shay was one of the most successful rapper in Southeast Asia, scoring a hit with his rap remake of an old Malay folk song.

== Africa ==
=== Electropop and rock ===
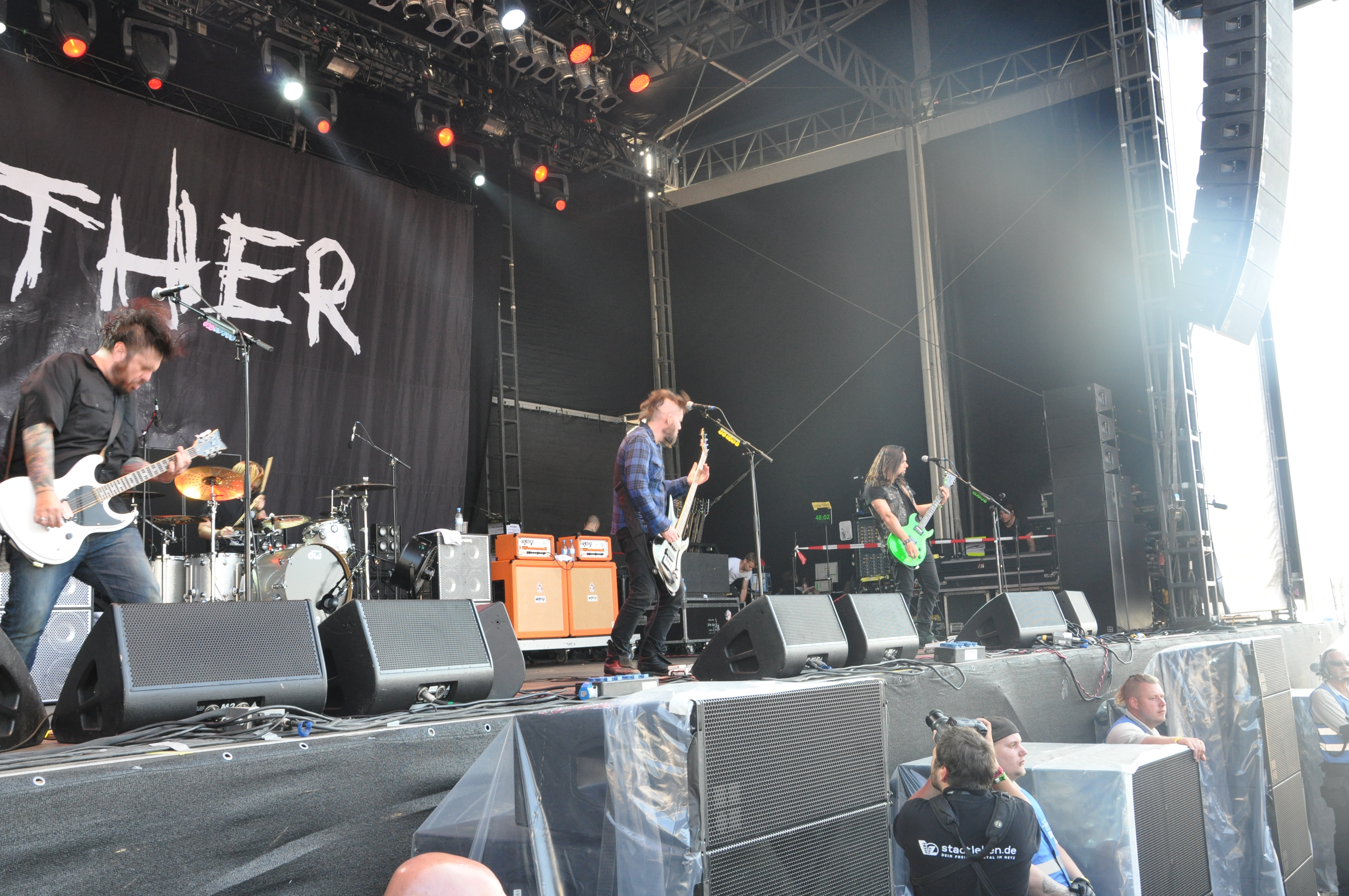
Seether performing at Rock am Ring 2014

By the late 2000s and early 2010s, South Africa began a great phase of high music experimentation of genres previously not very prominent in the country while maintaining its rooted music. The chart success of the 2010 FIFA World Cup song Waka Waka (This Time for Africa) made by Shakira, which featured South African band Freshlyground-resulted in one of the country's first major chart topping hits by their own artist, launching a great amount of inspiration to other local instrumentalists. Following the success, Die Antwoord became one of the first acts of the country to obtain three albums that charted in the top 150 of the Billboard 200, marking new highs for the country's music industry. One of the band's singles, "Enter The Ninja", also obtained top 50 positions in the United Kingdom and Australia.

=== Rap ===
Rapper AKA also received a high amount of recognition by 2013, becoming famous for local chart topping hits, including "Congratulate" and "All Eyes On Me". The country introduced its first official, internationally recognized music chart Mediaguide, later renamed Entertainment Monitoring Africa. The chart currently relies on airplay for its charting positions, as opposed to others that also count physical purchases, downloads, and streams. South African rapper Emtee kept working on his music throughout his late teen years. He released his hit single "Roll Up" which had gained critical success. In 2010, Emtee collaborated with South African rapper Maraza on a song titled "In It To Win It". They appeared on Channel O's show HeadRush. In 2016, he won best rap album at the 22nd South African Music Awards. Emtee had collaborated with AKA, Wizkid, Nasty C, Fifi, Cooper, A-Reece, and B3nchMArQ.

=== Afrobeats ===
As the decade continued the rise of Afrobeats, it had its roots in Ghana and Nigeria and the genre became more recognizable outside Africa. Such acts like Wizkid and Davido had gained major success. Wizkid had won artist of the year at the MTV Africa Music Awards in 2016 and was involved with the writing production of Drake's "One Dance". By June 2016, he had received a total of 34 awards from 106 nominations. He was also the recipient of a BET Award, two MOBO Award, five The Headies Awards, two Channel O Music Video Awards, six Nigeria Entertainment Awards, two Ghana Music Awards, two Dynamix All Youth Awards, two City People Entertainment Awards, and a Future Award. In addition, he had been nominated three times at the MTV Europe Music Awards as well as four times at the World Music Awards. Davido was the recipient of a BET Award, a Kora Award, a Channel O Music Video Award, a Ghana Music Award, a Nigeria Music Video Award, 2 MTV Africa Music Awards, 2 African Muzik Magazine Awards, 5 The Headies Awards, 7 Nigeria Entertainment Awards and 2 Dynamix All Youth Awards. Together, they are some of the best selling artists in Nigeria.

In recent years, the music industry had progress in Ghana. Ghana had many contemporary styles of music due to the geographical scale in Africa but these evolved into a much more contemporary style. Competition amongst the number of artists in Ghanaian music had emerged. One of these styles is known as the 'azonto'. Rapper Guru had produced a number of hits, including "lapaz Toyota".

== See also ==
- 2010s in the music industry
- 2000s in music
- Dance music
- List of Hot 100 number-one singles of the 2010s (U.S.)
- List of UK Singles Chart number ones of the 2010s
- Synthwave
