= Professor Green discography =

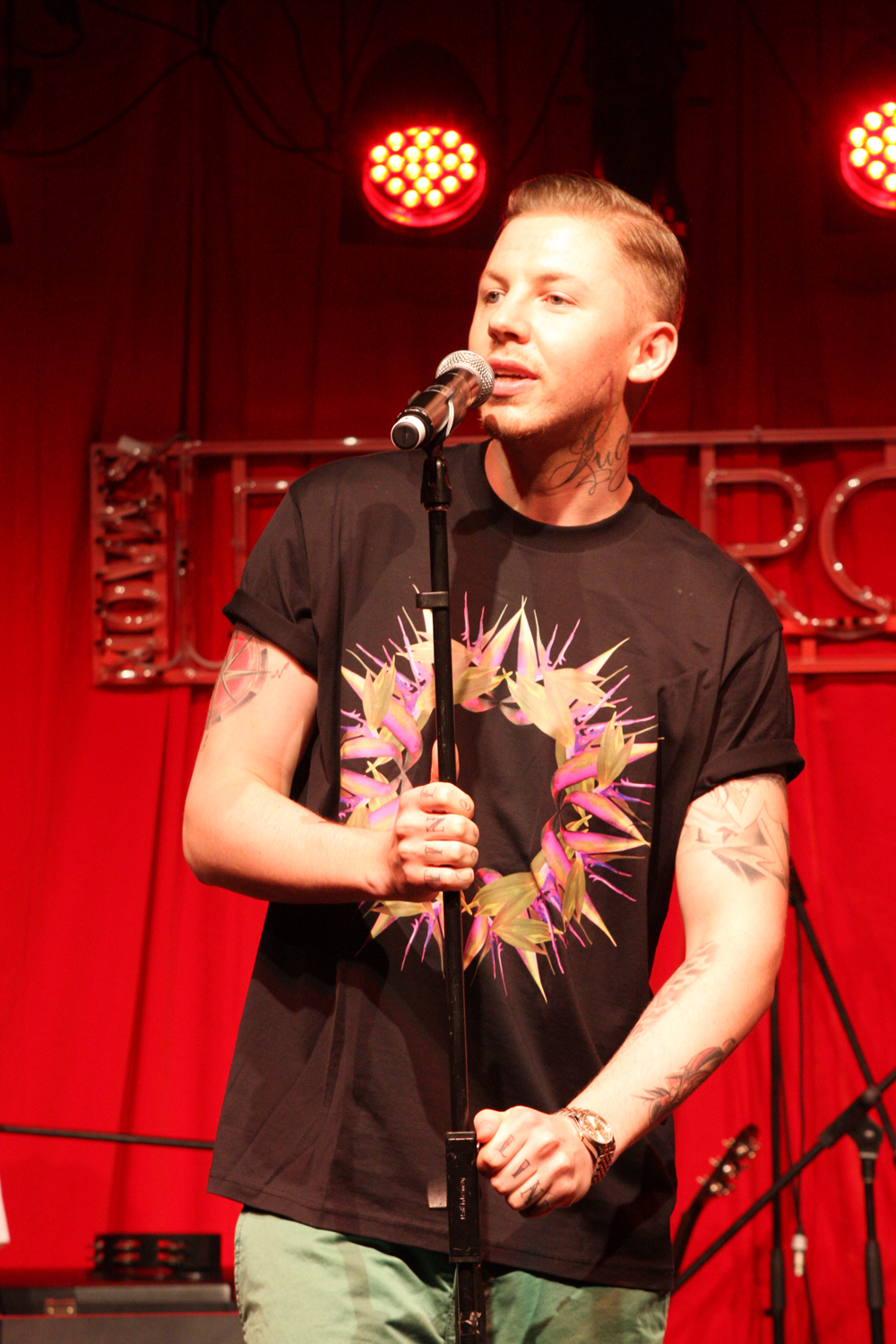
- Professor Green in March 2012
- Studio albums: 3
- Extended plays: 3
- Singles: 25
- Music videos: 31
- Mixtapes: 1

The discography of British rapper Professor Green consists of three studio albums, three extended plays, twenty-five singles and thirty-one music videos.

Professor Green released his first extended play, The Green EP, in November 2008 independently. The first single, "I Need You Tonight", debuted at number three on the UK Singles Chart and number fifteen in Ireland in April 2010. The EP's second single, the Lily Allen collaboration, "Just Be Good to Green", reached number five in the UK, number seventeen in Ireland and also charting in Australia and New Zealand. His studio album, Alive Till I'm Dead (sic) was released in July 2010 in the United Kingdom and it debuted at number two and was certified as Gold by the British Phonographic Industry (BPI). The album also contained the singles, "Monster", featuring Example, and "Jungle" featuring Maverick Sabre, which peaked at number twenty-nine and thirty-one in the UK respectively.

The rapper's second studio album, At Your Inconvenience was released in October 2011; where it debuted at number three on the UK chart. It was preceded by the release of "Read All About It", which—featuring Emeli Sandé—went on to become the artist's first number-one single. The track also marked Green's first international certification award, with the Australian Recording Industry Association certifying it as platinum. A further three singles were released from the album throughout 2012: "Never Be a Right Time", "Remedy"—featuring Ruth-Anne— and "Avalon"—featuring Sierra Kusterbeck— peaking at number thirty-five, number eighteen and number twenty-nine in the United Kingdom respectively.

Growing Up in Public was released as Green's third studio album on 22 September 2014.

Professor Green has also appeared as a featured artist on several occasions, including on Tinchy Stryder's album track "Game Over", which also featuring Example, Tinie Tempah, Giggs, Devlin and Chipmunk debuted at number twenty-two in the UK. In June 2011, Green also appeared alongside collaborator Maverick Sabre on project True Tiger's single "In the Air"; which peaked at number fifty-two.

== Albums ==
=== Studio albums ===
List of albums, with selected chart positions and certifications
Title	Details	Peak chart positions					Certifications
Title	Details	UK	UK R&B	AUS	IRE	SCO	Certifications
Alive Till I'm Dead	Released: 19 July 2010; Label: Virgin; Formats: CD, digital download	2	2	98	18	5	UK: Platinum
At Your Inconvenience	Released: 28 October 2011; Label: Virgin; Formats: CD, digital download	3	1	—	13	5	UK: Gold
Growing Up in Public	Released: 22 September 2014; Label: Virgin; Formats: CD, digital download	12	1	—	63	17	

=== Mixtapes ===
Title	Details
Lecture 1	Released: 18 March 2006; Label: Independent; Formats: CD, Digital download

== Extended plays ==
Title	Details	Peak chart positions
Title	Details	UK
The Green EP	Released: 5 November 2008; Label: Independent; Formats: CD, digital download	—
M.O.T.H	Released: 6 September 2019; Label: Gang Green Records; Formats: CD, digital download, streaming	57
Pop Shxt	Released: 29 September 2023; Label: Cooking Vinyl Limited; Formats: CD, digital download, streaming	—

== Singles ==
=== As lead artist ===
List of singles, with selected chart positions and certifications
Title	Year	Peak chart positions										Certifications	Album
Title	Year	UK	UK R&B	AUS	BEL (Fla)	GER	IRE	NLD	NZ	SCO	SWI	Certifications	Album
"I Need You Tonight" (featuring Ed Drewett)	2010	3	2	—	—	—	15	—	—	4	—	UK: Gold	Alive Till I'm Dead
"Just Be Good to Green" (featuring Lily Allen)	2010	5	3	49	—	—	17	95	32	6	—	UK: Gold	Alive Till I'm Dead
"Monster" (featuring Example)	2010	29	13	—	—	—	—	—	—	36	—	UK: Silver	Alive Till I'm Dead
"Jungle" (featuring Maverick Sabre)	2011	31	9	—	—	—	—	—	—	—	—	UK: Gold	Alive Till I'm Dead
"Read All About It" (featuring Emeli Sandé or Dolcenera)	2011	1	1	34	21	80	2	27	63	1	58	UK: Platinum; AUS: Platinum; ITA: Gold	At Your Inconvenience
"Never Be a Right Time" (featuring Ed Drewett)	2012	35	11	—	—	—	49	—	—	40	—		At Your Inconvenience
"Remedy" (featuring Ruth Anne)	2012	18	7	—	—	—	26	—	—	30	—	UK: Silver	At Your Inconvenience
"Avalon" (featuring Sierra Kusterbeck)	2012	29	6	—	—	—	95	—	—	31	—		At Your Inconvenience
"Lullaby" (featuring Tori Kelly)	2014	4	1	—	—	—	58	—	—	4	—	UK: Gold	Growing Up in Public
"Little Secrets" (featuring Mr. Probz)	2014	83	8	—	—	—	—	—	—	—	—		Growing Up in Public
"Active" (featuring Dream McLean)	2017	—	—	—	—	—	—	—	—	—	—		Non-album singles
"Unruly" (with Fekky & Diztortion)	2018	—	—	—	—	—	—	—	—	—	—		Non-album singles
"Mercedes Riddim" (featuring Dutch)	2018	—	—	—	—	—	—	—	—	—	—		Non-album singles
"Count on You" (featuring Greatness Jones & JSTJCK)	2018	—	—	—	—	—	—	—	—	—	—		Non-album singles
"Photographs" (featuring Rag'n'Bone Man)	2018	79	—	—	89	—	—	—	—	32	—		Non-album singles
"Got It All" (featuring Alice Chater)	2019	48	—	—	—	—	—	—	—	22	—	UK: Silver	M.O.T.H EP
"Round and Round" (featuring Example)	2020	—	—	—	—	—	—	—	—	—	—		Non-album singles
"Dance Like a Tory"	2022	—	—	—	—	—	—	—	—	—	—		Non-album singles
"Pop Shxt" (featuring K Koke)	2023	—	—	—	—	—	—	—	—	—	—		Pop Shxt EP
"Do Ya" (featuring InfamousIzak and Poté)	2023	—	—	—	—	—	—	—	—	—	—		Pop Shxt EP
"Nothing Before It's Time" (featuring Fifth)	2023	—	—	—	—	—	—	—	—	—	—		Pop Shxt EP
"Nervous" (featuring K Koke and R.A.)	2023	—	—	—	—	—	—	—	—	—	—		Pop Shxt EP
"Happy" (featuring Zdot)	2025	—	—	—	—	—	—	—	—	—	—		TBA
"45" (featuring Zdot)	2025	—	—	—	—	—	—	—	—	—	—		TBA
"On My Way" (featuring Zdot and Kara Marni)	2025	—	—	—	—	—	—	—	—	—	—		TBA
"Another Life" (featuring Zdot)	2025	—	—	—	—	—	—	—	—	—	—		TBA
"Need U Now" (with Sigma and Dutch & Graft)	2026	—	—	—	—	—	—	—	—	—	—		TBA
"–" denotes single that did not chart or was not released in that territory.

=== As featured artist ===
List of singles, with selected chart positions and certifications
Title	Year	Peak chart positions			Album
Title	Year	UK	UK R&B	SCO	Album
"Game Over" (Tinchy Stryder featuring Professor Green, Example, Giggs, Devlin, Tinie Tempah and Chipmunk)	2010	22	—	28	Third Strike
"In the Air" (True Tiger featuring Professor Green and Maverick Sabre)	2011	52	—	—	Non-album singles
"Top of the World" (Smiler featuring Professor Green and Tawiah)	2012	63	15	—	Non-album singles
"Stylechanger" (Eric Turner featuring Professor Green, Kardinal Offishall and Wretch 32)	2012	—	—	—	Non-album singles
"Dreamers" (Epic Remix) (Rizzle Kicks featuring Pharoahe Monch, Hines, Professor Green, Ed Sheeran, Dappy, Foreign Beggars and Chali 2na)	2012	105	18	—	Stereo Typical
"Fire Blaze" (Rascals featuring Professor Green)	2013	165	—	—	Non-album single
"–" denotes single that did not chart or was not released.

=== Promotional singles ===
List of singles, with selected chart positions and certifications
Title	Year	Peak chart positions			Album
Title	Year	UK	UK R&B	SCO	Album
"At Your Inconvenience"	2011	96	25	—	At Your Inconvenience
"How Many Moons (Remix)" (featuring Dream Mclean and Rinse)	2012	—	—	—	At Your Inconvenience
"D.P.M.O."	2012	—	—	—	At Your Inconvenience
"Are You Getting Enough?" (featuring Miles Kane)	2013	93	12	—	Growing Up in Public
"Not Your Man" (featuring Thabo)	2014	168	28	—	Growing Up in Public
"I Need Church"	2014	124	46	—	Growing Up in Public
"Back on the Market"	2016	130	39	—	Non-album singles
"One Eye on the Door"	2016	—	—	56	Non-album singles
"–" denotes single that did not chart or was not released.

== Guest appearances ==
Title	Year	Album
"When You Wasn't Famous (Professor Green Version)" (The Streets featuring Professor Green)	2006	When You Wasn't Famous CD2
"What I See" (Ny featuring Professor Green)	2007	Split Endz Volume 2
"Either Way (Streets Remix)" (The Twang featuring The Streets & Professor Green)	2007	Love It When I Feel Like This
"Grown Man Sh%t" (Bigz featuring Professor Green & Shalo)	2009	Flight of the Navigator (Swooosh)
"Grown Man Sh%t Pt. 2" (Bigz featuring Professor Green & Jareth)	2011	Quantum Leap
"Forever More" (DJ Fresh featuring The Fray & Professor Green)	2012	Nextlevelism
"Be Like Me (Remix)" (True Tiger featuring Snoop Dogg, P Money and Professor Green)	2012	Eye of the Tiger Vol. 2
"Londoner" (Chip featuring Wretch 32, Professor Green & Loick Essien)	2012	London Boy
"Lifted (Remix)" (Naughty Boy featuring Emeli Sandé and Professor Green)	2013	Hotel Cabana
"German Whip (Remix)" (Meridian Dan featuring Skepta, Professor Green, Bossman Birdie & Rizzle Kicks)	2014	German Whip (Remixes) – EP
"D.W.I.D" (Dream Mclean featuring Professor Green and CASisDEAD)	2014	Greyscale
"Extra Mile" (Example featuring Fekky & Professor Green)	2020	Some Nights Last for Days

== Music videos ==
As lead artist

Title	Year	Artist	Director
"When You Wasn't Famous (Professor Green Remix)"	2006	The Streets	
"Stereotypical Man"	2006	Professor Green	
"Before I Die"	2007	Professor Green	
"Before I Die Remix"	2007	Professor Green	
"Before I Die Remix"	2007		
"Upper Clapton Dance"	2009	Professor Green	Henry Scholfield
"Hard Night Out"	2009	Professor Green	Brick Grody
"I Need You Tonight"	2010	Professor Green (featuring Ed Drewett)	Henry Scholfield
"Just Be Good to Green"	2010	Professor Green (featuring Lily Allen)	Henry Scholfield
"Monster"	2010	Professor Green (featuring Example)	Henry Scholfield
"Coming To Get Me"	2010	Professor Green	
"Game Over"	2010	Tinchy Stryder (featuring Professor Green)	Adam Powell
"Jungle"	2010	Professor Green (featuring Maverick Sabre)	Henry Scholfield
"At Your Inconvenience"	2011	Professor Green	
"Read All About It"	2011	Professor Green (featuring Emeli Sandé)	Henry Scholfield
"Never Be a Right Time"	2011	Professor Green (featuring Ed Drewett)	
"Remedy"	2012	Professor Green (featuring Ruth-Anne)	
"Avalon"	2012	Professor Green (featuring Sierra Kusterbeck)	Ross Cairns
"Are You Getting Enough?"	2013	Professor Green (featuring Miles Kane)	Henry Scholfield
"Not Your Man"	2014	Professor Green (featuring Thabo)	Simon Emmett
"Lullaby"	2014	Professor Green (featuring Tori Kelly)	Alex Herron
"Little Secrets"	2014	Professor Green (featuring Mr. Probz)	Alex Herron
"One Eye on the Door"	2016	Professor Green	Henry Schofield
"Back on the Market"	2016	Professor Green	Alex Herron
"Count on You"	2018	Professor Green (featuring Greatness Jones & JSTJCK)	Simon Emmett
"Photographs"	2018	Professor Green (featuring Rag'n'Bone Man)	Simon Emmett
"Got It All"	2019	Professor Green (featuring Alice Chatter)	Rankin
"Bad Decisions"	2020	Professor Green (featuring Nahli)	Saoud Khalaf
"Dance Like A Tory"	2022	Professor Green	
"Pop Shxt"	2023	Professor Green (featuring K Koke)	Josh McCartney
"Do Ya"	2023	Professor Green (featuring INFAMOUSIZAK and Poté)	Josh McCartney
"Nothing Before It's Time"	2023	Professor Green (featuring Fifth)	Josh McCartney
"Nervous"	2023	Professor Green (featuring K Koke and R.A.)	Josh McCartney
"Happy"	2025	Professor Green (featuring Zdot)	William Howe and Kasey-Anais Blondell
