= Growing Up in Public (Professor Green album) =

Studio album by Professor Green
- Released: 19 September 2014
- Recorded: April 2012 – June 2014
- Genre: British hip-hop; grime
- Length: 37:15
- Label: Virgin
- Producer: Alex "Cores" Hayes; Chris Loco; Felix Joseph; Kid Harpoon; Mojam; The Futuristics; The New Royales; TMS; Yogi

Professor Green chronology
At Your Inconvenience (2011)	Growing Up in Public (2014)	M.O.T.H (2019)

Singles from Growing Up in Public
- 1. "Lullaby" Released: 14 September 2014; 2. "Little Secrets" Released: 7 December 2014

Growing Up in Public is the third studio album by British rapper Professor Green. It was released on 19 September 2014 through Virgin Records. The album features appearances from the likes of Tori Kelly, Example, Mr Probz, Rizzle Kicks and James Craise among others. The album continues the themes covered on his second studio album, At Your Inconvenience (2011).

The album's first promotional single, "Not Your Man", was released as an "instant grat" through the iTunes Store on 7 July 2014. The album's second promotional single, "I Need Church", was released as an "instant grat" on 16 July. The album's lead single, "Lullaby", featuring singer-songwriter Tori Kelly, was released on 14 September 2014. The song received its radio debut on BBC Radio 1 on 28 July 2014, but was premiered at the Leicester Music Festival at Welford Road Stadium on 25 July. The album's third promotional single, "Dead Man's Shoes", was released on 19 September 2014. "Little Secrets", featuring Mr Probz, is the album's second single. It was released on 7 December 2014, peaking at number 83 on the UK Singles Chart.

== Background ==
Green expressed interest to work with artists such as former collaborators Emeli Sandé and Lily Allen, as well as Ed Sheeran and Lana Del Rey on the album, however, no collaborations featuring any of the listed names are featured. Green announced that production on the album would come from the likes of Mike Skinner, Sid Wilson of Slipknot, iSHi, Pharrell Williams and Skrillex. However, Example doesn't feature on the album version. A promotional non-album single, titled "Are You Getting Enough?", featuring Miles Kane, was released on 21 July 2013. After the single failed to chart in the top 100, Green announced that the first "proper" single from the album would be released in January 2014 and the album would follow shortly. These were later delayed to July and September 2014 respectively. He has also delayed his planned UK tour twice, firstly from November 2013 to May 2014, and then May 2014 to December 2014, to coincide with the release of the album.

Green also performed new tracks entitled titled "I Need Church" and "Little Secrets" in his 2013 live sets. Green has also posted clips of new songs "Name in Lights" (produced by Cores and featuring Rizzle Kicks) and "Jealous Girl" on his Instagram. Tweets and Instagram posts have also revealed a collaboration with Wretch 32 and iSHi titled "Gross" and another track titled "The Middle". Green also posted a short clip of a collaboration with iSHI and Ella Eyre which didn't make the album. On 14 April 2014 Green released a 54-second teaser of the album's first promotional single, "Not Your Man", which features vocals from Thabo. In 2014, he appeared on a remix of "German Whip" by Meridian Dan, also featuring Skepta, Bossman Birdie and Jordan Stephens. "Not Your Man" premiered in full on 3 July 2014, and was released on 5 July as an "instant grat" download on iTunes when you pre-ordered the album. The album's second "instant grat" promotional single, "I Need Church", was released on 16 July. The lead single from the album, "Lullaby" featuring Tori Kelly, was released on 14 September 2014. "Dead Man's Shoes" was released as the third and final instant grat single on 19 September 2014. Growing Up in Public was released on 22 September 2014.

== Critical reception ==
Professional ratings
Aggregate scores
Source	Rating
Metacritic	45/100
Review scores
Source	Rating
Clash	3/10
The Guardian	3/5 stars
MusicOMH	2.5/5 stars
The Observer	2/5 stars
RapReviews	3/10

According to the review aggregator Metacritic, Growing Up in Public received "mixed or average reviews" based on a weighted average score of 45 out of 100 from 5 critic scores.

== Track listing ==
Growing Up in Public track listing
No.	Title	Writer(s)	Producer(s)	Length
1.	"I Need Church"	Stephen Manderson; Mustafa Omer; James Murray	Mojam	4:08
2.	"Dead Man's Shoes" (featuring James Craise)	Manderson; James Craise; Omer; Murray; Mark Everett; John Parish	Mojam	3:25
3.	"Lullaby" (featuring Tori Kelly)	Manderson; Chris Crowhurst; Ina Wroldsen	Chris Loco	4:53
4.	"Little Secrets" (featuring Mr Probz)	Manderson; Tom Hull	Kid Harpoon; Alex "Cores" Hayes	3:58
5.	"Name in Lights" (featuring Rizzle Kicks)	Manderson; Alex "Cores" Hayes; Jordan Stephens; Harley Alexander-Sule; Edward Hayes	Alex "Cores" Hayes	3:13
6.	"Fast Life"	Manderson; Omer; Murray	Mojam	3:42
7.	"Can't Dance Without You" (featuring Whinnie Williams)	Manderson; Lily Allen; Tom Barnes; Ben Kohn; Pete Kelleher	TMS	3:08
8.	"Not Your Man" (featuring Thabo)	Manderson; Felix Joseph; James Walsh	Felix Joseph	3:28
9.	"In the Shadow of the Sun"	Manderson; Crowhurst; Tom Liljegren; Alexander Ryberg; Joseph Khajadourian; Alex Schwartz	Chris Loco; The Futuristics	3:56
10.	"Growing Up in Public"	Manderson; Khalil Abdul-Rahman; Erik Alcock; Pranam Injeti	The New Royales	3:25

iTunes Store bonus track
No.	Title	Writer(s)	Producer(s)	Length
11.	"Not Your Man" (Remix) (featuring Thabo, CASisDEAD and Dream Mclean)	Manderson; Joseph; Walsh; Andre Mclean; Charlie Williams	Felix Joseph	4:33

Deluxe edition bonus tracks
No.	Title	Writer(s)	Producer(s)	Length
12.	"Hugs and Kisses" (featuring Fekky and Stormzy)	Manderson; Fekky; David Osei; Yogi Tulsiani; Deleon Blake	Yogi	3:48
13.	"Lullaby" (Capital FM Radio Session)	Manderson; Crowhurst; Wroldsen	Chris Loco	5:16
14.	"Are You Getting Enough?" (featuring Miles Kane)	Manderson; Miles Kane; Hull	Kid Harpoon	3:06

Notes

- "In the Shadow of the Sun" samples vocals and production from "Shadow of the Sun" by Max Elto (f.k.a. Taped Rai)

== Personnel ==
- Richard Adlam – drum programming
- Samuel Agard – drums
- Erik Alcock – songwriter
- Harley Alexander-Sule – songwriter
- Lily Allen – songwriter
- Matt Allen – guitar
- Iyiola Babalola – engineer
- Lorraine Barnes – choir/chorus
- Tom Barnes – songwriter, drums
- Awsa Bergstrom – choir/chorus
- Jules Buckley – string arrangements
- Wez Clarke – mixing, programming
- James Craise – songwriter, featured artist, vocals
- DJ Khalil – engineer, instrumentation, producer, programming
- Mark O. Everett – songwriter
- Future Cut – vocal producer
- The Futuristics – keyboards, producer, programming
- John Gibbons – choir/chorus
- Rick Guest – photography
- Wendy Harriott – choir/chorus
- Stuart Hawkes – mastering
- Alex "Cores" Hayes – additional production, songwriter, engineer, executive producer, keyboards, producer, programming, vocal engineer, vocal producer
- Edward Hayes – songwriter, guitar
- Warren Huart – vocal engineer
- Tom Hull – songwriter
- Ken "Duro" Ifill – mixing
- Pranam Injeti – songwriter, engineer, instrumentation, producer, programming
- Felix Joseph – songwriter, engineer, producer, programming
- Pete Kelleher – songwriter, keyboards
- Tori Kelly – featured artist, vocals
- Joe Khajadourian – songwriter
- Kid Harpoon – engineer, guitar, producer, programming
- Ben Kohn – bass, songwriter
- KZ – keyboards, percussion, producer, programming
- Jenny LaTouche – choir/chorus
- Darren Lewis – engineer
- Tom Liljegren – songwriter
- Chris Loco – songwriter, engineer, keyboards, percussion, producer, programming
- Stephen Manderson – songwriter, executive producer
- Patsy McKay – choir/chorus, choir arrangement
- Beverlyn McKinson – choir/chorus
- Metropole Orkest – strings
- Mr. Probz – featured artist, vocals
- Mojam Music – engineer, producer, programming
- James Murray – songwriter, guitar
- Mustafa Omer – songwriter
- John Parish – songwriter
- Adam Prendergast – bass
- Professor Green – primary artist, vocals
- Khalil Abdul Rahman – songwriter
- Alex Reeves – drums
- Hal Ritson – sample organization
- Rizzle Kicks – featured artist, vocals
- Alexander Ryberg – songwriter
- Alex Schwartz – songwriter
- Aaron Sokell – choir/chorus
- Diana Stanbridge – choir/chorus
- Mark "Spike" Stent – mixing
- Jordan Stephens – songwriter
- Geoff Swan – mixing assistant
- Thabo – featured artist, vocals
- TMS – engineer, producer
- Jack Vasiliou – choir/chorus
- James Walsh – songwriter, guitar
- Whinnie Williams – featured artist, vocals
- Ina Wroldsen – songwriter, vocal arrangement

Credits adapted from AllMusic.

== Charts ==
Chart performance for Growing Up in Public
Chart (2014)	Peak position
Irish Albums (IRMA)	63
Scottish Albums (Official Charts)	17
UK Albums (Official Charts)	12
UK R&B Albums (Official Charts)	1

== Release history ==
Release history and formats for Growing Up in Public
Country	Release date	Format(s)
Ireland	19 September 2014	CD; digital download
United Kingdom	22 September 2014	CD; digital download
Japan	24 September 2014	CD; digital download
