= Avalon (Professor Green song) =

Single by Professor Green featuring Sierra Kusterbeck

from the album At Your Inconvenience
- Released: 21 September 2012
- Recorded: 2011
- Genre: Hip-hop; rap rock
- Length: 4:45
- Label: Virgin
- Songwriters: Stephen Manderson; Mustafa Omar; James Murray; Luke Juby; Emeli Sandé
- Producer: Mojam

Professor Green singles chronology
"Dreamers" (2012)	"Avalon" (2012)	"Are You Getting Enough?" (2013)

Sierra Kusterbeck singles chronology
"Avalon" (2012)	"West Coast" (2013)

Music video
- "Avalon" on YouTube

"Avalon" is a song by British rapper Professor Green, taken from his second studio album, At Your Inconvenience. The track features vocals from singer-songwriter Sierra Kusterbeck. The track serves as the album's fourth official single, and was released as a digital download in the United Kingdom on 16 September 2012. For its single release, the track has been remixed, with a heavier, guitar-laden sound. A music video to accompany the release of "Avalon" was filmed on 23 August 2012. Kusterbeck appeared in the video alongside Green.

Prior to release, the song featured on the first ever Relentless TV advert featuring footage of Professor Green drinking the energy drink whilst vandalizing cars by walking on top of their roofs, and performing the track live alongside Sierra Kusterbeck. For the advert, the lyric in the first verse was adjusted in order to mention Relentless. The video was directed by Ross Cairns and filmed at various locations in London. Professor Green is a Relentless Energy Drink brand ambassador.

== Track listing ==
Promotional CD single
No.	Title	Length
1.	"Avalon" (Radio Edit)	3:27
2.	"Avalon" (Single Version)	4:45
3.	"Avalon" (featuring Sierra Kusterbeck)	4:45

Digital download
No.	Title	Length
1.	"Avalon" (Radio Edit)	3:24
2.	"Avalon" (TV Ad Version)	4:33
3.	"Avalon" (Kat Krazy Remix)	3:31
4.	"Avalon" (Jamie Grind Remix)	3:51
5.	"Avalon" (Patrick Hagenaar Club Mix)	6:10
6.	"Avalon" (Kat Krazy Extended Mix)	4:48
7.	"Avalon" (Single Version)	4:44
8.	"Avalon" (featuring Sierra Kusterbeck)	4:45

== Charts ==
Chart (2012)	Peak position
Ireland (IRMA)	95
UK Singles (OCC)	29

== Release history ==
Region	Date	Format	Label
United Kingdom	24 September 2012	Digital download	Virgin Records
