= Sierra Kay =

American singer-songwriter and model

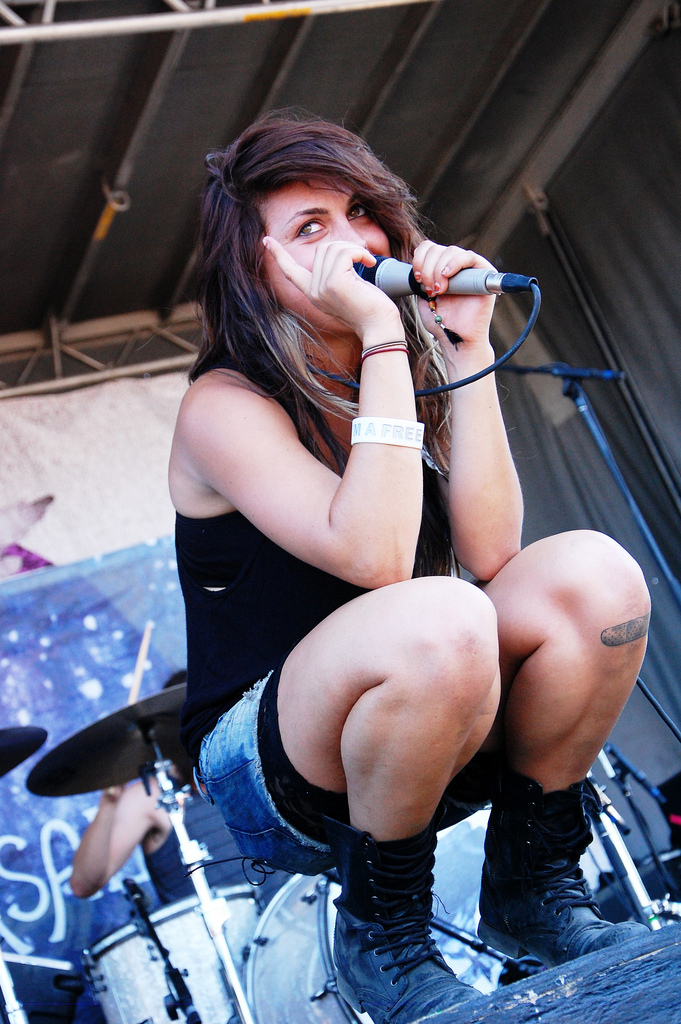
- Kay performing on the 2010 Warped Tour.

Background information
- Born: Sierra Kay Kusterbeck; December 18, 1990 (age 35); St. Petersburg, Florida, U.S.
- Genres: Alternative rock; experimental rock
- Occupations: Singer-songwriter; model
- Instrument: Vocals
- Years active: 2007–present
- Label: Fueled by Ramen

Sierra Kay Kusterbeck (born December 18, 1990), better known as Sierra Kay, is an American singer-songwriter and model. She rose to prominence as the lead vocalist of the rock band VersaEmerge.

== Early life ==
Kusterbeck was born and raised in St. Petersburg, Florida. She began taking vocal lessons in the third grade. She attended the arts-centric PCCA Gibbs High School in St. Petersburg for three years as a Musical Theatre major, but dropped out of high school to pursue music as a career.

== Career ==
=== VersaEmerge ===
Kusterbeck auditioned to be VersaEmerge's lead vocalist in 2006, by sending a tape of herself singing one of VersaEmerge's songs, "The Blank Static Screen".

VersaEmerge released their first EP with Kusterbeck on vocals, Perceptions, in May 2008. They were signed to Fueled by Ramen in 2008, and they released their self-titled EP in 2009 and their debut album Fixed at Zero the following year.

In October 2010, Kusterbeck appeared alongside her bandmates from VersaEmerge on the MTV documentary series called World of Jenks, which followed the band around documenting their experiences performing at Warped Tour. The episode focused mainly on Sierra, covering her experiences as a young and new female lead in a male dominated genre.

=== Neaux ===
In 2016, Kay and Nick Fit of Trash Talk started the band Neaux (pronounced "nOH"). Described as an Indie/post-punk band, they released their debut album "Fell Off The Deep End" in 2016.

In August 2017, they announced the release of their second album, Chain Up The Sun, released on The Native Sounds.

=== Bad Daughter ===
On September 16, 2019, Kay released her debut single "Im too much", as Bad Daughter on bandcamp.

On February 13, 2020, Kay released the single "Disappear", as Bad Daughter on bandcamp.

On May 10, 2020, Kay released the single "Fucking Depressed", as Bad Daughter on bandcamp.

=== Other work ===
Kay is featured on fellow Floridian band A Day to Remember's song, "If It Means a Lot to You" from their third album titled Homesick. Kay has been shown in live videos singing the song with the band.

Kay featured on English rapper Professor Green's album At Your Inconvenience, on the track "Avalon". The track was later used as part of an advertising campaign for the energy drink Relentless.

In mid to late 2011, Kay revealed that she was called to be the face of a line of shoes for Payless, a shoe company, called Brash. The line was released in early August.

== Personal life ==
She currently lives in Brooklyn, New York.

== Discography ==
=== As featured artist ===
Title	Year	Peak chart positions		Album
Title	Year	UK	IRE	Album
"Avalon" (Professor Green featuring Sierra Kusterbeck)	2012	29	95	At Your Inconvenience
"Dance to Your Heartbeat" (Wrongchilde featuring Sierra Kusterbeck)	2014	—N/a	—N/a	Gold Blooded
"Dance 2 Your Heartbeat" (Tommie Sunshine and Disco Fries X Wrongchilde featuring Sierra Kay)	2018	—N/a	—N/a	Non-album single

=== Guest appearances ===
Title	Year	Certifications	Album
"If It Means a Lot to You" (A Day to Remember featuring Sierra Kusterbeck)	2009	RIAA: Platinum	Homesick
"Contagious" (Anarbor featuring Sierra Kusterbeck)	2011		The Mixtape
"West Coast" (Brown & Gammon featuring Sierra Kusterbeck)	2013		Non-album single
"(No) Faith in Fate" (I the Mighty featuring Sierra Kay)	2015		Connector
"Lines of Your Hands" (The Devil Wears Prada featuring Sierra Kay)	2019		The Act
