= D.P.M.O (song) =

- French remix cover

Promotional single by Professor Green

from the album At Your Inconvenience
- Released: 24 February 2012
- Recorded: 2011
- Genre: Hip hop; rap rock
- Length: 3:58; 3:11 (remix)
- Label: Virgin
- Songwriters: Stephen Manderson; Jared "Blake" Scharff; Andrew "Broadway" Williams; Aurélien Cotentin (remix)
- Producers: Youngboyz; Jared Scharff

Professor Green chronology
How Many Moons (2012)	D.P.M.O (2012)	Remedy (2012)

Orelsan chronology
La terre est ronde (2011)	D.P.M.O (2012)	Ils sont cools (2012)

Audio sample
- file; help

"D.P.M.O" (acronym for Don't Piss Me Off) is a song by British rapper Professor Green, from his second studio album At Your Inconvenience. A remix featuring French rapper Orelsan was released in France as a promotional single on 24 February 2012.

== Track listing ==
Digital download (remix)
No.	Title	Length
1.	"D.P.M.O" (featuring Orelsan)	3:11

== Chart performance ==
Chart (2012)	Peak position
France (SNEP)	160

== Release history ==
Region	Date	Format	Label
Belgium	24 February 2012	Digital download	Virgin Records
