= Lecture 1 =

Lecture #1

Mixtape by Professor Green
- Released: 18 March 2006
- Recorded: 2005–2006
- Genre: Grime; British hip hop
- Length: 38:22
- Label: The Beats
- Producer: Mike Skinner; Apatight; Miligram; Alex "Cores" Hayes; Epidemix; Magic Millrain

Professor Green chronology
Lecture #1 (2006)	The Green EP (2008)

Singles from Lecture #1
- 1. "Before I Die" Released: 11 March 2006; 2. "Stereotypical Man" Released: 7 July 2006; 3. "Hard Night Out / Upper Clapton Dance" Released: 18 October 2006

"Lecture #1" is a mixtape released by English rapper Professor Green via his original record label, The Beats. The Mixtape was released on March 18, 2006, long before his mainstream breakthrough with Alive Till I'm Dead. The Mixtape features guest vocals from the likes of Nyomi Gray, Loudmouth, Skinnyman and Chynaman. Three singles were released from the Mixtape: "Before I Die", "Stereotypical Man" and the double A-side of "Hard Night Out" and "Upper Clapton Dance". "Upper Clapton Dance" later went on to be included as a bonus track on Green's second official studio album, At Your Inconvenience.

== Track listing ==
No.	Title	Producer(s)	Length
1.	"Hello"		0:28
2.	"Are They Rappin' Like Pro?" (Can I Have It Like That Remix) (featuring Nyomi Gray)		3:59
3.	"Stereotypical Man"	Mike Skinner	3:06
4.	"Before I Die"	Epidemix	3:30
5.	"Dirty Harry Drunken Freestyle" (Live on Semtex's 'Greatest Show Ever')		3:21
6.	"Without Trying" (featuring Loudmouth)	Apatight	4:24
7.	"Save Him" (featuring Nyomi Gray)	Miligram	2:05
8.	"Stay High (So Fly Remix)"		1:58
9.	"So Sick, No Really (So Sick Remix)"		1:00
10.	"Same Old Me"	Alex "Cores" Hayes	3:56
11.	"Drunken Freestyle #2 (Live @ Carling Academy Angel)" (featuring Skinnyman)		1:32
12.	"Lick Shots (Hip Hop Remix)"		3:41
13.	"Upper Clapton Dance" (featuring Chynaman of Haunted House and C.O.R.E)	Alex "Cores" Hayes	3:40
14.	"Goodbye"	Magic "Mike" Millrain	0:21

== Singles ==
=== Before I Die ===
- 12" vinyl
1. "Before I Die" - Album Version
2. "Before I Die" - MC Remix Version featuring Plan B, Example, Ghetts and Big Narstie
3. "Before I Die" - Radio Friendly Version w/out Intro
4. "Before I Die" - Acapella
5. "Before I Die" - Instrumental
- CD single
1. "Before I Die" - Radio Friendly Version w/Intro
2. "Before I Die" - Rude Edit
3. "Before I Die" - MC Remix Version featuring Plan B, Example, Ghetts and Big Narstie

=== Stereotypical Man ===
- 12" vinyl
1. "Stereotypical Man" - Dirty Version
2. "Stereotypical Man" - Ad Lib Version
3. "Stereotypical Man" - Instrumental
4. "Stereotypical Man" - Clean Version
- CD single
1. "Stereotypical Man"
2. "Runnin' to the Exit"
3. "Before I Die" - Acapella
4. "Same Old Me"

=== Upper Clapton Dance ===
- CD single
1. "Hard Night Out"
2. "Upper Clapton Dance"
