= Where the Mind Wants to Go / Where You Let It Go =

Studio album by I the Mighty
- Released: 20 October 2017
- Recorded: 2016–2017
- Genre: Progressive rock, post-hardcore, alternative rock
- Length: 44:49
- Label: Equal Vision Records

I the Mighty chronology
Connector (2015)	Where the Mind Wants to Go / Where You Let It Go (2017)

Singles from Where the Mind Wants to Go / Where You Let It Go
- 1. "Silver Tongues (feat. Tilian)" Released: August 29, 2017

Where the Mind Wants to Go / Where You Let It Go is the third wide-release album from American rock band I the Mighty, released on October 20, 2017 through Equal Vision Records.

== Background ==
The band announced the album on 29 August 2017, with a release date of 20 October 2017. Along with this announcement the band released the video for the lead single 'Silver Tongues' featuring Tilian Pearson of Dance Gavin Dance.

Professional ratings
Review scores
Source	Rating
Alternative Press	3.5/5 stars
Sputnik Music	3/5 stars
New Noise Magazine	4/5 stars
Kill Your Stereo	75/100
Distorted Sound Magazine	8/10
The Sound Board	6/10
DEAD PRESS!	9/10 stars

== Track listing ==
No.	Title	Length
1.	"Degenerates"	5:14
2.	"Pet Names"	3:42
3.	"Chaos in Motion"	3:15
4.	"Where the Mind Wants to Go"	3:52
5.	"Symphony of Skin"	3:45
6.	"Sleepwalker"	3:53
7.	"Escapism"	3:41
8.	"111 Winchester"	4:35
9.	"The Sound of Breathing"	4:27
10.	"Silver Tongues" (feat. Tilian)	4:18
11.	"Where You Let It Go"	4:07
Total length:		44:49

== Personnel ==
Credits from AllMusic.

I the Mighty

- Brent Walsh – rhythm guitar, lead vocals
- Ian Pedigo – lead guitar, backing vocals
- Chris Hinkley – bass guitar, backing vocals
- Blake Dahlinger – drums, percussion

Additional musicians

- Tilian Pearson – Composer, Featured Artist

Artwork

- Davis Ayer - Artwork, Photography

Production

- Neal Avron - Mixing
- Courtney Ballard - Composer, Producer
- Casey Bates - Engineer, Producer
- Kris Crummett - Bass Engineer, Drum Engineering, Mastering, Mixing, Vocal Engineer
- Blake Dahlinger - Producer, Programming
- Eric Palmquist - Composer
- Curtis Peoples - Composer
- Jared Poythress - Additional Production, Composer, Programming
- Dan Sandshaw - A&R
