= The Green EP (Professor Green EP) =

EP by Professor Green
- Released: 5 November 2008
- Recorded: 2008
- Genre: Grime; British hip hop
- Length: 27:41
- Label: Green Machine
- Producer: Taz Buckfaster; Nutty P.; Miligram; Mr. Snowman; Swindle

Professor Green chronology
Lecture 1 (2006)	The Green EP (2008)	Alive Till I'm Dead (2010)

Singles from The Green EP
- 1. "Don't Let Go" Released: 17 October 2008

The Green EP is an extended play released by English rapper Professor Green on his own record label, Green Machine. The EP was released on November 5, 2008, long before his mainstream breakthrough with Alive Till I'm Dead. The EP features guest vocals from the likes of Nyomi Gray, Adele and Ed Hayes. The EP was produced after Green's first record label, The Beats, went into administration. "Don't Let Go", featuring NY, was the first and only single to be released from the EP. The song was produced by Taz Buckfaster, a DJ from Glasgow, Scotland. Notably, singer Adele is featured on the track "Hometown", a remix of her 2007 song "Hometown Glory".

== Track listing ==
No.	Title	Writer(s)	Producer(s)	Length
1.	"Don't Let Go" (featuring Nyomi Gray)	Stephen Manderson • Andrea Martin • Ivan Matias • Marqueze Ethridge • Organized Noize	Taz Buckfaster	4:03
2.	"Intermission"		Milagram	0:56
3.	"Trunk Shit"	Manderson	Milagram	3:33
4.	"Big Wide World"		Swindle	3:07
5.	"Become of Us" (featuring Snowman)		Mr. Snowman	3:25
6.	"Hometown Glory" (featuring Adele)	Manderson • Adele Adkins	Nutty P	3:23
7.	"Reefer Dreaming"		Milagram	3:24
8.	"Here I Come"		Milagram	2:55
9.	"Maybe" (featuring Ed Hayes)		Milagram	4:15
