= Stylechanger =

Single by Eric Turner featuring Kardinal Offishall, Wretch 32 and Professor Green

from the album Eric Turner: The Life
- Released: February 24, 2012
- Recorded: 2011
- Genre: Post-dubstep, alternative hip hop, grime
- Length: 5:56
- Label: Capitol
- Songwriters: Eric Turner, Jason Harrow, Jermaine Sinclair, Stephen Manderson, Eshraque Mughal, Charlie Bernardo Kågell
- Producers: iSHi, Charlie Bernardo

Eric Turner singles chronology
"Angels & Stars" (2012)	"Stylechanger" (2012)	"Dancing in My Head" (2012)

Kardinal Offishall singles chronology
"Ghetto Love" (2011)	"Stylechanger" (2012)	"Can't Choose" (2013)

Wretch 32 singles chronology
"Forgiveness" (2011)	"Stylechanger" (2012)	"Go In, Go Hard" (2012)

Professor Green singles chronology
"Never Be a Right Time" (2012)	"Stylechanger" (2012)	"Remedy" (2012)

"Stylechanger" is a song by Swedish-American singer-songwriter Eric Turner, featuring Canadian rapper Kardinal Offishall and British rappers Wretch 32 and Professor Green. The song was released as Turner's second solo single in the United States on February 24, 2012. It was made available as part of a mixtape/EP containing seven other tracks.

== Background ==
"Stylechanger" was written by Turner, Professor Green, Wretch 32, Kardinal Offishall and "iSHi" Mughal, and produced by the latter. The song was first leaked online on January 4, 2012, before being officially released on February 24, 2012. The music video was also released on January 4, 2012. The video was directed by P.R. Brown. The video features Turner performing the song at various scenes, including on the Hollywood Walk of Fame, inside a recording studio and in the main showroom of an art gallery. Professor Green, Wretch 32 and Kardinal Offishall all make cameo appearances in the video, performing their respective parts of the song.

== Track listing ==
Digital download
No.	Title	Length
1.	"Stylechanger" (featuring Kardinal Offishall, Wretch 32 and Professor Green)	5:56

Digital mixtape
No.	Title	Length
1.	"Written in the Stars, Part II" (Tinie Tempah featuring Eric Turner)	2:58
2.	"Stylechanger" (featuring Kardinal Offishall, Wretch 32 and Professor Green)	5:56
3.	"Break the Chain 2.0" (Lupe Fiasco featuring Eric Turner)
4.	"Dream On" (featuring G FrSH)	2:48
5.	"Waves of You"	4:29
6.	"Old Soul"	3:28
7.	"Stereo Sun 2.0"	3:12
8.	"Pretenders"	4:17

== Release history ==
Region	Date	Format	Label
United States	24 February 2012	Digital download	Capitol Records
United States	24 February 2012	Digital EP/mixtape	Capitol Records
