= Connector (I the Mighty album) =

Studio album by I the Mighty
- Released: 2 June 2015
- Recorded: Fall 2014
- Genres: Progressive rock, post-hardcore, alternative rock
- Length: 44:26
- Label: Equal Vision Records

I the Mighty chronology
Satori (2013)	Connector (2015)	Where the Mind Wants to Go / Where You Let It Go (2017)

Singles from Connector
- 1. "Playing Catch With .22" Released: March 27, 2015; 2. "Adrift" Released: May 3, 2015; 3. "Friends (feat. Max Bemis)" Released: May 22, 2015

Connector is the second wide-release album from American rock band I the Mighty, released on June 2, 2015 through Equal Vision Records.

== Background ==
I the Mighty announced the album on March 27, 2015, with the release of their first single "Playing Catch with .22". They also released that Max Bemis would be featured on the track "Friends", as well as their plan complete the "Frame" trilogy with the final installment and first chapter of the story.

== Reception ==
Professional ratings
Review scores
Source	Rating
AbsolutePunk	6/10 stars
Sputnik Music	4/5 stars
New Noise Magazine	4/5 stars
Alternative Press	4/5 stars

The album has been met with positive reviews since its release. Reviewers praised the band's newfound pop sensibilities and tightly focused arrangements.

== Track listing ==
No.	Title	Length
1.	"An Epilogue as a Prologue"	1:42
2.	"Lady of Death"	3:47
3.	"The Lying Eyes of Miss Erray"	4:06
4.	"Psychomachia"	4:05
5.	"Adrift"	2:59
6.	"Slow Dancing Forever"	2:33
7.	"Friends" (featuring Max Bemis)	5:04
8.	"Playing Catch with .22"	3:16
9.	"Andrew's Song"	4:00
10.	"The Hound and the Fox"	3:12
11.	"(No) Faith in Fate" (featuring Sierra Kay)	4:18
12.	"The Frame I: Betrayal in the Watchtower"	5:24

== Personnel ==
I the Mighty

- Brent Walsh – rhythm guitar, lead vocals
- Ian Pedigo – lead guitar, backing vocals
- Chris Hinkley – bass guitar, backing vocals
- Blake Dahlinger – drums, percussion

Additional musicians

- Max Bemis – guest vocals on "Friends"
- Sierra Kay – guest vocals on "(No) Faith in Fate"

Production

- Kris Crummett - Mastering
- Mike Green - Production
