= Little Secrets (Professor Green song) =

Single by Professor Green featuring Mr. Probz

from the album Growing Up in Public
- Released: 7 December 2014
- Genre: Pop; British hip hop
- Length: 4:00
- Label: Virgin
- Songwriters: Stephen Manderson; Tom Hull
- Producers: Kid Harpoon; Alex "Cores" Hayes

Professor Green singles chronology
"Lullaby" (2014)	"Little Secrets" (2014)	"Active" (2017)

Mr. Probz singles chronology
"Nothing Really Matters" (2014)	"Little Secrets" (2014)	"Another You" (2015)

Music video
- "Little Secrets" on YouTube

"Little Secrets" is a song by British pop singer Professor Green, featuring vocals from Dutch singer Mr. Probz. It was released on 7 December 2014 as the second and final single from Green's third studio album, Growing Up in Public (2014).

== Controversy ==
The X Factor winner James Arthur accused Green of stealing his lyrics for the song, as he was due to feature on the track but got pulled following some bad publicity. A source close to Green claims that the song was written by Kid Harpoon and Professor Green before James and Professor Green met.

== Track listing ==
Digital download – single
No.	Title	Length
1.	"Little Secrets" (featuring Mr. Probz)	3:59

Digital download – EP
No.	Title	Length
1.	"Little Secrets" (Tru Fonix Remix)	4:27
2.	"Little Secrets" (Seamus Haji Remix)	6:08
3.	"Little Secrets" (Wideboys Remix)	5:47
4.	"Little Secrets" (Tru Fonix Dub)	4:25

== Charts ==
Chart (2014)	Peak position
UK Hip Hop/R&B (Official Charts)	8
UK Singles (Official Charts)	83
