= Big H =

British grime MC

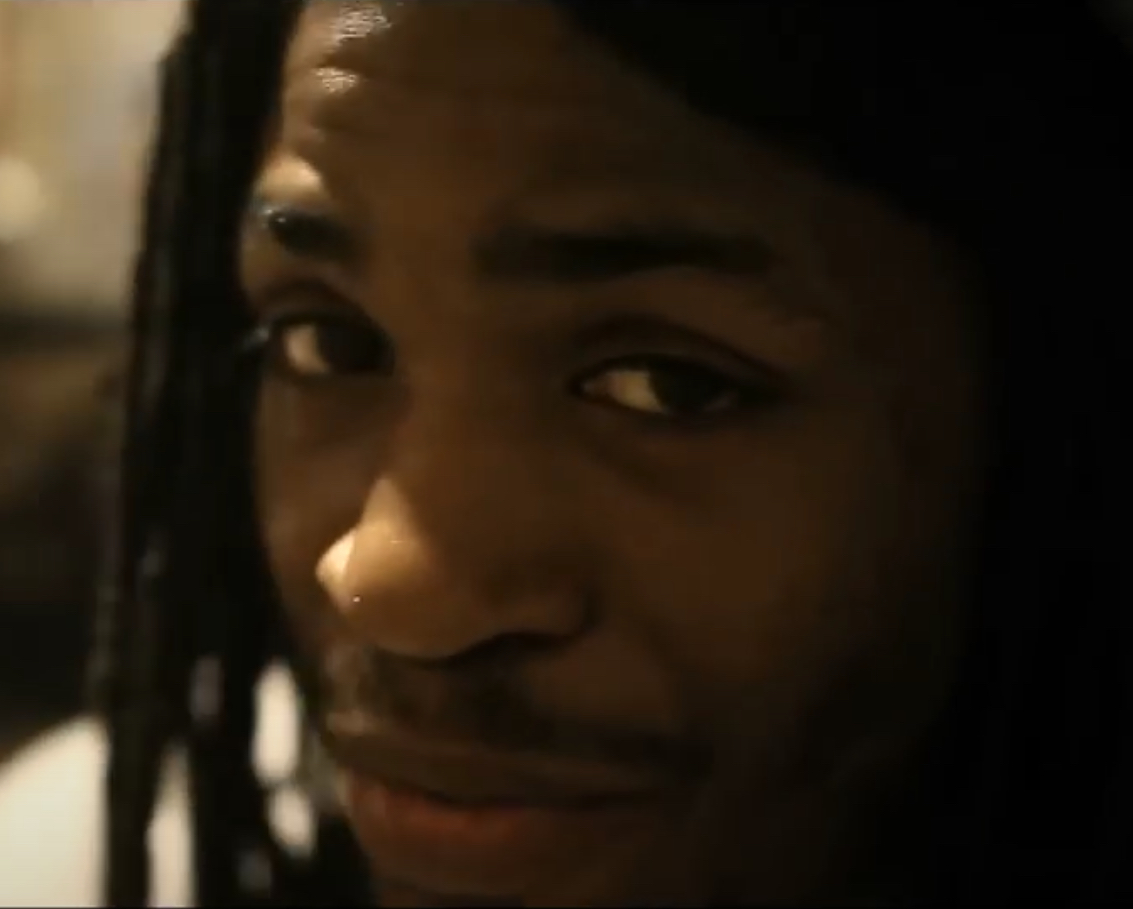
- Big H in 2012

Background information
- Also known as: Big Hooligan
- Born: Adrian Harris
- Origin: North London, England
- Genres: Grime; UK garage
- Occupations: Rapper; singer
- Years active: 2001–present
- Labels: Bloodline, Astronaut Music, King of Scotland, Boy Better Know

Adrian Harris, better known by his stage name Big H, is an English rapper from Tottenham, London, United Kingdom.

== Biography ==
Known for his distinctive style, H spent much of his life creating new music and "perfecting the flow". In 2009, H released his debut mixtape Street Crime UK.

He was originally a member of Meridian Crew before it split. Following a hiatus, Big H returned in 2012 to release "Mark of the Beast" and begin to ease himself back on to underground radio stations.

In mid-2013, Big H teamed up with the recently formed Inside Music, signing an album and management deal that would see the highly anticipated album finally released. Since then, Big H has found himself on a higher platform, appearing on Charlie Sloth's 1Xtra show, releasing another album Fire And Smoke and achieving commercial success on Meridian Dan's German Whip.

== Feuds ==
Big H has clashed with many other grime MCs and crews, notably Trim, Roll Deep, Manga, P Money, Wiley and Scratchy. In 2014, Big H participated in a controversial clash with P Money on Lord of the Mics 6, that ended abruptly after H pulled out of the clash.

== Discography ==
Albums

- Street Crime UK (2009)
- Fire and Smoke (2013)
- Zing Zing Zoom, Vol 1 (2015)
- The Oracle (TBC)

=== Singles ===
- Wake Up, produced by Flash G (2011)
- Mark of the Beast, produced by Youngz (2012)
- Nike Air Max, with President T and Bossman Birdie (2017)
- Rise Above (2017)

==== As featured artist ====
- 2014: German Whip (with Meridian Dan and JME)
