= Lullaby (Professor Green song) =

2014 single by Professor Green

Single by Professor Green featuring Tori Kelly

from the album Growing Up in Public
- Released: 14 September 2014
- Genre: Pop; British hip hop
- Length: 4:53 (album version); 3:58 (radio edit)
- Label: Virgin
- Songwriter(s): Stephen Manderson; Chris Crowhurst; Ina Wroldsen
- Producer(s): Chris Loco

Professor Green singles chronology
"Are You Getting Enough?" (2013)	"Lullaby" (2014)	"Little Secrets" (2014)

Tori Kelly singles chronology
"Lullaby" (2014)	"Nobody Love" (2015)

"Lullaby" is a song by British rapper Professor Green. It is a hip hop and pop song that features vocals from American singer Tori Kelly. It was released on 14 September 2014 as the lead single from Green's third studio album, Growing Up in Public.

== Background ==
The song was written about Manderson's late grandmother, who died when he was 13 years old. The song premiered on air on Nick Grimshaw's BBC Radio 1 show on 28 July 2014, but was played live first at Leicester Music Festival at Welford Road Stadium on 25 July 2014.

== Music video ==
A music video was produced for the song. It features both Green and Kelly. The video echoes the loss of his grandmother; it shows a young boy growing up with his grandfather who becomes unwell and dies. It shows each moment the boy spends with his grandfather when he is younger and flicks it forward in time. It shows the boy with his girlfriend who runs to tell the boy about his grandfather. The boys grandfather dies and at the end and shows how the boy copes. Halfway through the video the boy is lying in bed remembering his grandfather, quite like Professor Green did with his grandmother.

== Track listing ==
Digital download – single
No.	Title	Length
1.	"Lullaby" (featuring Tori Kelly)	4:53

Digital download – EP
No.	Title	Length
1.	"Lullaby" (Cutmore Remix)	6:03
2.	"Lullaby" (DC Breaks Remix)	4:35
3.	"Lullaby" (Adam Turner Remix)	7:01
4.	"Lullaby" (Cutmore Dub)	5:54

== Charts ==
Chart performance for "Lullaby"
Chart (2014)	Peak position
Czech Republic (Rádio – Top 100)	61
Czech Republic (Singles Digitál Top 100)	95
Ireland (IRMA)	58
Scotland (OCC)	4
UK Hip Hop/R&B (OCC)	1
UK Singles (OCC)	4

== Certifications ==
Certifications for "Lullaby"
Region	Certification	Certified units/sales
United Kingdom (BPI)	Gold	400,000^{‡}
^{‡} Sales+streaming figures based on certification alone.
