= Satori (I the Mighty album) =

Studio album by I the Mighty
- Released: 11 June 2013
- Recorded: Fall 2012
- Genre: Progressive rock, post-hardcore, alternative rock
- Length: 51:14
- Label: Equal Vision Records
- Producer: Erik Ron

I the Mighty chronology
Karma Never Sleeps (2012)	Satori (2013)	Connector (2015)

Satori is the debut wide-release album, second overall (as they released We Speak in 2010), from American rock band I the Mighty, released on June 11, 2013 through Equal Vision Records. The album peaked at #10 on the Billboard Heatseekers Charts.

== Background ==
The band announced they had started writing their Equal Vision debut in April 2012. They started recording the album during the fall of 2012, after touring extensively to support Karma Never Sleeps. They previously worked with producer Erik Ron on their aforementioned EP. The lead singer of The Material, Colleen D'Agostino, is featured on "Four Letter Words". Brent Walsh said that, as of October 8, the album was "somewhere around the 50% completion marker". Walsh went on to describe the writing and recording process, and the personal struggles he faced during the time period.

== Promotion and release ==
The first single and music video "Speak to Me" was released on April 10, 2013. A lyric video for "Echoes" was released on May 23, 2013. Song "Failures" had its music video debut on the same day as the record's release. The band went on to support label mates Say Anything on their headlining U.S tour from June 23 to July 12. The following fall, the band supported A Skylit Drive on their Rise Up tour. The album produced two more music videos, "A Spoonful of Shallow Makes Your Head an Empty Space" and "Four Letter Words", which were released on August 9 and September 20 respectively.

== Reception ==
Professional ratings
Review scores
Source	Rating
AbsolutePunk	9/10 stars
Sputnik Music	4/5 stars
Under The Gun Review	9/10 stars

The album has been met with highly positive reviews since its release. Reviewers praised the band's cohesive sound, Walsh's vocals, and the lyricism. Critics also favored opening track "Speak to Me" and the collaboration between Walsh and guest vocalist Colleen D'Agastino. Alex Trinker, of Sputnik Music, wrote, "Containing subtle (and so subtle) throwbacks to their previous ep, it is apparent that I The Mighty has hit upon a style that is entirely becoming of their talent level". The negative comments are directed at the album's length and lack of technical instrumentals. Having written a positive review, a reviewer for AbsolutePunk commented that, "This band definitely has direction, but the record is a bit lengthy. Because of that, some songs can get lost in the mix. The lasting value is great, however, because there’s a lot to take from it, so it may take a couple listens to really grasp this record".

== Track listing ==
No.	Title	Length
1.	"Speak to Me"	3:19
2.	"Failures"	5:13
3.	"Some Say It's Your Loss"	3:54
4.	"Ivy"	4:07
5.	"Artful Temptress (Paint Me Senseless)"	3:19
6.	"The Frame II: Keep Breathing"	4:51
7.	"Four Letter Words" (featuring Colleen D'Agostino)	4:08
8.	"Echoes"	4:19
9.	"Occupatience"	2:15
10.	"A Spoonful of Shallow Makes Your Head an Empty Space"	3:14
11.	"Embers"	4:17
12.	"Between the Lines"	4:04
13.	"The Quick Fix"	4:14

== Personnel ==
I the Mighty

- Brent Walsh – rhythm guitar, lead vocals
- Ian Pedigo – lead guitar, backing vocals
- Chris Hinkley – bass guitar, backing vocals
- Blake Dahlinger – drums, percussion

Additional musicians

- Colleen D'Agostino – guest vocals on "Four Letter Words"

Production

- Erik Ron - Producer
- Adrian Alvarado - Engineer
- Aaron Marsh - Artwork, layout
- Kyle Thompson - Photography
- UE Nastasi - Mastering
