= Champagne Lemonade =

Single by Ed Drewett

from the album Never Believe
- Released: 31 October 2010
- Recorded: 2009
- Genre: Dance-pop
- Length: 3:26
- Label: Virgin
- Songwriter(s): Ed Drewett, Ash Howes, Tim Powell

Ed Drewett singles chronology
| "I Need You Tonight" (2010) | "Champagne Lemonade" (2010) | "Never Be a Right Time" (2012) |

"Champagne Lemonade" is the debut solo single by English singer-songwriter Ed Drewett. The single was released on 31 October 2010 as a digital download. The single was a commercial disappointment, peaking at only No. 84 on the UK Singles Chart for only one week.

== Track listing ==
Digital download

| No. | Title | Length |
|---|---|---|
| 1. | "Champagne Lemonade" | 3:26 |
| 2. | "Champagne Lemonade" (Manhattan Clique remix) | 6:20 |
| 3. | "Champagne Lemonade" (Blame vocal remix) | 5:36 |
| 4. | "Champagne Lemonade" (The Fives remix) | 5:17 |
| 5. | "Champagne Lemonade" (Clouds Rise remix) | 4:52 |

== Chart performance ==
| Chart (2010) | Peak position |
|---|---|
| UK Singles (OCC) | 84 |

== Release history ==
| Region | Date | Format | Label |
|---|---|---|---|
| United Kingdom | 31 October 2010 | Digital Download | Virgin Records |
