= At Your Inconvenience (song) =

Single by Professor Green

from the album At Your Inconvenience
- Released: 26 July 2011
- Recorded: 2011
- Genre: Hip hop
- Length: 3:30
- Label: Virgin Records
- Songwriters: Stephen Manderson; Jason Morrison; Eddie Jefferys
- Producer: 16bit

Professor Green singles chronology
| "Jungle" (2011) | "At Your Inconvenience" (2011) | "Read All About It" (2011) |

"At Your Inconvenience" is a song by British rapper Professor Green. It was released as a promotional single from his second studio album of the same name. It was released on 26 July 2011 in the United Kingdom.

== Background ==
"At Your Inconvenience" was released as a promotional single from Green's second studio album and is the album's title-track. The song was premiered on Zane Lowe's BBC Radio 1 show on 13 July 2011. It was selected by Lowe to be in his hottest record in the world feature. The song features Green criticising the music industry, which he claims is dominated by dance music. He also refers to Wayne Rooney's reported escapades with a prostitute, John Terry and Wayne Bridge's former friendship and makes references to TV presenter Caroline Flack and tennis star Anna Kournikova.

"At Your Inconvenience" was released as an instant download when consumers pre-ordered the album from iTunes. The song was also available as an individual download, without having to pre-order the album. This release strategy was also used by Coldplay, also signed to EMI, whereby their single "Paradise" was available on iTunes as an "instant grat" – immediate download – when consumers pre-ordered their album Mylo Xyloto. This release strategy rendered both "At Your Inconvenience" and "Paradise" non-chart eligible in the UK until their parent albums were released as the incentive is against UK Singles Chart rules. The single later charted at number 97 upon the release of the album.

== Music video ==
The video to accompany the release of "At Your Inconvenience" was premiered at midnight on 10 August 2011 on Green's YouTube channel at a total length of three minutes and thirty-nine seconds. The video, according to Yahoo features "a host of very random objects from a clown to an ostrich – worth a watch just for that." Green also performed "At Your Inconvenience" live in Maida Vale studios for Zane Lowe's BBC Radio 1 show on 1 September 2011.

== Track listing ==
Digital download
| No. | Title | Length |
|---|---|---|
| 1. | "At Your Inconvenience" | 3:30 |

Promotional CD single
| No. | Title | Length |
|---|---|---|
| 1. | "At Your Inconvenience" (Clean Radio Edit) | 3:30 |
| 2. | "At Your Inconvenience" (Explicit Album Version) | 3:30 |
| 3. | "At Your Inconvenience" (Instrumental Version) | 3:30 |

== Chart performance ==
At the end of the release week for the At Your Inconvenience album, the single charted at number 97 on the UK Singles Chart and also charted at number 25 on the UK R&B Singles Chart.

| Chart (2011) | Peak position |
|---|---|
| UK R&B Singles Chart | 25 |
| UK Singles Chart | 97 |

== Release history ==
| Region | Date | Format | Label |
|---|---|---|---|
| Ireland | 26 July 2011 | Digital download | Virgin Records |
| United Kingdom | 26 July 2011 | Digital download | Virgin Records |
