= Are You Getting Enough? =

Single by Professor Green featuring Miles Kane

from the album Growing Up in Public (Deluxe Version)
- Released: 21 July 2013
- Recorded: 2012–13
- Genre: Rap rock; big beat; indie rock
- Length: 3:05
- Label: Virgin
- Songwriters: Stephen Manderson; Miles Kane; Tom Hull
- Producer: Kid Harpoon

Professor Green singles chronology
"Avalon" (2012)	"Are You Getting Enough?" (2013)	"Lullaby" (2014)

Miles Kane singles chronology
"Don't Forget Who You Are" (2013)	"Are You Getting Enough?" (2013)	"Taking Over" (2013)

Music video
- "Are You Getting Enough?" on YouTube

"Are You Getting Enough?" is a song by British rapper Professor Green, featuring singer Miles Kane. It was released on 21 July 2013 and it only appears on the deluxe version of Growing Up in Public. The track features vocals from the British singer Miles Kane. The song was written by Professor Green, Miles Kane and Kid Harpoon, and produced by Kid Harpoon.

== Background and release ==
On 24 May 2013, Green was due to perform at a student ball in Hartpury College. However, he was run over by a delivery van and broke his leg. Wretch 32 took to the stage as a last-minute replacement for the gig. During the same week, Green was due to premiere the single and announce details about the new album. Despite the traumatic circumstances, this still went ahead. The song received its debut on Zane Lowe's BBC Radio 1 show on 28 May 2013. It was later made available to stream via SoundCloud, which also saw the premiere of the official artwork. Regarding the track, Green tweeted the following:

"It's not read all about it pt. 4, it's not another 'i need you tonight'. it's not house. it is what is is. let's 'ave it!!!".

The Kaos remix features on the Ministry of Sound compilation The Sound of Dubstep Worldwide 4.

== Track listing ==
Digital download
No.	Title	Length
1.	"Are You Getting Enough?"	3:06
2.	"Are You Getting Enough?" (Drumsound & Bassline Smith Remix)	6:06
3.	"Are You Getting Enough?" (Kaos Remix)	3:10
4.	"Are You Getting Enough?" (If I Was A Fan Of Raf Riley I'd Dig This Mix)	3:12

== Charts ==
=== Weekly charts ===
Chart (2012)	Peak position
Belgium (Ultratop 50 Flanders)	112
UK Singles (OCC)	93

== Release history ==
Region	Date	Format	Label
United Kingdom	21 July 2013	Digital download	Virgin Records
