= Cutmore =

Cutmore is a surname. Notable people with the surname include:

- Geoff Cutmore (born 1966), English financial journalist for CNBC Europe
- Jack Cutmore-Scott (born 1987), British actor
- Jim Cutmore (1898−1985), English first-class cricketer
- John "Snowy" Cutmore, Australian criminal
