= I the Mighty =

American rock band

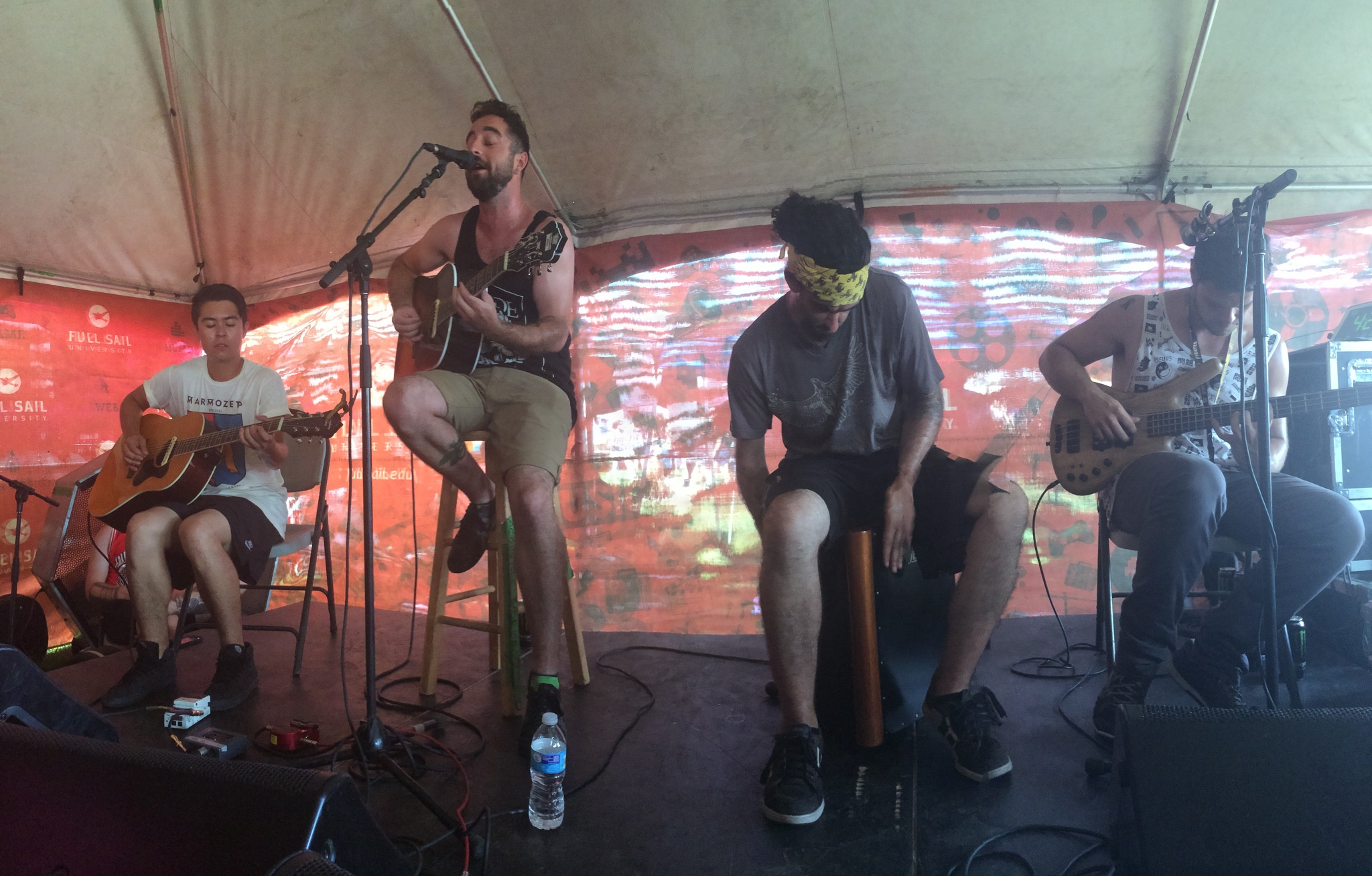

Background information
- Origin: San Francisco, California, U.S.
- Genres: Alternative rock; post-hardcore
- Years active: 2007–2020
- Labels: Equal Vision, LAB, Talking House Records, Adamant
- Members: Brent Walsh; Ian Pedigo
- Website: ithemighty.com

I the Mighty was an American rock band based out of San Francisco, California, formed in 2007. As of 2019, the band has released two singles, four EPs, and four studio albums. Their debut wide-release album, Satori, peaked at #10 on the Billboard Heatseekers Charts. In July 2020, the band announced an indefinite hiatus.

== History ==
=== Formation and We Speak (2007–2011) ===
Formed in 2007, the band began while vocalist Brent Walsh and Ian Pedigo were still in high school together. The two taught themselves how to play guitar, and then started writing songs together as a two-man acoustic project, Breakpoint, but changed their name due to copyright issues. They released an acoustic self-titled EP in 2008. Later they recruited Chris Hinkley, who Brent and Ian met five years prior to the band's formation while he was playing with another band. The three then began to practice acoustic songs that Walsh and Pedigo had penned. Blake Dahlinger saw the trio performing at the Retox Lounge and asked the group if they needed a drummer.

In February 2009, I the Mighty signed with San Francisco indie label Talking House Records and began recording their debut album, We Speak, at the label's in-house studio with Talking House's Peter Krawiec producing. Dahlinger and Hinkley wrote the parts for their instruments for the existing songs that had already been written. The lyrics were written mostly by Walsh, with the exception of the song "101," which was written by Pedigo. Talking House slated We Speak to be released on March 16, 2010. The initial run of CDs was pressed, early promotion had begun and a release event scheduled, but the label went under before the album could officially be released. The label returned the rights to its existing recordings to all its artists, and transferred all the We Speak CD stock to I the Mighty. The band decided to withhold the album initially from wide release, instead releasing a free EP called Hearts and Spades containing five songs from We Speak. The band later began offering the We Speak album a few at a time, directly to fans at shows. The band prepared the album for a re-release in 2020 and as a result became available for digital download on sites including Main Street Vinyl and Unsung Vinyl.

The group caught the attention of Brad Wiseman, a booking agent for Equal Vision Records. They sent him early demos of their songs "Cutting Room Floor" and "Escalators." The label sent the head of A&R out to see one of the band's shows in Los Angeles. They were signed to the label in 2011.

=== Karma Never Sleeps and Satori (2012–2014) ===
The band worked with Erik Ron for their third EP, Karma Never Sleeps. It was released on March 27, 2012, and serves as their debut on Equal Vision Records. It was met with positive reviews from fans and critics. The band embarked on a series of tours that year. In late 2012, they were a part of the Rock Yourself to Sleep Tour alongside bands Dance Gavin Dance, and A Lot Like Birds. The group supported Hands Like Houses on their US tour in March 2013, and later Set It Off on their North American tour.

The band started writing and recording for their Equal Vision debut album in late 2012. The band aimed to produce an album similar to Karma Never Sleeps, but still have some diversity. In an interview with Property of Zack, Walsh said, "It's kind of along the same lines as Karma Never Sleeps. I think we all stepped our game up a little bit. Everyone pushed themselves as hard as they possibly could. We wrote a bunch of stuff that's extremely hard for us to sing and play, that we're kind of learning now. Everyone pushed themselves really hard and everyone put everything they possibly had into this record. I think it shows when you listen to it".

Satori was released on June 11, 2013, to positive reviews. Again, the band worked with Erik Ron for the album. They toured extensively to support the album's release. They were a part of the Say Anything on their Say Anything: Rarities and More Tour from June 23 to July 12. Then in the fall they supported A Skylit Drive on their Rise Up Tour, and later Coheed and Cambria. They continued to tour in 2014, first supporting letlive. and Architects. The band later announced they would be a part of Vans Warped Tour 2014. While on tour, they released new song, "Love Your Sin", along with acoustic versions of "The Dreamer", and "Speak to Me".

=== Connector (2015–2016) ===
In early 2015, the band toured with Enter Shikari, Stray from the Path, and Hundredth in the Mindsweep Tour North America. On March 26, 2015, the band released a new single, Playing Catch with .22 from their next album Connector, during the tour. The album's release date was revealed to be June 2, 2015. A month after the premiere of their first single, they announced their first headlining tour with Hail the Sun and Too Close to Touch. The next single from Connector, "Adrift", was released on April 30, along with the accompanying music video. The third single, "Friends", released May 22, 2015, features Say Anything vocalist Max Bemis. A video for "The Lying Eyes of Miss Erray" was released on June 5. During its first week, the album charted on several Billboard charts, including Top Rock and Independent.

=== Where the Mind Wants to Go / Where You Let It Go and hiatus (2017–2020) ===
In the summer of 2017 the band made a brief trip to the UK for some shows, playing their first headline show in the UK with a sold-out show at The Barfly, and made an appearance at Download Festival sub-headlining the Dogtooth Stage. It was announced on June 22 that they would be supporting Bayside (band) on their 10th Anniversary UK Tour for their album The Walking Wounded. The band announced their official Facebook Community which would be run by the band in order to be a place for discussion and friendship with the aim to provide their core fan base perks when possible and access to news and announcements early. On August 22 it was revealed that the band's third album would be titled Where the Mind Wants to Go / Where You Let It Go and would be released on October 20, 2017. Along with this announcement the band released the video for the lead single 'Silver Tongues' featuring Tilian Pearson, former lead vocalist of Dance Gavin Dance. They also announced a headline tour starting October 21 with label mates Hail The Sun supporting and Good Tiger as special guests. Where the Mind Wants to Go / Where You Let It Go debuted at #61 on the Billboard 200. The band toured with Silverstein as part of Silverstein's 20 Year Anniversary Tour, however the tour was temporarily postponed due to the COVID-19 pandemic. I The Mighty was replaced following the postponement.

On July 23, 2020, Walsh was accused of the sexual assault that occurred in 2015 against a then nineteen year old woman. A statement recounting the alleged detail of events was published on Twitter. Later Walsh released a statement regarding the accusations against him on Twitter including a donation of $1000 to RAINN (Rape, Abuse & Incest National Network). In light of the events drummer Dahlinger left. The band announced they had decided on taking a indefinite hiatus following the accusations.

== Band members ==
Current members

- Brent Walsh – lead vocals, rhythm guitar (2007–2020 hiatus)
- Ian Pedigo – lead guitar, backing vocals (2007–2020 hiatus)
- Chris Hinkley – bass, backing vocals (2008–2020 hiatus)

Former members

- Blake Dahlinger – drums, percussion (2008–2020)

== Musical style ==
I the Mighty play a style of post-hardcore music mixed with progressive rock, experimental rock and alternative rock. Indie rock elements can be heard in their songs. The founding members Walsh and Pedigo draw strongly from Coheed and Cambria as a musical influence, and this is shown in much of their music.

== Discography ==
Studio albums

- We Speak (2010, Talking House Records)
- Satori (2013, Equal Vision Records)
- Connector (2015, Equal Vision Records)
- Where the Mind Wants to Go / Where You Let It Go (2017, Equal Vision Records)

EPs

- I the Mighty (2008, Adamant Records)
- Hearts and Spades (2010, self-released)
- Karma Never Sleeps (2012, Equal Vision Records)
- Oil in Water (2016, Equal Vision Records)

Singles

- Love Your Sin (2014, Equal Vision Records)
- Cave In (2019, Equal Vision Records)
