= RuthAnne =

Irish singer-songwriter (born 1986)

- Born: Ruth-Anne Cunningham; 2 April 1986 (age 40); Ireland
- Other name: Rooty
- Occupations: Singer; songwriter
- Years active: 2008–present
- Spouse: Ollie John Marland (m. 2022)
- Children: 2

Ruth-Anne Cunningham (born 2 April 1986), known professionally as RuthAnne, is an Irish singer-songwriter. She is best known for co-writing "Too Little Too Late", performed by the US singer JoJo, "In the Name of Love" performed by Martin Garrix and Bebe Rexha, "Work Bitch" performed by Britney Spears, "Slow Hands" performed by Niall Horan, "Where Do Broken Hearts Go", "No Control" performed by One Direction and "Beautiful World" performed by Westlife. She also wrote and vocally features on the Fifty Shades Darker soundtrack with her song "Pray". In 2013, she also has uncredited vocals for the EDM-oriented song, "All You Need is Love", on Swedish DJ Avicii's True album.

On 23 March 2018, Cunningham released her own first single "The Vow". Cunningham's debut album Matters of the Heart was released on 4 October 2019.

== Early life ==
Cunningham is from Donaghmede, Ireland. Her interest in performing began at the age of 7 and at age 12, Cunningham enrolled in the Billy Barry Stage School.

== Music career ==
When Cunningham was 17 she travelled to the U.S. for the first time where she co-wrote JoJo's hit single "Too Little Too Late" with Billy Steinberg and Josh Alexander. It went from number 66 to number 3 on the US Billboard Hot 100 chart in just one week. She was awarded the ASCAP Songwriters Best Pop Award at the 24th Annual ASCAP Awards in 2007 for "Too Little Too Late."

In 2018, she won two BMI awards for global hits "Slow Hands" by Niall Horan and "In the Name of Love" by Martin Garrix and Bebe Rexha.

On 13 July 2018, Cunningham supported Canadian singer Alanis Morissette at the Eventim Apollo in Hammersmith, London on her international tour.

On 17 December, she performed in her hometown Dublin at the Olympia Theatre supporting another Irish artist, Hozier.

In 2020, Cunningham was part of an Irish collective of female singers and musicians called Irish Women in Harmony, that recorded a version of the song "Dreams" in aid of the charity Safe Ireland, which deals with domestic abuse which had reportedly risen significantly during the COVID-19 lockdown.

== Awards ==
She won an ASCAP Pop Award in 2007 for "Too Little Too Late."

In 2023 RuthAnne was named Goss.ie’s Artist of the Year.

== Discography ==
=== Singles ===
==== As lead artist ====
Year	Title	Peak chart positions	Album
Year	Title	IRE	Album
2008	"Take Me Away"	13	Non-album single
2018	"The Vow"	-	Matters of the Heart
2018	"Take My Place"	-	Matters of the Heart
2018	"Liquid"	-	Matters of the Heart
2018	"It Is What It Is"	-	Matters of the Heart
2019	"Survivor"	-	Non-album single
2019	"Love Again"	-	Matters of the Heart
2019	"Superman"	-	Matters of the Heart
2019	"Unrequited"	-	Matters of the Heart
2019	"Cold Water"	-	Non-album single
2020	"Remember This"	-	The Way I Love You
2021	"F.L.Y."	-	The Way I Love You
2021	"Safe Place"	-	The Way I Love You
2023	"The Vow (Acoustic)"	-	Non-album single
2025	"The Way I'm Wired"	-	Non-album single

==== As featured artist ====
Year	Title	Peak chart positions		Album
Year	Title	IRE	UK	Album
2012	"Remedy" (Professor Green featuring Ruth Anne)	26	18	At Your Inconvenience
2013	"Heart Attack" (Major Look featuring RuthAnne)	–	–	Non-album single
2014	"Missing You" (Cedric Gervais featuring Rooty)	–	–	TBA
2015	"Paper Dolls" (Rob Thomas featuring Rooty)	–	–	The Great Unknown
2016	"Love's Just a Feeling" (Lindsey Stirling featuring Rooty)	–	–	Brave Enough
2017	"Pray" (JRY featuring Rooty)	–	–	Fifty Shades Darker: Original Motion Picture Soundtrack
2018	"15 Sleeps" (KO:YU featuring RuthAnne)	–	–	Non-album single
2023	"Anyway" (Cash Cash featuring RuthAnne)	–	–	Non-album single
2023	"Feel The Same" (Ian Asher featuring RuthAnne)	–	–	Non-album single
2023	"Honey" (DecPierce featuring RuthAnne)	–	–	Non-album single

== Songwriting ==
Artist	Date	Album	Song	Co-Written With	Charts and Awards
JoJo	2006	The High Road	Too Little Too Late	Billy Steinberg	Peaked at No. 4 in the Official UK Chart
ABREU	2007	Anna Abreu	Are You Ready	Daniel O'Donoghue	
Katharine McPhee	2007	Katharine McPhee	Over It	Billy Steinberg, Josh Alexander	
Sarah Connor	2008	Sexy As Hell	Fall Apart	Evan "Kidd" Boggart, Franne Golde, Jonathan Rotem	
Newton Faulkner	2009	Rebuilt By Humans	Over & Out	Ben Earle, Craigie Dodds, Newton Faulkner	
Tata Young	2009	Ready for Love	Perfection	Billy Steinberg, Shelly Peiken, Josh Alexander, Leona Lewis	
Sasha-Lee	2009	Sasha-Lee	Waiting Room	Christopher Lee-Joe, Phillippe-Marc Arquetil	
Pixie Lott	2009	Turn It Up	My Love	Jonas Jeberg, Pixie Lott, Mich Hansen	
Pixie Lott	2009	Turn It Up	Turn It Up	Jonas Jeberg, Pixie Lott, Mich Hansen	
Pixie Lott	2009	Turn It Up	Broken Arrow	Pixie Lott, Toby Gad	
Nadine Coyle	2010	Insatiable	Runnin'	Julian Bunetta	
Devlin	2010	bud, sweat & beers	World Stills Turns	Ben Kohn, James Devlin, Peter Kalleher, Tom Barnes	
Pixie Lott	2011	Young Foolish Happy	Love You To Death	Toby Gad, Pixie Lott	
Baptiste Giabiconi	2012	Oxygen	Sliding Doors	Ed Drewett, Pete Martin	
The Game, Elijah Blake	2012	Jesus Piece	Freedom	A. Thompson, C. MannD. Crawford, J. Taylor, S. Fenton	
Britney Spears	2013	Britney Jean	Work Bitch	Anthony Preston, Britney Spears, Otto Jettman, Sebastian Ingrosso, William Adams	
Avicii	2013	True	All You Need is Love	Ash Pournouri, Tim Bergling	
Girls' Generation	2014	I GOT A BOY (the 4th album)	Baby Maybe	Cutfather	
Alex & Sierra	2014	It's About Us	Here We Go	Julian Bunetta, Alex Kinsey, John Shanks, Sierra Deaton	
Alex & Sierra	2014	It's About Us	All for You	Alex Kinsey, John Ryan, Sierra Deaton	
Alex & Sierra	2014	It's About Us	Almost Home	Alex Kinsey, John Shanks, Sierra Deaton, Ali Tamposi, Sam Hollander	
Alex & Sierra	2014	It's About Us	Little Do You Know	Sierra Deaton, Toby Gad, Ali Tamposi	
Alex & Sierra	2014	It's About Us	Give Me Something	Alex Kinsey, Eddie Serrano, John Ryan, Sierra Deaton	
One Direction	2014	FOUR	No Control	John Ryan, Liam Payne, Louis Tomlinson, Julian Bunetta, Jamie Scott	
One Direction	2014	FOUR	Where Do Broken Hearts Go	Julian Bunetta, Ali Tamposi, Teddy Geiger, Harry Styles	
Grace Potter	2015	Midnight	Look What We've Become	Daniel Merriweather, Eric Valentine, Grace Potter, Matt Radosevich	
Lawson	2015	Lawson	We Are Kings	Andy Brown, Gary Go, John Shanks	
ARTY, Ray Dalton	2015	Glorious	Stronger	Artem Stolyarov, Ray Dalton, Hit-Man, Toby Gad	
The Mowgli's	2015	Kids In Love	Love Me Anyway	Joshua Hogan, Matt Radosevich	
The Mowgli's	2015	Kids In Love	You're Not Alone	Joshua Hogan, Matt Radosevich, Colin Dieden	
Classy	2015	X Factor Indonesia Part 2	Lebih Dari Kekasihku	Matt Rad	
Pentatonix	2015	Pentatonix (Deluxe Version)	Misbehavin'	Matt Radosevich, Mitch Grassi, Scott Hoying	
Empire Cast, Jamila Velazquez, Raquel Castro, Yani Marin	2016	Empire: Original Soundtrack, Season 2, Volume 2 (deluxe)	Crown	Empire Cast, Jamila Velazquez, Raquel Castro, Yani Marin	
Martin Garrix, Bebe Rexha	2016	non-album single	In the Name of Love	Martijn Garritsen, Matthew Radosevich, Stephen Philibin, Yael Nahar, Ilsey Juber	Peaked at no. 9 in the official UK chart
Tiësto, John Legend	2016	A Town Called Paradise (Japanese Special Addition)	Summer Nights	John Ryan, Sergio Popken, Tijs Verwest, Teddy Geiger	
Thirdstory	2016	Searching	G Train	Ben Lusher, Elliott Skinner, James Ho, Jon Levine, Richard Saunders	
Empire Cast, Becky G, Raquel Castro	2016	Do It	Empire: The Complete Season 2	Christopher J Baran, Jonathan Rotem	
Empire Cast, Jamila Velazquez, Raquel Castro, Yani Marin	2016	Mimosa	Empire: The Complete Season 2	Christopher J Baran, Jonathan Rotem, Teal Douville	
Zac Samuel, Moon Willis, Tayá	2016	Non-album Single	Never Letting Go	Henry Durham, Zac Samuel, Tom Aspaul, Benjamin Ross Ash, Julian Bunetta	
Hey Violet	2017	From The Outside	All We Ever Wanted	Casey Moreta, Miranda Miller, Nia Lovelis, Rena Lovelis, Julian Bunetta, Jacob Kasher Hindlin, Dallas Koehlke, Teddy Geiger	
Niall Horan	2017	Flicker	Slow Hands	Niall Horan, Alexander Izquierdo, John Ryan, Julian Bunetta, Tobias Jesso Jr.	"Slow Hands" charted within the top 10 in the charts of Australia, Ireland, New Zealand, and the United Kingdom.
Niall Horan	2017	Flicker	You and Me	Matt Radosevich, Niall Horan	
Niall Horan	2017	Flicker	Since We're Alone	Greg Kurstin, Dan Wilson, Niall Horan	
Niall Horan	2017	Flicker	Fire Away	Niall Horan, Julian Bunetta, John Ryan	
Niall Horan	2017	Flicker	Seeing Blind	Matt Radosevich, Niall Horan	
Lea Michele	2017	Places	Proud	John Shanks	
Samantha Jade	2017	non-album single	Nothing Without You	Jennifer Decilveo	
Black Saint	2017	non-album single	Never Did This Before	Jermaine Davis, Justin Osuji	
Thirdstory, Brasstracks	2018	For Those Who Know	Too Far Too Fast	Benjamin Lusher, Conor Szymanski, Elliott Skinner, Ivan Rosenberg, Richard Saunders	
John Legend	2018	A Legendary Christmas	No Place Like Home	John Stephens	
Thirdstory	2018	Cold Heart	Goodbye My Friend	Ben Lusher, Elliott Skinner, James Ho, Richard Saunders	
Thirdstory	2018	Cold Heart	Hit The Ceiling	Ben Lusher, Elliott Skinner, James Ho, Richard Saunders	
Thirdstory	2018	Cold Heart	On and On	Ben Lusher, Elliott Skinner, James Ho, Richard Saunders	
Thirdstory, Eryn Allen Kane	2018	Cold Heart	Still In Love	Ben Lusher, Bryan Kennedy, Elliott Skinner, Richard Saunders	
Thirdstory	2018	Cold Heart	Grows Old	Allison Ponthier, Ben Lusher, Elliott Skinner, James Ho, Richard Saunders	
Jamie Joseph	2018	Mutual Danger	Can't Seem to Change	Jamie Joseph Halligan	
Felix Jaehn, Marc E. Bassy, Gucci Mane	2018	I	Cool	Felix Jaehn, Jonas Jeberg, Radric Davis, Rick Markowitz, Micah Premnath, Scott Harris	
King Calaway	2019	Rivers	Rivers	Bruce Feelder, Peter John Reese Rycroft, Tom Walker, Peter Rycroft (Lostboy), Teddy Geiger	
Jez Dior	2019	Handle With Care	Cocaine	Chris Wallace, Jez Dior, Matt Radosevich, Ed Drewett	
Lost Kings, Wiz Khalifa, Social House	2019	Non-album single	Don't Kill My High	Cameron Thomaz, Charles Michael Anderson, Michael David Foster, Norris Shanholtz, Robert Abisi, Sabrina Louise Bernstein, Alexander Izquierdo,	
Liam Payne	2019	LP1	Both Ways	Liam Payne, Stephanie Jones, Andrew Haas, Ian Franzino	
In Real Life	2019	She Do	She Do	Ben Free, Brandon Arreaga, Conor Smith, Kendrick Nicholls, Sherwyn Nicholls, Ian Franzino, Jake Sinclair, John Ryan, Mike Sabath	
TIA RAY, Gallant	2019	non-album single	Trust Myself	GallantStint, TIA RAY, busbee	
Ship Wrek	2019	non-album single	Wait for You	Michael Matosic	
Max George	2019	non-album single	Better On Me	Cj Baran, Dan Goldberger, David Dalquist, J.R. Rotem, Jason Desrouleaux, Pat Morrissey,	
Black Saint, Sam Fischer	2019	non-album single	Everybody Wants You	Justin Osuji, ØJM, Sam Fischer, Autumn Rowe	
Irish Women In Harmony	2020	non-album single	Together at Christmas	Darren Emilio Lewis, Iyiola Babatunde Babalola, ØJM	
Lost + Found, Zac Samuel	2020	non-album single	Ghosted	Louis Schoorl, Ollie Marland, Tom Parker	
Lindsey Stirling, Kiesza	2020	"Azur Lane" Original Video Game Soundtrack	What You're Made Of	Gladius, Lindsey Stirling, Wendy Wang	
Fedde Le Grand, Ally Brooke	2020	non-album single	Gatekeeper	Allyson Brooke Hernandez, Fedde Le Grand, Josh Wilkinson, BullySongs	
Sam Sparro	2020	Boombox Eternal	Love Like That	Samuel Falson	
Niall Horan	2020	Heartbreak Weather	San Francisco	Julian Bunetta, Tobias Jesso Jr., Niall Horan	
Niall Horan	2020	Heartbreak Weather	Night to Meet Ya	Tobias Jesso Jr., Julian Bunetta, Scott Harris, Niall Horan	
Lawson	2020	Hell Yeah	Four	Conor O’Donohoe, Josh Wilkinson, OJM	
Erica-Cody	2021	Love & Light	Gratitude	Alex O’Keeffe, Anderson Egbadon, Erica-Cody, Kennedy Smith	
Cheat Codes, PRINCE$$ ROSIE	2021	HELLRAISERS, Part 2	Horror Movie	Beau Nox, Corey Sanders, Kevin Pederson, Matthew Russell Elifritz,	
CHIKA	2021	ONCE UPON A TIME	CINDERELLA Pt. 2	McClenney, CHIKA	
Lost + Found	2021	non-album single	Searching	OJM, Tom Parker, James Newman, Julian Bunetta	
Diana Ross	2021	Thank You	I Still Believe	Violet Skies, Autumn Rowe, Charlie McClean	
Sam Henshaw	2022	Untidy Soul	Enough	Matt Rad, Rahki Smith, Samm Henshaw	
MISIA	2022	Non-album single	Every Wish Deserves A Dream	Emily Bear, Lindy Robbins, Toby Gad	
Sofia Reyes	2023	MILAMORES	Luna	K Sotomayor, Sofía Reyes, Olivia Sebastianelli, Thom Bridges	
Zak Abel, Alan Walker	2023	Walkerworld	Endless Summer	Alan Walker, Fredrik Borch Olsen, Gunnar Greve, Marcus Arnbekk, Mats Lie Skåre, Oliver John Marland, Oliver Geoffrey, Zak Abel	
Kelly Clarkson	2023	Chemistry	did you know	Chris Kelly, Jesse Shatkin, Kelly Clarkson, John Ryan	
SWITCHDISCO	2023	Non-album single	VACANCY	Dan Creasy, John Nicholas Ealand Morgan, Nikos Kalogerias, William Martyn Morris Lansley	
Måneskin	2023	RUSH (ARE YOU COMING)	OFF MY FACE	Benjamin Berger, Damiano David, Ethan Torchio, Thomas Raggi, Victoria De Angelis, Nick Gale, Ryan Rabin	
The Inner Voices	2024	non-album single	Still In Love	Benjamin Lusher, Bryan Kennedy, Dylan Day, Elliott Skinner, Richard Saunders, Warren Felder	
Lucas Estrada, Social Club	2024	non-album single	Famous	Lucas Carlson Estrada, Oliver John Marland, Ollie Green	
Rita Ora, Gryffin	2024	PULSE	LAST OF US	Dan Griffith, Rita Ora, Sam Brennan, Tom Hollings, Rob Harvey, Sam Brennan	
Erica-Cody	2024	non-album single	Love Me Like I Do	Erica-Cody, Richey McCourt, Aimee Fitzpatrick	
Galantis	2024	non-album single	8 Days	Christian "Bloodshy" Karlsson, Henrik Jonback, Cathy Dennis, Christian Karlsson	
Ella Henderson	2024	Non-Album Single	Alibi (feat. Rudimental)	Artis Ivey Jr, Doug Rasheed, John MorganLarry Sanders, Stevie Wonder, Will Lansley, Maegan Cottone, Olivia Sebastianelli, Ella Henderson	
