= Never Be a Right Time =

Single by Professor Green

from the album At Your Inconvenience
- Released: 22 January 2012 (release history)
- Recorded: 2011
- Genre: Hip-hop
- Length: 3:20
- Label: Virgin
- Songwriter(s): Stephen Manderson
- Producer(s): Alex 'Cores' Hayes

Professor Green singles chronology
| "Read All About It" (2011) | "Never Be a Right Time" (2012) | "Stylechanger" (2012) |

Ed Drewett singles chronology
| "Champagne Lemonade" (2010) | "Never Be a Right Time" (2012) |

"Never Be a Right Time" is a song by British rapper Professor Green which features uncredited vocals from British singer/songwriter Ed Drewett. The track served as the second single from Professor Green's second studio album, At Your Inconvenience and was released as a digital download in the United Kingdom on 22 January 2012.

== Music video ==
A music video to accompany the release of "Never Be a Right Time" was first released onto YouTube on 24 November 2011 at a total length of three minutes and twenty seconds. The video was filmed on the streets of East London.

== Track listing ==
Promotional CD single
| No. | Title | Length |
|---|---|---|
| 1. | "Never Be a Right Time" (Radio Version) | 3:33 |
| 2. | "Never Be a Right Time" (Instrumental) | 3:20 |

Digital download
| No. | Title | Length |
|---|---|---|
| 1. | "Never Be a Right Time" | 3:20 |
| 2. | "Never Be a Right Time" (Document One Remix) | 6:28 |
| 3. | "Never Be a Right Time" (Document One Instrumental) | 6:28 |
| 4. | "Never Be a Right Time" (Drums of London Remix) | 3:41 |
| 5. | "Never Be a Right Time" (Drums of London Dub) | 4:59 |
| 6. | "How Many Moons" (Remix) (featuring Dream Mclean and Rinse) | 7:05 |

== Chart performance ==
| Chart (2011) | Peak position |
|---|---|
| Ireland (IRMA) | 49 |
| UK Hip Hop/R&B (OCC) | 11 |
| UK Singles (OCC) | 35 |

== Release history ==
| Region | Date | Format | Label |
|---|---|---|---|
| United Kingdom | 22 January 2012 | Digital download | Virgin Records |
