= German Whip =

Single by Meridian Dan featuring Big H and Jme

from the album I Am London
- Released: 13 April 2014
- Genre: Grime
- Length: 3:17
- Label: PMR Records; Virgin EMI Records; Universal Music UK
- Songwriter(s): Lawrence London; Kofi Kouassi; Jamie Adenuga; Adrian Harris
- Producer(s): The HeavyTrackerz

Meridian Dan singles chronology
"German Whip" (2014)	"One Two Drinks" (2014)

Big H singles chronology
"OMG (H is Back)" (2013)	"German Whip" (2014)

Jme singles chronology
"Taking Over? (It Ain't Working)" (2014)	"German Whip" (2014)	"That's Not Me" (2014)

"German Whip" is the debut single by grime artist Meridian Dan, released as the lead single from his forthcoming debut album, I Am London. The song features vocals from rappers Big H and Jme, and was produced by The HeavyTrackerz, who have been credited with production for many other chart-successful songs. The song entered the UK Singles Chart on 20 May 2014 at number 13, which remains its highest charting position.

== Background and release ==
The song was released on 13 April 2014, having achieved nationwide recognition beforehand. The song was added to BBC Radio 1Xtra's A-list and received support from BBC Radio 1, Kiss FM and Capital Radio.

The song is a panegyric on the subject of driving high-quality German precision engineered motor cars with blacked out windows whilst leaning back. The phrase "whip" was used after various rappers noticed that the Mercedes-Benz logo resembled a steering wheel, which used to be called a whip.

== Music video ==
The song has two music videos. The first was released in 2013, directed by Jay Parpworth and produced by SB.TV, gaining 10.4 million views and was shown nationwide via all major TV channels such as MTV and The Box. The second was released six months later and was produced by Vevo, and features an array of German cars.

== Critical reception ==
Critical reception has generally been positive. Swarve Men Magazine called the song "awesomely catchy". Robert Foster of Bankholidaycomes.com said the song was a "little nugget of grime fun". In addition, Stagedoor.fm said that heaven would be "hot weather, coupled with the windows down, plus [the Skepta, Professor Green, Bossman Birdie & Rizzle Kicks] remix". Robin Murray of Clashmusic.com commended Meridian Dan's "untamed vocal", with him "electrifying the studio and riding on top of a ridiculous beat". Complex magazine ranked the song second on their list of "Grime's Most Impatcful Songs of the 2010s", calling it an "anthem to kickstart the [grime] buzz - most importantly bringing grime back to commercial daytime radio".

== Legacy ==
The song has been credited with steering grime's unexpected comeback. In addition, T-shirt Party created a T-shirt in homage to the song, which contains Audi, BMW, Mercedes-Benz, Porsche and Volkswagen logos.

== Track listing ==
Digital download – single
No.	Title	Length
1.	"German Whip" (featuring Big H and Jme)	3:16

Digital download – EP
No.	Title	Length
1.	"German Whip" (Remix) (featuring Skepta, Professor Green, Bossman Birdie and Rizzle Kicks)	3:58
2.	"German Whip" (Two Inch Punch Remix) (featuring Big H and JME)	3:29
3.	"German Whip" (True Tiger Remix) (featuring Big H and JME)	3:32
4.	"German Whip" (Wideboys Remix) (featuring Big H and JME)	6:18
