= Meridian Dan =

English rapper

Meridian Dan (born Daniel Lawrence London) is a grime MC from Tottenham, North London. He is best known for his 2014 single "German Whip", and is a former member of seminal grime crews Meridian and Bloodline.

== Background ==
Lawrence, who is of Guyanese descent, first started MCing at age 10, having had music around him throughout his childhood and being inspired by hip-hop and reggae. Jme and Big H, who both feature on "German Whip", were both childhood friends.

Meridian Dan was a peripheral member of Meridian Crew along with President T, Skepta, Jme, Big H, Bossman Birdie and Paper Pabs in the early noughties. During his time in the group he made regular appearances on the crew's show on pirate radio station Heat FM show and later on Déjà Vu FM. He featured on Skepta's "Private Caller" single in 2005. In 2005, Meridian Dan took a hiatus from music after Meridian Crew disbanded - with other crew members going on to form Boy Better Know and Bloodline Family - to pursue other interests and careers. During this time, he worked as a boxer, a plasterer, an electrician, a steel erector, and a welder. Having formerly been a steward at the club, he is a supporter of Tottenham Hotspur. In a 2014 interview, Meridian Dan said that his hiatus was because he wasn't getting paid for his music and had outside stresses to attend to.

He returned to making music in 2010 recording songs and making pirate radio appearances with other members of Bloodline Family. In 2013 he recorded German Whip featuring Big H of Bloodline and Jme of Boy Better Know, after the song achieved underground success Meridian Dan was signed to PMR who gave the song a commercial release in 2014. German Whip charted at #13 on the UK Singles Chart. This led the London Evening Standard to quip that his jump to stardom must have been "one of the slowest breakthroughs in music".

== Music ==
In August 2014, the song "One Two Drinks" was announced as the next single from his forthcoming debut album I Am London which is set to be released on PMR. In mid 2015, he also released single "The Bits" which was also released under PMR.

== Awards ==
In September 2014, Meridian Dan received three nominations for awards in 'Mobo Best Grime', 'Best Song' and 'Best Newcomer'.

== Discography ==
=== Singles ===
==== As lead artist ====
| Title | Year | Peak chart positions | Album |
| Title | Year | UK | Album |
|---|---|---|---|
| "German Whip" | 2014 | 13 | I Am London |
| "One Two Drinks" | 2014 | — | I Am London |
