= Relentless (drink) =

Energy drink

- A can of Relentless (standard size)
- Type: Energy drink
- Manufacturer: Monster Beverage Corporation
- Origin: United Kingdom
- Introduced: February 2006; 20 years ago
- Variants: Origin (Original), Cherry, Fruit Punch, Guava, White Citrus
- Website: http://www.relentlessenergy.com/

Relentless is the brand name of an energy drink created in February 2006 by the Coca-Cola Company, but as of June 2015 is owned by Monster Beverage Corporation.

== Overview ==
Relentless is sold in 500 ml and 355 ml cans. It is marketed as being produced for "those with need of strong stimulation". The product's label includes a caution stating that Relentless is not suitable for children, pregnant women or those sensitive to caffeine. Relentless is marketed to provide continuing energy with the slogan of "No Half Measures" (a reference to the can size, which is twice that of a standard 250 ml can of Red Bull). With the gradual release of new flavours, the original flavour was renamed "Origin".

In the year ending 2010, sales of the product in the UK increased by 28 percent.

Relentless was introduced to the New Zealand market in May 2008 by Coca-Cola Amatil. It is only available in a 440 ml can. In April 2009, CCA replaced the Relentless drink range with the Mother Energy Drink range, which is imported from Australia.

In 2011, the drink was the subject of court proceedings for breach of trademark by Relentless Records.

== Artwork and packaging ==
The original Relentless logo and original packaging were designed by Rebecca Wright.

The Relentless brand magazine This Is the Order (commissioned by Erasmus Partners in 2008) was created and designed by Rebecca Wright in collaboration with The Church of London Publishing.

Each can used to contain an extract of poetry, taken from the works of poets including John Milton, Lord Byron, William Wordsworth, Edgar Allan Poe, William Ernest Henley, Albrecht Dürer and Percy Bysshe Shelley.

== Filmmaking ==
Relentless Energy has produced two feature-length documentary films which focus on the area of extreme sports. The first, which was released in May 2009, called Powers of Three, is a surf documentary set in Ireland and was available to watch for free on the Relentless Website. The follow-up films, Lives of the Artists and Lives of the Artists II: Follow Me Down, were released in December 2009 and March 2010, respectively.

In 2012, Relentless produced a commercial associating car vandalism with drinking the product, with the assistance of the rapper Professor Green, who walked over cars, to the anger of their drivers.

== Nutritional information ==
Ingredients: Carbonated water, sugar, citric acid, taurine (0.4%), glucuronolactone (0.24%), acidity regulator (E331), colour (caramel E150d and E104), flavourings, preservative (E202, E211), caffeine, inositol, vitamins (niacin, pantothenic acid, B_{3}, B_{6}, B_{12}), and guarana.

Relentless contains 32 mg of Caffeine per 100 mL, in a standard can size of 500 mL (16.9 US fl oz), or about 160 mg of Caffeine in total.

== Varieties ==
Name	Year launched	Discontinued	Notes	Ref.
Relentless Origin	2006	N/A	The original variety of the drink.	
Rentless Orange	2007	2015	An orange-flavoured variety. It was introduced as Rentless Inferno in 2007 and renamed to its final name in 2012. It was replaced with a Mango variety in 2015.	
Relentless Tropical Juiced	2008	2010's	A Tropical fruit variant containing 50% fruit juice. It was originally introduced as Relentless Juiced Energy in 2008, and was renamed to Relentless Immortus in 2011, before gaining its final name in 2012.	
Relentless Berry Juiced	2009	2014	A Strawberry/Raspberry/Blackcurrant variant containing 50% fruit juice. It was originally introduced as Relentless Juiced Energy Berry Flavour in 2009, and was renamed to Relentless Devotion in 2011, before gaining its final name in 2012. It was replaced with the Cherry flavour in 2014.	
Relentless Energy Shot	2009	Early-2010's	A 50ml Energy shot, containing over 80 mg of caffeine.	
Relentless Zero	2011	Early-2020's	A Sugar-free version of the standard Relentless Origin, containing 20 calories per serving. It was initially introduced as Relentless Libertus in 2011, renamed as Relentless Sugar Free in 2012, Relentless Ultra Origin in 2014, and then its final name in 2016.	
Relentless Apple Kiwi	2012	Late-2010's	An Apple and Kiwi fruit flavoured variety. It was introduced as Relentless Apple & Kiwi before being renamed.	
Relentless Lemon Iced	2013	Early 2020's	A Lemonade variant.	
Relentless Cherry	2014	N/A	A Cherry-flavoured variety, introduced as part of a rebranding, replacing Berry Juiced.	
Relentless Mango Ultra	2015	2010's	A sugar-free Mango-flavoured variety.	
Relentless Passion Punch	2016	Mid-2020's	A Passionfruit-flavoured variety, introduced as part of another relaunch.	
Relentless Mango Ultra	2018	2020's	A Mango-flavoured variety.	
Relentless Sour Twist	2019	2020's	A Sour variant.	
Relentless Zero Sugar Peach	2022	2025	A sugar-free Peach-flavoured variety.	
Relentless Zero Sugar Raspberry	2022	2025	A sugar-free Raspberry-flavoured variety.	
Relentless Zero Sugar Watermelon	2023	2025	A sugar-free Watermelon-flavoured variety.	
Relentless Fruit Punch	2024	N/A	A Fruit Punch-flavoured variety.	
Relentless Guava	2025	N/A	A Guava-flavoured variety.	
Relentless White Citrus	2026	N/A	A Zesty White Citrus flavoured variety.	

== Sponsorship ==
Relentless sponsors various teams and athletes from the core sports in the UK.

In October 2006, Relentless teamed up with Motorcross Team Rob Hooper's Suzuki to create "Relentless Suzuki." Lewis Gregory, Jamie Law and Alex Snow are the riders for the team, which will compete in all the major UK and European MX2 events.

Relentless also teamed up with TAS Suzuki, a Northern Ireland-based motorcycle road racing team, and the team is now known as "Relentless Suzuki by TAS Racing". The team fields bikes in the British Superbike Championship, with riders Michael Laverty in the Superbike class and Ian Lowry in the Supersport class (which was won by Laverty in 2007 on the Relentless Suzuki). Cameron Donald and Guy Martin race at International road racing events, such as the Isle of Man TT, North West 200, and Ulster Grand Prix, for the team. Donald and Anstey recorded a 1 – 2 for the team in the first race of the 2008 TT, the Dainese Superbike Race. Relentless was the title sponsor of Faithless frontman Maxi Jazz in 2006 during his Porsche Carrera Cup Great Britain campaign.

Also in 2008, Relentless sponsored Formula Palmer Audi driver Emma Selway.

Mike & Andrew Jordan also had Relentless sponsorship on their British Touring Car Championship Honda Integras.

Relentless was a main sponsor of the Reading and Leeds festivals in 2007. There were large stalls shaped like giant Relentless cans solely dedicated to selling the drink. There were also copious flags and signs dotted around the festival sites.

Relentless has renewed the sponsorship of the Leeds and Reading festivals for 2008 after Carling discontinued their sponsorship of the music festival.

In January 2009, Relentless began sponsoring the annual Kerrang! Tour put together by British music magazine Kerrang!.

In 2009, Relentless was the principal sponsor of the Newquay Boardmasters festival.

Relentless is the primary sponsor of Uniwake, the UK's national organisation for inter-university wakeboarding events. The sponsorship began in May 2009 and continues to the present day. This includes the BUCS Student Wakeboarding Championships held in June each year at Sheffield Cable Waterski in Sheffield.

In 2010, Relentless was the title sponsor of Team Bath Racing the Formula Student Team from Bath University.

Relentless was the principal sponsor of the Wakestock music and wakeboarding festival in Abersoch, North Wales, with the festival, therefore, being branded Relentless Wakestock. But has now lost the event contract. Now, no Relentless branding appears on the Wakestock website.

Relentless is also a sponsor of the "Bundesligaachter Mülheim an der Ruhr" a German rowing eight competing in the "1. Ruder Bundesliga", and its one sponsor of the Strakka Racing since 2009 in Endurance Racing.

Since 18 July 2013, Relentless has been the main sponsor of the FC St. Pauli professional men's football team in Hamburg, Germany.
