= Remedy (Professor Green song) =

Single by Professor Green featuring Ruth Anne

from the album At Your Inconvenience
- Released: 14 May 2012
- Recorded: 2011
- Genre: Hip hop; electropop; UK garage; breakbeat
- Length: 3:15 (Album Version); 3:17 (Single Version)
- Label: Virgin
- Songwriters: Stephen Manderson; Mustafa Omar; James Murray; Ruth-Anne Cunningham
- Producers: Mojam; TMS (additional)

Professor Green singles chronology
"Stylechanger" (2012)	"Remedy" (2012)	"Dreamers" (2012)

Ruth-Anne Cunningham singles chronology
"Beautiful World" (2011)	"Remedy" (2012)	"Heart Attack" (2013)

"Remedy" is a song by British rapper Professor Green, taken from his second studio album, At Your Inconvenience. The track features vocals from Irish singer-songwriter – Ruth-Anne Cunningham. The track serves as the album's third official single, and was released as a digital download in the United Kingdom on 14 May 2012. For its single release, the track has been heavily remixed by TMS, completely changing the backing instrumental, for a heavier, club sound.

== Music video ==
A music video to accompany the release of "Taco on the floor" premiered on YouTube on 27 April 2012. The video lasts a total length of 3 minutes and 17 seconds, and shows Green and his friends on a night out in East London. BBC Breakfast host Bill Turnbull appears in a cameo near the end of the video. Professor Green's girlfriend is played by current UFC ring girl – Carly Baker, while his real-life girlfriend, Millie Mackintosh from Made in Chelsea as also appears in the video. Page Three Idol 2011 winners Lucy Collett, Rizzle Kicks, Dream McLean and Rinse also appear in the video. Charlotte from the E4 reality series – Dirty Sexy Things, also appeared on numerous occasions.

== Live performances ==
Green promoted the release of the single with a live performance on The Voice of Ireland on 22 April 2012.

On 5 May 2012, "Remedy" was filmed live at Brixton Academy using Mativision cameras. This technology enables viewers to be able to view the performance from 6 different angles and in 360 degrees.

== Track listing ==
Promotional CD single
No.	Title	Length
1.	"Remedy" (Radio Mix)	3:17
2.	"Remedy" (Instrumental)	3:18

Digital download
No.	Title	Length
1.	"Remedy" (Wilkinson Remix)	4:59
2.	"Remedy" (ILS Remix)	6:02
3.	"Remedy" (Huxley's Dub)	6:24
4.	"Remedy" (Wilkinson Remix Instrumental)	4:59

== Chart performance ==
Chart (2012)	Peak position
Ireland (IRMA)	26
Scotland Singles (OCC)	30
UK Hip Hop/R&B (OCC)	7
UK Singles (OCC)	18

== Certifications ==
Region	Certification	Certified units/sales
United Kingdom (BPI)	Silver	200,000^{‡}
^{‡} Sales+streaming figures based on certification alone.

== Release history ==
Region	Date	Format	Label
United Kingdom	14 May 2012	Digital download	Virgin Records
Germany	3 June 2012	Digital download	Virgin Records
