= At Your Inconvenience =

Studio album by Professor Green
- Released: 28 October 2011
- Recorded: 2010–2011
- Studios: The Spaceship; Engine Room Audio; The Music Shed; Strongroom; CNK Studios; EMI Studios; Angel Studios; Abbey Road Studios; The Sample Factory
- Genres: British hip-hop; UK garage; R&B
- Length: 65:26
- Label: Virgin
- Producers: Alex 'Cores' Hayes; 16bit; DJ Khalil; TMS; iSHi; Eric Hudson; Camo & Krooked; Mojam; Naughty Boy

Professor Green chronology
Alive Till I'm Dead (2010)	At Your Inconvenience (2011)	Growing Up in Public (2014)

Singles from At Your Inconvenience
- 1. "Read All About It" Released: 21 October 2011; 2. "Never Be a Right Time" Released: 22 January 2012; 3. "Remedy" Released: 14 May 2012; 4. "Avalon" Released: 16 September 2012

At Your Inconvenience is the second studio album by British rapper Professor Green, released on 28 October 2011. "At Your Inconvenience" was released as a promotional single on 26 July. The first official single "Read All About It" was released on 21 September 2011. Some guests from his debut album appear on the album, including Ed Drewett, Fink and Emeli Sandé; new guests include Slaughterhouse and Bad Meets Evil member Royce da 5'9", Kobe, Luciana, Ruth Anne, Sierra Kusterbeck and Haydon. Upper Clapton Dance originally featured on Green's debut mixtape Lecture #1. As of 6 September 2014, the album has sold 280,000 copies in the UK.

== Background ==
The album's general theme is different, in that it is more emotional, to Professor Green's previous album; he had a difficult upbringing with a hard relationship with his parents. His father committed suicide in 2008 and it heavily affected him. The album, thus, is generally more emotional than his previous album, Alive Till I'm Dead, which covered more humorous themes. Ed Drewett and Emeli Sandé, who had previously worked on Alive Till I'm Dead, were featured on the album.

== Singles ==
- "At Your Inconvenience" was released as the album's first promotional single on 26 July 2011. It was released via promotional single and digital download, and a music video was released in support of the track. The video features Green in various alter egos, performing the song in and around a bar. The track peaked at number 97 on the UK Singles Chart.
- "Read All About It" was released as the album's first official single on 23 October 2011. The tracks features vocals from Emeli Sandé. On 5 September 2011, BBC Radio 1Xtra presenter MistaJam debuted the single, and gave it its first radio airplay. In promotion of the single, Green and Sande performed the song live on The X Factor results show on 23 October 2011. It peaked at number one on the UK Singles Chart.
- "Never Be a Right Time" was released as the album's second official single on 22 January 2012. The single features guest vocals from Ed Drewett. A music video was created for the track, however, Drewett does not appear in the video. The video features Green agonising over his relationship with a girl. The track peaked at number 35 on the UK Singles Chart.
- "How Many Moons" was released as the album's second promotional single on 21 April 2012, in support of the fifth annual Record Store Day. The song is produced by Austrian duo Camo & Krooked. The remix (released as the single) features guest vocals from Dream Mclean and Rinse. A lyric video was created for the track, however, no official music video was filmed. The track was ineligible to chart, as only 1000 copies of the single were produced.
- "Remedy" was released as the album's third official single on 3 June 2012. The single features guest vocals from Ruth-Anne Cunningham. The song was remixed for its release as a single. The track reached number 18 on the UK Singles Chart. In support of the single, Green prepared and released his own brand of beer, entitled "Professor Green's Remedy".
- "Avalon" was released as the album's fourth official single on 16 September 2012. The single features guest vocals from Sierra Kusterbeck. The song was once again remixed for its release as a single. A music video for the track was filmed during the first week of July. Kusterbeck made a guest appearance in the video.

== Reception ==
Professional ratings
Aggregate scores
Source	Rating
AnyDecentMusic?	4.9/10
Metacritic	54/100
Review scores
Source	Rating
The Daily Telegraph	1/5 stars
Digital Spy	4/5 stars
The Evening Standard	2/5 stars
The Guardian	3/5 stars
The Independent	2/5 stars
The Irish Times	3/5 stars
MusicOMH	2/5 stars
NME	2.5/5 stars
RapReviews	7/10
RWD	4/5 stars

According to the review aggregator Metacritic, At Your Inconvenience received "mixed or average reviews" based on a weighted average score of 54 out of 100 from 10 critic scores. RWD Magazine gave the album 4/5 stars and stated "Introspective and reflective, this borders on emo-rap on occasions, while retaining edginess on the sonic side." MTV UK gave the album a positive review stating "From hip-hop, to UK garage influences, this slick LP really does have it all." The Guardian's Charlotte Richardson Andrews awarded the album 3/5 stars, saying "It's difficult to reconcile Green's more crass verses with his sentimental numbers; Astronaut's tale of innocent rape victim turned junkie sits uncomfortably next to all the phallus jokes and Eminem-style sadism of songs such as 'Into the Ground'. It's a heavy, ambivalent confessional, but Green's precocious personality and distinctive flow manage to keep it fired up." Jesal Padania of RapReviews gave the record a 7/10, praising the various production choices and Green's lyrical content for showing an update in variety and character consistency, despite some off-kilter delivery and a feeling of lyrical depth being held back, concluding that it "might leave you wanting a little bit more of what he's potentially best at. But make no mistake, it's an album that displays growth, maturity and improvement in almost every respect – he's certainly becoming a versatile and engaging artist."

Andy Gill of The Independent was less positive, saying "Having managed to parlay an association with Lily Allen into the semblance of a career, Professor Green punches above his weight on his second album", before describing Green's delivery as "too Estuary-Eminem, scattershot hip-hop asperity snarled out with a mockney menace that is too secondhand to be effective". The Evening Standard said "At his best, as on the vitriolic 'Read All About It', he can still sound like the English Eminem. When the acoustic guitars come out, though, he's closer to Just Jack." The BBC were also unimpressed, with contributor Gary Mulholland saying that Green is basically just saying "Please let me on The X Factor… I promise I won't swear!" and that you are left "frankly, bemused and, increasingly, very, very bored." The Evening Standard summed up the album by saying "The good news is that if fame really is so tough Manderson won't have to suffer for long: another album like this and nobody will be listening." Uncut gave the album 2 out of 5 stars, summing it up as "rather tiring." Perhaps the most damning review of all, though, was The Daily Telegraph's 1 out of 5, with writer James Lachno claiming that "his rhymes are too often lewd brags or boneheaded non sequiturs." Any Decent Music, the online review aggregator, rated the album overall 4.9 out of 10.

Padania argued that UK music critics are not familiar with the construction and structure of hip-hop albums, and said that when approaching these types of records, "you have to know precisely what to analyse, and what the MC is trying to achieve."

== Track listing ==
At Your Inconvenience track listing
No.	Title	Writer(s)	Producer(s)	Length
1.	"At Your Inconvenience"	Stephen Manderson, Eddie Jeffrys, Jason Morrison	16bit	3:33
2.	"D.P.M.O"	Manderson, Andrew "Broadway" Williams, Jared Scharff	Youngboyz and Jared "Blake" Scharff	3:58
3.	"Read All About It" (featuring Emeli Sandé)	Manderson, Emeli Sandé, Tom Barnes, Peter Kelleher, Ben Kohn, Iain James	TMS, Eshraque "iSHi" Mughal	3:55
4.	"Trouble" (featuring Luciana)	Manderson, Barnes, Kelleher, Kohn, Luciana Caporaso, Nick Clow	TMS	3:39
5.	"Spinning Out" (featuring Fink)	Manderson, Charles Thompson, Alex 'Cores' Hayes	Alex 'Cores' Hayes	4:15
6.	"Remedy" (featuring Ruth Anne)	Manderson, James Murray, Mustafa Omar, Lee Bailey, Ruth-Anne Cunningham	Mojam	3:15
7.	"How Many Moons"	Manderson, Reinhard Rietsch, Markus Wagner	Camo & Krooked	4:04
8.	"Avalon" (featuring Sierra Kusterbeck)	Manderson, Murray, Omar, Sandé	Mojam	4:44
9.	"Astronaut"	Manderson, Sandé, Shahid Khan, Ludovico Einaudi, Hayes	Alex 'Cores' Hayes, Naughty Boy	3:54
10.	"Doll"	Manderson, Andrew Clifton, Eric Hudson	Eric Hudson, Andrew Clifton	4:09
11.	"Never Be a Right Time" (featuring Ed Drewett)	Manderson, Ed Drewett, Hayes	Alex 'Cores' Hayes	3:20
12.	"Today I Cried"	Manderson, Hayes	Alex 'Cores' Hayes	5:45
13.	"Nightmares" (featuring Royce da 5'9" and Kobe)	Manderson, Khalil Abdul Rahman, Danny Tannenbaum	DJ Khalil	3:39
14.	"Forever Falling" (featuring Haydon)	Manderson, Hanni Ibrahim, Lee Bailey	Sunny Productions	5:05
15.	"Into the Ground"	Manderson, Hayes	Alex 'Cores' Hayes	4:26
16.	"D.P.M.O" (featuring Orelsan) / "Upper Clapton Dance" (featuring Chynaman and Cores; hidden track)	Manderson, Andrew "Broadway" Williams, Jared Scharff / Manderson, Hayes, Derry "Chynaman" Thompson	Youngboyz and Jared "Blake" Scharff / Alex 'Cores' Hayes	7:14

iTunes Store bonus tracks
No.	Title	Writer(s)	Producer(s)	Length
17.	"Coming to Get Me"	Manderson, Hayes	Alex "Cores" Hayes	3:28
18.	"At Your Inconvienience" (Clean version)	Manderson, Jeffrys, Morrison	16bit	3:30

Italian edition bonus track
No.	Title	Writer(s)	Producer(s)	Length
17.	"Read All About It (Tutto Quello Che Devi Sapere)" (featuring Dolcenera)	Manderson, Emeli Sandé, Tom Barnes, Peter Kelleher, Ben Kohn, Iain James	TMS	3:54

Deluxe edition bonus DVD
No.	Title	Length
1.	"Up Close and Personal" (Interview)
2.	"Read All About It" (Music video and Behind the Scenes)
3.	"At Your Inconvinience" (Music video and Behind the Scenes)
4.	"Photoshoot" (Behind the Scenes)

== Personnel ==
Musicians

- Jared "Blake" Scharff – guitar, synths (track 2)
- Chris Shooroi – guitar (track 3)
- Ben Kohn – guitar (track 3), bass (track 4)
- Tim Thornton – guitar (track 5)
- Guy Whittaker – bass (track 5)
- James Murray – guitar (track 8)
- Edward Hayes – bridge guitar (track 2), guitars (tracks 11, 12, 14, 15)
- Pete Kelleher – bass, keyboards (track 4)
- Luke Juby – piano, strings (track 8)
- Carl Hudson – piano (track 9)
- Neil Cowley – piano (track 9)
- Danny Keyz – keyboards (track 13)
- Heritage Orchestra – strings (tracks 3, 11, 12, 14)
- Jules Buckley – strings arrangement (tracks 3, 11, 12, 14)
- Tim Hutton – brass (track 15)
- DJ IQ – cuts (tracks 13, 15)

Production

- Ken Duro Ifill – mixing (tracks 1–15)
- Steve Fitzmaurice – mixing (track 16)
- Jason Cox – mixing (track 17)
- Chris Athens – mastering (tracks 1–15)
- Jeremy Cooper – mastering (tracks 16, 17)

Artwork

- Henrik Knudsen – photography
- Traffic – design

== Charts ==
=== Weekly charts ===
Weekly chart performance for At Your Inconvenience
Chart (2011)	Peak position
Irish Albums (IRMA)	13
Scottish Albums (Official Charts)	5
UK Albums (Official Charts)	3
UK R&B Albums (Official Charts)	1

=== Year-end charts ===
2011 year-end chart performance for At Your Inconvenience
Chart (2011)	Position
UK Albums (OCC)	91

2012 year-end chart performance for At Your Inconvenience
Chart (2012)	Position
UK Albums (OCC)	110

== Certifications ==
Certifications for At Your Inconvenience
Region	Certification	Certified units/sales
United Kingdom (BPI)	Gold	100,000^{^}
Summaries
^{^} Shipments figures based on certification alone.

== Release history ==
Release history and formats for At Your Inconvenience
Country	Release date	Format(s)	Ref.
Ireland	28 October 2011	Digital download	
United Kingdom	31 October 2011	CD, digital download	
