= Professor Green =

English rapper and songwriter (born 1983)

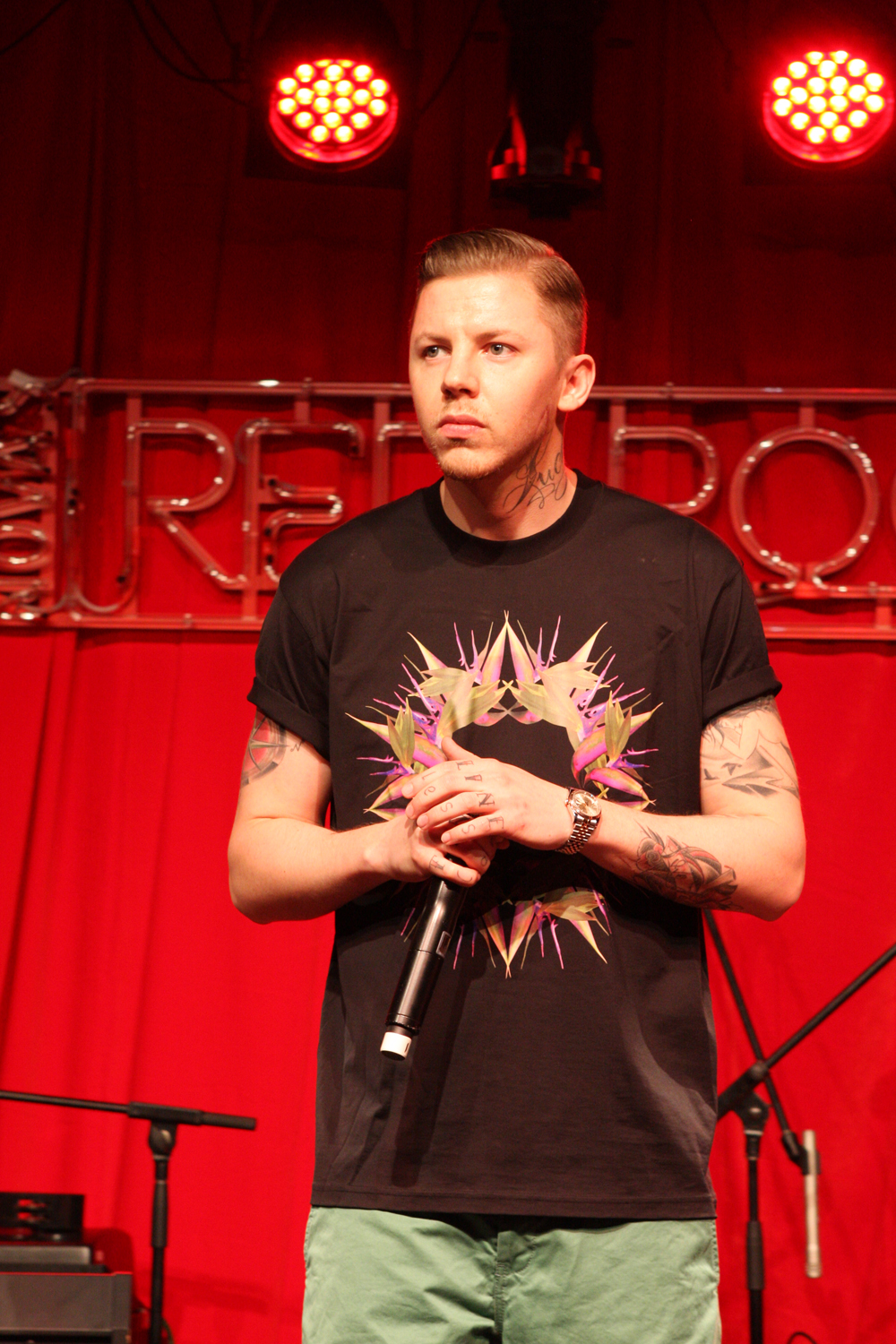
- Stephen Manderson in 2012
- Born: Stephen Paul Manderson; 27 November 1983 (age 42); Clapton, London, England
- Occupations: Rapper; singer; songwriter; actor; television personality; mental health activist
- Spouse: Millie Mackintosh (m. 2013; div. 2016)
- Children: 1
- Musical career
- Genres: Hip hop; grime; electronica
- Instrument: Vocals
- Years active: 2005–present
- Labels: Virgin (2010–2015); Relentless (2016–2020); Cooking Vinyl (2021–2023); Gang Green Records (2019–present)
- Website: professorgreen.co.uk

Stephen Paul Manderson (born 27 November 1983), better known by his stage name Professor Green or simply Pro Green, is an English rapper, singer, songwriter, actor, television personality and mental health activist from London.

Growing up on a council estate in Clapton, east London, Green went on to become a multi-platinum artist, with 3.5 million combined sales in the UK. He is the former co-host of Lip Sync Battle UK on Channel 5. His autobiography featured on the Times bestseller list, and he is a supporter of the suicide prevention charity CALM.

== Early life ==
Manderson's mother gave birth to him when she was 16 years old, splitting with the boy's father shortly after. At six weeks old he required a pyloromyotomy operation to his stomach. Manderson was raised by his grandmother, great-grandmother and uncles in a two bedroom flat on the Northwold housing estate in Upper Clapton, Hackney, London, in a home which he describes as chaotic. Green expressed how the passing of his great-grandmother Edie when he was 13 had a great impact.

He sold cannabis as a youngster and smoked it on a daily basis between the ages of 16 and 24. Although he was a bright student and dreamed of being a lawyer, he suffered from depression at the loss of his parents and he left Stoke Newington School in Clissold Road without any qualifications.

When Green was 24 years old his father died by suicide. Green went to identify the corpse in the morgue. He stopped using any drugs from that point to allow himself to process the death fully.

== Career ==
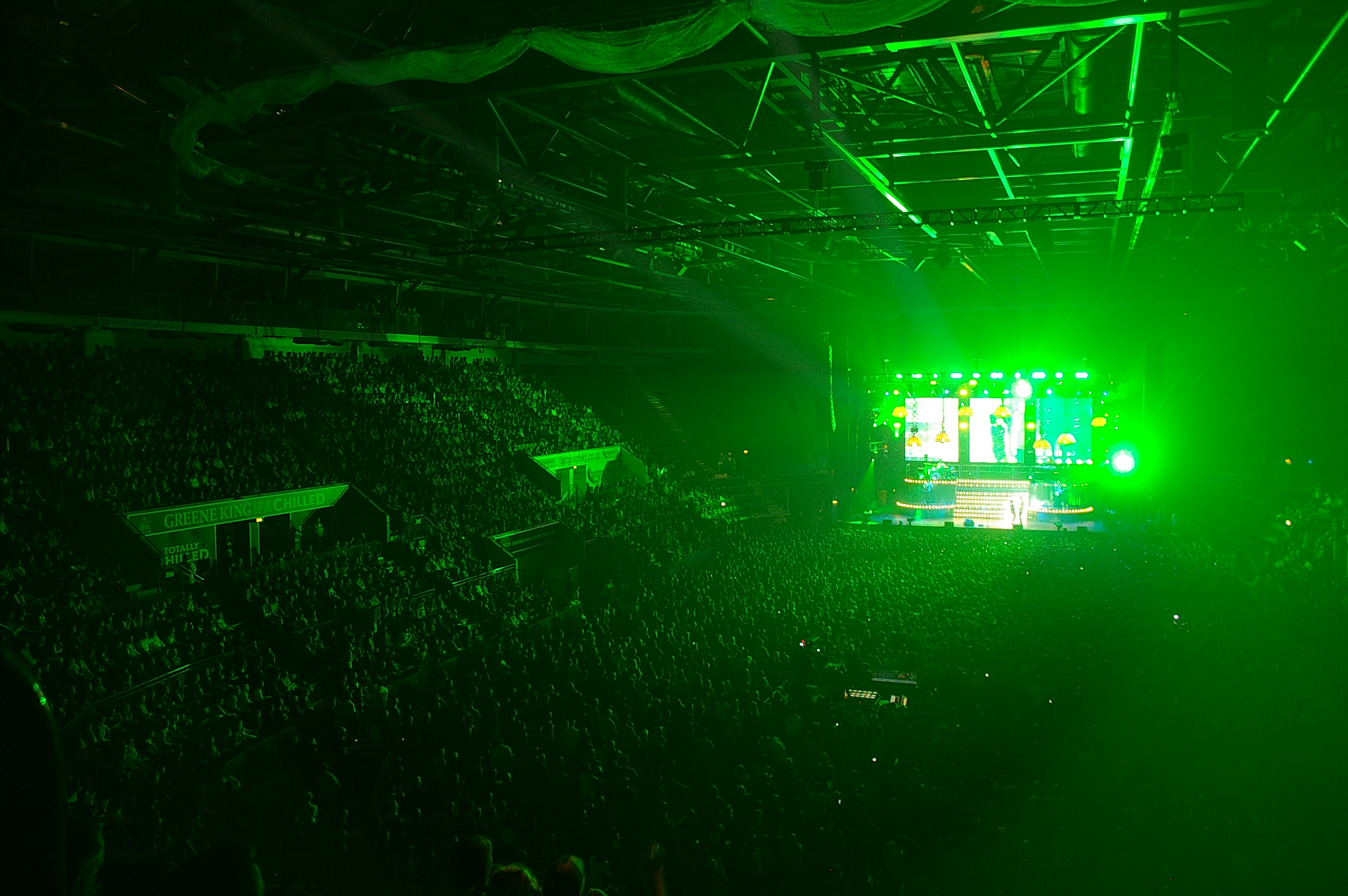
Professor Green performed as a special guest of Lily Allen in 2009.

=== 2006–2011: Early beginnings and Alive Till I'm Dead ===
In 2006, Green released his first mixtape, Lecture #1. He won the inaugural JumpOff MySpace £50,000 battle rap tournament in 2008.

After touring with Lily Allen, Green was signed to Virgin Records. In 2010, Green released his debut album, Alive Till I'm Dead. His first pop single, "I Need You Tonight", peaked at number 3 in the UK, and number 15 in Ireland, and was certified silver in the United Kingdom.

He released his second single 'Just Be Good to Green', in 2010 in the UK, which featured British singer Lily Allen. It became a top 5 hit in the UK, a top 20 hit in Ireland and on the European Hot 100 Singles. It also peaked at #32 in New Zealand and #49 in Australia. His album was released a week later, and peaked at #2 in the UK and #18 in Ireland. He released Monster on 3 October 2010 as the third single from the album, featuring UK rapper Example (Elliot Gleave). The single became a top 30 hit on the UK Singles Chart, and the album has been certificated Platinum with sales of over 300,000 in the United Kingdom.

In 2010 Green joined Lily Allen on stage at Wembley Stadium whilst supporting Muse, to perform her number one hit 'Smile', and 'Just Be Good To Green'. In October 2010, Green released the video for his next single "Jungle", which features Maverick Sabre. It was released on 3 January 2011 and reached #31 in the UK Singles Chart.

In 2011 Green was the first social ambassador for the clothing and footwear manufacturer brand Puma, focusing on the fashion and lifestyle side of the brand. In October 2012, Puma launched an exclusive apparel collection designed by Green.

=== 2011–2012: At Your Inconvenience ===
Green's second album, At Your Inconvenience, was released in October 2011. The title track "At Your Inconvenience" was premiered by Zane Lowe on BBC Radio 1 on 13 July 2011. That track was released as a promotional single only, as an instant download upon preorder of the album on iTunes. The first official single, "Read All About It" (with guest vocals from Emeli Sandé), was released on 23 October 2011. On 30 October 2011, it reached #1 in the UK Singles Chart.

The second single released from the album was "Never Be a Right Time", with guest vocals from Ed Drewett. The EP featured remixes from Document One and Drums of London, and a remix of "How Many Moons" featuring fellow UK rappers Dream McLean and Rinse. The "How Many Moons" remix premiered on Mistajam's show on 1Xtra in January 2012. The third single released was "Remedy", featuring Ruth-Anne Cunningham. A remix contest was hosted where producers could download the stems for the track and use them to create a remix.

The fourth single was "Avalon" featuring Sierra Kusterbeck, which appeared on an advert for the energy drink Relentless. Pro Green is a brand ambassador for Relentless, and performed for them at a secret gig in his home town of Hackney, London.

In a 2012 interview, OMD frontman Andy McCluskey credited Professor Green and Labrinth as "great" artists who represented "some of the small amount of music that is still actually trying to go forward".

=== 2013–2014: Growing Up In Public ===
A promotional non-album single, titled "Are You Getting Enough?", featuring Miles Kane and was released in July 2013. After the single failed to chart even in the UK top 100, Green announced that the first "proper" single from the album would be released in January 2014 and the album would follow shortly.

Green performed new tracks titled "I Need Church" and "Little Secrets" in his 2013 live sets. Tweets and Instagram posts also revealed a collaboration with Wretch 32 and iSHi titled "Gross" and another track titled "The Middle". Green also posted a short clip of a collaboration with iSHI and Ella Eyre which didn't make the album.

Green appeared on CBBC show 12 Again, talking about his life at age 12. In April 2013, he released a 54-second teaser of the album's first promotional single "Not Your Man", which features vocals from Thabo.

In 2014, he appeared on a remix of "German Whip" by Meridian Dan, also featuring Skepta, Bossman Birdie and Jordan Stephens. "Not Your Man" premiered in July 2014, and was released as an "instant grat" download on iTunes when you pre-ordered the album. The album's second "instant grat" promotional single, "I Need Church", was released on 16 July. The lead single from the album, "Lullaby" featuring Tori Kelly, was released in September 2014. Growing Up in Public was released in September 2014. The album featured guest appearances from James Craise, Tori Kelly, Mr Probz, Rizzle Kicks, Whinnie Williams, Thabo, Cas and Dream Mclean.

=== 2016–present: Matters of the Heart ===
In November 2016, Professor Green released "One Eye on the Door" with an accompanying music video.

In June 2019, Green announced that he would be releasing the title track of his second EP, Matters of the Heart in July, with the 6-track EP set to be released in September. He will be touring the album. In 2020, the track "Bad Decisions" was released featuring NAHLI.

In August 2021, Green was signed to a worldwide artist services deal with British independent record label Cooking Vinyl.

In January 2026, Green appeared as a contestant on the seventh series of The Masked Singer as "Teabag". He was second to be unmasked.

== Politics ==
In June 2017, Green endorsed Labour Party leader Jeremy Corbyn in the 2017 UK general election. He told fans to stop "listening to the slander and attempted media blanket" of Corbyn, adding: "He is for peace and not war, that doesn't make him weak, nor does it mean he's spineless or without a backbone – quite the opposite." In November 2019, along with 34 other musicians, he signed a letter endorsing Corbyn in the 2019 UK general election with a call to end austerity.

In July 2017, while visiting Rochdale to film a documentary, he confronted the leaders of far right political group Britain First, as reported in the British media, filming an anti-Muslim march he witnessed taking place in the Northern town, interviewing co-leader Jayda Fransen.

== Philanthropy ==
Green is the patron of the anti-suicide charity CALM.

In 2020, Green was one of the 100 celebrity contributors to the book, Dear NHS: 100 Stories to Say Thank You, of which all proceeds went to NHS Charities Together and The Lullaby Trust.

In 2023, Green gave his support to the British Gas Post Office Pop-Ups campaign, where pop-up advice centres, funded by the British Gas Energy Trust, opened in post offices across the UK to offer free money and energy advice, and mental health support.

== Personal life ==
In May 2009, Green was attacked with the neck of a broken bottle in the Cargo nightclub in Shoreditch, London. His assailant was later convicted and sentenced to eight years in prison. In May 2013, Green was crushed between two cars when travelling to perform a live show at Hartpury College in Gloucester. He was taken to hospital with a suspected broken leg, but returned to appear at Harper Adams University in Shropshire after just three weeks, followed by a long set at Glastonbury during the last weekend in June, which included him running along the front row of the audience. In 2019 Green fractured his neck during a seizure, just before leaving for a UK tour.

Green married Millie Mackintosh at Babington House in Somerset in 2013. They divorced in 2016.

Green's autobiography, Lucky, was published in September 2015. It was a Times bestseller. Green presented Suicide and Me on BBC Three on 27 October 2015.

Green is a supporter of Arsenal F.C.

In 2021, he and then partner, actress Karima McAdams, had a baby boy. The family lived in London and split in 2023; in June 2026 they were reported to be back together.

Green was late-diagnosed with autism and ADHD and has publicly spoken about this experience, including in 2026 episodes of Celebs Go Dating and the BBC podcast Access All.

== Filmography ==
| Year | Title | Role | Notes |
|---|---|---|---|
| 2015 | Professor Green: Suicide and Me | Himself | Autobiography |
| 2016–2018 | Lip Sync Battle UK | Co-Host | TV show |
| 2016 | Professor Green: Hidden and Homeless | Himself | Documentary |
| 2016 | Drive | Himself | TV show |
| 2016 | Professor Green: Dangerous Dogs | Himself | Documentary |
| 2017 | Professor Green: Living In Poverty | Himself | Documentary |
| 2017 | Professor Green: Is It Time to Legalise Weed? | Himself | Documentary |
| 2017 | Tipping Point: Lucky Stars | Himself | TV Game Show |
| 2017 | Murder in Successville | Himself | TV show |
| 2018 | Professor Green: Working Class White Men | Himself | Documentary |
| 2018 | John Bishop: In Conversation With... | Himself | Series 4 Episode 1 |
| 2018 | Celebs in Solitary: Meltdown | Himself | TV show/Social Experiment |
| 2019 | Top Gear | Guest | TV show |
| 2019 | My Famous Babysitter | Himself | |
| 2019 | Freeze the Fear with Wim Hoff | Himself | TV show |
| 2026 | The Masked Singer | Teabag | Contestant; series 7 |

== Discography ==
Albums

- Alive Till I'm Dead (2010)
- At Your Inconvenience (2011)
- Growing Up in Public (2014)

== Bibliography ==
- Lucky (Blink Publishing, ISBN 1910536326 / ISBN 978-1910536322, published in September 2015)
- Dear NHS: 100 Stories to Say Thank You (Trapeze, ISBN 1398701181 / ISBN 978-1398701182, published in July 2020)

== Awards and nominations ==
- BT Digital Music Awards 2010
  - Breakthrough Artist of the Year – Won
  - Best Newcomer – Nominated
- MTV Europe Music Awards 2010
  - Best Push Act
- MOBO Awards 2010
  - Best Newcomer – Nominated
  - Best Song - "I Need You Tonight" - Nominated
  - Best Hip Hop/Grime Act - Won
- MP3 Awards 2010
  - Radio/ Charts/ Downloads - "Just Be Good to Green" – Nominated
- Urban Music Awards 2010
  - Best Newcomer – Nominated
  - Best Hip-Hop Act – Nominated
  - Best Song - "I Need You Tonight" – Nominated
- NME Awards 2011
  - Best Dancefloor Filler - "Jungle" – Won

== See also ==
- List of people from the London Borough of Hackney
- Stormzy
