= Devlin discography =

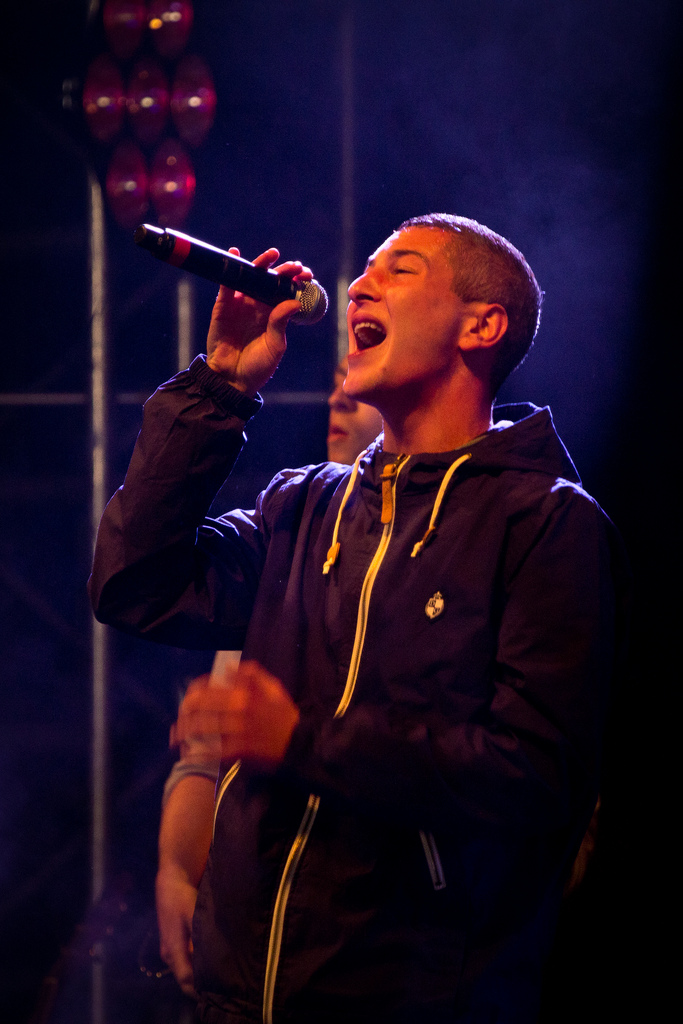
- Studio albums: 6
- Extended plays: 3
- Singles: 29
- Music videos: 13
- Mixtapes: 2

This is the discography of Devlin, an English rapper from Dagenham, East London, England signed to Island Records. He is part of grime collective O.T Crew with Dogzilla, Deeper man, M. Eye, Benson, Kozy, Syer Bars and Daze. Devlin was also a member of the Movement, consisting of himself, Wretch 32, Scorcher, Ghetts, Lightning, Mercston and DJ Unique.

His debut album, Bud, Sweat and Beers was released on Island Records in 2010. The first single from the album was "Brainwashed", which was released on 8 August 2010 in the UK and debuted on the UK Singles Chart at number 31, and number 11 on the UK R&B Chart. The second single, "Runaway", was released on 24 October 2010, where it debuted at number 15, marking Devlin's most successful single to date. The single was succeeded by the release of the debut album Bud, Sweat and Beers, which was released on 1 November 2010 and debuted at number 21 on the UK Albums Chart. "London City" entered the UK chart at number 181 following strong digital downloads from the album. The third single released from the album was "Let It Go" featuring British producer Labrinth. The track, which was released on 31 January 2011, charted at number 59 in the UK based on downloads alone. In January 2011, Devlin appeared on Jessie J's UK version of "Price Tag".

Devlin's second album, A Moving Picture, was released in February 2013. Its lead single, "Watchtower" featuring Ed Sheeran, is Devlin's highest charting single to date, reaching No. 7 on the UK Singles Chart. The album's third single, "Rewind" is his second highest charting single which peaked at No. 10 in the UK. A Moving Picture reached No. 19 on the UK Albums Chart.

His third studio album, The Devil In was released in February 2017 and reached No. 16 on the UK Albums Chart. Its lone single however, "50 Grand", did not chart.

== Albums ==
=== Studio albums ===
Title	Details	Peak chart positions		Certifications
Title	Details	UK	UK R&B	Certifications
Bud, Sweat and Beers	Released: 29 October 2010; Label: Island Records; Formats: CD, digital download	21	2	BPI: Gold
A Moving Picture	Released: 4 February 2013; Label: Island Records; Formats: CD, digital download	19	—	
The Devil In	Released: 10 February 2017; Label: Devlin Music; Formats: CD, digital download	16	—	
The Outcast	Released: 15 March 2019; Label: Devlin Music; Formats: CD, digital download	94	—	
Eyes for the Blind	Released: 11 February 2022; Label: EGA Records; Formats: CD, digital download	—	—	
The James Devlin Album	Released: 7 November 2025; Label: Devlin Music; Formats: CD, digital download	—	—	
"—" denotes album that did not chart or was not released.

=== Mixtapes ===
Title	Details
Tales from the Crypt	Released: 30 October 2006; Label: O.T Recordings; Format: Digital download
The Art of Rolling	Released: 21 July 2008; Label: O.T Recordings; Format: Digital download

=== Extended plays ===
Title	Details
The Devz EP	Released: 10 January 2008; Label: O.T Recordings; Format: Digital download
The Directors Cut	Released: 14 May 2012; Label: O.T Recordings; Format: Digital download
Something in the Water (with Syer B)	Released: 27 April 2018; Label: Syer Music; Format: Digital download
Channelling Rain (with Syer B)	Released: 2 October 2020; Label: Syer Music; Format: Digital download
Perpetual Motion	Released: 20 March 2025; Label: Self-released; Format: Digital download, streaming

== Singles ==
=== As lead artist ===
Single	Year	Peak chart positions			Certifications	Album
Single	Year	UK	UK Dance	UK R&B	Certifications	Album
"Shot Music" (featuring Giggs)	2010	—	—	—		Non-album single
"Brainwashed" (featuring Milena Sanchez)	2010	31	—	11		Bud, Sweat and Beers
"Runaway" (featuring Yasmin)	2010	15	—	—	BPI: Silver	Bud, Sweat and Beers
"Let It Go" (featuring Labrinth)	2011	59	—	19		Bud, Sweat and Beers
"Watchtower" (featuring Ed Sheeran)	2012	7	3	—	BPI: Silver	A Moving Picture
"Off with Their Heads" (featuring Wretch 32)	2012	186	34	—		A Moving Picture
"Rewind" (featuring Diane Birch)	2013	10	3	—		A Moving Picture
"50 Grand" (featuring Skepta)	2015	—	—	—		The Devil In
"Castella Freestyle"	2015	—	—	—		The Devil In
"Bitches"	2016	—	—	—		The Devil In
"Cold Blooded"	2016	—	—	—		The Devil In
"Blow Your Mind" (with Maverick Sabre)	2017	—	—	—		The Devil In
"Blue Skies"	2017	—	—	—		The Devil In
"Mushrooms" (with Syer B)	2018	—	—	—		Something in the Water
"Live in the Booth"	2018	—	—	—		The Outcast
"Fun to Me"	2019	—	—	—		The Outcast
"Limelight"	2019	—	—	—		The Outcast
"Channelling Rain" (with Syer B)	2020	—	—	—		Channelling Rain
"Play It Cool" (with Syer B, Kyze and Rawz Artilla)	2020	—	—	—		Channelling Rain
"Legacy" (with Big Narstie)	2020	—	—	—		Non-album singles
"Adrenaline" (with Wombat)	2020	—	—	—		Non-album singles
"All We Have Is Now" (with Ashley Walters and Jimmy Sharp)	2021	—	—	—		Eyes For The Blind
"Next Breed" (featuring Jme, Frisco, Syer B and Lewi White)	2021	—	—	—		Eyes For The Blind
"Popular Fashion"	2022	—	—	—		Eyes For The Blind
"Don't Try It" (with Chip)	2023	—	—	—		Non-album singles
"No Safety"	2023	—	—	—		Non-album singles
"The Great British Bar Off" (with Ed Sheeran)	2023	—	—	—		Non-album singles
"Trust Me" (with ArrDee)	2024	—	—	—		Non-album singles
"1984"	2025	—	—	—		The James Devlin Album
"—" denotes single that did not chart or was not released.

=== As featured artist ===
Year	Single	Peak chart positions		Album
Year	Single	UK	UK Dance	Album
2010	"Shark Attack" (Sharky Major featuring Devlin, Ghetts, Dot Rotten and P Money)	—	—	Major League
2010	"Game Over" (Tinchy Stryder featuring Giggs, Example, Devlin, Professor Green, Tinie Tempah and Chipmunk)	22	2	Third Strike
2011	"Young Guns" (Lewi White featuring Ed Sheeran, Yasmin, Griminal and Devlin)	86	—	Non-album single
2012	"Never Be Another" (Delilah featuring Devlin)	—	—	From the Roots Up
2014	"2Morrow" (Mark Morrison featuring Erene, Devlin and Crooked I)	—	—	Non-album single
"—" denotes single that did not chart or was not released.

=== Other charted songs ===
Year	Song	Peak chart positions	Album
Year	Song	UK	Album
2009	"London City"	181	Bud, Sweat and Beers

== Other appearances ==
Year	Single	Album
2011	"Lately" (Ed Sheeran featuring Devlin)	No. 5 Collaborations Project
2012	"Up in Flames" (Labrinth featuring Devlin and Tinchy Stryder)	Electronic Earth
2020	"Windowsill" (Zayn featuring Devlin)	Nobody Is Listening

== Music videos ==
Year	Title	Director
2009	"London City"	Digital Dan
2009	"Community Outcast"	Digital Dan
2009	"Shot Music" (with Giggs)	Digital Dan
2009	"Giant" (featuring Sam Jacobs)	Luke Biggins
2010	"Brainwashed"	Dan Sully
2010	"Runaway" (with Yasmin)	Emil Nava
2010	"Game Over" (with Tinchy Stryder et al.)	Adam Powell
2010	"Marching Through the Fog"	Carly Cussen
2010	"Let It Go" (with Labrinth)	Henry Schofield
2011	"Our Father"	
2011	"Young Guns" (with Lewi White et al.)	
2012	"London City Part II"	
2012	"(All Along The) Watchtower"	
2016	"Bring Them All" / "Holy Grime" (featuring Wiley)	
2017	"Blue Skies"	Devlin and Roony 'Rsky'Keefe
