= List of songs written by Emeli Sandé =

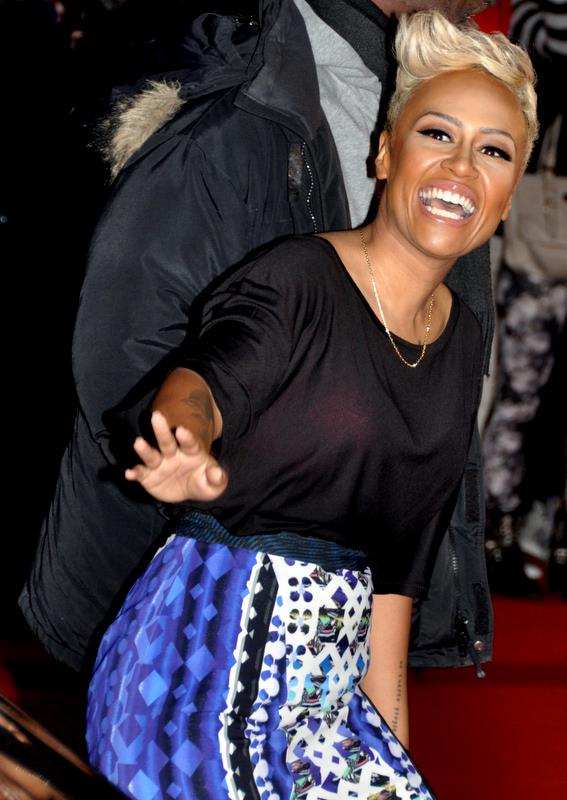
Sandé at the NRJ Music Awards ceremony in Cannes, France, held in January 2013

Scottish singer-songwriter Emeli Sandé has written and recorded songs for her debut studio album, Our Version of Events (2012), and has written songs for other singers. (Note: Sandé is also credited as a writer by the BMI as Adele Emily Sandé.) She worked with Naughty Boy (credited as a songwriter with his legal name Shahid Khan) for the majority of the songs on the album, including writing "Where I Sleep" and "River" together. He appears as a featured artist on the single "Daddy", which was co-written by Grant Mitchell, James Murray and Mustafa Omar. Sandé and Naughty Boy collaborated with Harry Craze, Hugo Chegwin and Mike Spencer on the album's lead single "Heaven", which peaked at number one on the UK Dance Chart. The song was conceptualised when she had a "deep conversation about religion" with Naughty Boy, and she stated that it was written very quickly. Sandé co-wrote the song "My Kind of Love" with Grammy Award winning producer Emile Haynie, and co-wrote the song "Hope" with American singer-songwriter Alicia Keys. In August 2011, record executive Simon Cowell named Sandé his "favourite songwriter" of the moment.

Aside from writing material for her debut album, Sandé has worked with a multitude of singers on songs that have been included on their albums. She reunited with Keys for the latter's fifth studio album Girl on Fire (2012). The pair wrote "101", "Not Even the King" and "Brand New Me". "Brand New Me" was released as the second single from Girl on Fire; the collaborative process of writing with Sandé was described by Keys as being "instant magic". Sandé wrote the song "Half of Me" alongside Naughty Boy and production team Stargate, which was included on Rihanna's seventh studio album, Unapologetic (2012). The singer also contributed to several songs on Leona Lewis' third studio album Glassheart (2012), including the lead single "Trouble", "I to You" and "Sugar". Sandé appeared as a guest vocalist on Professor Green's song "Read All About It" and Labrinth's song "Beneath Your Beautiful". Both songs were co-written by herself and both peaked at number one on the UK Singles Chart and UK R&B Chart.

== Songs ==
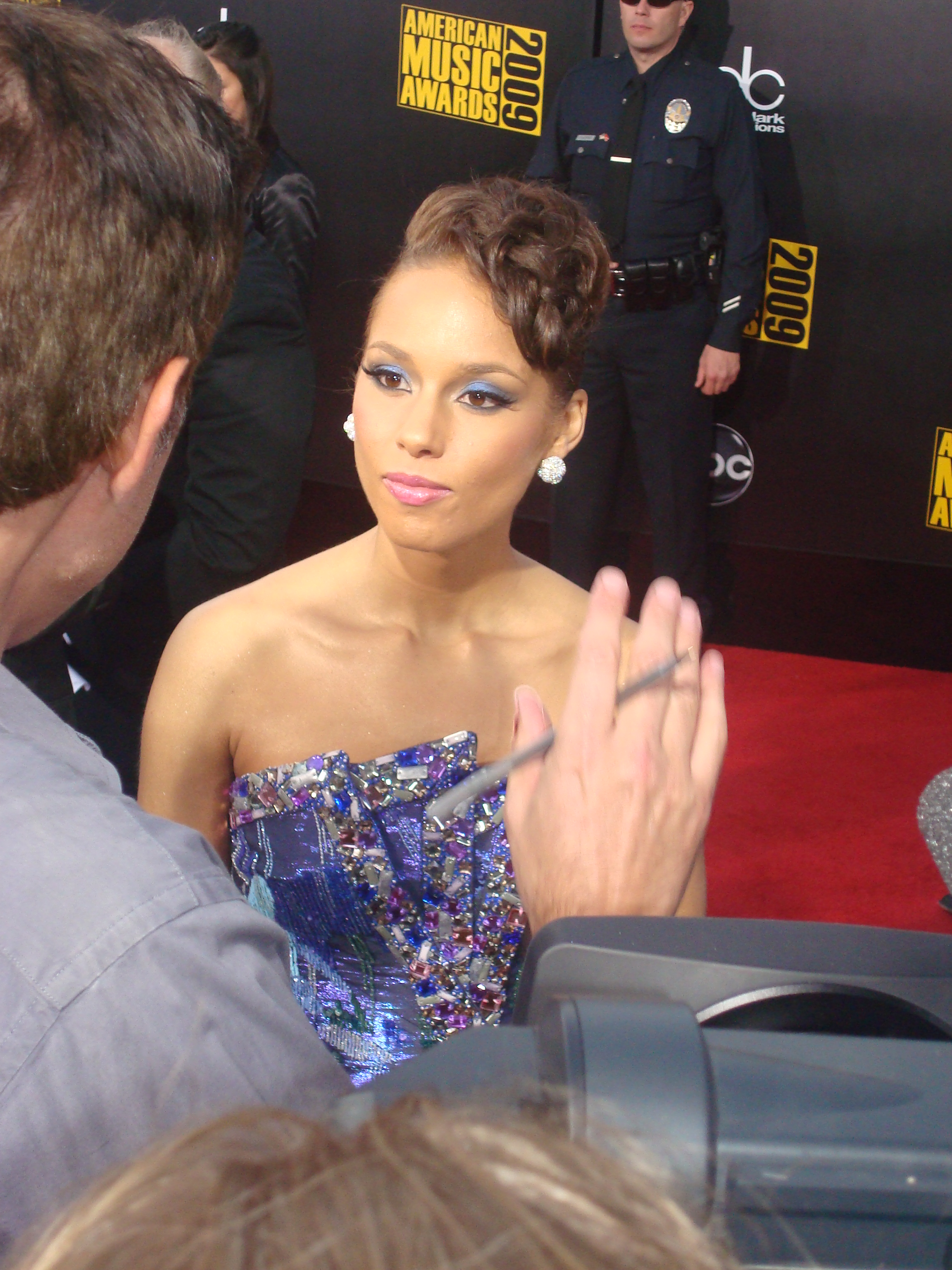
Sandé co-wrote three songs with Alicia Keys (pictured) for the latter's fifth studio album, Girl on Fire (2012), including "Brand New Me".

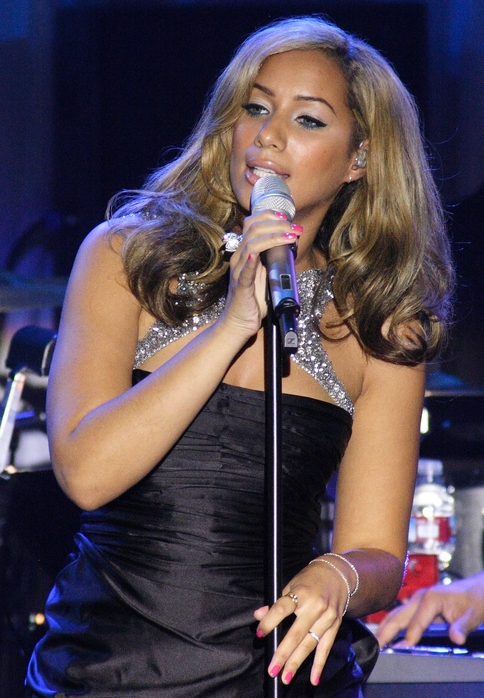
Sandé wrote three songs included on Leona Lewis' (pictured) third studio album Glassheart (2012), including "I to You" and "Trouble".

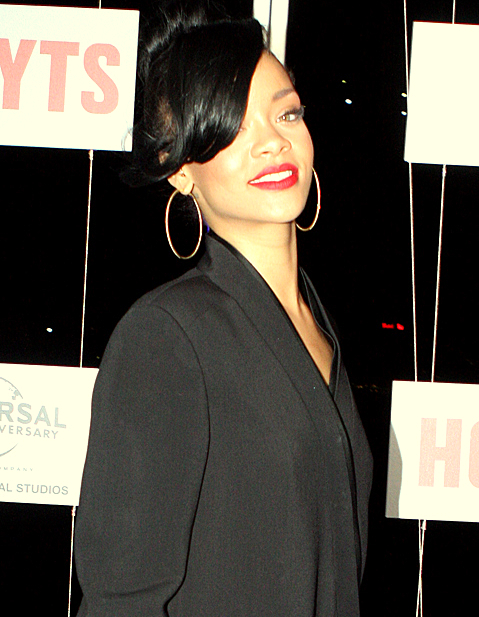
Alongside production team Stargate, Sandé co-wrote the song "Half of Me" for Rihanna's (pictured) seventh studio album, Unapologetic (2012).

Key
| † | Indicates single release |
| # | Indicates promotional single release |
| ‡ | Indicates song written solely by Sandé |

| Song | Artist(s) | Writer(s) | Album | Year | Ref. |
|---|---|---|---|---|---|
| "101" | Alicia Keys | Alicia Keys; Emeli Sandé | Girl on Fire | 2012 | |
| "A Z" | —N/a | Ashton Millard; Emeli Sandé; Paul Hermon | —N/a | Unknown | |
| "Abide with Me" | —N/a | Emeli Sandé; Rick Smith; Traditional | —N/a | Unknown | |
| "Another One" | Emeli Sandé | Emeli Sandé; Lee Stashenko | Let's Say for Instance | 2022 | |
| "Astronaut" | Professor Green | Emeli Sandé; Ludovico Einaudi; Shahid Khan; Stephen Manderson | At Your Inconvenience | 2011 | |
| "Avalon" † | Professor Green featuring Sierra Kusterbeck | Emeli Sandé; James Murray; Luke Juby; Mustafa Omar; Stephen Manderson | At Your Inconvenience | 2011 | |
| "Babe" | Emeli Sandé | Emeli Sandé; Matthew Holmes; Philip Leigh | Long Live the Angels | 2016 | |
| "Babys Eyes" | —N/a | Emeli Sandé ‡ | —N/a | Unknown | |
| "Back to Life" | —N/a | Emeli Sandé; Wayne Hector; Steve Robson | —N/a | Unknown | |
| "Bad Again" | —N/a | Emeli Sandé; Shahid Khan | —N/a | Unknown | |
| "Beneath Your Beautiful" † | Labrinth featuring Emeli Sandé | Emeli Sandé; Timothy McKenzie; Mike Posner | Electronic Earth and Our Version of Events | 2012 | |
| "Best Friend" | —N/a | Emeli Sandé ‡ | —N/a | Unknown | |
| "Bestest Friend" | —N/a | Ashton Millard; Emeli Sandé; Paul Hermon; Prince R. Nelson | —N/a | Unknown | |
| "Better" | —N/a | Emeli Sandé; Shahid Khan | —N/a | Unknown | |
| "Big City Type Distractions" | —N/a | Emeli Sandé; Sam Frank | —N/a | Unknown | |
| "Big Time Dreamers" | —N/a | Emeli Sandé; Rick Nowels; Rob Kleiner; Oh Hush | —N/a | 2017 | |
| "Booty Call" | —N/a | Emeli Sandé ‡ | —N/a | Unknown | |
| "Boys" | Cheryl Cole | Emeli Sandé; James Murray; Mustafa Omer; Shahid Khan | 3 Words – The B-Sides EP | 2010 | |
| "Brainwashed" † | Devlin featuring Milena Sanchez | Emeli Sandé; James Devlin; Pontus Hjelm | Bud, Sweat and Beers | 2010 | |
| "Brand New Me" † | Alicia Keys | Alicia Keys; Emeli Sandé | Girl on Fire | 2012 | |
| "Breaking the Law" | Emeli Sandé | Ben Harrison; Emeli Sandé; Shahid Khan | Our Version of Events | 2012 | |
| "Breathing Underwater" † | Emeli Sandé | Emeli Sandé; Christopher Crowhurst | Long Live the Angels | 2016 | |
| "Brighter Days" † | Emeli Sandé | Emeli Sandé; Ollie Green; Moyses Dos Santos | Let's Say for Instance | 2022 | |
| "Clown" † | Emeli Sandé | Emeli Sandé; Grant Mitchell; Shahid Khan | Our Version of Events | 2012 | |
| "Colour Blind" | Amber Riley | Claude Kelly; Emeli Sandé; Steve Mac | —N/a | Unknown | |
| "Coming From a Man" | —N/a | Emeli Sandé; Shahid Khan | —N/a | Unknown | |
| "Daddy" † | Emeli Sandé featuring Naughty Boy | Emeli Sandé; Grant Mitchell; James Murray; Mustafa Omer; Shahid Khan | Our Version of Events | 2012 | |
| "Diamond Rings" † | Chipmunk featuring Emeli Sandé | Emeli Sandé; Jahmaal Fyffe; Shahid Khan | I Am Chipmunk | 2009 | |
| "Dirty Jeans and Sweater" | —N/a | Emeli Sandé ‡ | —N/a | Unknown | |
| "Distractions" | —N/a | Emeli Sandé; Sam Frank | —N/a | Unknown | |
| "Dreamer" | —N/a | Benjamin Harrison; Emeli Sandé; James Devlin; Shahid Khan | —N/a | Unknown | |
| "Dream On" | Emeli Sandé | Emeli Sandé; Christopher Crowhurst | Long Live the Angels | 2016 | |
| "Easier in Bed" | Emeli Sandé | Chris Loco; Emeli Sandé | Our Version of Events | 2012 | |
| "Ego" | —N/a | Emeli Sandé; Shahid Khan | —N/a | Unknown | |
| "Enough" | —N/a | Amund Bjørklund; Emeli Sandé; Espen Lind | —N/a | Unknown | |
| "Every Single Little Piece" | Emeli Sandé | Emeli Sandé; Matthew Holmes; Philip Leigh | Long Live the Angels | 2016 | |
| "Extraordinary Being" † | Emeli Sandé | Emeli Sandé; Troy Miller; Laidi Saliasi | Real Life | 2019 | |
| "Falling Down" | —N/a | Cleopatra Humphrey; Emeli Sandé; James Murray; Margaret Bakosi; Mustafa Omer | —N/a | Unknown | |
| "Family" † | Emeli Sandé | Emeli Sandé; Henri Davies | Let's Say for Instance | 2022 | |
| "Find a Boy" | —N/a | Aminata Kabba; Emeli Sandé; Rocky Takalobighashi; Shahid Khan | —N/a | Unknown | |
| "Fireworks" | Alessandra Amoroso | Christopher Crowhurst; Emeli Sandé | Amore puro | 2013 | |
| "Fix Me" | —N/a | Emeli Sandé; Shahid Khan | —N/a | Unknown | |
| "Free" | —N/a | Amir Izadkhah; Emeli Sandé; Kesi Dryden; Piers Sean Aggett | —N/a | Unknown | |
| "Free as a Bird" | Emeli Sandé | Emeli Sandé; Laidi Saliasi; Jacob McKenzie | Real Life | 2019 | |
| "Garden" | Emeli Sandé featuring Jay Electronica and Áine Zion | Emeli Sandé; Christopher Crowhurst; Timothy Thedford; Áine Zion | Long Live the Angels | 2016 | |
| "Give Me a Minute" | —N/a | Emeli Sandé; J. Velard | —N/a | Unknown | |
| "Give Me Something" | Emeli Sandé | Emeli Sandé; Matthew Holmes; Philip Leigh; Christopher Crowhurst | Long Live the Angels | 2016 | |
| "Go Lover" | —N/a | Emeli Sandé; Shahid Khan | —N/a | Unknown | |
| "Golden" | —N/a | Chris Braide; Emeli Sandé | —N/a | Unknown | |
| "Half of Me" | Rihanna | Emeli Sandé; Mikkel S. Eriksen; Shahid Khan; Tor Erik Hermansen | Unapologetic | 2012 | |
| "Happen" | Emeli Sandé | Emeli Sandé; Matthew Holmes; Philip Leigh; Jonny Coffer; Shahid Khan | Long Live the Angels | 2016 | |
| "Heaven" † | Emeli Sandé | Emeli Sandé; Harry Craze; Hugo Chegwin; Mike Spencer; Shahid Khan | Our Version of Events | 2012 | |
| "Helicopters and Planes" | —N/a | Anthony L. Jones; Emeli Sandé; Shahid Khan; Sheraaz Amin | —N/a | Unknown | |
| "Here It Comes" | —N/a | Emeli Sandé; Rick Smith | —N/a | Unknown | |
| "Highs & Lows" | Emeli Sandé | Emeli Sandé; Tom Barnes; Peter Kelleher; Ben Kohn; Wayne Hector | Long Live the Angels | 2016 | |
| "Hollywood" | —N/a | Emeli Sandé; Shahid Khan | —N/a | Unknown | |
| "Honest" | Emeli Sandé | Emeli Sandé; Troy Miller | Real Life | 2019 | |
| "Hope" | Emeli Sandé | Alicia Keys; Emeli Sandé | Our Version of Events | 2012 | |
| "Hotel Cabana" | —N/a | Emeli Sandé; Patrick Okogwu; Shahid Khan | —N/a | Unknown | |
| "Human" | Emeli Sandé | Emeli Sandé; Nana G. Boateng | Real Life | 2019 | |
| "Hurts" † | Emeli Sandé | Emeli Sandé; Matthew Holmes; Philip Leigh; James Murray; Mustafa Omer | Long Live the Angels | 2016 | |
| "I'd Rather Not" | Emeli Sandé | Emeli Sandé; Shahid Khan; Jonny Coffer; Shakil Ashraf | Long Live the Angels | 2016 | |
| "I'm Not Sorry" | —N/a | Anthony John McLean; Emeli Sandé; Shahid Khan | —N/a | Unknown | |
| "I to You" | Leona Lewis | Christopher Crowhurst; Emeli Sandé; Leona Lewis | Glassheart | 2012 | |
| "It Takes Two" | Katy Perry | Katy Perry; Benjamin Levin; Emeli Sandé; Mikkel Storleer Eriksen & Tor Erik Hermansem | Prism | 2013 | |
| "July 25th" | Emeli Sandé | Emeli Sandé; Yoana Karemova | Let's Say for Instance | 2022 | |
| "Just a Boy" | —N/a | Emeli Sandé; Shahid Khan | —N/a | Unknown | |
| "Kids that Love to Dance" | —N/a | Emeli Sandé; Shahid Khan; Steven Marsden | —N/a | Unknown | |
| "Kill the Boy" | —N/a | Emeli Sandé ‡ | —N/a | Unknown | |
| "Kung Fu" | Emeli Sandé | Emeli Sandé; Jonny Coffer | Long Live the Angels | 2016 | |
| "Let Go" | Tinie Tempah featuring Emeli Sandé | Ben Harrison; Emile Hayne; Shahid Khan; Patrick Okogwu; Emeli Sandé | Disc-Overy | 2010 | |
| "Let It Rain" † | Tinchy Stryder featuring Melanie Fiona | Emeli Sandé; Kwasi Danquah III; Melanie Fiona | Third Strike | 2011 | |
| "Lifetime" | Emeli Sandé | Emeli Sandé; Glyn Aikins; Luke Juby; Shahid Khan; Steve Mostyn | Our Version of Events | 2012 | |
| "Lifted" | —N/a | Emeli Sandé; Shahid Khan | —N/a | Unknown | |
| "Lola" | —N/a | Emeli Sandé; Kaywan Qazzaz; Louis Christopher Bryn; Said Saif Haider Naqui; Syed Shabi Haider Nagvi | —N/a | Unknown | |
| "Lonely" | Emeli Sandé | Emeli Sandé; Matthew Holmes; James Murray; Mustafa Omer; Philip Leigh | Long Live the Angels | 2016 | |
| "Look In Your Eyes" | Emeli Sandé | Emeli Sandé; Garfield Booker; Jimmy Hamilton; Maurice Hayes; Teddy Raab | Let's Say for Instance | 2022 | |
| "Look What You've Done" † | Emeli Sandé with Jaykae | Emeli Sandé; Janum Khan | Let's Say for Instance | 2022 | |
| "Looks Can Be Deceiving" | —N/a | Emeli Sandé; Shahid Khan | —N/a | Unknown | |
| "Love to Help" | Emeli Sandé | Emeli Sandé; Laidi Saliasi | Real Life | 2019 | |
| "Maybe" | Emeli Sandé | Ash Millard; Emeli Sandé; Paul Hermon | Our Version of Events | 2012 | |
| "Mountains" (Note: "Mountains" was originally recorded by Leona Lewis for her third album, Glassheart (2012). However, for unknown reasons, Sandé reclaimed the song for inclusion on Our Version of Events.) | Emeli Sandé / Leona Lewis | Luke Juby; Shahid Khan; James Murray; Mustafa Omer; Emeli Sandé | Our Version of Events | 2012 | |
| "Moving" | —N/a | Emeli Sandé ‡ | —N/a | Unknown | |
| "Mr Officer" | —N/a | Emeli Sandé; Shahid Khan | —N/a | Unknown | |
| "My Heart" | Richard Kylea Cowie | Christopher Crowhurst; Emeli Sandé; Karim Kharbouch; Richard Kylea Cowie | —N/a | Unknown | |
| "My Kind of Love" † | Emeli Sandé | Emile Haynie; Emeli Sandé | Our Version of Events | 2012 | |
| "My Pleasure" | Emeli Sandé | Emeli Sandé; Jabulani Sithole; Sarah Eloho | Let's Say for Instance | 2022 | |
| "Naturally" | Emeli Sandé | Emeli Sandé; Tom Barnes; Wayne Hector; Peter Kelleher; Ben Kohn | Long Live the Angels | 2016 | |
| "New World" | —N/a | Emeli Sandé; J Velard | —N/a | Unknown | |
| "Next to Me" † | Emeli Sandé | Emeli Sandé; Hugo Chegwin; Harry Craze | Our Version of Events | 2012 | |
| "Not Even the King" | Alicia Keys | Alicia Keys; Emeli Sandé | Girl on Fire | 2012 | |
| "Nothing Left to Lose" | —N/a | Dave Tozer; Emeli Sandé | —N/a | Unknown | |
| "Oh La La" | —N/a | Emeli Sandé; Shahid Khan | —N/a | Unknown | |
| "Oxygen" | Emeli Sandé | Emeli Sandé; Lee Stashenko | Let's Say for Instance | 2022 | |
| "Patchwork" | —N/a | Emeli Sandé ‡ | —N/a | Unknown | |
| "Pluto" | —N/a | Emeli Sandé; Shahid Khan | —N/a | Unknown | |
| "Push It All Away" | —N/a | Emeli Sandé; Shahid Khan | —N/a | Unknown | |
| "Radio" † | Alesha Dixon | Ben Scarr; Emeli Sandé; Shahid Khan | The Entertainer | 2010 | |
| "Radio" (Klass Remix Edit) | Alesha Dixon featuring Wiley | Ben Scarr; Emeli Sandé; Richard Cowie; Shahid Khan | "Radio" Digital EP | 2010 | |
| "Read All About It (Part III)" # | Emeli Sandé | Ben Kohn; Emeli Sandé; Iain James; Peter Kelleher; Stephen Manderson; Tom Barnes | Our Version of Events | 2012 | |
| "Read All About It" † | Professor Green featuring Emeli Sandé | Ben Kohn; Emeli Sandé; Iain James; Peter Kelleher; Stephen Manderson; Tom Barnes | At Your Inconvenience | 2011 | |
| "Ready to Love" | Emeli Sandé | Emeli Sandé; Ollie Green | Let's Say for Instance | 2022 | |
| "Real Life" | Emeli Sandé | Emeli Sandé; Laidi Saliasi | Real Life | 2019 | |
| "Recovery" | —N/a | Emeli Sandé; Shahid Khan | —N/a | Unknown | |
| "Reebok Song" | —N/a | Emeli Sandé ‡ | —N/a | Unknown | |
| "Right Now" | Emeli Sandé | Emeli Sandé; Matthew Holmes; Philip Leigh; Shahid Khan | Long Live the Angels | 2016 | |
| "River" | Emeli Sandé | Emeli Sandé; Shahid Khan | Our Version of Events | 2012 | |
| "Run Away" | —N/a | Emeli Sandé; Kaywan Qazzaz; Louis Christopher Bryn; Said Saif Haider Naqui; Syed Shabi Haider Nagvi | —N/a | Unknown | |
| "Same Old Feeling" | Emeli Sandé | Emeli Sandé; Laidi Saliasi; Jacob McKenzie; Christopher Hanlon | Real Life | 2019 | |
| "Selah" | Emeli Sandé | Emeli Sandé ‡ | Long Live the Angels | 2016 | |
| "September 8th" | Emeli Sandé | Emeli Sandé; Garfield Booker; Jimmy Hamilton; Maurice Hayes; Teddy Raab | Let's Say for Instance | 2022 | |
| "Shakes" | Emeli Sandé | Emeli Sandé; Shahid Khan; Jonny Coffer | Long Live the Angels | 2016 | |
| "Shine" † | Emeli Sandé | Emeli Sandé‡ | Real Life | 2019 | |
| "Side Effects of You" | Fantasia Barrino | Benjamin Harrison; Claudia Brent; Emeli Sandé; Shahid Khan | Side Effects of You | 2013 | |
| "Silent" | —N/a | Emeli Sandé ‡ | —N/a | Unknown | |
| "So Sentimental" | —N/a | Emeli Sandé; Kaywan Qazzaz; Syed Shabi Haider Nagvi | —N/a | Unknown | |
| "Somebody" | Emeli Sandé | Emeli Sandé; Christopher Crowhurst | Long Live the Angels | 2016 | |
| "SoopaDoopaLova" | —N/a | Emeli Sandé ‡ | —N/a | Unknown | |
| "Sparrow" † | Emeli Sandé | Emeli Sandé; Laidi Saliasi | Real Life | 2019 | |
| "Started with a Kiss" | —N/a | Emeli Sandé; Shahid Khan | —N/a | Unknown | |
| "Stay Awake" | —N/a | Emeli Sandé; Shahid Khan; Steve Mostyn | —N/a | Unknown | |
| "Stay Here in the Sun" † | TĀLĀ featuring Naughty Boy | Jasmine Tadjiky; Emeli Sandé; Shahid Khan; Harry Craze; Hugo Chegwin | TBA | 2018 | |
| "Still Standing" | —N/a | Emeli Sandé; Shahid Khan; Wayne Hector | —N/a | Unknown | |
| "Sugar" | Leona Lewis | Alexander Shuckburg; Emeli Sandé | Glassheart | 2012 | |
| "Suitcase" | Emeli Sandé | Ben Harrison; Emeli Sandé; Luke Juby | Our Version of Events | 2012 | |
| "Summer" | Emeli Sandé | Emeli Sandé; Henri Davies | Let's Say for Instance | 2022 | |
| "Superhuman" | Emeli Sandé | Emeli Sandé; Sam Sumser | Let's Say for Instance | 2022 | |
| "Survivor" | Emeli Sandé | Emeli Sandé; Laidi Saliasi | Real Life | 2019 | |
| "Sweet Architect" | Emeli Sandé | Emeli Sandé; Jonny Coffer; Mustafa Omer; James Murray | Long Live the Angels | 2016 | |
| "Taking the Radio" | —N/a | Emeli Sandé; Richard W. Nowells Jr. | —N/a | Unknown | |
| "Talk to Me" | —N/a | Amir Izadkhah; Emeli Sandé; Kesi Dryden; Piers Sean Aggett | —N/a | Unknown | |
| "Tenderly" | Emeli Sandé featuring Joel Sandé and The Serenje Choir | Emeli Sandé; Matthew Holmes; Philip Leigh; Joel Sandé | Long Live the Angels | 2016 | |
| "There Isn't Much" † | Emeli Sandé | Emeli Sandé; Fredrik Ball; Shahid Khan; Shakil Ashraf | Let's Say for Instance | 2022 | |
| "This Much Is True" | Emeli Sandé | Emeli Sandé ‡ | Long Live the Angels | 2016 | |
| "This Will Be the Year" | Susan Boyle | Emeli Sandé; Josh Kear; Shahid Khan | Someone to Watch Over Me | 2011 | |
| "Tiger" | Emeli Sandé | Emeli Sandé; Shahid Khan | Our Version of Events | 2012 | |
| "Til the End" | —N/a | Emeli Sandé; Kwasi Esono Danquah; Shahid Khan | —N/a | Unknown | |
| "Trouble" † | Leona Lewis featuring Childish Gambino | Emeli Sandé; Fraser T Smith; Hugo Chegwin; Harry Craze; James Murray; Leona Lewis; Musta Omer; Shahid Khan | Glassheart | 2012 | |
| "Underdog Law" | —N/a | Emeli Sandé; Jermaine Scott | —N/a | Unknown | |
| "Untouchable" | —N/a | Emeli Sandé; Marcus Allen; Melvin Joe Sparkman | —N/a | Unknown | |
| "Very Little Good" | —N/a | Emeli Sandé; Shahid Khan; P. Pelsted | —N/a | Unknown | |
| "Wait for Me" | Emeli Sandé | Emeli Sandé; Christopher Hanlon; Jacob McKenzie; Laidi Saliasi; Mike Mayfield | Let's Say for Instance | 2022 | |
| "Where I Sleep" | Emeli Sandé | Emeli Sandé; Shahid Khan | Our Version of Events | 2012 | |
| "Wonder" † | Naughty Boy featuring Emeli Sandé | Emeli Sandé; Hugo Chegwin; Harry Craze; Shahid Khan | Hotel Cabana and Our Version of Events | 2012 | |
| "World Go Round" | Emeli Sandé | Emeli Sandé; Ray Angry | Let's Say for Instance | 2022 | |
| "You Are Not Alone" † | Emeli Sandé | Emeli Sandé; Salaam Remi; James Poyser | Real Life | 2019 | |
| "Yes You Can" | Emeli Sandé | Emeli Sandé; Darren Jones; Nicky Brown | Let's Say for Instance | 2022 | |
| "Your Song" ‡ | —N/a | Emeli Sandé | —N/a | Unknown | |
