= On My Own (Yasmin song) =

Single by Yasmin
- Released: 30 January 2011
- Recorded: 2010
- Genre: Trip hop
- Length: 3:53
- Label: Ministry of Sound/Levels Recordings
- Songwriter: Yasmin Shahmir
- Producer: Shy FX

Yasmin singles chronology
"Runaway" (2010)	"On My Own" (2011)	"Finish Line" (2011)

"On My Own" is the first official single by singer-songwriter Yasmin. The single was released on 30 January 2011 for digital download.

Yasmin did an acoustic performance for The Biz Sessions at The Sun. She performed her song "On My Own", "Finish Line" and a cover of Ellie Goulding’s "Starry Eyed".

== Background ==
"I'm starting to realise, the more that I'm writing, that independence is a recurring theme in my songs. I am quite an independent person. It’s one of they [sic] things where if you want something done sometimes it’s better to do it yourself. When I moved to London, I was nineteen and didn’t know a lot of people. Doing DJ gigs meant I'd be getting trains at 10pm to get to work and then at 3am to come back. I’d be sitting in Kings Cross station with a coffee from the 24 hour Starbucks myself. I've never been one of those people with tag alongs or anything. I just sort of get on with it really. A lot of times when you are yourself, sitting there, you have a lot of time to reflect and think about what you are doing and you realise how isolated the business can be. That is what my song was about and indeed what a lot of my other songs have been inspired by."

— Yasmin speaking to Natasha Reid of The Banter about the song.

At the age of 17, Yasmin began DJing in Glasgow where there was little opportunity of success for her. In a January 2011 report by Mikey McMonagle of the Daily Record, she mentioned, "I would never be the person I am if I had not started there." Yasmin honed her passion for music as a DJ in Glasgow where she played at night clubs such as Kushion and The Tunnel. She continued as a DJ there, even though her shifts were long and earnings low. BBC Radio 1 Xtra got in touch with Yasmin to ask her to develop a song for their homegrown podcast. This inspired Yasmin to quit her physiotherapy degree and move to London to pursue her musical career. She then established herself as a DJ in London at private parties and a support act for the tours of Dizzee Rascal, N.E.R.D, will.i.am, Taio Cruz and Eve. In the Daily Record report, she admitted that it was her London surroundings and the encouragement of Pharrell Williams of N.E.R.D which gave her the confidence to want to launch a solo career:

"I always wrote songs but there wasn't much of a scene for the music I was into - the hip hop and urban stuff. Then I moved to London and ended up making a name for myself and meeting people like Pharrell. I mentioned to a few of these guys that I write music, played some to them and they told me I had something. Of course seeing these people spurred me on. Being in London makes everything so much closer. I could see in front of me where I wanted to be. It really gives you drive and ambition as you can see the goal."

"On My Own" was written by Yasmin, Ian Greenidge and its producer Andre Williams, who goes by the stage name of Shy FX. Yasmin's DJing experience enriched her with A&R knowledge which allowed her to choose and meet up with Shy FX to produce "On My Own". She knew Shy FX from her time as a DJ and was a fan of his work, and later phoned him for a studio session. Speaking to Alex Andrews of Gigwise, Yasmin elaborated on her love for Shy FX's production style, "I don't have to say much to him, he just knows exactly what to do." She was then signed to Levels Entertainment and Ministry of Sound on 1 April 2010. She then achieved her first commercial success when she featured on Devlin's 2010 single "Runaway", which peaked at number 15 on the UK Singles Chart. Inspired by these events leading up to the launch of her solo career, Yasmin wrote "On My Own". The song was very personal to Yasmin as it represented her journey in the music industry. Writing about the independence themes of the song, Semper Azeez-Harris of Blues & Soul mentioned that Yasmin's path was not followed by the formulaic "I always wanted to be a singer" mould, adding, "Whilst a love for music is the prerequisite for wanting to be a singer the fact that she chose the male dominated world of DJing initially as a way to satiate that love of music, epitomises her independence streak." Speaking to Azeez-Harris, Yasmin explained how she was constantly patronised when DJing, "In a lot of scenarios I have been [at] gigs where people have not heard me before but once I get on the decks people cannot tell me that I do not deserve to be on there." She was also inspired by music of the 1990s during the song's development, naming Massive Attack, Madonna and All Saints as some of the acts which influenced the track. In the Daily Record report, Yasmin mentioned, "[The 1990s] was a really cool time, with a lot of mood and vibe in the music, recently a lot music is very samey, it's nice to be able to go back to a mood and groove." She wanted "On My Own" to be "fresh but familiar, new school but old school." Her experience as a DJ in Glasgow is manifested in the song's lyrics. One particular experience was explained by Yasmin, "Because of being there I was not fazed by the flashy London business - champagne, footballers and models, [...] you did it because you loved it but here a lot of people get into it because they wanted that lifestyle." Speaking to Live Magazine, Yasmin said that "On My Own" is about being brave, taking risks, looking after yourself and making things happen for yourself. She added: "I think when someone is fine being on their own and being in their own company that's strong. My friend's mum always used to stay stuff to us, because my friend is a stylist and I was doing what I was doing so we would message each other and be like oh my god I'm just sitting for lunch on my own - how embarrassing but my friend's mum would say it takes a very strong person to sit in a restaurant on their own." The bulk of the parent album for "On My Own" shares its theme of independence.

BBC Radio 1 Xtra were the first radio station to playlist "On My Own" when they did so in November 2010. A digital EP of the single was then released by Levels and Ministry of Sound internationally on 30 January 2011 as Yasmin's debut single. The EP features two accompanying remixes of the song by British DJ and producer Burns and Stenchman. A separate remixes EP featuring a radio edit and club mix by Steve Smart & Westfunk was also released on 30 January 2011, but in the United Kingdom and Ireland only. On 31 January 2011, it was released in the United Kingdom on a 12" and two CD single formats.

== Composition ==
"On My Own" is a down to midtempo electronic trip hop song, which incorporates elements of dubstep, R&B, 1990s pop and dance. It features a stealthily ingratiating chorus and a defining breakdown. Instrumentally, the song consists of atmospheric drum and bass and gently skittering percussion which gives way to a deep and broad sound. The song's hook is confidently delivered around Yasmin's breathy vocals sung in a throwing-like manner. Yasmin uses a floaty, soft and telling vocal tone to sing "On My Own" over its brooding, head-nodding, rolling and old school beat.

"I just always wanted to go and do things and if no one would come with me, I'd just go and do it anyway. Then I think that attitude and confidence and independence allowed me to just move to London without knowing anyone or having any connections and pursuing what I want to do. I have always been a bit of hustler. I had a little reputation - 'Yasmin the hustler' - and that's what I try and portray in my lyrics [for 'On My Own']"

— Yasmin talking to Andrei Harmsworth of British newspaper Metro about the story behind the song's lyrics.

Lyrically, "On My Own" was written by Yasmin as a song about her efforts to become a success in the music industry, and discusses the tough decisions that have defined her young life. It chronicles her decision to break away from status quo and follow her dreams, and contains a theme of independence. The opening lyric, "Could this be a big mistake?", is seen as a brave interrogatory that evokes clarity and honesty; by song's end, Yasmin finds comfort in her new-found independence and, despite the risk of failure, derives empowerment from her journey nonetheless. Regarding the lyric "And I'll do this till I reach my goal," Yasmin has stated she does not exactly know what her goal is but when she reaches it she will know. In an interview with Dianne Bourne of Manchester Evening News, Yasmin quipped, "I dropped out of university to pursue my music career and I know my parents were worried at the time, but hopefully I've proven that it does pay off to follow your dreams." Nick Levine of the music website Digital Spy, interpreted the song, "[Yasmin is] singing about reaching for the stars rather than patting herself on the back for having shot right past them". According to Levine, Yasmin admits "with a modesty that most wannabe popstars would need blackmailing to feign" in the lyrics "And if I fail, at least I know I did it on my own". Toksala from MTV Iggy described the song as an anthem to independence and fearlessly following your passions, adding, "Though just into her twenties, [Yasmin] has already learned a thing or two about making it on her own in the music business and earned the right to sing about it." DJ Ron Slomowicz of About.com wrote, "[Yasmin] questions and laments her choices before finding confidence that she did it all on her own". Musically, "On My Own" garnered comparisons to 1990s dance acts Way Out West, Hybrid and Massive Attack.

== Reception ==
=== Critical ===
Digital Spy's Nick Levine awarded "On My Own" a four (out of five) -star rating, deeming its lyrics as refreshing and its breakdown as one "Neneh Cherry wouldn't sniff at". DJ Ron Slomowicz of About.com praised the track's lyrical concept, Shy FX's production and Yasmin's vocals. Describing the song as "spunky", Slomowicz predicted it to be Ministry of Sound's first hit of 2011, adding, "Don't be surprised if this one finds its way onto a variety of floors this winter." Paul Lester from The Guardian described Shy FX's arrangement on the track as "tastefully lavish" and felt that the song had "hit single written all over it". BBC Radio 1 Xtra's MistaJam lauded "On My Own" as "massive" and featured it as the stations 'Jam Hot Record' of the week on 16 November 2010. Mike McMonagle of the Daily Record considered the song as "spectacular", praising its "thrillingly effective" tune and Yasmin's "sensational" voice. "On My Own" was positively reviewed by Semper Azeez-Harris from Blues & Soul, who wrote, "It is an absolutely brilliant single which immediately had me reminiscing with its telling old skool beat produced by the urban producer who seems able to put his hand to any genre, Shy FX." Additionally, Azeez-Harris praised Yasmin's vocal and songwriting abilities, and mentioned, "['On My Own'] is indeed the type of single that every artist would want: different and catchy". A writer for Aslan Media gave the track a positive response, "With a touching voice, talent, and multicultural palette, Yasmin is undoubtedly an artist on the rise." The writer added, "And even though her body of work remains relatively undeveloped, it is clear that, in time, her music will gain a definition that will bring further success and international fame", concluding, "From all the attention generated from her debut, it’s clear Yasmin can most certainly make it on her own." Brandon Veevers of Renowned for Sound positively reviewed the track, writing, "Tinted with an atmospheric Drum'n'Bass vibe similar to the likes of some early Massive Attack material, 'On My Own' is a rich, well filled out piece." He added, "Throwing breathy vocals around some confidently delivered hooks Yasmin is a talent that is destined for something pretty special." Veevers went on to predict the single's success, commenting, "[Yasmin] is rightfully about to claim her own piece of the limelight with this sturdy and radio friendly track of independence."

=== Commercial ===
On 1 February 2011, it was revealed that "On My Own" was at number 24 midweek on the UK Singles Chart, but by the end of the week the single debuted at number 39, selling 8,162 copies. In an interview with We Are SME, Yasmin explained her delight with the single's chart peak in the United Kingdom: "I'm really happy because it's the first single, it's weird because there's nothing tangible; nobody gives you a certificate to say where you are in the chart, you just know you are and can see it on a computer screen." The following week the song dropped to number 62, which was its final week on the chart. Subsequently, "On My Own" resulted in Yasmin's second-consecutive top 40 hit in the United Kingdom, and has since become her third most successful single to-date, behind "Finish Line" (number 13) and "Runaway" (number 15).

== Music video ==
When your videos first go on YouTube, you are like, 'I just want everyone to like me and think I'm nice and blah blah.' Then you go to an event and you realise you can never have a good picture all the time. When you read the magazines with all the bad photos, you think that's going to happen so you just have to accept it.

—Yasmin speaking to Harmsworth of Metro about the music video. (2011)

A music video for "On My Own" was shot from 07:00 until midnight with a large crew and many extras. As soon as the video was shot, Yasmin had to fly out to Los Angeles for a gig and the video was sent out for her approval but after viewing it Yasmin felt that it did not represent her well. Speaking to Beverley Lyons of the Daily Record, she mentioned, "It didn't represent me and I was cringing," adding, "I couldn't put it out there but I was in LA for 10 days and couldn't do anything fast." While Yasmin was in Los Angeles, she called around and when she arrived back in London on 25 November 2010, she was asked to do another of the video but she still felt it was a poor representation of herself. On 26 November, she phoned everyone she knew and arranged to shoot a second video which she had to present on 29 November. She knew some good videographers and producers from her previous work with Devlin on "Runaway" and she managed to work within a budget of £1000. Speaking to Lyons, Yasmin said, "I paid for [the video] all myself as the budget had been used up on the official video and luckily lots of people gave me reduced rates." She then decided on friend, Luke Monaghan, to shoot the music video with her. Monaghan had previously worked behind the scenes for Professor Green and Emil Nava. "On My Own" marked Monaghan's first music video that he directed himself. Monaghan and Nava directed the video together. A friend of Yasmin's also allowed her to make use of a house as part of the shoot's location. Yasmin shot the new video all day long on 27 November and in the evening, Paul O'Reilly begun editing it right through to 28 November. O'Reilly then gave Yasmin a harddrive with the edited video which she presented to her label at 09:00 on 29 November and then delivered to television stations. The music video premiered on 3 December 2010. Upon the result of the newly shot video, she was pleased, saying, "The setting and the sort of mood of everything was like 'Look at this. It's so trendy.'" She told Lyons of the Daily Record, "[The second video] was a bit more intimate and I wanted people to get to know me. I didn't even recognise me in the original [video] but in the video I did I'm the only person you get to see. You get to know me." Yasmin's change of heart upset a few people in the industry but she was determined to send out the right message from the start, she added:

Of course it put people's noses out of joint. I'm a control freak. I might wind people up but they would not have it any other way. I can see how artists get caught up with the hype and lose why they are actually doing it. You think, 'I'm signed to a label' and you walk into a room and you're the reason 30 people are there. It's easy to get caught up in it but I always remember why I'm doing what I'm doing.

The music video sees Yasmin walking down streets at night and ending up at house party situation. MTV Iggy's Toksala gave the music video a positive review, writing, "There isn't a lot going on in the video except a thoughtful mood, some bold style choices, and a whole lot of flirting with the camera, but this is fine. It gives you the chance to get to know this new face on the scene - and it gives me time to make mental notes about how I can get every last detail of her look."

== Track listings and formats ==
- Digital EP
1. "On My Own" – 3:53
2. "On My Own" (Burns ESM Remix) – 6:02
3. "On My Own" (Stenchman Remix) – 4:00
4. "On My Own" (Instrumental) – 3:47
- Digital Steve Smart & Westfunk Remix Single
1. "On My Own" (Steve Smart & Westfunk Radio Edit) – 3:03
2. "On My Own" (Steve Smart & Westfunk Club Mix) – 7:00
- 12"
1. "On My Own" – 3:53
2. "On My Own" (Burns ESM Remix) – 6:02
3. "On My Own" (Stenchman Remix) – 4:00
- CD single
1. "On My Own" (Radio Edit) – 3:18
2. "On My Own" – 3:53
- CD single (The Remixes)
1. "On My Own" (Radio Edit) – 3:18
2. "On My Own" (Steve Smart & Westfunk Extended Edit) – 3:49
3. "On My Own" (Steve Smart & Westfunk Radio Edit) – 3:03
4. "On My Own" (Burns ESM Remix) – 6:02
5. "On My Own" (Stenchman Remix) – 4:00

== Charts ==
Chart (2011)	Peak position
UK Singles (Official Charts)	39

== Release history ==
Region	Date	Format
United Kingdom	30 January 2011	Digital download
