= Off with Their Heads =

Off with Their Heads may refer to:

- Off with Their Heads (band), an American punk band
- Off with Their Heads (album), a 2008 album by Kaiser Chiefs
- "Off with Their Heads" (song), a 2012 song by Devlin
- "Off with their heads!", a phrase spoken by the Queen of Hearts in Lewis Carroll's Alice's Adventures in Wonderland

== See also ==
- Decapitation
- Off with His Head, a 1957 novel by Ngaio Marsh
- Off with Her Head (EP), a 2010 EP by Huntress
- "Off With Her Head" (Batwoman), an episode of Batwoman
- "Heads Will Roll" (song), a 2009 song by Yeah Yeah Yeahs
