= Young Guns (Lewi White song) =

Single by Lewi White featuring Ed Sheeran, Yasmin, Griminal and Devlin
- Released: 8 July 2011
- Recorded: 2011
- Genre: Hip hop; grime
- Length: 3:18
- Label: 360 Records
- Songwriters: Lewi White; Ed Sheeran; James Devlin; Joshua Ramsey; Jake Gosling
- Producer: Lewi White

Lewi White singles chronology
"Sideline" (2008)	"Young Guns" (2010)

Ed Sheeran singles chronology
"The A Team" (2011)	"Young Guns" (2011)	"You Need Me, I Don't Need You" (2011)

Yasmin singles chronology
"Finish Line" (2011)	"Young Guns" (2011)	"Light Up (The World)" (2012)

Griminal singles chronology
"Supa Dupa" (2010)	"Young Guns" (2011)

Devlin singles chronology
"Let It Go" (2011)	"Young Guns" (2011)	"Watchtower" (2012)

Music video
- "Young Guns" on YouTube

"Young Guns" is a single by British record producer Lewi White, featuring vocals from Ed Sheeran, Yasmin, Griminal, and Devlin. It was released on 8 July 2011 as a digital download in the United Kingdom.

== Music video ==
A music video to accompany the release of "Young Guns" was first released onto YouTube on 10 June 2011. The video was directed by Carly Cussen.

The music video stars Sheeran, Yasmin, Griminal and Devlin in a laboratory being tested on with White as a scientist. The theme of the video is based on the four elements. Sheeran being fire, Yasmin being air/wind, Griminal being earth and Devlin being water.

== Track listing ==
Digital download – EP
No.	Title	Length
1.	"Young Guns" (Full Version)	3:31
2.	"Young Guns" (Full Instrumental)	3:31
3.	"Young Guns" (Radio Edit)	3:18
4.	"Young Guns" (Radio Instrumental)	3:18
5.	"Young Guns" (Music Video)	3:24

== Chart performance ==
Chart (2011)	Peak position
UK Singles (OCC)	86
UK Indie (OCC)	10
UK Hip Hop/R&B (OCC)	24

== Release history ==
Region	Date	Format	Label
United Kingdom	8 July 2011	Digital download	360
