= Light Up (The World) =

Single by Yasmin featuring Shy FX and Ms. Dynamite
- Released: 15 January 2012
- Recorded: 2011
- Length: 3:35
- Label: Ministry of Sound
- Songwriters: Yasmin Shahmir; Andre Williams; Niomi McLean-Daley; Ian Michael Greenidge
- Producer: Shy FX

Yasmin singles chronology
"Young Guns" (2011)	"Light Up (The World)" (2012)	"Real" (2013)

Shy FX singles chronology
"Raver" (2010)	"Light Up (The World)" (2012)	"Soon Come" (2013)

Ms. Dynamite singles chronology
"Teardrop" (2011)	"Light Up (The World)" (2012)	"Gold Dust" (2013)

"Light Up (The World)" is a song recorded by British artist Yasmin, featuring Shy FX and Ms. Dynamite. The song was released on 15 January 2012 for digital download in the United Kingdom as Yasmin's third single.

== Music video ==
A music video to accompany the release of "Light Up (The World)" was first released onto YouTube on 11 November 2011 at a total length of three minutes and thirty-six seconds. The video was filmed in Cuba, and also features Ms Dynamite.

== Live performances ==
She first premiered the song at The Wickerman Festival in Scotland on July 22, 2011.

== Track listing ==
Digital download
No.	Title	Length
1.	"Light Up (The World)" (Radio Edit)	3:35
2.	"Light Up (The World)"	5:07
3.	"Light Up (The World)" (MJ Cole Remix)	7:00
4.	"Light Up (The World)" (Freemasons Club mix)	7:54
5.	"Light Up (The World)" (Benny Page Remix)	4:08

CD single
No.	Title	Length
1.	"Light Up (The World)" (Radio Edit)	3:35
2.	"Light Up (The World)"	5:07
3.	"Light Up (The World)" (MJ Cole Remix)	7:00
4.	"Light Up (The World)" (Freemasons Club mix)	7:54
5.	"Light Up (The World)" (Benny Page Remix)	4:08
6.	"Light Up (The World)" (MJ Cole Dub)	5:33
7.	"Light Up (The World)" (Freemasons Radio Edit)	3:50

== Chart performance ==
Chart (2012)	Peak position
UK Dance (Official Charts)	10
UK Indie (Official Charts)	6
UK Singles (Official Charts)	50

== Release history ==
Region	Date	Format
United Kingdom	15 January 2012	Digital download
