= Finish Line (Yasmin song) =

Single by Yasmin
- Released: 8 May 2011
- Recorded: 2011
- Genre: Trip hop; electronic; R&B
- Length: 3:59
- Label: Ministry of Sound
- Songwriter(s): Yasmin Shahmir
- Producer(s): Labrinth; Marc Williams

Yasmin singles chronology
"On My Own" (2011)	"Finish Line" (2011)	"Young Guns" (2011)

"Finish Line" is a song recorded by British artist Yasmin. Self-written, produced by Labrinth and co-produced by Marc Williams and featuring a sample from the Stevie Wonder song "As". The song was released on 8 May 2011 as Yasmin's second single.

== Background ==
"It was the first song that I made where I really felt like I'd found my own sound and who I wanted to be as an artist. It's a really important song in my career, it's really important to me and got a lot of people interested in me."

—Yasmin, talking about her second single "Finish Line"

"Finish Line" came about after Yasmin was in studio with her friend, Labrinth in January 2010. The two struggled for eight hours before beginning work on the song. Yasmin originally wrote and composed the whole song acoustically before Labrinth begun production work on it. Yasmin has revealed that it took about thirty minutes for her to write the song. The song was co-produced by Labrinth's manager, Marc Williams. The song resulted in Yasmin becoming Level Entertainment's first signed artist after she played "Finish Line" to the label's co-director and BBC Radio 1Xtra presenter, Twin B.

In mid February 2011, a snippet of the final studio version of "Finish Line" was released onto the internet after Yasmin performed the song live at various gigs. The official radio edit for the song was then uploaded on 14 March 2011. On 20 April, "Finish Line" was A-listed on BBC Radio 1. Remixes of "Finish Line" by Freemasons, Mike Delinquent and Shy FX were also released. In an interview with SoulCulture, Yasmin explained how the Freemasons Remix came about as well as her opinion of the remix:

I suggested the Freemasons when discussing remix ideas with the label and luckily for me the guys loved the song and went right ahead making an incredible floorfiller-esque remix, [...], the guys told me they were so inspired by the track they wanted to do an alternative afterhours chilled out version which I was more than happy for them to do considering the calibre of the uptempo mix. When I finally heard this Afterhours Mix, I was blown away, it's even more magical than I expected. This remix has some of the most beautiful and evoking production I've heard in a long time, reminds me so much of Massive Attack and Portishead, they just really nailed it.

== Critical reception ==
"Finish Line" has been positively reviewed by music critics. Ciarán Gaynor of State.ie said that "Finish Line" proves many wrong who say that pop music is all the same. Gaynor complimented the song's good tune and sharp production. He went on to describe the drum sound on the track as "ace" and also highlighted: "'Finish Line' is not auto-tuney, and not full of those bright David Guetta house sounds that people complain about and so it's something of a bit of fresh air." Robert Copsey from Digital Spy praised how "Finish Line", unlike most break-up songs, is able to dress up a break-up as a cool and sophisticated pop track, "a feat too great for even the most established of artists." Copsey went on to describe the song's synths as "heart warming" and Yasmin's vocals as "radio-friendly". Cameron Rawson from Sound Of The Day was impressed by Yasmin's "soft tone" and "vibrant voice" on the song. Rawson felt Labrinth's hard work paid off in the "sweet production" on the record. He also highlighted: "If this is the sort of quality Yasmin is releasing now, in a few years time she will be huge - mark my words." Nyasha Edwards of Urban Development felt that "Finish Line" shows a more softer, mildly sentimental side to Yasmin than her previous single, "On My Own", did.

== Chart performance ==
"Finish Line" first charted on 15 May 2011, when it debuted at number 13 on the UK Singles Chart; marking Yasmin's highest charting single to date. The single also debuted at number-one on the UK Indie Chart, knocking "Unorthodox" by Wretch 32 from the summit. On its second week charting, the single fell 7 places to number 20; falling a further 10 places to number 30 on 29 May. "Finish Line" spent only a single week at the summit of the independent chart, with Adele returning to the top spot on 22 May with "Someone Like You".

== Live performances ==
Yasmin performed "Finish Line" in January 2011 in an acoustic session for The Sun's 'The Biz Sessions'. She also performed "On My Own" and a cover of Ellie Goulding's "Starry Eyed" (2010). "Finish Line" was also performed by Yasmin when she was the supporting act for British artists Example's 2010 tour, and Eliza Doolittle's 2011 tour of the United Kingdom.

== Track listing ==
- Digital download
1. "Finish Line" (Radio Edit) – 3:59
2. "Finish Line" (Freemasons Pegasus Club Mix) – 9:23
3. "Finish Line" (Mike Delinquent Project Remix) – 4:29
4. "Finish Line" (Shy's Smoking Rabbit Mix) – 4:48
5. "Finish Line" (Freemasons Pegasus After Hours Mix) – 6:01
6. "Finish Line" (Acoustic Mix) – 4:02
- 12" (I)
1. "Finish Line" (Freemasons Pegasus Club Mix) – 9:23
2. "Finish Line" (Freemasons Pegasus Dub) – 8:46
- 12" (II)
1. "Finish Line" (Mike Delinquent Project Remix) – 4:29
2. "Finish Line" (Shy's Smoking Rabbit Mix) – 4:48
- "Finish Line" (Freemason's Pegasus Radio Edit) - single
1. "Finish Line" (Freemason's Pegasus Radio Edit) - 3:25
- Promo CD single
1. "Finish Line" (Radio Edit) – 3:59
2. "Finish Line" (Freemasons Pegasus Club Mix) – 9:23
3. "Finish Line" (Mike Delinquent Project Remix) – 4:29
4. "Finish Line" (Shy's Smoking Rabbit Mix) – 4:48
5. "Finish Line" (Pegasus After Hours Mix) – 6:01
6. "Finish Line" (Freemason's Pegasus Radio Edit) - 3:25
7. "Finish Line" (Original Extended Edit) - 4:50
8. "Finish Line" (Instrumental Edit) - 3:57

== Charts ==
Chart (2011)	Peak position
Scotland (OCC)	16
UK Indie (OCC)	1
UK Singles (OCC)	13

== Release history ==
List of release dates, record label and format details
Region	Date	Format	Label
United Kingdom	8 May 2011	Digital download	Ministry of Sound
United Kingdom	9 May 2011	12"	Ministry of Sound
United States	November 22, 2011	Digital download	Ministry of Sound
