= Rewind (Devlin song) =

Single by Devlin featuring Diane Birch

from the album A Moving Picture
- Released: 24 January 2013
- Recorded: 2012
- Length: 3:41
- Label: Island, Universal
- Songwriters: Devlin, Diane Birch, Thomas Barnes, Peter Kelleher, Ben Kohn, Ruth-Anne Cunningham
- Producer: TMS

Devlin singles chronology
"Off with Their Heads" (2012)	"Rewind" (2013)	"50 Grand" (2015)

Diane Birch singles chronology
"Wind Up Bird Song" (2011)	"Rewind" (2013)

Music video
- "Rewind" on YouTube

"Rewind" is a song by English rapper Devlin, featuring vocals from Diane Birch. The song was released as a digital download on 24 January 2013 as the third single from his second studio album A Moving Picture (2013). The song was written by Devlin, Diane Birch, Richard Duffy, Thomas Barnes, Peter Kelleher, Ben Kohn, Ruth-Anne Cunningham and produced by TMS. It peaked at number 10 on the UK Singles Chart.

In the song, Devlin reflects on himself, taking on more mature and sensitive themes of loss and personal darkness. He stated to 4music, "If I could rewind and have some people that I've lost – some friends and my relatives – see me be successful and grow into a young man, I would've loved them to have been here right now."

== Music video ==
A music video to accompany the release of "Rewind" was first released onto YouTube on 12 December 2012 at a total length of three minutes and forty-three seconds.

== Track listing ==
Digital download
No.	Title	Length
1.	"Rewind" (feat. Diane Birch)	3:41
2.	"Rewind" (feat. Diane Birch) (Nu:Logic Remix)	4:58
3.	"Rewind" (feat. Diane Birch) (Kat Krazy Remix)	3:35
4.	"Rewind" (feat. Diane Birch) (Instrumental)	3:41

== Credits and personnel ==
- Vocals – Devlin, Diane Birch
- Producer – TMS
- Lyrics – Devlin, Diane Birch, Thomas Barnes, Peter Keheller, Ben Kohn, Ruth-Anne Cunningham
- Label – Island Records, Universal Music Group

== Chart performance ==
=== Weekly charts ===
Chart (2013)	Peak position
Scotland Singles (OCC)	11
UK Dance (OCC)	3
UK Singles (OCC)	10

== Release history ==
Region	Date	Format	Label
United Kingdom	24 January 2013	Digital download	Island Records, Universal Music Group
