= Yasmin (musician) =

- Also known as: Yasmin
- Born: Yasmin Shahmir; 21 December 1988 (age 37); Ashington, Northumberland, England
- Origin: Northumberland, England
- Genres: Trip hop; R&B; electronic
- Occupations: Producer; songwriter; DJ
- Instruments: Vocals; keyboard; synthesizer
- Years active: 2009–present
- Labels: Levels; Ministry of Sound; Data

Yasmin Shahmir (born 21 December 1988), who performs under the mononym Yasmin, is an English singer, songwriter and DJ. She is signed to record label Levels Entertainment, an imprint of Ministry of Sound and began her singing career in October 2010 when she appeared on rapper Devlin's single "Runaway". Her debut single, "On My Own", was released on 30 January 2011.

== Career ==
=== Early history ===
Yasmin Shahmir was born on 21 December 1988 in Ashington, England to an Iranian father and English mother. She lived in Manchester and at a young age moved to Kilmacolm, near Glasgow in Scotland.

Yasmin began her musical career when she was seventeen years old. She left university, moving to London, where she focused on DJing. During her time in London, Yasmin was spotted and asked to DJ for many artists, including N*E*R*D, POB and Taio Cruz.

=== Breakthrough (2009–present) ===
Throughout September and October 2010, Yasmin supported British rapper Example on his headline tour of the United Kingdom, alongside Devlin and singer-songwriter Ed Sheeran. Yasmin was then featured on Devlin's second official single, "Runaway", for which Yasmin wrote and provided vocals for the chorus. The single was released in the United Kingdom on 24 October 2010, where it debuted at number 15 on the UK Singles Chart, peaking at number 18 in Scotland and number 48 in Europe.

Following the success of the single, Yasmin was signed to Levels Entertainment. She released her debut single "On My Own" through Ministry of Sound in the United Kingdom on 30 January 2011; where it debuted at number 39 on the UK Singles Chart. Her second solo release, "Finish Line" produced by Labrinth, was released on 8 May 2011.

She premiered her next single, "Light Up (The World)" which features Ms Dynamite at The Wickerman Festival in Scotland on 22 July 2011.

Yasmin supported Ellie Goulding on her Halcyon UK tour. She featured on Gorgon City's breakthrough single "Real", taken from their debut album Sirens (2014). Yasmin has also collaborated with the likes of Major Lazer, Bloc Party frontman Kele Okereke and emerging house artist Friend Within.

== Discography ==
=== Singles ===
| Title | Year | Peak chart positions | | | Album |
| Title | Year | UK | UK Indie | SCO | Album |
|---|---|---|---|---|---|
| "On My Own" | 2011 | 39 | 6 | 63 | —N/a |
| "Finish Line" | 2011 | 13 | 1 | 16 | —N/a |
| "Light Up (The World)" (featuring Shy FX and Ms. Dynamite) | 2012 | 50 | 6 | — | —N/a |
| "Didn't Know" (with Digital Farm Animals) | 2015 | — | — | — | —N/a |
| "Lost In Space" (with Tayrell) | 2023 | — | — | — | —N/a |
| "Real High" | 2024 | — | — | — | —N/a |
"—" denotes single that did not chart or were not released.

=== As featured artist ===
| Title | Year | Peak chart positions | | | Album |
| Title | Year | UK | BEL (FL) | SCO | Album |
|---|---|---|---|---|---|
| "Runaway" (Devlin featuring Yasmin) | 2010 | 15 | — | 18 | Bud, Sweat and Beers |
| "Young Guns" (Lewi White featuring Ed Sheeran, Devlin, Griminal and Yasmin) | 2011 | 86 | — | — | Non-album single |
| "Real" (Gorgon City featuring Yasmin) | 2013 | 44 | 49 | — | Sirens |
| "True" (Drums of Death featuring Yasmin) | 2013 | — | — | — | True |
| "One Night Only" (Krystal Klear featuring Yasmin) | 2014 | — | — | — | Non-album single |
| "Circles" (GRMM featuring Yasmin) | 2014 | — | — | — | Non-album single |
| "Feeling U" (Sonny Fodera featuring Yasmin) | 2015 | — | — | — | Non-album single |
| "Supernaturally" (Preditah featuring Yasmin) | 2015 | — | — | — | Non-album single |
| "How Do I Love You" (Infinity Ink featuring Yasmin) | 2016 | — | — | — | Non-album single |
| "Rushing Back" (Infinity Ink featuring Yasmin) | 2019 | — | — | — | Non-album single |
| "—" denotes single that did not chart or were not released. | | | | | Non-album single |

=== Other appearances ===
| Year | Song | Album | Label |
|---|---|---|---|
| 2012 | "Paper Princess" (Mikill Pane featuring Yasmin) | You Guest It EP | SB.TV |
| 2012 | "Incredible" (David Stewart featuring Yasmin) | Late Night Viewing | SB.TV |
| 2012 | "Jive" (Yvonne Heinemann featuring Yasmin & Dean Oram) | Pump It Up - Latin House | Ministry of Sound |
| 2013 | "You're No Good" (Major Lazer featuring Santigold, Vybz Kartel, Danielle Haim and Yasmin) | Free the Universe | Mad Decent |
| 2013 | "Feeling (So Special)" (Karma Kid and Friend Within featuring Yasmin) | Red Bull Studios Presents: Monki and Friends EP | Red Bull |
| 2014 | "LiT" (Flatbush Zombies featuring Yasmin) | It's All a Matter of Perspective EP | Electric KoolAde Records |
| 2014 | "Ride" (Topaz Jones featuring Yasmin) | Non-album single | Self-released |
| 2014 | "First Impressions" (Kele featuring Yasmin) | Trick | Lilac Records |
| 2014 | "Say My Name" (Huxley featuring Yasmin) | Blurred | Aus Music |
| 2015 | "L.E.D." (Chuck Inglish featuring Yasmin) | Everybody's Big Brother | Sounds Like Fun Records |
