= Watchtower (song) =

Single by Devlin featuring Ed Sheeran

from the album A Moving Picture
- Released: 16 August 2012
- Genre: Hip hop; rap rock
- Length: 3:39
- Label: Universal; Island
- Songwriters: James Devlin; Ed Sheeran; Timothy McKenzie; Bob Dylan; Jimi Hendrix
- Producer: Labrinth

Devlin singles chronology
"Young Guns" (2011)	"Watchtower" (2012)	"Off with Their Heads" (2012)

Ed Sheeran singles chronology
"Dreamers" (2012)	"Watchtower" (2012)	"Give Me Love" (2012)

Audio sample
- "Watchtower": file; help

Music video
- "Watchtower" on YouTube

"Watchtower" is a song by British rapper Devlin, released as the lead single from his second studio album, A Moving Picture (2013). The song features British singer-songwriter Ed Sheeran and was produced by Labrinth. "Watchtower" was released on 16 August 2012 and entered the UK Singles Chart on 26 August 2012 at number 7, becoming Devlin's highest-charting single and first top 10 hit and Sheeran's fifth top 10 hit. The song samples the main chorus line from Bob Dylan's "All Along the Watchtower". It also borrows Jimi Hendrix's riff from the guitarist's cover.

== Use in media ==
It was used in the 2013 action-comedy film 2 Guns. The instrumental was also used as the main theme for the series The Young Pope and the final one third of its sequel, The New Pope. It was also used in early promotional trailers for the Amazon Prime streaming television series Tom Clancy's Jack Ryan, which was released in 2018. It was used in the AppleTv film, "The Gorge" 2025 (Instrumental version).

== Music video ==
The official music video was uploaded onto Devlin's Vevo on 4 July 2012. It was directed by Corin Hardy.

== Track listing ==
- Digital download
1. "Watchtower" (radio edit) (featuring Ed Sheeran) – 3:39
2. "London City Part II" – 2:52
3. "My Moving Picture" – 3:52
4. "Watchtower" (instrumental) – 4:32

== Charts ==
Chart (2012–17)	Peak position
France (SNEP)	177
Hungary (Single Top 40)	26
Ireland (IRMA)	73
Scotland Singles (OCC)	9
UK Dance (OCC)	3
UK Singles (OCC)	7

== Certifications ==
Region	Certification	Certified units/sales
United Kingdom (BPI)	Silver	200,000^{‡}
^{‡} Sales+streaming figures based on certification alone.
