= Sparrow (Emeli Sandé song) =

2019 single by Emeli Sandé

Single by Emeli Sandé

from the album Real Life
- Released: 15 March 2019
- Studio: The Church (Crouch End, London); Abbey Road (St John's Wood, London)
- Genre: Soul
- Length: 4:06
- Label: Virgin EMI
- Songwriter(s): Adele Sandé; Laidi Saliasi
- Producer(s): Troy Miller; Emeli Sandé (co.)

Emeli Sandé singles chronology
"Bungee Jumping" (2018)	"Sparrow" (2019)	"Extraordinary Being" (2019)

Music video
- "Sparrow" on YouTube

"Sparrow" is a song by Scottish singer-songwriter Emeli Sandé. It was released on 15 March 2019 by Virgin EMI Records as the lead single from her third studio album, Real Life. "Sparrow" was written by Sandé primarily, with Laidi Saliasi credited as an additional songwriter. The track was produced by percussionist Troy Miller, with Sandé serving as a co-producer. The song, a power ballad with gospel influences, features lyrics which Sandé described as being inspired by the "intoxicating positivity" of Nigerian musician Fela Kuti.

== Background and recording ==
Sandé sent demos of the song to producer Troy Miller, who she was familiar with due to his work with British musician Laura Mvula. Sandé referred to wanting a "militant, marching beat" prominent in the track. Miller wrote the string arrangements for "Sparrow", and recorded the instrumentation with the London Symphony Orchestra at Abbey Road Studios in London.

== Release ==
The track was first announced through Sandé's Twitter account on 11 March 2019, four days prior to release. "Sparrow" was released on 15 March 2019 through British record label Virgin EMI Records, as the lead single from Sandé's upcoming third studio album. It was sent to radio formats that same day, and premiered through Zoe Ball's breakfast radio show on BBC Radio 2. On the same day, Sandé performed "Sparrow" live on 15 March 2019 at Elstree Studios for the charity telethon event Comic Relief.

== Music video ==
The music video for "Sparrow" was released on 26 March 2019. The video, directed by Sarah McColgan and edited by Ernie Gilbert, was shot in New York City. According to Elle, the video "explores themes of strength, movement and freedom".

== Credits and personnel ==
Credits adapted from YouTube, provided by Universal Music Group.

- Emeli Sandé – lead vocals, music production
- Troy Miller – music production, recording engineering, mix engineering, vocal arrangement, string arrangement, drums, piano, Hammond organ, Moog Taurus, baritone guitar
- Dani Spragg – recording engineering
- Robbie Nelson – recording engineering
- Jonathan Allen – recording engineering
- Miles Showell – mastering
- Priscilla Jones-Campbell – background vocals, choir
- Subrina McCalla – background vocals
- Adeola Shyllon – background vocals
- Joy Farruka – choir
- Cherri Kirton – choir
- Phebe Edwards – choir
- Marsha Morrison – choir
- Heavily Sapong – choir
- James Thompson – choir
- Xavier Barnet – choir
- Jaz Ellington – choir
- Clare Duckworth – violin
- Ginette Decuyper – violin
- Laura Dixon – violin
- Gerald Gregory – violin
- Maxine Kwok-Adams – violin
- Claire Parfitt – violin
- Sylvain Vasseur – violin
- Julian Gil Rodriguez – violin
- Thomas Norris – violin
- Matthew Gardner – violin
- Belinda Mcfarlane – violin
- Iwona Muszynska – violin
- Csilla Pogany – violin
- Edward Vanderspar – viola
- Malcolm Johnston – viola
- Anna Bastow – viola
- German Clavijo – viola
- Carol Ella – viola
- Robert Turner – viola
- Rebecca Gilliver – cello
- Alastair Blayden – cello
- Noel Bradshaw – cello
- Eve-Marie Caravassilis – cello
- Daniel Gardner – cello
- Hilary Jones – cello
- Colin Paris – double bass
- Patrick Laurence – double bass
- Matthew Gibson – double bass

== Charts ==
Chart (2019)	Peak position
Scotland (OCC)	50
UK Singles Downloads (OCC)	53

== Release history ==
Country	Date	Format	Label	Ref.
Various	15 March 2019	Digital download, streaming	Virgin EMI	
