= Real Life (Emeli Sandé album) =

Studio album by Emeli Sandé
- Released: 13 September 2019
- Recorded: Spark Studios (London, UK)
- Genre: Gospel; soul; pop
- Length: 44:15
- Label: Virgin EMI
- Producer: Troy Miller

Emeli Sandé chronology
Kingdom Coming (2017)	Real Life (2019)	Let's Say for Instance (2022)

Singles from Real Life
- 1. "Sparrow" Released: 15 March 2019; 2. "Extraordinary Being" Released: 22 May 2019; 3. "Shine" Released: 12 July 2019; 4. "You Are Not Alone" Released: 30 August 2019

Real Life is the third studio album by Scottish singer Emeli Sandé, released on 13 September 2019 by Virgin EMI Records. Sandé co-wrote all tracks on the album, and the album was produced by Troy Miller. It includes the singles "Sparrow", "Extraordinary Being", "Shine" and "You Are Not Alone".

== Background ==
Sandé's intent is to inspire "hope and confidence" with the album, particularly for those "who have been marginalised, forgotten or kicked down by this invisible oppression that's always there."

== Critical reception ==
Professional ratings
Review scores
Source	Rating
AllMusic	3.5/5 stars
Belfast Telegraph	9/10
Classic Pop	7/10
Evening Standard	3/5 stars
The Music	3.5/4 stars

Lucy Mapstone from Scottish daily newspaper The National wrote that "Sande's first two albums hit number one and number two in the charts respectively, so she has a lot to live up to. But, honestly, this may be her best work yet [...] Having gone through a period of difficulty in her life, Sandé has come out the other side and, across this new collection, she rises like the proverbial phoenix with tunes that are a new level of epic, all melodic and uplifting and hymn-like with the odd Motown or gospel influence thrown in where appropriate." AllMusic editor Andy Kellman rated Real Life three and a half stars out of five. He felt that the album "aims to alleviate, uplift, and motivate [..] Like Sandé's two previous studio albums, it's based in mature pop, but its integration of other genres and styles — a little reggae, some blues, disco, and more gospel than ever — is done with more finesse. The seamlessness, combined with full-hearted vocal performances, counteracts all the platitudes and flying-bird-as-freedom metaphors."

Classic Pop's Wyndham Wallace felt that "Sandé doesn't appear interested in breaking new ground when she can preserve and revere old territory: Real Life immerses her in gospel soul traditions, with massed voices integral to its style, so if you're comfortable with formulas, you won't begrudge her being formulaic." In his review for Evening Standard Jochan Embley found that "Real Life is far from adventurous in terms of its songwriting — too often, the structures seem slightly by-the-numbers. The tense, ascending strings towards the end of "Honest" are the closest we get to experimentation and are compelling enough to make you wish Sandé had taken similar risks elsewhere. That said, by clinging on to her soul-inflected roots, Sandé manages to avoid any modern pop tropes, which at least gives the album a disarming authenticity."

== Commercial performance ==
In the UK, the album debuted at number six with sales of 7,650 combined units.

== Track listing ==
All music is composed by Troy Miller.

Real Life track listing
No.	Title	Writer(s)	Co-producer	Length
1.	"Human"	Emeli Sandé; Nana G Boateng	Sandé	4:53
2.	"Love to Help"	Sandé; Laidi Saliasi		4:08
3.	"You Are Not Alone"	Sandé; Salaam Remi; James Poyser		3:52
4.	"Shine"	Sandé		3:29
5.	"Sparrow"	Sandé; Saliasi	Sandé	4:06
6.	"Honest"	Sandé; Troy Miller	Sandé	3:28
7.	"Survivor"	Sandé; Saliasi		4:45
8.	"Extraordinary Being"	Sandé; Miller; Saliasi		4:04
9.	"Same Old Feeling"	Sandé; Saliasi; Jacob McKenzie; Christopher Hanlon		3:37
10.	"Real Life"	Sandé; Saliasi		3:58
11.	"Free as a Bird"	Sandé; Saliasi; Mckenzie		3:55
Total length:				44:15

== Charts ==
Chart performance for Real Life
Chart (2019)	Peak position
Australian Digital Albums (ARIA)	31
Belgian Albums (Ultratop Flanders)	25
Belgian Albums (Ultratop Wallonia)	136
Dutch Albums (Album Top 100)	50
German Albums (Offizielle Top 100)	31
Irish Albums (IRMA)	37
Scottish Albums (OCC)	2
Spanish Albums (PROMUSICAE)	60
Swiss Albums (Schweizer Hitparade)	9
UK Albums (OCC)	6
US Top Current Album Sales (Billboard)	79

== Release history ==
Release history for Real Life
Country	Release date	Label(s)
United Kingdom	13 September 2019	Virgin EMi
