= A Moving Picture =

Studio album by Devlin
- Released: 4 February 2013
- Recorded: 2011–13
- Genre: British hip hop; grime
- Length: 46:58 (standard edition); 1:02:32 (deluxe edition)
- Label: Island; Universal
- Producer: Robbie Lamond; Labrinth; Kraze; Lewi White; Parallel; Future Cut; Naughty Boy; TMS; Utters; Ayana; Balistiq

Devlin chronology
Bud, Sweat and Beers (2010)	A Moving Picture (2013)	The Devil In (2017)

Singles from A Moving Picture
- 1. "Watchtower" Released: 20 August 2012; 2. "Off with Their Heads" Released: 10 October 2012; 3. "Rewind" Released: 28 January 2013

A Moving Picture is the second studio album by English rapper Devlin, released on 4 February 2013 via Island Records and Universal Music Group. The album was produced by various producers, including Labrinth, Kraze, Lewi White, TMS, Future Cut and Naughty Boy. Featured guests on the album include Katy B, Ed Sheeran, Wretch 32, Diane Birch, Etta Bond and Chasing Grace.

== Background ==
Devlin stated in an interview with Digital Spy that the standard version of the album will contain between sixteen and eighteen tracks, and that the deluxe edition could contain up to twenty-two. A total of twenty four tracks have been recorded for possible inclusion on the album. An exclusive version of the album will be available to purchase through Devlin's official website. This version of the album includes a DVD which contains an exclusive documentary on the making of the album, and an extended version of the 'Watchtower' music video, made into a short film. The short film features appearances from Jaime Winstone, Neil Maskell, Tilly Vosburgh, and George Russo, in a cinematic thriller with Devlin and Ed Sheeran in the lead roles. This version of the album will also come with an exclusive poster.

== Critical reception ==
Professional ratings
Aggregate scores
Source	Rating
Metacritic	51/100
Review scores
Source	Rating
The Arts Desk	3/5 stars
Clash	5/10
The Guardian	3/5 stars
MusicOMH	2.5/5 stars
NME	1/5 stars
The Observer	3/5 stars
RapReviews	4.5/10
Time Out	2/5 stars

According to the review aggregator Metacritic, A Moving Picture received "mixed or average reviews" based on a weighted average score of 51 out of 100 from 11 critic scores.

Robert Corpsey of Digital Spy awarded the album three out of five stars, and said the following of the album: "Opener 'Sun Goes Down' picks up where Devlin left off and magnifies it x10, employing weighty beats and a haunting string section to match angry verses that are instantly lifted by the Katy B-assisted chorus. The aggression that made his debut so fascinating rears its head again on 'Off With Their Heads' and closer 'The Garden', the latter a razor-sharp, chorus-less affair where he sounds at his most comfortable. Frustratingly, it's the set's more chart-friendly cuts that let it down. The trancey bleeps on 'Love Cards' and watery production on his latest single 'Rewind' make him sound like an artist that's trying to fit in rather than stand out."

== Singles ==
"Watchtower" was released on 20 August 2012, as the lead single from the album. The track features vocals from Ed Sheeran, was produced by Labrinth and features a sample of the original version, recorded by Bob Dylan. The music video was recorded in the form of a short film, with edited versions being used for television airplay. It peaked at No. 7 on the UK Singles Chart, becoming Devlin's most successful single to date. "Off with Their Heads" was released on 10 October 2012, as the second single from the album. The track features vocals from fellow rapper Wretch 32, and was released shortly after its premiere on BBC Radio 1 Xtra. The music video features Devlin and Wretch performing the track in a deserted underground warehouse. It peaked at No. 34 on the UK Dance Singles Chart. "Rewind" was released a week prior to the album, on 28 January 2013. The track samples the original version of the track, and features vocals from the original artist, Diane Birch. It was originally due for release on 22 October 2012, but was delayed as the album was also pushed back until 2013. Devlin premiered the song during his gig as part of the BBC Radio 1Xtra festival during the first week of November 2012.

== Track listing ==
Standard Edition
No.	Title	Writer(s)	Producer(s)	Length
1.	"Sun Goes Down" (featuring Katy B)	Devlin, Katy B, Robbie Lamond	Robbie Lamond, Future Cut	4:11
2.	"Really Cold"	Devlin, Emily Phillips, Ant Whiting	Ant Whiting	3:47
3.	"(All Along the) Watchtower" (featuring Ed Sheeran)	Devlin, Sheeran, Timothy McKenzie, Bob Dylan	Labrinth	4:32
4.	"Off with Their Heads" (featuring Wretch 32)	Devlin, Jermaine Scott, Robbie Lamond	Robbie Lamond	4:03
5.	"Ghost Ship"	Devlin, Jaz Rodgers, Alex Clare	Jaz Rodgers	4:30
6.	"Letter to My Boys"	Devlin, Hugo Chegwin, Harry Craze	Craze & Hoax	4:32
7.	"Mother's Son"	Devlin, Paddy Byrne, Dan Radclyffe	Utters	3:35
8.	"Rewind" (featuring Diane Birch)	Devlin, Diane Birch, Thomas Barnes, Peter Keheller, Ben Kohn, Ruth-Anne Cunningham	TMS	3:41
9.	"Love Cards" (featuring Etta Bond)	Devlin, Etta Bond	Raf Riley	3:52
10.	"Gift & Curse" (featuring Chasing Grace)	Devlin, Chasing Grace	Naughty Boy, Phil Leigh	3:29
11.	"The Cast"	Devlin, Lewi White	Lewi White	3:37
12.	"The Garden"	Devlin, Lewi White	Lewi White	3:07
Total length:				46:58

iTunes Store Deluxe Edition Bonus Tracks
No.	Title	Writer(s)	Producer(s)	Length
13.	"(All Along the) Watchtower" (Acoustic Version)	Devlin, Sheeran, Timothy McKenzie, Bob Dylan	Labrinth	3:49
14.	"Rewind" (Acoustic Version)	Devlin, Diane Birch, Thomas Barnes, Peter Keheller, Ben Kohn, Ruth-Anne Cunningham	TMS	4:19
15.	"Off with Their Heads" (Acoustic Version)	Devlin, Jermaine Scott, Robbie Lamond	Robbie Lamond	3:57
16.	"Sun Goes Down" (Acoustic Version)	Devlin, Katy B, Robbie Lamond	Robbie Lamond, Future Cut	3:43
Total length:				1:02:32

Deluxe Edition Bonus DVD
No.	Title	Length
1.	"A Moving Picture: Making the Album" (Documentary)	--
2.	"Watchtower" (Music Video - Short Film Director's Cut)	--

== Charts ==
Chart (2013)	Peak position
UK Albums Chart	19

== Release history ==
Region	Date	Format	Label
Ireland	4 February 2013	CD, CD + DVD, digital download	Island Records, Universal Music Group
United Kingdom	4 February 2013	CD, CD + DVD, digital download	Island Records, Universal Music Group
