= Off with Their Heads (song) =

Single by Devlin featuring Wretch 32

from the album A Moving Picture
- Released: 10 October 2012
- Genre: Hip hop; grime
- Length: 4:06
- Label: Universal; Island
- Songwriters: James Devlin; Jermaine Scott; Robbie Lamond
- Producer: Drop Lamond

Devlin singles chronology
"Watchtower" (2012)	"Off with Their Heads" (2012)	"Rewind" (2013)

Wretch 32 singles chronology
"Hush Little Baby" (2012)	"Off with Their Heads" (2012)	"Blackout" (2013)

Audio sample
- "Off with Their Heads": file; help

Music video
- "Off with Their Heads" on YouTube

"Off with Their Heads" is a song by British rapper Devlin, released as the second single from Devlin's second studio album A Moving Picture (2013). It was released in the United Kingdom on 10 October 2012 and features British rapper Wretch 32. The song was written by James Devlin and Jermaine Scott and produced by Drop Lamond.

== Music video ==
A music video to accompany the release of "Off With Their Heads" was first released onto YouTube on 21 October 2012 at a total length of four minutes and nineteen seconds.

== Track listing ==
Digital download

1. "Off with Their Heads" (explicit) (featuring Wretch 32) – 4:06
2. "Off with Their Heads" (clean) (featuring Wretch 32) – 4:06

== Credits and personnel ==
- Lead vocals – Devlin, Wretch 32
- Lyrics – James Devlin, Jermaine Scott
- Label: Universal Music Group, Island Records
- Producer: Robbie "Drop" Lamond

== Chart performance ==
Chart (2012)	Peak position
UK Dance (OCC)	34
UK Singles (Official Charts Company)	186

== Release history ==
Region	Date	Format	Label
United Kingdom	10 October 2012	Digital download	Universal Music Group, Island Records
