= Let's Say for Instance =

Studio album by Emeli Sandé
- Released: 6 May 2022
- Genre: Classical; disco; R&B
- Length: 51:34
- Label: Chrysalis
- Producer: Adele Emily Sande; Aquarelle; Booker T; Darren Jones; Fallen; Henri Davies; Naughty Boy; Ollie Green; Prince Galalie; Rachet; Ray Angry; Sam Sumser; Sean Small; Shakaveli

Emeli Sandé chronology
Real Life (2019)	Let's Say for Instance (2022)	How Were We to Know (2023)

Singles from Let's Say for Instance
- 1. "Family" Released: 15 September 2021; 2. "Look What You've Done" Released: 26 October 2021; 3. "Brighter Days" Released: 19 January 2022; 4. "There Isn't Much" Released: 1 April 2022

Let's Say for Instance is the fourth studio album by Scottish singer Emeli Sandé, released on 6 May 2022 through Chrysalis Records. It is Sandé's first release with Chrysalis, and first album on an independent record label. The album was preceded by the release of the singles "Family", "Look What You've Done" (with Jaykae), "Brighter Days" and "There Isn't Much".

== Background and musical style ==
Sandé explained that she "felt free to express [her]self more naturally both lyrically and musically in this album and [her] wish is that it will be an uplifting experience for each listener and that they will get to know [her] on a much deeper level". Upon release in September 2021, lead single "Family" was called a departure from Sandé's previous soul sound "more towards pop", while a press release accompanying the album announcement claimed Sandé "explor[es] new sonic territory through shades of classical, disco, [and] nostalgic R&B".

== Promotion ==
Lead single "Family" was released on 15 September 2021, followed by the Jaykae duet "Look What You've Done" the next month, and "Brighter Days" in January 2022. The album was announced on 15 February 2022. Sandé will promote the album on the Brighter Days Tour, which will visit the UK and Europe across May and June 2022.

== Critical reception ==
Professional ratings
Review scores
Source	Rating
AllMusic	3.5/5 stars
musicOMH	3/5 stars
PopMatters	8/10
The Scotsman	3/5 stars

Fiona Shepherd of The Scotsman rated the album three out of five stars and wrote that "Sandé may talk about soul-baring through her songs but there is an opaqueness to the off-the-peg inspirational messages in her lyrics which allows the listener to project their own experiences into her middle-of-the-road songs". Shepherd felt the track "Brighter Days" sounds like "Dolly Parton in gospel robes" and called "Look in Your Eyes" a "tasteful, mid-paced reverie" with "old school Terry Lewis/Jimmy Jam-style soul funk". Reviewing the album for musicOMH, Martyn Young opined that it "feels like an album perfectly designed for the playlist age [...] even if as a whole work it could do with paring down". He also called it "a record that highlights a gifted songwriter and producer doing what they love and being gently experimental with it", remarking that Sandé is "free from the expectations and pressures of cultural ubiquity", thus she "can carry on doing what she's very good at".

Writing for PopMatters, Peter Piatkowski called the songs on the album "for the most part, smart, uplifting pop songs with the kind of inspirational lyrics that would soothe a wide variety of adversarial circumstances", praising the album's "pleasingly diverse sound" and lyrics "which sound as if they've come from a lifetime of experience", akin to a "boxed set of the best episodes from The Oprah Winfrey Show". Piatkowski further wrote that "Sandé's warmth dominates the record and her songs are like a loving embrace", calling Let's Say for Instance "the soul album we need in these struggle-filled cultural-political times".

== Track listing ==
Let's Say for Instance track listing
No.	Title	Writer(s)	Producer(s)	Length
1.	"Family"	Adele Emily Sande; Henri Davies	Davies	4:04
2.	"Look What You've Done" (with Jaykae)	Sande; Janum Khan	Sande	3:21
3.	"July 25th"	Sande; Yoana Karemova	Sande	1:52
4.	"Oxygen"	Sande; Lee Stashenko	Fallen	3:59
5.	"Summer"	Sande; Davies	Davies	3:56
6.	"My Pleasure"	Sande; Jabulani Sithole; Sarah Eloho	Prince Galalie; Aquarelle	3:06
7.	"There Isn't Much"	Sande; Fredrik Ball; Shahid Khan; Shakil Ashraf	Naughty Boy; Shakaveli	3:47
8.	"September 8th"	Sande; Garfield Booker; Jimmy Hamilton; Maurice Hayes; Teddy Raab	Booker T	0:47
9.	"Look in Your Eyes"	Sande; Booker; Hamilto; Hayes; Raab	Booker T	3:11
10.	"Ready to Love"	Sande; Ollie Green	Green	3:06
11.	"Wait for Me"	Sande; Christopher Hanlon; Jacob McKenzie; Laidi Saliasi; Mike Mayfield	Rachet	2:49
12.	"Another One"	Sande; Stashenko	Fallen	2:29
13.	"Yes You Can"	Sande; Darren Jones; Nicky Brown	Sande; Jones	5:06
14.	"Brighter Days"	Sande; Green; Moyses Dos Santos	Green	2:50
15.	"Superhuman"	Sande; Sam Sumser	Sumser; Sean Small	3:17
16.	"World Go Round"	Sande; Ray Angry	Angry	3:54
Total length:				51:34

== Personnel ==
Musicians

- Emeli Sandé – vocals
- Bryony James – cello
- Rosie Danvers – cello, string arrangement
- Annette Bowen – choir
- Becky Thomas – choir, vocal arrangement
- Christina Matovu – choir
- Dawn Connie Morton-Young – choir
- Josie Nugent – choir
- Kiing Gardner – choir
- Lawrence Rowe – choir
- Olivia Leisk – choir
- Red Farrell – choir
- Simons Brown – choir
- Richard Pryce – double bass
- Tommy Danvers – keyboards
- Emma Owens – viola
- Meghan Cassidy – viola
- Ellie Stanford – violin
- Hayley Pomfrett – violin
- Jenny Sacha – violin
- Patrick Kiernan – violin
- Sarah Sexton – violin
- Steve Morris – violin
- Zara Benyounes – violin
- Oli Morris - saxophone

Technical

- Sam Moses – mastering
- Matt Huber – mixing
- Nick Taylor – string engineering

Artwork

- Jimmy Turrell – artwork
- Shea McChrsytal – design, layout
- Olivia Lifungula – photography

== Charts ==
Chart performance for Let's Say for Instance
Chart (2022)	Peak position
Belgian Albums (Ultratop Flanders)	68
Scottish Albums (OCC)	13
Swiss Albums (Schweizer Hitparade)	41
UK Albums (OCC)	27
UK Independent Albums (OCC)	5
