= Runaway (Devlin song) =

Single by Devlin featuring Yasmin

from the album Bud, Sweat and Beers
- Released: 24 October 2010
- Recorded: 2010
- Genre: British hip hop, grime
- Length: 3:29
- Label: Universal Music Group, Island
- Songwriter(s): J. Devlin, DJ Yasmin, Future Cut
- Producer(s): Future Cut

Devlin singles chronology
"Brainwashed" (2010)	"Runaway" (2010)	"Game Over" (2010)

Yasmin singles chronology
"Runaway" (2010)	"On My Own" (2011)

"Runaway" is the second official single by British MC and rapper, Devlin which features DJ Yasmin (credited as Yasmin). The single was released in October 2010 for digital download.

== Background ==
The song premiered on 28 August 2010 on MistaJam's show, and is the second single from Devlin's debut album, Bud, Sweat and Beers. The song got on the BBC Radio 1 A-list three weeks before release. Yasmin commented on working with Devlin, about the song and about the A-list: "I’m thrilled. It’s amazing. The beauty of the song is that everyone on it did their own part. I’ve known the producers for ages, Devlin wrote all his lyrics, I wrote my chorus, so it feels like we all own a bit of the song. It feels a bit more special when it’s really your work that’s up there. I’m so excited. It shows a lot of support and belief from Radio One that they put it straight onto the C-List, the next week up to the B-List and the next up to the A-List."

== Critical reception ==
Fraser McAlpine of BBC Chart Blog gave the song a positive review stating:

I'll admit to feeling a little sceptical about this fella at first. For all that it was only supposed to be a calling-card, 'Brainwashed' didn't really showcase Devlin's story-telling skills, and apart from a couple of sharp one-liners, it wasn't clear why exactly he was as good as he said he was.

Now I know. It's because he can come up with a line like "burning rubber over gravel until we see the English channel" in the middle of a song like this. A song which is - musically at least - not that startling. Just another four-chord churnaround based loosely on those Pachelbel changes N-Dubz used for 'We Dance On'.

But given the benefit of Dev's precision wordplay, and his urgent delivery, it's transformed into something darkly optimistic, quietly brilliant, and poetic in a really unpoetic way..

== Music video ==
The music video was directed by Emil Nava and was uploaded to YouTube on 10 September 2010. The video starts off with a man burning pictures. Devlin is then seen around the neighborhoods of Dagenham. Yasmin is seen singing from a council estate balcony in the Isles Of Dogs and both Devlin and Yasmin in the middle of a cul-de-sac. Other people are seen running and jumping into the sea.

== Track listing ==
Digital download
No.	Title	Length
1.	"Runaway" (Radio Edit)	3:29
2.	"Runaway" (Nu:Tone + Logistics Mix)	5:31
3.	"Runaway" (Megabits Jazz Club Radio Mix)	3:54
4.	"The O.T Show"	3:18
Total length:		16:12

== Chart performance ==
Runaway debuted at number 15 in the UK Singles Chart on 31 October 2010; beating previous single "Brainwashed" which peaked at number 31. The following week, the single fell to number 21; coincidentally the album Bud, Sweat and Beers was simultaneously at number 21 on the UK Albums Chart. The single also debuted at number 18 on the Scottish Singles and Albums Chart, falling to number 22 on its second week.

=== Weekly charts ===
Chart (2010)	Peak position
European Hot 100 Singles	48
Scotland (OCC)	18
UK Singles (OCC)	15

== Certifications ==
Region	Certification	Certified units/sales
United Kingdom (BPI)	Silver	200,000^{‡}
^{‡} Sales+streaming figures based on certification alone.

== Release history ==
Region	Date	Format
Ireland	24 October 2010	Digital download
United Kingdom	24 October 2010	Digital download
United Kingdom	25 October 2010	CD single
