= Bud, Sweat and Beers =

Studio album by Devlin
- Released: 29 October 2010
- Recorded: 2009–10
- Genre: Grime, British hip hop
- Length: 45:37
- Label: Island, Universal Music Group
- Producer: Labrinth Rachet, Kraze, Lewi White, Futurecut, Naughty Boy, iSHi, TMS

Devlin chronology
Bud, Sweat and Beers (2010)	A Moving Picture (2013)

Singles from Bud, Sweat and Beers
- 1. "Brainwashed" Released: 8 August 2010; 2. "Runaway" Released: 24 October 2010; 3. "Let It Go" Released: 3 January 2011

Professional ratings
Review scores
Source	Rating
AllMusic	3.5/5 stars
Clash	(7/10)
The Independent	3/5 stars
NME	1.5/5 stars
RWD	5/5 stars
Soul Culture	4/5 stars

Bud, Sweat and Beers is the debut studio album released by English rapper Devlin, via Island Records and the Universal Music Group. The album was released on 29 October 2010 via digital download, and 1 November 2010, physically. The album was produced by Labrinth, Kraze, Lewi White, Futurecut and Naughty Boy. Featured guests on the album include Awa Manneh, Hikaru Utada, Labrinth, Emeli Sandé, Yasmin, Dogzilla and Ghetts. The album received high praise in critical reviews, and was awarded Hottest Album of the Week by Zane Lowe.

== Singles ==
"Shot Music" was released as a promotional single on 9 April 2010. The track features vocals from fellow rapper Giggs. The track did not make the final album cut, but did feature on the album's original sampler, issued to radio stations and critics in September 2010. A music video was recorded. "London City" was released as a promotional single on 3 June 2010. The track, which features a sample from Hikaru Utada's song "Passion (After the Battle)", peaked at #181 on the UK Singles Chart, and a music video for the track was filmed and released to music channels. "Brainwashed" was released on 8 August 2010 as the first official single from the album. The track features vocals from British singer-songwriter Awa Manneh. The single went on to debut at #31 on the UK Singles Chart, after being included on the BBC Radio 1 B-list playlist. "Runaway" was released on 24 October 2010 as the second official single from the album. The track features vocals from upcoming British singer-songwriter and DJ Yasmin. The single went on to debut at #16 on the UK Singles Chart, after being included on the BBC Radio 1 A-list playlist. "Let It Go" was released on 24 January 2011 as the third and final official single from the album. The track features vocals from British-producer Labrinth. The single went on to debut at #59 on the UK Singles Chart, after being included on the BBC Radio 1 A-list playlist.

== Track listing ==
No.	Title	Writer(s)	Producer(s)	Length
1.	"1989"	Fabio Pignatelli, James Devlin, Lewis A.F. Hodder, Massimo Morante, Maurizio Guarini	Lewi White	2:49
2.	"Brainwashed" (featuring Awa Manneh)	Ishi Mughal, Emeli Sande, James Devlin, Pontus Hjelm	iSHi	3:21
3.	"Days & Nights"	Chris Butler, James Devlin, Simon Green	Kraze	3:48
4.	"London City"	Chris Butler, James Devlin, Jordan Crisp, Lloyd Perrin, Hikaru Utada	Kraze, James Clowes	3:03
5.	"Marching Through the Fog"	James Devlin, Lewis A.F. Hodder	Lewi White	3:07
6.	"Let It Go" (featuring Labrinth)	James Devlin, Marc Williams, Timothy McKenzie	Labrinth	3:39
7.	"Yesterday's News" (featuring Emeli Sande)	Ben Harrison, James Murray, James Devlin, Mustafa Omer, Shahid Khan	Naughty Boy, Mojam	3:03
8.	"Community Outcast"	James Devlin, Laidi Saliasi, Yasunori Mitsuda	Ratchet	3:40
9.	"Runaway" (featuring Yasmin)	James Devlin, Yasmin Shahmir	Future Cut	3:29
10.	"Our Father"	James Devlin, Justin Clarke, Lewis A.F. Hodder, Rhys Taylor, Samuel Taylor	Lewi White, Rawz Artilla	3:27
11.	"Finally" (featuring Dogzilla and Ghetts)	James Devlin, Justin Clarke, Lewis A.F. Hodder, Rhys Taylor, Samuel Taylor	Lewi White	4:01
12.	"Dreamer" (featuring Emeli Sandé)	Ben Harrison, Emeli Sande, James Devlin, Shahid Khan	Naughty Boy	2:47
13.	"World Still Turns"	Ben Kohn, James Devlin, Peter Kelleher, Ruth-Anne Cunningham, Tom Barnes	TMS	3:00
14.	"End of Days"	Ben Harrison, James Devlin, Shahid Khan	Naughty Boy	2:23
Total length:				45:37

iTunes Store Bonus Track
No.	Title	Writer(s)	Producer(s)	Length
15.	"I Made It" (featuring McLean)	Ben Kohn, James Devlin, Peter Kelleher, Ruth-Anne Cunningham, Tom Barnes	TMS	3:34

== Charts ==
Chart (2010)	Peak position
UK Albums Chart	21
UK R&B Chart	2
UK Download Chart	7

== Release history ==
Region	Date	Format(s)	Label
Various	29 October 2010	Digital download	Island Records, Universal Music Group
Various	1 November 2010	CD	Island Records, Universal Music Group
