= Brainwashed (Devlin song) =

Single by Devlin featuring Milena Sanchez

from the album Bud, Sweat and Beers
- Released: 8 August 2010 (Release History)
- Recorded: 2010
- Genre: British hip hop, rap metal, grime
- Length: 3:24
- Label: Universal Records, Island Records
- Songwriters: James Devlin, Pontus Hjelm, Emeli Sandé
- Producer: iSHi

Devlin singles chronology
"Shot Music" (2010)	"Brainwashed" (2010)	"Runaway" (2010)

Milena Sanchez singles chronology
"Over" (2010)	"Brainwashed" (2010)	"Fearless" (2011)

"Brainwashed" is a song by English rapper Devlin which features vocals from Milena Sanchez. The song, co-written by Pontus Hjelm and Emeli Sandé served as the lead single for the rapper's debut album, Bud, Sweat and Beers (2010). The track was first released as a digital download on 8 August 2010 having been added to BBC Radio 1's B Playlist the previous month.

== Critical reception ==
Fraser McAlpine of BBC Chart Blog gave the song a positive review stating:

Honestly, some people can be so NEEDY.

I mean sure, if you're going to be a pop star, it helps to have the kind of self-regard which occasionally finds you checking out your reflection in the taps on the sink. But to actually BEG your audience to remember who you are – even to go to the lengths of spelling out your name* – and then brag that anyone who does actually bother to do this is clearly being brainwashed by your astonishing talent...

Well that doesn't just take the cake. That takes the cake, the cake-dish, the cake-slice, the table-cloth AND the pretty little seaside teashop..

== Track listing ==
- Digital download

No.	Title	Length
1.	"Brainwashed"	3:24
2.	"Brainwashed (Devlin Edit)"	2:58

== Chart performance ==
Having been predicted to debut in the Top 30, "Brainwashed" eventually debuted at number 31 on 15 August 2010, giving Devlin his first single to crack the UK Singles Chart. On its second week in the chart, the single fell 9 places to number 40 before falling a further 19 places to number 59 on 29 August 2010.

Chart (2010)	Peak position
UK Singles (OCC)	31
UK Hip Hop/R&B (OCC)	11

== Release history ==
Region	Date	Format
United Kingdom	8 August 2010	Digital Download
United Kingdom	9 August 2010	CD single
