= Devlin (rapper) =

English rapper (born 1989)

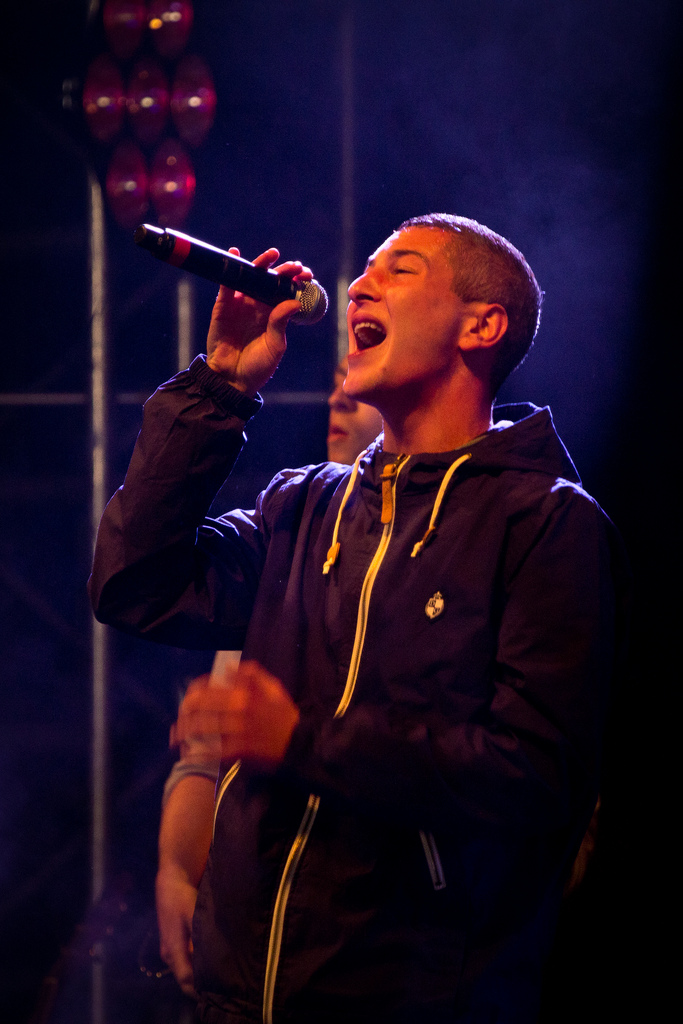
- Devlin performing in Little Malvern in 2011

Background information
- Also known as: Devastation
- Born: James Devlin; 7 May 1989 (age 37); Bermondsey, Southwark, England
- Genres: British hip hop; grime
- Occupations: Rapper; songwriter
- Years active: 2006–present
- Labels: Island Records (2010–2015); Devlin Music (2015–present)
- Formerly of: The Movement

James Devlin (born 7 May 1989), better known mononymously as Devlin, is an English rapper. He was signed to Island Records from 2010 to 2015. He is part of grime collective 'O.T Crew' with Dogzilla, Deeperman, M. Eye, Benson, Kozy, Syer Bars, Shotz, Meshie, Props and Daze. Devlin was a member of the Movement, consisting of himself, Wretch 32, Scorcher, Ghetts, Lightning, Mercston and DJ Unique.

== Early life ==
James Devlin was born on 7 May 1989 in Bermondsey and grew up on a housing estate in Dagenham. His mother was a council worker while his father was a forklift driver. Devlin released his second solo mixtape The Art of Rolling in 2008.

== Career ==
=== 2010–11: Bud, Sweat and Beers ===
Devlin's debut album, Bud, Sweat and Beers was released on Island Records in 2010. The first single from the album was "Brainwashed", which was released on 8 August 2010 in the UK and debuted on the UK Singles Chart at number 31, and number 11 on the UK R&B Chart. The second single, "Runaway", was released on 24 October 2010, where it debuted at number 15, marking Devlin's most successful single to date. The single was succeeded by the release of the debut album, Bud, Sweat and Beers, which was released on 1 November 2010 and debuted at number 21 on the UK Albums Chart. "London City" entered the UK chart at number 181 following strong digital downloads from the album. The third single released from the album was "Let It Go" featuring British producer Labrinth. The track was released on 31 January 2011 and charted at number 59 in the UK.

=== 2011–13: A Moving Picture ===
His second studio album, A Moving Picture, was released on 4 February 2013. It peaked at number 19 on the UK Albums Chart.

== Personal life ==
Devlin is a supporter of Tottenham Hotspur. He is of Irish descent. He has Type 1 Diabetes diagnosed at the age of 14.

== Discography ==
Studio albums

- Bud, Sweat and Beers (2010)
- A Moving Picture (2013)
- The Devil In (2017)
- The Outcast (2019)
- Eyes for the Blind (2022)
- The James Devlin Album (2025)
