= Maverick Sabre discography =

- Studio albums: 5
- Extended plays: 2
- Singles: 18
- Featured singles: 19

The discography of English-Irish vocalist/rapper Maverick Sabre consists of five studio albums, one mixtape, one extended play and eighteen singles (and an additional nineteen as a featured artist).

Sabre released his debut single, "Let Me Go" in the United Kingdom on 22 July 2011. The track peaked at number sixteen on the UK chart, also reaching number twenty-seven and number thirty-eight on the Scottish chart and Irish chart respectively. The release was succeeded by second single, "I Need", which was released on 4 November 2011. The track saw Sabre achieve a second consecutive top twenty hit, peaking at number eighteen in the UK; also reaching number twenty-four and number forty in Scotland and Ireland. The singer's debut studio album, Lonely Are the Brave, was released on 6 February 2012—debuting at number two in the UK and Scotland and number three in Ireland. The album was preceded by the release of a third single, "No One", which peaked at number fifty in the UK.

The singer has also appeared as a featured artist on two occasions, the first on British rapper Professor Green's single "Jungle", taken from the album Alive Till I'm Dead (2010). The track was released on 3 January 2011 in the UK, peaking at number thirty-one. Sabre also appeared alongside Green on True Tiger's "In the Air", which, having been released on 22 June 2011, peaked at number fifty-two.

== Albums ==
=== Studio albums ===
Title	Details	Peak chart positions			Certifications
Title	Details	UK	IRL	SCO	Certifications
Lonely Are the Brave	Released: 27 January 2012; Label: Mercury; Formats: Digital download, CD	2	3	2	BPI: Gold; IRMA Gold
Innerstanding	Released: 30 October 2015; Label: Mercury; Formats: Digital download, CD	41	73	—	
When I Wake Up	Released: 22 March 2019; Label: FAMM; Formats: Digital download, CD, Streaming	46	35	62	
Don't Forget to Look Up	Released: 28 January 2022; Label: FAMM; Formats: Digital download, CD, Streaming	—	—	—	
Burn the Right Things Down	Released: 18 October 2024; Label: FAMM; Formats: Digital download, CD, Streaming	—	—	—	

=== Mixtapes ===
Title	Details
Travelling Man	Released: 25 November 2010

== Extended plays ==
Title	Details
The Lost Words	Released: 7 March 2011; Label: Mercury Records; Format: Digital download
You Know How It Feels	Released: 24 July 2020; Label: FAMM; Format: Digital download

== Singles ==
=== As lead artist ===
Title	Year	Peak chart positions				Certifications	Album
Title	Year	UK	IRL	NZ Hot	SCO	Certifications	Album
"Let Me Go"	2011	16	38	—	27	BPI: Silver	Lonely Are the Brave
"I Need"	2011	18	32	—	24	BPI: Platinum	Lonely Are the Brave
"No One"	2012	50	—	—	—		Lonely Are the Brave
"I Used to Have It All"	2012	—	—	—	—		Lonely Are the Brave
"These Days"	2012	—	—	—	—		Lonely Are the Brave
"Emotion (Ain't Nobody)"	2014	152	—	—	—		Non-album single
"Walk Into the Sun"	2015	—	—	—	—		Innerstanding
"Come Fly Away"	2015	—	—	—	—		Innerstanding
"Follow the Leader" (with George the Poet featuring Jorja Smith)	2018	—	—	—	—		Non-album single
"Drifting"	2018	—	—	—	—		When I Wake Up
"Her Grace" (featuring Chronixx)	2018	—	—	—	—		When I Wake Up
"Slow Down" (featuring Jorja Smith)	2019	—	—	—	—	BPI: Gold	When I Wake Up
"Glory"	2019	—	—	—	—		When I Wake Up
"Lonely Side of Life"	2020	—	—	—	—		Non-album single
"Through It All" (with DJ Zinc)	2020	—	—	—	—		Friends and Fam
"Push on Thru" (with Brady Watt and Ras Kass)	2020	—	—	—	—		Non-album single
"Don't You Know by Now"	2020	—	—	—	—		You Know How It Feels (EP)
"Signs"	2020	—	—	—	—		You Know How It Feels (EP)
"Not Easy Love" (featuring Demae)	2021	—	—	—	—		Don't Forget to Look Up
"Walk These Days"	2021	—	—	—	—		Don't Forget to Look Up
"Good Man"	2022	—	—	—	—		Don't Forget to Look Up
"Roses Ether"	2024	—	—	—	—		Burn the Right Things Down
"If I Could Only Love You Again"	2024	—	—	—	—		Burn the Right Things Down
"Lay Down On Me"	2024	—	—	—	—		Burn the Right Things Down
"I Knew That This Was Love" (with Hedex)	2025	—	—	34	—		Non-album single
"—" denotes a single that did not chart, or was not released in that territory.

=== As featured artist ===
Title	Year	Peak chart positions		Certifications	Album
Title	Year	UK	AUS	Certifications	Album
"Jungle" (Professor Green featuring Maverick Sabre)	2011	31	—	BPI: Gold	Alive Till I'm Dead
"In the Air" (True Tiger featuring Professor Green & Maverick Sabre)	2011	52	—		Non-album single
"Turn Back" (K Koke featuring Maverick Sabre)	2012	70	—		I Ain't Perfect
"Won't Let You Down" (Hilltop Hoods featuring Maverick Sabre)	2014	—	17		Walking Under Stars
"Live and Let Go" (Hilltop Hoods featuring Maverick Sabre and Brother Ali)	2015	—	78		Walking Under Stars
"Rolling with Me (I Got Love)" (SoulCircuit featuring Maverick Sabre)	2015	—	—		Non-album singles
"Trouble" (Sub Focus and Rudimental featuring Chronixx and Maverick Sabre)	2017	—	—		Non-album singles
"All Love" (Paul Alwright featuring Maverick Sabre)	2018	—	—		Hungry
"Call Me" (Shy FX featuring Maverick Sabre)	2018	—	—		Raggamuffin Soundtape
"Coloured Souls" (Natty & the Rebelship featuring Maverick Sabre)	2018	—	—		Non-album single
"Brother, Why You Gotta Love Her" (Liam Bailey featuring Maverick Sabre)	2018	—	—		Brand New
"They Don't Care About Us" (Rudimental featuring Maverick Sabre & YEBBA)	2018	—	—		Toast to Our Differences
"Sell My Soul" (Sigma featuring Maverick Sabre)	2019	—	—		Hope
"Young Kings & Queens" (Foreign Beggars featuring Maverick Sabre and Mali Hayes)	2019	—	—		Matriarchy
"In-between" (Lily Moore featuring Maverick Sabre)	2019	—	—		More Moore Mixtape
"Alchemy" (Manik MC featuring Maverick Sabre)	2020	—	—		Concrete Clouds
"Save Me Now" (DRS & Vangeliez featuring Maverick Sabre)	2020	—	—		Light Language
"Uneven Lives" (Ocean Wisdom featuring Maverick Sabre)	2021	—	—		TBA
"Casio" (Kojaque featuring Maverick Sabre)	2021	—	—		Town's Dead
"Loving You" (Jorja Smith featuring Maverick Sabre)	2024	—	—		Non-album single
"—" denotes a single that did not chart, or was not released in that territory.

=== Promotional singles ===
Single	Year	Album
"I Can Never Be" (Note: The single "I Can Never Be" was selected as iTunes' Single of the Week for the week beginning 16 January 2012 and was released accordingly.)	2012	Lonely Are the Brave

== Guest appearances ==
Year	Title	Album	Artist
2010	"Afraid"	Middle Class	Jermicide & Danny Diggs
2010	"Where We Go"	Middle Class	Jermicide & Danny Diggs
2010	"Still With Me"	Middle Class	Jermicide, Danny Diggs & Johnny Roulette
2011	"Fire In Your Eyes"	No More Idols	Chase & Status
2013	"My Yout"	Summer Knights EP	Joey Badass
2014	"Coming Home"	Sirens	Gorgon City
2015	"On & On"	B4.Da.$$	Joey Badass, Dyemond Lewis
2015	"Broken Promises"	Life	Sigma
2015	"Holdin' That"	Believe & Achieve: Episode 1 - EP	Chip
2015	"Weigh Up X Positive"	Believe & Achieve: Episode 2 - EP	Chip
2016	"(I Need) Something Good"	The Night I Went To...	Rockie Fresh
2016	"Normal"	One Time	Potter Payper
2016	"Made in Love"	Thinking Out Loud	Haze
2016	"Carry Me Home"	Project 11	Jorja Smith
2016	"Blow Your Mind"	The Devil In	Devlin
2018	"Intro"	FFF Prison	K Koke
2018	"Far Away"	Facts Not Fiction	Kamakaze
2018	"Separation"	B. Inspired	Bugzy Malone
2019	"Roll Out"	La Verna	Skins Corleone
2019	"No Pain"	Toast to Our Differences	Rudimental, Kojey Radical, Kabaka Pyramid
2019	"Lost to the Streets"	Nobody Cares Till Everybody Does	Kofi Stone
2019	"Worth It"	Iona	Klashnekoff
2019	"Long Live Palestine 3"	Soundtrack to the Struggle 2	Lowkey, Frankie Boyle, Ken Loach, Chakabars, Khaled Siddiq, Mai Khalil
2020	"Get to My Dreams, Pt. 2"	Ld50, Pt. 3	Lethal Dialect
2020	"Reaction"	Dark Matter	CamelPhat, DEL-30
2021	"Anywhere But Here"	Anywhere But Here	Nyck Caution, Alex Mali
2022	"Let It Go"	Noughty by Nature	Digga D
2022	"Together"	Reason to Smile	Kojey Radical

== Music videos ==
Song	Year	Director	Reference
"Sometimes"	2009	AlphaOne	
"Jungle" (with Professor Green)	2010	Henry Scholfield	
"Look What I've Done"	2011	—N/a	
"In the Air" (with True Tiger + Professor Green) (Note: Maverick Sabre did not appear in the music video for "In the Air", though he is credited as a featured artist.)	2011	Sam Pilling	
"Let Me Go"	2011	—N/a	
"I Need"	2011	—N/a	
"No One"	2012	—N/a	
"Walk Into the Sun"	2015	—N/a	
"Come Fly Away"	2015	—N/a	

== Songwriting credits ==
List of songs written or co-written for other artists, showing year released and album name
Title	Year	Artist	Album	Notes
"Where Did I Go?"	2017	Jorja Smith	Lost & Found	Co-written with Jorja Smith
"February 3rd"	2018	Jorja Smith	Lost & Found	Co-written with Jorja Smith, Jeff Kleinman, Jason Pounds and Michael Uzowuru
"Wandering Romance"	2018	Jorja Smith	Lost & Found	Co-written with Jorja Smith and Felix Joseph
"Tomorrow"	2018	Jorja Smith	Lost & Found	Co-written with Jorja Smith and Ed Thomas
"Time"	2021	Jorja Smith	Be Right Back	Co-written with Jorja Smith and Charlie Perry
"Home"	2021	Jorja Smith	Be Right Back	Co-written with Jorja Smith and Ed Thomas
