= The Lexington, Islington =

Pub and music venue in Islington, London

The Lexington
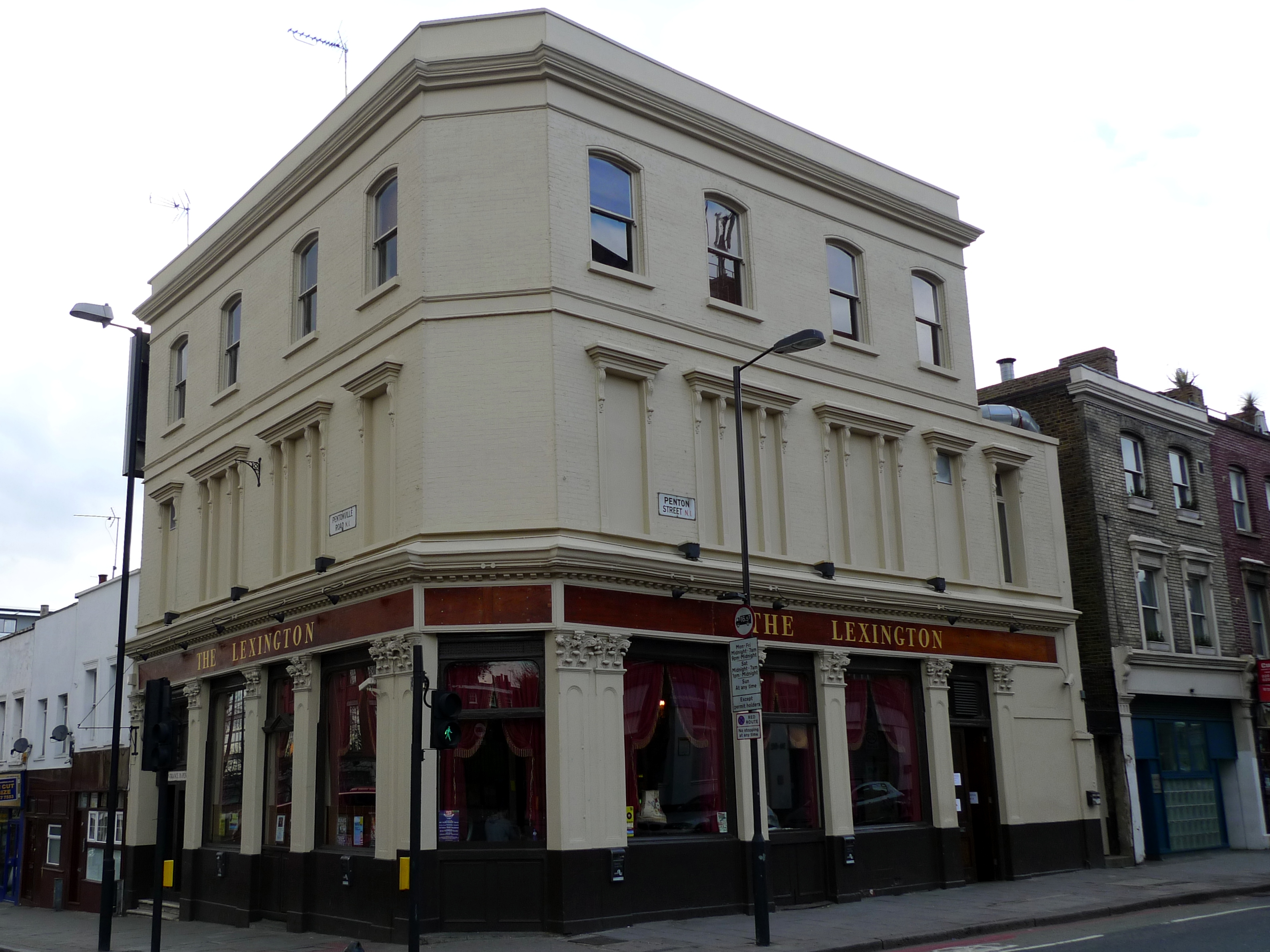
- The Lexington in 2009
- Interactive map of The Lexington
- Location: 96-98 Pentonville Rd; Islington, London, N1 9JB
- Coordinates: 51.531719°N 0.111381°W
- Capacity: 200
- Events: Indie rock, indie pop, punk rock, alternative rock

Construction
- Opened: 2008

Website
- www.thelexington.co.uk

The Lexington is a pub and music venue on Pentonville Road in Islington, London, that opened in 2008. The bar specialises in bourbon, as well as American craft beer. The building it is in was built over 1875 to 1876 and was originally known as The Belvidere Tavern.

== History ==
=== 18th and 19th centuries ===
The building now housing The Lexington was erected in 1875–1876. It was then known as The Belvidere, and was a new construction for the earlier tavern of that name on the same site, which had been there since about 1780. It was designed by the architect W. E. Williams and built by Robert Marr. Writing about the older tavern in 1882 in Notes and Queries, Edward Spencer refers to a discussion society "held there weekly, and some of our greatest ornaments of the bar and legal profession have there tested their oratorical skill" and that "in the parlour of an evening were once seen many of the authors, painters, artists, and literary men of the period."

=== 20th century ===
In the 1940s the pub, now spelled The Belvedere, was used as a venue for auctions by Henry Butcher & Co.

In the 1990s it was a tapas bar called La Finca which held salsa classes and nights upstairs.

=== 21st century ===
In the mid-2000s it was a bar called Clockwork that hosted drum and bass DJ nights, and the occasional rock gig.

The Lexington opened as a pub and music venue in 2008. The bar specialises in bourbon, as well as American craft beer. The venue area is upstairs, with a raised back section by the bar. The front of this has bench seating, but facing away from the stage.

On Monday evenings the pub has a music quiz, previously sponsored by Rough Trade, that is usually hosted by Paul Guided Missile.

The Lexington was particularly badly hit by a reform of London business rates in 2017, with a proposed increase of more than 200 percent (the average for London music venues being about 38 per cent). The venue challenged this and managed to get somewhat of a reduction to an increase of 118 percent.

The venue's existence has been threatened further by the COVID-19 pandemic. The Lexington were among the beneficiaries of the Cultural Recovery Fund administered by Arts Council England, announced on October 12, 2020. The venue stated that those funds "will go some way in mitigating the financial damage and debt accumulated over the last seven months of closure" but that they are "still in serious peril" as they were only awarded 40% of the funding they applied for. In November the Music Venue Trust announced a campaign which highlighted the 30 UK music venues deemed still in crisis, one of which is The Lexington. The venue had a crowdfunder to raise what was still needed.

The current manager is Delia Sparrow of Mambo Taxi, Ye Nuns and Phantom Pregnancies.

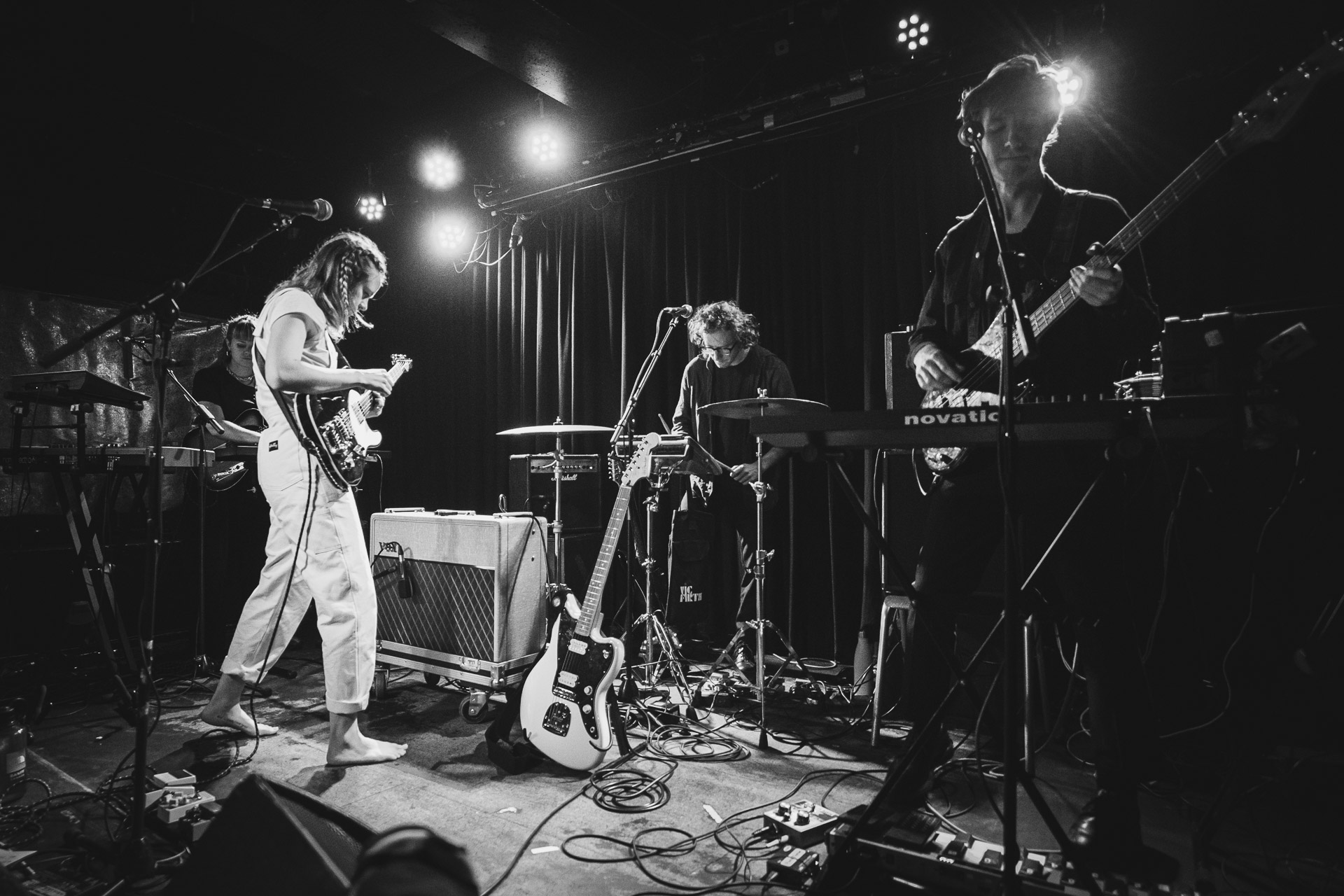
Anna B Savage and band performing at the venue in October 2021

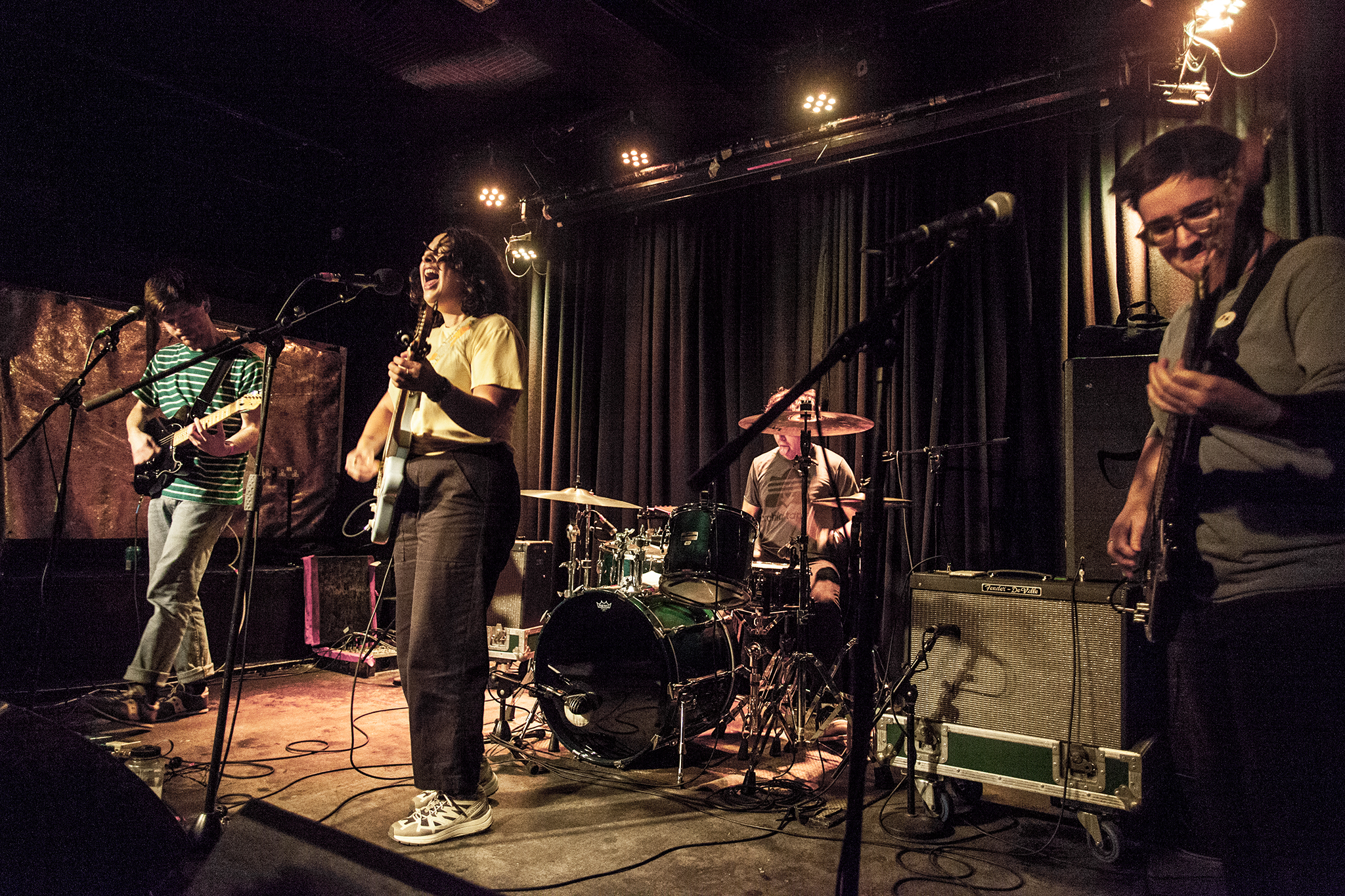
Remember Sports performing at the venue in October 2022

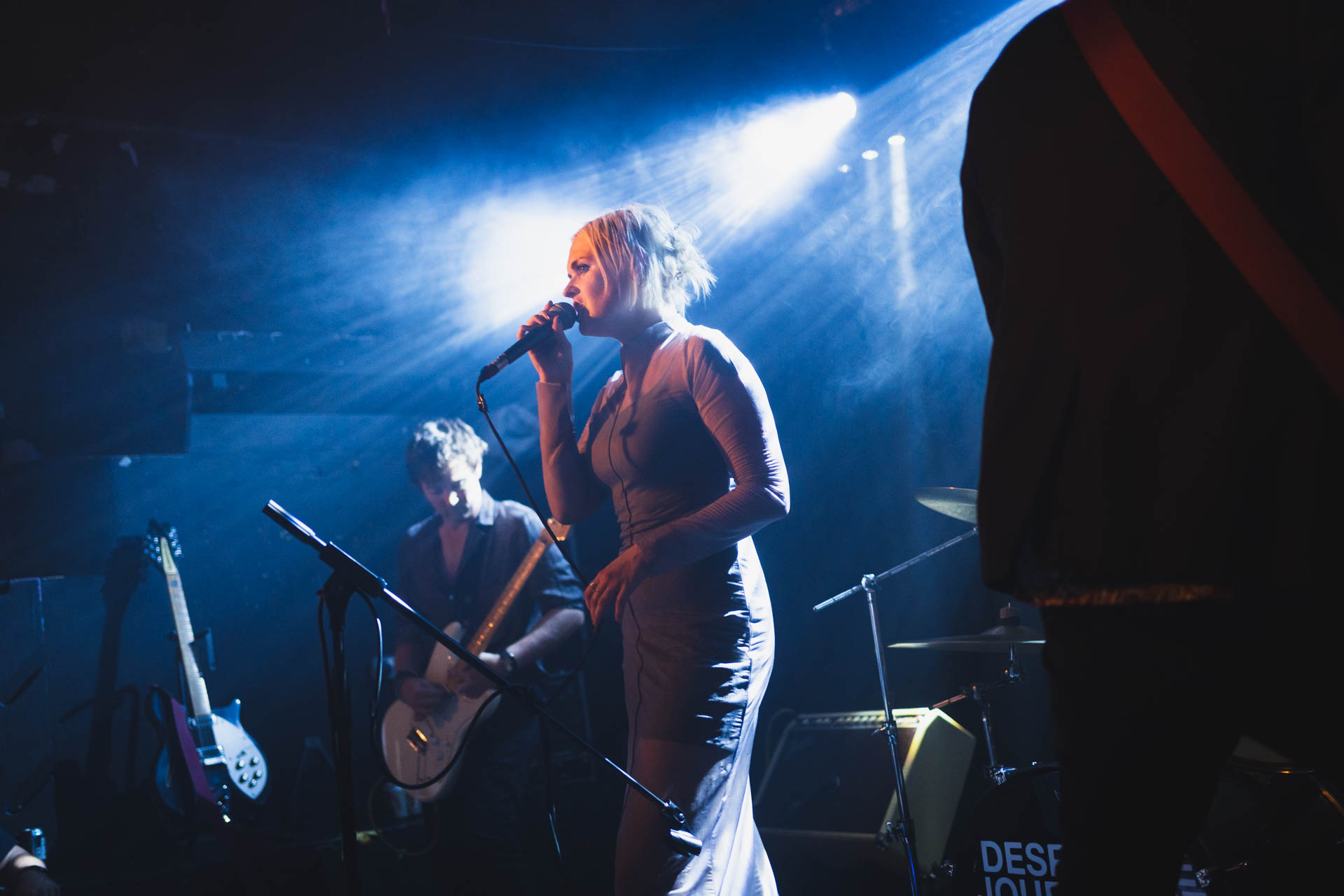
Desperate Journalist performing at the venue in October 2023

== Notable performers ==
- Alex Warren
- Amanda Bergman
- Amyl and the Sniffers
- Big Thief
- Billy Bragg
- Bis
- Black Country, New Road
- British Sea Power
- Camera Obscura
- Charlotte Church's Late Night Pop Dungeon
- Chris Corsano
- Colleen Green
- Damo Suzuki
- Goldie Boutilier
- The Darling Buds
- The Dream Syndicate
- English Teacher
- Ezra Furman
- Fat White Family
- Future of the Left
- Graham Coxon
- The Hold Steady
- Iceage
- Jay Reatard
- Jeffrey Lewis
- Joan As Policewoman
- Jodie Marie
- Kitty, Daisy & Lewis
- Laetitia Sadier
- Lambrini Girls
- Magdalena Bay
- The Monochrome Set
- Maverick Sabre
- Mumm-Ra
- Tame Impala
- The Pains of Being Pure at Heart
- The Pastels
- Panda Bear
- Pere Ubu
- Portugal the Man
- The Softies
- Speedy Ortiz
- Strawberry Guy
- Subway Sect
- Sun Ra Arkestra
- The Thermals
- Two Door Cinema Club
- Ulrika Spacek
- Vanessa Carlton
- The Vaselines
- Vic Godard
- Wet Leg
- Wunderhorse
- The Wave Pictures

== Recordings ==
- In 2011 British soul singer-songwriter Jodie Marie released an EP of songs recorded during her gig at The Lexington in 2011 titled Live At The Lexington E.P which comprised three songs from her then upcoming debut studio album "Mountain Echo": "Single Blank Canvas", "Greeney-Blue" and "Dandelion Wishes". The EP was a digital only release.
- In 2012 British-Irish soul musician Maverick Sabre released an EP of songs recorded during his gig at The Lexington in November 2011 titled Live At The Lexington which comprised three songs from his then upcoming debut studio album "Lonely Are the Brave": "I Used To Have It All", "I Need" and "Let Me Go". The EP was a digital only release.
- In 2014 British alternative rock band the House of Love released an LP of songs recorded during their gig at The Lexington in November 2013 titled Live at the Lexington 13:11:13 which comprised 14 songs: "Destroy the Heart", "Hope", "Christine", "Se Dest", "Road", "The Beatles and the Stones", "Purple Killer Rose", "Phone", "She Paints Words in Red", "Shine On", "Lost in the Blues", "A Baby Got Back on Its Feet", "I Don't Know Why I Love You" and "Touch Me".
- In 2021 British indie rock band Doe released an album of songs recorded during their final gig as a band, which was at The Lexington in 2019, titled Sincerely, Doe: Live at The Lexington. It comprised the full sixteen song set performed that night. A live video of it can be watched on YouTube.
- In 2021 Owen, the indie rock project of American musician Mike Kinsella, released an album of songs recorded at The Lexington in 2019 titled Live at The Lexington - The Complete Collection. A limited run 7-inch single of select songs was also released.
- In 2024 British and Danish rock and roll duo His Lordship released a limited run LP record of songs recorded at The Lexington in 2022 titled Live At The Lexington.
