= I Need You Tonight =

I Need You Tonight may refer to:

- "I Need You Tonight" (Professor Green song)
- "I Need You Tonight" (Junior M.A.F.I.A. song)
- "I Need You Tonight", a song by James Morrison from the album Higher Than Here
- "I Need You Tonight", a song by ZZ Top from the album Eliminator
- "I Need You Tonight", a song by Backstreet Boys from the album Millennium
