= Jungle (Professor Green song) =

Single by Professor Green featuring Maverick Sabre

from the album Alive Till I'm Dead
- B-side: "Coming To Get Me"
- Released: 3 January 2011
- Recorded: 2010
- Genre: Hip hop; grime; dubstep
- Length: 3:13
- Label: Virgin
- Songwriters: Chelsea Marie Duffield and Alexander John Gowers, Stephen Paul Manderson, Michael James Stafford
- Producer: True Tiger

Professor Green singles chronology
"Game Over" (2010)	"Jungle" (2011)	"In the Air" (2011)

Maverick Sabre singles chronology
"Sometimes" (2010)	"Jungle" (2011)	"In the Air" (2011)

"Jungle" is a song by British rapper Professor Green, released as the fourth and final single from his debut studio album, Alive Till I'm Dead. The track features vocals from Irish singer Maverick Sabre. The single was released was on 3 January 2011. The track won an award for "Best Dancefloor Filler" at the 2011 NME Awards. The music video for "Jungle" was shot in Green's hometown of Hackney, London. Green revealed that, in the video he hired locals instead of actors. The video was released on 9 November 2010.

== Remixes and covers ==
The song was officially remixed by Klashnekoff, Chelsea Marie Duffield Robert long. Wretch 32 and Malik of MD7. The remix was released on 19 January 2011 as a free download through Green's Twitter as part of his #FridayFreeness series.

== Track listing ==
Promotional CD single
No.	Title	Length
1.	"Jungle" (Radio Edit)	3:13

Digital download
No.	Title	Length
1.	"Jungle" (featuring Maverick Sabre)	3:13
2.	"Jungle" (16bit Remix)	5:12
3.	"Jungle" (High Rankin Remix)	4:17
4.	"Coming To Get Me"	3:27

12" Record Store Day vinyl
No.	Title	Length
1.	"Jungle" (featuring Maverick Sabre) (High Rankin Remix)	4:17
2.	"Monster" (featuring Example) (Totally Enormous Extinct Dinosaurs Remix)	4:33
3.	"Just Be Good to Green" (featuring Lily Allen) (Joker Remix)	4:48
4.	"Just Be Good to Green" (featuring Lily Allen) (Camo & Krooked Remix))	5:15

== Chart performance ==
"Jungle" debuted on the UK Singles Chart on 19 December 2010 at number 62. The following week, the single climbed 7 places to number 55; before falling 2 places on 2 January 2011. Upon official release the week after, "Jungle" jumped 22 places to number 33; marking Professor Green's fourth consecutive Top 40 hit, the fifth including "Game Over". The single also made a debut on the UK R&B Chart on 5 December 2010, where following a further six weeks on the chart reached a peak of number 9. On 16 January, the single climbed a further 2 places to peak at number 31.

Chart (2011)	Peak position
UK Singles (OCC)	31
UK Hip Hop/R&B (OCC)	9

== Certifications ==
Region	Certification	Certified units/sales
United Kingdom (BPI)	Gold	400,000^{‡}
^{‡} Sales+streaming figures based on certification alone.

== Release history ==
Region	Date	Format	Label
United Kingdom	3 January 2011	Digital download	Virgin Records
United Kingdom	16 April 2011	12" vinyl	Virgin Records
