= Semothy Jones =

- Birth name: Andrew Hughes
- Also known as: Sem, Prodigal Son, Soggy Face
- Origin: Islington, London, United Kingdom
- Genres: Hip hop, R&B, grime, dance-pop
- Occupation(s): Songwriter, record producer
- Years active: 2003–present
- Website: semothyjones.com

Andrew Hughes, better known as Semothy Jones or Sem for short, is an English songwriter and record producer from Islington, London.

The earliest releases from Sem were around 2005, a grime instrumental mixtape series called 'Delivery Boy'.

In 2009, Semothy was asked to help promote Timbaland's new Beaterator software in the UK.

In 2010, Semothy signed a three-year publishing deal with Major Music/BMG Publishing and became part of the Biffco/Biff Stannard songwriting/production team.

== NME Top 20 Hottest Producers 2010 ==
Semothy Jones was listed by NME as one of the 'Top 20 Hottest Producers' in October 2010. Some of the other names in the bill were Mark Ronson, Dr Luke, RedOne and Rick Rubin.

== Gain Ctrl ==
Semothy Jones is the founder of Gain Ctrl, a free youth music project that started early 2014.

== The Realness Theatre Show ==
Several tracks from the 2014 Maggie Norris directed production 'The Realness' were written by Kath Gotts and produced by Semothy Jones. The show ran over two months later 2014 and received much praise from critics and the press "The production blazes up its grimy streets powered by pure passion.” The Times

== Chart success ==
- No. 1 Album Up All Night – US Billboard 200 – Programming
- No. 2 Album Alive Till I'm Dead – UK Albums Chart – Co-writing and production
- No. 5 Single "Just Be Good To Green" – UK Singles Chart – Co-writing and production
- No. 5 Album Hands – UK Albums Chart; No. 5 European Top 100 – Production
- No. 20 Album Gloves – Australian ARIA Albums Chart – Co-writing

== Discography ==
=== Singles and album ===
==== 2007 ====
The Mitchell Brothers Dressed for the Occasion – The Beats

- "Bestest Man" – Co-production, composer

==== 2008 ====
GoldieLocks Bear Safe EP – Locked On

- "Wrapped" – Producer, composer
- "Smash & Grab" – Producer, co-writer

==== 2009 ====
Little Boots Hands – 679/Atlantic Records

- "Tune into My Heart" – Producer

==== 2010 ====
Professor Green Alive Till I'm Dead – Virgin Records

- "Just Be Good To Green" feat Lily Allen – Producer, co-writer

Operator Please Gloves – Virgin Records/Brille Records

- "Catapult" – Co-writing
- "Volcanic" – Co-writing
- "Loops" – Co-writing

==== 2011 ====
One Direction Up All Night – Syco Music

- "I Want" – Programmer,

Wretch 32 Black & White Deluxe Edition – Ministry of Sound

- "Air" feat Owen Cutts – Producer, co-writer

==== 2012 ====
Meg Myers Daughter in the Choir – Atlantic Records

- "Monster (Semothy Jones Remix)" – Producer, co-writer

=== Remixes ===
==== 2007 ====
Sosa feat Jim Jones "Promo"

- "I'm Getting Money – Semothy Jones Remix"

Plan B "No Good Promo Vinyl"

- "No Good – Prodigal Son Remix" – Producer, composer

Kate Nash "Promo"

- "Caroline – Semothy Jones Mashup"

==== 2009 ====
Little Boots New in Town Promo

- "New in Town – Semothy & Sheldrake Remix"

Lady Sovereign "So Human CD Single B Side"

- "So Human – Soggy Face Remix" – Producer, composer
- "I Got You Dancing – Semothy Jones Remix" – Producer, composer

==== 2010 ====
Operator Please Logic EP

- "Logic – Semothy Jones Remix"

=== Promo/mixtape productions ===
Plan B Paint It Blacker

- Cast A Light – Producer, co-writer
- Suzanne – Co-producer, co-writer
- Who Needs Actions When You Got Words – Producer, co-writer

Frisco Various

- Mash Up The Party ft Sway – Producer, co-writer
- Darkside – Producer, co-writer
- "The Best in the Game ft Wiley – Producer, co-Writer

Goldielocks Hardknock Compilation

- Lil' bit of Liquor – Producer, co-writer

S.A.S Various

- Shake 'n' Break ft Ransom – Producer, co-writer
