= Lonely Are the Brave (Maverick Sabre album) =

Studio album by Maverick Sabre
- Released: 27 January 2012
- Recorded: 2011
- Length: 55:02
- Label: Mercury
- Producers: Utters; Matt Prime; Jimmy Hogarth; Fraser T. Smith; Eg White; Maverick Sabre

Maverick Sabre chronology
Lonely Are the Brave (2012)	Innerstanding (2015)

Singles from Lonely Are the Brave
- 1. "Let Me Go" Released: 22 July 2011; 2. "I Need" Released: 4 November 2011; 3. "No One" Released: 5 February 2012; 4. "I Used To Have It All" Released: 30 April 2012; 5. "These Days" Released: 2 July 2012

Lonely Are the Brave is the debut studio album by English-Irish singer and rapper Maverick Sabre. The album was first released on 27 January 2012 in Ireland, which was succeeded by a release in the United Kingdom on 6 February 2012. Three singles preceded its release, "Let Me Go" (July 2011), "I Need" (November 2011) and "No One" (February 2012). Lonely Are the Brave debuted at number-two on the UK Albums Chart with first-week sales of 44,292 copies, also peaking at number two on the Scottish Albums Chart and number three on the Irish Albums Chart.

== Background ==
Speaking in December 2011, Sabre explained his reasons for titling the album 'Lonely Are The Brave': "'Lonely Are The Brave' was actually the title of an old movie that I first heard about when I was really young - around 12 or 13 - and I actually thought the feeling captured in that one phrase was amazing, because I feel everybody at some point in their lives needs to be brave to get through loneliness. And, because I thought it also summed up a lotta the emotion behind this album - particularly in terms of where I was at when I was writing a lotta the songs - I just felt as a title it fitted the project really well."

== Critical reception ==
Digital Spy gave the album 4 stars out of 5 stars - "But while his voice may sound part-Amy Winehouse, part-Daniel Merriweather, few could accuse him of leaning on others [...] his first collection of self-penned tracks is both brutally opinionated and unnervingly honest."

== Singles ==
"Let Me Go" was first released in the United Kingdom on 22 July 2011 as the lead single from Lonely Are the Brave. It debuted at number sixteen on the UK chart, marking Sabre's second top forty single after "Jungle"; which peaked at number thirty-one. The song also peaked at number thirty-eight on the Irish chart and number twenty-seven on the Scottish chart. The track was succeeded by "I Need", first released as the second single from Lonely Are the Brave on 4 November 2011. "I Need" debuted at number eighteen on the UK chart, Sabre's second consecutive release to achieve this feat, also peaking at number thirty-two on the Irish chart and number twenty-four on the Scottish chart - higher than the peak of the previous release. A third single, "No One", was released in the UK on 5 February 2012 to coincide with the album release. The single failed to chart in Ireland and Scotland, despite debuting at number fifty on the UK chart. A fourth single, "I Used To Have It All", was released in the UK on 30 April 2012. The fifth single "These Days" was released on 2 July 2012.

== Track listing ==
Lonely Are the Brave track listing
No.	Title	Writer(s)	Producer	Length
1.	"I Need"	Michael Stafford, Dan Radclyffe & Craig Merrin	Utters	4:00
2.	"Let Me Go"	Matt Prime, Michael Stafford & Isaac Hayes	Matt Prime	3:31
3.	"Open My Eyes"	Michael Stafford & Dan Radclyffe	Utters	4:06
4.	"Memories"	Michael Stafford, Leonard Hubbard, Jimmy Gray, Raphael Soadig, Tariq Trotter, Ahmir Thompson, Vic Brown & Tarik L Collins	Maverick Sabre	3:37
5.	"Cold Game"	Michael Stafford & Jimmy Hogarth	Jimmy Hogarth	3:43
6.	"No One"	Michael Stafford & Fraser T. Smith	Fraser T Smith	3:34
7.	"These Days"	Michael Stafford, Matt Prime, Gene Clark & James Mcguinn	Matt Prime	3:40
8.	"Sometimes"	Michael Stafford	Maverick Sabre, Utters	3:47
9.	"I Used to Have It All"	Michael Stafford & Francis Anthony "Eg" White	Eg White, Utters	3:51
10.	"Shootin' the Stars"	Michael Stafford & Jimmy Hogarth	Jimmy Hogarth	3:36
11.	"I Can Never Be"	Michael Stafford & Dan Radclyffe	Utters	4:59
12.	"Running Away"	Michael Stafford & Fraser T Smith	Fraser T Smith	3:33
13.	"A Change is Gonna Come" (Acoustic Version)	Sam Cooke		3:14
14.	"I Don't See the Sun (Don't Ever Feel Too Much)" / "They've Found Him a Gun" (live at the Jazz Café; hidden track)	Michael Stafford & Jimmy Hogarth		8:31

HMV Exclusive Bonus Disc
No.	Title	Length
1.	"Look What I've Done"	3:55
2.	"I Can Never Be"	4:58
3.	"Run to the Roof"	3:31
4.	"Round Here"	3:40

Deluxe edition
No.	Title	Length
1.	"Video Games" / "Heaven"
2.	"Beautiful Girls" / "Stand by Me"
3.	"Georgia on My Mind"
4.	"Fairytale of New York"
5.	"Wonderwall"
6.	"Let Me Go" (Shy FX Remix)
7.	"I Need" (Zed Bias Remix)
8.	"No One" (TC Remix)
9.	"I Used to Have It All" (Delta Heavy Remix)
10.	"These Days" (Friction Remix)
11.	"Run to the Roof" (MistaJam's Live Lounge)
12.	"They Found Him a Gun" (Ras Kwame's Live Lounge)
13.	"No One" (Fearne Cotton's Live Lounge)
14.	"I Used to Have It All" (Dermot O'Leary's Live Lounge)
15.	"These Days" (Live @ Hackney Academy)

== Charts ==
=== Weekly charts ===
Weekly chart performance for Lonely Are the Brave
Chart (2012)	Peak position
Irish Albums (IRMA)	3
Scottish Albums (Official Charts)	2
UK Albums (Official Charts)	2

=== Year-end charts ===
Year-end chart performance for Lonely Are the Brave
Chart (2012)	Position
UK Albums (OCC)	45

== Release history ==
Release history and formats for Lonely Are the Brave
Country	Release date	Format(s)
Ireland	27 January 2012	Digital download
United Kingdom	6 February 2012	Digital download
United Kingdom	6 February 2012	CD
