= In the Air (True Tiger song) =

Single by True Tiger featuring Professor Green and Maverick Sabre
- Released: 12 June 2011
- Recorded: 2011
- Genre: Dance
- Length: 3:13
- Label: Virgin
- Songwriter(s): Stephen Manderson; Maverick Sabre; Sukh Knight; Gowers; Blue Bear; Stanza; Chunky
- Producer(s): True Tiger

True Tiger singles chronology
"Slang Like This" (2010)	"In the Air" (2011)

Professor Green singles chronology
"Jungle" (2011)	"In the Air" (2011)	"Read All About It" (2011)

Maverick Sabre singles chronology
"Jungle" (2011)	"In the Air" (2011)	"Let Me Go" (2011)

"In the Air" is a song by producer and DJ group True Tiger, featuring British singer Maverick Sabre and British rapper Professor Green. The track was released on 12 June 2011 as a digital download in the United Kingdom. A music video to accompany the release of "In the Air" was first released onto YouTube on 19 May 2011; at a total length of three minutes and twenty-five seconds.

== Track listing ==
Digital download
No.	Title	Length
1.	"In the Air" (Original Mix)	3:05
2.	"In the Air" (Dub Mix)	3:01
3.	"In the Air" (S.P.Y Remix)	5:40
4.	"In the Air" (True Tiger 'Mosh Pit' Remix)	4:00
5.	"In the Air" (Instrumental)	3:01

== Chart performance ==
Chart (2011)	Peak position
UK Dance (OCC)	15
UK Singles (OCC)	52

== Release history ==
Region	Date	Format	Label
United Kingdom	12 June 2011	Digital download	Virgin Records
