= Alive Till I'm Dead =

Studio album by Professor Green
- Released: 16 July 2010
- Recorded: 2010
- Genre: British hip hop, grime, UK garage
- Length: 42:52
- Label: Virgin
- Producer: Future Cut, Alex 'Cores' Hayes, Mike Skinner, The ThundaCatz, Labrinth, Naughty Boy, True Tiger, Semothy Jones

Professor Green chronology
The Green EP (2008)	Alive Till I'm Dead (2010)	At Your Inconvenience (2011)

Singles from Alive Till I'm Dead
- 1. "I Need You Tonight" Released: 9 April 2010; 2. "Just Be Good to Green" Released: 25 June 2010; 3. "Monster" Released: 1 October 2010; 4. "Jungle" Released: 31 December 2010

Alive Till I'm Dead is the first studio album by the English rapper Professor Green, released on 16 July 2010. The album includes guest vocals by Lily Allen, Example, Labrinth and Emeli Sandé, among others.

== Background ==
"Just Be Good to Green" was originally written and produced back in July 2007 when Green was signed to Mike Skinner's record label, The Beats. It was composed and produced by Semothy Jones, and at the time featured Neon Hitch on the chorus. When The Beats closed down, the track was put on hold, and later purchased by Green for use on his next record. Green spoke about how the collaboration came about between him and Lily Allen, saying that they began speaking through Facebook.

Green said, "We got chatting on Facebook and I mentioned the track, which turned out to be one of her favourite songs. She suggested her singing the chorus. I didn't take much persuading! Lily's wicked. She's straightforward and honest, you always know where you're at with her."

== Singles ==
- "I Need You Tonight" was released in the United Kingdom and Ireland as the first single from Alive Till I'm Dead. The song features guest vocals from Ed Drewett. It was written by Professor Green, produced by The ThundaCatz, mixed by Steve Fitzmaurice. The single debuted at number 3 in the UK Singles Chart and also did well in Ireland, where it charted at number 15. "I Need You Tonight" samples the 1987 rock/new wave song "Need You Tonight" by INXS.
- "Just Be Good to Green" is the second single from the album. It features guest vocals from Allen and was officially released on 25 June 2010. It has been released around the world. The song charted at number 52 in Australia. "Just Be Good to Green" samples the 1983 R&B song "Just Be Good to Me" by The SOS Band.
- "Monster" is the third single from album. It features vocals from Example and was released on 1 October 2010. Video shooting started on 8 September. The video was released on 17 September 2010.
- "Jungle" is the fourth single from the album. It features guest vocals from Maverick Sabre and was released on 20 December. It peaked at 31 on the UK Singles Chart and 9 on the UK R&B Chart.

== Commercial performance ==
The album debuted at No. 2 on the UK Albums Chart. The album is now platinum, selling 400,000 copies in UK.

== Reception ==
Professional ratings
Review scores
Source	Rating
AllMusic	4/5 stars
Daily Mirror	4/5 stars
The Guardian	4/5 stars
The Independent	3/5 stars
Metro	4/5 stars
MusicOMH	4/5 stars
RapReviews	(6.5/10)
The Skinny	1/5 stars

Alive Till I'm Dead received positive reviews from music critics, with BBC Music describing the album as "fizzy, dramatic and inventive as pop should be without losing his initial grime edge". Paul MacInnes of The Guardian gave a similar review, agreeging that it was "Pop music, yes, but sparky and cleverly composed pop that still has an ear for the club". He also remarked that Professor Green has a "flow like an estuary Eminem and a humorous sensibility reminiscent of Lily Allen".

Helen Clarke of MusicOMH also praised the album, also comparing Professor Green with Eminem, saying that "Alive Till I'm Dead grabs you like the first few times you heard The Slim Shady LP". She also wrote that the album was a "ball of tightly wound bitterness, anger and aggression", while also managing to be "cheeky, playful and almost frighteningly confident and experimental". Jesal Padania of RapReviews gave a positive review, tempered with a feeling that Professor Green is "so much more" than what his record label have allowed him to display thus far.

== Track listing ==
Standard edition
No.	Title	Writer(s)	Producer(s)	Length
1.	"Kids That Love to Dance" (featuring Emeli Sandé)	Stephen Manderson, Emeli Sandé, Shahid Khan, Harry Craze, Hugo Chegwin	Naughty Boy	2:46
2.	"Just Be Good to Green" (featuring Lily Allen)	Manderson, Terry Lewis, Andrew Hughes, Samuel Harris	Semothy Jones	3:26
3.	"I Need You Tonight" (featuring Ed Drewett)	Manderson, Andrew Farriss, Michael Hutchence, Moore, El Bergamy	The ThundaCatz	3:45
4.	"City of Gold"	Manderson, Lee Bailey, James Murray, Mustafa Omar	Mojam	4:02
5.	"Oh My God" (featuring Labrinth)	Manderson, Timothy McKenzie, Marc Williams	Labrinth, Da Digglar	3:51
6.	"Jungle" (featuring Maverick Sabre)	Manderson, Maverick Sabre, Sukh Knight, John Gowers, Blue Bear, Stanza, Chunky	True Tiger	3:13
7.	"Do for You"	Manderson, Hanni Ibrahim (Orchestral arrangement by Jules Buckley)	Sunny Productions	4:21
8.	"Falling Down"	Manderson, Bailey, DeLeon Blake, Yogi Tulsiani, Costas Nicolaides	Yogi Tulsiani	3:53
9.	"Monster" (featuring Example)	Manderson, Elliot Gleave, James Murray, Mustafa Omar	Future Cut, Mojam	3:08
10.	"Closing the Door" (featuring Fink)	Manderson, Fink Greenall	Fink	4:00
11.	"Where Do We Go" (featuring Shereen Shabanaa)	Manderson, Alex 'Cores' Hayes	Alex 'Cores' Hayes, 12 Milagram	3:47
12.	"Goodnight"	Manderson, Alex 'Cores' Hayes, Edward Hayes (Orchestral arrangement by Jules Buckley)	Alex 'Cores' Hayes	4:43

iTunes Store deluxe edition bonus tracks
No.	Title	Writer(s)	Producer(s)	Length
13.	"Crying Game" (featuring The Streets)	Manderson, Mike Skinner, Kevin Mark Trail, Johnny Drum Machine	Mike Skinner	3:55
14.	"All to Myself" (pre-order only)	Manderson, Hayes	Alex 'Cores' Hayes	4:25

== Charts ==
=== Weekly charts ===
Chart (2010)	Peak position
Australian Albums (ARIA)	98
Irish Albums (IRMA)	18
Scottish Albums (Official Charts)	5
UK Albums (Official Charts)	2

=== Year-end charts ===
Chart (2010)	Position
UK Albums (OCC)	101
Chart (2011)	Position
UK Albums (OCC)	143

== Certifications ==
Region	Certification	Certified units/sales
United Kingdom (BPI)	Platinum	300,000^{‡}
^{‡} Sales+streaming figures based on certification alone.
