= Let Me Go (Maverick Sabre song) =

Single by Maverick Sabre

from the album Lonely Are the Brave
- Released: 22 July 2011
- Recorded: 2011
- Genre: R&B, hip hop, soul
- Length: 3:31
- Label: Mercury
- Songwriter(s): Isaac Hayes, Matt Prime, Michael Stafford
- Producer(s): Matt Prime

Maverick Sabre singles chronology
"In the Air" (2011)	"Let Me Go" (2011)	"I Need" (2011)

"Let Me Go" is the debut single by English-Irish singer Maverick Sabre, from his debut studio album Lonely Are the Brave. It was released on 22 July 2011 as a digital download in the United Kingdom. The song was shortlisted for the Meteor Choice Music Prize for Irish Song of the Year 2011.

== Background ==
The single was released on 24 July 2011 as a digital download in the United Kingdom. The song was first played on BBC Radio 1Xtra on 30 May 2011 at 7pm. It contains a sample of Isaac Hayes's song Ike's Rap II, and contains a female vocal refrain reminiscent of the chorus of "Glory Box" by Portishead, which samples the same song. The song also contains a sample of the song "Hammerhead" by Simon Haseley, released in 1972 through De Wolfe Music, which had been previously sampled by Beyoncé in "A Woman Like Me".

== Music video ==
A music video to accompany the release of "Let Me Go" was first released onto YouTube on 10 June 2011 and was set in Las Vegas; at a total length of three minutes and thirty-seven seconds.

== Chart performance ==
On the week ending 6 August 2011 "Let Me Go" debuted at number sixteen on the UK Singles Chart – marking Sabre's second top forty single after "Jungle" reached number thirty-one in January, earlier that year. The song spent three consecutive weeks within the top forty, falling to number forty-three for the week ending 27 August. Following the release of Lonely Are the Brave, "Let Me Go" re-entered the chart on 19 February 2012 at number thirty-nine – marking its fourth non-consecutive week within the top forty.

== Track listing ==
Digital download
No.	Title	Length
1.	"Let Me Go"	3:31
2.	"Let Me Go" (Shy FX & Benny Page Digital Soundboy Remix)	4:58
3.	"Let Me Go" (True Tiger Remix)	4:12
4.	"Let Me Go" (Roksonix Remix)	4:36
5.	"Let Me Go" (Mike Delinquent Remix)	5:27

== Charts ==
Chart (2011)	Peak position
Belgium (Ultratip Bubbling Under Flanders)	34
Ireland (IRMA)	38
Scotland (OCC)	27
UK Singles (OCC)	16

== Release history ==
Region	Date	Format	Label
United Kingdom	22 July 2011	Digital download	Mercury Records

== Other versions ==
British singer/songwriter Katy B covered "Let Me Go" as part of a set for BBC Radio 1's Live Lounge on 20 August 2011, alongside own tracks "Broken Record" and "Witches' Brew". The song then appeared on the sixth compilation of the Live Lounge.
