= No One (Maverick Sabre song) =

Single by Maverick Sabre

from the album Lonely Are the Brave
- Released: 3 February 2012
- Recorded: 2011
- Genre: R&B; soul
- Length: 3:34
- Label: Mercury
- Songwriter(s): Michael Stafford, Fraser T Smith
- Producer(s): Fraser T Smith

Maverick Sabre singles chronology
"I Need" (2011)	"No One" (2012)	"I Used to Have It All" (2012)

"No One" is a song by British singer Maverick Sabre, from his debut studio album Lonely Are the Brave. It was released as a digital download in the United Kingdom on 3 February 2012. The song entered the UK Singles Chart at number 50.

== Music video ==
A music video to accompany the release of "No One" was first released onto YouTube on 23 January 2012 at a total length of three minutes and thirty-four seconds.

== Track listing ==
Digital download
No.	Title	Length
1.	"No One"	3:34
2.	"No One" (Roska Remix)	4:02
3.	"No One" (Stinkahbell Remix)	3:31
4.	"No One" (TC Remix)	6:04
5.	"No One" (New Machine Remix)	3:40
6.	"No One" (Wideboys Remix)	8:05

== Chart performance ==
Chart (2012)	Peak position
UK Singles (OCC)	50

== Release history ==
Region	Date	Format	Label
United Kingdom	February 3, 2012	Digital download	Mercury Records
