= Just Be Good to Green =

2010 single by Professor Green

Single by Professor Green featuring Lily Allen

from the album Alive Till I'm Dead
- Released: 25 June 2010
- Recorded: 2009
- Genre: Electro-hop; pop
- Length: 3:14 (clean version); 3:24 (explicit version)
- Label: Virgin
- Songwriters: Stephen Manderson; Andrew Hughes; Jimmy Jam & Terry Lewis
- Producers: Semothy Jones; Future Cut

Professor Green singles chronology
"I Need You Tonight" (2010)	"Just Be Good to Green" (2010)	"Monster" (2010)

Lily Allen singles chronology
"Who'd Have Known" (2009)	"Just Be Good to Green" (2010)	"5 O'Clock" (2011)

Music video
- "Professor Green Feat. Lily Allen - Just Be Good To Green" on YouTube

"Just Be Good to Green" is a reworked cover of "Dub Be Good to Me" by British recording artist Professor Green from his debut studio album, Alive Till I'm Dead. Featuring pop singer Lily Allen, the song was released as the second single by Virgin Records in Australia on 25 June 2010, and in the UK on 11 July 2010.

== Background and composition ==
The track was originally made back in 2007 when Professor Green was signed to The Beats. The song was composed and produced by Semothy Jones and, at the time, featured Neon Hitch on the chorus. Though when The Beats folded the track was put on hold.

In 2009, Professor Green stated that the collaboration between him and Allen started after a conversation on Facebook:

"We got chatting on Facebook and I mentioned the track, which turned out to be one of her favourite songs. She suggested her singing the chorus. I didn't take much persuading! Lily's wicked. She's straightforward and honest, you always know where you're at with her."

As in song "Dub Be Good to Me", the vocal melody comes from the original song by The SOS Band, "Just Be Good to Me" (from the album On the Rise, 1983, Tabu Records). The bass line originally comes from the famous song by The Clash "The Guns of Brixton". The vocal part of "Just Be Good To Green" has been since covered many times in different house tracks, such as Kandy Wesley (Airplay Records, 1999) and Dr Kucho! (Spinnin' Record, 2009).

== Critical reception ==
Robert Copsey of Digital Spy gave the song three out of five stars, stating "[Green's] rhymes aren't as ear-snagging as they were last time out, but Allen certainly does justice to that melody".

== Music video ==
Allen and Green on the conveyor belt, in the music video for "Just Be Good to Green".

The music video premiered on 21 May 2010 on Professor Green's official YouTube account.

== Live performances ==
On Allen's tour, Green used to join her on stage to perform the song together. Green also performed it live on Big Brother. On 23 June 2010, Camden Venue Proud Gallery celebrated its second birthday with Professor Green performing on the night. Though as he went through his set, Amy Winehouse unexpectedly joined him live on stage to sing Allen's part on "Just Be Good to Green". The track was also supposed to be promoted on Scott Mills' Radio 1 Show and Alan Carr: Chatty Man, but Allen cancelled due to illness. Alan Carr responded by calling the singer "a fucking bitch" for pulling out two hours before the filming of the show, but it was unclear as to whether his comments were sarcastic or not.

== Track listings and formats ==
Digital download
No.	Title	Length
1.	"Just Be Good to Green" (Radio Edit)	3:14
2.	"Just Be Good to Green" (Explicit)	3:23
3.	"Just Be Good to Green" (Camo & Krooked remix)	5:17
4.	"Just Be Good to Green" (Greenmoney's Colour Blind Remix)	6:19
5.	"Just Be Good to Green" (Instrumental)	3:23
6.	"Just Be Good to Green" (Video)	3:25

UK CD single
No.	Title	Length
1.	"Just Be Good to Green"	3:24
2.	"Just Be Good to Green" (Camo & Krooked remix)	5:17

== Charts and certifications ==
=== Weekly charts ===
Chart (2010)	Peak position
Australia (ARIA)	49
Europe (European Hot 100 Singles)	20
Germany (Deutsche Black Charts)	23
Hungary (Editors' Choice Top 40)	37
Ireland (IRMA)	17
Netherlands (Single Top 100)	95
New Zealand (Recorded Music NZ)	32
UK Singles (Official Charts)	5

=== Certifications ===
Region	Certification	Certified units/sales
United Kingdom (BPI)	Gold	400,000
