= I Need You Tonight (Professor Green song) =

2010 single by Professor Green

Single by Professor Green featuring Ed Drewett

from the album Alive Till I'm Dead
- B-side: "Hard Night Out"
- Released: 9 April 2010
- Recorded: 2009
- Genre: Hip hop
- Length: 3:45
- Label: Virgin
- Songwriter(s): Manderson, Moore, El Bergamy, A. Farriss, M. Hutchence
- Producer(s): The ThundaCatz

Professor Green singles chronology
"Before I Die" (2006)	"I Need You Tonight" (2010)	"Just Be Good to Green" (2010)

Ed Drewett singles chronology
"I Need You Tonight" (2010)	"Champagne Lemonade" (2010)

"I Need You Tonight" is a song by British rapper and singer Professor Green, featuring vocals from British singer-songwriter Ed Drewett and produced by The ThundaCatz. The song samples "Need You Tonight", originally written and performed by Australian rock band INXS. The song was released as the lead single from his debut album Alive Till I'm Dead on 9 April 2010 as a digital download and was released physically as a CD single the following day. It reached number 3 on the UK Singles Chart.

== Chart performance ==
Having been predicted to debut on the UK Singles Chart at number 1, the single debuted at number 3 on 18 April 2010 behind Scouting for Girls and Usher with "This Ain't a Love Song" and "OMG", respectively. The following week the single fell 3 places to number 6, where it remained for two consecutive weeks. On 9 May 2010, the single fell a further 3 places to number 9, the single spent 4 weeks within the Top 10.

On 15 April 2010, "I Need You Tonight" debuted on the Irish Singles Chart at a number 24, marking Professor Green's only single to make an impact on the chart. The following week the single rose to number 21 and on its third week in the chart, it rose to its peak of number 15.

== Music video ==
The music video for "I Need You Tonight" was shot at a pub in Hackney, London. It features Professor Green being taken as an idiot by a girl (played by model Carly Baker) who he desperately tries to get the attention of. Ed Drewett also appears in the video.

== Live performances ==
Professor Green has performed this song live feat Ed Drewett, with appearances seen at Live from Studio Five, GMTV, T4 on the Beach and on Professor Green's Tour. Following Drewett's departure from live events, Professor Green has been singing "I Need You Tonight" live on tour and on TV without him. An acoustic version of this song was performed by Green and his backing singers for The Sun.

== Track listing ==
Digital download
No.	Title	Length
1.	"I Need You Tonight"	3:45
2.	"I Need You Tonight" (Doman & Gooding Remix)	4:20
3.	"I Need You Tonight" (Gramophonedzie Remix)	6:50
4.	"I Need You Tonight" (Instrumental)	3:44
5.	"Hard Night Out"	3:16
6.	"I Need You Tonight" (Video)	3:34

CD single
No.	Title	Length
1.	"I Need You Tonight"	3:45
2.	"I Need You Tonight" (Doman & Gooding Remix)	4:20

== Credits and personnel ==
- Writer - Manderson, Moore, El Bergamy, A. Farriss, M. Hutchence
- Producer - The ThundaCatz
- Mixer - Steve Fitzmaurice

== Charts and certifications ==
=== Weekly charts ===
Chart (2010)	Peak position
Czech Republic (Rádio – Top 100)	18
Ireland (IRMA)	15
UK Singles (OCC)	3

=== Certifications ===
Region	Certification	Certified units/sales
United Kingdom (BPI)	Gold	400,000^{‡}
^{‡} Sales+streaming figures based on certification alone.
