= Innerstanding (Maverick Sabre album) =

Studio album by Maverick Sabre
- Released: 30 October 2015
- Length: 67:34
- Label: Mercury
- Producer: Dan Radcliffe; Fraser T. Smith; Utters; Craze & Hoax; Jimmy Hogarth; Eg White; Chris Loco

Maverick Sabre chronology
Lonely Are the Brave (2012)	Innerstanding (2015)	When I Wake Up (2019)

Singles from Innerstanding
- 1. "Walk Into The Sun" Released: 28 June 2015; 2. "Come Fly Away" Released: 23 October 2015

Professional ratings
Review scores
Source	Rating
Contactmusic.com	2.5/5 stars
The Independent	2/5 stars

Innerstanding is the second studio album by English-Irish singer Maverick Sabre. The album was released on 30 October 2015 via Mercury Records Two singles preceded its release, "Walk Into the Sun" (28 June 2015) and "Come Fly Away" (23 October 2015). The album debuted at No. 41 on the UK Albums Chart and No. 73 on the Irish Albums Chart.

== Track listing ==
Innerstanding track listing
No.	Title	Writer(s)	Producer(s)	Length
1.	"Hold On"	Michael Stafford, Dan Radclyffe	Dan Radcliffe	4:08
2.	"Come Fly Away"	Michael Stafford, Fraser T. Smith	Fraser T. Smith & Utters	3:33
3.	"Breathe"	Michael Stafford, Jimmy Hogarth, Dan Radclyffe	Jimmy Hogarth & Utters	3:50
4.	"Give It Up"	Michael Stafford, Anup Paul, Hugo Chegwin, Harry Craze	Craze & Hoax	3:14
5.	"Why" (featuring Chronixx)	Michael Stafford, Eg White, Jamar Rolando McNaughton Jr	Utters & Eg White	4:18
6.	"Don't Forget"	Michael Stafford, Dan Radclyffe	Dan Radclyffe	3:48
7.	"So Free"	Michael Stafford, Anup Paul, Hugo Chegwin, Harry Craze, Steve Lukather	Craze & Hoax	3:04
8.	"Mother"	Michael Stafford, Anup Paul, Hugo Chegwin, Harry Craze	Craze & Hoax	3:47
9.	"Walk Into The Sun"	Michael Stafford, Ed Thomas, Toby Davis	Seemore	3:10
10.	"Falling Again"	Michael Stafford, Ed Thomas, Toby Davis	Seemore & Utters	3:26
11.	"We Don't Wanna Be" (featuring Joey Bada$$)	Michael Stafford, Adam Jordan, Jo-Vaughn Virginie	New Machine	5:25
12.	"Give Me Love"	Michael Stafford, Chris Loco	Chris Loco	2:45
13.	"Lay Your Head"	Michael Stafford, Jimmy Hogarth	Jimmy Hogarth	4:02
14.	"Half Empty"	Michael Stafford, Zane Lowe	Zane Lowe	4:08
15.	"Rolling With Me (I Got Love)" (Soul Circuit featuring Maverick Sabre)	Daniel Timcke, Thomas Moore, Ray Charles, Nathaniel D Hale, Michael Stafford, Roosevelt Harell	Soul Circuit	4:01
16.	"Hard On Me" (Gorgon City featuring Maverick Sabre)	Matthew Robson-Scott, Kye Gibbon, Michael Stafford, Jonny Coffer	Matthew Robson-Scott, Kye Gibbon & Jonny Coffer	4:37
17.	"You Give Me Love" (Idris Elba featuring Maverick Sabre)	Idris Elba, Mr Hudson, Michael Stafford	Mr Hudson	3:53
18.	"Home" (Idris Elba featuring Maverick Sabre)	Marcus Mumford, Edward Dwane, Benjamin Lovett	Idris Elba & Mr Hudson	5:05

== Charts ==
Chart performance for Innerstanding
Chart (2015)	Peak position
Irish Albums (IRMA)	73
UK Albums (OCC)	41
