= When I Wake Up =

Studio album by Maverick Sabre
- Released: 22 March 2019
- Genre: R&B; soul
- Length: 54:25
- Label: FAMM

Maverick Sabre chronology
Innerstanding (2015)	When I Wake Up (2019)	Don't Forget to Look Up (2022)

Singles from When I Wake Up
- 1. "Drifting" Released: 7 September 2018; 2. "Her Grace" Released: 4 December 2018; 3. "Glory" Released: 2019

When I Wake Up is the third studio album by English/Irish singer Maverick Sabre. His "most personal record" to date, the album was released on 22 March 2019 on Sabre's own imprint FAMM.

== Critical reception ==
Professional ratings
Review scores
Source	Rating
The Irish Times	4/5 stars
PopMatters	9/10

The album has received generally positive reviews from music critics, including ABC News and London in Stereo. M. Oliver of PopMatters claimed it to be the best album by Sabre to date.

== Track listing ==
When I Wake Up track listing
No.	Title	Writer(s)	Producer(s)	Length
1.	"Preach"	Michael Stafford, Charlie Perry	Charlie Perry	4:46
2.	"Drifting"	Michael Stafford	Michael Stafford	3:53
3.	"Into Nirvana"	Michael Stafford, Jimmy Hogarth, Dan Radclyffe	Jimmy Hogarth & Utters	4:02
4.	"Guns in the Distance"	Michael Stafford, Jimmy Hogarth	Jimmy Hogarth	4:06
5.	"Don't Talk About It"	Michael Stafford, Kirsty Parsons, Ian Curtis	Michael Stafford	3:17
6.	"Slow Down" (featuring Jorja Smith)	Michael Stafford, Jorja Smith, Charlie Perry	Charlie Perry	3:31
7.	"Her Grace" (featuring Chronixx)	Michael Stafford, Charlie Perry, Jamar McNaughton	Michael Stafford & Charlie Perry	3:31
8.	"Weakness"	Michael Stafford, Dan Radclyffe, Ed Thomas	Utters	3:36
9.	"A Mile Away"	Michael Stafford	Michael Stafford	2:53
10.	"Big Smoke"	Michael Stafford,	Charlie Perry & Michael Stafford	6:16
11.	"Into Hope"	Michael Stafford, Eg White	Eg White	3:35
12.	"War"	Michael Stafford	Michael Stafford & Charlie Perry	5:03
13.	"Glory"	Michael Stafford, Adam Jordan	Adam Jordan (New Machine)	5:56

== Charts ==
Chart performance for When I Wake Up
Chart (2019)	Peak position
Irish Albums (IRMA)	35
Scottish Albums (OCC)	62
UK Albums (OCC)	46
