= Don't Forget to Look Up =

Studio album by Maverick Sabre
- Released: 28 January 2022
- Genre: R&B
- Length: 39:06
- Label: FAMM

Maverick Sabre chronology
When I Wake Up (2019)	Don't Forget to Look Up (2022)	Burn the Right Things Down (2024)

Singles from Don't Forget to Look Up
- 1. "Not Easy Love" Released: 24 September 2021; 2. "Walk These Days" Released: 29 October 2021; 3. "Good Man" Released: 28 January 2022

Don't Forget to Look Up is the fourth studio album by English/Irish singer Maverick Sabre, released on 28 January 2022 on Sabre's own imprint FAMM.

== Critical reception ==
Professional ratings
Review scores
Source	Rating
The Arts Desk	3/5 stars
The Irish Times	3/5 stars

Eamon Sweeney of The Irish Times said that "Don't Forget to Look Up is for the most part very good, though sometimes it strays down some rather dull dead-ends." Joe Muggs of The Arts Desk stated that on Don't Forget to Look Up Sabre is "in great and distinctive form" but that "the one thing that's missing is killer hooks ... Ultimately this album feels steady-as-she-goes, an artist who's always gone his own way cementing his position, but it also feels full of promise of a really major statement yet to come."

== Track listing ==
Track listing for Don't Forget to Look Up
No.	Title	Writer(s)	Producer(s)	Length
1.	"Falling"	Michael Stafford; Linden Jay Berelowitz	Linden Jay Berelowitz	3:26
2.	"Not Easy Love" (featuring Demae)	Michael Stafford; Demae Wodu; Ben McKone	Michael Stafford	2:58
3.	"Get By"	Michael Stafford; Linden Jay Berelowitz; Lydia Kitto	Linden Jay Berelowitz	4:06
4.	"Good Man"	Michael Stafford; Linden Jay Berelowitz; Alvin Paige; Benjamin Aaron Crawford; Calvin Billups; Leo Davis; Renon Sumpter	Linden Jay Berelowitz	3:30
5.	"Like This"	Michael Stafford	Michael Stafford	2:57
6.	"Walk These Days"	Michael Stafford	Michael Stafford	2:31
7.	"Middle of Eden" (featuring Sasha Keable)	Michael Stafford; Sasha Keable; Owen Cutts	Owen Cutts	3:06
8.	"Can't Be Wrong"	Michael Stafford; Ben McKone; James McKone	Ben McKone; Michael Stafford	4:10
9.	"Time Away"	Michael Stafford; Ben McKone; James McKone	Ben McKone	4:06
10.	"Place and Time (Never Like This)"	Michael Stafford	Michael Stafford	2:06
11.	"Something Special"	Michael Stafford	Michael Stafford	4:17
12.	"Get Down"	Michael Stafford; Zachary Nahome	Zachary Nahome	3:13
