= Monster (Professor Green song) =

Single by Professor Green featuring Example

from the album Alive Till I'm Dead
- Released: 1 October 2010
- Recorded: 2010
- Genre: Electro hop; breakbeat
- Length: 3:08
- Label: Virgin
- Songwriters: Stephen Manderson; Elliot Gleave; James Murray; Mustafa Omer; Darren Lewis; Iyiola Babalola
- Producers: Mojam; Future Cut

Professor Green singles chronology
"Just Be Good to Green" (2010)	"Monster" (2010)	"Game Over" (2010)

Example singles chronology
"Last Ones Standing" (2010)	"Monster" (2010)	"Two Lives" (2010)

"Monster" is a song by British rapper Professor Green. This is the third single from his second album, Alive Till I'm Dead, featuring uncredited vocals from British singer and rapper Example. It was released on 1 October 2010 by digital download and on 4 October 2010 by CD single. The song was added to the BBC Radio 1 A-List.

== Critical reception ==
Fraser McAlpine of BBC Chart Blog gave the song a positive review stating:

Oh now this IS interesting. A Professor Green song which is not largely dependent on a sample from an older hit song, a chance for him to stand on his own two feet and put something which is wholly new out there into the world, now that he's got a bit of a platform to stand on and a LOT of people are listening. Here's the song which is designed to firmly cement the Prof in everyone's mind as a force for good in the world of music. Here's the song which says he can do it on his own. Here's the song which...well...does anyone else feel like something is missing?

I can't quite put my finger on what it is, either. I mean the Prof is the Prof innee? You either like that evil pixie voice of his or you don't. And if you're at all offended by his one-liners - the Peter Andre one is a particular favourite of mine - you'll have been just as irked by 'Just Be Good To Green'. But I'm not and I wasn't.

And it's not the lack of Lily Allen which is the root of the problem either. She did bring a fantastic face-slapping counterpoint to his daft bragging, but I think we're all old enough and clever enough to deal with someone showing off, aren't we?.

== Music video ==
At the beginning of the music video a sample from Professor Greens earlier songs Jungle can be heard on the radio playing in the background. The video for "Monster" was shot on location at Carnesky's Ghost Train based on Blackpool's Promenade. The majority of the scenes are shot on location but some scenes are shot on the Promenade showing the 2010 Illuminations. The video was directed by Henry Scholfield and featured scenery designed by Heckford.

== Track listing ==
CD single
No.	Title	Length
1.	"Monster"	3:08
2.	"Monster" (Totally Enormous Extinct Dinosaurs Remix)	4:32

Promo CD - remixes
No.	Title	Length
1.	"Monster" (Doman & Gooding Club Mix)	6:09
2.	"Monster" (Doman & Gooding Club Mix Clean)	6:09
3.	"Monster" (Doman & Gooding Club Mix Instrumental)	6:09
4.	"Monster" (Doman & Gooding Radio Mix)	3:54
5.	"Monster" (Doman & Gooding Radio Mix Clean)	3:54
6.	"Monster" (Doman & Gooding Radio Mix Instrumental)	3:54
7.	"Monster" (Totally Enormous Extinct Dinosaurs Remix)	4:33
8.	"Monster" (Totally Enormous Extinct Dinosaurs Remix Instrumental)	4:33
9.	"Monster" (Camo & Krooked Remix)	4:24
10.	"Monster" (Camo & Krooked Remix Instrumental)	4:16
11.	"Monster" (Radio Edit)	2:50
12.	"Monster" (Instrumental Edit)	3:09

iTunes EP
No.	Title	Length
1.	"Monster"	3:08
2.	"Monster" (Instrumental)	3:08
3.	"Monster" (Totally Enormous Extinct Dinosaurs Remix)	4:32
4.	"Monster" (Doman & Gooding Remix)	6:09
5.	"Monster" (Camo & Krooked Remix)	4:23

== Chart performance ==
"Monster" debuted on the UK Singles Chart at number 86 following strong downloading from the album, Alive Till I'm Dead, the single also debuted at number 26 on the UK R&B Chart. On 3 October 2010, the single re-entered the UK Top 100 at number 51 and climbed to number 13 on the R&B Chart. Upon release, the single climbed to number 29; marking Professor Green's third consecutive Top 40 single and Example's fifth consecutive Top 40 single.

Chart (2010)	Peak position
European Hot 100 Singles	83
Scotland Singles (OCC)	36
UK Singles (OCC)	29
UK Hip Hop/R&B (OCC)	13

== Certifications ==
Certifications for "Monster"
Region	Certification	Certified units/sales
United Kingdom (BPI)	Silver	200,000^{‡}
^{‡} Sales+streaming figures based on certification alone.

== Release history ==
Region	Date	Format	Label	Catalogue
United Kingdom	3 October 2010	Digital download	Virgin Records	B0041ON35U
United Kingdom	4 October 2010	CD single	Virgin Records	B0041ON35U
