= I Need (Maverick Sabre song) =

2011 single by Maverick Sabre

Single by Maverick Sabre

from the album Lonely Are the Brave
- Released: 4 November 2011
- Recorded: 2011
- Genre: R&B, soul
- Length: 3:58
- Label: Mercury
- Songwriters: Michael Stafford, Dan Radclyffe, Craig Merrin
- Producer: Utters

Maverick Sabre singles chronology
"Let Me Go" (2011)	"I Need" (2011)	"No One" (2012)

"I Need" is a song by Irish singer Maverick Sabre, from his debut studio album Lonely Are the Brave. It was released on 4 November 2011 as a digital download in the United Kingdom.

== Music video ==
A music video to accompany the release of "I Need" was first released onto YouTube on 16 September 2011 at a total length of four minutes and two seconds. In the video, Stafford travels back to his native town of New Ross. The video features many locals of the town and places like 'Aladdins cave' and 'New Ross Crystal'.

== Reception ==
Robert Copsey of Digital Spy gave the song a positive review stating:

Little more than strings, drums and an electric organ play out over Sabre's self-penned words about remembering the good ol' days. "I need blue skies/ I need them old times/ I need something good," he rap-sings is his inimitable twang on a gravelly chorus that burrows deeper into your brain with each listen. Don't worry mate, we have a sneaking suspicion that things will pick up again very soon..

== Track listing ==
Digital download
No.	Title	Length
1.	"I Need"	3:58
2.	"I Need" (Acoustic)	3:08
3.	"I Need" (Brookes Brothers Remix)	5:00
4.	"I Need" (Cookie Monsta Remix)	5:47
5.	"I Need" (Zed Bias Remix)	3:50
6.	"I Need" (Zed Bias Remix) (featuring Donae'o)	3:50
7.	"I Need" (Moto Blanco Remix)	6:43

== Charts ==
Chart (2011)	Peak position
Belgium (Ultratip Bubbling Under Flanders)	100
Belgium (Ultratip Bubbling Under Wallonia)	39
Ireland (IRMA)	32
Scotland Singles (OCC)	24
UK Singles (OCC)	18

== Certifications ==
Region	Certification	Certified units/sales
United Kingdom (BPI)	Platinum	600,000^{‡}
^{‡} Sales+streaming figures based on certification alone.

== Release history ==
Region	Date	Format	Label
United Kingdom	4 November 2011	Digital download	Mercury Records
