= Maverick Sabre =

Irish musician (born 1990)

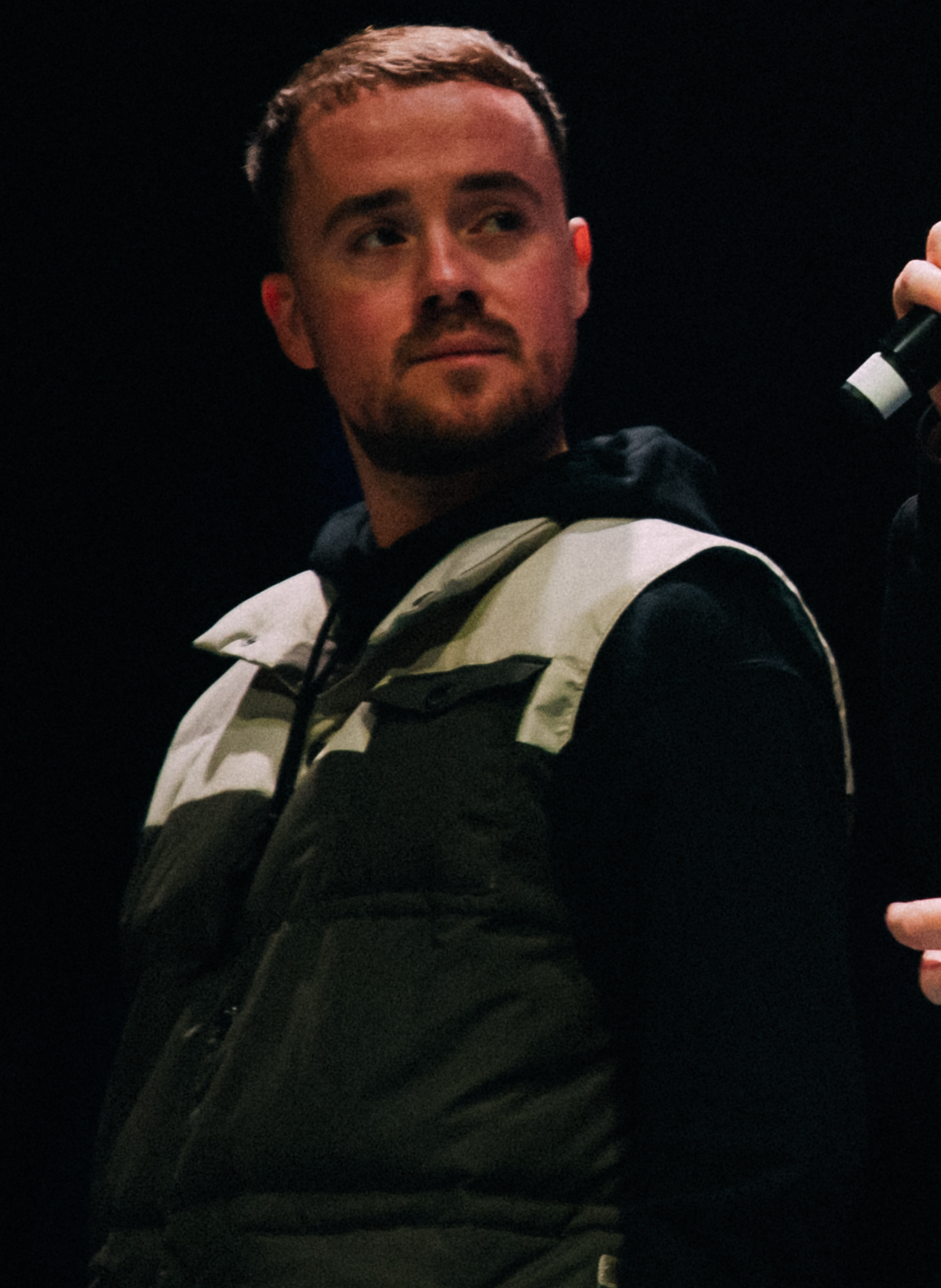
- Sabre in 2019

Background information
- Born: Michael Stafford; 12 July 1990 (age 36); Hackney, London, England
- Origin: New Ross, County Wexford, Ireland
- Genres: Soul; R&B; reggae fusion; post-dubstep; hip hop
- Occupations: Singer; songwriter; rapper; producer
- Instruments: Vocals, guitar, keyboards
- Years active: 2008–present
- Labels: Mercury (2011–2017); FAMM (2018–present)
- Website: mavericksabre.com

Michael Stafford (born 12 July 1990), known professionally as Maverick Sabre, is an Irish singer, songwriter, and rapper.

== Early life ==
Stafford was born in Stoke Newington, in Hackney, London. At age four, he moved with his family to New Ross, County Wexford, where he grew up, attending Good Counsel College. Following advice from English musician Plan B and Harry Jessop, he moved back to London to pursue a musical career.

== Career ==
Sabre's career began in 2008 when he appeared on the tracks "Lucky" and "Used to Blame" from the album Sense the Terror by Irish rappers Terawrizt and Nu-Centz. He also featured on rappers Johnnyboy and Intox's Propaganda EP and released his own tracks, such as "Lonely Side of Life" and "Fade Away". Sabre furthered his career in 2009 when he featured on Jermicide & Danny Digg's album Middle Class, collaborating on three tracks: "Afraid", "Where We Go to", and "Still With Me".

Maverick Sabre also performed on SB.TV with the song "They Found Him a Gun" and featured in BBC 1Xtra 'Jail Tales' programme, performing "These Walls". Sabre then returned to working with his earlier cohorts, featuring on Terawrizt's album Written in Stone and Terawrizt & Nu-Centz' album Sense The Terror 2, appearing on tracks such as "Life Fly By". On 25 November 2010, Sabre released his debut mixtape, The Travelling Man, in the United Kingdom. The release was a free digital download and featured the track "Sometimes" along with a promotional video to accompany the song.

On 6 January 2011, "Sometimes" was released as a single by Impala Records. Sabre guested on drum and bass duo Chase & Status's second studio album No More Idols, on "Fire in Your Eyes". He also features on "Sleepless", a song regularly performed live by Chase & Status, however no studio version has been released to date. Sabre featured on Professor Green's fourth single "Jungle", released on 1 January 2010, which was featured on the album Alive Till I'm Dead. The single debuted at number 34 on the UK Singles Chart, peaking at 31 the following week. On 28 February 2011, Maverick released his debut single "Look What I Done", taken from the extended play The Lost Words, released on 7 March 2011. On 19 April 2011, Sabre performed with a live band on BBC Two's Later… with Jools Holland.

After his performance of Oasis's "Wonderwall" on Chris Moyles' BBC Radio 1 Comic Relief show, Maverick's extended play The Lost Words reached number 2 in the iTunes Store Top Ten Songs chart. In 2011, he also appeared on The Script's Science & Faith Tour supporting the Irish band, and performed his song "Let Me Go", which entered the UK Singles Chart at number 16 in August 2011.

On 25 July 2011, Sabre's first single "Let Me Go" was released and entered the UK chart at number 16. He released his debut album, Lonely Are The Brave, on 6 February 2012. He then released singles "I Need", "What Have I Done To You" and "No One". Sabre featured on a remix of his song "I Need" with rappers Chipmunk and Benny Banks. He then featured on the track "We'll Never Know" alongside rappers Akala and Logic. On 29 January 2012, Sabre appeared on the Sunday Night Sessions segment of The Late Show with Joanne Good on BBC London 94.9.

Sabre appeared on the 2012 remake album Jeff Wayne's Musical Version of The War of the Worlds - The New Generation in the role of Parson Nathaniel. The role was performed by Jason Donovan in the 2012–2014 live shows. Around this time, Sabre started working with a teenage Jorja Smith and she became his protégé, who he ultimately introduced to the UK.

On 9 April 2014, Sabre released a video for the single "Breathe". On 24 July 2014, Sabre released a video for the remix from "Emotion (Ain't Nobody)", featuring Chip, Devlin and George the Poet. The album was released on 31 October 2015. Sabre was also featured on the track "Carry Me Home" from Jorja Smith's album Project 11, released on 17 November 2016.

On 22 March 2019, Sabre released his third studio album titled When I Wake Up on his own imprint FAMM. The record was promoted by the singles "Drifting", "Her Grace" (featuring Chronixx), "Slow Down"(featuring Jorja Smith) and "Glory". On 26 March 2020, "Glory" was featured on American medical drama Grey's Anatomy episode "Love of My Life".

In June 2020, Sabre announced a new EP titled You Know How It Feels, scheduled to be released on 24 July 2020 via FAMM. The EP is promoted by lead single "Signs" released on 26 June.

On 28 January 2022 Sabre released his fourth studio album Don't Forget to Look Up.

== Political views ==
In November 2019, Sabre endorsed the Labour Party in the 2019 UK general election. In a 2022 interview with Hot Press, he opined that a lot of trust had been lost in the Irish government, and that anger should be directed upwards at the government rather than "the immigrant, or the person who's on benefits, or the single mum".

== Discography ==
- Lonely Are the Brave (2012)
- Innerstanding (2015)
- When I Wake Up (2019)
- Don't Forget to Look Up (2022)
- Burn the Right Things Down (2024)
