= True Tiger =

True Tiger are a dubstep/grime production group, formerly composed of Sukh Knight, Gowers, Blue Bear, Stanza & Chunky. The group disbanded in early 2014.

== Singles ==
Year	Single	Peak chart position	Album
Year	Single	UK	Album
2011	"In the Air"	52	TBA
