= Our Version of Events Tour =

2011–13 concert tour by Emeli Sandé

- Debut tour by Emeli Sandé
- Location: Europe • North America • Asia
- Associated album: Our Version of Events
- Start date: 1 November 2011
- End date: 31 December 2013
- Legs: 21
- No. of shows: 106 in Europe; 51 in North America; 1 in Middle East; 158 in Total
- Website: http://www.emelisande.com/live-dates/

Emeli Sandé concert chronology
- Our Version of Events Tour (2011–13); Long Live the Angels Tour (2017)

Our Version of Events Tour was a debut global concert tour by Scottish singer Emeli Sandé, in support of her 2012 debut album, Our Version of Events. The tour ran for over two years from 2011 till 2013, covering five continents in the process.

== The tour ==
In 2011, Sandé played a small series of intimate shows in the United Kingdom in November 2011, before supporting British rock-alternative band Coldplay on their Europe leg of their Mylo Xyloto Tour in December 2011, including gigs in Glasgow, Manchester, London, Paris, Amsterdam, Hamburg, Berlin and Cologne.

From January 2012 till April 2012, she performed acoustic intimate shows in North America, including gigs in New York City, San Francisco, Los Angeles and Chicago. Sandé also performed a leg of dates in Europe. In May 2012, she performed several dates at the Official Celebrations Concerts for 2012 Summer London Olympic Torch Relay celebrations. She performed in Cardiff at Coopers Field, Glasgow in June then Inverness, Aberdeen, Dundee and Edinburgh. She then performed at Radio 1's Big Weekend at Hackney Marshes, and the Lovebox Festival.

In July 2012, Sandé performed at her first major festival at Scotland's T in the Park in Kinross and other festivals around Europe. She also performed Abide with me at the opening ceremony of the 2012 London Summer Olympics. She then returned to North America to support Coldplay again, in Toronto, Boston, Detroit and East Rutherford along with Welsh singer-songwriter and musician Marina and the Diamonds. In August and September 2012, Sandé performed at the closing ceremony of the Olympics, V Festival, BBC Radio 2: Live at Hyde Park, Bestival, iTunes Festival and Belsonic Festival in Belfast.

From November 2012 to December 2012, Sandé performed special long shows in Dublin, Glasgow, Birmingham, Manchester, and at London's Royal Albert Hall on 11 November 2012. This concert was filmed and released as DVD in February 2013. Sandé performed two shows in Canada in November 2012, as well as performing at Hammersmith Apollo in London in December 2012 as part of the Crisis Homeless Fundraising Christmas Concert with Paul Weller, Miles Kane and Ben Elton.

In 2013, Emeli Sandé performed a massive leg of dates in North America between January and February 2013, before returning to Europe and United Kingdom, between March and April 2013. She finished European campaign in her hometown Aberdeen, performing two intimate shows at the Music Hall in Aberdeen on 19 April 2013. She performed two small North America legs in July and August 2013. In August 2013 Sandé, performed at the Made in America festival.

In September 2013, Sandé performed at London's O2 Arena to perform tribute to Stephen Lawrence, along with Ed Sheeran, Rudimental, Plan B, Jessie J, Labrinth, Jamie Cullum, Soul II Soul, Rizzle Kicks, Tinie Tempah, Rita Ora and Beverley Knight. In October 2013, Sandé returned to North America for final leg of the tour.

== Main setlists ==
Setlist 1 – United Kingdom (2011)
- 1. Tiger
- 2. Lifetime
- 3. Daddy (featuring Naughty Boy)
- 4. Next To Me
- 5. My Kind of Love
- 6. Mountains
- 7. Suitcase
- 8. Maybe

Encore:

- 9. Heaven
Setlist 2 – Europe (2012)
- 1. Daddy (featuring Naughty Boy)
- 2. Tiger
- 3. Suitcase
- 4. Where I Sleep
- 5. Clown
- 6. Breaking the Law
- 7. My Kind of Love
- 8. Read All About It (Part III)
- 9. Lifetime
- 10. Maybe
- 11. River
- 12. Hope
- 13. Wonder
- 14. Mountains
- 15. Heaven

Encore:

- 16. Next To Me
Setlist 3 – United Kingdom (November: 2012)
- 1. Daddy (featuring Naughty Boy)
- 2. Tiger
- 3. Where I Sleep
- 4. Breaking The Law (Ballad Intro)
- 5. Enough (New song)
- 6. Pluto (New song)
- 7. My Kind of Love
- 8. Abide with Me
- 9. Clown
- 10. River
- 11. I Wish I Knew How It Would Feel to Be Free (Nina Simone cover)
- 12. Suitcase
- 13. Read All About It (Part III)
- 14. Wonder
- 15. Mountains
- 16. Heaven

Encore:

- 17. Maybe
- 18. Next To Me
Setlist 4 – North America (January 2013)
- 1. Heaven (Ballad Intro)
- 2. Tiger
- 3. Where I Sleep (Reggae Version)
- 4. Breaking the Law (Alternative Version)
- 5. Suitcase
- 6. My Kind of Love
- 7. Clown
- 8. River
- 9. Mountains
- 10. Daddy (featuring Naughty Boy)
- 11. Wonder
- 12. Next To Me

Encore:

- 13. Maybe
- 14. Read All About It (Part III)
Setlist 5 – Europe (March/April 2013)
- 1. Heaven (Ballad Intro)
- 2. Where I Sleep (Reggae Version)
- 3. Breaking the Law (Alternative Version)
- 4. Suitcase
- 5. Half of It (New Song)
- 6. Pluto
- 7. My Kind of Love
- 8. Clown
- 9. River (at selected dates only)
- 10. Read All About It, Pt. III
- 11. Beneath Your Beautiful – with Male Backing Vocalist
- 12. Daddy (featuring Naughty Boy)
- 13. Kill The Boy (at selected dates only)
- 14. Wonder

Encore:

- 17. Mountains
- 16. Next to Me

Notes • Emeli did not perform "Mountains" during the gig at Casino de Paris, Paris on 4 March 2013. • Emeli did not perform "River" in the following dates... (13, 15, 16, 17, 19, 20 March 2013). • Emeli performed "Kill the Boy" in Birmingham (26 March 2013). This is only date of UK Leg at Emeli will perform this song. • Emeli did not perform "Half of It" in Manchester (3 April 2013), Brighton (5 April 2013) or Bristol (4 April 2013).

• During the Hammersmith Apollo (2nd Night) gig... Labrinth once again joined Emeli on stage for "Beneath Your Beautiful".
Setlist 6 – North America (July–August, October 2013)
- 1. Daddy
- 2. Heaven
- 3. Where I Sleep (Reggae Version)
- 4. Breaking The Law (Alternative Version)
- 5. Free
- 6. Suitcase
- 7. My Kind of Love
- 8. Clown
- 9. Beneath Your Beautiful – with Male Backing Vocalists
- 10. Who Needs The World (New Song)
- 11. River
- 12. Read All About It (Part III)
- 13. Lifted
- 14. Wonder
- Encore
- 15. Maybe
- 16. Next to Me

== Other setlists ==
Supporting Coldplay (2011)
- 1. Tiger
- 2. Lifetime
- 3. Next To Me
- 4. Breaking The Law
- 5. My Kind of Love
- 6. Daddy (featuring Naughty Boy)
- 7. Hope
- 8. Mountains
- 9. Heaven
North America (Setlist 1)

Please Note All these songs were performed Acoustic.

- 1. Daddy (featuring Naughty Boy)
- 2. Tiger
- 3. Breaking The Law
- 4. My Kind of Love
- 5. Wonder (With Naughty Boy)
- 6. Read All About It (Pt. III)
- 7. Where I Sleep
- 8. Heaven
- 9. Next To Me
Olympic Torch Relay Concerts

Cardiff and Glasgow

- 1. Heaven
- 2. Tiger
- 3. Where I Sleep
- 4. Daddy (featuring Naughty Boy)
- 5. Breaking The Law
- 6. My Kind of Love
- 7. Wonder (With Naughty Boy)
- 8. Next To Me

Inverness, Aberdeen, Dundee and Edinburgh

- 1. Heaven
- 2. My Kind of Love
- 3. Wonder (With Naughty Boy)
- 4. Next To Me
Festivals (2012)

Lovebox and Radio 1's Big Hackney Weekend

- 1. Heaven
- 2. Breaking The Law
- 3. My Kind of Love
- 4. Wonder (With Naughty Boy)
- 5. Where I Sleep (Reggae and Sunshine remix)
- 6. Next To Me

Lounge on the Farm, T in the Park, Italy and Switzerland

- 1. Heaven
- 2. Breaking The Law
- 3. My Kind of Love
- 4. Wonder (With Naughty Boy)
- 5. Read All About It (Pt. III)
- 6. Where I Sleep (Reggae and Sunshine remix)
- 7. Next To Me
Supporting Coldplay (2012)
- 1. Heaven
- 2. Breaking The Law
- 3. My Kind of Love
- 4. Wonder (With Naughty Boy)
- 5. Where I Sleep
- 6. Mountains
- 7. Daddy (featuring Naughty Boy)
- 8. Suitcase
- 9. Next To Me
Belfast (2012)
- 1. Heaven
- 2. Every Teardrop Is a Waterfall (Coldplay cover)
- 3. Tiger
- 4. Clown
- 5. Suitcase
- 6. Daddy (featuring Naughty Boy)
- 7. My Kind of Love
- 8. Breaking The Law
- 9. Read All About It (Pt. III)
- 10. Mountains
- 11. Wonder (With Naughty Boy)
- 12. Where I Sleep
- 13. One Love/No Woman, No Cry
- 13. Next To Me
Dublin (2012)
- 1. Daddy (featuring Naughty Boy)
- 2. Tiger
- 3. Suitcase
- 4. Where I Sleep (Reggae Version)
- 5. Clown
- 6. Breaking The Law
- 7. My Kind of Love
- 8. Read All About It (Pt. III)
- 9. Lifetime
- 10. Maybe
- 11. River
- 12. Hope
- 13. Wonder (With Naughty Boy)
- 14. Mountains
- 15. Heaven

Encore:

- 16. Next To Me
V Festival (2012)
- 1. Heaven
- 2. Every Teardrop is a Waterfall (Coldplay cover)
- 3. Breaking The Law
- 4. My Kind of Love
- 5. Read All About It (Pt. III)
- 6. Wonder (With Naughty Boy)
- 7. Where I Sleep
- 8. One Love / No Woman, No Cry
- 9. Next To Me
iTunes Festival (2012)
- 1. Daddy (featuring Naughty Boy)
- 2. Tiger
- 3. Every Teardrop is a Waterfall (Coldplay cover)
- 4. Clown
- 5. My Kind of Love
- 6. Suitcase (Bass Version)
- 7. Breaking The Law (New Version)
- 8. Maybe
- 9. Read All About It (Pt. III)
- 10. Wonder (With Naughty Boy)
- 11. Mountains
- 12. Where I Sleep (Reggae Version)
- 13. One Love / No Woman, No Cry (Bob Marley & The Wailers cover)
- 14. Heaven

Encore:

- 15. Next To Me
Royal Albert Hall (2012)
- 1. Daddy
- 2. Tiger
- 3. Where I Sleep
- 4. Breaking The Law (Ballad Intro))
- 5. Enough (New song)
- 6. Pluto (New song)
- 7. My Kind of Love
- 8. Abide with Me
- 9. Clown
- 10. River
- 11. I Wish I Knew How It Would Feel to Be Free (Nina Simone cover)
- 12. Suitcase
- 13. Read All About It (Part III) (With Professor Green)
- 14. Wonder
- 15. Mountains
- 16. Heaven (Ballad Intro)

Encore:

- 17. Beneath Your Beautiful (With Labrinth)
- 18. Maybe
- 19. Next To Me
Canada (2012)
- 1. Daddy (featuring Naughty Boy)
- 2. Tiger
- 3. Where I Sleep
- 4. Suitcase
- 5. Every Teardrop is a Waterfall (Coldplay cover)
- 6. Clown
- 7. I Wish I Knew How It Would Feel to Be Free (Nina Simone cover)
- 8. My Kind of Love
- 9. Maybe
- 10. Wonder (With Naughty Boy)
- 11. Mountains
- 12. Heaven
- 13. Next To Me

Encore:'

- 14. Breaking The Law (Alternative version)
- 16. Read All About It (Part III)
Radio 2 Concert
- 1. Heaven
- 2. Where I Sleep
- 3. Breaking The Law
- 4. Clown
- 5. River
- 6. Suitcase
- 7. My Kind of Love
- 8. Maybe
- 9. Read All About It (Part III)
- 10. Daddy
- 11. Wonder
- 12. Mountains
- 13. Next To Me
T in the Park and Wireless (2013)
- 1. Daddy – Acoustic
- 2. Heaven
- 3. Where I Sleep
- 4. Breaking the Law
- 5. Free
- 6. My Kind of Love
- 7. Clown
- 8. Beneath Your Beautiful – with male backing vocalist
- 9. Read All About It (Part III)
- 10. Lifted
- 11. Wonder
- 12. Next to Me
Lollapalooza (2013)
- 1. Heaven
- 2. Breaking the Law
- 3. My Kind of Love
- 4. Read All About It (Part III)
- 5. Lifted
- 6. One Day
- 7. Wonder
- 8. Next to Me

== Opening acts ==
- Seye (April 2012, United Kingdom)
- Daley (April 2012, selected dates)
- Josh Osho (April 2012, selected dates)
- Jess Mills (April, selected dates)
- Jess Mills (April, selected dates)
- Lisa McLaughlin (15 August 2012)
- Foy Vance (16 August 2012)
- Duke Special (16 August 2012)
- Gabrielle Aplin (5 September 2012)
- Bastille (5 September 2012)
- Emily King (UK: November 2012) (US: January/February 2013)
- Paul Weller (Co-Headlining: 19 December 2012)
- Miles Kane (Co-Headlining: 19 December 2012)
- Ben Elton (Co-Headlining: 19 December 2012)
- Skylar Grey (Los Angeles: 11 February 2013)
- Charlene Soraia (Europe: March/April 2013, selected dates)
- Lulu James (Europe: March/April 2013, selected dates) (London: Hammersmith Apollo "Night 3", April 2013)
- Jacob Banks (United Kingdom: Birmingham, Brighton, Bristol and London "Night 1", March/April 2013)
- Sam Smith (United Kingdom: Newcastle, Edinburgh, Manchester and London "Night 2", March/April 2013)
- Mahalia (London: Hammersmith Apollo dates and Aberdeen: Music Hall Shows, April 2013)
- Rudimental (Las Vegas: House of Blues, New York: Rumsey Playfield, Central Park and Boston: House of Blues. August 2013)
- Evan Taylor (Orlando, Florida: House of Blues, July 2013)
- Heston (Atlanta, Georgia: The Tabernacle, July 2013)
- JOHNNYSWIM (North America – October 2013 leg)
- Ivy Levan (North America – October 2013 leg)

== Tour dates ==
Date	City	Country	Venue
Europe
16 September 2010	Inverness	Scotland	Madhatters
18 September 2010	Thurso	Scotland	Skinandis
22 September 2010	Glasgow	Scotland	King Tut's Wah Wah Hut
23 September 2010	Edinburgh	Scotland	Electric Circus
14 November 2010	Edinburgh	Scotland	Electric Circus
15 November 2010	Glasgow	Scotland	King Tut's Wah Wah Hut
1 November 2011	Glasgow	Scotland	Òran Mór
2 November 2011	Edinburgh	Scotland	The Caves
3 November 2011	Manchester	England	Deaf Institute
5 November 2011	Bristol	England	The Fleece
6 November 2011	Brighton	England	Ballroom
7 November 2011	London	England	Tabernacle
24 November 2011	London	England	St John's, Smith Square
29 November 2011	London	England	KOKO
3 December 2011 A	Glasgow	Scotland	Scottish Exhibition and Conference Centre
4 December 2011 B	London	England	The O2 Arena
9 December 2011 C	London	England	The O2 Arena
10 December 2011 C	London	England	The O2 Arena
13 December 2011	Dublin	Ireland	The Sugar Club
14 December 2011 C	Paris	France	Palais Omnisports de Paris-Bercy
15 December 2011 C	Cologne	Germany	Lanxess Arena
17 December 2011 C	Rotterdam	Netherlands	Rotterdam Ahoy
18 December 2011 C	Antwerp	Belgium	Sportpaleis
20 December 2011 C	Frankfurt	Germany	Festhalle Frankfurt
21 December 2011 C	Berlin	Germany	The O_{2} World
11 January 2012 D	Groningen	Netherlands	Eurosonic Noorderslag
9 February 2012	London	England	KoKo
United States (Acoustic Sets: Leg 1)
2 March 2012	San Francisco	United States	Café du Nord, Swedish-American Hall
5 March 2012	Minneapolis	United States	Dakota Jazz Club And Restaurant
Europe
7 March 2012	London	England	Royal Festival Hall
9 March 2012	London	England	Royal Festival Hall (shortened set for 'Equals Live 2012', with Annie Lennox, Katy B and Jess Mills)
26 March 2012	Paris	France	Alhambra
28 March 2012	Berlin	Germany	Festsaal Kreuzberg
29 March 2012	Cologne	Germany	Gloria-Theater
31 March 2012	Amsterdam	Netherlands	Paradiso
2 April 2012	Brussels	Belgium	Cirque Royal
4 April 2012	Norwich	United Kingdom	Norwich U.E.A
5 April 2012	Leeds	United Kingdom	O2 Academy Leeds
6 April 2012	Aberdeen	United Kingdom	Music Hall
9 April 2012	Liverpool	United Kingdom	O2 Academy Liverpool
10 April 2012	Glasgow	United Kingdom	Old Fruitmarket
12 April 2012	Manchester	United Kingdom	The Ritz
13 April 2012	Cardiff	United Kingdom	Cardiff University Students' Union
14 April 2012	Birmingham	United Kingdom	Digbeth Institute
16 April 2012	London	United Kingdom	O_{2} Shepherd's Bush Empire
United States (Acoustic Sets: Leg 2)
18 April 2012	Los Angeles	United States	Bootleg Theater
24 April 2012	New York City	United States	Music Hall of Williamsburg
Wales
25 May 2012 E	Cardiff	Wales	Coopers Field
United States (Acoustic Sets: Leg 3)
30 May 2012	Los Angeles	United States	El Rey Theatre
1 June 2012	Chicago	United States	Lincoln Hall
4 June 2012	New York City	United States	Bowery Ballroom
Europe
8 June 2012 E	Glasgow	Scotland	George Square
9 June 2012 E	Inverness	Scotland	Northern Meeting Park
11 June 2012 E	Aberdeen	Scotland	Castlegate
12 June 2012 E	Dundee	Scotland	Baxter's Park
13 June 2012 E	Edinburgh	Scotland	Edinburgh Castle, Esplanade
15 June 2012 F	London	England	Victoria Park
23 June 2012 G	London	England	Hackney Marshes
6 July 2012 H	Lower Hardres	England	Lounge On The Farm
8 July 2012 I	Kinross	Scotland	T in the Park
9 July 2012 J	Rome	Italy	Luglio Suona Bene Festival
10 July 2012 K	Tortona	Italy	Arena Derthona Music Festival
14 July 2012 L	Montreux	Switzerland	Montreux Jazz Festival
14 July 2012	Montreux	Switzerland	Miles Davis Hall
Canada (Supporting Coldplay)
23 July 2012M	Toronto	Canada	Air Canada Centre
24 July 2012 M	Toronto	Canada	Air Canada Centre
England (Opening Ceremony of 2012 Summer Olympics)
27 July 2012 N	London	England	Olympic Stadium
United States (Supporting Coldplay)
29 July 2012 O	Boston	United States	TD Garden
30 July 2012 O	Boston	United States	TD Garden
1 August 2012 O	Auburn Hills	United States	The Palace of Auburn Hills
3 August 2012 O	East Rutherford	United States	Izod Center
4 August 2012 O	East Rutherford	United States	Izod Center
Europe
12 August 2012 P	London	England	Olympic Stadium
15 August 2012	Dublin	Ireland	Olympia Theatre
16 August 2012 Q	Belfast	United Kingdom	Belsonic
18 August 2012 R	Weston-under-Lizard	United Kingdom	Weston Park
19 August 2012 R	Chelmsford	United Kingdom	Hylands Park
5 September 2012 S	London	United Kingdom	Roundhouse
7 September 2012 T	Isle of Wight	United Kingdom	Bestival
13 September 2012 U	Kotor	Montenegro	Maximus
5 November 2012	Dublin	Ireland	Olympia Theatre
6 November 2012	Glasgow	United Kingdom	Clyde Auditorium
8 November 2012	Birmingham	United Kingdom	Symphony Hall
11 December 2012 V	London	United Kingdom	Royal Albert Hall
12 November 2012	Manchester	United Kingdom	Bridgewater Hall
Canada
23 November 2012	Toronto	Canada	The Opera House
24 November 2012	Montreal	Canada	Métropolis
England
19 December 2012 W	London	England	Hammersmith Apollo
United States
12 January 2013	Atlanta	United States	Variety Playhouse
14 January 2013	Washington, D.C.	United States	Howard Theatre
15 January 2013	Boston	United States	Paradise Rock Club
17 January 2013	New York City	United States	Webster Hall
19 January 2013	Philadelphia	United States	The TLA
21 January 2013	Pontiac	United States	Pike room @The Crofoot
23 January 2013	Minneapolis	United States	Varsity Theater
1 February 2013	Seattle	United States	The Crocodile
2 February 2013	Portland	United States	Doug Fir Lounge
4 February 2013	San Francisco	United States	The Independent
6 February 2013	Los Angeles	United States	El Rey Theatre
11 February 2013 X	West Hollywood	United States	The Key Club
Europe
28 February 2013 Y	London	England	BBC Radio Theatre
4 March 2013	Paris	France	Casino de Paris
5 March 2013	Brussels	Belgium	Ancienne Belgique
6 March 2013 Z	London	England	Wembley Arena
8 March 2013	Lille	France	Aeronef
9 March 2013	Lyon	France	Transbordeur
11 March 2013	Hamburg	Germany	Grose Freiheit
12 March 2013	Copenhagen	Denmark	Vega
13 March 2013	Berlin	Germany	Huxleys
15 March 2013	Zürich	Switzerland	Maag
16 March 2013	Turin	Italy	Teatro Colosseo
17 March 2013	Munich	Germany	Tontalle
19 March 2013	Offenbach am Main	Germany	Stadthalle Offenbach
20 March 2013	Luxembourg	Luxembourg	Rockhal
22 March 2013	Cologne	Germany	E-Werk
23 March 2013	Amsterdam	Netherlands	Paradiso
24 March 2013	Amsterdam	Netherlands	Paradiso
26 March 2013	Birmingham	United Kingdom	O2 Academy Birmingham
27 March 2013	Birmingham	United Kingdom	O2 Academy Birmingham
29 March 2013	Newcastle	United Kingdom	Newcastle City Hall
30 March 2013	Newcastle	United Kingdom	Newcastle City Hall
1 April 2013	Edinburgh	United Kingdom	Usher Hall
2 April 2013	Manchester	United Kingdom	O2 Apollo Manchester
3 April 2013	Manchester	United Kingdom	O2 Apollo Manchester
5 April 2013	Brighton	United Kingdom	Brighton Dome
6 April 2013	Bristol	United Kingdom	Colston Hall
8 April 2013	London	United Kingdom	Hammersmith Apollo
9 April 2013	London	United Kingdom	Hammersmith Apollo
10 April 2013	London	United Kingdom	Hammersmith Apollo
16 April 2013	Brussels	Belgium	Ancienne Belgique
19 April 2013	Aberdeen	Scotland	Music Hall
19 April 2013	Aberdeen	Scotland	Music Hall
22 April 2013 AA	London	England	St James's Theatre
California, United States
26 April 2013	New York City	United States	Terminal 5
10 May 2013 BB'	Chula Vista	United States	Sleep Train Amphitheatre
Isle of Wight, England
14 June 2013 CC	Isle of Wight	England	Isle of Wight Festival
United States
2 July 2013	Orlando	United States	House of Blues
3 July 2013	Atlanta	United States	The Tabernacle
5 July 2013	New Orleans	United States	Essence Festival 2013 @ Mercedes-Benz Superdome
8 July 2013	Houston	United States	House of Blues
9 July 2013	Dallas	United States	House of Blues
United Kingdom – Summer Festivals
12 July 2013 DD	Kinross	Scotland	T in the Park 2013
13 July 2012 EE	London	England	Wireless Festival
United States
1 August 2013	Minneapolis	United States	Pantages Theatre
2 August 2013 FF	Chicago	United States	Grant Park
9 August 2013	Las Vegas	United States	House of Blues
11 August 2013 GG	San Francisco	United States	Outside Lands Music and Arts Festival
V Festival, England
18 August 2013 HH	Chelmsford	England	Hylands Park
19 August 2013 HH	Weston-under-Lizard	England	Weston Park
United States
28 August 2013	New York City	United States	Rumsey Playfield, Central Park
30 August 2013	Boston	United States	House of Blues
31 August 2013 II	Philadelphia	United States	Made in America Festival 2013
1 September 2013 II	Philadelphia	United States	Made in America Festival 2013
London – United Kingdom JJ
29 September 2013	London	England	O2 Arena
United States
11 October 2013	Miami	United States	The Fillmore Miami Beach
19 October 2013	Baltimore	United States	Joseph Meyerhoff Symphony Hall
21 October 2013	Columbus	United States	Newport Music Hall
23 October 2013	Nashville	United States	Ryman Auditorium
26 October 2013	Chicago	United States	The Vic Theatre
London – United Kingdom KK
4 November 2013	London	England	KoKo
Middle East LL
31 December 2013	Dubai	United Arab Emirates	New Year Eve Celebrations 2013/14

Special Events, Festivals, TV Appearances etc.

- A' – Emeli supported Coldplay on their Mylo Xyloto Tour in Glasgow, Scotland.
- B – Emeli performed at Capital FM's Jingle Bell Ball.
- C' – Emeli supported Coldplay on their Mylo Xyloto Tour on their Europe Leg in December 2011.
- D – Emeli performed at Eurosonic Noorderslag Festival, 2012 in the Netherlands.
- E – Emeli performed at 2012 Summer Olympics torch relay celebrations in Cardiff and Scotland.
- F – Emeli performed at London's Lovebox Festival 2012 in Victoria Park.
- G – Emeli performed at BBC 1's Big Weekend in Hackney Marshes, London.
- H – Emeli performed at Lounge On The Farm in Kent, England.
- I – Emeli performed at T in the Park 2012 in Kinross, Scotland.
- J – Emeli performed at Luglio Suona Bene Festival 2012 in Rome, Italy.
- K – Emeli performed at Arena Derthona Music Festival 2012 in Tortona, Italy.
- L – Emeli performed at Montreux Jazz Festival in Montreux, Switzerland.
- M – Emeli supported Coldplay on their Mylo Xyloto Tour in Toronto, Canada.
- N – Emeli performed at 2012 Summer Olympics opening ceremony in Olympic Stadium, London, England.
- O – Emeli supported Coldplay on their Mylo Xyloto Tour in on their North America Leg in July/August 2012.
- P – Emeli performed at 2012 Summer Olympics closing ceremony in Olympic Stadium, London, England.
- Q – Emeli performed at Belsonic Festival 2012, in Belfast, Northern Ireland.
- R – Emeli performed at V Festival 2012 in Hylands Park and Weston Park, England.
- S – Emeli performed at iTunes Festival 2012 in Roundhouse, London.
- T – Emeli performed at Bestival Festival 2012 in Isle of Wight, England.
- U – Emeli performed at Maximus 2012 in Kotor, Montenegro.
- V – Emeli's performance at Royal Albert Hall, London, England was filmed as a DVD and CD.
- W – Emeli performed at Crisis Homeless Fundraising Christmas Concert with Paul Weller, Miles Kane and Ben Elton at Hammersmith Apollo, London, England.
- X – Emeli performed at Chapstick's concert in West Hollywood, US
- Y – Emeli performed at BBC Radio 2's Concert at BBC Radio Theatre, London, England.
- Z – Emeli performed at Give it Up for Comic Relief at Wembley Arena, London, England.
- AA – Emeli performed at a Priceless Acoustic-Set Gig in London, at St James's Theatre for MasterCard.
- BB – Emeli performed at Channel 933 Summer Kickoff festival in Chula Vista, California, United States.
- CC – Emeli performed at Isle of Wight Festival 2013.
- DD – Emeli performed at T in the Park Festival 2013, in Kinross, Scotland.
- EE – Emeli performed at Wireless Festival 2013, in London, England.
- FF – Emeli performed at Lollapalooza Festival 2013 in Chicago, United States.
- GG – Emeli performed at Outside Lands Music and Arts Festival in San Francisco, United States.
- HH – Emeli performed at V Festival 2013, in Hylands Park and Weston Park, England.
- II – Emeli performed at Made in America Festival 2013, Philadelphia, United States.
- JJ – Emeli performed at The Tribute Concert to Stephen Lawrence at The O2 Arena in London on 29 September 2013
- KK – Emeli performed at 40th Anniversary Concerts for Virgin Records at Koko in London, 4 November 2013.
- LL – Emeli performed at New Year Eve celebrations in Dubai, 31 December 2013.
