= List of awards and nominations received by Emeli Sandé =

Emeli Sandé awards and nominations
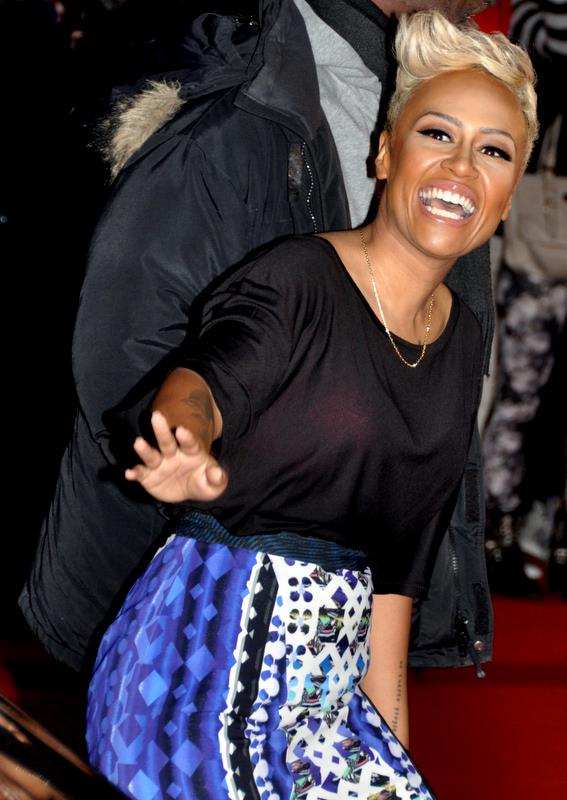
- Sandé at the NRJ Music Awards 2013
Awards and nominations
Award	Wins	Nominations

Totals (Note: Certain award groups do not simply award one winner. They acknowledge several different recipients, have runners-up, and have third place. Since this is a specific recognition and is different from losing an award, runner-up mentions are considered wins in this award tally. For simplification and to avoid errors, each award in this list has been presumed to have had a prior nomination.)
- Wins: 22
- Nominations: 57

Emeli Sandé is a British singer and songwriter. Following the success of her debut album, Our Version of Events, she has won several awards, including four BRIT Awards and three MOBO Awards. In total, Sandé has received 22 awards from 57 nominations.

== BBC Music Awards ==
The BBC Music Awards are the annual pop music award presented by the BBC. Sandé has been nominated once.

Year	Nominee/work	Award	Result	Ref.
2016	"Hurts"	BBC Radio 1 Live Lounge Performance of the Year	Nominated	

== BBC Radio 1's Teen Awards ==
Sandé has been nominated three times.

Year	Nominee/work	Award	Result	Ref.
2012	"Read All About It"	Best British Single	Nominated	
2012	Our Version of Events	Best British Album	Nominated	
2012	Emeli Sandé	Best British Music Act	Nominated	

== BET Awards ==
The BET Awards are presented annually by Black Entertainment Television. Sandé has one win from three nominations.

Year	Nominee/work	Award	Result	Ref.
2012	Emeli Sandé	Best International Artist UK	Nominated	
2013	Emeli Sandé	Best International Artist UK	Won	
2017	Emeli Sandé	Best International Act Europe	Nominated	

== Brit Awards ==
The Brit Awards are the annual pop music awards by the British Phonographic Industry (BPI). Sandé has four wins from seven nominations.

Year	Nominee/work	Award	Result	Ref.
2012	Emeli Sandé	Critics' Choice Award	Won	
2012	Emeli Sandé	British Breakthrough Act	Nominated	
2013	Emeli Sandé	British Female Solo Artist	Won	
2013	Our Version of Events	British Album of the Year	Won	
2013	"Next to Me"	British Single of the Year	Nominated	
2013	"Beneath Your Beautiful"	British Single of the Year	Nominated	
2017	Emeli Sandé	British Female Solo Artist	Won	

== Echo Music Prize ==
The Echo Music Prize was a German music award, presented annually from 1992 to 2018 by German Phono-Akademie, the cultural institute of the German Music Industry Association (BVMI), to recognize outstanding and successful works of national and international music artists. Award winners were determined by representatives of record companies, music publishers, artists, critics, and other professionals within the German music industry. Sandé was nominated twice.

Year	Nominee/work	Award	Result	Ref.
2013	Emeli Sandé	International Female Artist	Nominated	
2013	Emeli Sandé	International Newcomer	Nominated	

== Elle Style Awards ==
The Elle Style Awards are an awards ceremony hosted annually by Elle magazine. Sandé has one win from one nomination.

Year	Nominee/work	Award	Result	Ref.
2013	Emeli Sandé	Best Music Act	Won	

== European Border Breakers Award ==
The European Border Breakers Award (EBBA) is an annual prize awarded to recognise the success of ten emerging artists or groups who reached audiences outside their own countries with their first internationally released album. Sandé won the award in 2013.

Year	Nominee/work	Award	Result	Ref.
2013	Our Version of Events	EBBA Award 2013	Won	

== Harper's Bazaar Women of the Year Awards ==
Harper’s Bazaar is an American women's fashion magazine published by Hearst. The magazine's Musician of the Year honor was awarded to Sandé in 2012.

Year	Nominee/work	Award	Result	Ref.
2012	Emeli Sandé	Musician of the Year	Won	

== Ivor Novello Awards ==
The Ivor Novello Awards, named after entertainer Ivor Novello, are awarded for songwriting and composing, presented annually in London by the British Academy of Songwriters, Composers and Authors (BASCA). Sandé has two wins from two nominations.

Year	Nominee/work	Award	Result	Ref.
2013	"Next to Me"	Best Song Musically and Lyrically	Won	
2013	"Next to Me"	Most performed Work	Won	

== MOBO Awards ==
The Music of Black Origin Awards (MOBO Awards) are held annually in the United Kingdom to recognise artists of any race or nationality who perform black music in genres ranging from Gospel to Jazz, R&B, Soul, Reggae, and Hip-Hop. Sandé has three wins from seven nominations.

Year	Nominee/work	Award	Result	Ref.
2011	Emeli Sandé	Best Newcomer	Nominated	
2012	Emeli Sandé	Best UK Female Act	Won	
2012	Emeli Sandé	Best R&B/Soul Act	Won	
2012	"My Kind of Love"	Best Video	Nominated	
2012	"Next to Me"	Best Song	Nominated	
2012	Our Version of Events	Best Album	Won	
2017	Emeli Sandé	Best Female Act	Nominated	

== MTV Europe Music Award ==
The MTV Europe Music Award is an award presented by Viacom International Media Networks to honour artists and music in pop culture. Sandé has one win from one nomination.

Year	Nominee/work	Award	Result	Ref.
2017	Emeli Sandé as part of the Artists for Grenfell initiative	Power of Music Award	Won	

== NARM Music Biz Awards ==
Sandé has one win from one nomination.

Year	Nominee/work	Award	Result	Ref.
2013	Emeli Sandé	Breakthrough Artist	Won	

== Pop Awards ==
The Pop Awards are presented annually by Pop Magazine, honoring the best in popular music. Sandé has received three nominations, more than any other artist so far.

Year	Nominee/work	Award	Result	Ref.
2020	Emeli Sandé	Artist Of The Year Award	Nominated	
2020	Real Life	Album Of The Year Award	Nominated	
2020	"You Are Not Alone"	Song Of The Year Award	Nominated	

== Q Awards ==
The Q Awards are the UK's annual music awards by music magazine Q, honouring musical excellence. Sandé has won the Q Award for Best Solo Artist in 2012.

Year	Nominee/work	Award	Result	Ref.
2012	Emeli Sandé	Best Solo Artist	Won	

== Scottish Fashion Awards ==
Sandé was nominated for Fashion Icon at the Scottish Fashion Awards in 2012.

Year	Nominee/work	Award	Result	Ref.
2012	Emeli Sandé	Fashion Icon	Nominated	

== Scottish Music Awards ==
The Scottish Music Awards are an annual award ceremony held in Scotland to commemorate outstanding musical contribution by musicians over the past year to Scottish music. Sandé won one award.

Year	Nominee/work	Award	Result	Ref.
2017	Herself	Song Writing Award	Won	

== Silver Clef Awards ==
The Silver Clef Awards are an annual music award in the UK. Sandé has one win from one nomination.

Year	Nominee/work	Award	Result	Ref.
2012	Emeli Sandé	Innovation Award	Won	

== Soul Train Music Awards ==
The Soul Train Music Awards are an annual award show produced by the makers of Soul Train. Sandé was nominated three times.

Year	Nominee/work	Award	Result	Ref.
2012	Emeli Sandé	Best New Artist	Nominated	
2012	Emeli Sandé	Best International Performance	Nominated	
2013	Emeli Sandé	Best International Performance	Nominated	

== Swiss Music Awards ==
The Swiss Music Awards are presented by the Press Play Association in conjunction with Media Control Switzerland to national and international artists. Sandé has one win from one nomination.

Year	Nominee/work	Award	Result	Ref.
2013	Emeli Sandé	Best Breaking Act International	Won	

== The Sun Bizarre Award ==
Sandé has one win from one nomination.

Year	Nominee/work	Award	Result	Ref.
2012	Emeli Sandé	Woman of the Year	Won	

== Teen Choice Awards ==
The Teen Choice Awards are an annual awards show, honoring the biggest achievements in music, film, sports, television, fashion, social media, and more. Sandé was nominated twice.

Year	Nominee/work	Award	Result	Ref.
2013	Emeli Sandé	Choice Music Breakout Artist	Nominated	
2013	"Next to Me"	Choice R&B/Hip-Hop Song	Nominated	

== Urban Music Awards ==
The Urban Music Awards are a British awards ceremony which recognises the achievement of urban-based artists, producers, nightclubs, DJs, radio stations, and record labels. Sandé has received eleven nominations and won twice.

Year	Nominee/work	Award	Result	Ref.
2011	Emeli Sandé	Best Female Artist	Nominated	
2011	Emeli Sandé	Best R&B Act	Won	
2011	Emeli Sandé	Best Newcomer	Won	
2011	"Heaven"	Best Single	Nominated	
2012	Emeli Sandé	Best UK Female	Nominated	
2012	Emeli Sandé	Best R&B Act	Nominated	
2012	Emeli Sandé	Artist of the Year	Nominated	
2012	"Wonder"	Best Video	Nominated	
2012	"Wonder"	Best Collaboration	Nominated	
2013	Emeli Sandé	Best Female Artist	Nominated	
2013	"Lifted"	Best Single	Nominated	

== Virgin Media Music Awards ==
Sandé was nominated twice.

Year	Nominee/work	Award	Result	Ref.
2011	Emeli Sandé	Best Newcomer	Nominated	
2011	"Read All About It"	Best Collaboration	Nominated	

== DIVA Awards ==
Year	Nominee/work	Award	Result	Ref.
2023	Emeli Sandé	Musician of the Year Award	Won	
