= Live at the Royal Albert Hall (Emeli Sandé album) =

Live album by Emeli Sandé
- Released: 18 February 2013
- Recorded: 11 November 2012
- Venue: Royal Albert Hall (London)
- Genre: R&B; soul; acoustic
- Length: 93:29
- Label: Virgin; EMI

Emeli Sandé chronology
Our Version of Events (2012)	Live at the Royal Albert Hall (2013)	Long Live the Angels (2016)

Live at the Royal Albert Hall is the debut live album by Scottish recording artist Emeli Sandé. The album was released on 18 February 2013. The set features the headline concert filmed at London's Royal Albert Hall on 11 November 2012. The set includes Sandé's hit singles, and songs from her number one selling debut album Our Version of Events. The set also includes a cover from one of Sandé's idols, Nina Simone, as well as two new songs, "Enough" and "Pluto". Professor Green made a brief appearance during "Read All About It, Pt. III" and Labrinth and Sandé performed "Beneath Your Beautiful" during the encore.

== Track listing ==
Disc 1 (CD)
No.	Title	Writer(s)	Producer(s)	Length
1.	"Daddy"	Sandé; Khan; Murray; Omer; Mitchell	Naughty Boy; Mojam Music*	4:35
2.	"Where I Sleep"	Sandé; Khan	Naughty Boy	3:40
3.	"Breaking the Law"	Sandé; Khan; Harrison	Naughty Boy; Jeremy Wheatley*	4:19
4.	"Enough"	Sandé; Lind; Bjorklund	Naughty Boy	3:47
5.	"My Kind of Love"	Sandé; Emile Haynie	Emile Haynie; Danny Keyz; Craze & Hoax^	5:18
6.	"Clown"	Sandé; Khan; Grant Mitchell	Naughty Boy	3:58
7.	"River"	Sandé; Khan	Naughty Boy	4:42
8.	"I Wish I Knew How It Would Feel to Be Free"	Billy Taylor; Dick Dallas	Naughty Boy	3:59
9.	"Suitcase"	Sandé; Khan; Ben Harrison; L.Juby	Naughty Boy; Harrison*; Mojam Music*	3:47
10.	"Read All About It, Pt. III" (featuring Professor Green)	Stephen Manderson; Iain James; Tom Barnes; Ben Kohn; Pete Kelleher; Emeli Sandé	Gavin Powell	6:38
11.	"Wonder"	Sandé; Khan; Chegwin; Craze	Naughty Boy	5:36
12.	"Mountains"	Sandé; Khan; James Murray; Mustafa Omer; Luke Juby	Mojam Music; Naughty Boy	5:42
13.	"Heaven"	Sandé; Khan; Craze; Chegwin; Mike Spencer	Mike Spencer	6:29
14.	"Beneath Your Beautiful" (featuring Labrinth)	Sandé; Timothy McKenzie; Mike Posner	Labrinth; Da Digglar	4:34
15.	"Maybe"	Sandé; Paul Herman; Ash Millard	Herman & Millard; Mojam Music*	3:57
16.	"Next to Me"	Sandé; Craze; Chegwin	Craze & Hoax; Mojam Music*	3:50

Disc 2 (DVD)
No.	Title	Writer(s)	Producer(s)	Length
1.	"Daddy"	Sandé; Khan; Murray; Omer; Mitchell	Naughty Boy; Mojam Music*	5:01
2.	"Tiger"	Sandé; Khan	Naughty Boy	4:13
3.	"Where I Sleep"	Sandé; Khan	Naughty Boy	4:47
4.	"Breaking the Law"	Sandé; Khan; Harrison	Naughty Boy; Jeremy Wheatley*	4:19
5.	"Enough"	Sandé; Lind; Bjorklund	Naughty Boy	4:06
6.	"Pluto" (featuring The Heroes)	Sandé; Khan; Craze; Chegwin; Spencer	Mike Spencer	4:12
7.	"My Kind of Love"	Sandé; Emile Haynie	Emile Haynie; Danny Keyz; Craze & Hoax^	7:06
8.	"Abide with Me"	Henry Francis Lyte; William Henry Monk	Naughty Boy	2:25
9.	"Clown"	Sandé; Khan; Grant Mitchell	Naughty Boy	5:07
10.	"River"	Sandé; Khan	Naughty Boy	6:36
11.	"I Wish I Knew How It Would Feel to Be Free"	Billy Taylor; Dick Dallas	Naughty Boy	3:47
12.	"Suitcase"	Sandé; Khan; Ben Harrison; L.Juby	Naughty Boy; Harrison*; Mojam Music*	4:01
13.	"Read All About It (Pt. III)" (featuring Professor Green)	Stephen Manderson; Iain James; Tom Barnes; Ben Kohn; Pete Kelleher; Emeli Sandé	Gavin Powell	7:38
14.	"Wonder"	Sandé; Khan; Chegwin; Craze	Naughty Boy	6:22
15.	"Mountains"	Sandé; Khan; James Murray; Mustafa Omer; Luke Juby	Mojam Music; Naughty Boy	5:39
16.	"Heaven"	Sandé; Khan; Craze; Chegwin; Mike Spencer	Mike Spencer	7:32
17.	"Beneath Your Beautiful" (featuring Labrinth)	Sandé; Timothy McKenzie; Mike Posner	Labrinth; Da Digglar	4:38
18.	"Maybe"	Sandé; Paul Herman; Ash Millard	Herman & Millard; Mojam Music*	4:18
19.	"Next to Me"	Sandé; Craze; Chegwin	Craze & Hoax; Mojam Music*	5:16

== Charts ==
=== Weekly charts ===
Chart (2013)	Peak; position
Belgium Albums (Ultratop Flanders)	7
Belgium Albums (Ultratop Wallonia)	17
Dutch Albums (MegaCharts)	24
French Albums (SNEP)	33
Irish Albums (IRMA)	9
Italian Albums (FIMI)	74
Swedish Albums (Sverigetopplistan)	54
UK Music Videos (OOC)	1
US Billboard 200	124
US Top R&B/Hip-Hop Albums (Billboard)	21

=== Year-end charts ===
Chart (2013)	Position
Belgian Albums (Ultratop Flanders)	70
Belgian Albums (Ultratop Wallonia)	171

== Certifications ==
Region	Certification	Certified units/sales
New Zealand (RMNZ)	Gold	7,500^{‡}
United Kingdom (BPI)	Gold	25,000^{*}
^{*} Sales figures based on certification alone.^{‡} Sales+streaming figures based on certification alone.

== Release history ==
List of release dates showing countries, formats and record labels
Country	Release date	Edition	Record Label(s)
United Kingdom	18 February 2013	CD + DVD; digital download	Virgin; EMI Records
