= List of best-selling singles and albums of 2012 in Ireland =

This is a list of the best selling singles, albums and as according to IRMA. Further listings can be found here.

== Top-selling singles ==
1. "Impossible" – James Arthur
2. "Somebody That I Used to Know" – Gotye featuring Kimbra
3. "We Are Young" – fun. featuring Janelle Monáe
4. "Tiny Dancer - A Song for Lily-Mae" – Various Artists
5. "Call Me Maybe" – Carly Rae Jepsen
6. "Starships" – Nicki Minaj
7. "Titanium" – David Guetta featuring Sia
8. "Beneath Your Beautiful" – Labrinth featuring Emeli Sandé
9. "Wild Ones" – Flo Rida featuring Sia
10. "Next to Me" – Emeli Sandé

== Top-selling albums* ==
1. Take Me Home – One Direction
2. + – Ed Sheeran
3. Our Version of Events – Emeli Sandé
4. Born to Die – Lana Del Rey
5. 21 – Adele
6. Up All Night – One Direction
7. Unapologetic – Rihanna
8. Babel – Mumford & Sons
9. Christmas – Michael Bublé
10. 3 – The Script

Notes:

- *Compilation albums are not included.
