= Read All About It =

Read All About It may refer to:

== Books ==
- Read All About It!: Great Read-Aloud Stories, Poems, and Newspaper Pieces for Preteens and Teens, a 1993 book by Jim Trelease

== Film and TV ==
- Read All About It!, a 1979-1980 Canadian educational television series
- Read All About It, a 1945 film featuring Derek Gorst
- Read All About It, a 1974-1979 BBC books programme
- "Read All About It", an episode of the Canadian-American children's television series Caillou.

== Music ==
- Read All About It, a 1988 album by Newsboys
- "Read All About It" (song), a 2011 song by Professor Green featuring Emeli Sandé
  - "Read All About It, Pt. II", a 2012 continuation of Green's song featuring Fink
  - "Read All About It, Pt. III", a 2012 continuation of Green's song by Emeli Sandé
- "Read All About It", a song by The Flirtations
- "Read All About It", a song by Raven from Wiped Out

== See also ==
- Extra Texture (Read All About It), a 1975 album by George Harrison
- "Extra Extra (Read All About It)", a song Ralph Carter from When You're Young and in Love
