= Daddy (Emeli Sandé song) =

Single by Emeli Sandé featuring Naughty Boy

from the album Our Version of Events
- Released: 27 November 2011
- Length: 3:08
- Label: Virgin
- Songwriter(s): Emeli Sandé; Shahid Khan; James Murray; Mustafa Omer; Grant Mitchell
- Producer(s): Naughty Boy; Mojam

Emeli Sandé singles chronology
| "Read All About It" (2011) | "Daddy" (2011) | "Next to Me" (2012) |

Naughty Boy singles chronology
| "F**kery (Out of Order)" (2011) | "Daddy" (2011) | "Wonder" (2012) |

"Daddy" is a song by British singer Emeli Sandé, featuring British record producer Naughty Boy. It was released on 27 November 2011 as the second single from her debut studio album, Our Version of Events, which was released on 13 February 2012. In early January 2012, it was made iTunes' song of the week.

== Music video ==
A music video to accompany the release of "Daddy" was first released onto YouTube on 21 October 2011 at a total length of three minutes and twenty seconds. The video features Sandé singing, whilst burglars, in which one of them is the person Sandé is singing about, raid a supermarket, and one of them takes the money from the cash machine. In the end, Sandé is in the supermarket, whilst a burglar approaches her. He then takes off his mask. In the end, the burglar finds a folded piece of paper in his fridge.

== Critical reception ==
Lewis Corner of Digital Spy gave the song a very positive review, stating: "My friends keep telling you what he did last night, how many girls he kissed, how many he liked," she insists over haunting church bell chimes as she gives her bezzie a reality check on love; before a mish-mash of thrashing acoustics pound out with more drama than the EastEnders cliffhanger outro. By the time the catchy-as-cholera chorus kicks in, it's obvious that 2012 is Sande's for the taking. At least Cowell's got one thing right this year, eh?

== Track listing ==
- Digital remix single
1. "Daddy" – 3:08
2. "Daddy" (Fred V & Grafix remix) – 4:29
3. "Daddy" (Disclosure remix) – 4:08
4. "Daddy" (Third Party remix) – 6:21
5. "Daddy" (Cyantific remix) – 5:40
6. "Daddy" (Ifan Dafydd remix) – 4:59

== Chart performance ==
| Chart (2011) | Peak position |
|---|---|
| Belgium (Ultratip Flanders) | 12 |
| Belgium (Ultratop Flanders Dance) | 14 |
| Belgium (Ultratip Wallonia) | 8 |
| Belgium (Ultratop Wallonia Dance) | 23 |
| Finland (Suomen virallinen lista) | 5 |
| Scotland (OCC) | 20 |
| UK Singles (OCC) | 21 |
| UK Hip Hop/R&B (OCC) | 6 |
| US Hot Dance Club Songs (Billboard) | 47 |

== Release history ==
| Country | Release date | Format(s) |
|---|---|---|
| United Kingdom | 27 November 2011 | CD; digital download |
