= Our Version of Events =

Studio album by Emeli Sandé
- Released: 13 February 2012
- Recorded: 2010–2011
- Studios: The Lark's Studios (Buckinghamshire, England); Angel Recording Studios (London, England); Cabana Studios (West London, England); Mojam Studios One (London, England); Air-Edel Studios (London, England); Craze & Hoax Studios (West London, England); Strongroom Studios (Shoreditch, England); G2 Studios (London, England); Jungle City Studios (New York, NY); The Pool (London, England); Chris Loco Productions (London, England); Milmark Studios (London, England)
- Genres: R&B; soul; pop
- Length: 48:56
- Labels: Virgin; EMI
- Producers: Naughty Boy; Craze & Hoax; Mike Spencer; Emile Haynie; Danny Keyz; Paul Herman; Ash Millard; Mojam Music; Alicia Keys; Gavin Powell

Emeli Sandé chronology
Our Version of Events (2012)	Live at the Royal Albert Hall (2013)

Singles from Our Version of Events
- 1. "Heaven" Released: 12 August 2011; 2. "Daddy" Released: 27 November 2011; 3. "Next to Me" Released: 10 February 2012; 4. "My Kind of Love" Released: 8 June 2012; 5. "Clown" Released: 3 February 2013

Our Version of Events is the debut studio album by Scottish singer Emeli Sandé. It was released on 13 February 2012 by Virgin Records, following Sandé's winning of the Critics' Choice Award at the BRIT Awards 2012. Though Our Version of Events is her first album release, Sandé has been active in the industry since 2009, most notably appearing on singles by Chipmunk ("Diamond Rings") and Wiley ("Never Be Your Woman"). The album features R&B, soul and pop music.

Sandé began working with Alicia Keys for the album, and for Keys' upcoming album. She also expressed interest in working with Nicki Minaj on the album. Naughty Boy was a major collaboration with Sandé from the day she began creating music professionally. She wrote every track on the album, saying that the key to a good song when writing is using "honesty" and "raw emotion". Upon release of the album, Sandé's vocal ability was compared to the likes of Aretha Franklin, Whitney Houston, Beyoncé, Annie Lennox, Tracy Chapman, Nina Simone, Joni Mitchell and Lauryn Hill. Madonna also expressed interest in Sandé's music.

"Heaven" was released in August 2011 as the first single from the album, charting at number two on the UK Singles Chart and later became an international success, charting within the top ten in many European countries. Sandé released "Read All About It" with Professor Green in November 2011, which resulted in her writing "Read All About It, Pt. III". "Daddy" was released in November 2011, charting at number 21 in the UK and also becoming an international success. "Easier in Bed", a non-album promotional single was released onto iTunes in December 2011. "Next to Me" was the third single released, and became a global hit, reaching number two in the UK and number two and number one on the Irish Singles Chart. "My Kind of Love" was released as the fourth single from the album in June 2012, with Sandé appearing on The Voice UK to promote the single.

Upon release, Our Version of Events debuted at number one on the UK Albums Chart and remained at the top spot for five non-consecutive weeks. The British Phonographic Industry certified the album 2× Platinum, making it the fastest selling album by a British recording artist since Susan Boyle's I Dreamed a Dream (2009). It was later certified 8× Platinum. The album also peaked at number one on the Irish Albums Chart. It won British Album of the Year at the 2013 Brit Awards.

Our Version of Events was re-released on 22 October 2012. It included three new tracks, a remix and a cover of "Imagine" (originally by John Lennon), replacing Sandé's version of "Abide with Me". "Wonder" (a song credited as Naughty Boy featuring Emeli Sandé featured on the US version of the album) was released as the lead single from the re-release. It also serves as the lead single from collaborator Naughty Boy's album Hotel Cabana. In September 2012, Our Version of Events became the best-selling album of 2012 in the UK, overtaking Adele's 21. It was also the second best-selling album of 2013 in the UK.

== Background ==
Sandé first appeared in public when she sent a video into Trevor Nelson's BBC urban music competition, where she played piano while singing one of her favourite songs, "Nasty Little Man". It was later announced that she had won the competition and Sandé was offered a record deal. However, once she met the management to finalise the contract for the recording contract, the management decided against giving Sandé a deal. Her parents later sent BBC Radio 1Xtra a CD of her songs and Ras Kwame played the songs on his "Homegrown Sessions", and four artists that year were asked to do a show in Soho in the United States. She later met Shahid Khan, who has previously worked with Ms Dynamite and Bashy. Khan said "When we started together it took the music to something completely original. It took me out of my jazz piano niche, and it took him out of his urban scene. Then we started writing for pop people."

Sandé began by writing tracks for artists such as Alesha Dixon, Chipmunk, Professor Green, Devlin, Preeya Kalidas, Cheryl Cole, and Tinie Tempah. While trying to get into the music industry she was studying medicine at the University of Glasgow, but she decided to stop in her fourth year. Sandé always said that her education was the most important thing to her, stating if her music career was to fail, she would have her education to fall back on. Sandé said that her manager, Adrian Sykes, waited patiently since she was 16, saying "Adrian really respects that I want to get an education behind me. He also knows my parents are keen that I finish university." Sandé first performed publicly when she provided guest vocals on Chipmunk's hit single, "Diamond Rings" which she also wrote in 2009. A year later she returned again to the public's attention when she teamed up with Wiley on his comeback single, "Never Be Your Woman", the song became Sandé second top-ten single on the UK Singles Chart. It was later announced that "Never Be Your Woman" was a trail for Sandé with EMI Records to see how well the song charted, with the success the song had, Sandé later signed a record deal with Virgin Records.

== Development ==
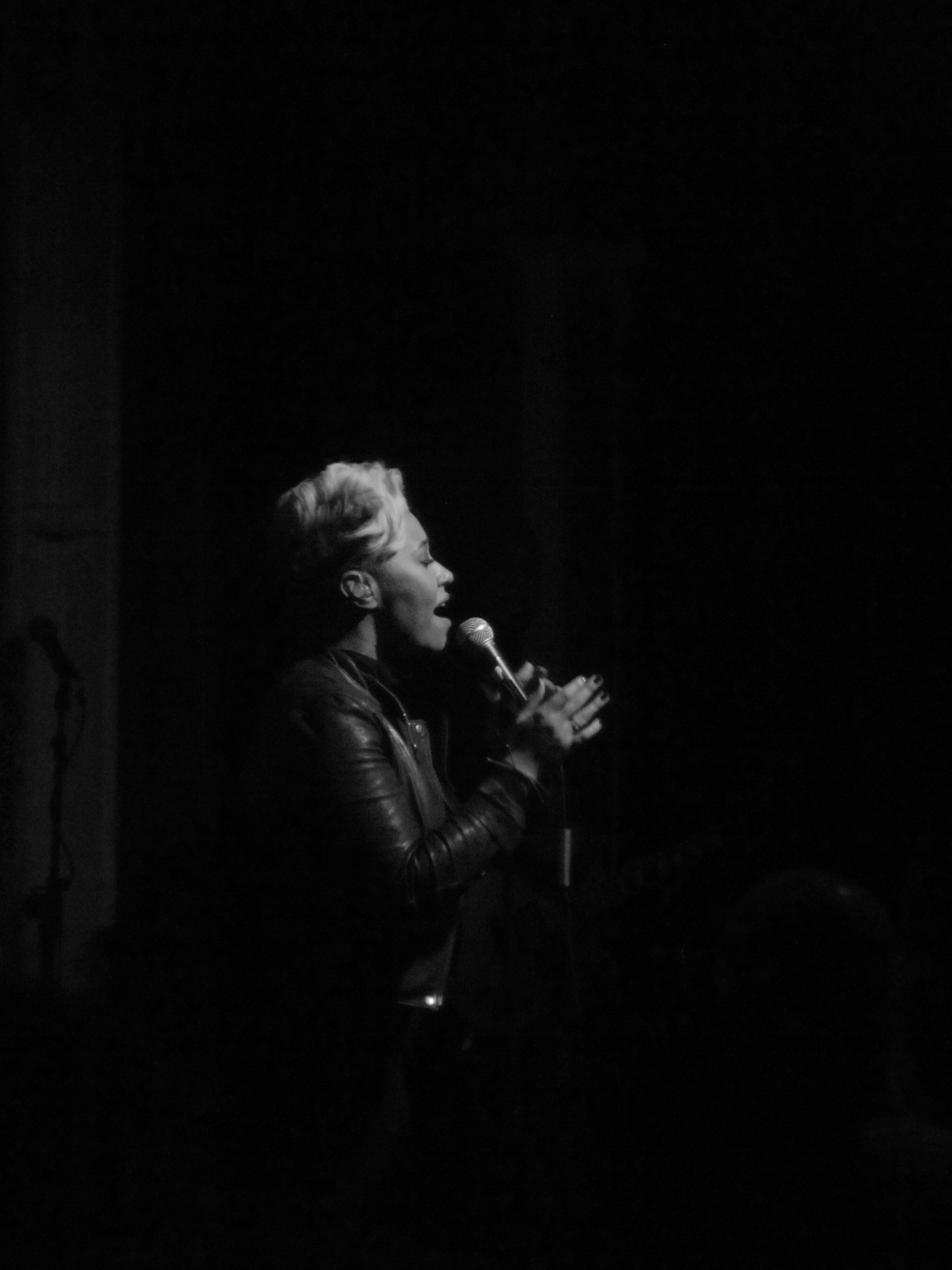
Sandé at XOYO

Sandé took her middle name Emeli on professionally two years before she hit the limelight as Adele had just risen to prominence. "I changed it as soon as Adele came out. I just thought, 'You've kind of taken the [name] now', so I went with my middle name. She was just getting bigger and bigger, so I thought I just really need it."

Sandé said that once she won the Critics' Choice Award at the BRIT Awards she said she was more excited for her album to come out and that her confidence has grown, as her album was not out at time of the awards, but she said no matter how happy she was with the record there will always be doubts lurking somewhere. "I'd spent so long behind the scenes writing for other people and featuring on other people's records so it just felt so good to get the acknowledgement for me as an artist in my own right." She spoke on the relief she had once she had signed a record deal with Virgin Records in 2010 as she spoke it was a "long journey to get signed" as she said "once you get established as a songwriter it's quite hard to get people to recognise you as an artist in your own right. It felt like a long battle to get people to see me and believe in my music. Lots of Record labels didn't want to sign me. So it was great to prove people wrong in that sense."

Tracy Chapman was later added to the name of people she wanted to work with. Beyoncé and Stevie Wonder both said they wanted to work with Sandé. She said that while they assume that she is currently busy, knowing Wonder would like to work with her was a dream come true. She said she would continue to collaborate with Alicia Keys on her upcoming album, and she would be flattered to work with Beyoncé as her voice is unparalleled. Nicki Minaj was also someone who she would like to collaborate with on the album, but did not get the chance. Her vocal ability is often compared to Whitney Houston, Aretha Franklin, Beyoncé, Alicia Keys, Christina Aguilera and Annie Lennox.

== Recording ==
Sandé said, as much as she would like, she would never play the piano as well as Simone, but she would give it her best shot. She loves the songs Simone produced, including "I Wish I Knew How It Would Feel to Be Free" and Simone's version of "I Think It's Going to Rain Today". She said that Simone's original songs are very poetic and she said "So when I listen to commercial stuff at the moment, I'm just thinking 'haven't you heard Nina Simone, haven't you heard how a song should be written?"

Sandé began working in the studio with Naughty Boy in 2009, where the pair first worked together on Chipmunk's debut album I Am Chipmunk. She said that she wanted the songs on her debut album to be fresh and she wanted to try and take it back how she wrote songs at the beginning of her career. Sandé had classical music training as a songwriter in her teens and learnt to play the piano at an early age, and getting across that she played, made and wrote her own music was very important to her. She said on the album, she wanted people to see every side of her as an artist, so it was important to have songs there where there could be a real connection with the lyric, rather than there just be throwaway pop music. Joni Mitchell and Lauryn Hill were also major influences for the album.

She began working with Professor Green on the album. The pair had previously worked together on the rapper's albums Alive Till I'm Dead in 2010 on the track "Kids That Love to Dance" and At Your Inconvenience in 2011, on the track "Read All About It". This became Sandé's and Professor Green's first number-one single on the UK Singles Chart. The singer pointed out that she has set the song out like a story of her life. She said that the album is very different from the first two singles which she released from the album "Heaven" and "Daddy" and "Read All About It" with Professor Green and that fans should expect something a little different. Sandé also met Madonna after they were both guests on The Graham Norton Show, and Madonna expressed interest in working with Sandé in the future. Madonna also spoke about her love for her track "Next to Me".

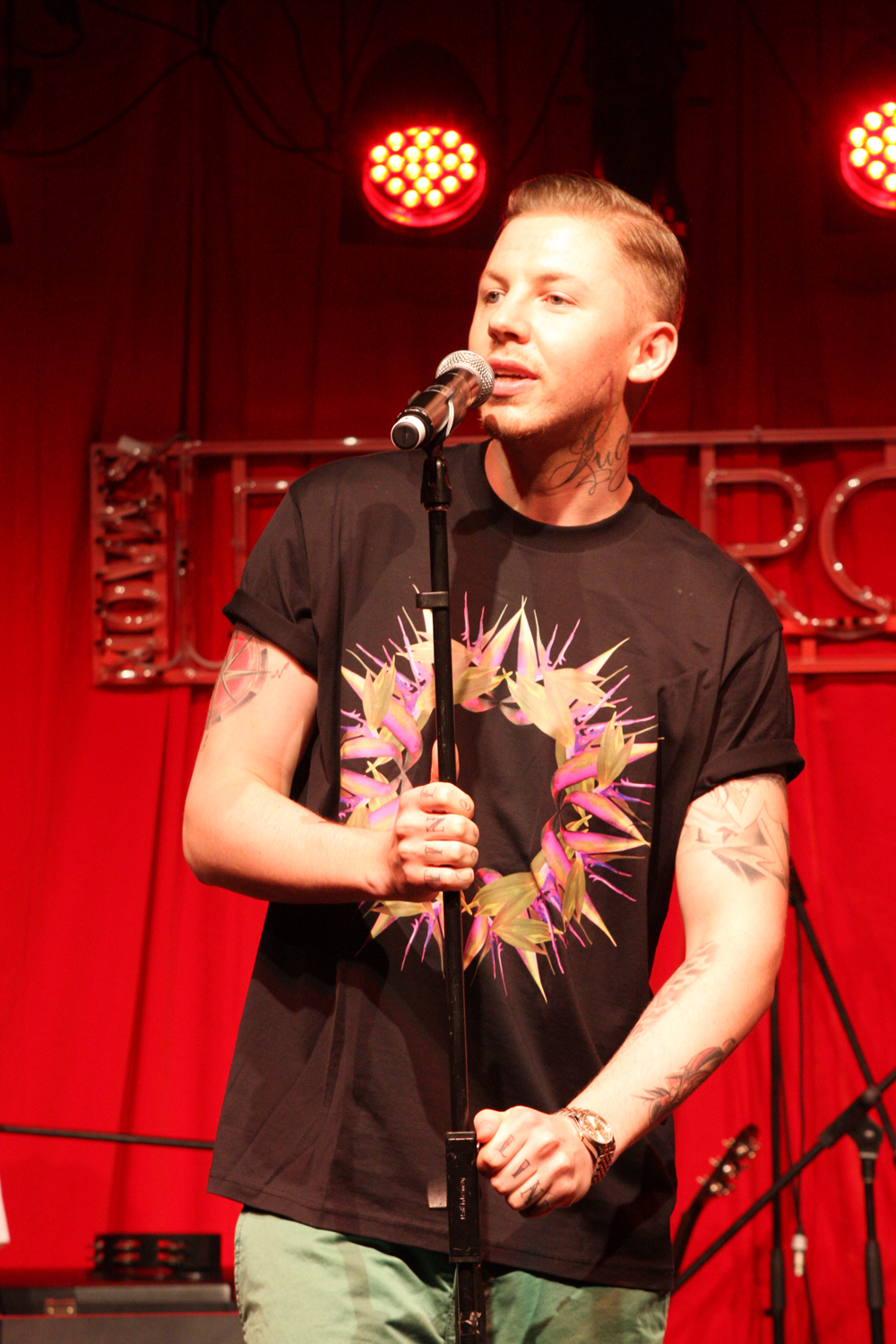
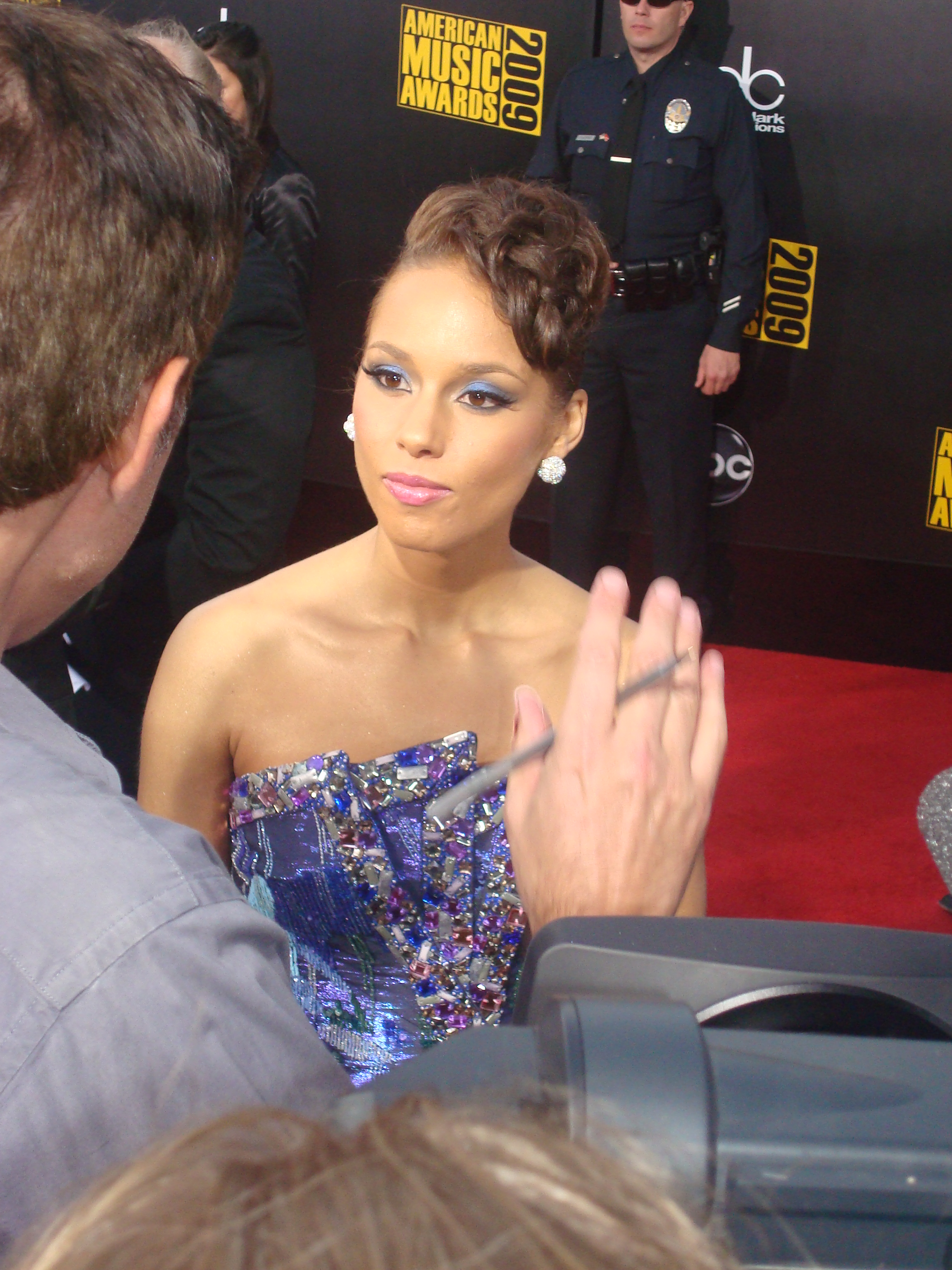
Professor Green (left) and Alicia Keys (right) are two of the artists who wrote with Sandé on her debut album.

She said that there will be moments on the album that are a lot more intimate and a lot more stripped back to other tracks on the album, but these tracks show and stand out. Sandé said people didn't know what do with her, it was just her and her piano, which was very stripped, it was completely different from what everyone was used to and different from everything that was currently out. However, she stressed that it is good to be different and not predictable.

Ed Sheeran has spoken about his support her Sandé and her music, saying that she has spent a lot of time on the record and that it could be as big as Adele's second album, 21, which has sold over 27 million records worldwide. Sandé revealed that she wanted to bring poetry back into music, as it has been lost. The songs which are currently being released are for the "moment" as they make us feel good and we can dance to them, Sandé said. She said that Our Version of Events will see poetry lyrics, as she intends to bring them back into fashion. She said; Great songwriters come along quite rarely, but when I listen to Tracy Chapman or Joni Mitchell, these are people who pay attention to the lyric and are precise about it. I feel that has been put second to having a cool producer or whether the kids will like it. She said that the music industry is hard to get into, but once you are in, it is very loyal. In the recording studio, Syco Music heard some of Sandé's songs which they wanted, but she refused and told them she wanted to keep them for her own album. They later asked her to write for some of their artists, and Leona Lewis went into the studio with her and Naughty Boy to record for a couple of weeks, and she said that her and Lewis had a lot in common. She also said that Lewis has a phenomenal voice and she was lovely.

"Boys" which was Cheryl Cole's B-side track to "3 Words" was originally for Sandé's album. However, she said when she heard Cole sing it, she loved how what the lyrics meant to Cole was different from what they meant to her when she wrote it, so Sandé decided to give the track to Cole.

== Musical style ==
"Because I left medicine, it was important for me that this wasn't going to be a half-assed job. I was always going to try to be the best and make this happen. The fact I'd given up the chance to be a doctor was driving me. It was an incentive to do better than that lifestyle. When I left medicine, I knew I wasn't going to muck around. I planned to write for as many people as possible and develop as much as I could for myself and others."

— Emeli Sandé on writing songs after giving the chance up to become a doctor

Sandé said the key to a successful song was simplicity. The singer pointed out that she could never have used songs which she wrote when she was 17 because she made the songs too complicated; saying there were too many words and parts to the track. She stated that the key feature to a classical song was keeping the "melody simple" and having big "lyric effective", which was much easier said than actually done. Sandé said that another important key to a good song when songwriting is using "honesty" and "raw emotion" as the best way to write. She said that if she attempts to write something which is "too smart" the creative process will not work for her. "Kill the Boy" was one of the first ideas that came to Sandé's head. If she has to work on a song longer than a day, she will not go back to it because it won't work. She went on to say if it was to work, the idea for the song would be almost instant. Sandé said that all her songs are about world peace and political issues. She is the same person since gaining the record deal with Virgin Records, and they are the same songs which she planned for the album before gaining the deal. She said that a lot of people didn't see the potential in the songs or in her, but once she gained the record deal, she gained more confidence. "When you get knocked back so much you kind of learn to believe in yourself, stand up for yourself, because you can bet that nobody else is going to do it."

== Songs and lyrics ==
Sandé said that the first track on the album, "Heaven" was a huge "epic pop song" which had sweeping strings. It came about when she was having a late night conversation with Naughty Boy, the song's producer with whom she worked throughout the whole album. She said that Naughty Boy had a beat running in the background, and then she got the first line of the song and the song began to write itself from there. She said; "I love how songs like that develop: before we knew it, we were putting strings on with a synth, Naughty Boy suggested the Funky Drummer loop and it came together really organically." The song was heavily compared to Massive Attack's "Unfinished Sympathy"; however, Sandé said that she takes it as a compliment as she is a big fan of Massive Attack. However, she said lyrically or melodically the songs are not similar, but the Funky Drummer loop has been used so much and it has strings on people and that is why the connection is made between the two songs. She said she was glad if people get the same vibe from the song, as she loves the song and said the song was "really exciting". Sandé said she also "designed" the song for a night club moment, where everyone can put their hands in the air. The song's genre featured a dubstep pop. Sandé said that the song was based on the fact that she believes in God and heaven, although she does not follow a religion. She said that what inspired her the most to write the track was her idea of heaven, which was being surrounded by music and somewhere which is very calm, and she wrote about that in "Heaven".

"My Kind of Love" is the second track on the album, which shows Sandé's soulful and powerful vocals and is the first of many power ballad inspired moments and it is said that it one of the moments when Sandé's strength shines through. "My Kind of Love" was also the last track which Sandé had written for the album, and she wrote the song in her kitchen. The song is about her fiancé, Adam's unconditional love for her, and she said that he supported her whatever she wanted to do, be a musician or a doctor.

"Where I Sleep" is the third track from the album, and Sandé said she wanted to keep the track "open" and let people connect to the song in their own way, as she pointed out that the song does not necessarily have to be romantic. The singer said she didn't intend to make any of her tracks romantic, though you can apply the tracks to romance and love. She said the song means; "this is it, when I am with you I could be anywhere and I feel at home".

"Mountains" is a gentle, acoustic, and heartfelt track. It is also one of the first tracks she and Naughty Boy (the producer of the song) wrote three years before the album was released. The song is about Sandé's parents and their journey in life. Her father taught her that every generation should try to improve on where the last one came from. In 1980, her father and her mother got together in Sunderland, Tyne and Wear where Sandé was born. She wanted the track to have a "grand feeling" while describing a very ordinary situation. "Clown" has been compared to the music of Adele and her track "Rolling in the Deep".

"Daddy" is the second single released from the album. It was the first song that she and Naughty Boy had worked together on and she pointed out that the song has nothing to do with her father. It has the sound of an early 1990s dance hit, and the song has been compared to the music by Seal and Adamski. The track is about her struggle while trying to get into the music industry and how people can get fanatical about money, drugs, fame or religion. "Daddy" also represents how that one thing you can keep returning to, like how drug addiction in the music industry and how easy it is to turn to. However, at the same time as she wrote the song she was thinking about The Jeremy Kyle Show, and the fact that people laugh at the people on that show, and that they are desperate enough to go on the show and talk about their problems. She also said that the song was written very quickly in two or three hours.

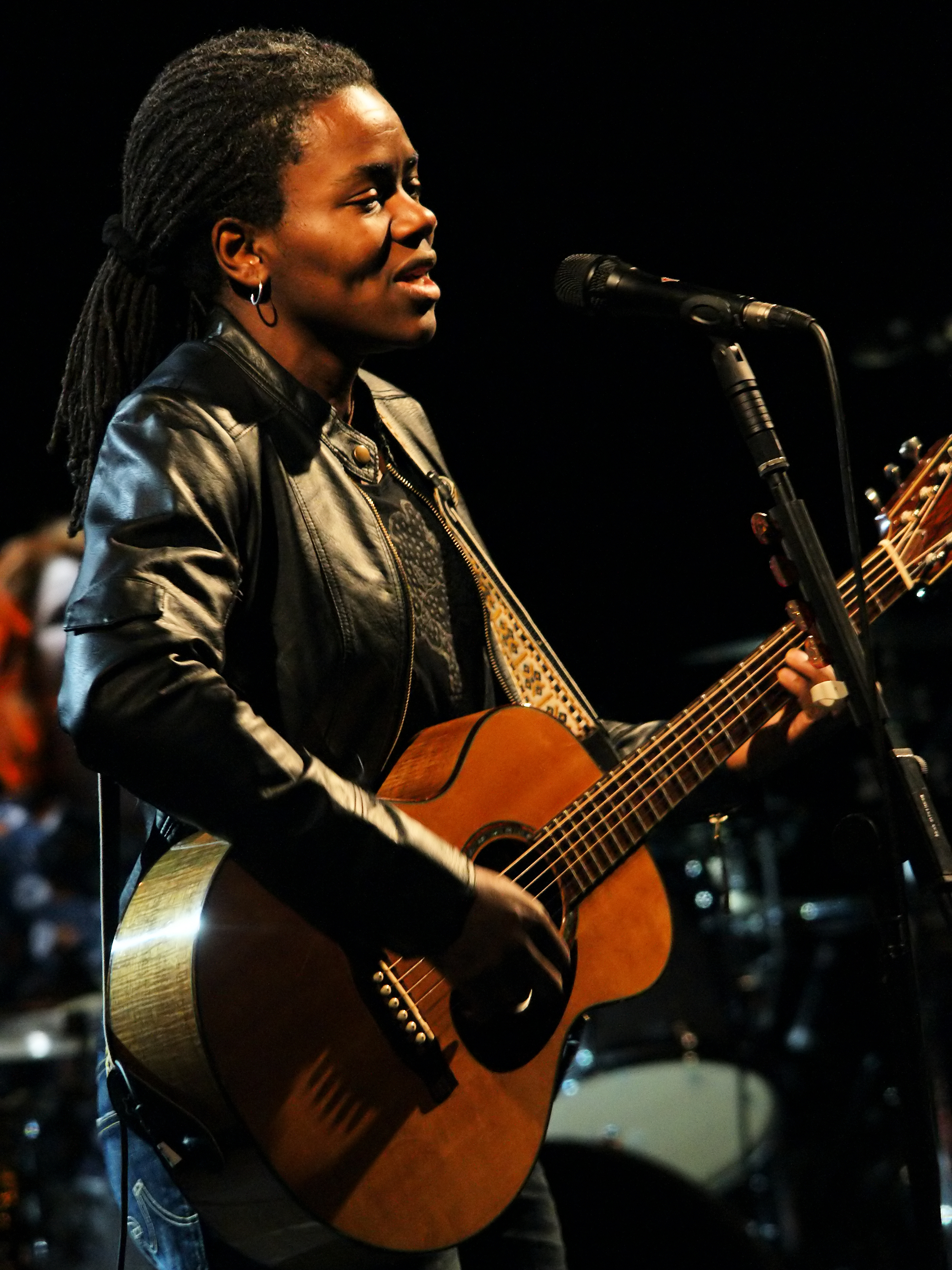
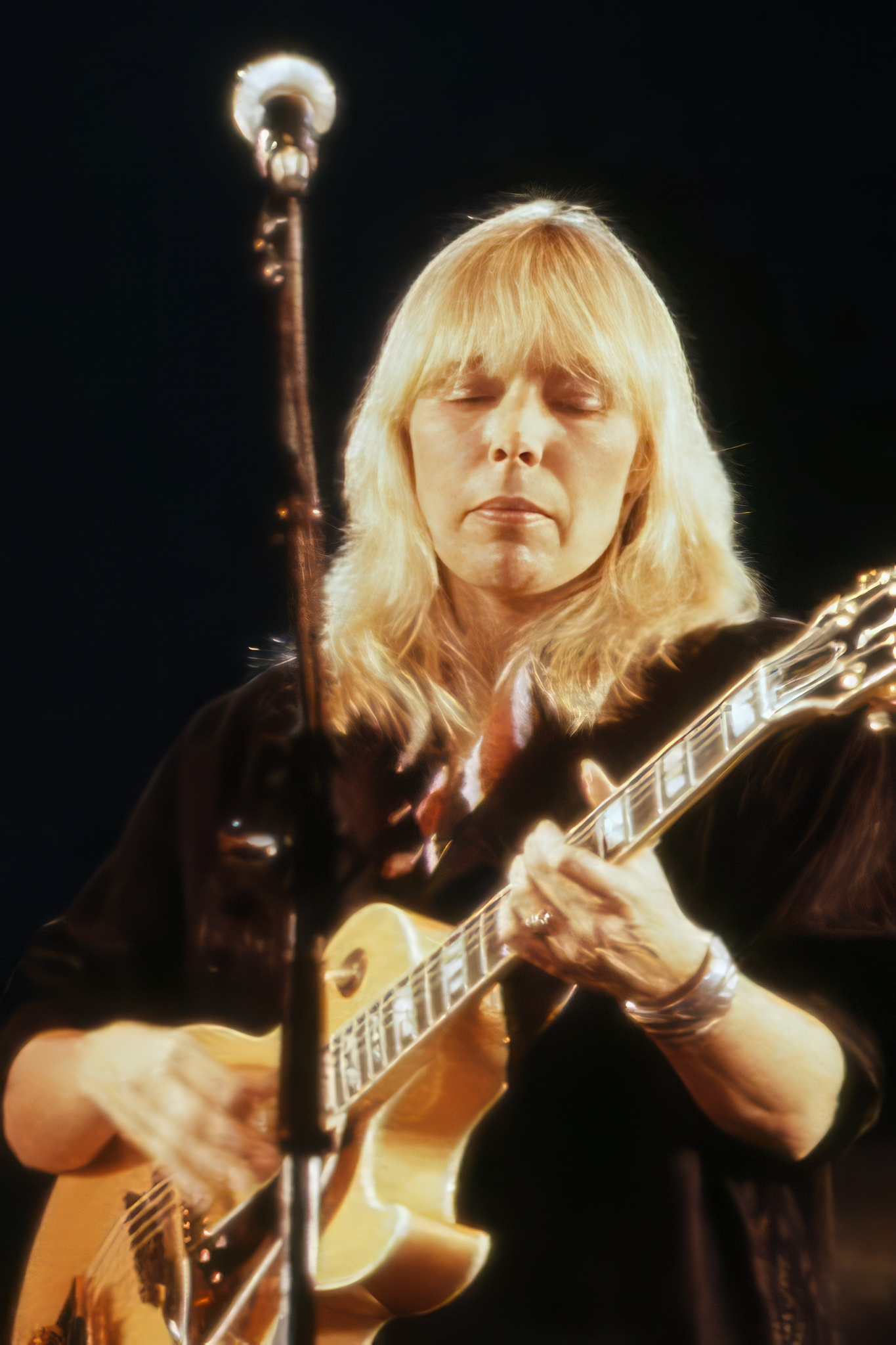
Tracy Chapman (left) and Joni Mitchell (right), two artists who had a big influence on Sandé's music.

"Maybe" is the album's seventh song, which was also written three years before the album was released and before she met all the people who worked on the album with her and herself and Paul Herman, who has previously worked with Dido and Jessie J wrote the track. The song is about confusion, and the fact that you don't know for sure when you break up with someone in a relationship if this person was not the love of your life and there is a question whether you have made the right decision.

"Suitcase" is the eighth song on the album. She was singing the line "he's got a blue face" and Sandé thought it sounded like the word "suitcase". Then at that moment, a whole story came out, and said at that moment she was trying to express how she was feeling, subconsciously almost. About a month ago (when the song was written) she and her fiancé had a falling out and it was a very hard time for her. She just wrote how she felt about that.

The ninth track on the album, "Breaking the Law" was written for her sister, to whom she is very close. She is one of the only individuals she would do anything for, Sandé said. And at the same time, she had just graduated in law and had always played her songs to her sister first.

Track number ten, "Next to Me", is the third single released from the album. Sandé wanted the old soulful feel to the track. The song is about the love and loyalty about "good men", meaning that the song could be about your partner or about your god.

"River", the eleventh song on the album, was written when she was sitting down alone at the piano and the lines just came, although she does not know where they came from. She said; "It's about the strong quiet type. I find that the louder people are, the less they have to say." "Lifetime" the third last track on the album is about the fact that Sandé can never find a link between science and music. "When I studied medicine, my brain was in a whole other gear. This is about how nothing really lasts forever, but in my life, the music and ideas I have will last."

"Hope" is the thirteenth track on the album and was written with Alicia Keys. Sandé said she was very nervous to be meeting and writing with her, but she went on to say that Keys was a very warm hearted person who knew how to make people feel at ease. The pair sat and played the piano, which for Sandé is a really "rare thing" to do with another singer. They have kept in touch and Sandé wrote for Keys' Girl on Fire.

"Read All About It, Pt. III" is the last track on the album. It came after the original version with Professor Green. She said that after she and Professor Green had done so many shows together, she heard and saw how personal the song was for him. It started to make her think, "what does the song mean to me, and what's my interpretation of it?" which is why she wrote it.

== Release and reissue ==
Sandé's debut album was released on 13 February 2012. She said that it is very hard to imagine that she is releasing an album with Virgin Records. She said that she was always going to "definitely" release an album, if she was signed or not. However, she stated that she did not think there would be "this much anticipation, or acknowledgement of what I was doing". She said she loves to be in the limelight and that people are talking about her so much. She said she only loves the attention because she has experienced the other side, when no one cares.

She said that the title of the album came about when one morning while she was having breakfast with Naughty Boy, one of the producers of the album, and her Artistic Adviser and said "I think I have the perfect title" as they were having a conversation about politics. The album title was announced by Sandé through her official Twitter account. The title was also mentioned on "Read All About It (Pt. III), which she wrote after she decided upon a title, she wrote the song with producer, Naughty Boy and Professor Green.

In August 2012, it was announced that Sandé would be re-releasing Our Version of Events with several brand new tracks. The collection was preceded by the release of two singles where Sandé is credited as the featured artist. Firstly on 21 October, Naughty Boy released "Wonder" which features Sandé on lead vocals. "Wonder" is the first single from Naughty Boy's debut album Hotel Cabana. Another single, "Beneath Your Beautiful" which is a duet between Labrinth and Sandé, was released as Labrinth's sixth single from his debut album Electronic Earth on 18 October 2012 and became his first solo number-one and Sandé's second featured number-one single after it rose to the top of the UK Singles Chart, following its success "Beneath Your Beautiful" replaced Sandé's cover of "Abide with Me" on the repackage.

== Singles ==
"Heaven is getting on all the playlists and I'm really happy. It is on the A-list at Radio 1, which is amazing. Heaven has also topped the Shazam chart, which is based on millions of daily requests for the names of songs played on the radio and in bars and clubs."

— Emeli Sandé speaking to the Daily Record over her elation at the response to "Heaven".

The first single to be released from Our Version of Events is the Mike Spencer-produced "Heaven", a ballad with house beats, mellow strings and a horns section that resembled productions by DJ Mark Ronson. The single garnered early airplay on BBC Radio 1's playlists, with daytime DJ Fearne Cotton crowning the song her "record of the week" in the second week of July 2011. "Heaven" was released on 12 August 2011, accompanied by a number of live performance recordings as its b-sides, in addition to a remixes EP which was released simultaneously with the single. Upon release, "Heaven" debuted on the UK Dance Singles Chart at number one and number two on the main singles chart. It also reached top-ten in Scotland, Denmark, and Italy.

"Daddy" was released as the album's second single on 27 November 2011, a month after Sandé's featured on UK Grime artist Professor Green's number one single "Read All About It" It is credited as featuring Naughty Boy (songwriter and producer Shahid Khan), who also produced the song and the majority of Sandé's album. "Daddy" is built around "haunting church bell chimes" with a mainly acoustic melody. "Daddy" peaked at number five in Finland, number twenty in Scotland and number twenty-one in the UK proving slightly less successful than "Heaven". It did however break the top-ten of the UK R&B Chart, managing to reach number six. Soon after, it was announced that critics had named Sandé the Critics Choice for the 2012 BRIT Awards.

Sandé's Critics Choice Award was followed with the release of the album's third single, "Next to Me", produced by Harry "Craze" & Hugo "Hoax" Chegwin and Mojam Music. The single is built around "head-nodding beats" and "gospel choir" harmonies in the chorus. "Next to Me" was released digitally on 12 February 2012 and unlike previous singles, the song was not packaged with any remixes or B-sides. Despite this, "Next to Me" would go on to become the most successful release from the album. It was the first to receive major recognition in the United States, where it was played on the Adult R&B radio format and reached number thirty-four on the Hot Adult R&B Songs chart, and charted at number 25 on the Billboard Hot 100 "Next to Me" became Sandé's first number-one as a solo artist, reach the top of the charts in Ireland and Scotland. In the UK, it narrowly missed out to DJ Fresh and Rita Ora's dubstep collaboration "Hot Right Now", as well as reaching top-ten in Belgium, Finland and New Zealand.

On 10 June 2012, almost a year since "Heaven" debuted, Sandé released the fourth single "My Kind of Love" as part of a remix EP. The gospel-tinged "My Kind of Love" is another Craze & Hoax production, this time aided by Danny Keyz and Emile Haynie. Sandé performed the song live during the first series of The Voice UK ahead of its release. "My Kind of Love" peaked at number seventeen on the UK singles chart, top-thirty in Scotland, and top-forty in Belgium and Ireland.

"Clown" was released as the fifth single from the album. Sandé performed the ballad live on The X Factor final in Manchester. It was included on the original release of the album, and the re-issue. An acoustic version of "Easier in Bed" was released as a promotional single in December 2011. "Read All About It, Pt. III" was released as a single in some countries.

== Tour ==
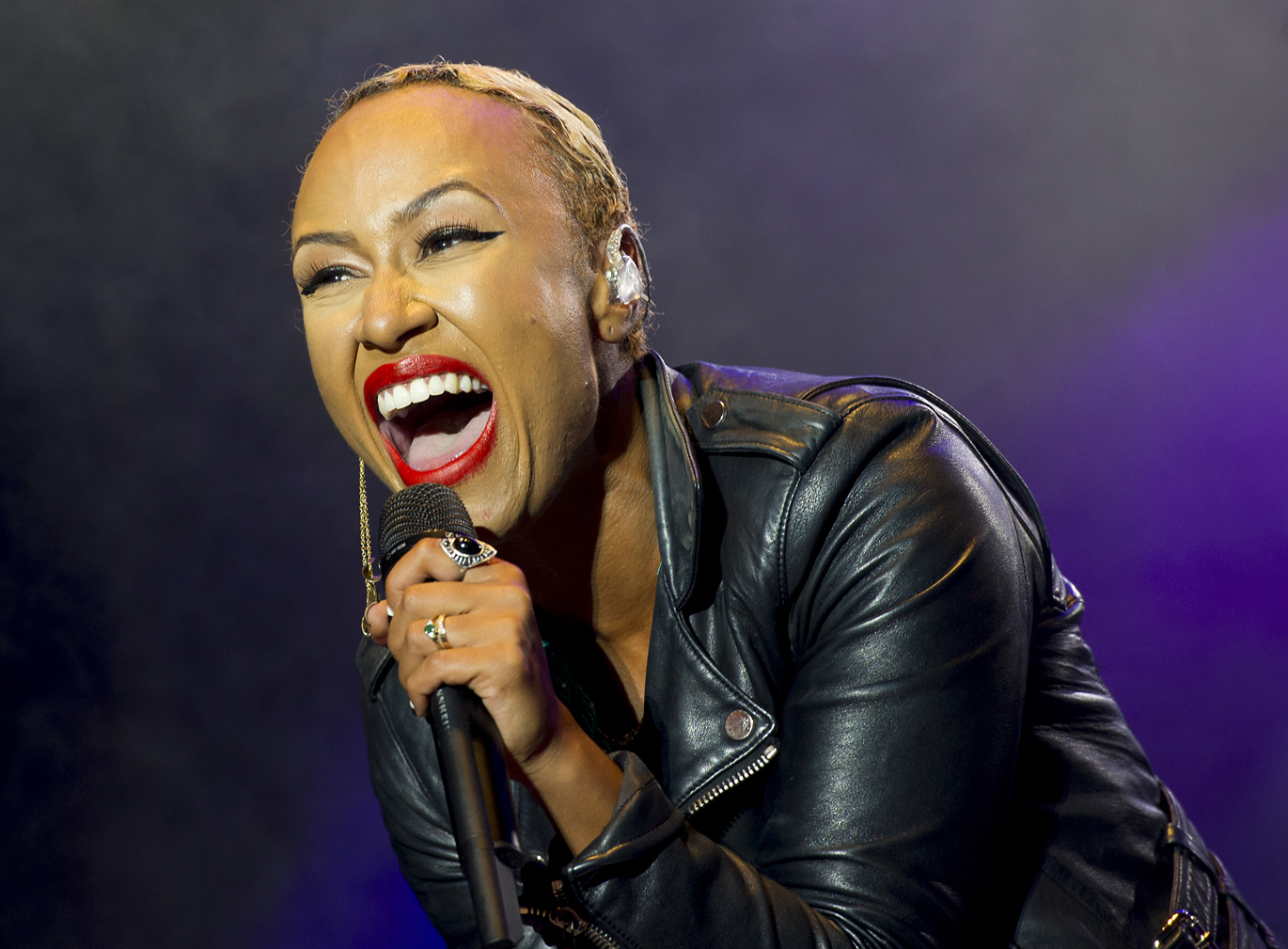
Sandé performing at the 2013 Gibraltar Music Festival

The Our Version of Events Tour started in November 2011. In December 2011, Sandé supported Coldplay on their Mylo Xyloto Tour and supported them again in July 2012 for the North America dates. Sandé performed special concerts in Cardiff, Glasgow, Inverness, Aberdeen, Dundee and Edinburgh as part of Olympic Torch Relay Celebrations Concerts as well as perform at opening and closing ceremonies of 2012 London Olympics as well as some of major festivals of 2012 at T in the Park and V Festival.

As the summer music festival season winded down, Sandé toured in November 2012 with five special dates in Dublin, Glasgow, Birmingham, London and Manchester. The tour started in Dublin on 5 November and finished at The Bridgewater in Manchester on 11 November. After which, Sande performed two dates in Toronto and Montreal on 23 and 24 November 2012. Two more nights at the Manchester Central and the Hammersmith Apollo on 9 and 19 December 2012 rounded off the year.

From January 2013 to February 2013, Sandé toured majority of States in the United States as part of her headlining shows in North America. It kicked off in Atlanta on 12 January 2013 and finished in San Diego on 7 February 2013. Sandé will then return to Europe to start her last Europe leg.

It was confirmed during a webchat at her BBC Radio 2 concert on 28 February, that she'll be touring U.S. in May/June and Australia in June 2013.

== Critical reception ==
Professional ratings
Aggregate scores
Source	Rating
Metacritic	67/100
Review scores
Source	Rating
AllMusic	3.5/5 stars
The Daily Telegraph	4/5 stars
Digital Spy	4/5 stars
Fact	2/5 stars
The Guardian	3/5 stars
The Independent	4/5 stars
musicOMH	3/5 stars
The Observer	2/5 stars
RWD	4/5 stars
The Scotsman	3/5 stars

The album received generally positive reviews from music critics. Hattie Collins, editor of RWD Magazine gave Our Version of Events a positive review stating, "This is an album that deserves all the success it will no doubt receive." BBC said that they expected the album to be very poppy as she has written for pop acts like Sugababes, Leona Lewis and Alesha Dixon. However, they pointed out that this does not arrive as they said; "we do have a charming and occasionally moving record full of care and polish, effort and grace." They also pointed out that the album reflects Stevie Wonder, Mary J. Blige and George Michael. Digital Spy said that the album gives off a passion, desire and an overcoming-the-odds messages in Our Version of Events. They said; "it's hard to imagine Sandé was destined to do anything else in life. Better yet, it sounds like she's only just got started." The Boston Globe gave it a positive review.

== Commercial performance ==
Upon the release of the album, Our Version of Events debuted at number one on 19 February 2012 on the UK Albums Chart. During the first week of the release of her debut album, it sold 113,319 copies. This made the album the second fastest-selling album of 2012, coming in behind Lana Del Rey's debut album, Born to Die. It then became the best selling first week sales for a debut album by a British female solo artist since Susan Boyle released I Dreamed a Dream in 2009, which also debuted at number one with first week sales of 411,820 copies. During the second week of the album, Our Version of Events dropped one place to number two after Adele's second album 21 sold just over 1,000 more copies than Sandé. By the album's third week, it pushed 21 off the top spot and returned to number one again for the second time. On the fourth week in the chart, the album dropped to number three, after Bruce Springsteen's Wrecking Ball debuted at number one and the Military Wives's In My Dreams charted at number two. Despite the album on aim to chart at number one on the Irish Album Chart, the album debuted at number two. Fifteen weeks after the album was first released, the album reclaimed the number one spot on sales of only 13,430 copies, the lowest sales for a number-one album since Ace of Base's Happy Nation sold 12,042 copies at number one in June 1994. On 23 December 2012 the album reclaimed the number 1 spot yet again on sales of 178,000 besting the opening sales. By the end of 2012, the album had sold 1,393,000 copies in the UK alone, making it the biggest selling album of the year.

In April 2013, the Official Charts Company confirmed that Sandé had broken The Beatles' Please Please Me chart record of spending the most consecutive weeks in the UK's Official Albums Chart Top 10 of any debut album. On 26 May 2013, the album dropped out of the Top 10 for the first time ever after spending 66 consecutive weeks in the top 10. On 24 November 2013, the album dropped out of the top 40 for the first time ever. In addition to being the best-selling album of 2012 in the UK, it was also the best-selling album throughout 2013, until One Direction's third album Midnight Memories surged ahead of the album during the final week of 2013, with 685,000 copies sold as opposed to Sandé's 683,000. As of June 2015, Our Version of Events has sold over 2,260,000 copies in the UK and is the fourth best-selling album of the 2010s there.

As of 5 October 2016, the album has sold 278,000 copies in the US.

== Track listing ==
International version

Standard edition
No.	Title	Writer(s)	Producer(s)	Length
1.	"Heaven"	Emeli Sandé; Shahid Khan; Harry Craze; Hugo Chegwin; Mike Spencer	Mike Spencer	4:12
2.	"My Kind of Love"	Sandé; Emile Haynie	Emile Haynie; Danny Keyz; Craze & Hoax^	3:18
3.	"Where I Sleep"	Sandé; Khan	Naughty Boy	2:11
4.	"Mountains"	Sandé; Khan; James Murray; Mustafa Omer; Luke Juby	Mojam Music; Naughty Boy	4:10
5.	"Clown"	Sandé; Khan; Grant Mitchell	Naughty Boy	3:41
6.	"Daddy" (featuring Naughty Boy)	Sandé; Khan; Murray; Omer; Mitchell	Naughty Boy; Mojam Music*	3:08
7.	"Maybe"	Sandé; Paul Herman; Ash Millard	Herman & Millard; Mojam Music*	3:47
8.	"Suitcase"	Sandé; Khan; Ben Harrison; L.Juby	Naughty Boy; Harrison*; Mojam Music*	3:06
9.	"Breaking the Law"	Sandé; Khan; Harrison	Naughty Boy	2:55
10.	"Next to Me"	Sandé; Craze; Chegwin	Craze & Hoax; Mojam Music*	3:16
11.	"River"	Sandé; Khan	Naughty Boy	4:39
12.	"Lifetime"	Sandé; Khan; Glyn Aikins; L.Juby; Steve Mostyn	Naughty Boy	2:53
13.	"Hope"	Sandé; Alicia Keys	Alicia Keys	2:58
14.	"Read All About It, Pt. III"	Stephen Manderson; Iain James; Tom Barnes; Ben Kohn; Pete Kelleher; Sandé	Gavin Powell	4:42
Total length:				48:56

iTunes Store bonus content
No.	Title	Writer(s)	Producer(s)	Length
15.	"Tiger"	Emeli Sandé; Shahid Khan	Naughty Boy	2:58
16.	"Heaven" (Video)	Sandé; Khan; Craze; Chegwin; Spencer	Mike Spencer	4:14
17.	"Daddy" (Video)	Sandé; Khan; Murray; Omer; Mitchell	Naughty Boy; Mojam Music*	3:20
18.	"Where I Sleep" (Live From Air Edel)	Sandé	Naughty Boy	2:58
19.	"Her Version of Events" (Documentary Video)	Sandé	Sandé	11:35

Special edition bonus tracks
No.	Title	Writer(s)	Producer(s)	Length
15.	"Wonder" (Naughty Boy featuring Emeli Sandé)	Sandé; Khan; Chegwin; Craze	Naughty Boy	3:28
16.	"Breaking the Law" (Alternate Version)	Sandé; Khan; Harrison	Naughty Boy	3:49
17.	"Easier in Bed"	Sandé; Naughty Boy; Loco	Naughty Boy	3:06
18.	"Beneath Your Beautiful" (Labrinth featuring Emeli Sandé)	Sandé; Timothy McKenzie; Mike Posner	Labrinth; Da Diggla	4:33
19.	"Imagine"	John Lennon	Naughty Boy	3:08

iTunes Store special edition bonus tracks
No.	Title	Writer(s)	Producer(s)	Length
15.	"Tiger"	Sandé; Khan	Naughty Boy	2:58
16.	"Wonder" (Naughty Boy featuring Emeli Sandé)	Sandé; Khan; Chegwin; Craze	Naughty Boy	3:28
17.	"Breaking the Law" (Alternate Version)	Sandé; Khan; Harrison	Naughty Boy	3:49
18.	"Easier in Bed"	Sandé; Naughty Boy; Loco	Naughty Boy	3:06
19.	"Beneath Your Beautiful" (Labrinth featuring Emeli Sandé)	Sandé; McKenzie; Posner	Labrinth; Da Diggla	4:33
20.	"Imagine"	John Lennon	Naughty Boy	3:08
21.	"Heaven" (Video)	Sandé; Khan; Craze; Chegwin; Spencer	Mike Spencer	4:14
22.	"Daddy" (Video)	Sandé; Khan; Murray; Omer; Mitchell	Naughty Boy; Mojam Music*	3:20
23.	"Next to Me" (Video)	Sandé; Craze; Chegwin	Craze & Hoax; Mojam Music*	3:16
24.	"My Kind of Love" (Video)	Sandé; Haynie; Keyz	Emile Haynie; Danny Keyz; Craze & Hoax^	3:18
25.	"Wonder" (Video)	Sandé; Khan; Chegwin; Craze	Naughty Boy	3:28

German special edition bonus tracks
No.	Title	Writer(s)	Producer(s)	Length
15.	"Wonder" (Naughty Boy featuring Emeli Sandé)	Sandé; Khan; Chegwin; Craze	Naughty Boy	3:28
16.	"Breaking the Law" (Alternate Version)	Sandé; Khan; Harrison	Naughty Boy	3:49
17.	"Easier in Bed"	Sandé; Naughty Boy; Loco	Naughty Boy	3:06
18.	"Beneath Your Beautiful" (Labrinth featuring Emeli Sandé)	Sandé; McKenzie; Posner	Labrinth; Da Diggla	4:33
19.	"Imagine"	John Lennon	Naughty Boy	3:08
20.	"Heaven" (Youthkills Mix)	Sandé; Khan; Craze; Chegwin; Spencer	Mike Spencer	3:34

Tesco special edition bonus tracks
No.	Title	Writer(s)	Producer(s)	Length
15.	"Wonder" (Naughty Boy featuring Emeli Sandé)	Sandé; Khan; Chegwin; Craze	Naughty Boy	3:28
16.	"Beneath Your Beautiful" (Labrinth featuring Emeli Sandé)	Sandé; McKenzie; Posner	Labrinth; Da Diggla	4:33
17.	"Breaking the Law" (Alternate Version)	Sandé; Khan; Harrison	Naughty Boy	3:49
18.	"Easier in Bed"	Sandé; Naughty Boy; Loco	Naughty Boy	3:06
19.	"Abide with Me"	William Henry Monk; Henry Francis Lyte	Naughty Boy	3:38

Japanese special edition bonus tracks
No.	Title	Writer(s)	Producer(s)	Length
15.	"Tiger"	Emeli Sandé; Shahid Khan	Naughty Boy	2:58
16.	"Heaven" (Nu:Tone Remix)	Sandé; Khan; Craze; Chegwin; Spencer	Mike Spencer	5:58
17.	"Next to Me" (Mojam Remix)	Sandé; Craze; Chegwin	Craze & Hoax; Mojam Music*	4:22

Latin American deluxe edition bonus tracks
No.	Title	Length
20.	"Next to Me" (Kendrick Lamar Remix)	3:57
21.	"Next to Me" (featuring Alejandro Sanz)	3:17

Extra bonus tracks edition
No.	Title	Length
20.	"Next to Me" (Kendrick Lamar Remix)	3:57
21.	"My Kind of Love" (RedOne and Alex P Remix)	4:26

Notes

- ^{*} co-producer or additional production by
- ^{^} vocal producer

US version

US standard edition
No.	Title	Writer(s)	Producer(s)	Length
1.	"Heaven"	Sandé; Khan; Craze; Chegwin; Spencer	Mike Spencer	4:12
2.	"My Kind of Love"	Sandé; Haynie; Keyz	Haynie; Keyz; Craze & Hoax^	3:18
3.	"Where I Sleep"	Sandé	Naughty Boy	2:11
4.	"Wonder" (Naughty Boy featuring Emeli Sandé)	Sandé; Khan; Chegwin; Craze	Naughty Boy	3:23
5.	"Mountains"	Sandé; Khan; Murray; Omer; Juby	Mojam Music; Naughty Boy	4:10
6.	"Clown"	Sandé; Khan; Mitchell	Naughty Boy	3:41
7.	"Daddy" (featuring Naughty Boy)	Sandé; Khan; Murray; Omer; Mitchell	Naughty Boy; Mojam Music*	3:08
8.	"Maybe"	Sandé; Herman; Millard	Herman & Millard; Mojam Music*	3:47
9.	"Suitcase"	Sandé; Khan; Harrison	Naughty Boy; Harrison*; Mojam Music*	3:06
10.	"Breaking the Law"	Sandé; Khan; Harrison	Naughty Boy	2:55
11.	"Next to Me"	Sandé; Craze; Chegwin	Craze & Hoax; Mojam Music*	3:16
12.	"River"	Sandé; Khan	Naughty Boy	4:39
13.	"Lifetime"	Sandé; Khan; Steve Mostyn	Naughty Boy	2:53
14.	"Hope"	Sandé; Keys	Alicia Keys	2:58

Target deluxe edition bonus tracks
No.	Title	Writer(s)	Producer(s)	Length
15.	"Beneath Your Beautiful" (Labrinth featuring Emeli Sandé)	McKenzie; Sandé; Mike Posner	Labrinth; Da Digglar	4:33
16.	"Read All About It, Pt. III"	Manderson; James; Barnes; Kohn; Kelleher; Sandé	Gavin Powell	4:42
17.	"Next to Me" (Remix featuring Kendrick Lamar)	Sandé; Craze; Chegwin; Paul; Kendrick Duckworth	Craze & Hoax; Mojam Music*	3:57
18.	"My Kind of Love" (RedOne and Alex P Remix)	Sandé; Haynie; Keyz	Haynie; Keyz; Craze & Hoax^; RedOne; Alex P	4:26
19.	"Here It Comes" (with Rick Smith)	Sandé; Smith	Smith	7:41

iTunes Store standard edition bonus track
No.	Title	Writer(s)	Producer(s)	Length
15.	"Tiger"	Sandé; Khan	Naughty Boy	2:58

iTunes Store deluxe edition bonus tracks
No.	Title	Writer(s)	Producer(s)	Length
15.	"Tiger"	Sandé; Khan	Naughty Boy	2:58
16.	"Read All About It, Pt. III"	Sandé; James; Barnes; Kohn; Kelleher	Gavin Powell	4:42
17.	"Daddy" (LA Riots Club Mix)	Sandé; Khan; Murray; Omer; Mitchell	Naughty Boy; Mojam Music*	6:30
18.	"Daddy" (7th Heaven Mixshow Edit)	Sandé; Khan; Murray; Omer; Mitchell	Naughty Boy; Mojam Music*	5:06
19.	"Every Teardrop Is a Waterfall" ("One Mic, One Take" Live Video)	Coldplay; Eno; Allen; Anderson	Sandé	3:15

Amazon MP3 store standard edition bonus track
No.	Title	Writer(s)	Producer(s)	Length
15.	"Easier in Bed"	Sandé; Khan	Naughty Boy	3:05

Amazon MP3 store special edition bonus tracks
No.	Title	Writer(s)	Producer(s)	Length
15.	"Easier in Bed"	Sandé; Khan	Naughty Boy	3:05
16.	"Read All About It, Pt. III"	Sandé; James; Barnes; Kohn; Kelleher	Gavin Powell	4:42
17.	"Daddy" (LA Riots Club Mix)	Sandé; Khan; Murray; Omer; Mitchell	Naughty Boy; Mojam Music*	6:30
18.	"Daddy" (7th Heaven Mixshow Edit)	Sandé; Khan; Murray; Omer; Mitchell	Naughty Boy; Mojam Music*	5:06
19.	"Every Teardrop Is a Waterfall" ("One Mic, One Take" Live Video)	Coldplay; Eno; Allen; Anderson	Sandé	3:15

7 Digital store deluxe edition bonus tracks
No.	Title	Writer(s)	Producer(s)	Length
15.	"Read All About It (Part III)"	Sandé; James; Barnes; Kohn; Kelleher	Gavin Powell	4:42
16.	"Daddy" (LA Riots Club Mix)	Sandé; Khan; Murray; Omer; Mitchell	Naughty Boy; Mojam Music*	6:30
17.	"Daddy" (7th Heaven Mixshow Edit)	Sandé; Khan; Murray; Omer; Mitchell	Naughty Boy; Mojam Music*	5:06

Notes

- ^{*} co-producer or additional production by
- ^{^} vocal producer

== Charts ==
=== Weekly charts ===
Chart (2012–2013)	Peak position
Argentine Albums (CAPIF)	8
Australian Albums (ARIA)	17
Australian Urban Albums (ARIA)	3
Austrian Albums (Ö3 Austria)	17
Belgian Albums (Ultratop Flanders)	3
Belgian Albums (Ultratop Wallonia)	10
Canadian Albums (Billboard)	22
Danish Albums (Hitlisten)	8
Dutch Albums (Album Top 100)	3
Finnish Albums (Suomen virallinen lista)	5
French Albums (SNEP)	9
German Albums (Offizielle Top 100)	7
Irish Albums (IRMA)	1
Italian Albums (FIMI)	24
New Zealand Albums (RMNZ)	9
Norwegian Albums (VG-lista)	15
Polish Albums (ZPAV)	29
Portuguese Albums (AFP)	20
Scottish Albums (Official Charts)	1
Spanish Albums (Promusicae)	19
Swedish Albums (Sverigetopplistan)	27
Swiss Albums (Schweizer Hitparade)	6
UK Albums (Official Charts)	1
US Billboard 200	28
US Top R&B/Hip-Hop Albums (Billboard)	4

=== Year-end charts ===
Chart (2012)	Position
Belgian Albums (Ultratop Flanders)	9
Belgian Albums (Ultratop Wallonia)	83
Dutch Albums (Album Top 100)	31
French Albums (SNEP)	37
German Albums (Offizielle Top 100)	53
Irish Albums (IRMA)	4
Italian Albums (FIMI)	79
Swiss Albums (Schweizer Hitparade)	44
UK Albums (OCC)	1
US Top R&B/Hip-Hop Albums (Billboard)	76
Chart (2013)	Position
Belgian Albums (Ultratop Flanders)	18
Belgian Albums (Ultratop Wallonia)	66
Dutch Albums (Album Top 100)	15
French Albums (SNEP)	75
German Albums (Offizielle Top 100)	43
Irish Albums (IRMA)	3
New Zealand Albums (RMNZ)	43
Swiss Albums (Schweizer Hitparade)	19
UK Albums (OCC)	2
US Billboard 200	190
US Top R&B/Hip-Hop Albums (Billboard)	39
Chart (2014)	Position
UK Albums (OCC)	75

=== Decade-end charts ===
Chart (2010–2019)	Position
Dutch Albums (Album Top 100)	54
UK Albums (OCC)	8

=== All-time charts ===
Chart	Position
Irish Female Albums (IRMA)	26

== Certifications ==
Region	Certification	Certified units/sales
Australia (ARIA)	Gold	35,000^{^}
Belgium (BRMA)	Gold	15,000^{*}
Denmark (IFPI Danmark)	Platinum	20,000^{‡}
France (SNEP)	Platinum	100,000^{*}
Germany (BVMI)	3× Gold	300,000^{‡}
Ireland (IRMA)	3× Platinum	45,000^{^}
Italy (FIMI)	Gold	25,000^{*}
Netherlands (NVPI)	Platinum	50,000^{^}
New Zealand (RMNZ)	Platinum	15,000^{‡}
Switzerland (IFPI Switzerland)	Gold	15,000^{^}
United Kingdom (BPI)	8× Platinum	2,367,340
United States (RIAA)	Gold	500,000^{‡}
Summaries
Europe (IFPI)	2× Platinum	2,000,000^{*}
^{*} Sales figures based on certification alone.^{^} Shipments figures based on certification alone.^{‡} Sales+streaming figures based on certification alone.

== Release history ==
List of release dates showing countries, formats and record labels
Country	Release date	Edition	Record Label(s)
United Kingdom	13 February 2012	Standard edition	Virgin; EMI Records
Spain	14 February 2012	Standard edition	EMI Music
Germany	9 March 2012	Standard edition	EMI Music
United States	5 June 2012	Standard edition	Capitol Records
United Kingdom	22 October 2012	Special edition	Virgin; EMI Records
