= Read All About It, Pt. III =

2011 song by Emeli Sandé

Song by Emeli Sandé

from the album Our Version of Events
- Recorded: 2011
- Studio: Air-Edel Studios (London, England)
- Genre: R&B; soul
- Length: 4:42
- Label: Virgin
- Songwriters: Stephen Manderson; Iain James; Tom Barnes; Ben Kohn; Pete Kelleher; Emeli Sandé
- Producer: Gavin Powell

"Read All About It, Pt. III" is a song by Scottish recording artist Emeli Sandé, from her debut album, Our Version of Events (2012). The song was written by Sandé, Professor Green, Iain James, Tom Barnes, Ben Kohn and Pete Kelleher and produced by Gavin Powell. It is a sequel to the 2011 hit single "Read All About It", which appears on Professor Green's second studio album, At Your Inconvenience (2011). The song was first performed at the 2012 Summer Olympics closing ceremony. It has received positive reviews from critics.

== Background ==
In 2010, Sandé began working with Professor Green on her debut album. The pair had previously worked together on the rapper's debut album Alive Till I'm Dead (2010), featuring on the track "Kids That Love to Dance". Sandé got on with Professor Green and the pair returned a year later and worked on his second studio album, At Your Inconvenience (2011), with Sandé featuring on "Read All About It". Professor Green released the song as the lead single from the album, and it peaked at number-one on the UK Singles Chart.

Following the release and the commercial success of the song, in 2011, Sandé wanted to record her own version of the song. Sandé said that after she and Professor Green had done many shows together to promote the song, she heard and saw how personal the song was for him. She said the song started to make her think "what does the song mean to me, and what's my interpretation of it?". Sandé then decided to write her own version of the song. She said that she wrote the song like it was a story of her life, and that it is different from the original song. Critics often pick out the similarities between "Read All About It" and "Love the Way You Lie" and then "Read All About It, Pt. III" and "Love the Way You Lie (Part II)". Following its performance at the Olympics, "Read All About It, Pt. III" began to get airplay on BBC Radio 2.

== Live performances ==
Sandé notably performed the track on 12 August 2012 as part of the 2012 Summer Olympics closing ceremony, opening the show itself when she performed acoustically from the back seat of a car. Sandé proceeded to reprise the track later in the ceremony, shortly after Ray Davies' performance of "Waterloo Sunset".

The song was used as the music for the 2013 audition of Attraction on Britain's Got Talent.

The performance saw a significant rise in sales of Sandé's music digitally, with "Read All About It, Pt. III" reaching a peak of number eleven on UK iTunes within twelve hours of the ceremony.

== Charts ==
=== Weekly charts ===
Chart (2012–2013)	Peak position
Australia (ARIA)	40
Austria (Ö3 Austria Top 75)	4
Belgium (Ultratop 50 Flanders)	24
Belgium (Ultratop 50 Wallonia)	3
Denmark (Tracklisten)	20
France (SNEP)	7
Germany (GfK)	5
Hungary (Single Top 40)	17
Ireland (IRMA)	5
Italy (FIMI)	64
Luxembourg Digital Songs (Billboard)	5
Netherlands (Dutch Top 40)	4
Netherlands (Single Top 100)	5
New Zealand (Recorded Music NZ)	38
Scotland Singles (OCC)	3
Spain (Spanish Singles Chart)	24
Sweden (Sverigetopplistan)	20
Switzerland (Schweizer Hitparade)	3
UK Singles (OCC)	3

2025 Weekly chart performance for "Read All About It, Pt. III"
Chart (2025)	Peak position
Moldova Airplay (TopHit)	84

=== Year-end charts ===
Chart (2012)	Position
Austria (Ö3 Austria Top 40)	66
France (SNEP)	69
Germany (Media Control AG)	38
Switzerland (Schweizer Hitparade)	22
UK Singles (Official Charts Company)	61
Chart (2013)	Position
Belgium (Ultratop Flanders)	56
Belgium (Ultratop Wallonia)	21
France (SNEP)	37
Germany (Media Control AG)	67
Netherlands (Dutch Top 40)	19
Netherlands (Single Top 100)	28
Switzerland (Schweizer Hitparade)	41
UK Singles (Official Charts Company)	120

== Certifications ==
Region	Certification	Certified units/sales
Australia (ARIA)	Gold	35,000^{^}
Austria (IFPI Austria)	Gold	15,000^{*}
Belgium (BRMA)	Gold	15,000^{*}
Brazil (Pro-Música Brasil)	Gold	30,000^{‡}
Germany (BVMI)	3× Gold	450,000^{‡}
Italy (FIMI)	Gold	25,000^{‡}
New Zealand (RMNZ)	Platinum	30,000^{‡}
Spain (PROMUSICAE)	Gold	30,000^{‡}
Switzerland (IFPI Switzerland)	2× Platinum	60,000^{^}
United Kingdom (BPI)	2× Platinum	1,200,000^{‡}
Streaming
Denmark (IFPI Danmark)	Gold	900,000^{†}
^{*} Sales figures based on certification alone.^{^} Shipments figures based on certification alone.^{‡} Sales+streaming figures based on certification alone.^{†} Streaming-only figures based on certification alone.
