= Read All About It (song) =

2011 single by Professor Green

Single by Professor Green featuring Emeli Sandé or Dolcenera

from the album At Your Inconvenience
- Released: 21 October 2011
- Recorded: 2011
- Studio: Air-Edel Studios (London, England)
- Genre: Hip hop; R&B
- Length: 3:55
- Label: Virgin
- Songwriters: Stephen Manderson; Tom Barnes; Ben Kohn; Peter Kelleher; Iain James; Adele Sandé
- Producers: TMS; iSHi

Professor Green singles chronology
"In the Air" (2011)	"Read All About It" (2011)	"Never Be a Right Time" (2012)

Emeli Sandé singles chronology
"Heaven" (2011)	"Read All About It" (2011)	"Daddy" (2011)

Dolcenera singles chronology
"L'amore è un gioco" (2011)	"Read All About It (Tutto quello che devi sapere)" (2011)	"Ci vediamo a casa" (2012)

"Read All About It" is a song by British rapper Professor Green which features vocals from British singer-songwriter Emeli Sandé. The track served as the lead single for Professor Green's second studio album, At Your Inconvenience and was released as a digital download in the United Kingdom on 23 October 2011. The track debuted at number-one in the UK with sales of over 153,000 copies and spent two consecutive weeks at the peak. "Read All About It" is a hip hop and R&B song.

Additional versions of the song, entitled "Read All About It, Pt. II", by Professor Green featuring Fink and "Read All About It, Pt. III", by Sandé on her own, were recorded for Q magazine and Sandé's album Our Version of Events respectively.

A half-Italian version of the song, titled "Read All About It (Tutto quello che devi sapere)" and featuring Italian singer-songwriter Dolcenera, was released as a digital single in Italy on 9 December 2011. This version of the song was included on the Italian version of Professor Green's At Your Inconvenience, as well as on Dolcenera's Evoluzione della specie².

== Critical reception ==
Robert Copsey of Digital Spy gave the song a very positive review stating:

If we were to liken it to the US rapper (Eminem), we'd suggest 'Read All About It' was his 'Cleanin' Out My Closet' moment; but in truth its lyrical content is too personal to be compared to his peers. "I wasn't even 5/ Life's a journey and mine wasn't an easy ride," he says of the tense relationship with his family after his father committed suicide, before a stadium-sized chorus courtesy of R&B-soul singer Emeli Sandé ensues. It may doff its cap to the rapping greats, but few can deny this is all Pro Green.

== Music video ==
A music video to accompany the release of "Read All About It" was first released onto YouTube on 15 September 2011 at a total length of three minutes and fifty-four seconds.

The video begins with a five-year-old boy (in the same situation Professor Green was in at that age) staring at his step-mother working and his younger half-sister playing. The child's step-mother realises that her step-son is outside staring inside the house, she then calls the child's father. Later on in the video you can see the boy's father talking to someone on the phone (probably the boy's mother). Later the child goes upstairs into what appears to be his old room and damages many things (such as pictures). His father catches him and his step-mother screams at him, the child also screams back. In the end he puts his hands on his ears and closes his eyes. When he opens his eyes, he finds himself in a warehouse. Then he sees Professor Green entering through the front door. The video also shows Professor Green rapping outside the warehouse against a background of altocumulus and stratocumulus clouds lit by the setting sun, as well as Emeli Sandé singing in the rain at night. This video is loosely based on the life of Professor Green himself.

== Live performances ==
On 5 October 2011, Professor Green and Emeli Sandé performed the song live at the MOBO Awards at the SECC in Glasgow. They performed the song on The X Factor Results Show on 23 October 2011. On 18 November 2011 they performed the song live on Children in Need 2011. On 28 January 2012, Professor Green and Dolcenera performed the song live during the first episode of the Italian show London Live 2.0. On 16 February 2012, they also performed the song during the third night of the 62nd Sanremo Music Festival. In August 2012, Green and Sandé performed the song during Green's set at both parks at the V Festival. This was the only festival Green and Sandé performed the song together at. The song was also again performed together at Sandé's Royal Albert Hall gig in London on 11 November 2012.

== Chart performance ==
"Read All About It" first charted on 28 October 2011, when it debuted at number two on the Irish Singles Chart. The track then debuted at number one on the UK Singles Chart on 30 October 2011 with sales of over 153,000 copies; the second biggest first-week sales of 2011 behind "What Makes You Beautiful" by One Direction. Marking the first number-one single for both Professor Green and Emeli Sandé, the track spent two consecutive weeks at the peak; falling to number four on 13 November 2011 to accommodate the return of "We Found Love" by Rihanna and Calvin Harris at the chart summit. The single also debuted at number one on both the R&B chart and Scottish chart on 30 October. "Read All About It" was certified Gold on 25 May by the British Phonographic Industry (BPI) for surpassing sales of 400,000 copies in the United Kingdom.

== Track listing ==
iTunes EP
No.	Title	Length
1.	"Read All About It" (feat. Emeli Sandé)	3:55
2.	"Read All About It" (Instrumental Version)	3:54
3.	"Read All About It" (Cahill Remix) [feat. Emeli Sandé])	6:21
4.	"Read All About It" (Nu:Tone Remix) [feat. Emeli Sandé] [Explicit])	5:11

Read All About It (Tutto quello che devi sapere) – single
No.	Title	Length
1.	"Read All About It (Tutto quello che devi sapere)" (feat. Dolcenera)	3:55

== Charts and certifications ==
=== Weekly charts ===
Chart (2011)	Peak position
Australia (ARIA)	34
Australian Urban (ARIA)	14
Belgium (Ultratop 50 Flanders)	21
Belgium (Ultratip Bubbling Under Wallonia)	4
Bulgaria Airplay (BAMP)	3
Czech Republic Airplay (ČNS IFPI)	12
Germany (GfK)	80
Ireland (IRMA)	2
Italy (FIMI) feat. Dolcenera	18
Romania (Romanian Radio Airplay)	1
Russia Airplay (TopHit)	6
Scotland Singles (OCC)	1
Switzerland (Schweizer Hitparade)	58
UK Singles (OCC)	1
UK Hip Hop/R&B (OCC)	1
Ukraine Airplay (TopHit)	69

=== Year-end charts ===
Chart (2011)	Position
UK Singles (OCC)	37
Chart (2012)	Position
UK Singles (OCC)	156
Russia Airplay (TopHit)	34

=== Certifications ===
Region	Certification	Certified units/sales
Australia (ARIA)	Platinum	70,000^{^}
Italy (FIMI) feat. Dolcenera	Gold	15,000^{*}
United Kingdom (BPI)	Platinum	600,000^{‡}
^{*} Sales figures based on certification alone.^{^} Shipments figures based on certification alone.^{‡} Sales+streaming figures based on certification alone.

== Other versions ==
=== Part II ===
"Read All About It, Pt. II" is a version of the song by Professor Green featuring English recording artist Fink.

=== Part III ===
"Read All About It, Pt. III" is a song by Emeli Sandé which appears on her debut studio album, Our Version of Events (2012). The song is the fourteenth and final track on the album and was produced by Gavin Powell. The song itself is a continuation from "Read All About It".

== Release history ==
Region	Date	Format	Label	Version
Ireland	21 October 2011	Digital download	Virgin Records	Professor Green featuring Emeli Sandé
United Kingdom	23 October 2011	Digital download	Virgin Records	Professor Green featuring Emeli Sandé
Italy	9 December 2011	Digital download	Virgin Records	Professor Green featuring Dolcenera
