= My Kind of Love (song) =

2012 single by Emeli Sandé

Single by Emeli Sandé

from the album Our Version of Events
- Released: 8 June 2012
- Genre: R&B; soul
- Length: 3:18 (radio mix); 4:24 (RedOne & Alex P Remix)
- Label: Virgin
- Songwriters: Emeli Sandé; Ian Robinson; Emile Haynie; M. Birdsong; Daniel "Danny Keyz" Tannenbaum
- Producers: Emile Haynie; Danny Keyz; Craze & Hoax^

Emeli Sandé singles chronology
"Next to Me" (2012)	"My Kind of Love" (2012)	"Wonder" (2012)

"My Kind of Love" is a song recorded by Scottish recording artist Emeli Sandé for her debut studio album, Our Version of Events (2012). It was released on 8 June 2012 as the album's fourth single and would go on to become a top-twenty hit on the UK Singles Chart. A year after its first release, in August 2013, It was announced that "My Kind of Love" would serve as the second single for the American market, after "Next to Me" was released as the album's first single. A brand new music video for the American release began production in mid-August.

== Background ==
While many media outlets slated "Where I Sleep" to be released the fourth single, "My Kind of Love" was announced as the fourth single from the album on 18 April 2012. The track was written by Sandé, Ian Robinson, Emile Haynie and Danny Keyz, whilst production of the song was completed by Haynie, Daniel "Danny Keyz" Tannenbaum and Craze & Hoax. It is the only song on the album to have been produced by more than one producer. "My Kind of Love" is an R&B song that draws from the soul genre. On 6 May 2012, Sandé performed "My Kind of Love" on the first series of The Voice UK, during the second live show.

== Music video ==
A music video to accompany the release of "My Kind of Love" was first released onto YouTube on 20 April 2012 at a total length of three minutes and forty-seven seconds. The video was directed by British music video director Dawn Shadforth. Former Skins star Laya Lewis features in the clip alongside Sandé. In the video, Sandé enters a hospital to visit a childhood friend who appears to be extremely depressed and suffering from terminal cancer. Sandé gives her friend a pink wig to wear as the cancer has taken her hair. After helping her to get dressed, Sandé takes her out of the hospital and drives her to the seafront amusements in Hastings to make the last of her days the best she has ever had. Sandé also takes her to a park, intercut with scenes of them there when they were young. The video ends with Sandé and her friend sitting on a hill above the seaside town and her sitting in the hospital corridor, seemingly having taken her friend back. The video uses the radio mix of the song, which is slightly remixed from the album version, and an additional piano riff introduction was added for the video.

On 25 July 2013, Sandé filmed a second video for the single's RedOne and Alex P Remix, which she uploaded to her VEVO account on 5 September 2013. It features different, interspersed stories depicting conflict, with bullets representing hurtful words: the first is about a couple fighting, the next is about a little girl whose horse is old and that her father wants to put down, and the third is a young man who struggles with being different and being insulted by a group of hecklers for not wanting to join in with the crowd. There are also scenes of the aftermath of the conflicts, with the couple appearing to have reconciled, the little girl riding her horse, and the young man turning to his art to express himself. Meanwhile, Sandé is seen in a room where fog surrounds her and rain falls down on her as she sings. The video was directed by Sanji and the cinematographer was Eric Wycoff.

== Track listing ==
- Digital EP
1. "My Kind of Love" (Radio Mix) – 3:19
2. "My Kind of Love" (Live from Hollywood) – 3:46
3. "My Kind of Love" (Gemini Remix) – 4:19
4. "My Kind of Love" (Machinedrum Remix) – 5:43
5. "My Kind of Love" (Wideboys Remix) – 6:30
- Digital download – Remix
1. "My Kind of Love" (RedOne and Alex P remix) – 4:24

== Charts and certifications ==
=== Weekly charts ===
Chart (2012–2014)	Peak position
Australia (ARIA)	60
Belgium (Ultratop 50 Flanders)	22
France (SNEP)	167
Greece Digital Songs (Billboard)	3
Ireland (IRMA)	35
Italy (FIMI)	35
Netherlands (Single Top 100)	79
Scottish Singles Sales (Official Charts)	29
South Korea International (Circle)	47
Romania Airplay (Media Forest)	6
Romania TV Airplay (Media Forest)	8
UK Singles (Official Charts)	17
US Bubbling Under Hot 100 (Billboard)	14
US Adult Pop Airplay (Billboard)	24
US Pop Airplay (Billboard)	35

=== Year-end charts ===
Chart (2012)	Position
UK Singles (OCC)	97

=== Certifications ===
Region	Certification	Certified units/sales
Australia (ARIA)	Gold	35,000^{^}
United Kingdom (BPI)	Gold	400,000^{‡}
^{^} Shipments figures based on certification alone.^{‡} Sales+streaming figures based on certification alone.

== Cover versions ==
- On 11 November 2013, Tessanne Chin covered the song on Season 5 of NBC's singing competition, The Voice for the Live Top 12 round.

== Release history ==
Country	Release date	Format(s)	Label
Ireland	8 June 2012	Digital download	Virgin Records
United Kingdom	10 June 2012	Digital download	Virgin Records
United States	5 August 2013	Hot AC radio	Capitol Records
United States	10 September 2013	Digital download - RedOne and Alex P Remix	Capitol Records
United States	10 September 2013	Mainstream radio	Capitol Records
