= Heaven (Emeli Sandé song) =

2011 single by Emeli Sandé

Single by Emeli Sandé

from the album Our Version of Events
- B-side: "Easier in Bed" (acoustic version); "Kill the Boy" (live from Angel Studios)
- Released: 12 August 2011
- Genre: Breakbeat; gospel; trip hop
- Length: 4:12
- Label: Virgin
- Songwriters: Emeli Sandé; Shahid Khan; Harry Craze; Hugo Chegwin; Mike Spencer
- Producer: Mike Spencer

Emeli Sandé singles chronology
"Never Be Your Woman" (2010)	"Heaven" (2011)	"Read All About It" (2011)

"Heaven" is the debut solo single by Scottish singer Emeli Sandé. It was released by Virgin Records after she signed a record deal with the label after the success of single "Never Be Your Woman" which Sandé was featured as a guest artist. It was also the first release from Sandé's debut album, Our Version of Events, on 14 August 2011. The single was added to BBC Radio 1's playlist in June 2011. The song was also crowned record of the week by the station’s daytime DJ, Fearne Cotton. The single is written by Sandé, Naughty Boy, Craze, Zeus Charalambous & Hoax, with producer Mike Spencer.

Digital Spy said that the song is a mixture of pacey house beats, mellow strings (arranged by Cliff Masterson) and Mark Ronson-esque horn sections. The song was also compared to the work of Leona Lewis (whom Sandé has written tracks for) and Yasmin. One critic said that the song was "ticking all the good boxes in modern urban music." Critics also said that the song "stunned" them when they heard the song. The single was released accompanied by a music video, which was filmed in London, United Kingdom which premiered on 22 August 2011 on Emeli Sandé's official YouTube account. Throughout the video the music has scenes of Sandé singing to the sky, and standing outside of a Cathedral, there are also many shots where Mary, the mother of Jesus' statue is seen in the video. The single was released via digital download and 7" vinyl on 14 August and 15 August 2011, respectively. The single was made to pre-order several weeks before it was released on iTunes.

== Background and composition ==
"Heaven is getting on all the playlists and I’m really happy. It is on the A-list at Radio 1, which is amazing. Heaven has also topped the Shazam chart, which is based on millions of daily requests for the names of songs played on the radio and in bars and clubs."

—Emeli Sandé

"Heaven" was confirmed to be the first released as Sandé's attempt as a solo artist and the first single from Our Version of Events. She signed a joint record deal between Virgin Records and EMI Records. The deal came across after she featured on rapper Wiley's single, "Never Be Your Woman", released by Virgin Records and the single had chart-success charting at number-eight on the UK Singles Chart. Sandé had several meetings with record companies to secure a deal to release music. The song was written by Emeli Sandé herself, longtime collaborator Naughty Boy, and Craze and Hoax.

She was a medical student and studied at Glasgow University. She revealed that her education was the most important thing to her, as if her music career was to fail, she would have a career to drop back to. She revealed that her manager, Adrian Sykes waited since she was 16 to finally record a debut album. She later announced that she would begin recording her debut album once her education was completed (stating this when she was about to study her fourth year at university). After her fourth year, she passed her medical exams and she began recording her first album, with "Heaven" being picked as the lead single from the album. She announced that the single topped the Shazam charts for weeks, saying that people just want to know "what it is they are hearing, which is really exciting."

In an interview with Digital Spy Sandé discussed the background of the song; "A lot of people when they first hear it immediately think early '90s, that kind of era, strings with the 'Funky Drummer' underneath them, quite epic sounding I guess. The song was written after a very long conversation I had with [producer] Naughty Boy. We got into a very deep conversation about religion and how to be good – what we all try to do in this day and age and how difficult it is. He said, 'I guess you just have to keep your heart clean' and that sparked the whole song. It was done really quickly and we knew it was a special one as soon as it was done."

== Reception ==
=== Critical reception ===
Digital Spy said that the song is a mixture of pacey house beats, mellow strings and Ronson-esque horn sections. The song was also crowned "Record of the Week" by BBC Radio 1 playlist daytime DJ, Fearne Cotton. This Must be Pop said the single has the vocals of Leona Lewis and Yasmin's beat. They went on to say; "The track starts quite pleasantly but gets better as it goes on and gradually gets more dramatic. It's a good example of a style that's currently in vogue, but I don't see it doing any better than her competitors." Robot Pigeon said that the song "stunned" them when heard the song. Saying; "drum'n'bass meets gospel (Friday nights meet Sunday mornings) pop giant. It's a spine tingling track that showcases an enormous vocal talent while at the same time ticking all the good boxes in modern urban music." Robert Copsey of Digital Spy gave the song a positive review stating: "Judging by 'Heaven', it's a crime that she didn't put her solo career into action years ago. "Oh heaven, I wake with good intentions/ But the day it always lasts too long," she preaches over a familiar trip-hop beat with a seasoned vocal that a Robin S or Ultra Naté wouldn't cock a snook at. The result sounds like a lost club classic from the '90s, though by the time the euphoric, string-laden chorus kicks in, you'll be too busy with your fists in the air to notice."

=== Chart performance ===
The song first appeared to be having chart success after thousands pre-ordering the single on iTunes. The song debuted on the Irish Singles Chart at number forty. However, despite a low chart position in Ireland, "Heaven" debuted at number two on the UK Singles Chart with sales of 63,659. This song went on to chart at number twenty-nine in Ireland weeks later. The song also appeared at the top of the chart on the UK Dance Chart, as well as charting at number-three on the Scottish Singles Chart. After Sandé's early January 2012 appearance on the Italian X Factor final, where she sang the song with the runner-up group I Moderni, "Heaven" cracked into the top ten at number ten from number fifty on the official FIMI chart. In Denmark, the song achieved similar success after being performed by contestants in the two singing competitions X Factor and The Voice of Denmark. It subsequently debuted at peaked at number three on 17 February 2012.

== Music video ==
"It is amazing, I have had friends text or call me to say they have seen it."

—Emeli Sandé on new music video

A music video to accompany the release of "Heaven" was first released onto YouTube on 22 July 2011 at a total length of four minutes and fifteen seconds. It was confirmed that Jake Nava directed the music video for the song. Nava has previously worked with Beyoncé, Alicia Keys, Kanye West and Nicki Minaj.

The music video was filmed in Bethnal Green, London, United Kingdom. The beginning of the music video shows Sandé sitting at a window in a house, the scene later changes a number of times to different people; the people who are looking upset. As she starts singing the chorus, singing "oh heaven" it shows Sandé singing and a view of the clouds in the sky. Throughout the music video there are various shots of Sandé around different towns and places in London. There are often shots of people saying prayers, and carrying a statue of Mary and a Cross resembling heaven and God; there are also shots of Sandé standing and singing outside a cathedral.

== Live performances ==
Sandé is one of dozens of acts playing the two-day Belladrum festival, a sold out show with a capacity of 12,000. She also performed the song on Jools Holland. The song was also featured during the London 2012 opening ceremony at the end of the Digital Age section after the recognition of Tim Berners-Lee.

== Track listing ==
Digital single

1. "Heaven" – 4:12
2. "Heaven" (Instrumental) – 4:13
3. "Heaven" (Live From Angel Studios) – 3:17
4. "Easier in Bed" (Acoustic Version) (Written by Sandé & Chris Loco) – 3:14
5. "Kill the Boy" (Live From Angel Studios) (Written by Sandé) – 4:00

Digital Remixes EP

1. "Heaven" (Nu:Tone Remix) – 6:09
2. "Heaven" (We Don't Belong in Pacha Remix) – 6:25
3. "Heaven" (Mojam Remix) – 4:05
4. "Heaven" (Stripped) – 3:42

7" vinyl

1. "Heaven" – 4:14
2. "Easier in Bed" (Acoustic Version) – 3:16

== Charts and certifications ==
=== Weekly charts ===
Chart (2011–2012)	Peak position
Australian Hitseekers (ARIA)	8
Belgium (Ultratop 50 Flanders)	23
Belgium (Ultratip Bubbling Under Wallonia)	2
Denmark (Tracklisten)	3
Germany (GfK)	63
Ireland (IRMA)	29
Italy (FIMI)	10
Japan Hot 100 (Billboard)	6
Netherlands (Single Top 100)	69
Scotland Singles (OCC)	3
Spain (Promusicae)	23
UK Singles (OCC)	2
UK Dance (OCC)	1

=== Year-end charts ===
Chart (2011)	Position
UK Singles (OCC)	84
Chart (2012)	Position
UK Singles (OCC)	153

=== Certifications ===
Region	Certification	Certified units/sales
Italy (FIMI)	Gold	15,000^{*}
United Kingdom (BPI)	Platinum	600,000^{‡}
Streaming
Denmark (IFPI Danmark)	Gold	900,000^{†}
^{*} Sales figures based on certification alone.^{‡} Sales+streaming figures based on certification alone.^{†} Streaming-only figures based on certification alone.

== Release history ==
Country	Release date	Format(s)
Ireland	12 August 2011	Digital download
United Kingdom	14 August 2011	Digital download
United States	31 January 2012	Digital download

== See also ==
- List of UK Dance Chart number-one singles of 2011
- List of UK top 10 singles in 2011
