= Wonder (Naughty Boy song) =

2012 single by Naughty Boy

Single by Naughty Boy featuring Emeli Sandé

from the album Hotel Cabana and Our Version of Events
- Released: 19 October 2012
- Studio: Cabana Studios (Ealing Studios, Ealing; West London, UK)
- Genre: Dance-pop; soul; Afrobeat
- Length: 3:29
- Label: Naughty Boy; Virgin
- Songwriters: Hugo Chegwin; Harry Craze; Shahid Khan; Emeli Sandé
- Producer: Naughty Boy

Naughty Boy singles chronology
"Daddy" (2011)	"Wonder" (2012)	"La La La" (2013)

Emeli Sandé singles chronology
"My Kind of Love" (2012)	"Wonder" (2012)	"Beneath Your Beautiful" (2012)

"Wonder" is the debut single released by British record producer Naughty Boy, featuring vocals from Scottish singer and songwriter Emeli Sandé. It was released on 21 October 2012, originally slated as the lead single from Naughty Boy's debut album, Hotel Cabana. "Wonder" is also included on the American version of Sandé's debut album, and as a bonus track on the re-release of her debut album, Our Version of Events.

== Music video ==
The music video to accompany the release of "Wonder" was first released onto YouTube on 20 September 2012 at a total length of three minutes and twenty-seven seconds. The video was directed by British music video director Chris Mehling. Sandé performed the song throughout the year on her Our Version of Events tour. She also performed the song on The Tonight Show with Jay Leno on 22 August 2012, and on The Jonathan Ross Show on 20 October 2012.

== Track listing ==
Digital download
No.	Title	Length
1.	"Wonder" (featuring Emeli Sandé)	3:29
2.	"Wonder" (Kidnap Kid Remix)	3:55
3.	"Wonder" (Mojam Remix)	4:27
4.	"Wonder" (Mojam Dub)	6:01

== Credits ==
Recording

- Recorded at Cabana Studios (Ealing Studios) in Ealing; West London, UK.
- Mixed at Ninja Beat Club in Atlanta, Georgia.
- Mastered at Metropolis Mastering in London, UK.

Personnel

- Hugo Chegwin (part of Craze & Hoax) – songwriter, additional producer, recording engineer, instruments, programming
- Harry Craze (part of Craze & Hoax) – songwriter, additional producer, recording engineer, instruments, programming
- Shahid "Naughty Boy" Khan – songwriter, producer, recording engineer, instruments, programming
- Daniella Rivera – assistant mixing engineer
- Emeli Sandé – songwriter, lead vocals
- Phil Tan – mixing engineer

== Charts ==
=== Weekly charts ===
Chart (2012)	Peak position
Belgium (Ultratop 50 Flanders)	45
Belgium (Ultratip Bubbling Under Flanders)	1
Belgium (Ultratop Flanders Urban)	8
Belgium (Ultratip Bubbling Under Wallonia)	13
Euro Digital Songs (Billboard)	17
Ireland (IRMA)	8
Italy (FIMI)	56
Japan (Japan Hot 100)	54
Scotland Singles (OCC)	6
UK Singles (OCC)	10

=== Year-end charts ===
Chart (2012)	Position
UK Singles (OCC)	186

== Certification ==
Region	Certification	Certified units/sales
United Kingdom (BPI)	Silver	200,000^{‡}
^{‡} Sales+streaming figures based on certification alone.

== Release history ==
Country	Release date	Format(s)	Label
United Kingdom	19 October 2012	Digital download	Virgin Records
