= Next to Me (Emeli Sandé song) =

2012 single by Emeli Sandé

Single by Emeli Sandé

from the album Our Version of Events
- Released: 10 February 2012
- Genre: Soul
- Length: 3:16
- Label: Virgin
- Songwriters: Emeli Sandé; Hugo Chegwin; Harry Craze; Anup Paul
- Producers: Craze & Hoax; Mojam Music

Emeli Sandé singles chronology
"Daddy" (2011)	"Next to Me" (2012)	"My Kind of Love" (2012)

Music video
- "Next To Me" on YouTube

"Next to Me" is a song by Scottish recording artist Emeli Sandé. The single was first released in Ireland on 10 February 2012 as the third single from her debut studio album, Our Version of Events (2012). "Next to Me" was written by Sandé and co-written by Hugo Chegwin, Harry Craze and A. K. Paul. The recording was also produced by Craze and Chegwin.

On the week ending 23 February 2012, the track debuted at number one on the Irish Singles Chart, also topping the Scottish Singles Chart and peaking at number two on the UK Singles Chart. "Next to Me" was also the first single from the album in the US, released on 17 April 2012, and it became her first to reach the top 40 in the US Billboard Hot 100, charting at number 25. It was the 14th best-selling single of 2012 in the UK.

== Reception ==
Lewis Corner of Digital Spy gave the song a positive review stating: "Sandé insists of her morally righteous right-hand man over head-nodding beats and gospel-choir harmonies. Whether this mysterious entity is a lover, her faith or the music itself is never clarified, but one thing is for certain; if it inspires Sandé to write music of this standard, then her claims of perfection are rightly justified."

== Music video ==
A music video to accompany the release of "Next to Me" was first released onto YouTube on 18 January 2012 at a total length of 3:31.

== In popular culture ==
=== Media ===
"Next to Me" was used the Chilean commercial Top+Shoes in Almacenes Paris, and was featured in the soundtrack of Chilean soap opera Soltera otra vez (2nd season) and the Portuguese telenovela Doida Por Ti. The song was performed by Rachel Berry (Lea Michele) and her mother, Shelby Corcoran (Idina Menzel), in the 2013 Glee episode "Sweet Dreams". It was also used in video games Zumba Fitness: World Party and Dance Central Spotlight.

== Track listing ==
- Digital download
  (France, Germany and UK)
1. "Next to Me" – 3:16
- Digital download – Sadek remix
  (France only)
1. "Next to Me" (featuring Sadek) – 2:54
- Digital remixes – European EP
  (Germany, Ireland and Italy)
1. "Next to Me" (Nu:Tone Remix) – 6:06
2. "Next to Me" (Mojam Remix) – 3:51
3. "Next to Me" (Dorian Remix) – 6:30
4. "Next to Me" (Next to Me in Bed Remix) – 3:59
- Digital download – Kendrick Lamar Remix
  (UK and US)
1. "Next to Me" (featuring Kendrick Lamar) – 3:55
- Digital remixes – American EP
  (US-only)
1. "Next to Me" (MOTi Remix) – 5:48
2. "Next to Me" (James Egbert Mixshow Edit) – 4:07
3. "Next to Me" (Manhattan Clique Mixshow Edit) – 4:26
4. "Next to Me" (MOTi BrightLight Mixshow Edit) – 4:06
- Digital download – Spanglish Remix
  (Spain)
1. "Next to Me" (featuring Alejandro Sanz) – 3:17

2013 Brit Awards

1. "Clown" / "Next to Me" (Live from the BRITs) – 4:53

== Personnel ==
- Emeli Sande - lead vocals
- Craze & Hoax, James Murray, Mustafa Omer: Production, all instruments and programming (except piano and bass)
- Abeeku "Beyku" Ribeiro - backing vocals
- Anup Paul - bass guitar
- Neil Cowley - piano
- Patsy McKay, Jenny La Touche, Awsa Bergstrom, Rebecca Jones, Charlene Jones, Crystal Jones, Lorraine Barnes, John Gibbons, Jack Vasiliou, Roxy Harris - choir backing vocals

== Production ==
- Produced by Craze & Hoax for Method Music Mgmt. and Delirious Blacksmith Music Mgmt. Ltd., with additional production by Mojam Music (for Delirious Blacksmith Music Mgmt.)
- Recorded by Craze & Hoax
- Mixed by Tom Elmhirst, with assistance by Ben Baptie
- Mastered by Simon Davey
- Published by Stellar Songs Ltd./EMI Music Publishing Ltd./Naughty Words/Sony-ATV Music Publishing Ltd.

== Charts ==
=== Weekly charts ===
Weekly chart performance for "Next to Me"
Chart (2012–2013)	Peak position
Australia (ARIA)	14
Austria (Ö3 Austria Top 40)	12
Belgium (Ultratop 50 Flanders)	6
Belgium (Ultratop 50 Wallonia)	21
Canada Hot 100 (Billboard)	43
Colombia (National-Report) Spanglish Remix	8
Czech Republic Airplay (ČNS IFPI)	6
Denmark (Tracklisten)	28
Finland (Suomen virallinen lista)	4
France (SNEP)	18
Germany (GfK)	21
Hungary (Rádiós Top 40)	3
Ireland (IRMA)	1
Israel (Media Forest)	6
Italy (FIMI)	17
Italy Airplay (EarOne)	1
Netherlands (Dutch Top 40)	3
Netherlands (Single Top 100)	4
New Zealand (Recorded Music NZ)	6
Norway (VG-lista)	43
Poland (Polish Airplay Top 100)	4
Scotland Singles (OCC)	1
Spain (Promusicae)	12
Switzerland (Schweizer Hitparade)	24
UK Singles (OCC)	2
US Billboard Hot 100	25
US Adult Alternative Airplay (Billboard)	21
US Adult Contemporary (Billboard)	10
US Adult Pop Airplay (Billboard)	3
US Dance Club Songs (Billboard)	1
US Hot R&B/Hip-Hop Songs (Billboard)	7
US Pop Airplay (Billboard)	17

=== Year-end charts ===
2012 year-end chart performance for "Next to Me"
Chart (2012)	Position
Belgium (Ultratop Flanders)	32
Belgium (Ultratop Wallonia)	61
France (SNEP)	64
Germany (Media Control AG)	93
Hungary (Rádiós Top 40)	12
Italy (FIMI)	89
Italy Airplay (EarOne)	21
Netherlands (Dutch Top 40)	17
Netherlands (Single Top 100)	29
UK Singles (OCC)	14

2013 year-end chart performance for "Next to Me"
Chart (2013)	Position
Australia (ARIA)	94
Colombia (National-Report)	48
France (SNEP)	187
US Billboard Hot 100	88
US Adult Contemporary (Billboard)	31
US Adult Top 40 (Billboard)	21
US Dance Club Songs (Billboard)	1
US Hot R&B/Hip-Hop Songs (Billboard)	24

== Certifications ==
Certifications for "Next to Me"
Region	Certification	Certified units/sales
Australia (ARIA)	2× Platinum	140,000^{^}
Belgium (BRMA)	Gold	15,000^{*}
Denmark (IFPI Danmark)	Gold	45,000^{‡}
Germany (BVMI)	Gold	150,000^{‡}
Italy (FIMI)	Gold	15,000^{*}
New Zealand (RMNZ)	Gold	7,500^{*}
Switzerland (IFPI Switzerland)	Gold	15,000^{^}
United Kingdom (BPI)	2× Platinum	1,200,000^{‡}
United States (RIAA)	Platinum	1,001,000
^{*} Sales figures based on certification alone.^{^} Shipments figures based on certification alone.^{‡} Sales+streaming figures based on certification alone.

== Release history ==
Release dates for "Next to Me"
Country	Release date	Format(s)	Version(s)	Label
France	12 February 2012	Digital download	Album version	EMI Music
Germany	12 February 2012	Digital download	Album version	EMI Music
United Kingdom	12 February 2012	Digital download	Album version	Virgin Records
Ireland	20 April 2012	Digital remixes EP	Nu:Tone Remix; Mojam Remix; Dorian Remix; In Bed Remix	EMI Music
Germany	23 April 2012	Digital remixes EP	Nu:Tone Remix; Mojam Remix; Dorian Remix; In Bed Remix	EMI Music
Italy	23 April 2012	Digital remixes EP	Nu:Tone Remix; Mojam Remix; Dorian Remix; In Bed Remix	EMI Music
France	23 June 2012	Digital download	Sadek Remix	EMI Music
United Kingdom	3 March 2013	Digital download	Kendrick Lamar Remix	Virgin EMI Records
United States	3 March 2013	Digital download	Kendrick Lamar Remix	Capitol Records
United States	5 March 2013	Digital Remixes EP	MOTi Remix; James Egbert Mixshow; Manhattan Clique Mixshow; MOTi BrightLight Mixshow	Capitol Records

== See also ==
- List of number-one dance singles of 2013 (U.S.)
