= Emeli Sandé discography =

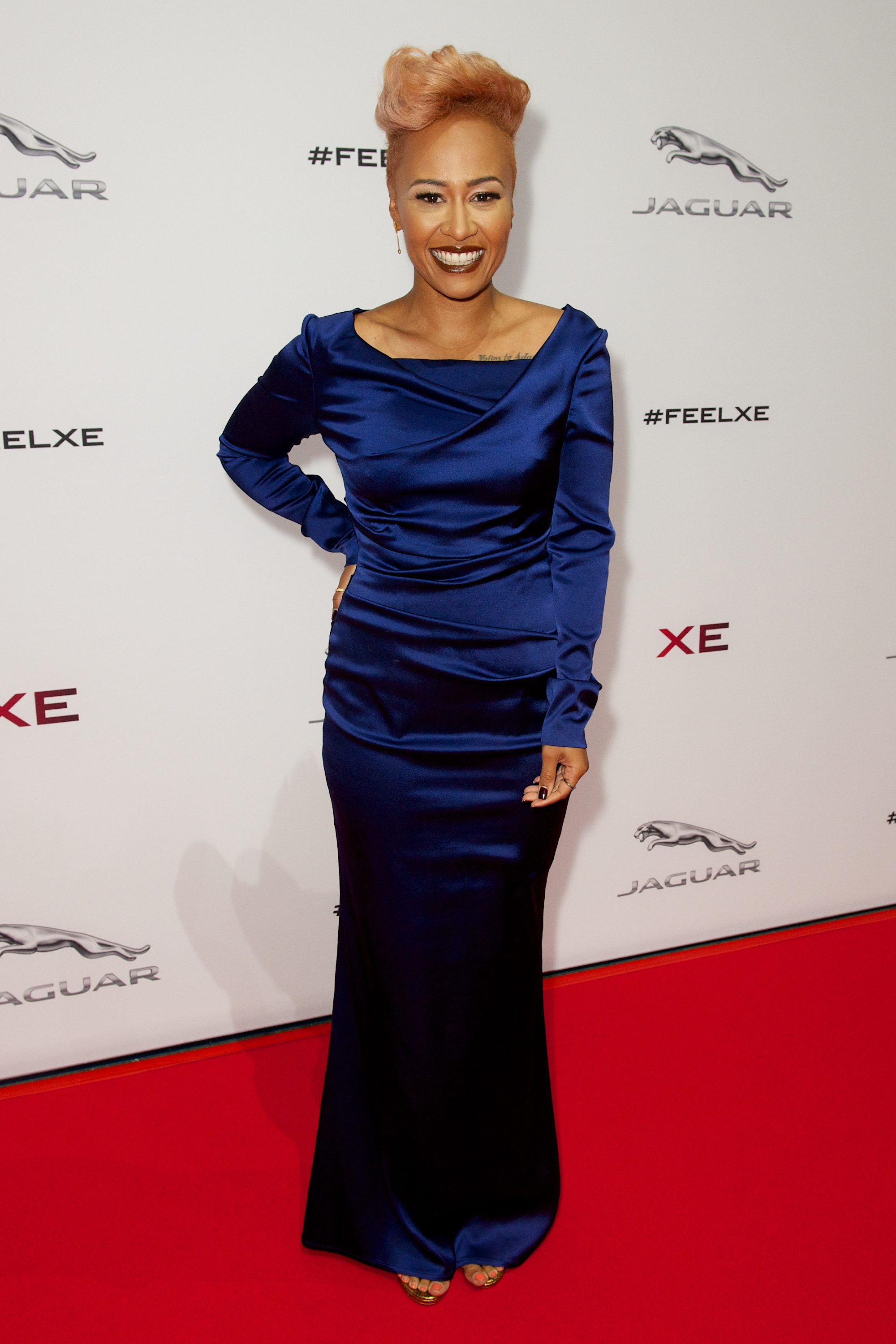
- Sandé in 2014
- Studio albums: 5
- Extended plays: 2
- Live albums: 1
- Singles: 43
- Music videos: 17

The discography of Scottish singer Emeli Sandé consists of five studio albums, forty-three singles (twenty-eight as lead artist and fifteen as a featured artist) and twenty-one music videos (seventeen as lead artist and four as a featured artist)

Sandé first became known to the public eye after she featured on rapper Chipmunk's debut single, "Diamond Rings", which gained herself and Chipmunk a top 10 single on the UK Singles Chart. In 2010, she appeared on Wiley's "Never Be Your Woman", which became another top ten hit. She has written for a number of artists, including Cher Lloyd, Susan Boyle, Preeya Kalidas, Leona Lewis, Cheryl Cole, and Tinie Tempah.

In 2010, she signed a publishing deal with EMI Music Publishing – later announcing that Virgin Records had given her a record deal. Sandé released her first solo single, "Heaven" in August 2011, where it debuted at number-two on the UK Singles Chart. The single also saw Sandé reach the top ten in the likes of Denmark and Ireland, gaining accreditation of silver status by the British Phonographic Industry and gold status by the Federation of the Italian Music Industry. The artist then went on to appear on British rapper Professor Green's single "Read All About It" (October 2011) which reached number-one in the United Kingdom, number-two in Ireland and number forty-one in Australia. Sandé released her second solo single, "Daddy" in November 2011, where it peaked at number twenty-one in the United Kingdom. A third single, "Next to Me" was then released in February 2012, peaking at number-one in Ireland and debuting at number-two in the United Kingdom. It was succeeded by the release of the singer's debut studio album, Our Version of Events, which debuted at number one in the United Kingdom – selling 113,319 copies in its first week. A fourth single, "My Kind of Love" was released in May 2012, peaking at number seventeen.

Following Sandé's performance of "Read All About It, Pt. III", a continuation of the Professor Green duet, at the 2012 Summer Olympics, the song charted at number three in the UK. A repackaged edition of Our Version of Events followed on 22 October, featuring "Wonder" a collaboration with producer Naughty Boy, which reached number ten in the UK. November 2012 also saw Sandé feature on Labrinth's single "Beneath Your Beautiful" which became her second number-one as a featured artist in the United Kingdom. The album campaign ended in January 2013 following the release of "Clown" as the album's fifth single; which peaked at number four.

== Albums ==
=== Studio albums ===
Title	Details	Peak chart positions										Sales	Certifications
Title	Details	UK	AUS	BEL (FL)	FRA	GER	IRE	NL	NZ	SWI	US	Sales	Certifications
Our Version of Events	Released: 13 February 2012; Label: EMI, Virgin; Formats: Digital download, streaming, LP, CD	1	17	3	9	7	1	3	9	6	28	UK: 2,473,253; US: 278,000	BPI: 8× Platinum; ARIA: Gold; BEA: Gold; BVMI: 3× Gold; IFPI SWI: Gold; IRMA: 3× Platinum; NVPI: Platinum; RIAA: Gold; RMNZ: Platinum; SNEP: Platinum
Long Live the Angels	Released: 11 November 2016; Label: Virgin; Formats: Digital download, streaming, LP, CD	2	20	9	65	12	6	21	29	9	41	UK: 294,338	BPI: Platinum
Real Life	Released: 13 September 2019; Label: Virgin EMI; Format: Digital download, streaming, LP, CD	6	— (Note: Real Life did not enter the ARIA Albums Chart, but peaked at number 31 on the ARIA Digital Album Chart.)	25	—	31	37	50	—	9	— (Note: Real Life did not enter the US Billboard 200, but peaked at number 79 on the US Top Current Album Sales chart.)		
Let's Say for Instance	Released: 6 May 2022; Label: Chrysalis; Format: Digital download, streaming, LP, CD	27	—	68	—	—	—	—	—	41	—		
How Were We to Know	Released: 17 November 2023; Label: Chrysalis; Format: Digital download, streaming, LP, CD	49	—	—	—	—	—	—	—	84	—		
"—" denotes a recording that did not chart or was not released in that territory.

=== Live albums ===
Title	Details	Peak chart positions							Certifications
Title	Details	UK	BEL (FL)	FRA	IRE	NLD	US	US R&B /HH	Certifications
Live at the Royal Albert Hall	Release: 18 February 2013; Label: Virgin Records; Formats: DVD, CD, digital download	1	7	33	9	24	124	21	BPI: Gold; RMNZ: Gold

== Extended plays ==
Title	Details	Peak chart positions			Sales
Title	Details	FRA	US	US R&B /HH	Sales
iTunes Session	Release: 23 April 2013; Label: Virgin Records; Formats: Digital download	162	86	12	US: 5,000
Live from London Bridge	Release: 11 November 2016; Label: Virgin Records; Formats: Digital download	—	—	—	
Kingdom Coming	Release: 3 November 2017; Label: Virgin Records; Formats: Digital download	—	—	—	
My Version of Events	Release: 16 August 2019; Label: Universal Music Catalogue; Formats: Digital download	—	—	—	
"—" denotes a recording that did not chart or was not released in that territory.

== Singles ==
=== As lead artist ===
Title	Year	Peak chart positions										Certifications	Album
Title	Year	UK	AUS	BEL (FL)	FRA	GER	IRE	NL	NZ	SWI	US	Certifications	Album
"Heaven"	2011	2	—	23	—	63	29	69	—	—	—	BPI: Platinum	Our Version of Events
"Daddy" (featuring Naughty Boy)	2011	21	—	— (Note: "Daddy" did not enter the Ultratop 50, but peaked at number eight on the Flemish Ultratip chart.)	—	—	—	—	—	—	—		Our Version of Events
"Next to Me"	2012	2	14	6	18	21	1	4	6	24	25	BPI: 2× Platinum; ARIA: 2× Platinum; BEA: Gold; IPFI SWI: Gold; RIAA: Platinum; RMNZ: Gold	Our Version of Events
"My Kind of Love"	2012	17	60	22	167	—	35	79	—	—	— (Note: "My Kind of Love" did not enter the Billboard Hot 100, but peaked at number 14 on the Bubbling Under Hot 100 Singles chart, which acts as an extension to the Hot 100.)	BPI: Gold; ARIA: Gold	Our Version of Events
"Clown"	2012	4	34	32	—	36	6	25	—	42	—	BPI: Platinum	Our Version of Events
"Hurts"	2016	22	—	28	—	—	53	—	— (Note: "Hurts" did not enter the NZ Top 40 Singles Chart, but peaked at number six on the NZ Heatseekers Singles Chart.)	40	—	BPI: Gold	Long Live the Angels
"Breathing Underwater"	2016	78	—	—	—	—	—	—	—	—	—		Long Live the Angels
"Highs & Lows"	2017	— (Note: "Highs & Lows" did not enter the UK Singles Chart, but peaked at number 68 on the UK Singles Downloads Chart.)	—	—	—	—	—	—	—	—	—		Long Live the Angels
"Starlight"	2017	—	—	—	—	—	—	—	—	—	—		Kingdom Coming
"Sparrow"	2019	— (Note: "Sparrow" did not enter the UK Singles Chart, but peaked at number 53 on the UK Singles Downloads Chart.)	—	—	—	—	—	—	—	—	—		Real Life
"Extraordinary Being"	2019	—	—	—	—	—	—	—	—	—	—		Real Life
"Shine"	2019	—	—	—	—	—	—	—	—	—	—		Real Life
"You Are Not Alone"	2019	—	—	—	—	—	—	—	—	—	—		Real Life
"One of a Kind" (with Ronan Keating)	2020	—	—	—	—	—	—	—	—	—	—		Twenty Twenty
"I'll Get There (The Other Side)" (Note: "I'll Get There (The Other Side)" was released as a standalone single for the 2020 film, Emperor.)	2020	—	—	—	—	—	—	—	—	—	—		Non-album singles
"Prayed Up"	2020	—	—	—	—	—	—	—	—	—	—		Non-album singles
"More of You" (with Stonebwoy & Nana Rogues)	2020	—	—	—	—	—	—	—	—	—	—		Non-album singles
"Intermission"	2020	—	—	—	—	—	—	—	—	—	—		Non-album singles
"Family"	2021	—	—	—	—	—	—	—	—	—	—		Let's Say for Instance
"Look What You've Done" (solo or with Jaykae)	2021	—	—	—	—	—	—	—	—	—	—		Let's Say for Instance
"Brighter Days"	2022	— (Note: "Brighter Days" did not enter the UK Singles Chart, but peaked at number 37 on the UK Singles Downloads Chart.)	—	—	—	—	—	—	—	—	—		Let's Say for Instance
"There Isn't Much"	2022	— (Note: "There Isn't Much" did not enter the UK Singles Chart, but peaked at number 27 on the UK Singles Downloads Chart.)	—	—	—	—	—	—	—	—	—		Let's Say for Instance
"When Someone Loves You" (with Nile Rodgers)	2022	—	—	—	—	—	—	—	—	—	—		Non-album single
"There for You"	2023	—	—	—	—	—	—	—	—	—	—		How Were We to Know
"How Were We to Know"	2023	—	—	—	—	—	—	—	—	—	—		How Were We to Know
"All This Love"	2023	—	—	—	—	—	—	—	—	—	—		How Were We to Know
"One of These Things First"	2023	— (Note: "One of These Things First" did not enter the UK Singles Chart, but peaked at number 8 on the UK Physical Singles Chart.)	—	—	—	—	—	—	—	—	—		The Endless Coloured Ways: The Songs of Nick Drake
"Roots"	2024	—	—	—	—	—	—	—	—	—	—		TBA
"Love Right Here" (with Parson James and Troy Miller)	2026	—	—	—	—	—	—	—	—	—	—		TBA
"—" denotes a recording that did not chart or was not released in that territory.

=== As featured artist ===
Title	Year	Peak chart positions										Certifications	Album
Title	Year	UK	AUS	BEL (FL)	GER	IRE	NL	NZ	SWE	SWI	US	Certifications	Album
"Diamond Rings" (Chipmunk featuring Emeli Sandé)	2009	6	—	—	—	—	—	—	—	—	—	BPI: Silver	I Am Chipmunk
"Never Be Your Woman" (Naughty Boy presents Wiley featuring Emeli Sandé)	2010	8	—	—	—	—	—	—	—	—	—	BPI: Silver	Non-album single
"Read All About It" (Professor Green featuring Emeli Sandé)	2011	1	34	21	80	2	—	—	—	58	—	BPI: Platinum; ARIA: Platinum	At Your Inconvenience
"Wonder" (Naughty Boy featuring Emeli Sandé)	2012	10	—	45	—	8	—	—	—	—	—	BPI: Silver	Hotel Cabana
"Beneath Your Beautiful" (Labrinth featuring Emeli Sandé)	2012	1	5	4	25	1	15	4	12	17	34	BPI: 3× Platinum; ARIA: 5× Platinum; BEA: Gold; BVMI: Gold; IPFI SWE: Platinum; IPFI SWI: Platinum; RIAA: Platinum; RMNZ: 3× Platinum	Electronic Earth
"Lifted" (Naughty Boy featuring Emeli Sandé)	2013	8	—	59	55	21	63	—	—	61	—		Hotel Cabana
"This Game Is Over" (Alejandro Sanz featuring Emeli Sandé & Jamie Foxx)	2013	—	—	—	—	—	—	—	—	—	—		La Música No Se Toca (En Vivo)
"Free" (Rudimental featuring Emeli Sandé)	2013	26	5	36	38	9	—	5	—	—	—	BPI: Silver; ARIA: 4× Platinum; RMNZ: 2x Platinum	Home
"What I Did for Love" (David Guetta featuring Emeli Sandé)	2014	6	20	24	16	12	56	—	58	37	—	BPI: Platinum; ARIA: Gold; BVMI: Gold; IPFI SWE: Gold	Listen
"I.O.U" (Wretch 32 featuring Emeli Sandé)	2016	—	—	—	—	—	—	—	—	—	—		Growing Over Life
"Bridge over Troubled Water" (as part of Artists for Grenfell)	2017	1	—	26	—	25	—	— (Note: "Bridge over Troubled Water" did not enter the NZ Top 40 Singles Chart, but peaked at number four on the NZ Heatseekers Singles Chart.)	—	28	—	BPI: Gold	Non-album single
"Love Me More" (Chase & Status featuring Emeli Sandé)	2017	—	—	—	—	—	—	—	—	—	—		Tribe
"Survive" (Don Diablo featuring Emeli Sandé and Gucci Mane)	2018	—	—	—	—	—	—	—	—	—	—		Forever
"Bungee Jumping" (Naughty Boy featuring Emeli Sandé & Rahat Fateh Ali Khan)	2018	—	—	—	—	—	—	—	—	—	—		TBA
"Saints and Shadows" (Godfather of Harlem featuring Emeli Sandé & Swizz Beatz)	2019	—	—	—	—	—	—	—	—	—	—		TBA
"—" denotes a recording that did not chart or was not released in that territory.

=== Promotional singles ===
Title	Year	Peak chart positions									Certifications	Album
Title	Year	UK	AUS	BEL (FL)	GER	IRE	NL	NZ	SWE	SWI	Certifications	Album
"Read All About It, Pt. III"	2012	3	40	26	5	5	4	38	20	3	BPI: 2× Platinum; ARIA: Gold; BEA: Gold; BVMI: Platinum; IPFI SWI: 2× Platinum; RMNZ: Platinum	Our Version of Events
"Garden" (featuring Jay Electronica and Áine Zion)	2016	— (Note: "Garden" did not enter the UK Singles Chart, but peaked at number 65 on the UK Singles Downloads Chart.)	—	—	—	—	—	—	—	—		Long Live the Angels
"Free as a Bird"	2019	—	—	—	—	—	—	—	—	—		Real Life
"Honest"	2019	—	—	—	—	—	—	—	—	—		Real Life
"Human"	2019	—	—	—	—	—	—	—	—	—		Real Life
"—" denotes a recording that did not chart or was not released in that territory.

== Other charted and certified songs ==
Title	Year	Peak chart positions		Certifications	Album
Title	Year	UK	IRE	Certifications	Album
"Abide with Me"	2012	44	63		Isles of Wonder
"Clown" / "Next to Me" (Live at the BRIT Awards)	2013	90	—		Non-album single
"Thunder" (Netsky featuring Emeli Sandé)	2016	—	—	RMNZ: Platinum	3
"—" denotes a recording that did not chart or was not released in that territory.

== Guest appearances ==
Title	Year	Other artist	Album
"Kids That Love to Dance"	2010	Professor Green	Alive Till I'm Dead
"Let Go"	2010	Tinie Tempah	Disc-Overy
"Dreamer" (Note: Despite her vocals appearing on the track "Dreamer", Emeli Sandé was not officially credited as the featured artist.)	2010	Devlin	Bud, Sweat and Beers
"Abide with Me"	2012	—N/a	Isles of Wonder
"Read All About It (Pt. III)"	2012	—N/a	A Symphony of British Music
"Here It Comes"	2013	Rick Smith	Trance Soundtrack
"More Than Anything"	2013	Rudimental	Home
"Crazy in Love" (Note: Despite The Bryan Ferry Orchestra appearing on the track "Crazy In Love", Emeli Sandé officially credited as the main artist.)	2013	The Bryan Ferry Orchestra	The Great Gatsby Soundtrack
"My Heart"	2013	Wiley & French Montana	The Ascent
"Bitch, Don't Kill My Vibe (Remix)"	2013	Kendrick Lamar	"Bitch, Don't Kill My Vibe" single
"Welcome to Cabana"	2013	Naughty Boy, Tinie Tempah	Hotel Cabana
"Pluto"	2013	Naughty Boy, Wretch 32	Hotel Cabana
"Lifted"	2013	Naughty Boy, Professor Green	Hotel Cabana
"Winter Wonderland"	2013	—N/a	The Best Man Holiday Soundtrack
"Free" (Remix)	2013	Rudimental, Nas	"Free" single
"Somebody Else"	2013	Robert Glasper	Black Radio 2
"Roses"	2013	James Arthur	James Arthur
"A Heart Can Save the World"	2013	Tinie Tempah	Demonstration
"All the Girls Love Alice"	2014	—N/a	Goodbye Yellow Brick Road: Revisited & Beyond
"Roses"	2015	Krept and Konan	The Long Way Home
"Saddest Vanilla"	2015	Jess Glynne	I Cry When I Laugh
"Thunder"	2016	Netsky	3
"Kill Your Mama"	2016	Alicia Keys	Here
"Stay Here in the Sun"	2018	TALA, Naughty Boy	TBA
"Queen"	2018	Nile Rodgers, Chic, Elton John	It's About Time
"It's Hard"	2020	Giggs	Now or Never
"Sonya"	2021	Ghetts	Conflict of Interest
"Siesta"	2022	Ezra Collective	Where I'm Meant to Be

== Music videos ==
Title	Year	Director	Reference(s)
As lead artist
"Heaven"	2011	Jake Nava	
"Daddy" (featuring Naughty Boy)	2011	AG Rojas	
"Next to Me"	2012	Chris Mehling	
"My Kind of Love"	2012	Chris Mehling	
"Clown"	2012	Chris Mehling	
"My Kind of Love" (US version)	2013	Sanji	
"Hurts"	2016	Charles Mehling	
"Breathing Underwater"	2016	—N/a	—N/a
"Garden" (featuring Jay Electronica and Áine Zion)	2016	—N/a	—N/a
"Highs & Lows"	2017	—N/a	—N/a
"Higher" (featuring Giggs)	2017	Myles Whittingham and Christopher Cargill	—N/a
"Sparrow"	2019	Sarah McColgan	
"Extraordinary Being"	2019	—N/a	—N/a
"Family"	2021	Lewis Cater	—N/a
"There for You"	2023	Iona Magnus	
"How Were We to Know"	2023	Iona Magnus and Tom Stoddart	
"All This Love	2023	Iona Magnus	—N/a
As featured artist
"Never Be Your Woman" (Wiley featuring Emeli Sandé)	2010	—N/a	—N/a
"Read All About It" (Professor Green featuring Emeli Sandé)	2011	Henry Scholfield	
"Wonder" (Naughty Boy featuring Emeli Sandé)	2012	Nadia Marquard Otzen	
"Beneath Your Beautiful" (Labrinth featuring Emeli Sandé)	2012	Sophie Muller	

== Songwriting credits ==
- "101" — co-written with Alicia Keys; recorded and released by Alicia Keys, 6:29
- "Avalon" — co-written with Stephen Manderson, Mustafa Omar, James Murray & Luke Jub; recorded and released by Professor Green & Sierra Kusterbeck, 4:45
- "Boys" — co-written with James Murray, Mustafa Omer & Shahid Khan; recorded and released by Cheryl Cole, 3:42
- "Brainwashed" — co-written with James Devlin, Pontus Hjelm & Eshraque Mughal; recorded and released by Devlin & Milena Sanchez, 3:24
- "Brand New Me" — co-written with Alicia Keys; recorded and released by Alicia Keys, 3:53
- "Find a Boy" — co-written with Shahid Khan, Aminata Kabba & Rocky Takalobighashi; recorded and released by A*M*E & Mic Righteous, 3.04
- "Half of Me" — co-written with Shahid Khan, Mikkel Eriksen & Tor Hermansen; recorded and released by Rihanna, 3:12
- "Hollywood" — co-written with Shahid Khan; recorded and released by Naughty Boy featuring Gabrielle,
- "Kids That Love to Dance" — co-written with Shahid Khan & Steven Marsden; recorded and released alongside Professor Green, 2:46
- "Kill Your Mama" — co-written with Alicia Keys; recorded and released by Alicia Keys, 2:40
- "Let Go" — co-written with Benjamin Harrison, Emile Haynie, Shahid Khan & Patrick Okogwu; recorded and released alongside Tinie Tempah, 4:18
- "Let It Rain" — co-written with Kwasi Danquah & Nathaniel Ritchie; recorded and released by Tinchy Stryder & Melanie Fiona, 3:40
- "Not Even the King" — co-written with Alicia Keys; recorded and released by Alicia Keys, 3:07
- "Radio" — co-written with Shahid Khan; recorded and released by Alesha Dixon, 3:04
- "This Will Be the Year" — co-written with Josh Kear & Shahid Khan; recorded and released by Susan Boyle, 3:53
- "Til the End" – co-written with Kwasi Danquah & Shahid Khan; recorded and released by Tinchy Stryder & Amelle Berrabah, 3:22
- "Trouble" – co-written with Hugo Chegwin, Harry Craze, Shahid Khan, Leona Lewis, Fraser T Smith; recorded and released by Leona Lewis, 3:42
- "Underdog Law" – co-written with Jermaine Scott; recorded and released alongside Wretch 32, 3:13
- Imagination – co-written with Kye Gibbon, Matthew Robson-Scott, Katy Menditta, Mustafa Omer and James Murray; recorded and released by Gorgon City and Katy Menditta, 3:37

== See also ==
- List of songs written by Emeli Sandé
