= Long Live the Angels Tour =

2017 concert tour by Emeli Sandé

- Continental tour by Emeli Sandé
- Location: Europe
- Associated album: Long Live the Angels
- Start date: 16 March 2017
- End date: 27 October 2017
- Legs: 2
- No. of shows: 30
- Website: http://www.emelisande.com/live-dates/

Emeli Sandé concert chronology
- Our Version of Events Tour (2011–13); Long Live the Angels Tour (2017)

The Long Live the Angels Tour is the second concert tour by Scottish singer Emeli Sandé. Sandé announced in November 2016 that she would embark on a European and United States tour, starting in the following March in support of her second album, Long Live the Angels. The tour consists of 40 shows, including Sandé's first arena shows, which were announced in December 2016.

Calum Scott was the opening act during the October 2017 arena leg of the tour.

== Controversy ==
Several complaints were received by Ticketmaster and Genting Arena following Sande's Birmingham gig on 25 October. The show was cut considerably short, only lasting one-hour compared to the near two-hour set at all other UK dates. The tour organisers refused to provide any refunds, and Sande herself did not comment, though it is believed vocal strain led to the incident. The original full set list was restored for the final tour date on 27 October.

== Setlist ==
This setlist is from the show on 15 October 2017 in Glasgow. It does not represent all shows for the tour.

1. "Hurts"
2. "Free"
3. "Where I Sleep"
4. "Growth" (Video Interlude)
5. "Lonely"
6. "Give Me Something"
7. "Every Single Little Piece"
8. "Journey" (Video Interlude)
9. "Kung Fu" (BV Interlude)
10. "My Kind of Love"
11. "Breathing Underwater"
12. "Happen"
13. "Rebellion" (Video Interlude)
14. "Heaven"
15. "Piece of My Heart"
16. "Clown"
17. "River"
18. "Suitcase"
19. "Starlight" (Acoustic)
20. "Beneath Your Beautiful"
21. "Read All About It, Pt. III"
22. "Wonder"
23. "Babe"
24. "Highs & Lows"
25. "Next to Me"

Encore

27. "Little Bit Longer"

== Shows ==
Date	City	Country	Venue
Europe
16 March 2017	Edinburgh	Scotland	Usher Hall
18 March 2017	Dublin	Ireland	Olympia Hall
19 March 2017	Birmingham	United Kingdom	o2 Academy
21 March 2017	London	United Kingdom	o2 Academy
22 March 2017	Leeds	United Kingdom	o2 Academy
24 March 2017	Antwerp	Belgium	Lotto Arena
25 March 2017	Luxembourg	Luxembourg	Rockhal
27 March 2017	Paris	France	Zénith de Paris
28 March 2017	Munich	Germany	Zenith
29 March 2017	Amsterdam	Netherlands	Heineken Music Hall
1 April 2017	Zürich	Switzerland	Samsung Hall
3 April 2017	Berlin	Germany	Columbiahalle
4 April 2017	Cologne	Germany	Palladium
5 April 2017	Milan	Italy	Fabrique
12 April 2017	Paris	France	Zénith de Paris
27 May 2017	Hull	United Kingdom	Burton Constable Hall
16 June 2017	Bergen	Norway	Bergenhus Festning
25 June 2017	Pilton	United Kingdom	Worthy Farm
29 June 2017	Nibe	Denmark	Skalskoven
19 August 2017	Stafford	United Kingdom	Weston Park
20 August 2017	Chelmsford	United Kingdom	Hylands Park
United Kingdom & Ireland Arena Tour
14 October 2017	Aberdeen	Scotland	Oil & Gas Arena
15 October 2017	Glasgow	Scotland	The SSE Hydro
16 October 2017	Newcastle	England	Metro Radio Arena
18 October 2017	London	England	The O_{2} Arena
19 October 2017	Brighton	England	Brighton Centre
21 October 2017	Cardiff	Wales	Motorpoint Arena
22 October 2017	Manchester	England	Manchester Arena
24 October 2017	Leeds	England	First Direct Arena
25 October 2017	Birmingham	England	Genting Arena
27 October 2017	Dublin	Ireland	3Arena
