= Towie, Aberdeenshire =

Hamlet in Aberdeenshire, Scotland

Coordinates: 57°12′0″N 2°56′7″W

Towie
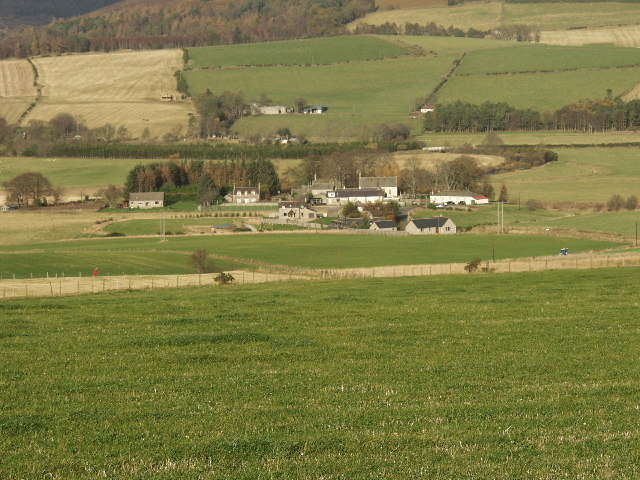

- Location within Aberdeenshire
- Council area: Aberdeenshire
- Lieutenancy area: Aberdeen
- Country: Scotland
- Sovereign state: United Kingdom
- Post town: ALFORD
- Postcode district: AB33
- Police: Scotland
- Fire: Scottish
- Ambulance: Scottish
- UK Parliament: West Aberdeenshire and Kincardine
- Scottish Parliament: Aberdeen South and North Kincardine

Towie is a small hamlet and civil parish in Aberdeenshire, Scotland, close to Alford and Lumsden, on the River Don.

One of the most notable features of Towie is its small primary school with nursery, which is located in the village itself. As of September 2011, it had 22 pupils, before moving up to attend the Alford Academy.

In 1979 the telephone exchange at Glenkindie, just north of Towie, became the UK's first digital telephone exchange. As part of general developments towards digital telephony, small rural exchanges of this size were seen as candidates for solid-state exchanges as they might be more reliable than the previous electromechanical Strowger exchanges.

== Notable people ==
- William Augustine Duncan (1811–1885), journalist, and Antipodean colonial official.
- Major James Leith (VC) (1826–1869), buried in the churchyard.
- Sir William MacGregor (1846–1919), a medical doctor, and the governor of several British colonies including Newfoundland (1904–1909) and Queensland (1909–1914). He was born at Hillockhead in the parish, and after his death, buried with his parents in the village's churchyard.

== See also ==
- List of listed buildings in Towie
