= Frederick Evans (Royal Navy officer) =

Officer of the Royal Navy and hydrographer

Captain Sir Frederick Evans KCB FRS FRAS FRGS
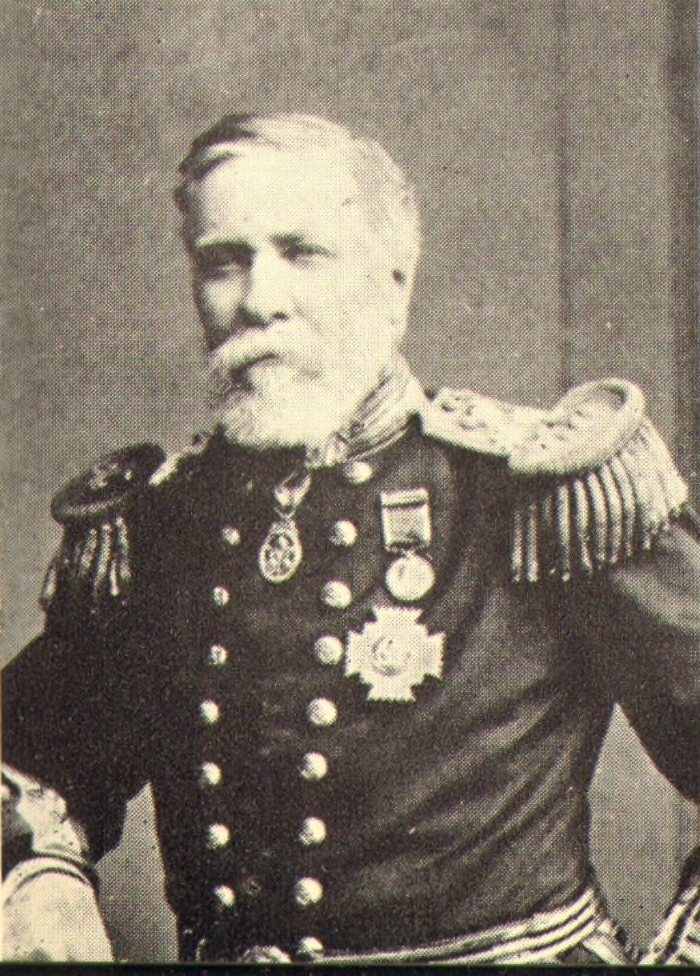
- Born: Frederick John Owen Evans; 9 March 1815; Southsea, Hampshire, England
- Died: 20 December 1885 (aged 70); Kensington, London
- Occupation: Hydrographer of the Navy
- Known for: Studies on magnetism
- Military status
- Allegiance: United Kingdom of Great Britain and Ireland
- Branch: Royal Navy
- Service years: 1828–1885
- Rank: Captain
- Awards: Knight Commander of the Order of the Bath

Sir Frederick John Owen Evans KCB FRS FRAS FRGS (9 March 1815 – 20 December 1885) was an officer of the Royal Navy. He became a distinguished hydrographer during his career and served as Hydrographer of the Navy.

== Biography ==
Evans, son of John Evans, a master in the Royal Navy, was born on 9 March 1815. He entered the navy as a second-class volunteer in 1828. After serving in HMS Rose and HMS Winchester he was transferred in 1833 to HMS Thunder, under Captain Richard Owen, and spent three years in surveying the coasts of Central America, the Demerara River, and the Bahama Banks. Evans subsequently served in the Mediterranean on board HMS Caledonia, the flagship of the Mediterranean Fleet, and then on HMS Asia, HMS Rapid, HMS Rolla, HMS Dido, and HMS Wolverine, passing through the different ranks of the 'master's' line, the officers then charged with the duties of navigation. In 1841 Evans was appointed master of HMS Fly, and for the next five years he was employed in surveying the Coral Sea, the Great Barrier Reef of Australia, and Torres Straits. Joseph Jukes, the geologist, was on board the Fly, and wrote an account of the expedition.

After a short spell of duty in the Isle of Man, Evans returned, in 1847, in HMS Acheron, under Admiral Stokes, to New Zealand, where he was engaged for four years in surveying the Middle and South Islands. During the Crimean War he served in the Baltic Sea, receiving the special thanks of Sir Charles Napier for his share in piloting the fleet through Åland.

By this time Evans had become known for his scientific abilities, and in particular for his work on magnetism. He understood the need for studies of the effects of magnetic materials on ships' compasses at a period when the Navy was being revolutionised by the shift from wooden to iron construction. He had already done considerable work on this problem in the years between 1842 and 1851. In 1855 he was appointed superintendent of the compass department of the navy, and was able to devote himself entirely to the problems of the use of the magnetic compass in iron ships and armour-clads. Evans, in co-operation with Archibald Smith, accomplished the task satisfactorily. He contributed five papers, all dealing with the magnetism of ships, to the Philosophical Transactions of the Royal Society, of which he was elected a fellow in 1862.

Evans was commissioned a staff-commander in 1863, staff-captain in 1867, and full captain in 1872. In 1865 he was appointed Chief Assistant to the Hydrographer to the Admiralty, Captain George Henry Richards, while continuing to the head of the magnetic department. In 1874 he succeeded Richards as Hydrographer, a post he held until 1884. In this position he was responsible for the charts, pilot guides and other publications of the Admiralty.

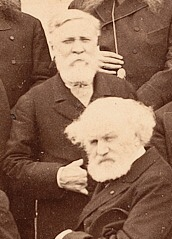
Evans (top) and Pierre Janssen at the International Meridian Conference

He was invested as a Companion of the Order of the Bath in May 1873, and promoted to Knight Commander of the same order in the 1881 Birthday Honours. He was vice-president of the Royal Geographical Society from 1879 to 1881, and president of the geographical section of the British Association in 1876. After resigning the post of hydrographer, Evans was appointed one of the British delegates to the International Meridian Conference held at Washington, D.C., in 1885, to fix a prime meridian and universal day.

He died at his residence, 21 Dawson Place, Pembridge Square, London, on 20 December 1885. He had married, on 12 November 1846, Elizabeth Mary, eldest daughter of Captain Charles Hall, R.N., of Plymouth.

== Published work ==
Evans' chart of the curves of equal magnetic variation, published 1859

Following the survey work in New Zealand in Acheron, and the subsequent work by Commander Byron Drury in HMS Pandora, Richards and Evans published the 'New Zealand Pilot' in 1856. This went through a number of editions, the fourth appearing in 1875. In 1858 Evans prepared a 'Chart of Curves of Equal Magnetic Variation,’ which was published by the Admiralty. In 1860 he wrote a valuable 'Report on Compass Deviations in the Royal Navy'. This treated of the magnetic character of the various iron ships in the navy, and also of the SS Great Eastern, and was his first work to be published in the Philosophical Transactions of the Royal Society. His most important work was the 'Admiralty Manual for Deviations of the Compass,’ of which Smith and himself were joint editors (1st ed. 1862, 2nd ed. 1863, 3rd ed. 1869). A simple account of the same subject was issued by Evans in 1870 as an 'Elementary Manual for Deviations of the Compass.' These have become standard textbooks, having been translated and adopted by all the great maritime nations.

His published work in the Philosophical Transactions of the Royal Society appeared between 1860–1872. Subsequently, Evans devoted much attention to terrestrial magnetism. He compiled the magnetical instructions for the observers on board HMS Challenger in 1872, and delivered a lecture on the 'Magnetism of the Earth' to the Royal Geographical Society in 1878. In 1881 he contributed a paper to the British Association on 'Oceanic or Maritime Discovery from 1831 to 1881.'

== Commemoration ==
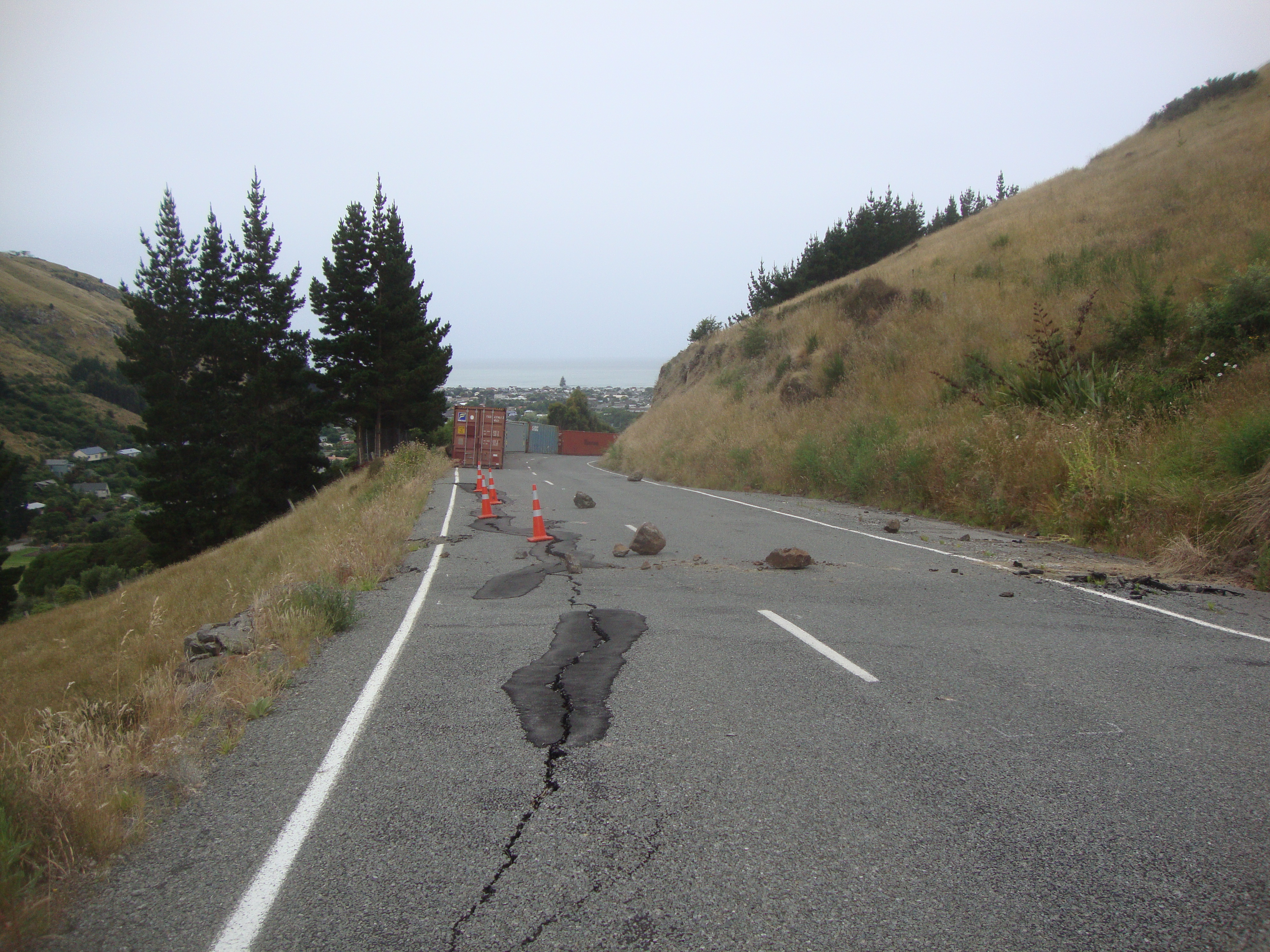
Evans Pass Road below Evans Pass, with damage from the 2011 Christchurch earthquake

While undertaking the survey on the Acheron, Evans pointed out the pass that now connects Sumner and Lyttelton. This pass is now known as Tapuwaeharuru / Evans Pass. Nearby, on Banks Peninsula, Mount Evans is also named after Evans. In Kaikiekie / Bradshaw Sound in Fiordland, it is likely that Evans Head is named after Evans.

== List of publications ==
=== Philosophical Transactions of the Royal Society ===
- Evans, Frederick J. (1860). "Reduction and Discussion of the Deviations of the Compass Observed on Board of All the Iron-Built Ships, and a Selection of the Wood-Built Steam-Ships in Her Majesty's Navy, and the Iron Steam-Ship 'Great Eastern'; Being a Report to the Hydrographer of the Admiralty". Philosophical Transactions of the Royal Society of London. 150: 337–338. doi:10.1098/rstl.1860.0021. JSTOR 108776.
- Smith, Archibald; Evans, Frederick J. (1861). "On the Effect Produced on the Deviations of the Compass by the Length and Arrangement of the Compass-Needles; and on a New Mode of Correcting the Quadrantal Deviation". Philosophical Transactions of the Royal Society of London. 151: 161–181. doi:10.1098/rstl.1861.0010. JSTOR 108732.
- Evans, Frederick J.; Smith, Archibald (1865). "On the magnetic character of the armour-plated ships of the royal navy, and on the effect on the compass of particular arrangements of iron in a ship". Philosophical Transactions of the Royal Society of London. 155: 263–323. doi:10.1098/rstl.1865.0005.
- Evans, Frederick J. (1868). "On the Amount and Changes of the Polar Magnetism at Certain Positions in Her Majesty's Iron-Built and Armour-Plated Ship 'Northumberland'". Philosophical Transactions of the Royal Society of London. 158: 487–503. doi:10.1098/rstl.1868.0020. JSTOR 108923.
- Evans, Frederick J. (1872). "On the present amount of westerly magnetic declination [variation of the compass] on the coast of Great Britain, and its annual changes". Philosophical Transactions of the Royal Society of London. 162: 319–330. doi:10.1098/rstl.1872.0014.

=== Other publications ===
- Richards, G.H.; Evans, F.J. (1856). The New Zealand Pilot. London: Hydrographic Office, Admiralty.. Full text of the fourth edition (1875) available at The Internet Archive
- Evans, Frederick J. (1859). Chart of the curves of equal magnetic variation. London: Hydrographic Office, Admiralty.
- Evans, F.J.; Smith, Archibald (1869). Admiralty Manual for the Deviations of the Compass (Third ed.). London: Hydrographic Office, Admiralty.
- Evans, F.J. (1870). Elementary Manual for the Deviations of the Compass in Iron Ships. London: J.D. Potter.
- Evans, F.J. (1878). "The Magnetism of the Earth. A Lecture on the Distribution and Direction of the Earth's Magnetic Force at the Present Time: The Changes in Its Elements, and on Our Knowledge of the Causes". Proceedings of the Royal Geographical Society. 22 (3): 188–216. doi:10.2307/1799901. JSTOR 1799901.
