= George Scougall Macbean =

- Born: Missing required parameter 1=month! 1824
- Died: 10 January 1903 (aged 78–79); Bishopstoke, Hampshire
- Military career
- Allegiance: United Kingdom
- Branch: British Indian Army
- Rank: General
- Unit: Bengal Army
- Awards: Companion of the Order of the Bath

General George Scougall Macbean CB (1824– 10 January 1903) was a senior officer in the British Indian Army.

== Biography ==
Macbean was born in 1824, the second son of Colonel Forbes Macbean, Royal Artillery, of the Old Hall, Yorkshire

He joined the Bengal Army in 1843, and served for 40 years in British India. In 1853 he served with the force against the Boree Afridis on the Indian North-West Frontier.

As a captain, he took part in heavy fighting during the Indian Rebellion of 1857. He took part in the advance force from Allahabad in June 1857, and served under Sir Henry Havelock´s force from its formation the following month. With this force he was present at the actions of Futtephore, Aoung, Panda Nudee, Cawnpore, Oonao, Buseorutgange, Boorbeake-Chowkee, Bithoor, Mungarwar, and Alumbaugh, the relief of the garrison at Lucknow, and the defence of the Residency. He then took part in the subsequent siege and capture of Lucknow, the affairs of Rooyah and Allygunge, the Rohilkhand campaign, and the recapture of Bareilly. For his service in these campaigns, he was mentioned in despatches, was thanked by the then Government of India, and received a brevet promotion to the rank of major.

During the Second Anglo-Afghan War 1878–1880, Macbean acted as deputy commissary-general with the Khaibar and Koorum Valley forces. He was appointed a Companion of the Order of the Bath (CB) in the 1881 Birthday Honours.

Macbean was promoted full general on 1 April 1894, one of a large group of Indian Staff officers so promoted on the supernumerary list.

He died at his residence Oak Grove, Bishopstoke, Hampshire on 10 January 1903.

== Family ==
Macbean married, in 1875, Bertha Violet Lowe, third daughter of Stanley Lowe, of Whitehall, Devon, and widow of Colonel Sir William West Turner, CB.
