= William Augustine Duncan =

Scottish journalist (1811–1885)

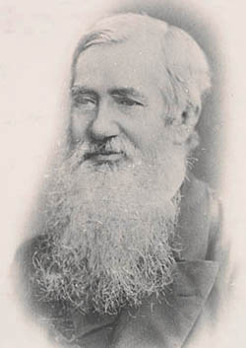
- Born: 12 March 1811; Bluefield, Towie
- Died: 1885 (aged 73–74)

William Augustine Duncan CMG (12 March 1811 – 1885) was a Scottish journalist, and colonial official.

== Life ==
He was a native of Aberdeenshire, was born on 12 March 1811 at Bluefield, Towie, and educated for the Scottish national church. He subsequently embraced Catholicism, was accepted as a student at the Scots Benedictine College, Ratisbon, and afterwards at the new college at Blairs, Kincardineshire, but having offended the authorities there by too outspoken criticism on a sermon, he gave up all thoughts of entering the priesthood.

He started publishing and bookselling business in Aberdeen, after five years he was poorer than when he began. He then resorted to teaching and to writing for the press, and was an earnest advocate of the Reform Bill of 1832 and of Lord Stanley's Irish education scheme.

In July 1838, Duncan went out to New South Wales, becoming a publisher in Sydney. The following year, he was appointed editor of a newly established Roman Catholic journal, the Australasian Chronicle and used the journal to comment on many matters of controversy. On relinquishing this post in 1843, he issued a paper of his own, Duncan's Weekly Register of Politics, Facts, and General Literature.

In 1846, he was appointed by Sir George Gipps sub-collector of customs at Moreton Bay, and soon after settling at Brisbane he was placed on the commission of the peace, made water police magistrate, guardian of minors, and local immigration commissioner. He was the first president of the Brisbane School of Arts.

In January 1859, he succeeded Colonel Gibbes as collector of customs for New South Wales, which appointment he held until 1881. On his return to Sydney, after thirteen years' absence, he declined the chairmanship of the National Board of Education; but afterwards accepted an ordinary seat at the board, of which he remained a prominent member until its dissolution. Duncan was afterwards on the council of education, and was also chairman of the free public library.

He built up a private library of 3,200 books. They were on a wide range of subjects and reflected his broad interests.

For his services to the colony he was awarded the distinction of C.M.G. in the 1881 Birthday Honours, together with a pension from the colonial government. He died in 1885.

== Works ==
Duncan, whose acquaintance with modern languages was unusually extensive, translated from the Spanish of Pedro Fernandes de Queiros an Account of a Memorial presented to his Majesty Philip III., king of Spain, concerning the Population and Discovery of the Fourth Part of the World, Australia the unknown, its great Riches and Fertility, printed anno 1610, Spanish and English, octavo, Sydney, 1874, to which he appended an introductory notice. He was the author of A Plea for the New South Wales Constitution, octavo, Sydney, 1856, of pamphlets on education, and an unpublished history of the colony until the government of Sir George Gipps.
