= 1881 Birthday Honours =

National awards given by Queen Victoria

The 1881 Birthday Honours were appointments by Queen Victoria to various orders and honours to reward and highlight good works by citizens of the British Empire. The appointments were made to celebrate the official birthday of the Queen, and were published in The London Gazette on 24 May 1881 and 27 May 1881.

The recipients of honours are displayed here as they were styled before their new honour, and arranged by honour, with classes (Knight, Knight Grand Cross, etc.) and then divisions (Military, Civil, etc.) as appropriate.

== United Kingdom and British Empire ==
=== The Most Honourable Order of the Bath ===
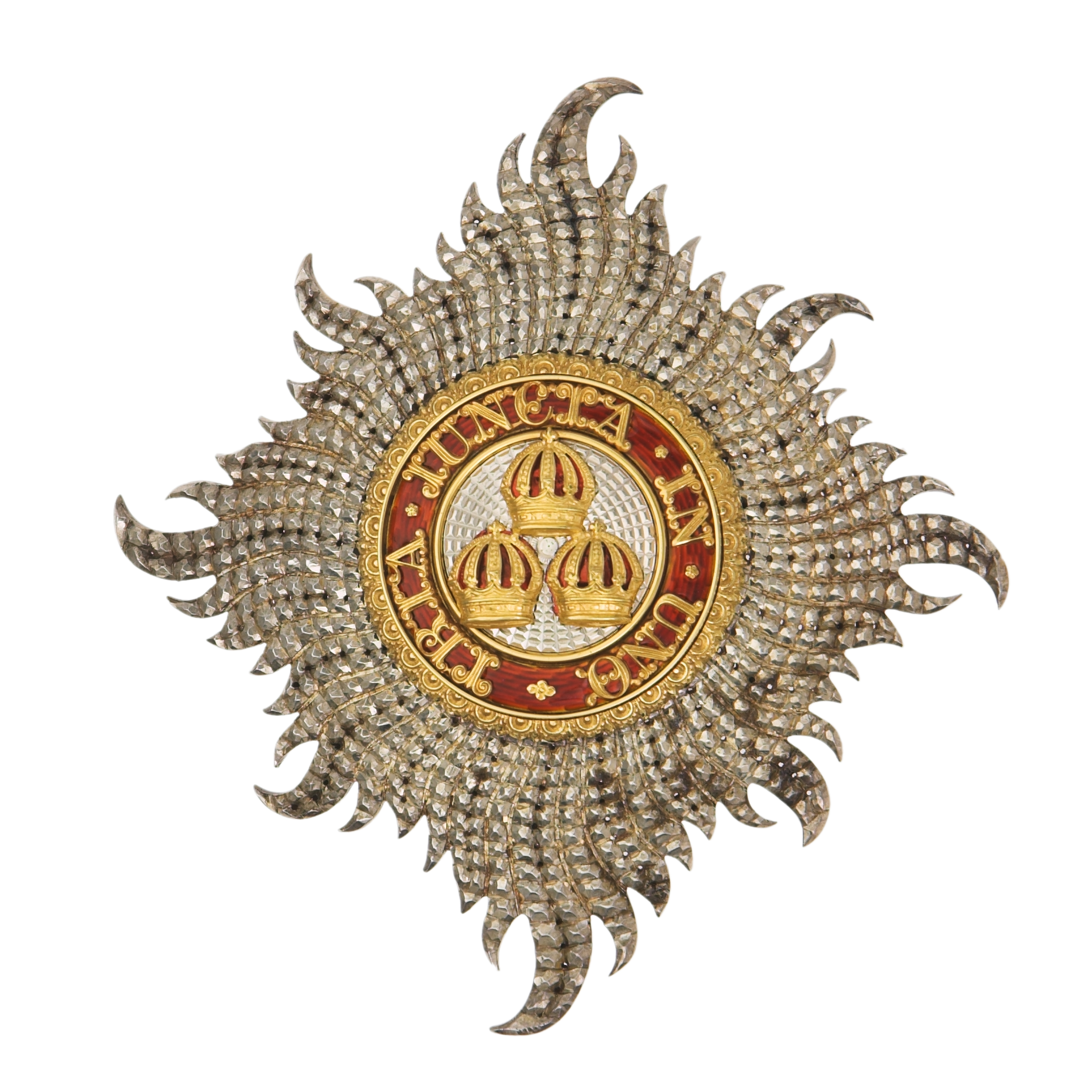
Civilian star of the Knight Grand Cross of the Order of the Bath

==== Knight Grand Cross of the Order of the Bath (GCB) ====
===== Military Division =====
Royal Navy

- Vice-Admiral Sir Frederick Beauchamp Paget Seymour

Army

- General the Earl of Longford

==== Knight Commander of the Order of the Bath (KCB) ====
===== Military Division =====
Royal Navy

- Admiral the Honourable Charles Gilbert John Brydone Elliot CB
- Admiral Edward Gennys Fanshawe CB
- Vice-Admiral the Right Honourable Lord John Hay CB
- Captain Frederick William Richards CB

Army

- General George Colt Langley CB
- General William Montagu Scott McMurdo CB
- General Lord Mark Kerr CB
- General His Serene Highness Prince Edward of Saxe-Weimar CB
- General John Thornton Grant CB
- Lieutenant-General George Vaughan Maxwell CB
- Lieutenant-General Alexander Macdonell CB
- Lieutenant-General Charles Pyndar Beauchamp Walker CB
- Lieutenant-General John Forbes CB
- Honorary Major-General John Coke CB
- Colonel Charles George Arbuthnot CB
- Colonel Charles Cooper Johnson CB Bengal Staff Corps

===== Civil Division =====
- Lieutenant-Colonel and Honorary Colonel William Fitzwilliam Lenox-Conyngham, Londonderry Militia
- Lieutenant-Colonel and Honorary Colonel Hambleton Francis Custance, West Norfolk Militia
- Lieutenant-Colonel Viscount Ranelagh, 2nd (South) Middlesex Rifle Volunteer Corps
- Lieutenant-Colonel Robert Loyd-Lindsay VC First Berkshire Rifle Volunteer Corps
- Thomas Brassey, Honorary Commander of the Liverpool Brigade of Royal Naval Artillery Volunteers
- Captain Frederick John Owen Evans CB
- Alfred Comyn Lyall CB

==== Companion of the Order of the Bath (CB) ====
===== Military Division =====
Royal Navy

- Vice-Admiral Richard Dunning White
- Vice-Admiral Edward Bridges Rice
- Captain Sholto Douglas
- Captain William Arthur
- Deputy Inspector-General of Hospitals and Fleets Daniel John Duigan

Army

- Lieutenant-General Joseph Henry Laye
- Major-General Francis Peyton
- Major-General John Henry Ford Elkington
- Major-General James Gubbins
- Major-General John Gordon
- Major-General George Godfrey Pearse
- Colonel Reginald Gipps, Scots Guards
- Colonel George Byng Harman, late Brigade Depot
- Colonel Allen Bayard Johnson, Bengal Staff Corps
- Colonel John Alexander Mathew Macdonald, Bombay Staff Corps
- Colonel George Scougall Macbean, Bengal Staff Corps
- Colonel Robert Crosse Stewart, late 2nd Foot
- Colonel Frederick Dobson Middleton, late 29th Foot
- Colonel the Honourable James Charlemagne Dormer, late 13th Foot
- Colonel Rowley Sale Hill, Bengal Infantry
- Colonel Charles Edward Cumberland, Royal Engineers
- Colonel William French, Royal Artillery
- Colonel John William Hoggan, Bengal Staff Corps
- Colonel Thomas Gaily Ross, Bengal Staff Corps
- Lieutenant-Colonel Frederick Macnaghten Armstrong, Bengal Staff Corps
- Lieutenant-Colonel Dawson Stockley Warren, 14th Regiment
- Lieutenant-Colonel Edward Donald Malcolm, Royal Engineers
- Lieutenant-Colonel Alexander Copland, Bengal Staff Corps
- Lieutenant-Colonel Cromer Ashburnham, 60th Regiment
- Lieutenant-Colonel Henry Augustus Bushman, 9th Lancers
- Lieutenant-Colonel Charles Montizambert Stockwell, 72nd Regiment
- Lieutenant-Colonel John Frederick Crease, Royal Marine Artillery
- Major Joseph Philips, Royal Marine Light Infantry
- Major John Ramsay Slade, Royal Artillery
- Deputy Surgeon-General John O'Nial, Army Medical Department
- Surgeon-Major Samuel Black Roe Army Medical Department
- Deputy Commissary-General Henry John Brownrigg, Commissariat and Transport Staff
- Assistant Commissary-General Henry Spencer Edward Reeves, Commissariat and Transport Staff

===== Civil Division =====
- Colonel Lord Hatherton, the (King's Own) 2nd Stafford Militia
- Lieutenant-Colonel and Honorary Colonel Samuel Brise Ruggles-Brise, West Essex Militia
- Lieutenant-Colonel and Honorary Colonel David Carrick Robert Carrick Buchanan, 2nd Royal Lanark Militia
- Lieutenant-Colonel and Honorary Colonel John Williams Wallington, Royal North Gloucester Militia
- Lieutenant-Colonel and Honorary Colonel Sir John Stephen Robinson Bt Louth Militia
- Lieutenant-Colonel and Honorary Colonel Sir Thomas Oriel Forster Bt Monaghan Militia
- Lieutenant-Colonel Frederick Winn Knight, 1st Worcester Rifle Volunteer Corps
- Lieutenant-Colonel David Davidson, 1st (The Queen's City of Edinburgh Rifle Volunteer Brigade)
- Lieutenant-Colonel Sir Charles Watkin Shakerley Bt 5th Cheshire Rifle Volunteer Corps
- Lieutenant-Colonel Sir Walter Barttelot Barttelot Bt 2nd Sussex Rifle Volunteer Corps
- Lieutenant-Colonel the Honourable Charles Hugh Lindsay, 6th Middlesex (St. George's) Rifle Volunteer Corps
- Lieutenant-Colonel and Vice-Admiral Thomas Chaloner, 1st North Riding of Yorkshire Artillery Volunteer Corps
- Lieutenant-Colonel Ewen Macpherson, 1st Inverness (Highland) Rifle Volunteer Corps
- Lieutenant-Colonel Addison Potter, 1st Northumberland and Durham Artillery Volunteer Corps
- Lieutenant-Colonel Henry Sagar Hirst, 3rd West Riding of Yorkshire Rifle Volunteer Corps
- Lieutenant-Colonel and Honorary Colonel Sir James Bourne Bt Royal Lancashire Artillery Militia
- Lieutenant-Colonel Sir Henry Edwards Bt 2nd West Riding of Yorkshire Yeomanry Cavalry
- Lieutenant-Colonel Sir Henry Wilmot Bt VC 1st Derbyshire Rifle Volunteer Corps
- Lieutenant-Colonel Robert John Tilney, 5th Lancashire Rifle Volunteer Corps
- Lieutenant-Colonel Edward Stock Hill, 1st Glamorgan Artillery Volunteer Corps
- Lieutenant-Colonel Donald Matheson, 1st Lanarkshire Engineer Volunteer Corps
- Lieutenant-Colonel and Honorary Colonel Leopold George Frederick Keane, Waterford Artillery, Militia
- Sir Allen William Young, Commanding the London Brigade of the Royal Naval Artillery Volunteers
- Ernest Hobart Inman, Commanding the Liverpool Brigade of the Royal Naval Artillery Volunteers
- Charles Lister Ryan, Assistant Comptroller and Auditor-General
- Frederick James Fegen, Paymaster in the Royal Navy
- Captain Andrew Noble, late Royal Artillery

=== The Most Exalted Order of the Star of India ===
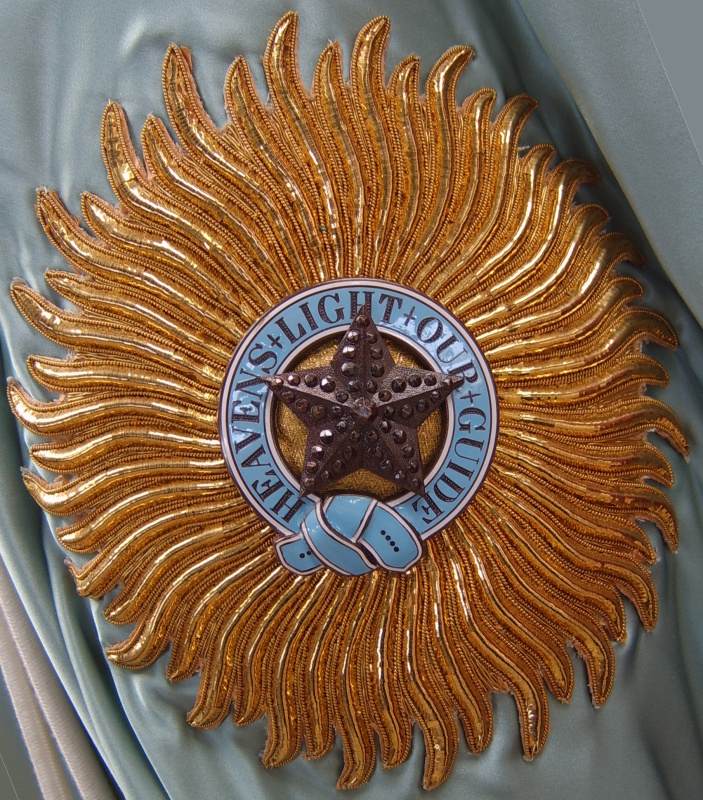
Star of a Knight Grand Commander of the Most Exalted Order of the Star of India

==== Knight Grand Commander (GCSI) ====
- His Highness Sujjun Singh, Maharana of Udaipur

==== Knight Commander (KCSI) ====
- General Orfeur Cavenagh, Bengal Staff Corps
- Charles Umpherston Aitchison CSI Bengal Civil Service, Chief Commissioner British Burmah
- His Highness Tukht Singh, Thakur Saheb of Bhavnagur
- James Davidson Gordon CSI Bengal Civil Service, Resident at Mysore
- John Forsyth CB Inspector-General of Hospitals (Retired), Bengal Medical Service
- Lepel Henry Griffin CSI Bengal Civil Service, Agent to the Governor-General in Central India

==== Companion (CSI) ====
- Donald Campbell Macnabb, Bengal Civil Service (Retired), late Commissioner Punjab
- Wazirzadah Muhammad Afzal Khan, late Political Assistant in Afghanistan
- Major-General John Salusbury Trevor (Retired), Royal (late Bombay) Engineers, lately Director-General of State Railways
- Horace Abel Cockerell, Bengal Civil Service, Secretary to the Government of Bengal, in the Judicial and Political Department
- Colonel Samuel Black, Bengal Staff Corps, Secretary to the Government of the Punjab in the Military Department

=== The Most Distinguished Order of Saint Michael and Saint George ===
Star of the Order of Saint Michael and Saint George

==== Knight Grand Cross of the Order of St Michael and St George (GCMG) ====
- Sir Arthur Edward Kennedy KCMG CB Governor and Commander-in-Chief of the Colony of Queensland
- Major-General Sir Harry St George Ord KCMG CB Royal Engineers

==== Knight Commander of the Order of St Michael and St George (KCMG) ====
- Lieutenant-General John Summerfield Hawkins RE formerly employed on the North American Boundary Commission
- Lieutenant-Colonel Charles William Wilson RE CB Consul-General in Anatolia
- Sir Francis Dillon Bell Kt Agent-General in England for New Zealand, and late Speaker of the House of Representatives in that Colony
- George Berkeley CMG Governor and Commander-in-Chief of the Leeward Islands
- Hector-Louis Langevin CB QC Minister of Public Works in the Dominion of Canada
- Major-General George Richards Greaves CB late Chief Secretary and Chief of the Staff in Cyprus
- Arthur Hunter Palmer Colonial Secretary, and lately Premier of Queensland

==== Companion of the Order of St Michael and St George (CMG) ====
- George Edward March, late Superintendent of the Treaty Department, Foreign Office
- Captain John Donald Hamill Stewart, Vice-Consul in Anatolia
- Halliday Macartney MD, English Secretary to the Chinese Legation
- Augustus Frederick Gore, Lieutenant-Governor of the Island of Saint Vincent
- Major-General James Robert Mann, Royal Engineers, Director of Roads and Surveyor-General, Jamaica
- William Warren Streeten, Chief Justice of the West Africa Settlements
- Malcolm Fraser, Surveyor-General and Commissioner of Crown Lands, of Western Australia
- William Henry Marsh, Colonial Secretary and Auditor-General, Hong Kong
- Major John George Dartnell, Commandant of the Natal Mounted Police
- John William Dawson Principal and Vice-Chancellor of the McGill University, Montreal, Canada
- Alpheus Todd Librarian to the Parliament of the Dominion of Canada
- William Dealtry, late Chief Clerk of the Colonial Office
- Charles John Irving, Resident Councillor at Malacca, Straits Settlements
- Henry Nicholas Duverger Beyts, Receiver-General of Mauritius
- William Augustine Duncan, Collector of Customs, New South Wales
- Charles Bruce, Director of Public Instruction, Ceylon
- William MacGregor Chief Medical Officer and Receiver-General, Fiji
