= Highs & Lows =

Single by Emeli Sandé

from the album Long Live the Angels
- Released: 7 March 2017
- Studio: Angelic Studios (Banbury, UK)
- Length: 3:14
- Label: Virgin EMI
- Songwriters: Adele Sandé; Tom Barnes; Peter Kelleher; Ben Kohn; Wayne Hector
- Producer: TMS

Emeli Sandé singles chronology
"Breathing Underwater" (2016)	"Highs & Lows" (2017)	"Starlight" (2017)

"Highs & Lows" is a song by Scottish singer Emeli Sandé, recorded for her second studio album Long Live the Angels (2016). It was written by Sandé along with Tom Barnes, Peter Kelleher, Ben Kohn, and Wayne Hector and produced by Barnes, Kelleher, and Kohn under their production moniker TMS. The song was released as the album's third and final single on 7 March 2017.

== Music video ==
An accompanying music video for "Highs & Lows" was released in 31 January 2017. It was directed by Charles Mehling, who also directed the album's previous videos, and depicts Sandé performing among friends.

== Track listings ==
Digital download
No.	Title	Length
1.	"Highs & Lows" (Album Version)	3:14

Remix EP
No.	Title	Length
1.	"Highs & Lows" (Kove Remix)	3:15
2.	"Highs & Lows" (APEXAPE Remix)	6:09

Remix single
No.	Title	Length
1.	"Highs & Lows" (The Wild Remix)	3:23

== Credits and personnel ==
Credits adapted from the liner notes of Long Live the Angels.

- Tom Barnes – programming
- Kevin Davis – mixing
- Pete Kelleher – synth
- Sam Klempner – recording
- Ben Kohn – guitar
- Jodi Milliner – bass
- Robbie Nelson – recording
- Gavin Powell – organ, piano
- Emeli Sandé – vocals, writing
- Leo Taylor – drums

== Charts ==
Chart (2017)	Peak position
Belgium (Dance Bubbling Under Flanders)	2
