= Kingdom Coming (EP) =

EP by Emeli Sandé
- Released: 3 November 2017
- Length: 26:18
- Label: Virgin
- Producer: Emeli Sandé; Rachet; Troy Lynch; Gavin Powell; Shakaveli; Wez Clarke

Emeli Sandé chronology
Long Live the Angels (2016)	Kingdom Coming (2017)	Real Life (2019)

Kingdom Coming is an extended play (EP) by Scottish singer songwriter Emeli Sandé, released on 3 November 2017 by Virgin Records. Kingdom Coming is Sandé's third EP following 2013 iTunes Sessions and 2016's Live from London Bridge, and also follows Sandé's second studio album Long Live the Angels (2016). The EP features Harlem rapper Dave East, as well as collaborations with UK grime rappers Giggs and Wretch 32.

== Background and conception ==
Following the release of multiple singles from Sandé's debut album Our Version of Events (2013), which amassed over 2.3 million copies sold in the UK, Sandé would release Long Live the Angels (2016), which sold less than her debut. A year later in 2017, Kingdom Coming was announced featuring six songs including a collaboration with Harlem rapper Dave East. Thematically, Sandé noted that Long Live the Angels was emotionally deep and towards the end of writing that album, she "wanted to give the light at the end of the tunnel". Coupled without the pressure of releasing a project, Sandé noted that she was able to "try something with a different production", especially as the song "Starlight" also had an acoustic version which showcased the lyrics more. It was also noted that between the release of Long Live the Angels and Kingdom Coming, Sandé was awarded a MBE by British monarch Elizabeth II for her services to music. This impacted the tone and direction of Kingdom Coming.

Describing the process of creating Kingdom Coming, Sandé said "it was made in complete freedom and pure passion. I invited some genius friends of mine to join me in the countryside to express themselves with no restrictions, and it's been an honour". The collection was recorded in the space of one week. The cover art for the EP is a school picture of Sandé with her father Joel from 1992. Sandé called the EP a "bridge" to where she wished to take her next album.

== Music and composition ==
The collaboration with East opens the EP and is a "beat-driven number" with delicate vocals and a mellow tone. The second song "Love Is War" features a piano melody, combining elements of jazz music. British rapper Giggs joins Sandé on "Higher", a darker and "grittier" song while track four "Deep" evokes 90s soul music. Speaking about the song "Startlight", Sandé said it was conceived after realising she was "a lot happier and a lot lighter" and because "It wasn't attached to anything, so it was just about being free and having a bit of fun with the music". The acoustic version is included on Kingdom Coming, and featured a more stripped back production reminiscent of many of Sandé's earlier songs. The Evening Standard's Harry Fletcher noted that "Starlight" had a distinctly "dancier" and "more immediate" sound than the "less than celebratory" tone of second album Long Live the Angels. One of the reasons for this was that Long Live the Angels was conceived after Sandé's divorce from husband Adam Gouraguine, and "Starlight" celebrated a new romantic partner in her life. Speaking in more detail about the song, Sandé said: "It's a song all about falling in love, and something I can definitely dance to and it reflects somewhere where I'm at in my life. Falling in love with someone is an amazing experience." The EP closes with the Wretch 32-assisted title track.

== Critical reception ==
Pip Ellwood-Hughes from Entertainment Focus opined that although Kingdom Coming was "not as memorable" as prior releases, it would likely tide fans over until Sandé's next album. The acoustic version of "Starlight" was praised as the EP's standout track while criticism was directed towards "Deep" as Ellwood-Hughes felt "Sandé was oddly disconnected from the production" and there was indifference for both Wretch 32's contribution and the title track overall.

== Release and promotion ==
"Starlight" was released as the first single from the EP on 20 September 2017. The EP was released on 3 November 2017.

== Track listing ==
Kingdom Coming track listing
No.	Title	Writer(s)	Producer(s)	Length
1.	"Soon" (featuring Dave East)	Adele Emily Sandé; David Brewster Jr.; Troy Lynch	Lynch; Gavin Powell	4:13
2.	"Love Not War"	Sandé; Gavin Powell; Aaron Powell; Dexter Hercules	Emeli Sandé; G. Powell; Rachet	3:37
3.	"Higher" (featuring Giggs)	Sandé; G. Powell; Nathaniel Thompson; Laidi Saliasi	Rachet; G. Powell	4:41
4.	"Deep"	Sandé; Shakil Ashraf	Shakaveli; ProducerWez; G. Powell; Sandé	4:49
5.	"Starlight" (acoustic)	Sandé; Carlo Montagnese; Billy Walsh	Sandé; G. Powell	3:47
6.	"Kingdom Coming" (featuring Wretch 32)	Sandé; Jermaine Sinclaire Scott; Harry Craze; Hugo Chegwin	Sandé; G. Powell; Rachet	5:11
Total length:				26:18

== Credits and personnel ==
Vocals

- Emeli Sandé – lead vocals
- Dave East – featured vocals (track 1)
- Giggs – featured vocals (track 3)
- Wretch 32 – featured vocals (track 6)

Musicians and technicians

- Mike Davies – guitar (track 5)
- Lewis Gibbs – assistant recording engineer (tracks 2–3, 6)
- Isabel Gracefield – recording engineer (tracks 3, 6)
- Dexter Hercules – drums (tracks 2–3, 6)
- Lewis Hopkin – mastering engineer (tracks 1–6)
- Miles James – synthesizers (tracks 3, 6), guitar (track 6)
- Troy Lynch – recording engineer (track 1)
- Arran Powell – bass guitar (tracks 2–3, 6)
- Gavin Powell – Hammond organ (tracks 1–4, 6), producer (track 1), additional producer (track 1), piano (tracks 2, 6)
- Felix Rashman – recording engineer (track 5)
- Ratchet – audio mixing (tracks 1–6), recording engineer (tracks 2–4, 6)
- Emeli Sandé – recording arranger (track 4)
- Shakaveli – programming (track 4)

== Charts ==
Weekly chart performance for Kingdom Coming
Chart (2017)	Peak position
UK Album Downloads (OCC)	30
