= List of listed buildings in Towie =

This is a list of listed buildings in the parish of Towie in Aberdeenshire, Scotland.

== List ==
Name	Location	Date Listed	Grid Ref. (Note: Sometimes known as OSGB36, the grid reference (where provided) is based on the British national grid reference system used by the Ordnance Survey. • "Guide to National Grid". Ordnance Survey. • "Get-a-map". Ordnance Survey.)	Geo-coordinates	Notes	LB Number (Note: Historic Environment Scotland assign a unique alphanumeric identifier to each designated site in Scotland, for listed buildings this always begins with "LB", for example "LB12345".)	Image
Glenkindie Arms Hotel				57°12′43″N 2°55′35″W	Category B	19764	Upload Photo
Glenkindie Garden Walls And Gates				57°12′59″N 2°57′25″W	Category B	15946	Upload Photo
Parish Church Churchyard				57°12′14″N 2°55′45″W	Category B	15934	Upload Photo
Parish Hall, Towie				57°12′13″N 2°55′42″W	Category C(S)	15938	Upload Photo
Glenkindie House, East Gates				57°12′56″N 2°57′01″W	Category C(S)	15942	Upload Photo
Glenkindie House, Doocot				57°12′57″N 2°57′30″W	Category B	15944	Upload Photo
Kinbattoch, Steading				57°11′42″N 2°56′48″W	Category B	15940	Upload Photo
Parish Church				57°12′14″N 2°55′45″W	Category B	15933	Upload Photo
Waterside				57°12′40″N 2°55′57″W	Category B	15941	Upload Photo
Glenkindie House Sundial In Forecourt				57°13′01″N 2°57′27″W	Category B	19765	Upload Photo
Manse Offices				57°12′15″N 2°55′47″W	Category C(S)	15936	Upload Photo
Mill Of Glenkindie				57°13′03″N 2°56′51″W	Category B	15948	Upload another image
Manse (Now Mr. Kelman Belnaboth)				57°12′15″N 2°55′46″W	Category B	15935	Upload Photo
Kinbattoch, Farm House				57°11′41″N 2°56′46″W	Category B	15939	Upload Photo
Glenkindie House, West Gates				57°12′52″N 2°57′54″W	Category B	15943	Upload Photo
Glenkindie House				57°13′02″N 2°57′27″W	Category A	15945	Upload Photo
Deskry Bridge Over Deskry Water				57°11′53″N 3°00′57″W	Category C(S)	15949	Upload Photo
Old School House, Towie				57°12′13″N 2°55′45″W	Category B	15937	Upload Photo
Glenkindie Sundial In E. Section Of Garden				57°13′01″N 2°57′24″W	Category B	15947	Upload Photo

== Key ==
The scheme for classifying buildings in Scotland is:

- Category A: "buildings of national or international importance, either architectural or historic; or fine, little-altered examples of some particular period, style or building type."
- Category B: "buildings of regional or more than local importance; or major examples of some particular period, style or building type, which may have been altered."
- Category C: "buildings of local importance; lesser examples of any period, style, or building type, as originally constructed or moderately altered; and simple traditional buildings which group well with other listed buildings."

In March 2016 there were 47,288 listed buildings in Scotland. Of these, 8% were Category A, and 50% were Category B, with the remaining 42% being Category C.

== See also ==
- List of listed buildings in Aberdeenshire
