= Breathing Underwater (song) =

Single by Emeli Sandé

from the album Long Live the Angels
- Released: 28 October 2016
- Studio: AIR (London, UK); British Grove (London, UK)
- Length: 4:22
- Label: Virgin
- Songwriter(s): Emeli Sandé; Chris Crowhurst
- Producer(s): Chris Loco

Emeli Sandé singles chronology
"Hurts" (2016)	"Breathing Underwater" (2016)	"Highs & Lows" (2017)

Music video
- "Breathing Underwater" on YouTube

"Breathing Underwater" is a song by Scottish singer Emeli Sandé, recorded for her second studio album Long Live the Angels (2016). It was written by Sandé and Chris Loco, while production was helmed by Loco. The song was released as the album's second single on 28 October 2016 and became a top twenty hit on the Scottish Singles Chart. In support of its release, Sandé performed the song live on The X Factor on 6 November.

== Music video ==
A music video for "Breathing Underwater", directed by Tim Mattia, was released on 9 November 2016.

== Track listings ==
Digital download
No.	Title	Length
1.	"Breathing Underwater" (Album Version)	4:22

Remix single
No.	Title	Length
1.	"Breathing Underwater" (Matrix & Futurebound Remix)	4:38

== Credits and personnel ==
Credits adapted from the liner notes of Long Live the Angels.

- Chris Loco – keyboards, percussion, production, recording
- Kieron McIntosh – upright piano
- Raf Riley – mixing
- Harriet Pope – harp
- Gavin Powell – organ
- Emeli Sandé – vocals

== Charts ==
Chart (2016)	Peak position
Scotland (OCC)	19
UK Singles (OCC)	78
