= Long Live the Angels =

Studio album by Emeli Sandé
- Released: 11 November 2016
- Recorded: 2013 – August 2016
- Studio: Angelic (Banbury, UK); Prestige Worldwide (Hollywood, California; Air Edel (London, UK); AIR (London, UK); Angel (London, UK); The Bridge (London, UK); British Grove (London, UK); The Garden (London, UK); Naughty Boy (London, UK); Oddchild (London, UK); The Penthouse (London, UK); Playdeep (London, UK); Strongroom (London, UK); RAK (London, UK); The Wood (London, UK); Westlake (Los Angeles, California); The Music Shed (New Orleans); Jupiter Studios (St. Louis, Missouri)
- Genre: R&B
- Length: 51:56
- Label: Virgin
- Producer: Emeli Sandé; Jonny Coffer; Chris Loco; Mac & Phil; Mojam; Naughty Boy; ProducerWez; Rachet; Shakaveli; TMS

Emeli Sandé chronology
Live at the Royal Albert Hall (2013)	Long Live the Angels (2016)	Kingdom Coming (2017)

Singles from Long Live the Angels
- 1. "Hurts" Released: 16 September 2016; 2. "Garden" Released: 13 October 2016; 3. "Breathing Underwater" Released: 28 October 2016; 4. "Highs & Lows" Released: 17 March 2017

Long Live the Angels is the second studio album by Scottish recording artist Emeli Sandé, released on 11 November 2016 by Virgin Records. The lead single from the album, "Hurts", was released on 16 September 2016. Sandé embarked on a European tour to support the album, with dates in the United Kingdom, France, the Netherlands, Germany and Sweden.

== Background and production ==
Long Live the Angels is the follow-up to Sandé's debut album Our Version of Events (2012), which spawned four top-ten singles, as well as subsequent collaborations with Labrinth ("Beneath Your Beautiful"), Naughty Boy ("Lifted") and David Guetta ("What I Did for Love"). The album was recorded in the four years preceding its release and was originally intended to be released before Christmas 2015. However, when fellow British singer Adele announced her then-upcoming album 25 would be released before Christmas, Sandé pushed her album back to the following year. In January 2016, Sandé was pictured at Angelic Studios in Oxfordshire putting the finishing touches to the album. During an interview with the Evening Standard, Sandé explained why she took her time recording the album: "I feel like I needed to just get away from it. Being a pop star was never really my big thought—it was just to be a musician. I think the further you get from real life, the less you have to write about". During an interview, she said:

For a long time, I couldn't imagine ever going there again. I wanted to sing, but I wanted to do that in a totally different way. If I was going to come back, I had to know I could be an artist and not a product. For me, it was an accident that it was so successful. How do you go from this awkward, shy person to being out there, trying to protect yourself, but giving enough to get the music across? It's such a strange balancing act.

— Sandé during an interview with ith The Sunday Times Culture magazine in 2016.

== Music and lyrics ==
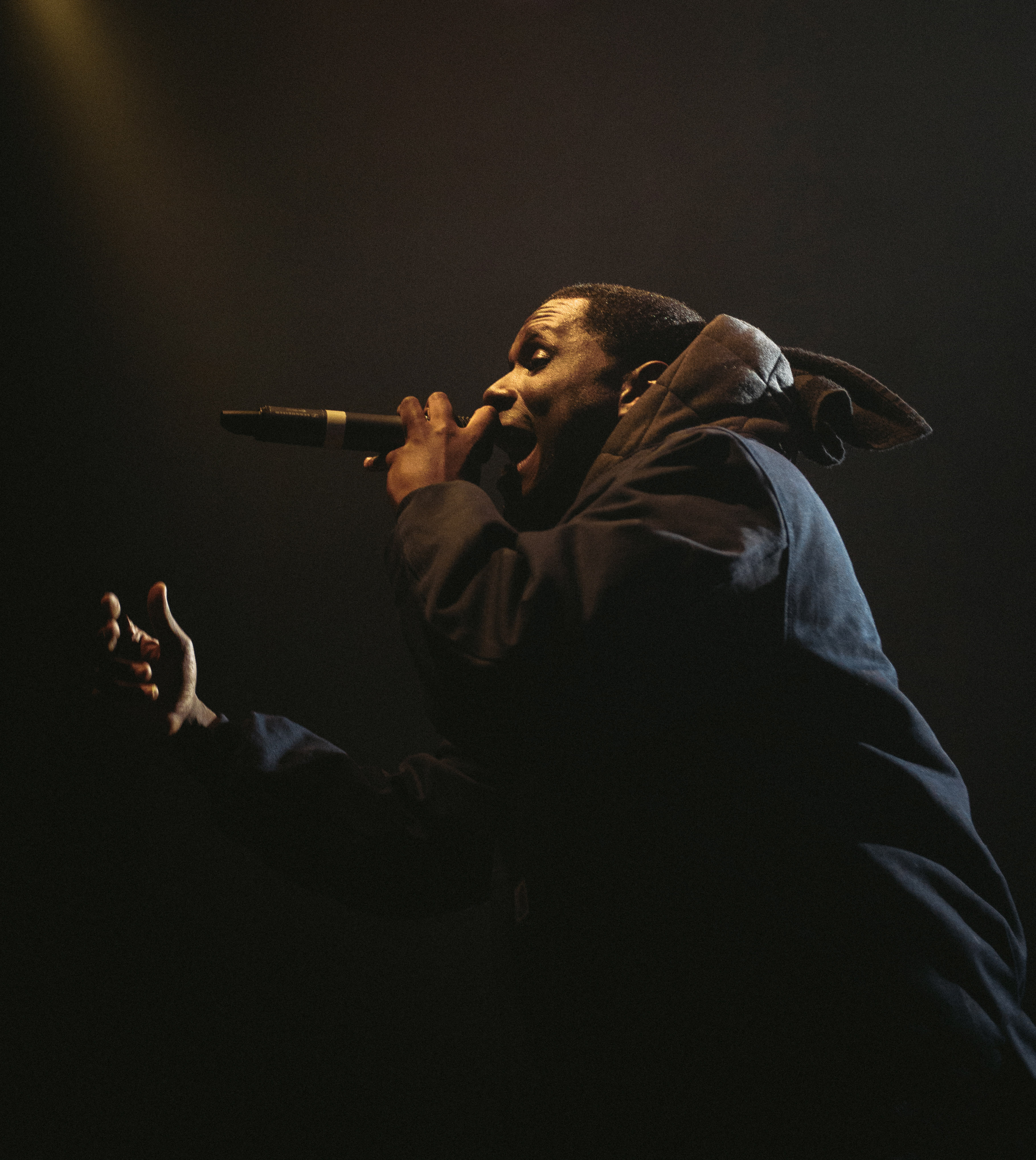
US rapper Jay Electronica features on the second single "Garden", which was released alongside the album's pre-order.

Long Live the Angels explores themes of salvation, devotion, pain and perseverance, which according to AllMusic, might have reflected the singer's marriage to her "long-term partner in 2012" and subsequent diverse shortly after. Sandé confirmed this herself when speaking about the first single "Hurts" and the breakup, saying "I mean, this was the only relationship I'd ever experienced, so to finally be without him and without the relationship in my life, it took a lot of adjusting. ... So 'Hurts' came when I felt a bit more stable and ready to face it. This was the first time I addressed it within myself". The BBC described the song as a sweeping and cinematic "emotional outburst". "Hurts" features "urgent chugging strings [that] darkly underline the emotions" behind the song's lyrics. It also features acoustic guitars and a choir.

The album was also influenced by Sandé's Zambian heritage. Sandé's father was asked to contribute to the song "Tenderly" during a visit to the country, along with cousins and a local choice, credited as the Serenje Choir, named after the town of Serenje in the Serenje District of Zambia. She told the BBC that the journey was "such a big spiritual turning point". Voice memos recorded during the trip are included on the album.

Meanwhile, the album's only other guest vocalists appear on the song "Garden", which is built around a "sparse backbeat weaved between snapped rhythms" and "lone deep bassline". It features a poetic intro and outro by Áine Zion. According to Sandé, Zion's parts were recorded in New York, and the song had been in production since 2014. Upon meeting US rapper Jay Electronica the following summer, Sandé asked Electronica to add to the song; he contributed "stream-of-consciousness bars [that] contemplate love, the world's sometimes seemingly indifference to it and the fear of yielding to the emotion." His verse compares love to being a sanctuary, referencing the 1984 Prince song "Purple Rain" and also comparing love to a death sentence. Lyrically, Sandé has said that the song sees her "telling the truth, but kind of showing all sides of me this time".

Long Live the Angels also contains a number of ballads that deal with "consequences of a broken relationship, lamenting false dreams, yearning for fulfilment, and admitting [an] inability to simply brush it off". On "I'd Rather Not", Sandé directs lyrics at rejecting second chances, with metaphors that compare those to natural disasters and "bullet wounds". It follows the ups and downs of a relationship until it reaches breaking point, and features "sparse sprays of organ". Soulful songs "Every Single Little Piece" and the fourth single "Highs & Lows" are "big and ebullient". Other songs include "Give Me Something", which features acoustic guitar reminiscent of "The Tracks of My Tears" and combines both folk and soul, drawing inspiration from Tracy Chapman. Further mixing of sounds can be hear on the album's opening track "Selah" where the production features a "miasmic montage of trickling water and ambient sounds", while the vocals include "high tones" and "humming", which bring the lyrics to life.

== Critical reception ==
Professional ratings
Aggregate scores
Source	Rating
Metacritic	72/100
Review scores
Source	Rating
AllMusic	4/5 stars
Chicago Tribune	3/4 stars
The Daily Telegraph	5/5 stars
The Guardian	3/5 stars
The Independent	4/5 stars
NME	3/5 stars
The Observer	3/5 stars
Pitchfork	5.4/10

Long Live the Angels received generally favourable reviews from critics. At Metacritic, which assigns a normalised rating out of 100 to reviews from mainstream publications, the album received an average score of 72, based on 11 reviews. Neil McCormick, writing for The Daily Telegraph, rated the album five out of five stars and declared it "a thrilling second album that affirms Sandé as a singular talent". He noted that "Long Live the Angels is something special, the sound of a gifted, grown-up singer-songwriter using all the tools at her disposal to put her own heart back together." AllMusic editor Andy Kellman felt that the album was "built to maintain her rank [...] Sandé sings with more precision and force without overselling anything. There's also more nuance to her approach [...] Certain listeners might bemoan the shortage of uptempo belters here, but one attentive and thorough listen presents a clear justification."

Chicago Tribune journalist Greg Kot wrote that Long Live the Angels "sounds lean and unadorned when compared to its best-selling predecessor, and is all the better for it. Some songs are stripped to little more than a guitar and voice, but Sande doesn't rely on vocal acrobatics to fill in the gaps. She whispers and roars, breathing with the songs instead of trying to overwhelm them." In his review for The New York Times, Jon Pareles remarked that Sandé's "return is lucid and uncluttered, placing all the expressiveness of her voice at its center. [She] could easily oversing; she has delicacy, volume, graininess, melismas and sly, rhythmic nuances whenever she needs them. But she inhabits her songs rather than overpowering them [...] Intertwining love, faith and music, as Ms. Sandé does through much of the album, is a time-tested idea. But it's also an abiding and deserving one, especially when it's carried off with such unfailing grace."

Andy Gill, writing for The Independent, noted that "the more interesting aspects of the album are to be found in less formulaic arrangements, [...] settling into a folk-soul setting clearly influenced by Tracy Chapman." The Observer journalist Bernadette McNulty found that "a repetitive wash of acoustic guitars and consoling choirs dull the emotion, and Sandé is too polite to go for the jugular." Less enthusiastic, Pitchfork contributor Katherine St. Asaph felt that "too much of Long Live the Angels just feels turgid [...] Sandé sings, well and interchangeably, over a dozen tracks of stately but amorphous gloom – the sort of beige dramatics The Guardian dubbed, in 2011, the new boring'." Barry Nicolson from NME wrote that "of course, at 15 tracks long, there's no shortage of saccharine X Factor balladry either [..] Sandé clearly has the chops to stand out in the sophisticated cross-platform arms race of modern pop music but you still wish she didn't fall back so readily on cliché."

== Marketing and promotion ==
The song "Garden" featuring Jay Electronica and Áine Zion was debuted on BBC Radio 1's evening show with Annie Mac on 12 October 2016. "Garden" was released digitally alongside the album's artwork and track listing the following day. The music video for "Garden" premiered 15 November 2016.

Sande also toured in promotion of the album. The Long Live the Angels Tour included Sandé's first arena shows totalling 40 shows across 2017.

== Chart performance ==
Long Live the Angels debuted at number two on the UK Albums Chart, behind Olly Murs' 24 Hrs. During the first week of the release, it sold 47,512 copies.

== Track listing ==
Standard edition
No.	Title	Writer(s)	Producer(s)	Length
1.	"Selah"	Adele Emily Sandé	A. Sandé; ProducerWez^{[a]}	2:29
2.	"Breathing Underwater"	A. Sandé; Christopher Crowhurst	Chris Loco	4:22
3.	"Happen"	A. Sandé; Matthew Holmes; Philip Leigh; Jonny Coffer; Shahid Khan	Naughty Boy; Mac & Phil	3:35
4.	"Hurts"	A. Sandé; Holmes; Leigh; James Murray; Mustafa Omer	Mac & Phil; Mojam	3:58
5.	"Give Me Something"	A. Sandé; Holmes; Leigh; Crowhurst	A. Sandé; Mac & Phil	3:52
6.	"Right Now"	A. Sandé; Holmes; Leigh; Khan	Naughty Boy; Mac & Phil	2:14
7.	"Shakes"	A. Sandé; Khan; Coffer	Naughty Boy; Coffer	2:49
8.	"Garden" (featuring Jay Electronica and Áine Zion)	A. Sandé; Crowhurst; Timothy Thedford; Áine Zion	Loco	4:02
9.	"I'd Rather Not"	A. Sandé; Khan; Coffer; Shakil Ashraf	Naughty Boy; Shakaveli	3:49
10.	"Lonely"	A. Sandé; Holmes; Murray; Omer; Leigh	Mac & Phil; Mojam	3:33
11.	"Sweet Architect"	A. Sandé; Coffer; Omer; Murray	Coffer; Mojam	3:19
12.	"Tenderly" (featuring Joel Sandé and The Serenje Choir)	A. Sandé; Holmes; Leigh; Joel Sandé	Mac & Phil	3:22
13.	"Every Single Little Piece"	A. Sandé; Holmes; Leigh	Mac & Phil	4:03
14.	"Highs & Lows"	A. Sandé; Tom Barnes; Peter Kelleher; Ben Kohn; Wayne Hector	TMS	3:14
15.	"Babe"	A. Sandé; Holmes; Leigh	Mac & Phil; Loco^{[a]}; Gavin Powell^{[b]}; Pantha^{[b]}	3:15
Total length:				51:56

iTunes Store bonus track
No.	Title	Writer(s)	Producer(s)	Length
16.	"Hurts" (acoustic)	A. Sandé; Holmes; Leigh; Murray; Omer	Mac & Phil; Mojam	4:16
Total length:				56:12

Deluxe edition bonus tracks
No.	Title	Writer(s)	Producer(s)	Length
16.	"Kung Fu"	A. Sandé; Coffer	A. Sandé; Rachet	3:57
17.	"Somebody"	A. Sandé; Crowhurst	Loco	2:43
18.	"This Much Is True"	A. Sandé	A. Sandé	3:32
Total length:				62:08

iTunes Store deluxe edition bonus track
No.	Title	Writer(s)	Producer(s)	Length
19.	"Hurts" (acoustic)	A. Sandé; Murray; Omer; Holmes; Leigh	Mac & Phil; Mojam	4:16
Total length:				66:24

Japanese and US Target bonus tracks
No.	Title	Writer(s)	Producer(s)	Length
19.	"Naturally"	A. Sandé; Barnes; Hector; Kelleher; Kohn	TMS	5:31
20.	"Dream On"	A. Sandé; Coffer	Coffer	2:04
Total length:				69:45

Notes

- ^{^[a]} denotes co-producer
- ^{^[b]} denotes additional producer

== Credits and personnel ==
=== Recording locations ===
- Banbury, UK – Angelic Studios
- Hollywood, California – Prestige Worldwide
- London, UK – Air Edel, AIR Studios, Angel Recording Studios, The Bridge, British Grove Studios, The Garden, Naughty Boy Recordings, Oddchild Studios, The Penthouse, Playdeep Studios, Strongroom Music Studios, RAK Studios, The Wood
- Los Angeles, California – Westlake Recording Studios
- New Orleans – The Music Shed
- St. Louis, Missouri – Jupiter Studios

=== Personnel ===
Vocals

- Jay Electronica – featured vocals (track 8)
- Luke Gibbs – background vocals (track 13)
- Jake Gordon – background vocals (track 13)
- Matt Holmes – background vocals (track 13)
- Philip Leigh – background vocals (track 13)
- Emeli Sandé – lead vocals, background vocals
- Joel Sandé – featured vocals (track 12)
- Áine Zion – featured vocals (track 8)

Choir: The MajorTonesMusic Gospel Choir – choir vocals (tracks 1–2, 4, 11)

- Aleysha Gordon
- Angel Silviera
- "Connie" Dawn Morton-Young
- Hannah Khemoh
- Keisha Smith
- Rachel McKenzie
- Becky Thomas
- Sherelle McKenzie
- Christina Matova
- Emily Holligan
- Jayanda Balfour
- Josie Nugent
- Ladonna Harley-Peters
- Tentola Abasede
- Victoria Akintola
- Jason Nicholson-Porter
- Matthew Allen
- Paul Boldeau
- Porter Shields
- Riccardo Williams
- Ryan Carty
- Tobi Oyerinde
- Wesley Muoria-Chaves

Choir: The Serenje Choir – choir vocals (track 12)

- Abigail Mutate
- Gillian Mutate
- Green Kalunga
- Ireen Mukasha
- Joel Sandé
- Maneland Chibuye
- Matilda Mpande
- Maureen Mwape
- Oxicillia Mpande
- Prudence Chola
- Richard Mwape
- Rozen Chibale
- Ruth Chibuye
- Thelma Mwape

Musicians

- Rebekah Allan – violin (tracks 2, 4)
- Shakil "Shakaveli" Ashraf – drum programming (track 9), keyboards (track 9), producer (track 9)
- Elizabeth Ball – violin (tracks 10, 13)
- Mark Berrow – violin (tracks 10, 13)
- Zara Benyounes – violin (tracks 2, 4)
- Jack Birchwood – trumpet (track 4)
- Rachel Bolt – viola (tracks 10, 13)
- Natalia Bonner – violin (tracks 2, 4)
- Courtney Brown – trombone (track 4)
- Nozomi Cohen – viola (tracks 2, 4)
- Jonny Coffer – string programming (tracks 3, 7), string arranger (track 7), keyboard (track 11), piano (track 11), producer (track 11)
- Theon Cross – tuba (track 4)
- David Daniels – cello (tracks 10, 13)
- Rosie Danvers – string arrangement (tracks 2, 4), cello (track 2, 4)
- Alison Dods – violin (tracks 10, 13)
- Ruben Fox – saxophone (track 4)
- Gillianne Haddow – viola (tracks 10, 13)
- Marianne Haynes – violin (tracks 10, 13)
- Matt Holmes – drum programming (track 3, 15), bass (track 4, 10, 12), drums (tracks 4–5, 12–13), handclaps (track 4), percussion (track 12–13)
- Martin Humbey – viola (tracks 10, 13)
- Jake Jackson – strings recording (tracks 2, 4)
- Sally Jackson – violin (tracks 2, 4)
- Joe Kearns – choir recording (tracks 1–2, 4, 11)
- Peter Kelleher – synths (track 14)
- Patrick Kiernan – violin (tracks 2, 4)
- Ben Kohn – guitar (track 14)
- Peter Lale – viola (tracks 10, 13)
- Oli Langford – violin (tracks 10, 13)
- Chris Laurence – double bass (tracks 10, 13)
- Philip Leigh – bass (tracks 3, 5, 13), electric guitar (tracks 3–4, 13), acoustic guitar (tracks 3, 5, 10, 13), electric piano (track 4), synth (track 4), handclaps (track 4), guitar (tracks 6, 12), keyboard (track 10), piano (track 12–13), drum programming (track 15), guitar sampler (track 15)
- Andrew Lippman – trombone (track 12)
- Chris Loco – producer (tracks 2, 8), keyboards (tracks 2, 8), percussion (track 2), synthesizer (track 2), co-producer (track 15), drum programming (track 15)
- Mac & Phil – producer (tracks 3–4, 6, 10, 12–13, 15)
- Cliff Masterson – string arrangement (tracks 10, 13)
- Eleanor Mathieson – violin (tracks 2, 4)
- Vicky Matthews – cello (tracks 10, 13)
- Scott Mayo – flute, saxophone (track 12)
- Kieron McIntosh – upright piano (track 2), brass arranger (track 4), trumpet (track 4)
- Laura Melhuish – violin (tracks 10, 13)
- Jodi Milliner – bass (track 14)
- Mojam – producer (tracks 4, 10–11)
- Steve Morris – violin (tracks 2, 4, 10, 13)
- Jeremy Murphy – strings recording (tracks 2, 4)
- James Murray – keyboard programming (track 4), keyboard (track 10)
- Kate Musker – viola (tracks 10, 13)
- Bryony Mycroft – viola (tracks 2, 4)
- Naughty Boy – producer (tracks 3, 6–7, 9), keyboard (track 9)
- Jane Oliver – cello (tracks 2, 4)
- Mustafa Omer – keyboard programming (track 4), keyboard (track 10)
- Emma Owens – viola (tracks 2, 4)
- Tobi Oyerinde – choir arrangements (tracks 1–2, 4, 11)
- Pantha – additional producer (track 15)
- Tom Pigott-Smith – strings leader (tracks 10–13), violin (tracks 10, 13)
- Harriet Pope – hard (track 2)
- Gavin Powell – organ (tracks 2–5, 10–11, 14), handclaps (track 15), additional producer (track 15)
- ProducerWez – co-producer (track 1)
- Richard Pryce – double bass (tracks 2, 4)
- Kate Robinson – violin (tracks 10, 13)
- Jenny Sacha – violin (tracks 2, 4)
- Emeli Sandé – handclaps (track 4), producer (track 1, 5)
- Joel Sandé – choir arranger (track 12)
- Will Schofield – cello (tracks 10, 13)
- Sonia Slany – violin (tracks 10, 13)
- Ellie Stanford – violin (tracks 2, 4)
- Wired Strings – strings (tracks 2, 4)
- Nicky Sweeney – violin (tracks 10, 13)
- Leo Taylor – drums (track 14)
- Greg Titmarsh – cajón (track 12)
- TMS (Tom Barnes, Peter Kelleher and Ben Kohn) – producer (track 14)
- Stacey Watton – double bass (tracks 10, 13)
- Matt Ward – violin (tracks 10, 13)
- Jonathan Williams – cello (tracks 10, 13)
- Dontae Wislow – brass arranger (track 12), trumpet (track 12)

Technicians

- Shakil "Shakaveli" Ashraf – recording (track 9)
- Tom Barnes – programming (track 14)
- Ray Brown – brass recording (track 12)
- Jonny Coffer – recording (track 7), programming (track 11)
- Kevin "KD" Davis – mixing (track 11, 14)
- Tom Elmhirst – mixing (track 10)
- Luke Gibbs – assistant engineer (tracks 3–6, 10, 13)
- Jake Gordon – recording (tracks 3–6, 10, 13), mixing (tracks 5–6, 13), vocal recording for Jay Electronica (track 8)
- Bill Halliday – vocal recording (track 12)
- Stuart Hawkes – mastering
- Matt Holmes – programming (track 5–6, 10, 12–13)
- Sam Klempner – recording (track 14)
- Philip Leigh – programming (track 3, 5, 10, 12–13)
- Chris Loco – programming (tracks 2, 8), recording (tracks 2, 8, 15)
- Mac & Phil – mixing (track 3, 12), recording (tracks 3–4, 6, 12–13, 15)
- Mojam – mixing (track 4), recording (track 4, 10)
- Welsey Muoria-Chaves – programming (track 1)
- James Murray – programming (track 10–11)
- Naughty Boy – programming (track 3, 6–7, 9), recording (track 3, 6–7, 9), mixing (track 9)
- Robbie Nelson – recording (track 14)
- Mustafa Omer – programming (track 10–11)
- Gavin Powell – recording (track 15)
- ProducerWez – mixing (track 1)
- Raf Riley – mixing (tracks 2, 8, 15)
- Gary Thomas – brass recording (track 4)

Artwork

- Alex Cowper – design
- Emeli Sandé – art direction
- Dan Sanders – art direction

== Charts ==
=== Weekly charts ===
Weekly chart performance for Long Live the Angels
Chart (2016)	Peak position
Australian Albums (ARIA)	20
Austrian Albums (Ö3 Austria)	30
Belgian Albums (Ultratop Flanders)	9
Belgian Albums (Ultratop Wallonia)	35
Canadian Albums (Billboard)	70
Dutch Albums (Album Top 100)	21
French Albums (SNEP)	65
German Albums (Offizielle Top 100)	12
Irish Albums (IRMA)	6
Italian Albums (FIMI)	84
New Zealand Albums (RMNZ)	29
Scottish Albums (OCC)	1
Slovakia (Albums - Top 100)	25
Spanish Albums (PROMUSICAE)	53
Swedish Albums (Sverigetopplistan)	52
Swiss Albums (Schweizer Hitparade)	9
UK Albums (OCC)	2
US Billboard 200	41
US Top R&B/Hip-Hop Albums (Billboard)	4

=== Year-end charts ===
Year-end chart performance for Long Live the Angels
Chart (2016)	Position
Belgian Albums (Ultratop Flanders)	86
UK Albums (OCC)	26
Chart (2017)	Position
Belgian Albums (Ultratop Flanders)	124

== Certifications ==
Certifications for Long Live the Angels
Region	Certification	Certified units/sales
United Kingdom (BPI)	Platinum	300,000^{‡}
^{‡} Sales+streaming figures based on certification alone.
