= How Were We to Know =

Studio album by Emeli Sandé
- Released: 17 November 2023
- Length: 41:19
- Label: Chrysalis

Emeli Sandé chronology
| Let's Say for Instance (2022) | How Were We to Know (2023) |

Singles from How Were We to Know
- 1. "There for You" Released: 23 August 2023; 2. "How Were We to Know" Released: 20 September 2023; 3. "All This Love" Released: 18 October 2023

How Were We to Know is the fifth studio album by Scottish singer Emeli Sandé. It was released by Chrysalis Records on 17 November 2023.

== Critical reception ==
Professional ratings
Review scores
| Source | Rating |
|---|---|
| i | 3/5 stars |
| laut.de | 2/5 stars |
| The Scotsman | 2/5 stars |

The Scotsman critic Fiona Shepherd noted that How Were We to Know "features more general musings on the nature of love and heartbreak, delivered with her usual MOR lyrical wisdom, all just vague enough to apply universally." Ed Power from i noted that "there are moments on her latest album when she feels ready to take on the world. But epic emotions demand epic music. How Were We to Know misses its chance and too often settles for energy-sapping power balladry."

== Track listing ==
How Were We to Know track listing
| No. | Title | Writer(s) | Length |
|---|---|---|---|
| 1. | "All This Love" | Adele Emily Sandé; Matthew Holmes; Philip Leigh | 3:30 |
| 2. | "My Boy Likes to Party" | Sandé; Henri Davies | 3:25 |
| 3. | "Lighthouse" | Sandé; Leigh | 3:21 |
| 4. | "How Were We to Know" | Sandé; Leight; Chris Loco | 3:12 |
| 5. | "Too Much" | Sandé; Jonny Coffer | 2:54 |
| 6. | "Nothing We Can't Handle" | Sandé; Holmes; Leigh | 3:32 |
| 7. | "Like I Loved You" | Sandé; Ollie Green | 3:32 |
| 8. | "There for You" | Sandé; Daniel Caruana | 4:25 |
| 9. | "True Colours" | Sandé; Holmes; Leigh | 3:40 |
| 10. | "End of Time" | Sandé; Adam Lee | 3:59 |
| 11. | "Love" | Sandé | 5:45 |
| Total length: | | | 41:19 |

== Charts ==
Chart performance for How Were We to Know
| Chart (2023) | Peak position |
|---|---|
| Scottish Albums (OCC) | 19 |
| Swiss Albums (Schweizer Hitparade) | 84 |
| UK Albums (OCC) | 49 |
| UK Independent Albums (OCC) | 3 |

== Release history ==
Release dates and formats for How Were We to Know
| Region | Date | Format(s) | Label(s) | Ref. |
|---|---|---|---|---|
| Various | 17 November 2023 | CD; digital download; streaming; vinyl | Chrysalis | |
