= Alford Academy =

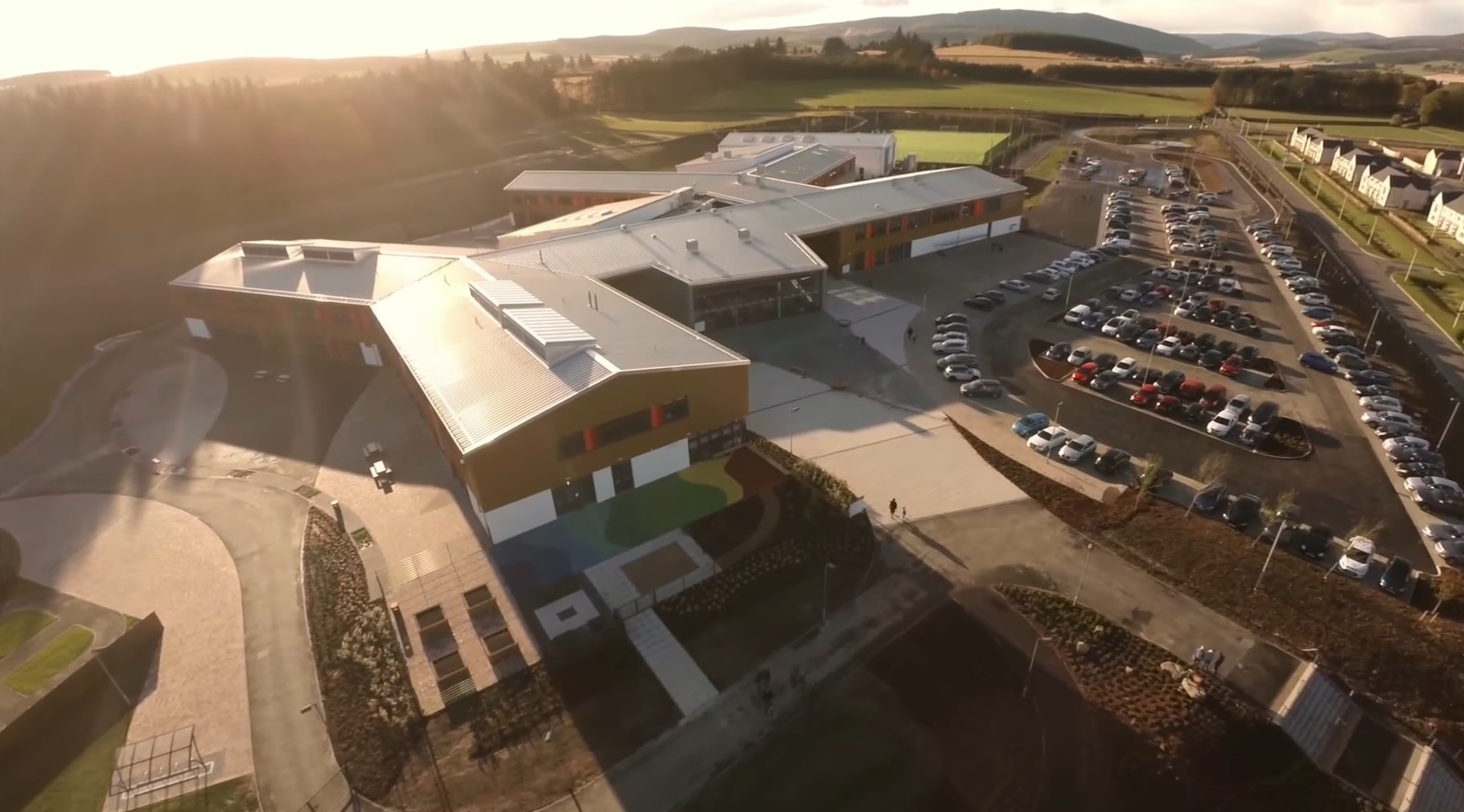

Location
- Greystone Road; Alford, Aberdeenshire, AB33 8TY; Scotland
- Coordinates: 57.2313°N 2.7075°W

Information
- Staff: 54
- Age: 11 to 18
- Enrolment: 602
- Classrooms: 55
- Campuses: 1
- Houses: Craigievar, Forbes, Glenbuchat and Kildrummy
- Colour: white
- School years: S1-S6
- Website: Alford Academy

Alford Academy is a secondary school in Alford, Aberdeenshire, Scotland, serving communities in a catchment zone that ranges from the Lecht to Dunecht.
