= Hurts (song) =

Single by Emeli Sandé

from the album Long Live the Angels
- Released: 16 September 2016
- Studio: AIR (London, UK); Angel (London, UK); British Grove (London, UK)
- Genre: R&B; pop
- Length: 3:57
- Label: Virgin Records
- Songwriter(s): Adele Emily Sandé; James Murray; Mustafa Omer; Matthew Holmes; Philip Leigh
- Producer(s): Mac & Phil; Mojam

Emeli Sandé singles chronology
"I.O.U" (2016)	"Hurts" (2016)	"Breathing Underwater" (2016)

"Hurts" is a song by Scottish recording artist Emeli Sandé, released as the lead single from her second album Long Live the Angels (2016) on 16 September 2016 through Virgin EMI Records in the United Kingdom. It was written by Sandé along with James Murray, Mustafa Omer, Matthew Holmes, and Philip Leigh, with production helmed by Mojam and duo Mac & Phil. Built around layers of percussion and double quick hand claps, the song peaked at number 22 on the UK Singles Chart and reached the top five in Scotland.

== Music video ==
An accompanying music video for "Hurts", directed by Dawn Shadforth, was released on 5 October 2016.

== Track listing ==
Digital download – Offaiah Remix
No.	Title	Length
1.	"Hurts" (Offaiah Edit)	3:18
2.	"Hurts" (Offaiah Remix)	6:51

Digital download – Remixes
No.	Title	Length
1.	"Hurts" (Dimension Remix)	4:37
2.	"Hurts" (Jynx Remix)	5:28

== Charts ==
Chart (2016–17)	Peak position
Belgium (Ultratop 50 Flanders)	28
Belgium (Ultratop 50 Wallonia)	27
Hungary (Single Top 40)	35
Ireland (IRMA)	53
Lebanon (Lebanese Top 20)	18
Scotland (OCC)	5
Slovakia (Rádio Top 100)	67
Switzerland (Schweizer Hitparade)	40
UK Singles (OCC)	22
UK Singles Downloads (OCC)	10
US Adult Pop Airplay (Billboard)	31
US Dance Club Songs (Billboard)	14

== Certifications and sales ==
Region	Certification	Certified units/sales
United Kingdom (BPI)	Gold	400,000^{‡}
^{‡} Sales+streaming figures based on certification alone.

== Release history ==
Region	Date	Format	Label
United Kingdom	16 September 2016	Digital download	Virgin Records
