= Emeli Sandé =

British singer (born 1987)

Emeli Sandé MBE
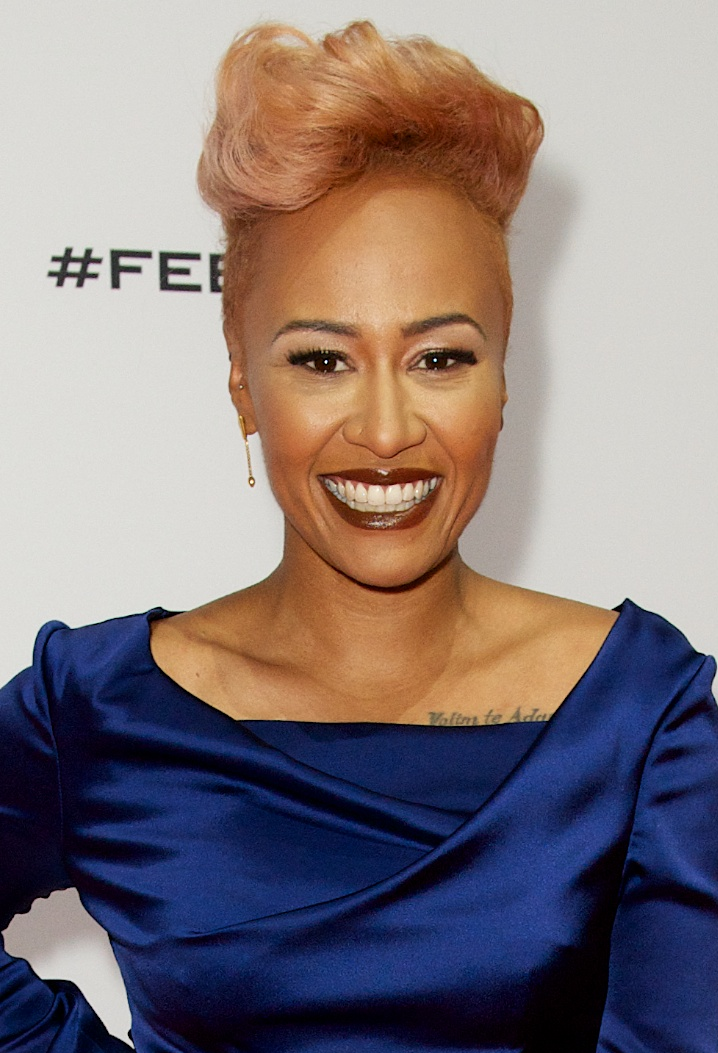
- Sandé in 2014

Background information
- Born: Adele Emily Sandé; 10 March 1987 (age 39); Sunderland, Tyne and Wear, England
- Origin: Alford, Aberdeenshire, Scotland
- Genres: R&B; soul; gospel
- Occupations: Singer; songwriter
- Instruments: Vocals; piano
- Years active: 2008–present
- Labels: Virgin; Virgin EMI; Capitol; Chrysalis
- Spouse: Adam Gouraguine (m. 2012; div. 2014)

Adele Emily Sandé (/ˈsændeɪ/ SAN-day; previously Gouraguine; born 10 March 1987), known professionally as Emeli Sandé, is a British singer and songwriter. Born in Sunderland, Tyne and Wear, England and raised in Alford, Aberdeenshire, Scotland, Sandé rose to prominence after her guest appearance on Chipmunk's 2009 single "Diamond Rings", which peaked within the top ten of the UK singles chart. The following year, she guest appeared on Wiley's single "Never Be Your Woman", which also peaked within the chart's top ten. In 2012, she received the Brit Awards' Critics' Choice Award.

Sandé's first solo single, "Heaven", was released in August 2011. She peaked atop both the UK singles chart and Irish singles chart twice with her guest appearance on Professor Green's single "Read All About It" that same year, and her 2012 single "Beneath Your Beautiful" (with Labrinth). Her debut studio album, Our Version of Events (2012), spent ten non-consecutive weeks atop the UK albums chart, and, with one million domestic sales, became the best-selling UK album of 2012. That same year, she performed in both the opening and closing ceremonies of the London Olympics. She won Best British Female Solo Artist and British Album of the Year at the 2013 Brit Awards.

Her second studio album, Long Live the Angels (2016), debuted at number two on the UK albums chart. In 2017, she won the Brit Award for Best British Female Solo Artist, becoming her fourth win in total. In 2018, she performed the singing voice of Thethuthinnang in the miniseries Watership Down.

== Early life ==
Adele Emily Sandé was born in Sunderland, to a Zambian father, Joel Sandé, and an English mother, Diane Sandé-Wood, on 10 March 1987. Her father, having moved from Zambia, met her mother while they were both at the polytechnic in Sunderland. The family moved to Alford, Aberdeenshire, Scotland, when she was four.

Sandé wrote her first song at the age of 11, for her primary-school talent show. She remembers that, "was the first time I thought I might be a songwriter. I always knew I wanted to be a musician and I knew I wanted to write because the people I was listening to all wrote. I never thought it was an option to sing anyone else's songs." The first song she wrote was called "Tomorrow Starts Again" – the song had proper structure and even a middle eight.

Sandé attended school at Alford Academy, where her father was a teacher. She said, "I hated to be ill and to miss a day because I was so hungry to learn. I was very shy, nerdy and extremely well-behaved. Inevitably, throughout secondary school, it was part and parcel of my identity that I was Mr. Sandé's daughter. No way could I muck about or get into trouble, because it would've got back to him within minutes. And Dad was strict, let me tell you." Choice FM invited the 15-year-old Sandé to London to take part in their "Rapology" competition. Richard Blackwood also had her down to MTV's Camden studios to sing gospel. It was the first London appearance of her career. By the time she reached the age of 16, she had a record deal with Telstar Records within reach. However, understanding the opportunity that the university could also offer her, she turned down the deal.

Sandé studied medicine, in the five-year MBChB course at the University of Glasgow, but left after obtaining a degree in clinical medicine, specialising in neuroscience. She has stated that education was important to her, because, if her music career failed, she would have something to fall back on. Her manager Adrian Sykes, she said, had waited patiently from when she was 16: "Adrian really respects that I want to get an education behind me. He also knows my parents are keen that I finish university".

There have been many who have inspired Sandé throughout her life. One important influence was Frida Kahlo, so important that she has a tattoo of the artist's portrait on her forearm. Just after leaving medical school, she made the decision to get the tattoo, which, for her, represented strength and bravery. Kahlo was inspirational for Sandé due to the unique story of her battle with polio at a very young age which went on to inspire her artwork. She knew that her decision to pursue music and quit school would require a sense of fearlessness that she gained through Kahlo's expression of art.

== Career ==
=== 2008–2010: Career beginnings ===
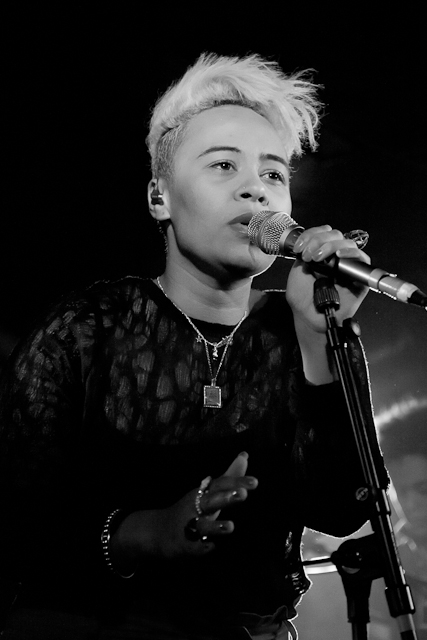
Sandé performing in 2007

Sandé's sister made a video of her playing the piano and singing to one of her favourite songs, "Nasty Little Lady". They sent the clip to Trevor Nelson's BBC Urban music competition. Sandé won the show and was offered a record deal, but the management that she'd met via the competition decided against the deal. Emeli had become involved in the Urban Scot collective who helped and encouraged her career by promoting her in Scotland, and – according to Emeli Sandé: The Biography by David Nolan (2013) – also released an album of songs called Have You Heard? on Glasgow's Souljawn Records, which was sold at gigs. Several tracks were also made available to download.

Her parents also sent BBC Radio 1Xtra a CD of her songs. Ras Kwame played her on his "Homegrown Sessions", and four artists that year were asked to do a show in Soho. She met with Watford-born music producer/writer Shahid Khan a.k.a. Naughty Boy, who had previously worked with Ms Dynamite and Bashy, and they began writing tracks for artists such as Alesha Dixon, Chipmunk, Professor Green, Devlin, Preeya Kalidas, Cheryl Cole, and Tinie Tempah. Sandé soon signed a record deal with Virgin Records and EMI Records.

In an interview, she said, "I was doing a show in London for 1Xtra and I met this guy called Naughty Boy. We got in the studio and we clicked work-wise. We just started writing, not necessarily for me, we just thought 'let's write a pop tune' and experiment. And we wrote the Chipmunk track and I thought nothing of it. Naughty Boy sent it off to Chipmunk who really liked it and wrote his stuff around it." She signed a record deal with Virgin Records in 2010. She later signed another deal with EMI Records in early 2011. Sandé made her singing career debut in 2009 after appearing on the track she wrote for Chipmunk's debut single, "Diamond Rings". The single peaked at number six on the UK singles chart, making it Chipmunk and Sandé's first ever Top 10 hit.

She later sang guest vocals on another single, after collaborating with Wiley on his comeback single "Never Be Your Woman". The single reached number eight on the UK singles chart, becoming Sandé's second consecutive Top 10 Single. Sandé decided against using the name Adele Sandé, due to Adele's growing success, so used her middle name instead. She revealed: "I changed it as soon as Adele came out. I just thought, 'You've kind of taken the [name] now', so I went with my middle name. She was just getting bigger and bigger, so I thought I just really need it."

=== 2011–2013: Our Version of Events and breakthrough ===
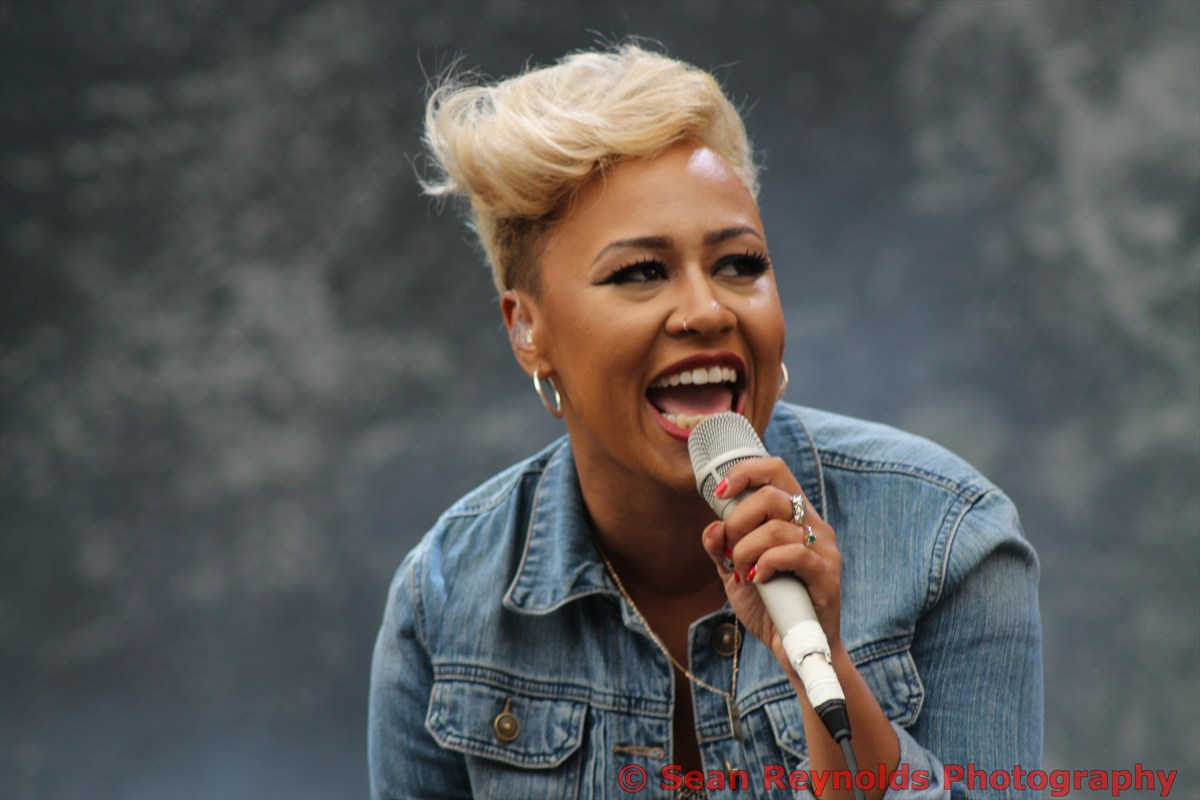
Sandé at 2012 V Festival

Sandé revealed her first solo single would be released in early 2011. There was some speculation surrounding which track she would release after many newspapers stated that it would be "Daddy". The first official single from her upcoming debut album was "Heaven", released on 14 August 2011. The song received positive reviews from blogs such as This Must Be Pop and Robot Pigeon. She confirmed that "Daddy" would be the second official single released from Our Version of Events. Sandé achieved her first number one single on the UK singles chart after "Read All About It" entered at number one.

On 26 November, Sandé performed at the LG ARENA in Birmingham for BRMB 2011. On 15 December 2011, she was named as the Brit Awards Critics' Choice for 2012. Her album Our Version of Events reached number one in the UK after its release in February 2012. Sandé's debut album includes songs written by her and has been reviewed as having "richly melodic, classically powerful, retro-futurist soul-pop songs".

It was announced that she was up for another BRIT Award in 2012, for British Breakthrough Act. Sandé went on to write material for the original line-up of Sugababes. On 24 January 2012, Sandé performed a one-off gig for Q Magazine at XOYO, London. She was supported by British soul singer Michael Kiwanuka. She recorded a version of David Guetta's "Titanium" and the pair performed the song at NRJ Music Awards in France. Sandé has penned a track for Naughty Boy's upcoming LP entitled "Hollywood" which features soul singer Gabrielle. It is about fame coming and going and will be released in November.

On 27 July 2012, Sandé sang "Abide with Me" at the opening ceremony of the 2012 Summer Olympics, and her song "Heaven" was used to accompany the section with Sir Tim Berners-Lee. Both appear on the Isles of Wonder CD of the opening ceremony's music. NBC also used her song "Wonder" during the credits roll at the end of the tape-delayed ceremony broadcast in the United States. On 12 August 2012, Sandé sang "Read All About It (Part III)" at the closing ceremony, while a video montage of emotional scenes from the games was shown. She also covered a version of John Lennon's "Imagine" exclusively for the BBC, who used it for their end credits montage at the conclusion of their Olympics coverage. Sandé is a winner of the 2013 European Border Breakers Awards. The European Border Breakers Awards honour the best new music acts in Europe. The award ceremony takes place at the Eurosonic Noorderslag music festival in Groningen (NL). She won two BRIT 2013 awards for Best British Female and Best British Album. In January 2013 it was revealed that Ella Henderson has anticipated work with Sandé on her debut album. The song "Next To Me" won two Ivor Novello Awards for "Best Song Musically and Lyrically" and "PRS for Music Most Performed Work" in 2013.

=== 2013–2017: Long Live the Angels and community presence ===
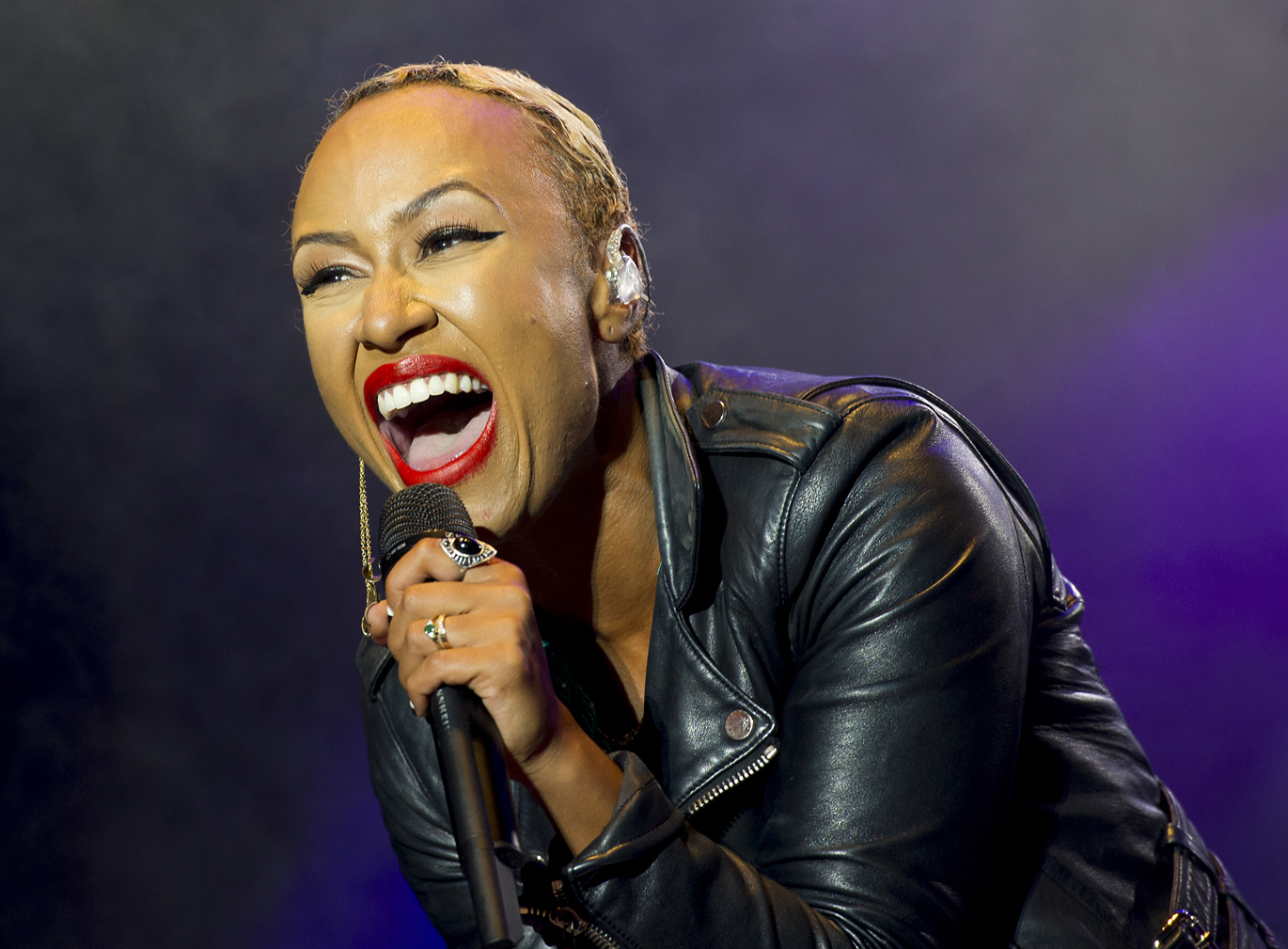
Sandé at the 2013 Gibraltar Music Festival

In May 2013, she performed at the White House in Washington, D.C., as one of the featured artists at the award ceremony when President Obama presented Carole King with the Library of Congress Gershwin Medal. In June 2013, Sandé started writing her second upcoming studio album, which was released in 2016. She had already written several songs, including "Pluto" with Naughty Boy, "Enough", "Call Me What You Like", "You and Me" and "This Much Is True", which was written for her former husband, Adam. During U.S. Summer Tour in July 2013, Sandé performed "Free" from Rudimental's album Home, "Lifted" from Naughty Boy's album Hotel Cabana.

With her speedy success worldwide and especially between the UK and the US, Sandé has been a presence in many important campaigns, aside from her powerful stance on social justice through her songwriting. Whether through performances at fundraising concerts or campaigns of her own, she backs up her lyrics of social change and equality with action. With the honour of performing at Elton John's AIDS Foundation Event in 2013, she has shown her support in raising money and awareness for the HIV/AIDS problem in the world. More specifically, she understands the seriousness of HIV/AIDS in her father's home origin of Zambia which provides a deeper passion to support the cause. She is also one face of Fashion Targets Breast Cancer in the effort to also create awareness and funding for the fight against breast cancer. More recently, Sandé has helped launch a programme of her own called "Community Clavinova", a nationwide opportunity for organizations of many kinds to receive free Clavinovas through the partnership of Sandé and Yamaha UK. As a passionate musician, she understands the importance of having resources and is excited to help provide groups with the opportunity to receive such a great contribution to their organizations.

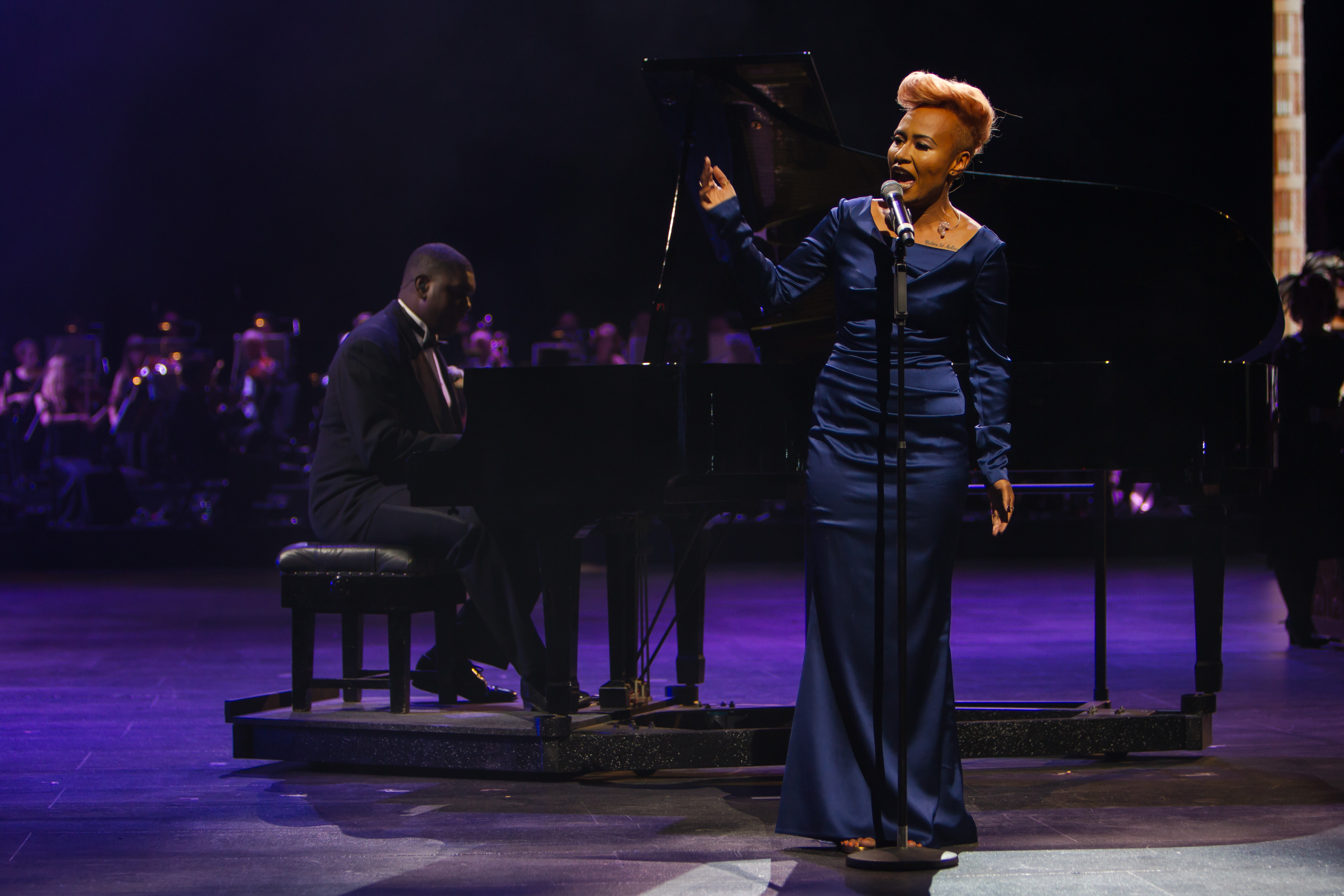
Sandé performin at Jaguar XE – Arrival in London in 2014

In 2013, Sandé revealed that she has been working on her second studio album, stated to be released in 2016. On 15 November 2014, Sandé joined the charity group Band Aid 30 along with other British and Irish pop acts, recording the latest version of the track "Do They Know It's Christmas?" at Sarm West Studios in Notting Hill, London, to raise money for the 2014 Ebola crisis in Western Africa.

On 25 August 2016, Sandé shared a preview of a song from her upcoming album entitled 'Intermission' on her social media accounts, with the caption "Inhale, exhale, release and let yourself receive forgiveness." Following a number of teasers, it was announced that "Hurts" would be released on 16 September as the lead single. Describing the song, she said: "I wanted to release 'Hurts' first because it felt like everything I've avoided saying for so long. It's a real explosion. It's everything I wish I'd said years and years ago. I didn't want to hold anything back anymore." On 15 September, Sandé announced on her social media accounts that her new album would be called 'Long Live The Angels' and that it would be released on 11 November 2016. Her song "Hurts" from the album Long Live the Angels was published on 5 October. The album was released on the proposed date. The album debuted at number two on the UK albums chart. The following year, Sandé gave her Long Live the Angels Tour, which was her first to include Arena dates.

In 2017, she received the Brit Awards' Best British Female Solo Artist award, becoming her fourth win in total. On 2 October 2017, Sandé was also awarded a BASCA Gold Badge award in recognition of her unique contribution to music.

=== 2019–present: Real Life, Let's Say for Instance, and How Were We to Know ===
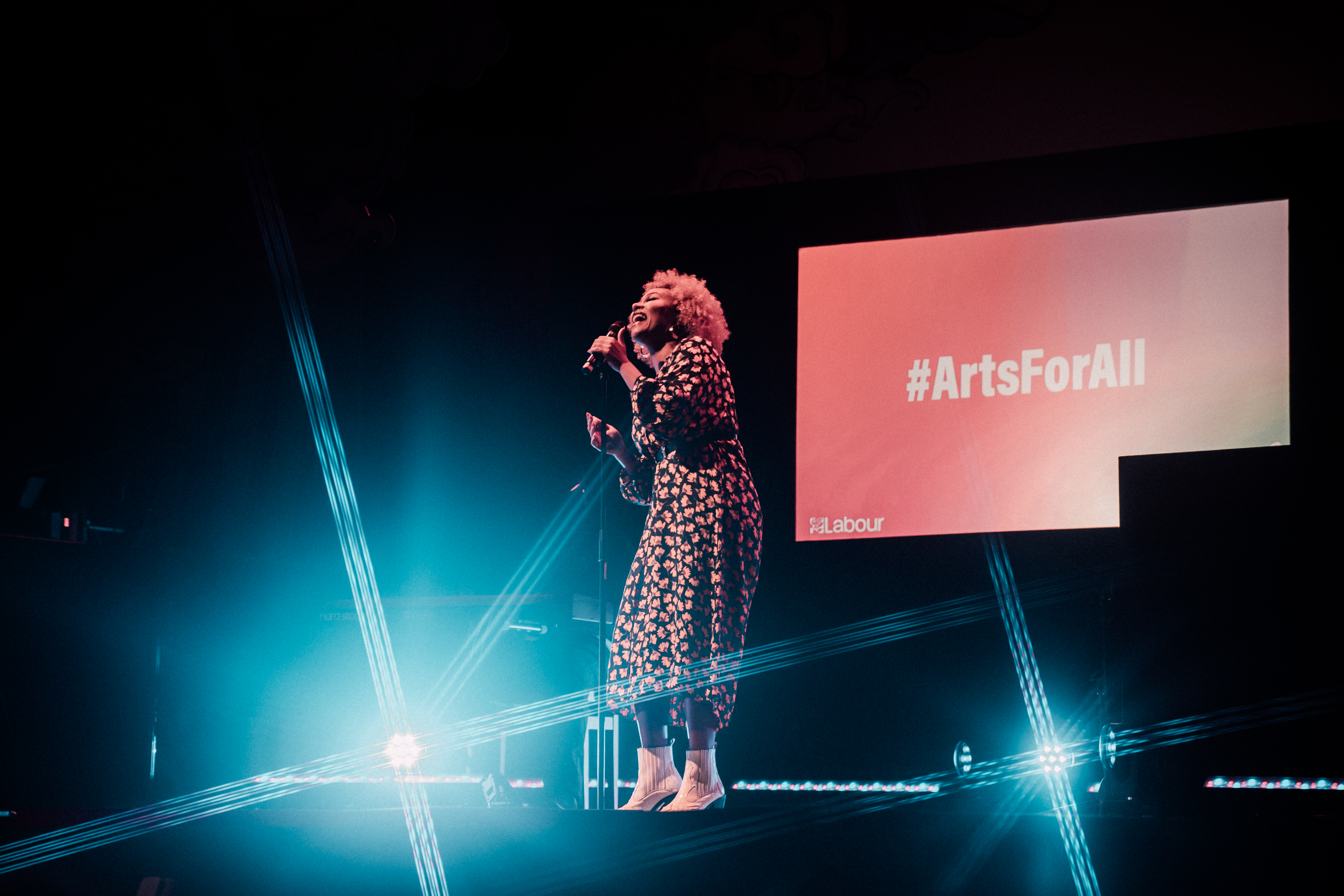
Sandé performing at Labour's Charter for the Arts in 2019

On 12 April 2019, Emeli Sandé announced her third album, Real Life, out 7 June on Virgin/EMI/Universal Music, recorded following an intense personal journey of self-doubt and self-discovery.

On 23 May 2019, the track "Extraordinary Being" from the upcoming album was released as the soundtrack for the film X-Men – Dark Phoenix. On 13 September 2019, Sandé released Real Life, her third studio album, anticipated by two promotional singles "Shine" and "You Are Not Alone". In the UK, the album debuted at number six on the UK albums chart, with sales of 7,650 combined units, the lowest debut for the singer on that chart to date.

In February 2021, Emeli Sande split from record label EMI and signed a contract with independent record label Chrysalis Records. On 16 September 2021, she released the video of the single "Family". On 26 October 2021, she published the duet with Jaykae "Look What You've Done". In January 2022 Sandé published the promotional single "Brighter Days" and announced that her fourth studio album Let's Say for Instance would be released on 6 May 2022.

In 2023, Sandé released her fifth album, titled How Were We to Know to mostly positive reviews.

In November 2024, Sandé released "Roots" via her own label, Venus Records

== Artistry ==
=== Musical style ===
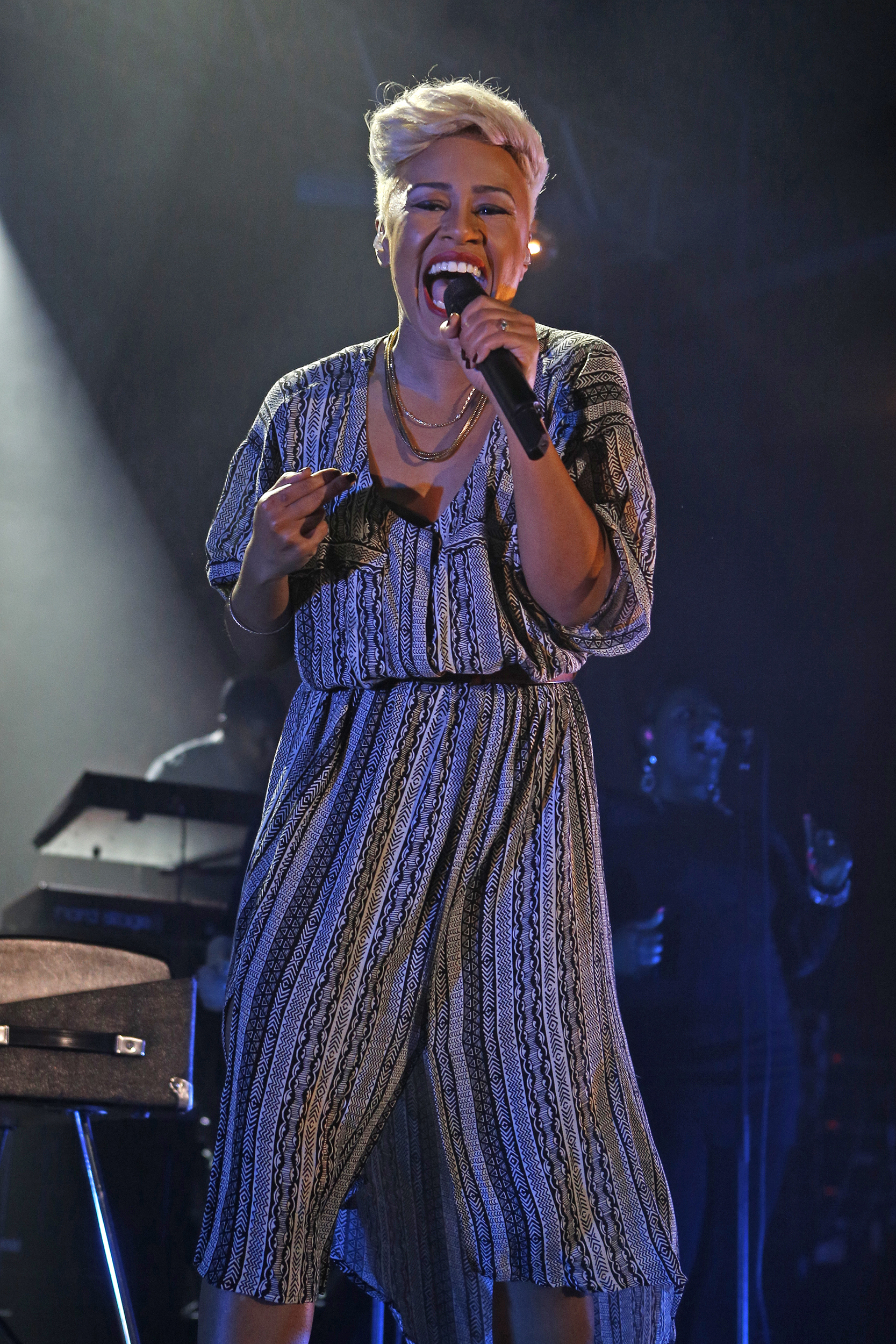
Sandé performing in Germany, 2013

Sandé possesses a soprano vocal range. Sandé has said she wants her music to be remembered like that of Nina Simone, one of her favourite artists. Sandé was first exposed to Simone at the age of eight, hearing her perform the song "Why?" after the assassination of Martin Luther King Jr. After hearing such sorrowful yet uplifting lyrics and expression through Simone's performance, Sandé was inspired to have a similar future with her music career. She said, as much as she would like, she would never play the piano as well as Simone, but she would give it her best shot. She loves the songs Simone produced, including "I Wish I Knew How It Would Feel to Be Free" and Simone's version of "I Think It's Going to Rain Today". She said that Simone's original songs are very poetic: "So when I listen to commercial stuff at the moment, I'm just thinking 'haven't you heard Nina Simone, haven't you heard how a song should be written?'"

Sandé began working in the studio with Naughty Boy in 2009, where the pair first worked together on Chipmunk's debut album, I Am Chipmunk. She said that she wanted the songs on her debut album to be fresh and she wanted to try and take it back how she wrote songs at the beginning of her career. Sandé had classical music training as a songwriter in her teens and learnt to play the piano at an early age, and getting across that she played, made and wrote her own music was very important to her. She said on the album, she wanted people to see every side of her as an artist, so it was important to have songs there where there could be a real connection with the lyric, rather than there just being throwaway pop music. Joni Mitchell and Lauryn Hill were also major influences for the album.

=== Songwriting ===
I have just finished a song with Cher Lloyd, called Lifetime, for her new album. I have another on Leona Lewis's next album and one that has been recorded by Susan Boyle. That's probably my proudest moment. Susan recorded my song, called This Will Be The Year, last week, for her next album. There is another called River, which I am hoping she's going to record.

— Emeli Sandé

While making her debut album, Sandé began to work with Tinie Tempah. She co-wrote "Let Go", on which she provided guest vocals. She also started working with Devlin after recording a song titled "Dreamer". Sandé later revealed she would be working on Alesha Dixon's album The Entertainer. She co-wrote the hit single "Radio" with Shahid Khan and co-wrote tracks on Cheryl Cole's albums as well as Professor Green's album, which Sandé gave guest vocals on. In 2011 she said that she was Simon Cowell's favourite songwriter at that moment due to her writing songs for Leona Lewis and Susan Boyle. In an interview, Sandé said, after writing songs for Boyle, "I haven't met her yet. I just sent her the song. I'd love to meet her because I think she is a bit of a rock star." Sandé co-wrote "This Will Be The Year" for Boyle and songs for Leona called "Trouble" and "Mountains". It was revealed after Professor Green announced the track list for his album At Your Inconvenience that Sandé would feature on the first single from the album, "Read All About It". The single was released in October 2011 before the album was released. The pair also performed the song live on The X Factor results show. She draws on influences for her music from Nina Simone, Joni Mitchell, Lauryn Hill and Amy Winehouse. Sandé said that all her songs were about world peace and political issues. Sandé said that the key to a good song is using "honesty" and "raw emotion" as the best way to write. She said that if she attempts to write something which is "too smart", the creative process will not work for her. "Kill the Boy" was one of the first ideas that came to Sandé's head. She said if she has to work on a song longer than a day, she will not go back to it, as she said it won't work. She went on to say if it was to work, that the idea for the song would be almost instant.

== Personal life ==
In January 2012, Sandé confirmed that she was engaged to her then unidentified boyfriend of seven years. Her boyfriend had requested not to be identified and Sandé said that he was not in the music industry but was a scientist. Sandé's fiancé was revealed as marine biologist Adam Gouraguine when the pair married in his home nation of Montenegro on 15 September 2012. Sandé said she would legally take his name, but would still be known professionally as Emeli Sandé. In November 2014, Sandé revealed that the couple had divorced after two years.

Sandé was appointed Member of the Order of the British Empire (MBE) in the 2017 Birthday Honours for services to music.

On 23 May 2019, it was announced that Sandé has been appointed as the new chancellor of the University of Sunderland.

On 31 March 2022, Sandé confirmed in an interview with Metro that she was in a relationship with an unidentified female classical pianist. When asked if this means she is bisexual, she responded, "I'm not sure what I identify as but I guess so. I just feel like I should fall in love with whoever I fall in love with." In September 2022, Sandé announced her engagement to her partner, classical pianist Yoana Karemova. In November 2023, Sandé announced that the two had postponed their wedding due to Sandé being busy with her upcoming album and the related tour dates. Sandé and Karemova ended their relationship in summer 2025.

== Discography ==
- Our Version of Events (2012)
- Long Live the Angels (2016)
- Real Life (2019)
- Let's Say for Instance (2022)
- How Were We to Know (2023)
- Album 6 TBC (2026)

== Tours ==
Headlining

- Our Version of Events Tour (2011–2013)
- Long Live the Angels Tour (2017)
- Real Life World Tour (2019–2020)

Supporting

- Coldplay – Mylo Xyloto Tour (2011–2012)
- Westlife – The Wild Dreams Tour (2022)
