= List of songs written or produced by Naughty Boy =

British record producer and recording artist Shahid "Naughty Boy" Khan has written and/or produced a total of 49 songs that have been assigned to artists, as well as writing and producing other material which is awaiting allocation. After signing as a songwriter to Sony ATV and then to Virgin Records (now Virgin EMI), Khan established his production company "Naughty Boy Recordings" and production name, and began to write and produce music commercially circa 2008. He got his big break in 2008–09, producing "Diamond Rings", a UK top-ten hit by British grime artist Chipmunk and a then-unknown session singer called Emeli Sandé. He also produced a remix of British R&B singer-songwriter Taio Cruz's 2008 single "Come On Girl". This was followed this in 2010 with his own top-ten hit single, "Never Be Your Woman" featuring British rapper Wiley and Sandé. 2010 would also establish Naughty Boy and Sandé's writing partnership, with the duo working on "Dreamer", "End of Days" and "Yesterday's News" for Devlin's album Bud, Sweat and Beers, Tinie Tempah's "Let's Go" from Disc-Overy, "Radio" for Alesha Dixon, "Kids Love to Dance" for Professor Green's Alive Till I'm Dead album and "Til the End" from Tinchy Stryder's Third Strike album.

2011 remained quiet in terms of commercial releases as Naughty Boy worked on his own album and Sandé debut album. The latter, Our Version of Events, was released in 2012 and was largely a collaboration between Naughty Boy and Sandé. The album would become a success amongst music critics with Metacritic awarding the album a weighted mean score of 67/100. The album was also a large commercial success, selling 1.2 million copies by December 2012 and in April 2013, the Official Charts Company revealed that Our Version of Events had beaten the record for the debut album that had spent the most consecutive weeks in the top-ten on the UK Albums Chart a record previously held by The Beatles' Please Please Me album. It was not until its 66th week on the chart, that the album dropped out of the top-ten. In 2012, the duo also respectively wrote and produced "Trouble", the lead single from Glassheart (2012), the third studio album by British series 3 X Factor winner, Leona Lewis. Another song by the duo called "Mountains" was originally intended for Lewis, but was later reclaimed for Sandé's Our Version of Events. In the latter part of 2012, Naughty Boy also wrote/produced "Half of Me" for Bajan singer Rihanna's seventh album Unapologetic and "Side Effects of You" for American entertainer Fantasia Burrino. Naughty Boy also wrote "Craziest Things" with will.i.am for former Girls Aloud member Cheryl Cole.

Naughty Boy has also co-written songs for his own debut album Hotel Cabana (2013). Eight of the songs are co-written with and feature vocals from Sandé. On the album he also wrote with Andrea Martin, whom had previously collaborated with Naughty Boy for "When it Hurts", another track from Lewis' album Glassheart. Tempah and Professor Green also co-wrote tracks with him, after he previously produced for their albums. Other new collaborators include Ella Eyre, Wiz Khalifa, Bastille, Chasing Grace, Tanika, Maiday, Mic Righteous, Gabrielle, Sam Smith and Wretch 32. Prior to release, Hotel Cabana has produced three top-ten singles, "Wonder" and "Lifted", both featuring Sandé and "La La La" (featuring Smith), which topped the UK Singles Chart. 2013 also saw Naughty Boy resume to work with other artists including Britney Spears, in joint sessions with William Orbit, and Lily Allen.

== Songs ==
Key
| † | Indicates single release |
| § | Indicates a remix produced by Naughty Boy |

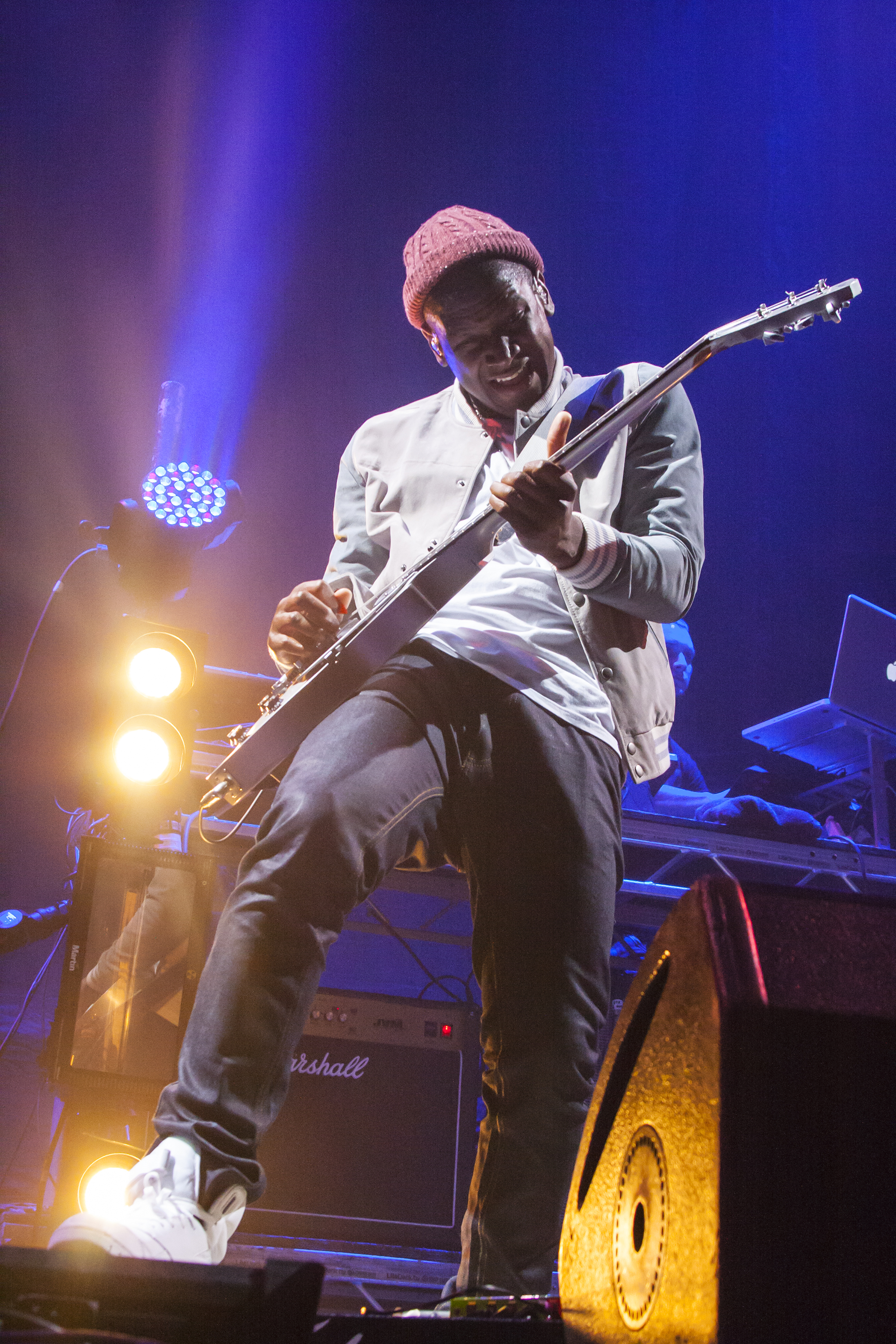
Labrinth's single "Beneath Your Beautiful", featuring Emeli Sandé, was remixed by Naughty Boy.

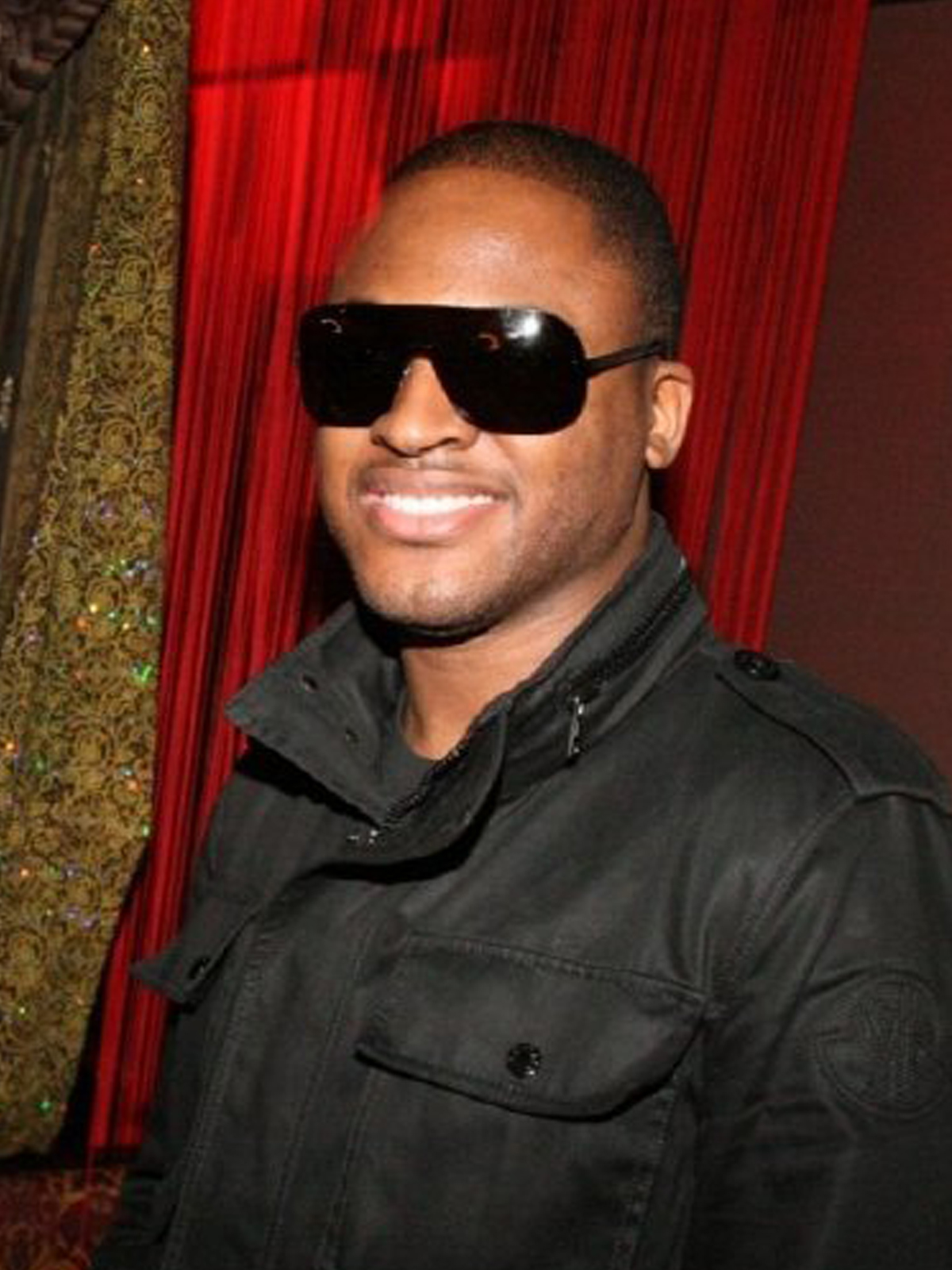
Taio Cruz's 2008 single "Come On Girl" also received the Naughty Boy remix treatment.

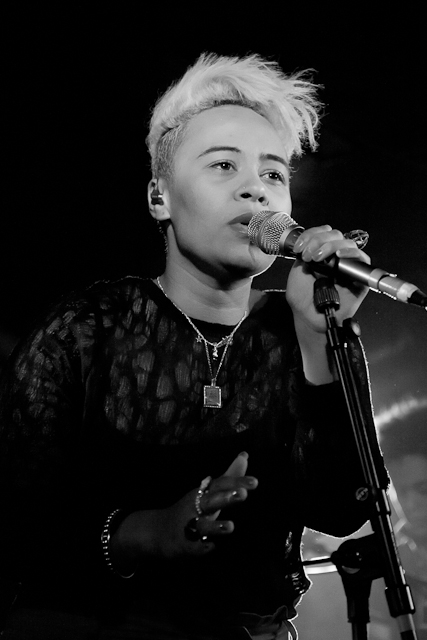
Emeli Sandé has frequently collaborated with Naughty Boy on her own and his own debut album; they have also collaborated numerous times for other artists.

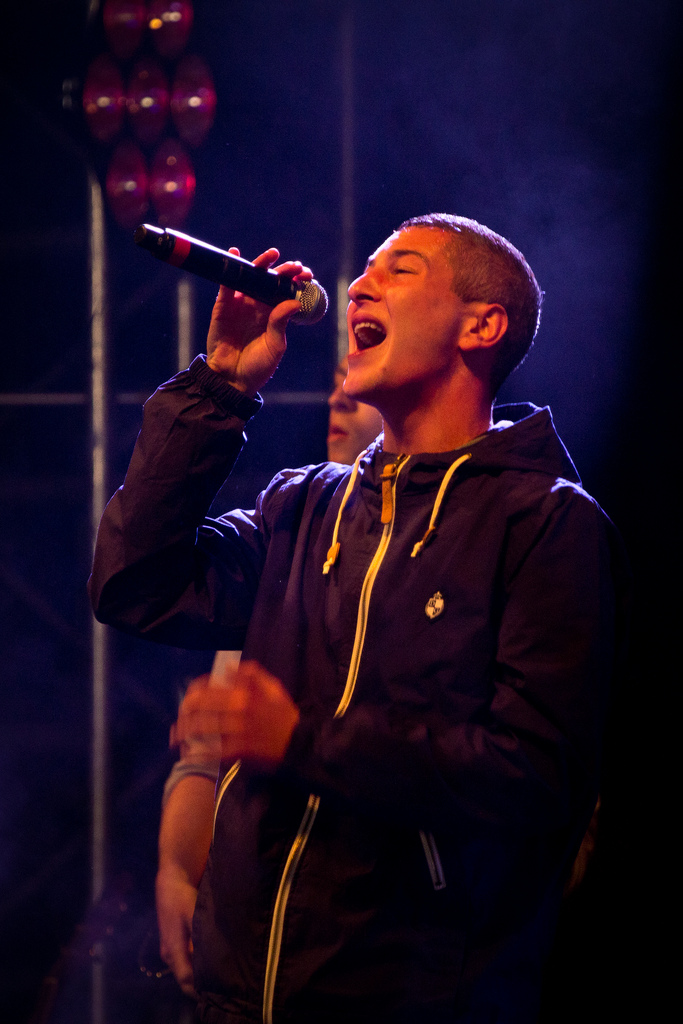
Devlin was one of Naughty Boy's earliest collaborators.

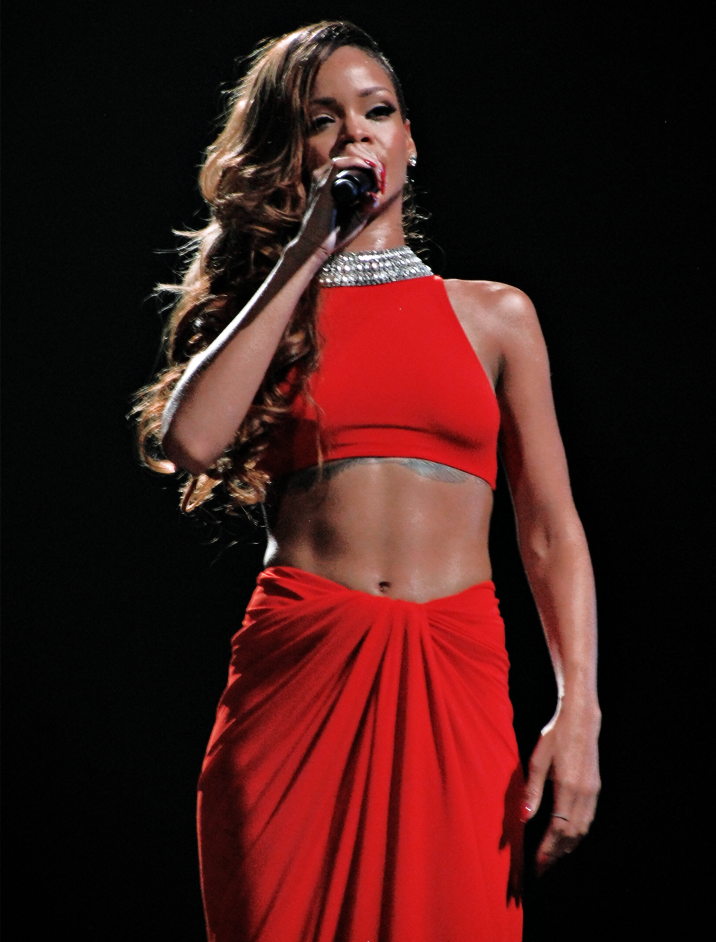
Rihanna recorded "Half of Me", a co-production between Naughty Boy and StarGate.

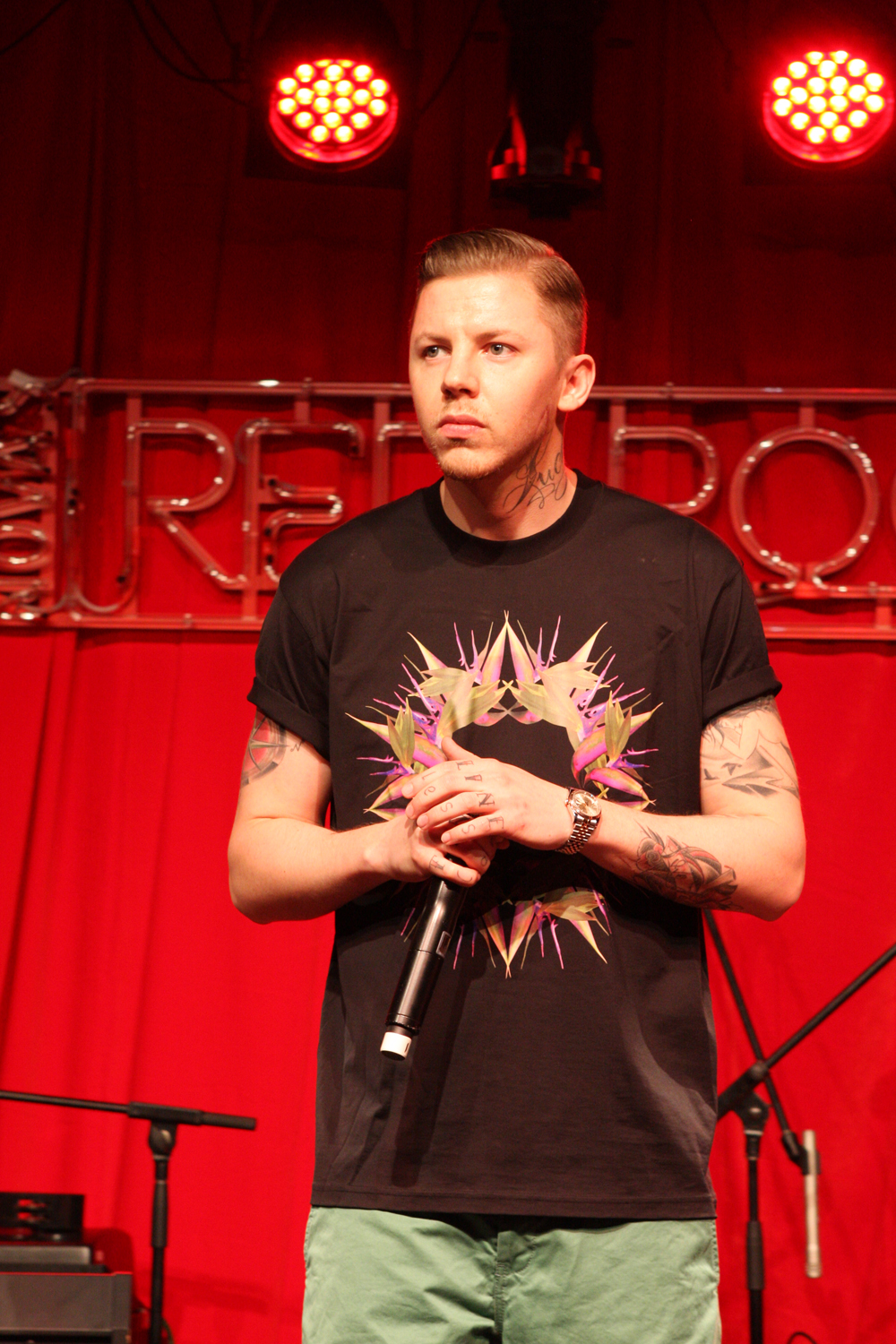
Professor Green worked with Naughty Boy on a Sandé collaboration ("Kids Love to Dance") which led to Green and Sandé working together several more times.

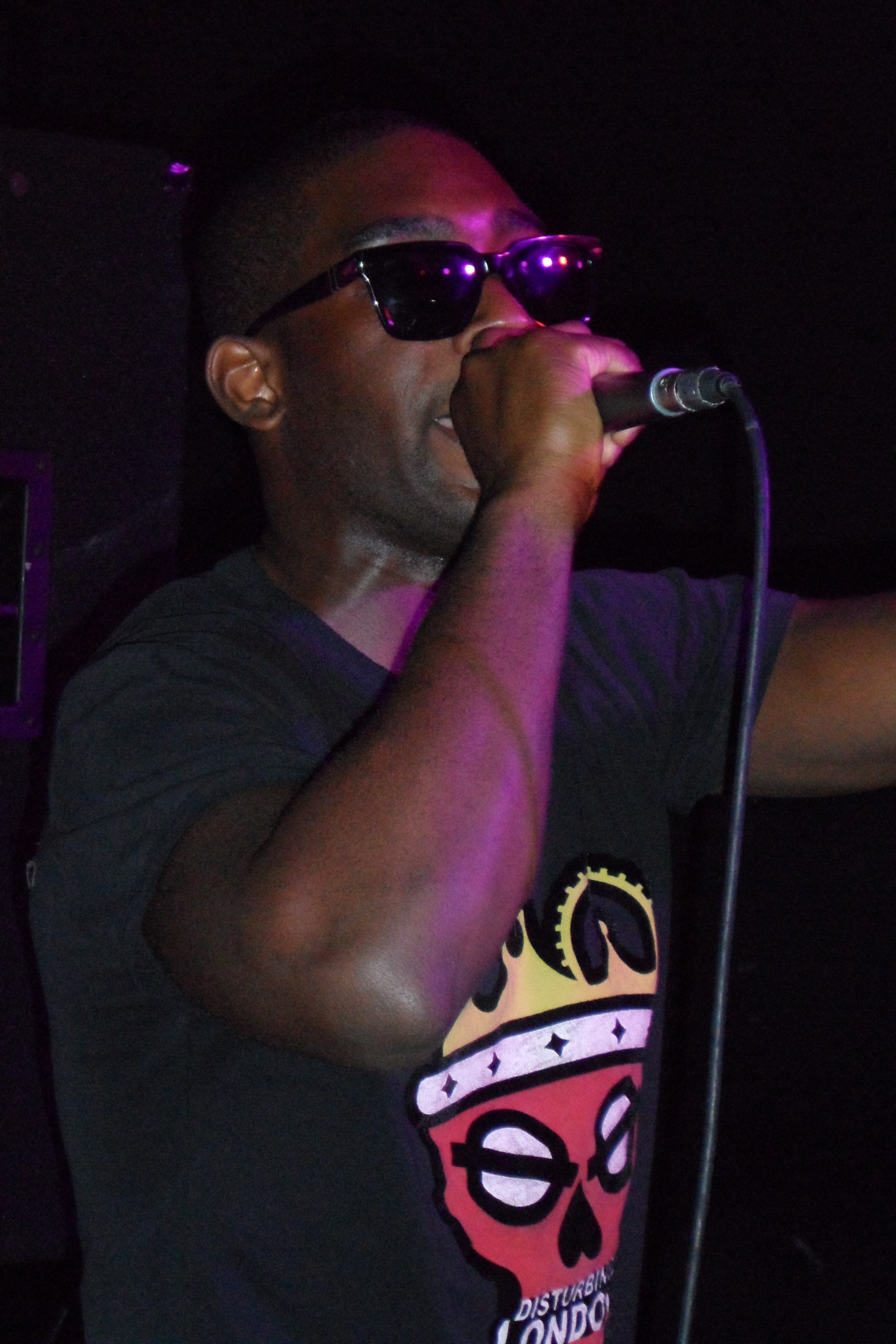
Naughty Boy produced "Let Go" (featuring Emeli Sandé) for Tinie Tempah's debut album, Disc-Overy, as well as three tracks for Demonstration.

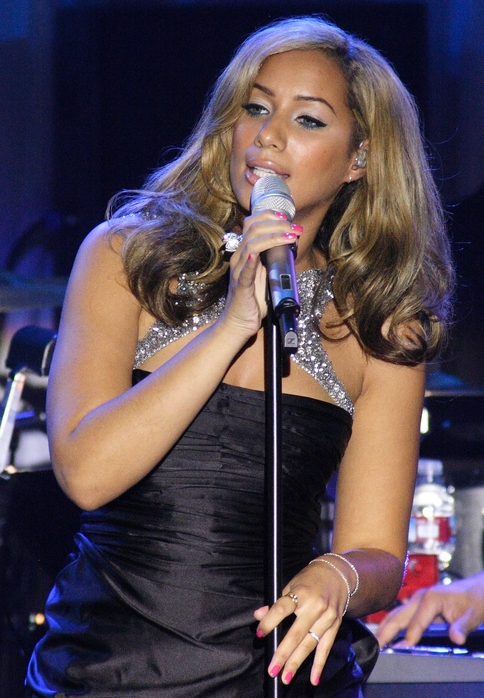
Naughty Boy produced "Trouble" and "When It Hurts" for Leona Lewis' 2012 album, Glassheart.

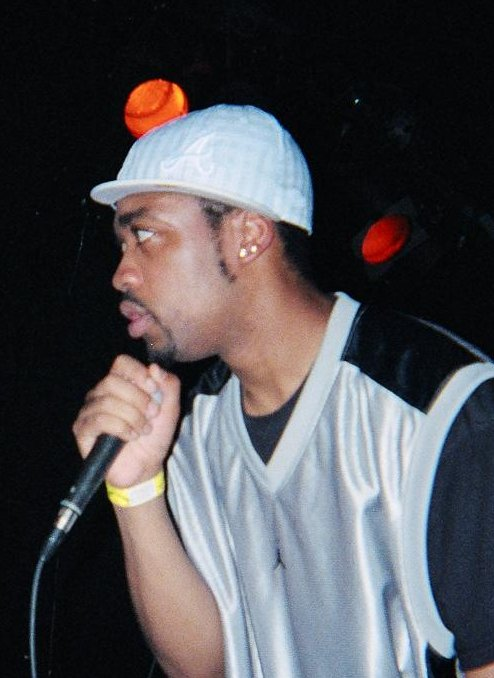
Naughty Boy's commercial success as a lead artist came with his 2010 Wiley and Sandé collaboration "Never Be Your Woman".

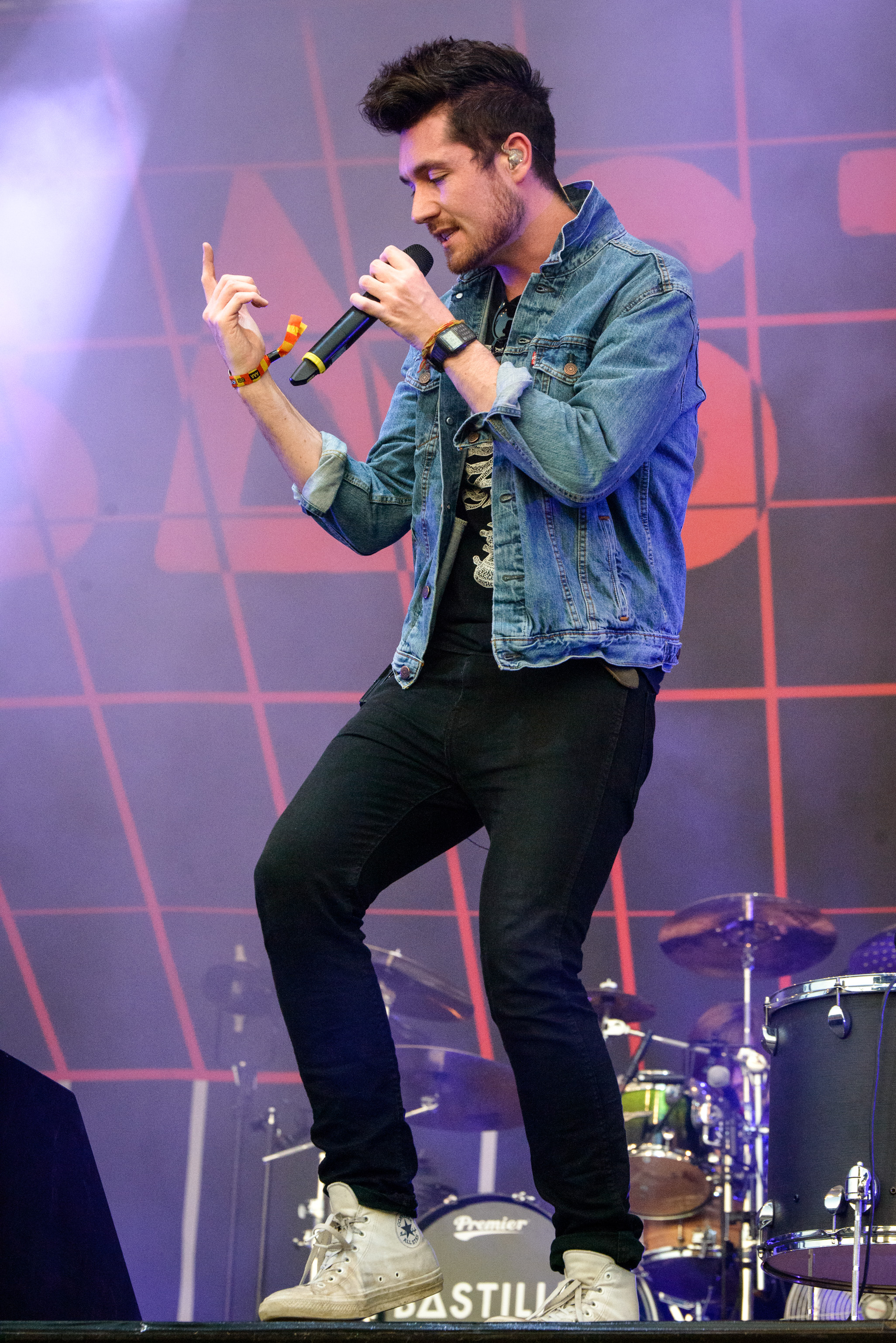
Naughty Boy collaborated with British Indie band Bastille who debuted their own album Bad Blood in 2013.

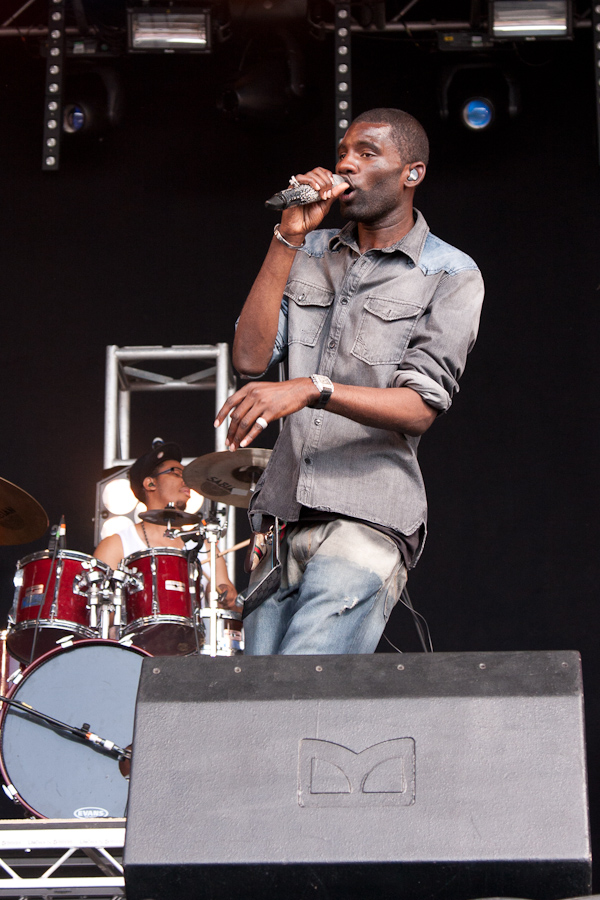
Wretch 32 joins Emeli Sandé on "Pluto", one of the most critically acclaimed songs on Naughty Boy's album Hotel Cabana.

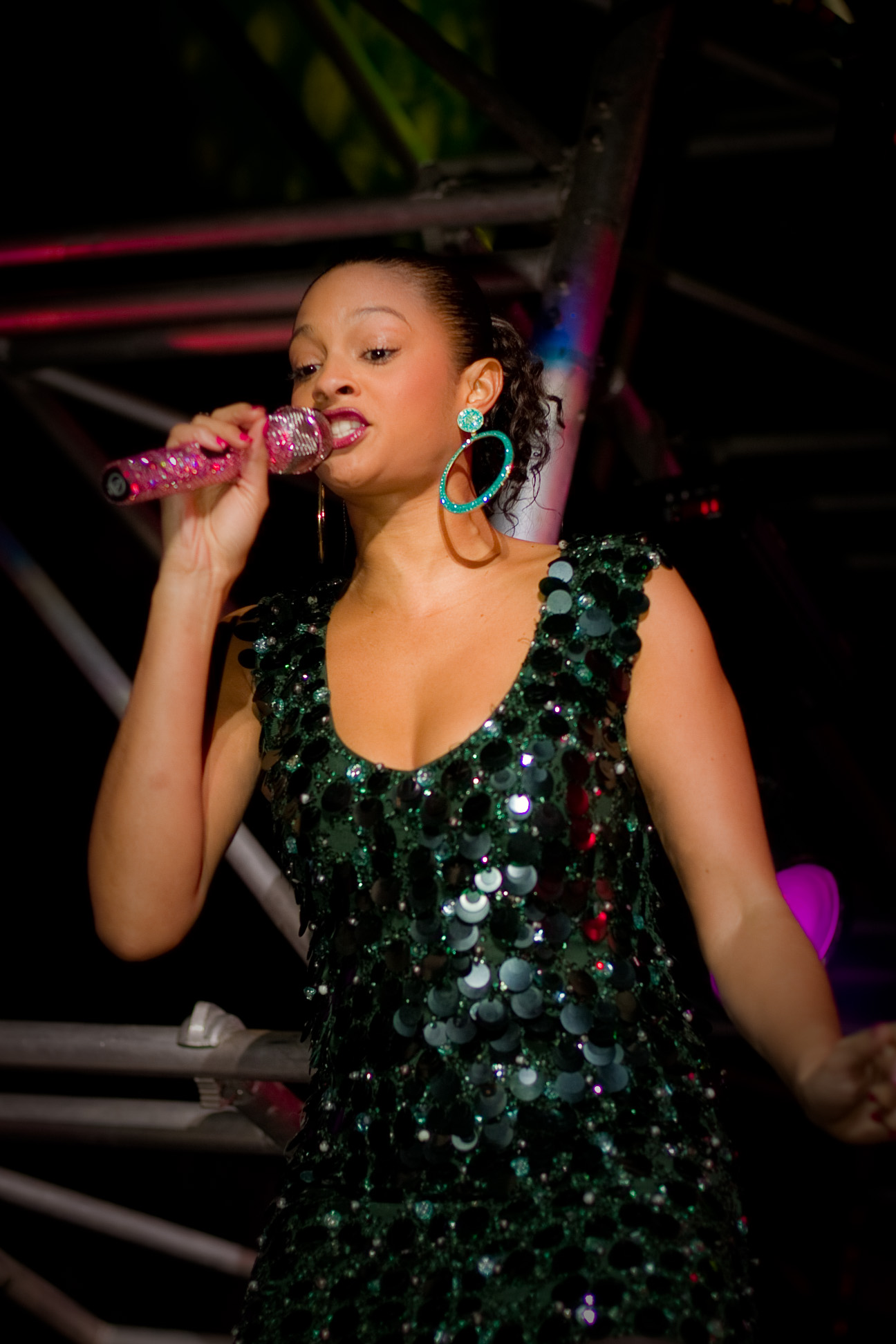
Naughty Boy produced "Radio", and its official KLAAS Remix featuring Wiley, for Alesha Dixon (pictured).

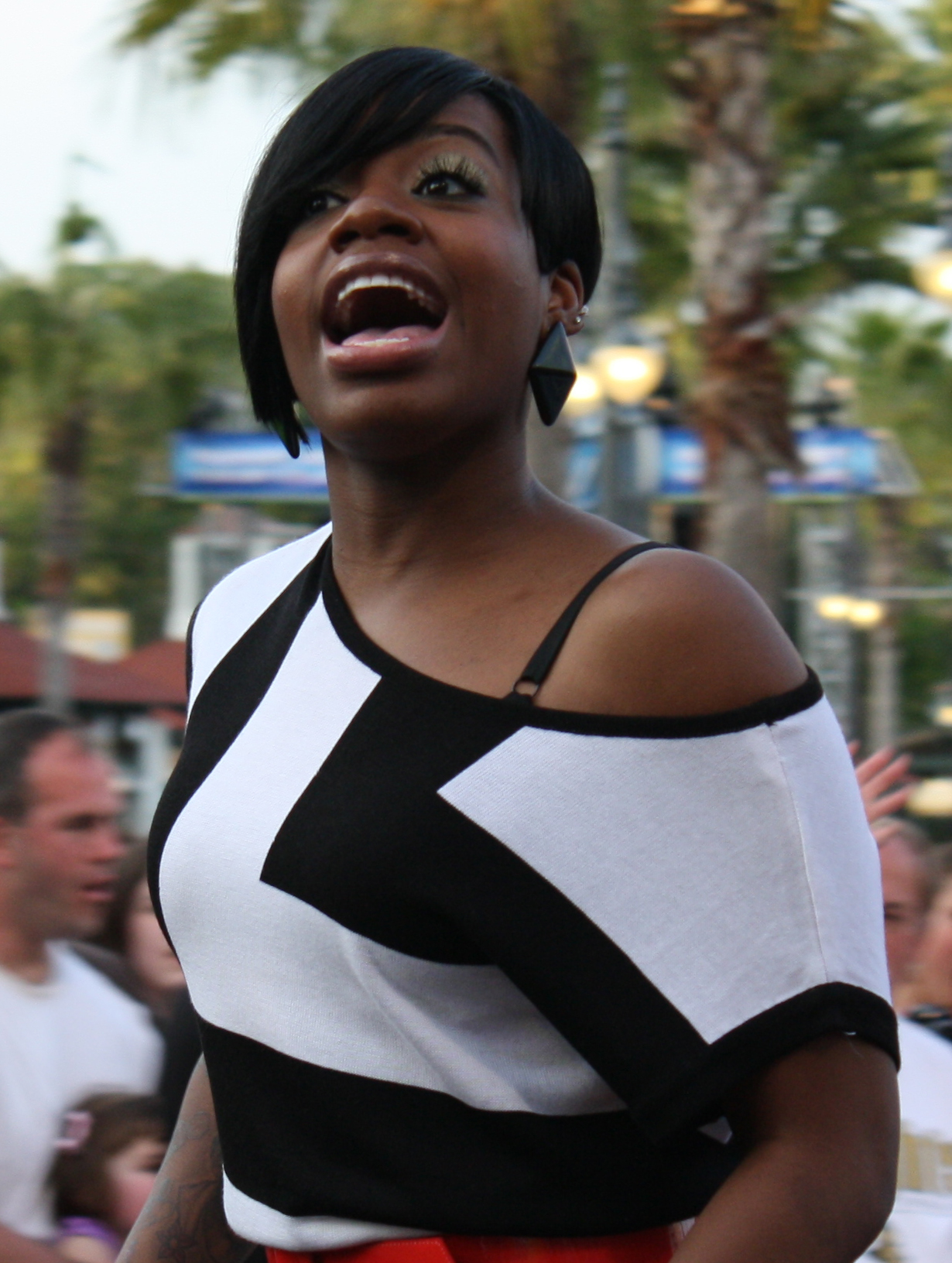
"Side Effects of You" is one of Naughty Boy's high-profile international productions for American entertainer Fantasia Burrino.

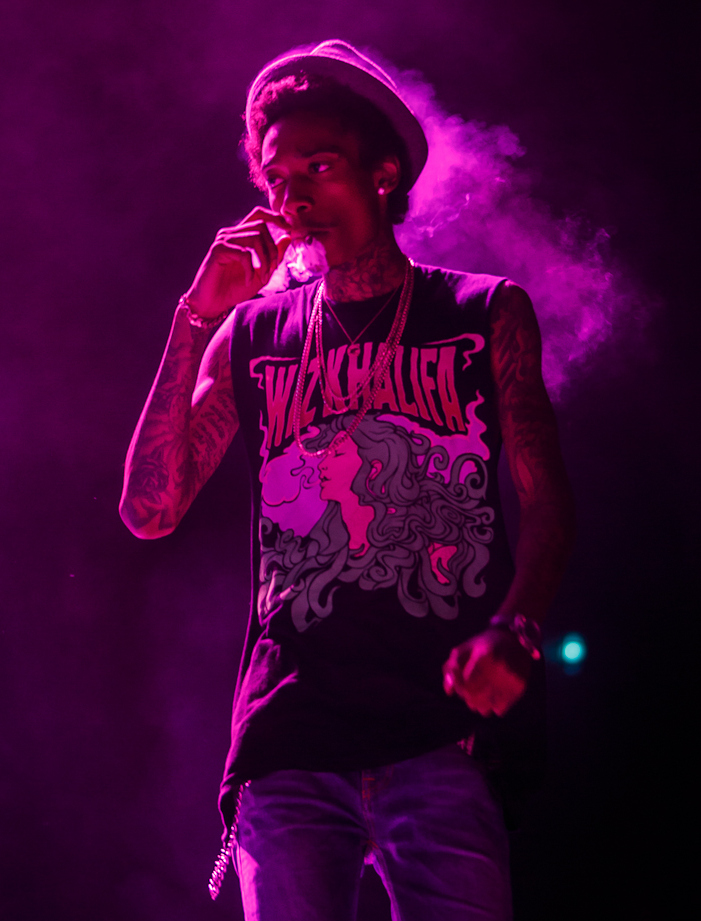
Naughty Boy called on Wiz Khalifa (pictured) and Ella Eyre for "Think About It" a song from the producer's own album Hotel Cabana.

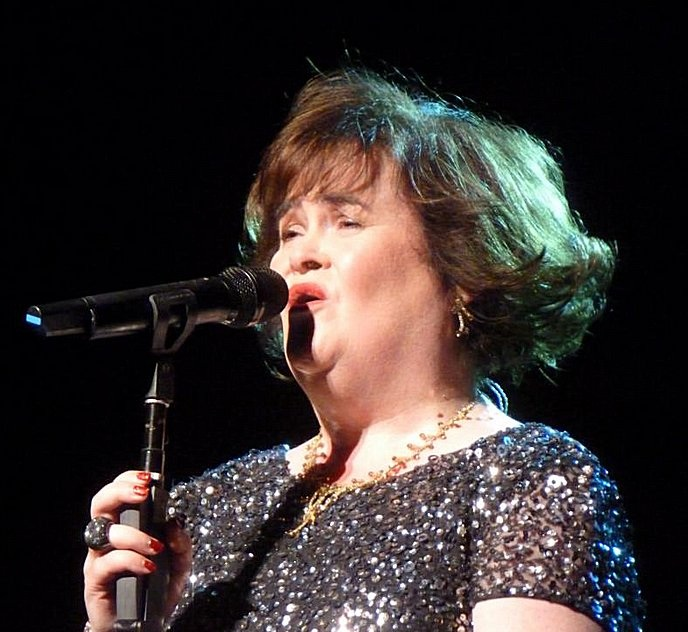
Naughty Boy and Emeli Sandé co-wrote "This Will be the Year" for Britain's Got Talent runner-up Susan Boyle. It would be the first of many collaborations for artists on Simon Cowell's record label, Syco Music.

Table of song recordings written and/or produced by Shahid "Naughty Boy" Khan, including releasing artist and album.
| Song | Year | Artist | Album / Release | Writers | Producers | Ref |
|---|---|---|---|---|---|---|
| "A Heart Can Save the World" | 2013 | Tinie Tempah; (featuring Emeli Sandé) | Demonstration | Patrick Okogwu; Emeli Sandé; Shahid Khan; James Murray; Mustafa Omer; Harry Craze; Hugo Chegwin | Naughty Boy; Craze & Hoax; Mojam | |
| "Act I" | 2013 | Naughty Boy; (featuring George the Poet) | Hotel Cabana | Shahid Khan; George Mpanga | Naughty Boy | |
| "Act II" | 2013 | Naughty Boy; (featuring George the Poet) | Hotel Cabana | Shahid Khan; George Mpanga | Naughty Boy | |
| "Ancient" | 2012 | Loick Essien | —N/a | Loick Essien; Shahid Khan; Eric Dawkins | Naughty Boy; Eric Dawkins | |
| "Be Kind" | —N/a | —N/a | —N/a | Felix Howard; Shahid Khan; Emeli Sandé | —N/a | |
| "Beneath Your Beautiful" §; (Naughty Boy Remix) | 2013 | Labrinth; (featuring Emeli Sandé and George the Poet) | Remixes EP; CD single release | Timothy McKenzie; Emeli Sandé; Mike Posner; George Mpanga | Labrinth; Da Diggler; Naughty Boy (add. production) | |
| "Breaking the Law" | 2012 | Emeli Sandé | Our Version of Events | Ben Harrison; Shahid Khan; Emeli Sandé | Naughty Boy | |
| "Breaking the Law" (New Version) | 2012 | Emeli Sandé | Our Version of Events | Ben Harrison; Shahid Khan; Emeli Sandé | Naughty Boy | |
| "Come On Girl" §; (Naughty Boy Remix) | 2008 | Taio Cruz; (featuring Bashy) | CD single | Taio Cruz; Ashley Thomas | Taio Cruz, Naughty Boy (add. production) | |
| "Craziest Things" | 2012 | Cheryl Cole; (featuring will.i.am) | A Million Lights | William Adams; Cheryl Cole; Shahid Khan; Andrea Martin | Will.i.am | |
| "Clown" † | 2012 | Emeli Sandé | Our Version of Events | Shahid Khan; Grant Mitchell; Emeli Sande | Naughty Boy | |
| "Daddy" † | 2012 | Emeli Sandé; (featuring Naughty Boy) | Our Version of Events | Shahid Khan; Grant Mitchell; James Murray; Mustafa Omer; Emeli Sandé | Naughty Boy | |
| "Delicate" | —N/a | —N/a | —N/a | Shahid Khan; Sam Smith | —N/a | |
| "Diamond Rings" † | 2008 | Chipmunk; (featuring Emeli Sandé) | I Am Chipmunk | Jahmaal Fyffe; Shahid Khan; Emeli Sandé | Naughty Boy | |
| "Dreamer" | 2010 | Devlin; (featuring Emeli Sandé) | Bud, Sweat and Beers | James Devlin; Shahid Khan; Emeli Sandé | Naughty boy | |
| "Elizabeth" | —N/a | —N/a | —N/a | Shahid Khan; Alfred Millar; Philip Plested | —N/a | |
| "End of Days" | 2010 | Devlin | Bud, Sweat and Beers | James Devlin; Shahid Khan | Naughty Boy | |
| "Epilogue" | 2013 | Naughty Boy; (featuring George the Poet) | Hotel Cabana | Shahid Khan; George Mpanga | Naughty Boy | |
| "Find a Boy" | 2012 | A*M*E; (featuring Mic Righteous) | —N/a | Shahid Khan; Aminata Kabba; Emeli Sandé; Rocky Takalobighashi | Naughty Boy | |
| "Gift & Curse" | 2013 | Devlin; (featuring Chasing Grace) | A Moving Picture | James Devlin; Grace Ackerman; Philip Plested; Shahid Khan; Phil Leigh | Naughty Boy; Phil Leigh | |
| "Half of Me" | 2012 | Rihanna | Unapologetic | Shahid Khan; Emeli Sandé; Mikkel S. Eriksen; Tor Erik Hermansen | Naughty Boy; StarGate | |
| "Heartland" † | 2017 | Tom Walker | —N/a | Fiona Bevan; Shahid Khan; Wesley Muoria-Chaves; Thomas Walker | Naughty Boy | |
| "Heaven" † | 2012 | Emeli Sandé | Our Version of Events | Hugo Chegwin; Harry Craze; Shahid Khan; Emeli Sandé; Mike Spencer | Mike Spencer | |
| "Helicopters & Planes" † | 2012 | Josh Kumra; (featuring K Koke) | Good Things Come to Those Who Don't Wait | Shahid Khan; Emeli Sande; Sherazz Amin | Blazing Beats; Naughty Boy; Jim Duguid (vocal prod.); Josh Kumra (vocal prod.) | |
| "Heroes" | 2013 | Tinie Tempah; (featuring Laura Mvula) | Demonstration | Patrick Okogwu; Laura Mvula; Shahid Khan; Harry Craze; Hugo Chegwin | Naughty Boy; Craze & Hoax | |
| "Hollywood" | 2012 | Naughty Boy; (featuring Gabrielle) | Hotel Cabana | Shahid Khan; Emeli Sandé | Naughty Boy | |
| "I'll Be Gone" | —N/a | —N/a | —N/a | Shahid Khan; Eagle Cherry; Benjamin Harrison; Stephen Manderson | —N/a | |
| "I'm Not Sorry" | —N/a | —N/a | —N/a | Shahid Khan; Anthony McLean; Emeli Sandé | —N/a | |
| "Indestructable" | —N/a | —N/a | —N/a | Shahid Khan; Stephen Manderson; Alfred Millar; Philip Plested | —N/a | |
| "Jamma" | —N/a | —N/a | —N/a | Shahid Khan; Priyah Kalidas; Celetia Martin | —N/a | |
| "Just a Boy" | —N/a | —N/a | —N/a | Shahid Khan; Emeli Sandé | —N/a | |
| "Kids that Love to Dance" | 2010 | Professor Green; (featuring Emeli Sandé) | Alive Till I'm Dead | Ed Hayes; Jonny Jenkins; Shahid Khan; Stephen Manderson; Emeli Sandé | Naughty Boy | |
| "La La La" † | 2013 | Naughty Boy; (featuring Sam Smith) | Hotel Cabana | Shahid Khan; Jonny Coffer; Al-Hakam El Kaubaisy; Frobisher Mbabazi; James Murray; Jimmy Napes; Mustafa Omer; Sam Smith | Naughty Boy; Komi | |
| "Let Go" | 2010 | Tinie Tempah; (featuring Emeli Sandé) | Disc-Overy | Ben Harrison; Emile Haynie; Shahid Khan; Patrick Okogwu; Emeli Sandé | Naughty Boy; Emile Haynie; Ben Harrison | |
| "Lie Detector" | —N/a | —N/a | —N/a | Shahid Khan; Mark Asari; Lee Bailey; Talay Riley | —N/a | |
| "Lifetime" | 2012 | Emeli Sandé | Our Version of Events | Shahid Khan; Emeli Sandé | Naughty Boy | |
| "Lifted" † | 2013 | Naughty Boy: (featuring Emeli Sandé) | Hotel Cabana | Shahid Khan; Emeli Sandé; Hugo Chegwin; Harry Craze; Mustafa Omer; James Morry; Jonny Coffer | Naughty Boy | |
| "Lifted" | 2013 | Naughty Boy; (featuring Emeli Sandé & Professor Green) | Hotel Cabana | Shahid Khan; Emeli Sandé; Stephen Manderson; Hugo Chegwin; Harry Craze; Mustafa Omer; James Morry; Jonny Coffer | Naughty Boy | |
| "Lost Ones" | 2013 | Tinie Tempah; (featuring Paloma Faith) | Demonstration | Shahid Khan; Chris Loco; Patrick Okogwu; Paloma Faith | Naughty Boy; Chris Loco | |
| "Mountains"^{[F]} | 2012 | Emeli Sandé | Our Version of Events | Luke Juby; Shahid Khan; James Murray; Mustafa Omer; Emeli Sandé | Mojam Music; Naughty Boy | |
| "Mountains"^{[F]} | 2012 | Leona Lewis | —N/a | Luke Juby; Shahid Khan; James Murray; Mustafa Omer; Emeli Sandé | Mojam Music; Naughty Boy | |
| "Never Be Your Woman"† | 2010 | Naughty Boy; (featuring Wiley & Emeli Sandé) | —N/a | Richard Cowie; Bing Crosby; Shahid Khan; Jyoti Mishra; Irving Wallman; Max Wartell | Naughty Boy | |
| "Never Be Your Woman"; (bonus track) | 2013 | Naughty Boy; (featuring Wiley & Emeli Sandé) | Hotel Cabana | Richard Cowie; Bing Crosby; Shahid Khan; Jyoti Mishra; Irving Wallman; Max Wartell | Naughty Boy | |
| "No One's Here to Sleep" | 2013 | Naughty Boy; (featuring Dan Smith of Bastille) | Hotel Cabana | Shahid Khan; Dan Smith | Naughty Boy | |
| "One Way" | 2013 | Naughty Boy; (featuring Mic Righteous & Maiday) | Hotel Cabana | Shahid Khan; Rocky Takalooo; Rachel Moulden; Luke Juby | Naughty Boy | |
| "Pluto" | 2013 | Naughty Boy; (featuring Emeli Sandé & Wretch 32) | Hotel Cabana | Shahid Khan; Emeli Sandé; Hugo Chegwin; Harry Craze; Luke Juby; Jermaine Scott | Naughty Boy | |
| "Radio"† | 2010 | Alesha Dixon | The Entertainer | Emeli Sandé; Shahid Khan; Benny Scarrs | Naughty Boy; Nigel Butler (vocal prod.); Ray Hodges (vocal prod.) | |
| "Radio" §; (KLAAS Remix) | 2010 | Alesha Dixon; (featuring Wiley) | The Entertainer | Emeli Sandé; Shahid Khan; Beny Scarrs; Richard Cowie | Naughty Boy; Nigel Butler (vocal prod.); Ray Hodges (vocal prod.) | |
| "Repair Kit" | —N/a | —N/a | —N/a | Shahid Khan; Patrick Okogwu | —N/a | |
| "River" | 2012 | Emeli Sandé | Our Version of Events | Shahid Khan; Emeli Sandé | Naughty Boy | |
| "Saddest Vanilla" | 2015 | Jess Glynne; (featuring Emeli Sandé) | I Cry When I Laugh | Jess Glynne; Emeli Sandé; Shahid Khan | Naughty Boy | |
| "See No Evil" | —N/a | —N/a | —N/a | Shahid Khan; Benjamin Harrison; August Rigo | —N/a | |
| "She's a Gangster" | —N/a | —N/a | —N/a | Shahid Khan; Bashy; James; Mus; Zalonsasababu Thompson | —N/a | |
| "Side Effects of You" | 2013 | Fantasia Burrino | Side Effects of You | Claudia Bryant; Ben Harrison; Shahid Khan; Emeli Sandé | Naughty Boy | |
| "So Strong" | 2013 | Naughty Boy; (featuring Chasing Grace) | Hotel Cabana | Shahid Khan; Grace Ackerman; Philip Plested | Naughty Boy | |
| "Solace" | —N/a | A*M*E; (featuring MNEK) | —N/a | Shahid Khan; Uzoechi Emenike; Aminata Kabba | —N/a | |
| "Sorry" | —N/a | —N/a | —N/a | Shahid Khan; Bashy; James; Mus; Zalonsasababu Thompson | —N/a | |
| "Stay Awake" | —N/a | —N/a | —N/a | Shahid Khan; Steve Mostyn; Emeli Sandé | —N/a | |
| "Suitcase" | 2012 | Emeli Sandé | Our Version of Events | Ben Harrison; Shahid Khan; Emeli Sandé | Naughty Boy; Ben Harrison; Mojam Music | |
| "Think About It" | 2013 | Naughty Boy; (featuring Wiz Khalifa & Ella Eyre) | Hotel Cabana | Shahid Khan; Mustafa Omer; James Murray; Andrea Martin; Cameron Jibril Thomasz; Luke Juby | Naughty Boy | |
| "This Will be the Year" | 2011 | Susan Boyle | Someone to Watch Over Me | Emeli Sandé; Josh Kear; Shahid Khan | Steve Mac | |
| "Tiger" | 2012 | Emeli Sandé | Our Version of Events | Shahid Khan; Emeli Sandé | Naughty Boy | |
| "Til the End" | 2010 | Tinchy Stryder; (featuring Amelle) | Third Strike | Shahid Khan; Emeli Sandé; Kwasi Danquah | Naughty Boy | |
| "Top Floor" | 2013 | Naughty Boy: (featuring Ed Sheeran) | Hotel Cabana | Shahid Khan; Ed Sheeran | Naughty Boy | |
| "Trouble" | 2012 | Leona Lewis | Glassheart | Hugo Chegwin; Harry Craze; Shahid Khan; Leona Lewis; Emeli Sandé; Fraser T Smith | Naughty Boy; Fraser T Smith; Chris Loco; Orlando "Jahlil Beats" Tucker | |
| "Trouble" † | 2012 | Leona Lewis (featuring Childish Gambino) | Glassheart | Hugo Chegwin; Harry Craze; Shahid Khan; Leona Lewis; Emeli Sandé; Fraser T Smith | Naughty Boy; Fraser T Smith; Chris Loco; Orlando "Jahlil Beats" Tucker | |
| "Until Then I'll Suffer" | —N/a | —N/a | —N/a | Shahid Khan; Ashley Thomas | —N/a | |
| "Very Little Good" | —N/a | —N/a | —N/a | Shahid Khan; Philip Plested; Emeli Sandé; Unknown Writer | —N/a | |
| "We Can Do Anything" | —N/a | —N/a | —N/a | Shahid Khan; Ashley Thomas | —N/a | |
| "Welcome to Cabana" | 2013 | Naughty Boy; (featuring Emeli Sandé & Tinie Tempah) | Hotel Cabana | Shahid Khan; Patrick Okogwu; Emeli Sandé | Naughty Boy | |
| "When It Hurts" | —N/a | —N/a | Shahid Khan; Andrea Martin; Luke Juby; Amin Sheraz | —N/a | Naughty Boy | |
| "When It Hurts" | 2012 | Leona Lewis | Glassheart | Shahid Khan; Andrea Martin; Luke Juby | Naughty Boy; Fraser T Smith | |
| "Where I Sleep" | 2012 | Emeli Sandé | Our Version of Events | Shahid Khan; Emeli Sandé | Naughty Boy | |
| "Wonder" † | 2012 | Naughty Boy; (featuring Emeli Sandé) | Hotel Cabana and Our Version of Events | Hugo Chegwin; Harry Craze; Shahid Khan; Emeli Sandé | Naughty Boy | |
| "Yesterday's News" | 2010 | Devlin | Bud, Sweat and Beers | James Devlin; Ben Harrison; James Murray; Mustafa Omer; Shahid Khan | Mojam Music; Naughty Boy | |
| "Happen" | 2016 | Emeli Sandé | Long Live the Angels | Emeli Sande; Matthew Holmes; Philip Leigh; Jonny Coffer; Shahid Kahn | Naughty Boy; Mac & Phil | |
| "Right Now" | 2016 | Emeli Sandé | Long Live the Angels | Emeli Sande; Matthew Holmes; Philip Leigh; Shahid Khan | Naughty Boy; Mac & Phil | |
| "Shakes" | 2016 | Emeli Sandé | Long Live the Angels | Emeli Sande; Shahid Khan; Jonny Coffer | Naughty Boy | |
| "I'd Rather Not" | 2016 | Emeli Sandé | Long Live the Angels | Emeli Sande; Shahid Khan; Jonny Coffer; Shakil Ashraf | Naughty Boy; Shakaveli | |
