= George the Poet =

British spoken-word artist and rapper (born 1991)

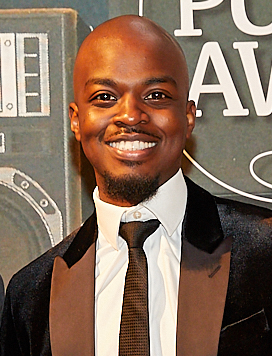
- George the Poet in 2019

Background information
- Born: George Mpanga; 14 January 1991 (age 35); Neasden, London, England
- Genres: Spoken word; hip hop
- Occupations: Poet
- Years active: 2006–present
- Website: iamgeorgethepoet.co.uk
- Awards: 2019 Peabody Award

George Mpanga (born 14 January 1991), better known by his stage name George the Poet, is a British spoken word artist, poet, rapper, and podcast host with an interest in social and political issues. Mpanga came to prominence as a poet, before progressing to spoken word and hip-hop. This led to him being signed by Island Records, culminating in the release of his debut EP The Chicken and the Egg to critical acclaim. However, Mpanga felt constrained by the art form, quit rapping, and left his record label prior to the release of his debut album. He moved on to performing poetry and created a podcast entitled Have You Heard George's Podcast?

In 2018, Mpanga was elected to be a Member of the National Council of Arts for Arts Council England. Have You Heard George's Podcast? won five awards at the 2019 British Podcast Awards, including "Podcast of the Year".

In 2019, Have You Heard George's Podcast? won a Peabody Award, becoming the first podcast outside of the US to win the award.

== Early life ==
Mpanga was born to Ugandan parents on the St Raphael's Estate in Neasden, north-west London. His paternal grandmother is Ugandan politician and former cabinet minister Joyce Mpanga. He began performing rap and grime when he was 15 years old.

== Education ==
Mpanga was educated at Queen Elizabeth's School, Barnet, a selective state grammar school, from 2002 to 2009. He subsequently studied politics, psychology and sociology at King's College, Cambridge (2010–2013), where he decided to adapt his rap output into poetry so as to communicate more effectively with his audience. Mpanga said, "I think rappers are primarily expected to make money for the industry and provide party soundtracks, but obviously there are exceptions and grey areas. The poet's 'role' is usually to provide thoughtful social commentary."

During his studies, Mpanga won a social enterprise competition organised by Barclays and Channel 4 called The Stake, which asked entrants how they would spend £100,000. He used his £16,000 prize to fund The Jubilee Line, a series of secondary school poetry workshops for underprivileged children in London.

== Life and career ==
In May 2012, Mpanga premiered the piece "My City", about his hometown London. Subsequently, BBC Radio 1 selected him as the face of their Hackney Weekend (in June 2012), and Sky Sports F1 commissioned him to write poems for their coverage of the 2012 Formula One season and the 2013 Monaco Grand Prix. In July 2014, the consumer watchdog group Which? released the track "It's Yours", a collaboration between Mpanga and producer Jakwob, as part of a campaign lobbying the UK Government to improve their response to complaints about public services. "My City" was adapted as a music collaboration with dance producers Bodhi, and released as a single in August 2014. In October 2014, Mpanga released the EP The Chicken and the Egg and the single "1,2,1,2" (once again with Bodhi), describing the former release as "about premature parenthood. Through the story of a rocky relationship, it outlines the cycle of fatherlessness in seven tracks." Vice magazine wrote that the EP "showcases perhaps the tightest lyricism of the year to date".

In November 2014, it was announced that Mpanga had been shortlisted for the Critics' Choice category at the 2015 BRIT Awards. He came fifth in the BBC Sound of 2015 poll. As of late 2014, Mpanga was writing a debut album and working on theatre and film projects. He released the single "Cat D" in February 2015. His first collection of poetry in book form, Search Party, was published by Virgin Books in 2015.

In March 2018, it was announced that Mpanga had been elected as a member of the national council of Arts Council England. Shortly afterwards, in June 2018, it came to media attention that Mpanga had been stopped and searched by police in an incident that was video-recorded. Mpanga opened the BBC coverage of the royal wedding, between Prince Harry and Megan Markle, by reading a love poem. He has also appeared twice on the television programme Question Time. In 2019, Mpanga turned down an offer to become an MBE, citing the British Empire's treatment of his ancestral homeland, Uganda.

As of July 2021, Mpanga was studying for a PhD in economics at University College London, focusing on the potential for black music to catalyse social power and economic progress.

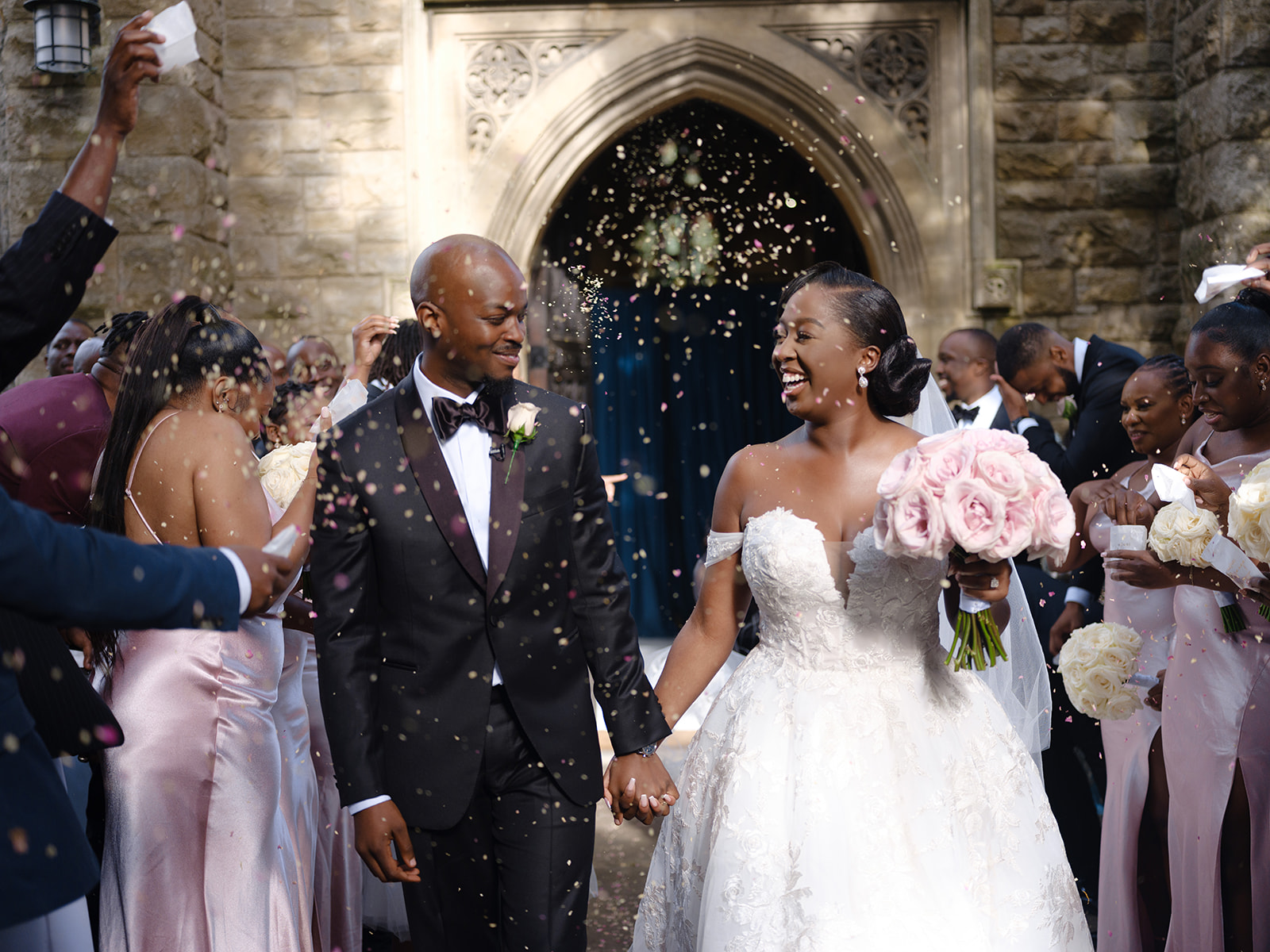
Wedding of George Mpanga and Sandra Makumbi, 28 August 2021

On 28 August 2021, Mpanga married Sandra Diana Makumbi in a ceremony at St Nicolas Church in Taplow, Buckinghamshire, followed by wedding celebrations at the nearby Hedsor House estate.

== Artistry ==
Mpanga's influences include rappers Nas, Dizzee Rascal, and Tupac Shakur, and poets including Maya Angelou, Black Ice, and George Watsky.

== Discography ==
=== Extended plays ===
- The Chicken and the Egg (2014)
- Do What Comes Naturally (2025)

=== Singles ===
- "It's Yours" (2014)
- "My City" (2014)
- "1,2,1,2" (2014)
- "Cat D" (2015)
- "Wotless" (2015)
- "Search Party" (2015)
- "Search Party 2" (2015)
- "What Do You Reckon?" (2016)
- "Wake Up" (2016)
- "Follow the Leader" (2018)
- "Make a Change" (2021)
- "The Natural World" (2025)

=== Guest appearances and collaborations ===
- "Young Kingz Part 1" (2013). Collaboration with Krept & Konan
- "The Lucky Strike EP" (2013). Collaboration with Mikill Pane
- "Act I" (2013). Collaboration with Naughty Boy
- "Act II" (2013). Collaboration with Naughty Boy
- "Epilogue" (2013). Collaboration with Naughty Boy
- "In The Quiet" (2014). Collaboration with Nick Brewer and Max Marshall
- "My City" (2014). Collaboration with Bodhi
- "Spoken Word" (2016). Collaboration with Chase & Status
- "Royalty" (2018). Collaboration with Dun D and Tiggs Da Author
- "If I Gotta Go" (2021). Collaboration with Skrapz
- "Motivational Speech" (2024). Collaboration with Skrapz and Terrell the Artist

== Podcast discography ==
=== Have You Heard George's Podcast Chapter One (2018) ===
- Episode 1 – Listen Closer
- Episode 2 – Popcorn
- Episode 3 – A Grenfell Story
- Episode 3.5 – Grenfell II
- Episode 4 – It's On Us
- Episode 5 – Press Play
- Episode 6 – The Journey Pt I
- Episode 7 – The Journey Pt II
- Episode 8 – Sanyu's World

=== Have You Heard George's Podcast Chapter Two (2019) ===
- Episode 9 – Sabrina's Boy
- Episode 10 – A Bedtime Story
- Episode 11 – Writer's Block
- Episode 12 – A Night to REMember
- Episode 13 – A North West Story
- Episode 14 – A Hard Taskmaster
- Episode 15 – Who Am I?
- Episode 16 – Loose Ends
- Episode 17 – The Bag
- Episode 18 – Concurrent Affairs

== Awards and nominations ==
Year	Organisation	Award	Result
2015	BRIT Awards	Critics' Choice	Nominated
2015	MTV	Brand New for 2015	Nominated
2015	BBC	Sound of 2015	Fifth
2019	British Podcast Awards	Audioboom Podcast of the Year	Won
2019	British Podcast Awards	Best Arts & Culture	Won
2019	British Podcast Awards	Best Fiction	Won
2019	British Podcast Awards	Best New Podcast	Won
2019	British Podcast Awards	Smartest Podcast	Won
2019	Lovie Awards	Artist of the Year	Won
2020	Peabody Awards	Podcast/Radio Award	Won
2020	Webby Awards	Best Podcast Series	Nominated
2020	Visionary Arts	Influencer of the Year	Won
2020	Broadcasting Press Guild	Podcast of the Year	Won
2020	NME	Best Podcast	Won
2020	Audio Production Awards	Best Presenter – Speech	Won
2021	Audio and Radio Industry Awards	Best Speech Presenter	Won
2021	Audio and Radio Industry Awards	Best Factual Single Programme	Pending
2021	Audio and Radio Industry Awards	Best Fictional Storytelling	Pending
2021	Audio and Radio Industry Awards	The Creative Innovation Award	Pending
