= Home (Naughty Boy song) =

Single by Naughty Boy featuring RØMANS

from the album Hotel Cabana
- Released: 27 July 2014
- Genre: Soul; R&B; pop
- Length: 3:26
- Label: Naughty Boy; Virgin EMI
- Songwriters: Naughty Boy; Sam Romans; Shakil Ashraf
- Producer: Naughty Boy

Naughty Boy singles chronology
| "Think About It" (2013) | "Home" (2014) | "Runnin' (Lose It All)" (2015) |

RØMANS singles chronology
| "Home" (2014) | "Uh Huh" (2015) |

Home is a 2014 song by Naughty Boy from his album Hotel Cabana. It features RØMANS, who is signed to Roc Nation. The song was released as a digital download on 27 July 2014. The song has peaked at number 45 on the UK Singles Chart.

== Music video ==
A music video was created for the song which features life in the eyes of a dog.

== Critical reception ==
4Music said "reassuring and feelgood, this soulful tune ... soothes our blues away".

== Track listing ==
Digital download – single
| No. | Title | Length |
|---|---|---|
| 1. | "Home" (featuring Sam Romans) | 3:26 |

Digital download – EP
| No. | Title | Length |
|---|---|---|
| 1. | "Home" (Friend Within Remix) | 6:20 |
| 2. | "Home" (Kat Krazy Remix) | 3:41 |
| 3. | "Home" (Krept and Konan Remix) | 3:26 |
| 4. | "Home" (Instrumental) | 5:19 |

Fedde Le Grand Remix
| No. | Title | Length |
|---|---|---|
| 1. | "Home" (Fedde Le Grand Remix) | 6:20 |

== Charts ==
| Chart (2014) | Peak position |
|---|---|
| Scotland Singles (OCC) | 34 |
| UK Singles (OCC) | 45 |
| US Dance Club Songs (Billboard) | 28 |

== Release history ==
| Country | Date | Format | Label |
|---|---|---|---|
| United Kingdom | 27 July 2014 | Digital download | Naughty Boy; Virgin EMI |
| United States | 21 October 2014 | Contemporary hit radio | Def Jam |
