= Runnin' (Lose It All) =

2015 single by Naughty Boy

Single by Naughty Boy featuring Beyoncé and Arrow Benjamin
- Released: 17 September 2015
- Recorded: 2015
- Genre: R&B; breakbeat; soul; garage
- Length: 3:33
- Label: Naughty Boy; Virgin EMI
- Songwriters: Jonny Coffer; Naughty Boy; Beyoncé; Arrow Benjamin; Carla Marie Williams
- Producers: Naughty Boy; Jonny Coffer; Carla Marie Williams

Naughty Boy singles chronology
"Home" (2014)	"Runnin' (Lose It All)" (2015)	"Should've Been Me" (2016)

Beyoncé singles chronology
"Crazy in Love (Remix)" (2015)	"Runnin' (Lose It All)" (2015)	"Formation" (2016)

Arrow Benjamin singles chronology
"Runnin' (Lose It All)" (2015)	"Love and Hate" (2015)

"Runnin' (Lose It All)" is a song by British record producer Naughty Boy, featuring American singer Beyoncé and British singer Arrow Benjamin. It was released online on 17 September 2015 through Virgin EMI Records. Upon its release, the song received positive reviews from music critics, mostly praising the song's arrangements and Beyoncé's vocals.

The accompanying music video was directed by Charlie Robins received critical acclaim for directing and cinematography, being shortlisted for the Brit Award for British Video of the Year and winning at the Cannes Lions International Festival of Creativity.

Commercially, the track has reached number one in France and Scotland, the top 10 in the Czech Republic, New Zealand, Poland, Spain, and the United Kingdom, becoming Naughty Boy's fifth, Beyoncé's 18th, and Arrow Benjamin's first top ten song in the UK.

== Background ==
On 16 September 2015, Naughty Boy announced that he would release a song titled "Runnin' (Lose It All)" featuring Beyoncé and Arrow Benjamin. On the same date he shared the artwork for the single, its lyrics, a 15-second sound snippet along with a video through his Instagram account and began a countdown until its online release. The video consisted of two humans floating alone, submerged underwater. The following day, on 17 September 2015, "Runnin'" premiered online. It was available for digital download on the iTunes Store on 18 September 2015. According to Digital Spy, a version of the song lacking Beyoncé's vocals leaked online in August 2015.

== Composition ==
"Runnin' (Lose It All)" is a power ballad featuring elements of drum and bass. It was noted by Elle Hunt of The Guardian to be established in the genre of British dance music. The song's composition consists of melancholy piano keys. It opens with Beyoncé singing the first verse over a piano track with lyrics such as "Nothing else matters now; you're not here. So where are you? I've been calling you, [I'm] missing you". Following the hook, the song's tempo increases and "Runnin'" continues with a garage break afterwards. During the chorus, Beyoncé sings about how she will stop running from herself as she repeats the lines "Ain't running from myself no more". The second verse is sung by Arrow Benjamin and the last chorus is sung as a duet between both singers. Eric Renner Brown from Entertainment Weekly further found "typically soulful Beyoncé lyrics". Elle Hunt of The Guardian compared the song with Beyoncé's own "Halo" and "Haunted" as well as Naughty Boy's previous collaborations with singer Emeli Sandé.

== Critical reception ==
Elle Hunt from The Guardian praised "Runnin'" as "a shimmery club classic, the kind we've seen plenty of in the past 20 years". CBS News writer Andrea Park dubbed Beyoncé's vocals as "unmistakeable". Exclaim!'s Alex Hudson also described the singer's voice as "powerful". Laura Bradley of Slate magazine noted that Beyoncé opened the song with "the kind of force few other singers can muster". She further compared it with the singer's own "XO", due to their reminiscent "triumphant, love-conquers-all spirit". Nick Levine of NME described the song as "pleasant rather than transcendent", and that it "begins as a minimal piano ballad before Naughty Boy introduces some clattering UK garage beats and it becomes, well, not a banger exactly, but definitely something you could tap your foot to under your desk."

== Commercial performance ==
"Runnin' (Lose It All)" peaked at number four on the UK Singles Chart, becoming Naughty Boy's fifth, Beyoncé's 18th, and Arrow Benjamin's first top ten song in the UK. The song also reached number one on the Scottish Singles Chart and the French Singles Chart. It was certified double platinum by the British Phonographic Industry (BPI) for sales of 1,200,000 copies. It also reached number one the UK airplay chart. In the United States, the single peaked at number 90 on the Billboard Hot 100 chart issue dated 10 October 2015.

== Music video ==
The music video for the song was directed by Charlie Robins. It was released on Naughty Boy's official Vevo account on 17 September 2015. It features freedivers Guillaume Néry and Alice Modolo as a man and a woman underwater running towards each other, trying to reunite. The video is inspired by the short film Ocean Gravity. Discussing the conception of the video, Robins said: "In order to achieve the effect we were after we had to film in the middle of a fast, deep and quite dangerous current through a lagoon, this gave us the forward momentum you see in the film. They didn’t use tanks for air so everything you see in the film was done holding their breath, sometimes up to six minutes at a time. I still can’t quite believe how they do it. No CGI was used. Quite something." The video was filmed at Rangiroa, an atoll northeast of Tahiti in French Polynesia. The video was choreographed by Julie Gaultier, who co-directed Ocean Gravity with Néry, and was shot over four days.

A Time magazine writer described the clip as "a very serene underwater adventure". Alex Hudson from Exclaim! wrote that the visuals depicted a "dramatic underwater romance". Laura Bradley of Slate interpreted the video as "a surreal take on a classic premise — two people search for one another across great distances, and finally come together in an embrace". "Runnin' (Lose It All)" won a Bronze Lion award in the Excellence In Music Video category at the Cannes Lions International Festival of Creativity, on 24 June 2016, and won the Bronze Award for Best Music Promo Film at the Creative Circle Awards. The song was also shortlisted for the Brit Award for British Video of the Year and was nominated at the Los Premios 40 Principales.

== Usage in media ==
The song is featured in the trailer to the 2017 film Everything, Everything. In August 2017, the song was also featured in the background for Chanel's "Gabrielle" television campaigns.

== Charts ==
=== Weekly charts ===
Weekly chart performance
Chart (2015–17)	Peak position
Australia (ARIA)	22
Austria (Ö3 Austria Top 40)	12
Belgium (Ultratop 50 Flanders)	16
Belgium (Ultratop 50 Wallonia)	11
Canada Hot 100 (Billboard)	61
CIS Airplay (TopHit)	112
Czech Republic Airplay (ČNS IFPI)	5
Czech Republic Singles Digital (ČNS IFPI)	61
Euro Digital Song Sales (Billboard)	4
Finland Airplay (Radiosoittolista)	27
France (SNEP)	18
Germany (GfK)	85
Hungary (Editors' Choice Top 40)	34
Hungary (Single Top 40)	17
Ireland (IRMA)	12
Italy (FIMI)	59
Mexico (Billboard Mexican Airplay)	50
Netherlands (Dutch Top 40)	14
Netherlands (Single Top 100)	19
New Zealand (Recorded Music NZ)	10
Poland Airplay (ZPAV)	8
Portugal (AFP)	17
Romania Airplay (Media Forest)	3
Scottish Singles Sales (Official Charts)	1
Slovakia Airplay (ČNS IFPI)	21
Slovakia Singles Digital (ČNS IFPI)	37
Slovenia (SloTop50)	23
Spain (Promusicae)	51
Sweden (Sverigetopplistan)	70
Switzerland (Schweizer Hitparade)	23
UK Singles (Official Charts)	4
US Billboard Hot 100	90
US Rhythmic Airplay (Billboard)	34

=== Year-end charts ===
Annual chart rankings
Chart (2015)	Position
Belgium (Ultratop Flanders Urban)	28
France (SNEP)	167
Netherlands (Dutch Top 40)	66
Netherlands (NPO 3FM)	81
UK Singles (OCC)	59

Chart (2016)	Position
Belgium (Ultratop Flanders Urban)	57

== Certifications ==
Certifications and sales
Region	Certification	Certified units/sales
Australia (ARIA)	Gold	35,000^{‡}
Brazil (Pro-Música Brasil)	2× Platinum	120,000^{‡}
Denmark (IFPI Danmark)	Gold	45,000^{‡}
Italy (FIMI)	Gold	25,000^{‡}
New Zealand (RMNZ)	2× Platinum	60,000^{‡}
Poland (ZPAV)	2× Platinum	40,000^{‡}
Spain (Promusicae)	Gold	30,000^{‡}
United Kingdom (BPI)	2× Platinum	1,200,000^{‡}
United States	—	119,875
^{‡} Sales+streaming figures based on certification alone.

== Release history ==
Radio dates
Country	Date	Format	Label
United States	6 October 2015	Contemporary hit radio	Capitol
