= Lifted (Naughty Boy song) =

Single by Naughty Boy featuring Emeli Sandé

from the album Hotel Cabana
- Released: 18 August 2013
- Studio: Cabana @ Ealing (London, UK)
- Genre: R&B; soul; breakbeat
- Length: 3:15; 4:16 (remix, also feat. Professor Green)
- Label: Naughty Boy; Virgin EMI
- Songwriter(s): Shahid Khan; Emeli Sandé; Hugo Chegwin; Harry Craze; Mustafa Omer; James Murray
- Producer(s): Naughty Boy

Naughty Boy singles chronology
"La La La" (2013)	"Lifted" (2013)	"Think About It" (2013)

Emeli Sandé singles chronology
"Bitch, Don't Kill My Vibe" (2013)	"Lifted" (2013)	"Free" (2013)

"Lifted" is a single released by British record producer Naughty Boy, featuring vocals from Scottish singer and songwriter Emeli Sandé. It was released on 18 August 2013 as the third single from Naughty Boy's debut album, Hotel Cabana (2013). The full track was uploaded to Naughty Boy's SoundCloud account on 4 July 2013. An alternate version of the song, featuring a rap from Professor Green is included on the album as well as the original song.

== Music video ==
A music video to accompany the release of "Lifted" was first released onto YouTube on 29 July 2013 at a total length of three minutes and twenty-six seconds. The video shows two guys stumble upon a seemingly deserted hotel, which plays host to a number of lone figures dancing. The video was shot in the Shawangunk Mountains in the Hudson Valley Region of New York, and features interior scenes of the historic Hudson Valley Resort & Spa. Emeli Sandé and Naughty Boy have a very brief cameo in the video, with the pair appearing in framed pictures at the mysterious hotel.

== Critical reception ==
Robert Copsey of Digital Spy gave the song a positive review stating:

"Imagine if Naughty Boy and Emeli Sandé decided to form as an official, full-time duo? While neither of their names combine to form a decent portmanteau (Naughté was the best we could come up with), the result would be an endless stream of gospel-flecked dance songs much like their recent efforts 'Daddy' and 'Wonder'. On second thoughts, scratch that idea. Because while we thoroughly enjoy the blending of Shahid Khan's orchestral, D&B-light beats and her rich hymnal tones on the stadium-filling chorus, 'Lifted' proves that the formula has a very limited shelf life. And judging by her dominance on his forthcoming Hotel Cabana album, they're going to milk it for all it's worth."

== Track listing ==
Digital single

1. "Lifted" - 3:15

Digital Remixes EP

1. "Lifted" (Kat Krazy Remix) - 3:00
2. "Lifted" (Mojam Remix) - 5:57
3. "Lifted" (Loadstar Remix) - 4:34
4. "Lifted" (Raf Riley Remix) - 4:27

== Charts ==
=== Weekly charts ===
Weekly chart performance for "Lifed"
Chart (2013)	Peak position
Belgium (Ultratip Bubbling Under Flanders)	9
Belgium (Ultratop Flanders Urban)	16
Czech Republic (Rádio – Top 100)	19
Germany (GfK)	55
Ireland (IRMA)	21
Netherlands (Single Top 100)	63
Netherlands (Mega Dance Top 30)	12
Poland (Polish Airplay Top 100)	5
Romania (Airplay 100)	73
Scotland (OCC)	8
Slovakia (Rádio Top 100)	46
Switzerland (Schweizer Hitparade) "Lifted" (Naughty Boy feat. Emeli Sandé & Professor Green)	61
UK Dance (OCC)	4
UK Singles (OCC)	8

=== Year-end charts ===
Chart (2013)	Peak position
Netherlands (Dutch Top 40)	161

== Release history ==
Country	Release date	Format	Label
United Kingdom	19 August 2013	Digital download; streaming	Naughty Boy Records; Virgin EMI
