= La La La (Naughty Boy song) =

Single by Naughty Boy featuring Sam Smith

from the album Hotel Cabana
- Released: 18 May 2013
- Recorded: 2012
- Studio: Cabana Studios (Ealing Studios); Ealing, London
- Genre: UK garage; R&B; dance-pop
- Length: 3:42
- Label: Naughty Boy; Virgin EMI
- Songwriters: Shahid Khan; Al-Hakam El-Kaubaisy; Frobisher Mbabazi; Sam Smith; James Napier; James Murray; Mustafa Omer; Jonny Coffer
- Producers: Naughty Boy; Komi; Mojam

Naughty Boy singles chronology
"Wonder" (2012)	"La La La" (2013)	"Lifted" (2013)

Sam Smith singles chronology
"Lay Me Down" (2013)	"La La La" (2013)	"When It's Alright" (2013)

Music video
- "La La La" on YouTube

"La La La" is a song released by the English record producer Naughty Boy, featuring vocals from Sam Smith. It was released on 18 May 2013 as the second single from Naughty Boy's debut studio album Hotel Cabana (2013) and it appears on the deluxe edition of Smith's debut studio album In the Lonely Hour (2014). The track reached number one on the music charts in 26 countries, including Italy, the Czech Republic, Russia and the United Kingdom. Upon its release, it was confirmed by the Official Charts as the fastest-selling single of 2013 in the UK. By the end of 2013, the song was the sixth fastest-selling single of the year in the UK, selling 145,000 copies in the first week.

== Production and composition ==
According to Naughty Boy, "La La La" was conceived from experiences similar to the song "Don't Speak" by No Doubt, which "came from something [he] felt". He states that, "It was just before everything popped up and she was somebody I neglected while I was trying to find me. When I found me, she found it best to neglect me. It's cool... Covering my ears like a kid and saying, 'La. La. La.' It's the man-kid in me."

"La La La" was written by Khan, Jonny Coffer, Al-Hakam El Kaubaisy, Frobisher Mbabazi, James Murray, Jimmy Napes, Mustafa Omer, and Sam Smith. Although Naughty Boy originally intended to write the song with Emeli Sandé, she was on tour at the time, and he wrote it with Sam Smith instead. Naughty Boy said "It just had to be Sam because where it went from there is perfect". Naughty Boy and Komi produced the track, with co-production handled by Mojam. The song was produced using Logic Pro, FL Studio 11 and Reason. It was recorded and mixed at Cabana Studios (Ealing Studios) in Ealing, West London, and mastered by Stuart Hawkes at Metropolis Mastering Studios in London, UK. The song was finished in three hours, and was the last done for Hotel Cabana.

"La La La" plays for three minutes and 42 seconds. The piece is performed in F♯ minor, with the chord progression of F♯m—C♯m—Dmaj7 followed for most of the song, and Sam Smith's vocals range two octaves, from C♯_{3} to C♯_{5}. The song performs in common time at a tempo of 126 beats per minute. "The track has tones of liquid drum and bass and old-school garage, and a hook layered with a Hindi-Bollywood sample".

== Release ==
"La La La" premiered on BBC Radio 1Xtra in May 2013. Smith and Naughty Boy performed "La La La" at the 2013 Jingle Bell Ball held by Global Radio.

The track's producer and co-writer Komi also released a remix ("La La La" – Komi and JL remix).

== Music video ==
A music video to accompany the release of "La La La" was first released on YouTube on 18 April 2013 at a total length of four minutes and three seconds. The video is directed by Ian Pons Jewell (who studied at the University College for the Creative Arts, now the University for the Creative Arts) and shot in four days in La Paz, Salar de Uyuni and Potosí (Cerro Rico), Bolivia. Ian Pons Jewell was commissioned by Virgin EMI to create the concept for the video, which focuses on a child's magical journey. Jewell said that others compared the video to the Wizard of Oz and a local legend of the demon El Tío and that both legends influenced the concept of the video. As of January 2025, the video has received over 1.3 billion views.

=== Synopsis of the video ===
The video starts with the opening of a door marked with the number 1111, a number related to a sign of change. In the music video, a young boy is being verbally abused by a man who is presumably his father. Looking out of his apartment window, he sees an unusually dressed man and his dog standing on the pavement outside. This man could be the representation of the "Ekeko", a South American indigenous figure representative of good luck and abundance. The boy then puts his fingers in his ears and begins singing 'La la la' in response to his father's outburst. Running out of the apartment, the boy joins the mysterious figure outside and pets his dog. Seeing the boy outside, the father picks up an egg from a bird's nest on the window sill and throws it down at the boy.

The boy and dog run away and the scene cuts from evening to daytime. The boy is walking the dog along a city street, in what is inferred to be La Paz, Bolivia, and he goes into a storefront and downstairs. In the basement of the building, he finds a gym and a scared-looking man who is covered in dust; this man looks like a disgraced "Ekeko". The man holds a stereo that provides music for a group of women doing aerobics with one woman who is a leader and abuses both the man and the others since their mascara is running down their cheeks from crying. The boy encourages the man to leave, but he appears reluctant. The boy then mimes the act of putting his fingers in his ears and singing 'La la la', and the man responds by turning off the volume on the stereo. The leader begins yelling at the man, and he puts his fingers in his ears and sings 'La la la' in response to her tirade. The dusty man, boy, and dog leave the gymnasium and are followed by the woman who yells after them as they leave.

The pair then come across an ice cream vendor on the street; a popular figure easy to find on the streets of some South American cities. The boy gives him some coins, and he takes out what appears to be a human heart from a collection in his cart. He holds the heart in the air, the boy looks at him and then slips it inside the jacket pocket of the dusty man. Echoing the Tin Man in The Wizard of Oz, the man now has a heart. The boy then looks onto the road and sees a traffic policeman dressed in an unusually colored police uniform with an elephant-like mask covering his face. His uniform, as well as his exaggerated nose and ears, are made of herringbone tweed. He looks like Kusillo – the spirit of festivity. The traffic policeman is dancing as he directs traffic, but the cars and pedestrians seem to ignore him. The boy once again mimes plugging his ears to the policeman, who then performs the gestures himself. This figure is reminiscent of artists and clowns who often perform on the streets in South American cities for money. The three leave together with the dog, and the scene cuts to their journey into a mountainous region outside of the city. They walk along disused railway tracks and pass a discarded, unplugged television that still shows images on the screen. Their journey takes them across long plains of salt flats, with the traffic policeman carrying the sleeping boy and the dusty man walking the dog.

The scene cuts to nightfall where they have set up a campfire. The boy sleeps in the arms of the traffic policeman while the dusty man holds and pats the dog. The scene cuts to the next day, where they walk up a hillside towards an abandoned mine. Leaving the dog tied at the entrance, they enter the mine. They discover El Tío sitting immobile at the end of a tunnel. At the sight of the figure, the boy begins crying and is hugged and comforted by both men. The men then leave, and the boy remains kneeling before the figure, singing "la la la" with his fingers in his ears, drowning out the demon's spells so that he can no longer harm anyone. The video ends with the two men and the dog walking away from the mine.

== Critical reception ==
Lewis Corner of Digital Spy gave the song a positive review, stating:

As the Wizard of Oz reimagining in the accompanying music video suggests, Naughty Boy is at his best when presenting tales of heartbreak with an otherworldly streak. "Yes our love is running out of time/ I won't count the hours, rather be a coward/ When our words collide," newcomer Sam Smith confesses to [their] beau over rattling beats and bewitching synths. It results in a soulful, ear-snagging masterpiece that will go down.

=== Accolades ===
It won in both the "Best Song" and "Best Video" categories at the 2013 MOBO Awards. The song was nominated for a 2014 BRIT Award for Best British Single.

== Commercial performance ==
"La La La" debuted at number one becoming both Naughty Boy and Sam Smith's first UK number one. It was also declared to be the fifth biggest-selling song of 2013 in the United Kingdom. Its video was the eighth most popular YouTube video of 2013, and the United Kingdom's top trending video of the year. By September 2017, it had sold 1.07 million copies in the UK. In the United States, it reached number nine on the Billboard Pop Digital Songs chart.

== Track listing ==
Digital download
No.	Title	Length
1.	"La La La"	3:40
2.	"La La La" (Komi and JL Remix)	3:40
3.	"La La La" (Kaos Remix)	3:54
4.	"La La La" (Pále Remix)	5:34
5.	"La La La" (DEVolution Remix)	5:47
6.	"La La La" (My Nu Leng Remix)	5:00

US digital download
No.	Title	Length
1.	"La La La"	3:41

2025 digital download (Edits)
No.	Title	Length
1.	"La La La"	3:41
2.	"La La La" (Sped Up Version)	3:17
3.	"La La La" (Slowed Down Version)	4:45
4.	"La La La" (Acapella Version)	3:22
5.	"La La La" (Instrumental Version)	3:40

== Credits ==
Recording

- Recorded and mixed at Cabana Studios (Ealing Studios) in Ealing; West London, UK.
- Mastered at Metropolis Mastering in London, UK.

Personnel

- Jonny Coffer – strings
- Al-Hakam "Komi" El-Kaubaisy – producer, instruments, programming
- Shahid "Naughty Boy" Khan – producer, recording engineer, instruments, programming
- Wez Clarke – mix engineer
- Sam Smith – vocals

== Charts ==
=== Weekly charts ===
2013–2015 weekly chart performance for "La La La"
Chart (2013–2015)	Peak position
Australia (ARIA)	5
Austria (Ö3 Austria Top 40)	3
Belgium (Ultratop 50 Flanders)	3
Belgium Dance (Ultratop Flanders)	3
Belgium Urban (Ultratop Flanders)	1
Belgium (Ultratop 50 Wallonia)	5
Belgium Dance (Ultratop Wallonia)	2
Canada Hot 100 (Billboard)	43
Canada CHR/Top 40 (Billboard)	27
Canada Hot AC (Billboard)	46
CIS Airplay (TopHit)	1
Croatia International Airplay (Top lista)	1
Czech Republic Airplay (ČNS IFPI)	1
Denmark (Tracklisten)	2
Euro Digital Songs (Billboard)	2
Finland (Suomen virallinen lista)	2
France (SNEP)	6
Germany (GfK)	2
Greece Digital (Billboard)	5
Greece International (IFPI)	1
Hungary (Single Top 40)	20
Hungary (Dance Top 40)	6
Hungary (Rádiós Top 40)	2
Hungary (Stream Top 40)	6
Ireland (IRMA)	3
Israel International Airplay (Media Forest)	5
Italy (FIMI)	1
Lebanon (Lebanese Top 20)	1
Luxembourg Digital (Billboard)	3
Mexico Ingles Airplay (Billboard)	10
Netherlands (Dutch Top 40)	4
Netherlands (Single Top 100)	4
New Zealand (Recorded Music NZ)	5
Norway (VG-lista)	2
Poland Airplay (ZPAV)	2
Poland Dance (ZPAV)	9
Portugal Digital (Billboard)	2
Romania (Airplay 100)	1
Romania TV Airplay (Media Forest)	1
Russia Airplay (TopHit)	1
Scottish Singles Sales (Official Charts)	3
Slovakia Airplay (ČNS IFPI)	2
Slovenia (SloTop50)	6
Spain (Promusicae)	4
Sweden (Sverigetopplistan)	13
Switzerland (Schweizer Hitparade)	2
Russia Airplay (TopHit)	1
UK Singles (Official Charts)	1
UK Asian (Official Charts Company)	1
UK Dance (Official Charts)	1
UK Urban (Official Charts Company)	1
US Billboard Hot 100	19
US Adult Pop Airplay (Billboard)	37
US Dance Club Songs (Billboard)	18
US Dance Airplay (Billboard)	18
US Pop Airplay (Billboard)	10
US Rhythmic Airplay (Billboard)	37
Venezuela Pop Rock Airplay (Record Report)	14

2021–2025 weekly chart performance for "La La La"
Chart (2023–2025)	Peak position
Austria (Ö3 Austria Top 40)	11
Belarus Airplay (TopHit)	172
CIS Airplay (TopHit)	185
Czech Republic Singles Digital (ČNS IFPI)	34
Estonia Airplay (TopHit)	149
Global 200 (Billboard)	59
Germany (GfK)	21
Greece International (IFPI)	76
Kazakhstan Airplay (TopHit)	124
Latvia Streaming (LaIPA)	19
Lithuania (AGATA)	36
Moldova Airplay (TopHit)	163
Philippines (Philippines Hot 100)	18
Poland (Polish Streaming Top 100)	69
Romania Airplay (TopHit)	92
Slovakia Singles Digital (ČNS IFPI)	1
Ukraine Airplay (TopHit)	97
UK Singles (Official Charts)	32

=== Year-end charts ===
2013 year-end chart performance for "La La La"
Chart (2013)	Position
Australia (ARIA)	40
Austria (Ö3 Austria Top 40)	27
Belgium (Ultratop 50 Flanders)	28
Belgium Dance (Ultratop Flanders)	19
Belgium Urban (Ultratop Flanders)	10
Belgium (Ultratop 50 Wallonia)	43
Belgium Dance (Ultratop Wallonia)	10
Denmark (Tracklisten)	17
Germany (Official German Charts)	10
Hungary (Dance Top 40)	24
Hungary (Rádiós Top 40)	16
Israel (Media Forest)	21
Italy (FIMI)	22
Netherlands (Dutch Top 40)	21
Netherlands (Single Top 100)	18
New Zealand (Recorded Music NZ)	33
Norway Summer Period (VG-lista)	6
Russia Airplay (TopHit)	9
Slovenia (SloTop50)	13
Spain (PROMUSICAE)	34
Spain (PROMUSICAE Streaming)	20
Sweden (Sverigetopplistan)	55
Switzerland (Schweizer Hitparade)	19
Ukraine Airplay (TopHit)	17
UK Singles (Official Charts Company)	5

2014 year-end chart performance for "La La La"
Chart (2014)	Position
Hungary (Dance Top 40)	70
Russia Airplay (TopHit)	87
Ukraine Airplay (TopHit)	134
US Billboard Hot 100	82
US Mainstream Top 40 (Billboard)	49

== Certifications and sales ==
Certifications and sales for "La La La"
Region	Certification	Certified units/sales
Australia (ARIA)	2× Platinum	140,000^{^}
Austria (IFPI Austria)	Platinum	30,000^{*}
Belgium (BRMA)	Gold	15,000^{*}
Brazil (Pro-Música Brasil)	2× Platinum	120,000^{‡}
Canada (Music Canada)	Gold	40,000^{*}
Denmark (IFPI Danmark)	Gold	15,000^{^}
Germany (BVMI)	3× Gold	450,000^{‡}
Italy (FIMI)	2× Platinum	60,000^{‡}
New Zealand (RMNZ)	4× Platinum	120,000^{‡}
Portugal (AFP)	Platinum	10,000^{‡}
Spain (Promusicae)	Platinum	60,000^{‡}
Sweden (GLF)	3× Platinum	120,000^{‡}
Switzerland (IFPI Switzerland)	Platinum	30,000^{^}
United Kingdom (BPI)	3× Platinum	1,800,000^{‡}
United States (RIAA)	2× Platinum	2,000,000^{‡}
Streaming
Denmark (IFPI Danmark)	4× Platinum	7,200,000^{†}
Greece (IFPI Greece)	Gold	1,000,000^{†}
Spain (Promusicae)	Gold	4,000,000^{†}
^{*} Sales figures based on certification alone.^{^} Shipments figures based on certification alone.^{‡} Sales+streaming figures based on certification alone.^{†} Streaming-only figures based on certification alone.

== Release history ==
Release dates for "La La La"
Country	Release date	Format	Label
Worldwide	18 May 2013	Digital download; streaming	Naughty Boy; Virgin EMI
Canada	15 October 2013	Digital download; streaming	Naughty Boy; Virgin EMI
United States	10 December 2013	Digital download; streaming	Capitol
United States	14 January 2014	Contemporary hit radio	Capitol

== See also ==
- List of Airplay 100 number ones of the 2010s
