= Hotel Cabana =

Studio album by Naughty Boy
- Released: 23 August 2013
- Recorded: 2011–2013
- Studios: Cabana @ Ealing Studios, Metropolis Studios (London, UK); Genesis Sound Studios (Surrey, UK)
- Genres: R&B; pop
- Length: 36:39
- Labels: Naughty Boy; Virgin EMI
- Producers: Craze & Hoax; Komi; Mojam; Naughty Boy; Wez Clarke

Singles from Hotel Cabana
- 1. "Wonder" Released: 21 October 2012; 2. "La La La" Released: 18 May 2013; 3. "Lifted" Released: 19 August 2013; 4. "Think About It" Released: 17 November 2013; 5. "Home" Released: 20 July 2014

Hotel Cabana is the debut studio album by the British record producer Shahid "Naughty Boy" Khan, released on 23 August 2013 through Naughty Boy Recordings and Virgin EMI. Khan set up his Naughty Boy Productions record and production company. He would find his break by producing Chipmunk's 2009 top-ten single "Diamond Rings", featuring a then unknown Emeli Sandé. Naughty Boy released his own debut single as a signed artist in 2010. "Never Be Your Woman" samples White Town's 1997 number-one single "Your Woman" and featured British grime artist Wiley and Sandé on the chorus; it reached the top ten in the UK and is included as a bonus track on Hotel Cabana.

The collaboration marked the start of a partnership between Naughty Boy and Sandé which is seen throughout Hotel Cabana and Sandé's debut set, Our Version of Events (2012). Hotel Cabana is R&B, soul, garage, pop and hip hop music productions record, with influences from orchestral and Bollywood music. Naughty Boy describes it as an "audio-visual experience" and a concept album based on a luxury hotel where musicians come to perform. Hotel Cabana reunites Naughty Boy with Sandé on eight collaborations, as well as features from other British artists such George the Poet, Sam Smith, Bastille, Tinie Tempah, Ella Eyre, Gabrielle, Wretch 32, Mic Righteous, Maiday, Chasing Grace, Ed Sheeran, and American rapper Wiz Khalifa, who appears on the album's fourth single overall, "Think About It", with Eyre. Ava Stokes, Tanika, Thabo and Romans make additional appearances on the US version of the album which was released by Virgin Records on 6 May 2014.

Prior to release, Hotel Cabana was promoted with several video trailers which included the collaborating artists arriving at the fictional hotel. It was also preceded by the release of three singles, including the two top-ten Sandé collaborations: "Wonder" and "Lifted", as well as the UK Singles Chart-topper "La La La" which featured Sam Smith. Upon release, the album received generally favourable reviews from music critics, who praised the production, but with some criticism towards the concept, execution and some collaborations. Hotel Cabana made its chart debuts at number two in the UK, number five in Scotland and twenty-five in Ireland.

== Production and composition ==
Hotel Cabana is a pop, R&B, soul and hip hop music record, containing "orchestral flourishes" and "Bollywood inflections". Naughty Boy called Hotel Cabana more than an album, it was an audio-visual concept. "I want it to be an album for our time; it has a concept to it, so it's more like a film in some respects." Speaking about putting together the album, he said "I view it like I'm not just a producer – I'm a director too." During an interview with the Watford Observer, Naughty Boy said "It's a very diverse, musically organic album. There's a lot of dance-future music that's going on now." Explaining the "hotel" concept, he said "the album is like a hotel, and just like guests coming to stay, musicians appear on the album. Each song does stand alone, but all together, the album tells a story, it's one guy's journey, a bit like the song "Hotel California", it's a twisted journey. You can visit, but you can never leave, you can listen to the album, but you won't be able to stop."

Hotel Cabana was recorded at Cabana Studios, a recording block located at Ealing Studios in London; Naughty Boy told Sound on Sound magazine that the studio was always called "Cabana" and that naming his debut album Hotel Cabana was in part inspired by the studio. The entire album was produced using Logic Pro and Reason. The album centres predominately around the themes of fame, "involving debates about the tenuous nature of virtue and fidelity." Speaking on how the album was composed, Naughty Boy used piano and live instruments, adding that it was "just the basics. What they would have had in the 70s." While making the album, Naughty Boy was influenced by M.I.A., Tracy Chapman, Joe Goddard, Woodkid and Major Lazer. On 19 August, Naughty Boy appeared on MistaJam's BBC Radio 1Xtra show to talk about the album track-by-track. "Hotel Cabana where the sleepless kids live" was created following several days Naughty Boy and Sandé spent in the studio together.

George the Poet helps to establish the album's hotel concept through, starting with a monologue at the beginning of the set. This is followed by the album's opener, "Welcome to Cabana" with Emeli Sandé and Tinie Tempah which describes Hotel Cabana as a mysterious place "full of drama" and haunted by "sleepless kids". Meanwhile, "Wonder" and "Lifted", both two of eight collaborations with Sandé, experiment with gospel music. The latter collaboration contains elements of drum and bass and stadium music. The Independent's Andy Gill also described the production on "Lifted" as a "[Naughty Boy] trademark Funky Drummer variant" with "quirkily looped strings and backing vocals". It was the Sandé and Wretch 32 collaboration, "Pluto", that garnered some of the most positive comments, Gill said "Pluto" best exemplified Naughty Boy's signature sound, which was a "blend of vaunting synthesised strings and shuffling groove carries a two-way argument between Sandé and Wretch 32", while Aizlewood called all of the Sandé collaborations "stellar".

When conceiving the song "Hollywood", Naughty Boy originally considered asking Dame Shirley Bassey to sing the vocals, describing the situation as "epic", but in the end he thought it "would be too much". Upon hearing Gabrielle's song "Out of Reach" on the radio he said "her voice is so unique. It's not technically the best voice, but it stands on its own. It's incredible." Digital Spy's Robert Copsey described the collaboration as "the spookiest of them all", centering on "how fame can be fleeting". "No One's Here to Sleep", a collaboration with Bastille, combines indie music and dance-pop, with soulful vocals from Bastille's lead vocalist Dan Smith. The lyrics center around the paranoia of fame.

== Release ==
Hotel Cabana was first released on 23 August 2013 in Germany, Ireland and Spain by EMI and Universal Music. Its UK release came on 26 August 2013 through Naughty Boy's own production company Naughty Boy Recordings and Virgin EMI, with the producer's official website selling 500 limited edition signed copies of the album. In the following week, Hotel Cabana was released in Spain on 30 August and in Italy on 3 September 2013. It was released in Japan on 9 October through EMI Records Japan, while About.com's Bill Lamb confirmed that Capitol Records would be distributing the album at a later date in the United States.

With the absorption of EMI by Universal Music, and the subsequent reorganisation of record labels, Virgin Records and Capitol Records then released Hotel Cabana in the United States. According to the iTunes store, it was released on 6 May 2014, and includes three new songs: "Never Been the Same", featuring Thabo, "Pardon Me", featuring Tanika and Ava Stokes, and "Home", featuring Romans with the deluxe edition containing the bonus tracks from the international standard edition. "La La La" and "Pardon Me" were available as instant downloads upon pre-ordering the album.

== Promotion ==
=== Marketing ===
On 20 September 2012, Naughty Boy uploaded the first visual trailer for Hotel Cabana to his Vevo account. To celebrate the success of single "La La La", in May 2013, Naughty Boy uploaded a mixtape of his inspirations for the album to his SoundCloud page. On 17 July 2013, Naughty Boy premiered a second visual trailer for Hotel Cabana. The video features Sandé, Bastille's Dan Smith, Professor Green, Wretch 32, Gabrielle and Sam Smith all arriving at the fictional Hotel Cabana, where Naughty Boy watches the arrivals on a TV screen. Additionally, on 14 August 2013, "Think About It" featuring Wiz Khalifa and Ella Eyre, received its first play on BBC Radio 1Xtra's MistaJam radio show, while "No One's Here to Sleep" featuring Bastille was released for free as a promotional single as part of iTunes "Single of the Week" in the UK, for the week beginning 26 August 2013. On 18 August 2013, Sandé performed "Lifted" at the mainstage during her set at the 2013 V Festival in Chelmsford, England and reprised the song this time with Naughty Boy later that same day for his set at "Future Stage". Sandé has also performed "Pluto" (without Wretch 32 or Naughty Boy) during her Our Version of Events Tour, the song is included on the DVD of her Live at the Royal Albert Hall concert album.

"No One's Here to Sleep" single was performed in TV series How to Get Away with Murder (season 1) episode 4 "Let's Get to Scooping" starting from 38:06 running time.

=== Tour ===
On 3 September, Naughty Boy announced he was going on a UK tour in support of Hotel Cabana. He played for five dates, beginning with Brighton Concorde on 12 November 2013 and finishing O_{2} ABC in Glasgow on 17 November.

List of UK tour dates and venues
Date	City	Country	Venue
12 November 2013	Brighton	United Kingdom	Concorde 2
13 November 2013	London	United Kingdom	Brixton Electric
15 November 2013	Birmingham	United Kingdom	The Institute
16 November 2013	Manchester	United Kingdom	Club Academy
17 November 2013	Glasgow	United Kingdom	O_{2} ABC

== Singles ==
On 12 August 2012, Music Week magazine confirmed that Naughty Boy's debut single would be titled "Wonder", and would feature frequent collaborator Emeli Sandé. A video directed by Nadia Otzen was produced for the song and it was scheduled to be released 30 September 2012. However, the release of "Wonder" was delayed and the single was released 21 October 2012 instead. Upon release, "Wonder" reached number six in Scotland, eight in Ireland and number ten on the UK Singles Chart. Then over six months later, on 17 May 2013, Naughty Boy released "La La La", featuring British vocalist Sam Smith, was released as the album's second single. Upon release, "La La La" became Naughty Boy's biggest hit to date, topping the UK Singles chart and UK Dance Chart. It also reached number three in Ireland, Italy and Scotland and five in the Netherlands. It serves as the album's lead single in the US, where it has peaked at number nineteen, on the Billboard Hot 100, as of 8 April 2014. "Lifted", another collaboration with Sandé, was released as the album's third single on 18 August 2013, preceding the album by a week. "Lifted" became Naughty Boy's third top-ten single in Scotland and the UK, reaching number eight in both countries. In Ireland, it was slightly less successful, reaching only number twenty-one. "Think About It" featuring Wiz Khalifa and Ella Eyre was released as the album's fourth single on 17 November 2013. "Home", featuring Romans, was released on 20 July 2014 as a single from the US edition of the album.

== Critical reception ==
Professional ratings
Review scores
Source	Rating
AllMusic	3.5/5 stars
Digital Spy	4/5 stars
Gigwise	9/10 stars
The Guardian	3/5 stars
The Independent	4/5 stars
London Evening Standard	4/5 stars
musicOMH	3/5 stars
The Observer	2/5 stars
PopMatters	7/10

The album received generally favourable reviews from music critics. Digital Spy's Robert Copsey gave the album four out of five stars, commenting that "Hotel Cabana succeeds in a task previously thought impossible: giving personality and depth to a features album." In his review, Copsey praised the opening section of the album, but noted that some of the urban-pop was generic and "the concept starts to lose its footing around the halfway mark".

John Aizlewood from the London Evening Standard was confused about what Hotel Cabana was conceptualising but called Naughty Boy's collaborations with Sandé "stellar", praising "Pluto" (also featuring Wretch 32) and "Wonder". Aizlewood said "the result sounds like a compilation album, but a filler-free one where almost every song is capable of standing alone." The Independent's Andy Gill awarded it the "Album of the Week", praising Sandé's performance on the album, described as "an impassioned lead". AllMusic rated it 3.5 out of 5 stars, calling it "unapologetically ostentatious, skillfully constructed pop." The Times rated it 3 out of 5 stars, saying it "proves far more interesting than you might imagine" but was critical of the album's reliance on Sandé and described Ed Sheeran as "her twin in tedium, bleating away".

However, not all of the reception was positive, with The Observer's Kitty Empire describing the album as predictable and "Naughty? Hardly." During her review, Empire said "Hotel Cabana sounds as you would expect: homegrown, high-end urban pop that over-conceptualises the dangers of fame." She praised the Ella Eyre and Wiz Khalifa collaboration "Think About It" but said the remainder of the album was full of "disparate voices [that] give this album the disjointed feel of a showreel." musicOMH noted the album had "a fair few missteps", specifically mentioning Ed Sheeran's contribution as "dull as dishwater – and even that maybe going to [sic] easy on it", concluding that the album was not "coherent".

== Chart performance ==
On 28 August 2013, in the mid-week charts update, the Official Charts Company revealed that Hotel Cabana was a contender to top the UK Albums Chart. At the half-way mark, it was just 3,600 copies behind the mid-week leader Hail to the King by US rock band Avenged Sevenfold. On 1 September 2013, Hotel Cabana made its Scottish Albums Chart debut at number five and its UK Albums Chart debut at number two. On the Irish Albums Chart it debuted at number twenty-five. In Switzerland, the album debuted at number thirty-four but rose to a new peak of number eight in its second week on the chart. Similarly in Belgium, on the Flanders Album Chart it debuted and number eighty-five and 120 on the Wallonia Albums Chart; in its second week it rose to number seventy-four and number seventy on the Flanders and Wallonia album charts respectively.

== Track listing ==
=== International edition ===
Hotel Cabana – Standard edition
No.	Title	Writer(s)	Producer(s)	Length
1.	"Act I" (featuring George the Poet)	George Mpanga; Shahid Khan	Naughty Boy	0:24
2.	"Welcome to Cabana" (featuring Emeli Sandé and Tinie Tempah)	Khan; Sande; Patrick Okogwu; Harry Craze; Hugo Chegwin	Naughty Boy; Craze & Hoax^{[a]}	1:51
3.	"Wonder" (featuring Emeli Sandé)	Sandé; Khan; Chegwin; Craze	Naughty Boy; Craze & Hoax^{[a]}	3:27
4.	"Think About It" (featuring Wiz Khalifa and Ella Eyre)	Khan; Andrea Martin; Cameron Jibril Thomaz; James Murray; Mustafa Omer; Luke Juby	Naughty Boy; Mojam^{[b]}	3:05
5.	"Hollywood" (featuring Gabrielle)	Khan; Sandé	Naughty Boy; Mojam^{[a]}	4:05
6.	"Act II" (featuring George the Poet)	Khan; Mpanga	Naughty Boy	0:20
7.	"La La La" (featuring Sam Smith)	Khan; Jonny Coffer; Al-Hakam El Kaubaisy; Frobisher Mbabazi; Murray; James Napier; Omer; Sam Smith	Naughty Boy; Komi; Mojam^{[b]}	3:42
8.	"One Way" (featuring Mic Righteous and Maiday)	Khan; Rocky Takaloo; Rachel Moulden; Juby	Naughty Boy	3:26
9.	"Pluto" (featuring Emeli Sandé and Wretch 32)	Khan; Sandé; Chegwin; Craze; Juby; Jermaine Scott	Naughty Boy; Craze & Hoax^{[a]}	3:57
10.	"So Strong" (featuring Chasing Grace)	Khan; Grace Ackerman; Philip Plested	Naughty Boy	3:36
11.	"No One's Here to Sleep" (featuring Bastille)	Khan; Dan Smith	Naughty Boy	3:25
12.	"Lifted" (featuring Emeli Sandé)	Khan; Sandé; Chegwin; Craze; Omer; Murray; Coffer	Naughty Boy; Mojam^{[a]}; Craze & Hoax^{[a]}	3:17
13.	"Top Floor (Cabana)" (featuring Ed Sheeran)	Khan; Sheeran	Naughty Boy	2:09
14.	"Epilogue" (featuring George the Poet)	Khan; Mpanga	Naughty Boy	1:28
Total length:				36:39

Bonus tracks
No.	Title	Writer(s)	Producer(s)	Length
15.	"Never Be Your Woman" (Naughty Boy presents Wiley featuring Emeli Sandé)	Khan; Richard Cowie; Bing Crosby; Jyoti Mishra; Irving Wallman; Max Wartell	Naughty Boy	3:31
16.	"Daddy (Ifan Dafydd Remix)" (Emeli Sandé featuring Naughty Boy)	Khan; Grant Mitchell; Murray; Omer; Sandé	Naughty Boy; Mojam^{[a]}; Ifan Dafydd^{[c]}	5:00
17.	"Get Lucky" (featuring Tanika)	Thomas Bangalter; Guy-Manuel de Homem-Christo; Nile Rodgers; Pharrell Williams	Naughty Boy; Wez^{[a]}	4:17
18.	"Lifted" (featuring Emeli Sandé and Professor Green)	Khan; Sandé; Stephen Manderson; Chegwin; Craze; Omer; Murray; Coffer	Naughty Boy; Mojam^{[a]}; Craze & Hoax^{[a]}	4:16
Total length:				53:43

Deluxe edition bonus tracks
No.	Title	Writer(s)	Producer(s)	Length
19.	"Wonder (Kidnap Kid Remix)" (featuring Emeli Sandé)	Khan; Hugo Chegwin; Harry Craze; Sandé		3:54
20.	"La La La (Kaos Remix)" (featuring Sam Smith)	Khan; Coffer; El Kaubaisy; Mbabazi; Murray; Napier; Omer; S. Smith		3:54
21.	"Wonder" (featuring Emeli Sandé) (music video)	Khan; Hugo Chegwin; Harry Craze; Sandé	Nadia Otzen	3:27
22.	"La La La" (featuring Sam Smith) (music video)	Khan; Coffer; El Kaubaisy; Mbabazi; Murray; Napier; Omer; S. Smith	Ian Pons Jewell	4:04
Total length:				68:12

Japan bonus tracks
No.	Title	Writer(s)	Length
19.	"Wonder (Kidnap Kid Remix)" (featuring Emeli Sandé)	Khan; Hugo Chegwin; Harry Craze; Sandé	3:54
20.	"La La La (Kaos Remix)" (featuring Sam Smith)	Khan; Coffer; El Kaubaisy; Mbabazi; Murray; Napier; Omer; S. Smith	3:54
21.	"F**kery (Out of Order)" (featuring Dot Rotten, Sneakbo, Griminal and Mic Righteous)		3:07
22.	"Lifted (Mojam Remix)" (featuring Emeli Sandé)	Khan; Sandé; Chegwin; Craze; Omer; Murray; Coffer	4:37

=== US edition ===
Hotel Cabana – US standard edition
No.	Title	Writer(s)	Producer(s)	Length
1.	"Act I" (featuring George the Poet)	Shahid Khan; George Mpanga	Naughty Boy	0:24
2.	"Welcome to Cabana" (featuring Emeli Sandé and Tinie Tempah)	Khan; Sande; Patrick Okogwu	Naughty Boy; Craze & Hoax^{[a]}	1:51
3.	"Wonder" (featuring Emeli Sandé)	Khan; Hugo Chegwin; Harry Craze; Sandé	Naughty Boy; Craze & Hoax^{[a]}	3:27
4.	"Think About It" (featuring Wiz Khalifa and Ella Eyre)	Khan; Andrea Martin; Cameron Jibril Thomaz; James Murray; Mustafa Omer; Luke Juby	Naughty Boy; Mojam^{[b]}	3:05
5.	"Never Been The Same" (featuring Thabo)	Khan	Naughty Boy	3:29
6.	"Hollywood" (featuring Gabrielle)	Khan; Sandé	Naughty Boy; Mojam^{[a]}	4:05
7.	"Act II" (featuring George the Poet)	Khan; Mpanga	Naughty Boy	0:20
8.	"La La La" (featuring Sam Smith)	Khan; Jonny Coffer; Al-Hakam El Kaubaisy; Frobisher Mbabazi; Murray; James Napier; Omer; Sam Smith	Naughty Boy; Komi; Mojam^{[b]}	3:42
9.	"Pardon Me" (featuring Tanika and Ava Stokes)	Khan; Shakil Ashraf; Uzo Emenike; Sandé	Naughty Boy	2:50
10.	"One Way" (featuring Mic Righteous and Maiday)	Khan; Rocky Takaloo; Rachel Moulden; Juby	Naughty Boy	3:26
11.	"Pluto" (featuring Emeli Sandé and Wretch 32)	Khan; Sandé; Chegwin; Craze; Juby; Jermaine Scott	Naughty Boy; Craze & Hoax^{[a]}	3:57
12.	"So Strong" (featuring Chasing Grace)	Khan; Grace Ackerman; Philip Plested	Naughty Boy	3:36
13.	"No One's Here to Sleep" (featuring Bastille)	Khan; Dan Smith	Naughty Boy	3:25
14.	"Lifted" (featuring Emeli Sandé)	Khan; Sandé; Chegwin; Craze; Omer; Murray; Coffer	Naughty Boy; Mojam^{[a]}; Craze & Hoax^{[a]}	3:17
15.	"Top Floor (Cabana)" (featuring Ed Sheeran)	Khan; Sheeran	Naughty Boy	2:09
16.	"Home" (featuring Romans)	Khan	Naughty Boy	3:26
17.	"Epilogue" (featuring George the Poet)	Khan; Mpanga	Naughty Boy	1:28
Total length:				68:12

US deluxe edition bonus tracks
No.	Title	Writer(s)	Producer(s)	Length
18.	"Never Be Your Woman" (Naughty Boy presents Wiley featuring Emeli Sandé)	Khan; Richard Cowie; Bing Crosby; Jyoti Mishra; Irving Wallman; Max Wartell	Naughty Boy	3:31
19.	"Daddy (Ifan Dafydd Remix)" (Emeli Sandé featuring Naughty Boy)	Khan; Grant Mitchell; Murray; Omer; Sandé	Naughty Boy; Mojam^{[a]}; Ifan Dafydd^{[c]}	5:00
20.	"Get Lucky" (featuring Tanika)	Thomas Bangalter; Guy-Manuel de Homem-Christo; Nile Rodgers; Pharrell Williams	Naughty Boy; Wez^{[a]}	4:17
21.	"Lifted" (featuring Emeli Sandé and Professor Green)	Khan; Sandé; Stephen Manderson; Chegwin; Craze; Omer; Murray; Coffer	Naughty Boy; Mojam^{[a]}; Craze & Hoax^{[a]}	4:16
Total length:				53:43

Notes

- ^{^[a]} de-notes additional production by
- ^{^[b]} de-notes co-production by
- On the digital editions of the album, track 15 is credited as "featuring Wiley and Emeli Sandé" but on the CD-edition of the album it is credited as "Naughty Boy Presents Wiley featuring Emeli Sandé".
- "Never Be Your Woman" contains a sample of White Town's 1997 single "Your Woman", written by Joyti Mishra, which in turn was based on "My Woman" written by Bing Crosby, Irving Wallman, Max Wartell.
- "Get Lucky" is a cover of Daft Punk's 2013 hit single "Get Lucky".

== Personnel ==
Adapted from album liner.

Recording

- Recorded at Cabana Studios (Ealing Studios) in Ealing, West London.
- Mixing/overdubbing at Genesis Sound Studios, Fisher Lane Farm in Surrey, UK.
- Audio mastering by Stuart Hawkes at Metropolis Mastering Studios in London, UK.

Vocals

- Grace Ackerman (track 10)
- Kahlia Bakosi (background vocals, track 2)
- Ella Eyre (track 4)
- Gabrielle (track 5)
- George the Poet (tracks 1, 6 and 14)
- Professor Green (track 18)
- Luke Juby (background vocals, track 8, 9 and 13)
- Wiz Khalifa (track 4)
- Maiday (track 8)
- Mcknasty (background vocals track 17)
- Philip Plested (track 10)
- Romans (US edition track 16)
- Mic Righteous (track 8)
- Emeli Sandé (tracks 2, 3, 9, 12, 15, 16, 18 and 19)
- Ed Sheeran (track 13)
- Dan Smith (track 11)
- Sam Smith (track 7)
- Ava Stokes (US edition track 9)
- Tanika (track 17 and US edition track 9)
- Thabo (US edition track 5)
- Tinie Tempah (track 2)
- Wiley (track 15)
- Wretch 32 (track 9)

Musicians and technicians

- Wez Clarke – mixdown engineer, additional programming
- Jonny Coffer – strings
- Craze & Hoax (Harry Craze and Hugo Chegwin) – producers, instruments, programming, recording technicians
- Ifan Dafydd – remixer, additional production
- Luke Juby – piano, saxophone, strings, acoustic guitar, bass strings, bass
- Komi – producer, instruments, programming
- Frobisher "Froby" Mbabzi – keyboards
- Mojam (Mustafa Omer and James Murray) – producers, recording technicians, instruments, programming
- Check Morris – artwork
- Naughty Boy – producer, recording technician, instruments, programming
- Daniela Rivera – assistant mastering engineer
- Jonny Rocha – bass
- Ed Sheeran – guitar
- Sunny – recording engineer
- Jasmin Tadjiky – instruments, programming
- Phil Tan – mastering engineer

== Charts ==
=== Weekly charts ===
Weekly chart performance for Hotel Cabana
Chart (2013–2014)	Peak position
Australian Digital Albums (ARIA)	30
Austrian Albums (Ö3 Austria)	33
Belgian Albums (Ultratop Flanders)	74
Belgian Albums (Ultratop Wallonia)	70
Dutch Albums (MegaCharts)	46
French Albums (SNEP)	193
German Albums (Media Control)	30
Irish Albums (IRMA)	25
Italian Albums (FIMI)	78
Scottish Albums (OCC)	5
South Korean International Albums (Gaon)	39
Swiss Albums (Hitparade)	8
UK Albums (OCC)	2
US Heatseekers Albums (Billboard)	6

=== Year-end charts ===
Year-end chart performance for Hotel Cabana
Chart (2013)	Position
UK Albums (OCC)	193

== Certifications ==
Certifications for Hotel Cabana
Region	Certification	Certified units/sales
Poland (ZPAV)	Gold	10,000^{‡}
United Kingdom (BPI)	Silver	60,000^{*}
^{*} Sales figures based on certification alone.^{‡} Sales+streaming figures based on certification alone.

== Release history ==
Release history and formats for Hotel Cabana
Region	Date	Version	Format	Label
Belgium	23 August 2013	Standard edition	Digital download	Universal Music
Germany	23 August 2013	Standard edition	Compact disc (CD); digital download	EMI; Universal Music
Germany	23 August 2013	Deluxe edition	Digital download	EMI; Universal Music
Ireland	23 August 2013	Standard edition	Digital download	EMI; Universal Music
Ireland	23 August 2013	Deluxe edition	Digital download	EMI; Universal Music
Netherlands	23 August 2013	Standard edition	Digital download	Universal Music
Spain	23 August 2013	Standard edition	Digital download	Universal Music
Spain	23 August 2013	Deluxe edition	Digital download	Universal Music
United Kingdom	26 August 2013	Standard edition	CD; digital download	Naughty Boy; Virgin EMI
United Kingdom	26 August 2013	Deluxe edition	Digital download	Naughty Boy; Virgin EMI
Australia	30 August 2013	Standard edition	CD; digital download	Universal Music
Italy	3 September 2013	Standard edition	CD; digital download	Universal Music
Italy	3 September 2013	Deluxe edition	Digital download	Universal Music
Japan	9 October 2013	—N/a	CD	EMI Records Japan
United States	6 May 2014	Standard edition	CD; digital download	Virgin; Capitol Records
United States	6 May 2014	Deluxe edition	CD; digital download	Virgin; Capitol Records
