= Never Be Your Woman =

Single by Wiley featuring Emeli Sandé
- Released: 28 February 2010
- Genre: UK garage
- Length: 2:27 (Shy FX radio edit); 3:32 (original version)
- Label: Relentless; Virgin
- Songwriter(s): Shahid Khan; Richard Cowie; Bing Crosby; Jyoti Mishra; Irving Wallman; Max Wartell
- Producer(s): Naughty Boy

Wiley singles chronology
"Sidetracked" (2010)	"Never Be Your Woman" (2010)	"Now or Never" (2011)

Emeli Sandé singles chronology
"Diamond Rings" (2009)	"Never Be Your Woman" (2010)	"Heaven" (2011)

"Never Be Your Woman" is a song by British rapper Wiley featuring British singer and songwriter Emeli Sandé and produced by Naughty Boy. It was released on 28 February 2010 by Relentless Records (Virgin Records) and samples White Town's 1997 number-one single "Your Woman", which in turn features a trumpet line taken from the 1932 recording "My Woman" by Lew Stone & his Monseigneur Band. "Never Be Your Woman" is included as a bonus track on Naughty Boy's debut album, Hotel Cabana (2013).

== Critical reception ==
Fraser McAlpine of BBC Chart Blog gave the song a positive review stating:

In these globally conscious times – where wasting precious resources on trivial things would be a shooting offense, if we could only spare the bullets – everyone loves a good recycler. Music is no different, in this regard. You can recycle old sounds, or old guitars, old ideas, old clothes or old poses. You can re-use the swagger of an olden-days singer or the hairstyle of some rock grandad or other. It's all there for the taking.

The trick is to find something which hasn't been recycled so often it loses its original shape and starts to get a bit baggy at the seams, so you end up having to basically remake the whole thing from scratch (Glee people, I am looking at you).

Credit to wiley old Mr Wiley then, for finding a sample of a late '90s hit which itself contains a sample of an old song from the past. This is therefore double recycling. He can basically drive a Hummer into a panda now, and he'll still be ahead of most of us..

== Commercial performance ==
According to midweek figures, "Never Be Your Woman" was scheduled to debut on the UK Singles Chart at number 5, selling just under 20,000. It was revealed on 7 March 2010 that "Never Be Your Woman" entered the UK Singles Chart at its current peak position of number 8, marking Wiley's second UK top 10 hit, after "Wearing My Rolex", which peaked at number 2 back in 2008. As of 4 January 2011, "Never Be Your Woman" has sold 120,000 units in the UK.

== Track listings ==
UK iTunes single

1. "Never Be Your Woman" (Shy FX Radio Edit) – 2:26
2. "Never Be Your Woman" (Original Version) – 3:32
3. "Never Be Your Woman" (Hervé re-work) – 3:40

CD single

1. "Never Be Your Woman" (Shy FX Radio Edit) – 2:29
2. "Never Be Your Woman" (Original Version) – 3:32

Original EP

1. "Never Be Your Woman" (Original Version) – 3:32 (In the Amazon.uk EP, the original version was replaced by the Shy FX remix)
2. "Never Be Your Woman" (Hervé re-work) – 3:40
3. "Never Be Your Woman" (Jaymo & Andy George's Moda mix) – 4:50
4. "Never Be Your Woman" (Craze & Hoax remix) – 3:13
5. "Never Be Your Woman" (Solo UK 'Loves Garage' remix) – 4:02

== Release history ==
Region	Date	Format	Label
United Kingdom	28 February 2010	Digital download	Relentless; Virgin
United Kingdom	1 March 2010	CD single	Relentless; Virgin

== Charts ==
Chart (2010)	Peak position
Scotland (OCC)	18
UK Singles (OCC)	8
UK Hip Hop/R&B (OCC)	4

== Certifications ==
Region	Certification	Certified units/sales
United Kingdom (BPI)	Silver	200,000^{‡}
^{‡} Sales+streaming figures based on certification alone.
