= Naughty Boy =

English DJ and record producer (born 1981)

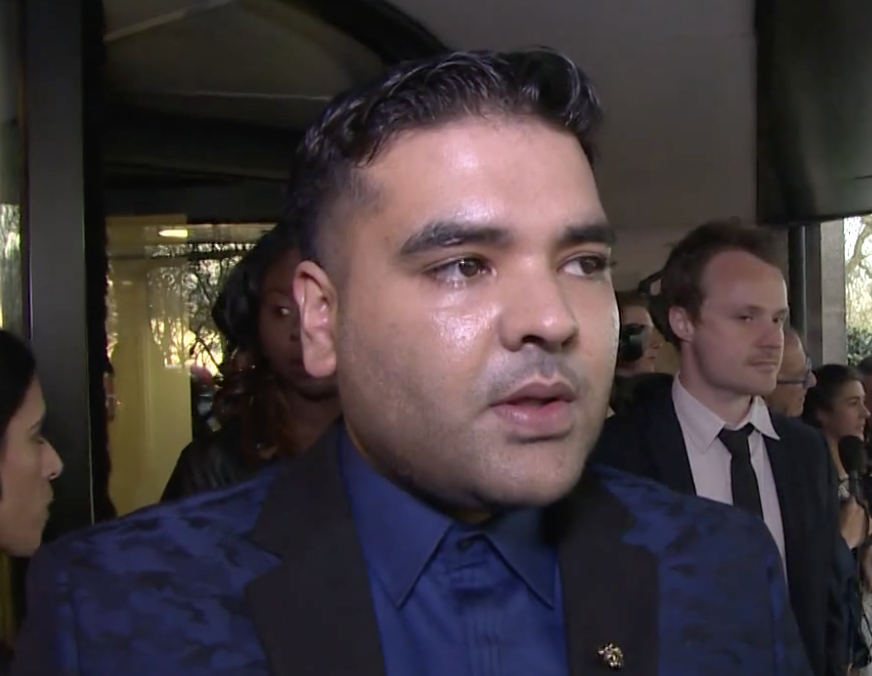
- Naughty Boy at the fifth annual Asian Awards (2015)

Background information
- Born: Shahid Khan; 1 January 1981 (age 45); Watford, Hertfordshire, England
- Genres: UK garage; R&B; pop
- Occupations: Disc jockey; record producer; music programmer; songwriter
- Years active: 2005–present
- Labels: Naughty Boy; Virgin EMI

Shahid Khan (Urdu: شاهد خان; born 1 January 1981), known professionally as Naughty Boy, is an English DJ, record producer, music programmer and songwriter. In 2012, Khan signed a three-year publishing deal with Sony ATV, as well as a recording contract with Virgin EMI Records to release his debut studio album, Hotel Cabana (2013). Its first two singles, "Wonder" (with Emeli Sandé) and "Lifted" (with Sandé), both peaked within the top ten of the UK singles chart, while its third, "La La La" (featuring Sam Smith), peaked atop the chart. His 2015 single, "Runnin' (Lose It All)" (with Beyoncé and Arrow Benjamin), received double platinum certification by the British Phonographic Industry (BPI).

Naughty Boy and Sandé also formed a writing and production partnership, leading her to sign with Virgin and EMI as a recording artist. Khan produced her debut studio album Our Version of Events in 2012, and subsequently began doing so for other artists including Leona Lewis, JLS, Cheryl, Jennifer Hudson, Alesha Dixon and Tinie Tempah, among others.

== Early life ==
Shahid Khan was born on 1 January 1981 in Watford, Hertfordshire. His parents being originally from Pakistan, and explaining the importance of his Pakistani identity, having also been in a school near Rawalpindi for two years, he says that he grew up listening to Pakistani music and watching Pakistani movies more than being influenced by Western culture, admiring the likes of Sultan Rahi and Mustafa Qureshi, ultimately professing that "I am a very proud Pakistani and I celebrate that". Educated at Westfield Academy, Watford, initially, Khan was studying Business and Marketing at London Guildhall University (now London Metropolitan University), but during his first semester, he decided to drop out and did various part-time jobs in Domino's Pizza and Watford General Hospital. He won £44,000 on Deal or No Deal and spent the money on a studio in his parents' garden, as well as giving his parents £15,000 and buying an Audi sports car. He "decided to follow his ambition to write and produce his own music, under the name Naughty Boy Recordings." In the background, Khan was recording songs in his parents' garden shed in Charlock Way in Watford, Hertfordshire. The finances allowed Khan to upscale production from the garden shed to a studio in Ealing, West London. Eventually, he got a three-year contract with Sony ATV, and a one-album record deal with Virgin Records (EMI Records).

Khan applied to The Prince's Trust in 2005, where he was awarded a grant of £5,000 to help start up his business. Speaking to the Watford Observer in 2009 about the opportunity, Khan said "The Prince's Trust has a scheme where they want to help people who they feel can set up their own business. I wanted to make music but I didn't have any equipment. They said they wanted to help me." That same year, Khan appeared on Channel 4's hit day-time gameshow Deal or No Deal, where he won £44,000, further enabling him to purchase equipment and begin recording. The producer now bases his recordings at his studio in Ealing, West London.

== Music career ==
=== 2009–2012: Beginnings and producing ===
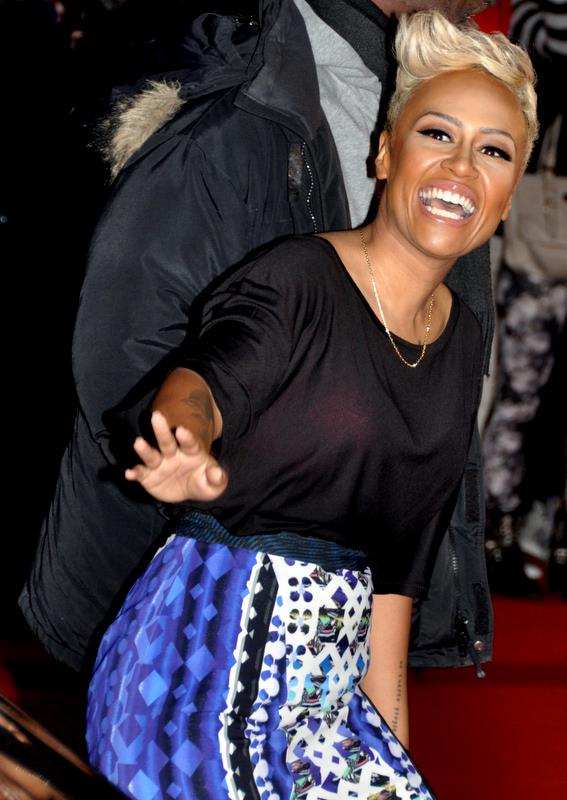
Emeli Sandé frequently writes with Naughty Boy.

The producer burst on to the music scene in 2009, by co-writing and producing Chipmunk's hit single "Diamond Rings", featuring Emeli Sandé. Khan would once again work with Sandé, this time on Wiley's "Never Be Your Woman" (2010), a cover of White Town's "Your Woman" (1997). Sandé later earned a record deal with Virgin Records, with Khan co-writing and producing her debut album, Our Version of Events. Naughty Boy was formally introduced and credited as an artist on Sandé's second single "Daddy", though he doesn't actually perform on the track.

Khan has also worked with Alesha Dixon, JLS, Lily Allen, Alexandra Burke and Jennifer Hudson. He also produced records for Professor Green, Cheryl Cole and Tinie Tempah. Khan worked with Sandé to produce and co-write Leona Lewis' 2012 comeback single "Trouble" which features Childish Gambino. Khan also wrote and produced "When It Hurts" and "Mountains" for Lewis' album Glassheart; However, "Mountains" was re-recorded by Sandé and put on her own album Our Version of Events. He also worked on records for Rihanna including "Half of Me" (co-produced with Stargate), "Side Effects of You" for Fantasia Barrino and co-produced "Craziest Things" with will.i.am for Cheryl Cole.

=== 2012–2014: Hotel Cabana ===
Khan also spent time, throughout the development of his career, working on his own debut album titled Hotel Cabana, which was scheduled to be released under his moniker "Naughty Boy" by Virgin EMI Records in 2013. The album's first single "Wonder" features frequent collaborator Sandé on the lead vocals. It was released on 30 September 2012 and also was the leading single from the re-release of Sandé's debut album, Our Version of Events, after already appearing on the US version of the album. It peaked at number ten on the UK Singles Chart.

British singer Gabrielle also worked with Naughty Boy for Hotel Cabana on a song called "Hollywood", which was initially tipped to be the album's second single, with the album following in February 2013. Gabrielle also revealed that fellow British singer-songwriter Ed Sheeran and British rapper Tinie Tempah will also feature on Hotel Cabana. Both Tempah and Sheeran have worked with Naughty Boy on previous records. It is the album's title song, "Hotel Cabana" which features Tempah. A trailer for Hotel Cabana was premiered on Naughty Boy's Vevo account on 20 September 2012. It states Hotel Cabana is "directed by Naughty Boy, starring Emeli Sandé, Tinie Tempah, Professor Green, Gabrielle and George the Poet". Of the album, Khan's opinion of it was "It has a concept to it, so it's more like a film in some respects", claiming "I'm not just a producer – I'm a director too". However, it did not happen until May 2013, that the second single "La La La" featuring Sam Smith was released. It reached number one in the UK, three in Ireland and three in Scotland. The album was released on 26 August 2013. It peaked at number two in the UK.

After completing work on his own album, in 2013, Khan resumed production for other artists. He worked on pop records for American singer Britney Spears, as well as joining Spears' sessions with producer William Orbit. British singer Lily Allen also asked Khan to produce records for her upcoming album. Additionally, he teamed up with Sandé and Katy Perry in New York to work on a song for Perry's then upcoming album, Prism (2013).

=== 2015–present: The X Factor, planned second studio album and I’m A Celebrity…Get Me Out of Here! ===
In March 2015, it was confirmed that Naughty Boy had worked with then-One Direction member Zayn Malik for one of the tracks of his second album. Malik exited the band shortly after this announcement, which led to many One Direction fans blaming Naughty Boy for Malik's departure.

On 16 September 2015, Naughty Boy announced that he would release a song titled "Runnin' (Lose It All)" featuring Beyoncé and Arrow Benjamin. On the same date, he shared the artwork for the single, its lyrics, a 15-second sound snippet along with a video through his Instagram account and began a countdown until its online release. The following day, on 17 September 2015, "Runnin' (Lose It All)" premiered online. It was available for digital download on the iTunes Store on 18 September 2015. "Should've Been Me", featuring vocals from Kyla and Popcaan was released as the second single on 18 November 2016. The song has peaked at number 4 on the UK Singles Chart. "One Chance to Dance", featuring vocals from Joe Jonas was released as the third single on 20 October 2017.

On 13 September 2017, Naughty Boy released a reworked edition of the Jackson 5's song "Dancing Machine" featuring vocals from Laura Mvula under the name of "Naughty Town", from an upcoming Motown covers album. According to The Evening Standard, Naughty Boy has also collaborated with Justin Timberlake and Dua Lipa on the album. In December 2017, Naughty Boy along with Wyclef Jean appeared on the final of the fourteenth series of The X Factor, guest performing "Dimelo" with contestants Rak-Su, his fellow Watford natives. Rak-Su won and the performance was released as the winner's single.

In January 2018, Naughty Boy announced his second album had experienced some delays due to legal issues; he wanted to call the album Now That's What I Call Naughty, but was legally challenged over its similarity to the Now That's What I Call Music! compilation album series. Describing the album as a playlist, he said "with my new album I wanted to make a real sick playlist that anyone and everyone can listen to." At the time of writing, he had completed studio sessions with Dua Lipa, Mike Posner, MNEK, Ray BLK, Joe Jonas, WizKid, Bebe Rexha, Paloma Faith, Tom Walker, Miguel, Calum Scott, Shenseea, Popcaan, Kyla, Wyclef Jean, Craig David and Julia Michaels but refused to confirm which were for his own album.

On 18 April 2018, he released his collaboration with artist Ray BLK and Wyclef Jean titled "All or Nothing". On 7 December 2018, "Bungee Jumping" was released featuring vocals from Emeli Sandé and Rahat Fateh Ali Khan. On 22 March 2019, "Undo" was released featuring Calum Scott and Jamaican dancehall artist Shenseea. At the time of writing (April 2019) Naughty Boy's second studio album was set for release in Autumn 2019. From 9–15 December, Naughty Boy appeared was part of the 'industry' panel for The X Factor spin off series, The X Factor: The Band, launched to try and find the UK's next biggest band. In July 2020, Naughty Boy was still working on the album. He said "But for my new album, I want (a song) to be entirely in Urdu and Hindi... It's the last song I need to complete (for the album) and I'm so excited for it." There were plans to release two singles in the Summer, with Naughty Boy confirming that "the two tracks will feature UK rappers Jaykae, Mist and American singer Harloe". He was also set to collaborate with tv personality Gemma Collins but this did not happen in the end as he chose to focus on his album. According to English DJ Jordan North, Naughty Boy was originally supposed to appear as contestant on series 20 of the British reality tv show I'm a Celebrity...Get Me Out of Here! (2020) but dropped out at the last minute; North ended up replacing Naughty Boy as a contestant.

Naughty Boy has also been working with British actress Jemima Khan and Indian Director Shekhar Kapur on their project What's Love Got to do with It?, due in 2022.

In 2021, Naughty Boy was announced as a contestant on the twenty-first series of I'm a Celebrity...Get Me Out of Here!. Despite threatening to leave multiple times, and having regular arguments with campmates, he survived 16 days before he was eliminated on 8 December 2021.

== Personal life ==
In 2017, Naughty Boy's mother was diagnosed with dementia, and he has openly spoken about using music as therapy to help his mother cope with the condition. He since joined the Dementia UK charity as an ambassador in 2020. Explaining his decision to join, he said "I'm so proud to announce that I'm an ambassador of Dementia UK and I hope that I can use my profile to raise awareness of the cause and the charity. With my mum's ever-changing condition and the pressures this places on the wider family, I understand how beneficial an Admiral Nurse would be."

Naughty Boy has also campaigned with local residents of Watford to change the Atria Shopping Centre back to its original name of "The Harlequin".

== Discography ==
=== Albums ===
Title	Album details	Peak chart positions							Certifications
Title	Album details	UK	AUS Dig.	GER	IRE	ITA	NLD	SWI	Certifications
Hotel Cabana	Released: 23 August 2013; Format: CD, digital download; Label: Naughty Boy, Virgin EMI	2	30	30	25	78	46	8	BPI: Silver

=== Singles ===
==== As lead artist ====
Title	Year	Peak chart positions										Certifications	Album
Title	Year	UK	AUS	FRA	GER	ITA	IRE	NLD	SPA	SWI	US	Certifications	Album
"Never Be Your Woman"^{[A]} (Naughty Boy presents Wiley featuring Emeli Sandé)	2010	8	—	—	—	—	—	—	—	—	—	BPI: Silver	Non-album single
"Wonder" (featuring Emeli Sandé)	2012	10	—	—	—	—	8	—	—	—	—	BPI: Silver	Hotel Cabana
"La La La" (featuring Sam Smith)	2013	1	5	6	2	1	3	4	4	2	19	BPI: 3× Platinum; ARIA: 2× Platinum; BVMI: 3× Gold; FIMI: 2× Platinum; RIAA: 2× Platinum	Hotel Cabana
"Lifted" (featuring Emeli Sandé)	2013	8	—	—	55	—	21	63	—	61	—		Hotel Cabana
"Think About It" (featuring Wiz Khalifa and Ella Eyre)	2013	78	—	—	—	—	—	—	—	—	—		Hotel Cabana
"Home" (featuring Romans)	2014	45	—	—	—	—	—	—	—	—	—		Hotel Cabana
"Runnin' (Lose It All)" (featuring Beyoncé and Arrow Benjamin)	2015	4	22	1	85	59	12	19	9	23	90	BPI: 2× Platinum; ARIA: Gold; FIMI: Gold	Non-album singles
"Should've Been Me" (featuring Kyla and Popcaan)	2016	61	—	—	—	—	61	—	—	—	—	BPI: Silver	Non-album singles
"One Chance to Dance" (featuring Joe Jonas)	2017	—	—	—	—	—	—	—	—	—	—		Non-album singles
"All or Nothing" (with Ray BLK and Wyclef Jean)	2018	—	—	—	—	—	—	—	—	—	—		Non-album singles
"Bungee Jumping" (featuring Emeli Sandé and Rahat Fateh Ali Khan)	2018	—	—	—	—	—	—	—	—	—	—		Non-album singles
"Undo" (with Calum Scott and Shenseea)	2019	—	—	—	—	—	—	—	—	—	—		Non-album singles
"Live Before I Die" (with Mike Posner)	2019	—	—	—	—	—	—	—	—	—	—		Non-album singles
"Blow Trees" (featuring Mist, Abra Cadabra, Tunde and Wardz)	2024	—	—	—	—	—	—	—	—	—	—		Non-album singles
"The One" (featuring Lost Girl & Maeta)	2025	—	—	—	—	—	—	—	—	—	—		
"—" denotes a recording that did not chart or was not released in that territory.

==== As featured artist ====
Title	Year	Peak chart positions				Certifications	Album
Title	Year	UK	BEL (FL)	FIN	SCO	Certifications	Album
"Daddy" (Emeli Sandé featuring Naughty Boy)	2011	21	58	5	20		Our Version of Events
"Dimelo" (Rak-Su featuring Wyclef Jean and Naughty Boy)	2017	2	—	—	2	BPI: Gold	Non-album singles
"Stay Here in the Sun" (TALA featuring Naughty Boy)	2018	—	—	—	—		Non-album singles
"—" denotes a recording that did not chart or was not released in that territory.

== Awards and nominations ==
In January 2015, Khan was nominated for the Young Achiever award at the British Muslim Awards.

At The Asian Awards in 2016, Khan was honoured with the Outstanding Achievement in Music Award.

=== Berlin Music Video Awards ===
Year	Award	Work	Result
2016	Best Concept	Runnin‘ (Lose It All)	Nominated

=== Brit Awards ===
Year	Award	Work	Result
2014	Single of the Year	"La La La"	Nominated
2014	British Video of the Year	"La La La"	Nominated
2016	British Video of the Year	"Runnin' (Lose It All)"	Nominated

=== iHeartRadio Music Awards ===
Year	Award	Work	Result
2014	Dance Song of the Year	"La La La"	Nominated

=== MOBO Awards ===
Year	Award	Work	Result
2013	Best Song	"La La La"	Won
2013	Best Video	"La La La"	Won

=== YouTube Music Awards ===
Year	Award	Work	Result
2013	YouTube Breakthrough	"La La La"	Nominated

=== Brit Asia TV Music Awards ===
Year	Award	Result
2012	Best Non Asian Music Producer	Won
2013	Best Non Asian Music Producer	Won

== Notes ==
- ^{^[A]}"Never Be Your Woman" was released as a standalone single in 2010; an alternative version dubbed "Never Be Your Woman (Bonus Track)" features on the album, Hotel Cabana.
