= Think About It (Naughty Boy song) =

Single by Naughty Boy featuring Wiz Khalifa and Ella Eyre

from the album Hotel Cabana
- Released: 17 November 2013
- Genre: R&B; pop; hip hop
- Length: 3:05
- Label: Naughty Boy; Virgin EMI
- Songwriter(s): Shahid Khan; Andrea Martin; Cameron Jibril Thomaz; Luke Juby; Mustafa Omer; James Murray
- Producer(s): Naughty Boy

Naughty Boy singles chronology
"Lifted" (2013)	"Think About It" (2013)	"Home" (2014)

Wiz Khalifa singles chronology
"23" (2013)	"Think About It" (2013)	"Feelin' Myself" (2013)

Ella Eyre singles chronology
"Waiting All Night" (2013)	"Think About It" (2013)	"Deeper" (2013)

"Think About It" is a song by British record producer Naughty Boy, featuring vocals from American rapper Wiz Khalifa and English singer Ella Eyre. It was released on 17 November 2013 as the fourth single from Naughty Boy's debut album, Hotel Cabana. The song entered the UK Singles Chart at number 80 and climbed to number 78 on the second week. It premiered on MistaJam's BBC Radio 1Xtra show on 14 August 2013. A remix by Wilkinson was given the title of Zane Lowe's Hottest Record in the World. It is featured in the soundtrack to the 2014 film Vampire Academy. The music video was released on 29 October 2013.

== Track listing ==
Album version
No.	Title	Length
1.	"Think About It" (featuring Wiz Khalifa and Ella Eyre)	3:05

Digital download – EP
No.	Title	Length
1.	"Think About It" (Wilkinson Remix)	4:39
2.	"Think About It" (Calyx & TeeBee Remix)	4:15
3.	"Think About It" (East Freaks Remix)	5:20
4.	"Think About It" (TWRK Remix)	3:50
5.	"Think About It" (Eagles For Hands Remix)	4:33
6.	"Think About It" (TORN Remix)	5:28
7.	"Think About It" (TÂCHES Remix)	4:14

== Charts ==
Chart (2013)	Peak position
UK Hip Hop/R&B (OCC)	12
UK Singles (OCC)	78

== Release history ==
Country	Release date	Format	Label
United Kingdom	17 November 2013	Digital download	Virgin Records
