= High and Low =

High and Low and Highs and Lows may refer to:

== Film and TV ==
- High and Low (1933 film), a French drama
- High and Low (1963 film), a Japanese film directed by Akira Kurosawa
- "High and Low" (CSI), an episode of the TV series CSI: Crime Scene Investigation
- High&Low, a Japanese action media franchise
  - High&Low The Movie, a 2016 Japanese film
- Highs and Lows, a Hong Kong television series
- Highs and Lows (QI episode)

== Art and books ==
- High and Low, a 1966 collection of poems by John Betjeman
- Hi-And-Low, a 1996 manga by Kouta Hirano

== Music ==
- "High and Low" (Empire of the Sun song), 2016
- "High and Low" (Tove Styrke song), 2011
- "High & Low" (song), a 2023 song by Gemma Hayes
- Highs & Lows, a 2016 song by Emeli Sandé
- "High and Low", a song by Howard Dietz and Arthur Schwartz from the 1931 musical The Band Wagon
- "High and Low", a 2006 song by Greg Laswell
- "Hi & Low", a song by boy band the Wanted on their 2010 album The Wanted
- High & Low Down, a 1971 album by Louisiana blues musician Lightnin' Slim
- "Highs and Lows", a 2026 song by Kanye West from his album Bully

== See also ==
- High-low pricing, a form of retail pricing
- High Low (disambiguation)
- Hi-Lo (disambiguation)
