= Hilo (disambiguation) =

Hilo, Hawaii, is a town and census-designated place on the island of Hawaii.

Hilo may also refer to:

- Hilo Chen (born 1942), Taiwanese-born American painter
- Isaac Chelo, also spelled Helo, 14th century rabbi
- Sattar Jabbar Hilo, Mandaean priest from Iraq
- the title character of Judd Winick's Hilo graphic novel series
- Hilo International Airport, Hawaii
- Hilo High School, Hawaii
- Hilo (soil), the official state soil of Hawaii
- Ilo, Peru, a port city that was sometimes spelled Hilo
- USS Hilo, a yacht used as a motor torpedo boat tender during World War II
- HiLo, a supermarket in Trinidad and Tobago – see Cannings Foods Limited
- 342431 Hilo, an asteroid
- HiLo, a 2018 album by Jack Stauber

== See also ==
- Hiló Formation, a geological formation in the Colombian Andes
- The HiLo Club (also Hilo or Hi-Lo), a bar and nightclub in Oklahoma City, Oklahoma, United States
- Hi-Lo (disambiguation)
