= Culm (botany) =

Above-ground stem of a grass or sedge

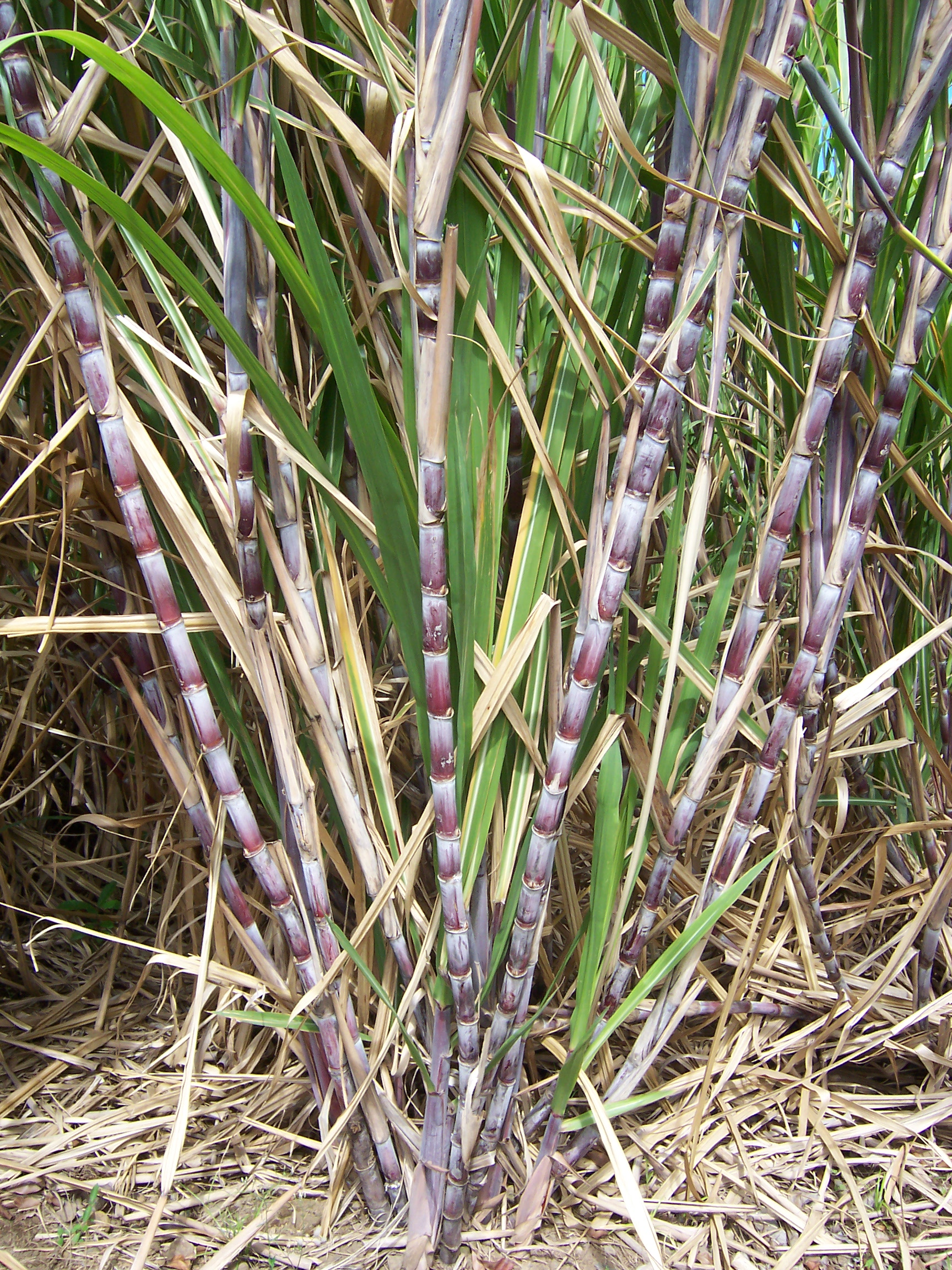
Culms of sugarcane

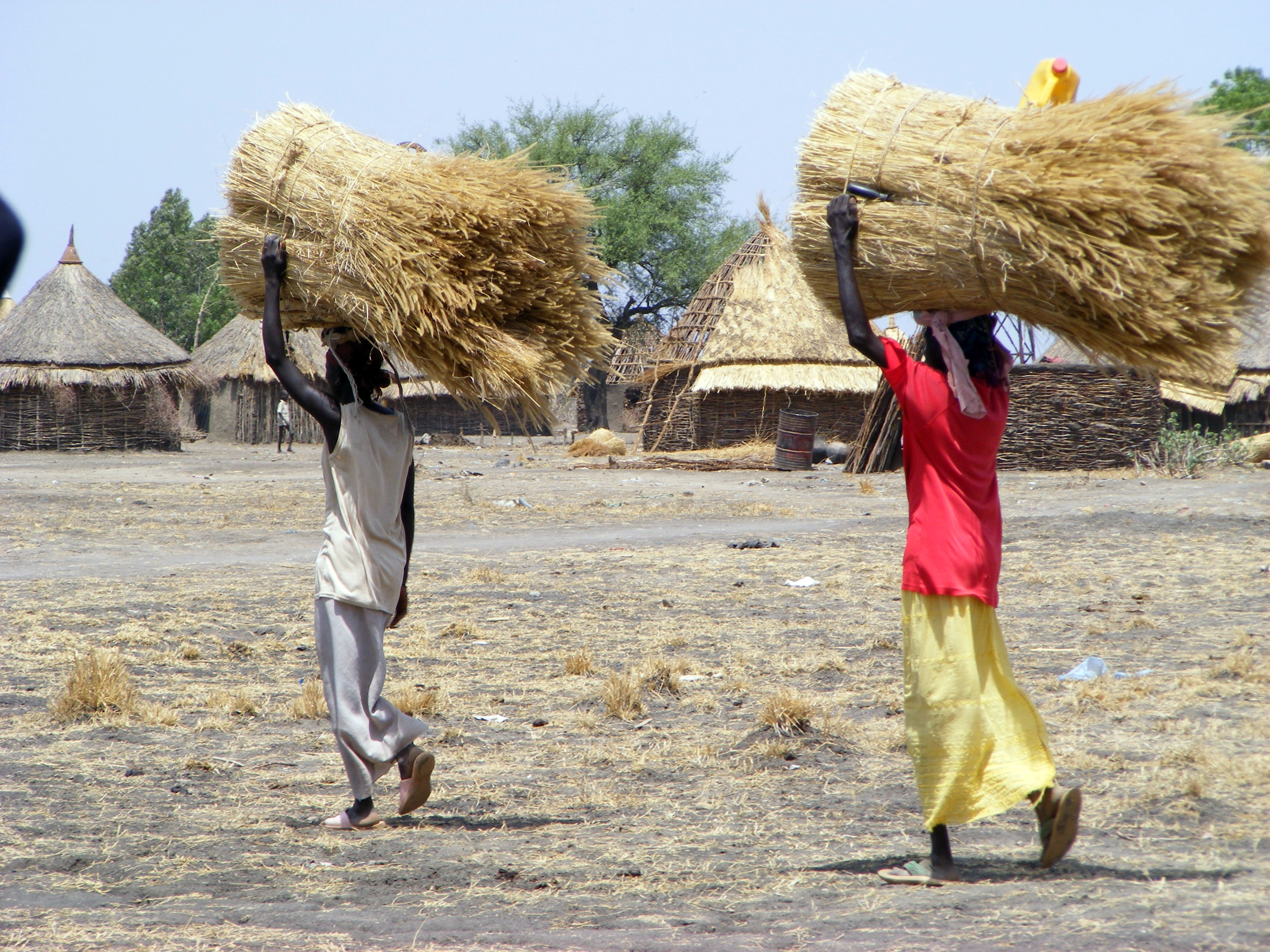
Use for building roofs in Ethiopia

A culm is the aerial (above-ground) stem of a grass or sedge. It is derived from the Latin word culmus, meaning 'stalk'. It originally referred to the stem of any type of plant.

In horticulture or agriculture, it is especially used to describe the stalk or woody stems of bamboo, cane or grain grasses.

== Malting ==
In the production of malted grains, the culms refer to the rootlets of the germinated grains. The culms are normally removed in a process known as "deculming" after kilning when producing barley malt, but form an important part of the product when making sorghum or millet malt. These culms are very nutritious and are sold off as animal feed.
