= Resin wicker =

Heavy-duty textile woven with synthetic materials

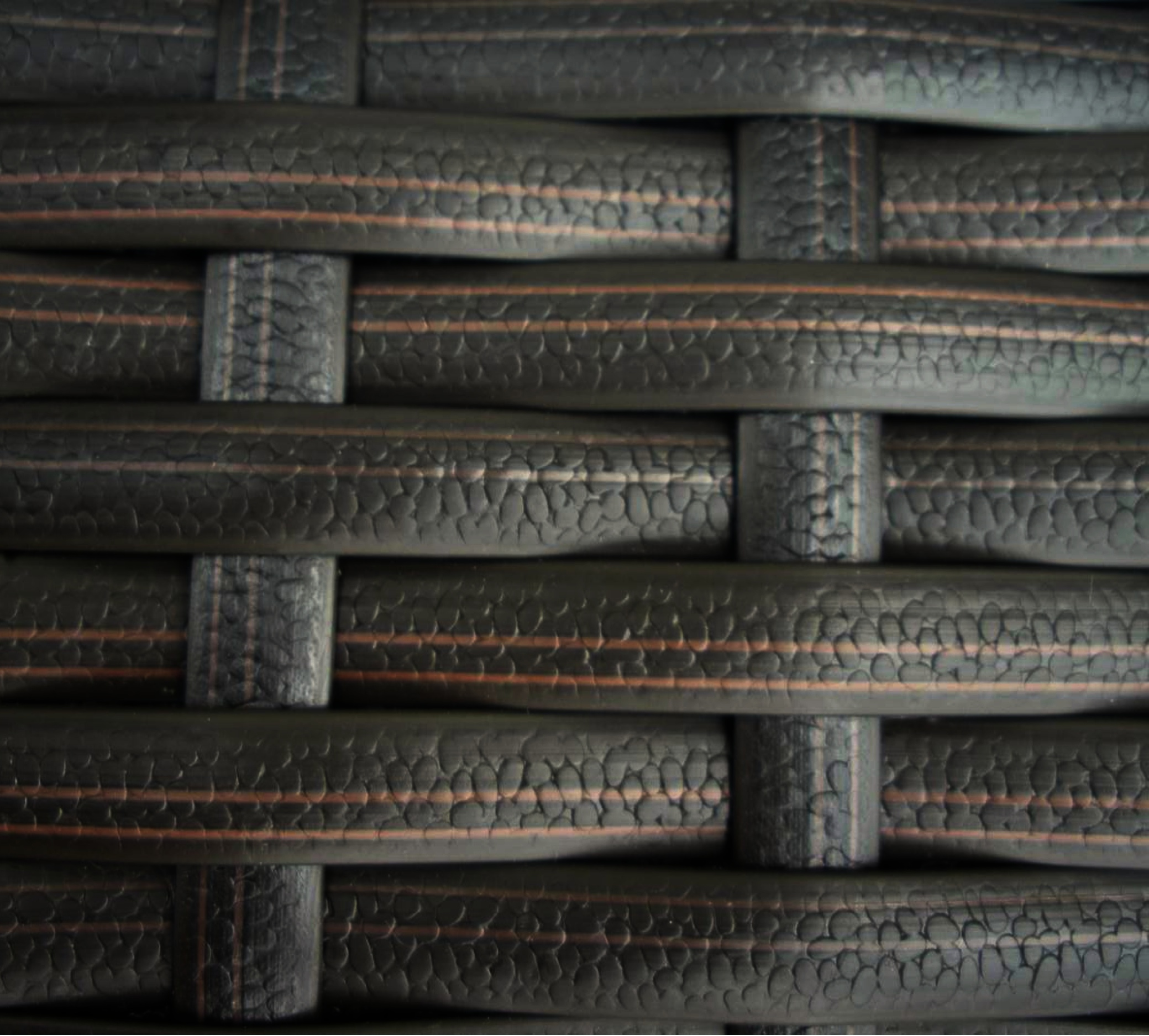
Resin wicker close-up

Resin wicker, also known as all-weather wicker, is a type of heavy-duty textile made from synthetic resin, such as polyethylene, and woven to imitate traditional wicker.

It is primarily manufactured for use in outdoor garden furniture. In the UK, outdoor furniture made from resin wicker is sometimes referred to as "rattan garden furniture" because the traditional rattan materials, which were traditionally used have fallen out of fashion.

== Wicker ==
The term "wicker" is often use in to refer to two things: a type of material, and the method used to create it. Wicker works are generally meant to be lightweight, flexible, and durable; to achieve this, the materials used must have those properties, and the weave pattern must reinforce the structure while using as little material as possible to avoid becoming too heavy or rigid.

== Materials ==
Historically, materials derived from plants have been used to manufacture a variety of wicker products, such as baskets, trays, and both indoor and outdoor furniture. One commonly used plant material is rattan, which comes the rattan palm, traditionally used to make wickerwork furniture. In common usage, the term "rattan" is sometimes used interchangeably with "wicker"; however, rattan is the name of the specific plant-based fiber often used to create the wicker work. Rattan is somewhat elastic and often used to produce baskets, hampers and chairs.

Resin wicker resembles the appearance of woven rattan by design. Polyethylene is the most common resin material used in resin wicker. Synthetic polyethylene fiber resin wicker is generally durable and resistant to stressors such as water damage, sun damage (from UV radiation), and natural decomposition.

== Uses ==
Resin wicker is often used over an aluminum frame to create lightweight outdoor furniture.

== See also ==
- Caning (furniture) – Specific furniture making technique; similar to wicker
- Synthetic fiber – Another synthetic material used in weaving
