= Cane (grass) =

Genera Arundinaria and Arundo

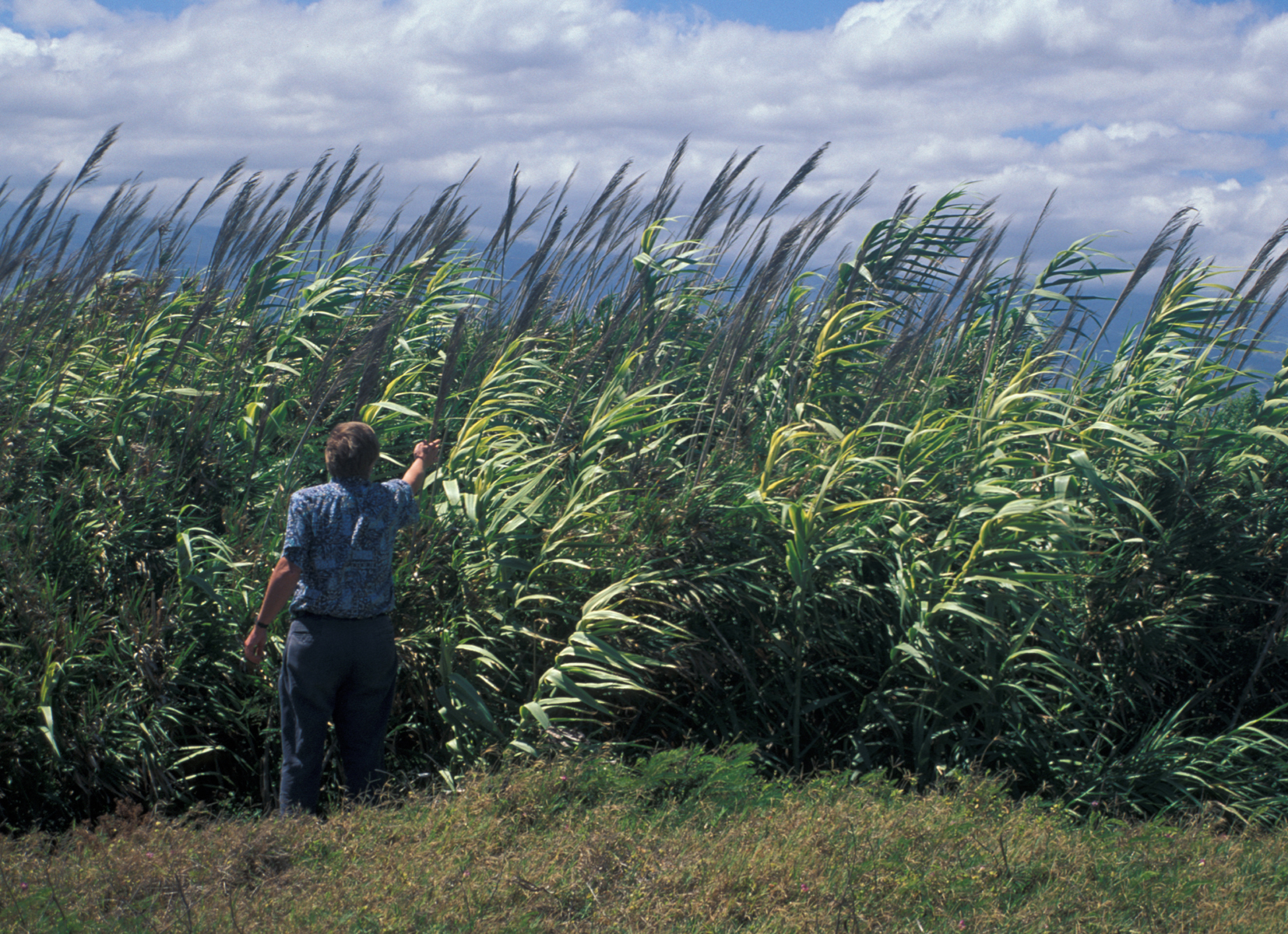
A giant canebrake (Arundo donax)

Cane is any of various tall, perennial grasses with flexible, woody stalks from the genera Arundinaria and Arundo.

Scientifically speaking, they are either of two genera from the family Poaceae. The genus Arundo is native from the Mediterranean Basin to the Far East. The genus Arundinaria is a bamboo (Bambuseae) found in the New World. Neither genus includes sugarcane (genus Saccharum, tribe Andropogoneae).

Cane commonly grows in large riparian stands known as canebrakes, found in toponyms throughout the Southern and Western United States; they are much like the tules (Schoenoplectus acutus) of California.

Depending on strength, cane can be fashioned for various purposes, including walking sticks, crutches, assistive canes, judicial or school canes, baskets, furniture, boats, roofs and wherever stiff, withy sticks can be put to good use.

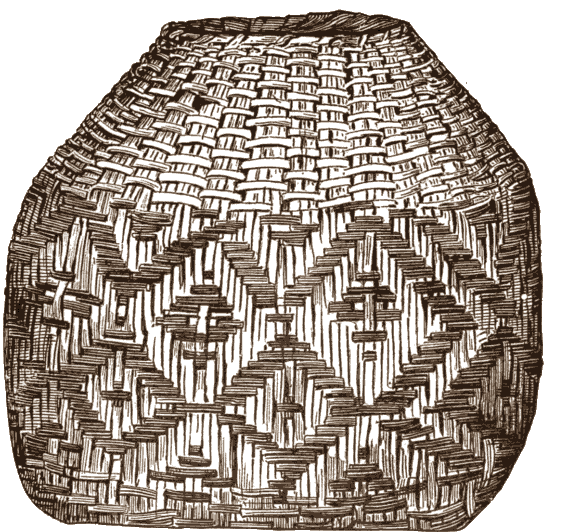
A Cherokee river cane basket

== Etymology ==
The English word cane derives from Old French cane 'sugarcane', from Latin canna, from Ancient Greek κάννα, from Official Aramaic qanhā, qanyā and from Akkadian qanû 'tube, reed'.

== Other uses ==
Cane is used for a variety of artistic and practical purposes, such as Native American baskets of North America. During the 18th and early 19th century, non-commissioned officers in some European armies could carry canes to discipline troops (when not in use, the cane was hooked to a cross-belt or a button). Cane is used to describe furniture made of wicker.

== See also ==
- Caneworking
- Caning (furniture)
