= Closeout (sale) =

Discount sale of inventory

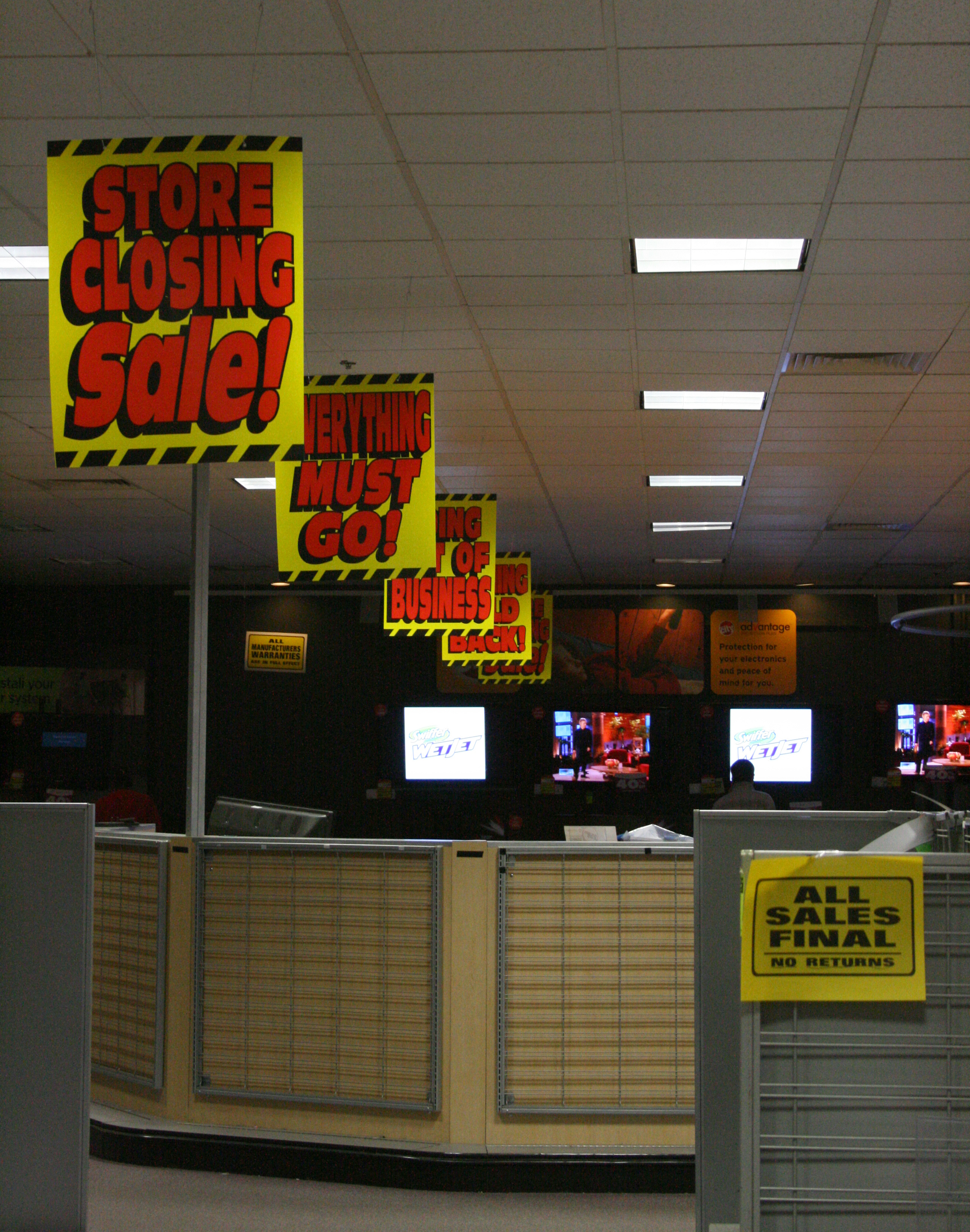
Liquidation sale at Circuit City in Raleigh, North Carolina, United States, in February 2009

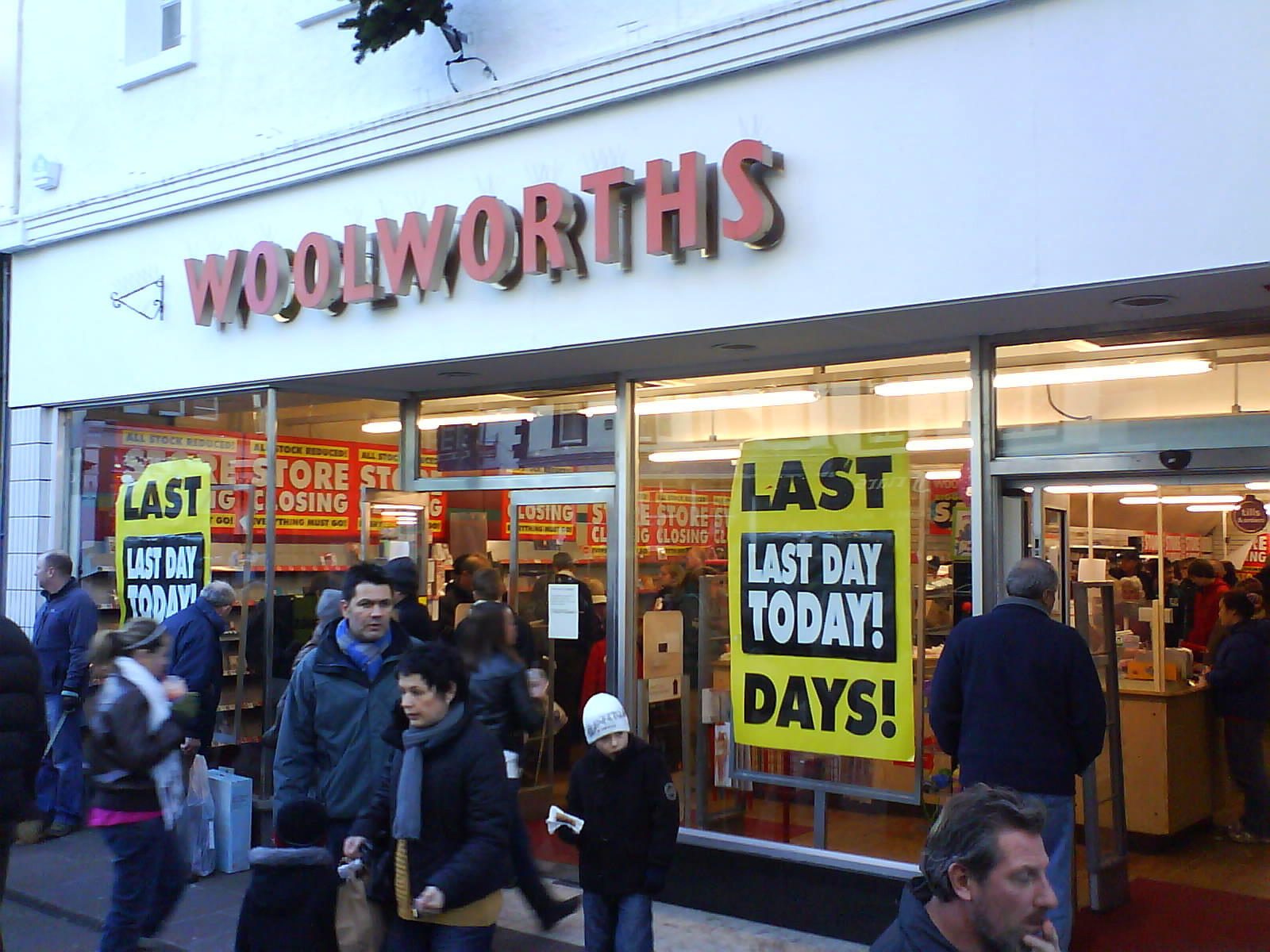
Woolworths in Keswick, Cumbria, England on its final day of trading in December 2008

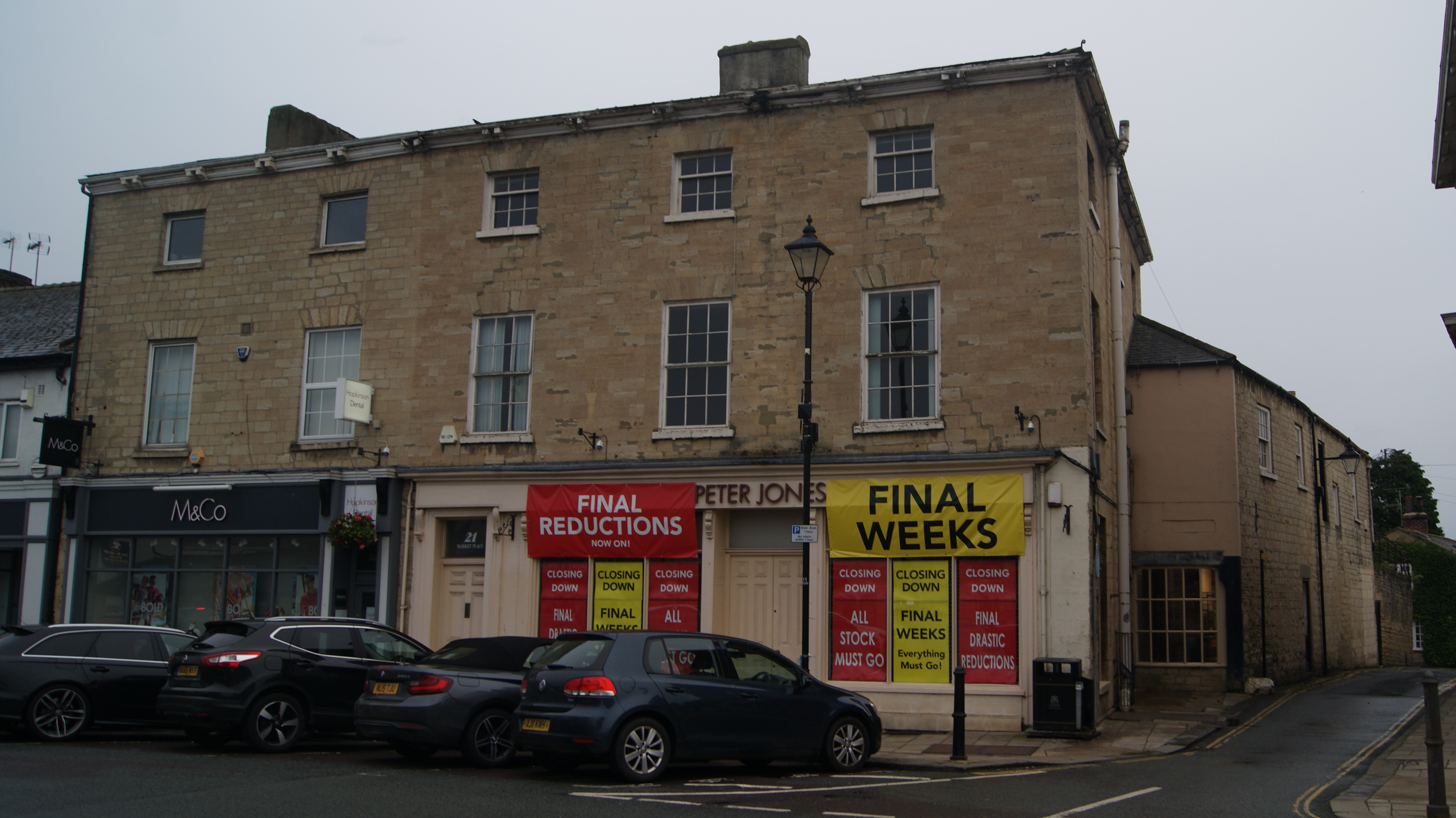
A closing down sale in Wetherby, England

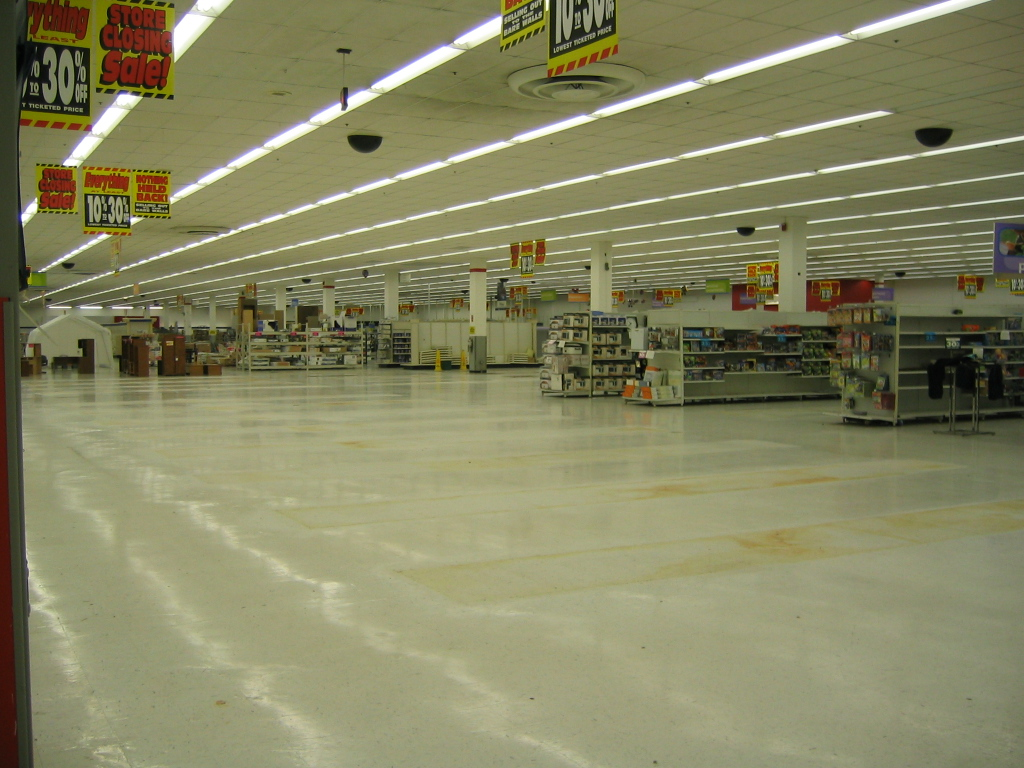
This Kmart closeout to "bare walls" includes the racks and shelves as well as the merchandise.

A closeout or clearance sale (also called a closing down sale in the United Kingdom) is a discount sale of inventory either by retail or wholesale. It may be that a product is not selling well, or that the retailer is closing because of relocation, a fire (a fire sale), over-ordering, or especially because of bankruptcy. In the latter case, it is usually known as a going-out-of-business sale or liquidation sale, and is part of the process of liquidation. A hail sale is a closeout at a car dealership after hail damage.

A store that is closing will often advertise to customers their last chance to buy. However, closures are often from companies that cannot sell their inventory, inventors whose ideas were not marketable, and businesses needing fast-incoming cashflow to pay debts such as payroll or rent.

A closeout store is a retailer specializing in buying closeout items wholesale from others and selling them at low prices. Big Lots is a well-known closeout retail chain in the United States, but other stores such as TJ Maxx, Ross Dress For Less, Marshalls, and Value City are also common and specialize more in clothing and housewares.

== Limitations ==
Some clearance merchandise is non-returnable at some stores, as the intent is to get rid of the items. This is especially the case with liquidation and store-closing sales. However, in many jurisdictions such as the United Kingdom and the European Union, consumers retain their usual rights during a sale, such as the right to return faulty goods (under the Sale of Goods Act 1979 in the UK and Directive (EU) 2019/771 in the EU) and the right to return goods granted by the Distance Selling Regulations in the UK and Directive 2011/83/EU in the EU.

Rather than storing merchandise until the following year, almost every U.S. store also has clearance sales around national holidays, sometimes starting even before the holiday (especially at Christmas and Halloween). Early discounts are often around 25%, but can be as much as 50%, particularly if prices were increased before the holiday. 50% is common just after the holiday, often followed by 75%, and sometimes even 90%. These may be advertised as "everything Santa Claus forgot". Particularly in Canada and the United Kingdom, Boxing Day sales draw large crowds of shoppers seeking after-Christmas deals.

Some customers take note of when specific retailers normally mark down merchandise further, showing up at the store on the very first day for the best selection. Seasonal merchandise (such as winter clothing or summer patio furniture) is also put on clearance to make space for new seasonal stock.

There are also issues where liquidators may force merchandise from another store or even a mail-order retailer onto the store floor, which was never sold by that store originally. Many sales coordinated with outside liquidators can start with store inventory marked up to the full list price rather than the retailer's regular price, thus asserting a false 'bargain' to the customer. Often, certain inventory which would be considered a true bargain in a closeout, such as video game consoles, games and first-party accessories are contractually disallowed from any sort of closeout discount by manufacturers and are often taken back for sale elsewhere at their intended prices.

Some thrift stores have "rolling" closeouts. In this case, all merchandise put out in a given week is given a colored tag, or a letter to indicate what color if the item is directly marked with a grease pencil. During the last week before the color is used again, everything marked in that color is discounted, usually by 50%. At the end of the week, all remaining items with that tag color will be removed from the shelves. There are typically four colors, so that all merchandise is rotated every month or so. Some independent stores use similar systems.

Clearance sales typically occur on marked racks in brick-and-mortar stores. Stores typically place merchandise on a "clearance rack" and periodically reduce the price until someone buys it, as in a Dutch auction. This process has been replicated on the internet. The defunct drop.com (not to be confused with the current retailer of the same name and domain) was the first clearance website to mimic a retail store clearance rack by allowing sellers to automatically mark down their items to a pool of consumers.

== See also ==
- High-low pricing
