= High Low =

High Low may refer to:

- High-low split, a poker variation
- High Low (2015 / 2026) John Frusciante / Trickfinger album
- High-Low (game show), a 1957 American game show
- High–low pricing, a type of pricing strategy
- High/Low (album), a 1996 album by Nada Surf
- High–low system, a design for artillery shells and grenade-launcher ammunition
- High Low, an album by Nathan Wiley
- "High Low", a song by The Unlikely Candidates
- High Low, a hill in the English parish of Highlow

== See also ==
- Hi-Lo (disambiguation)
