= Hi-Lo =

Hi-Lo may refer to:

== Vehicles ==
- A regional term for a forklift, an industrial truck used to lift and move materials short distances
- Hi-Lo, a brand of travel trailer whose upper half rolls down over its lower half to reduce wind resistance during travel

== Card games ==
- High-low split, a poker variant
- Hi-Lo, a type of card counting
- Hi-Lo (High Low), a card game where players guess if a certain face-up card is higher or lower in value than a certain face-down card

== Entertainment ==
- Hi-Lo, a 2000 album by Irish rock band The Walls
- HI-LO, an alias of the Dutch producer Oliver Heldens
- "Hi-Lo", song by Evanescence from the album Synthesis
- "Hi Lo" (The Price Is Right), a pricing game on the American game show The Price Is Right
- The Hi-Lo's, an American singing group formed in 1953
- HiLo, an album by American singer/songwriter Jack Stauber

== Other ==
- Hi-lo, a type of hemline
- Hi/Lo algorithm a database key generation algorithm
- Hi-Lo or High Low, a type of siren signal.

== See also ==
- Hilo (disambiguation)
- High Low (disambiguation)
