= Everyday low price =

Pricing strategy

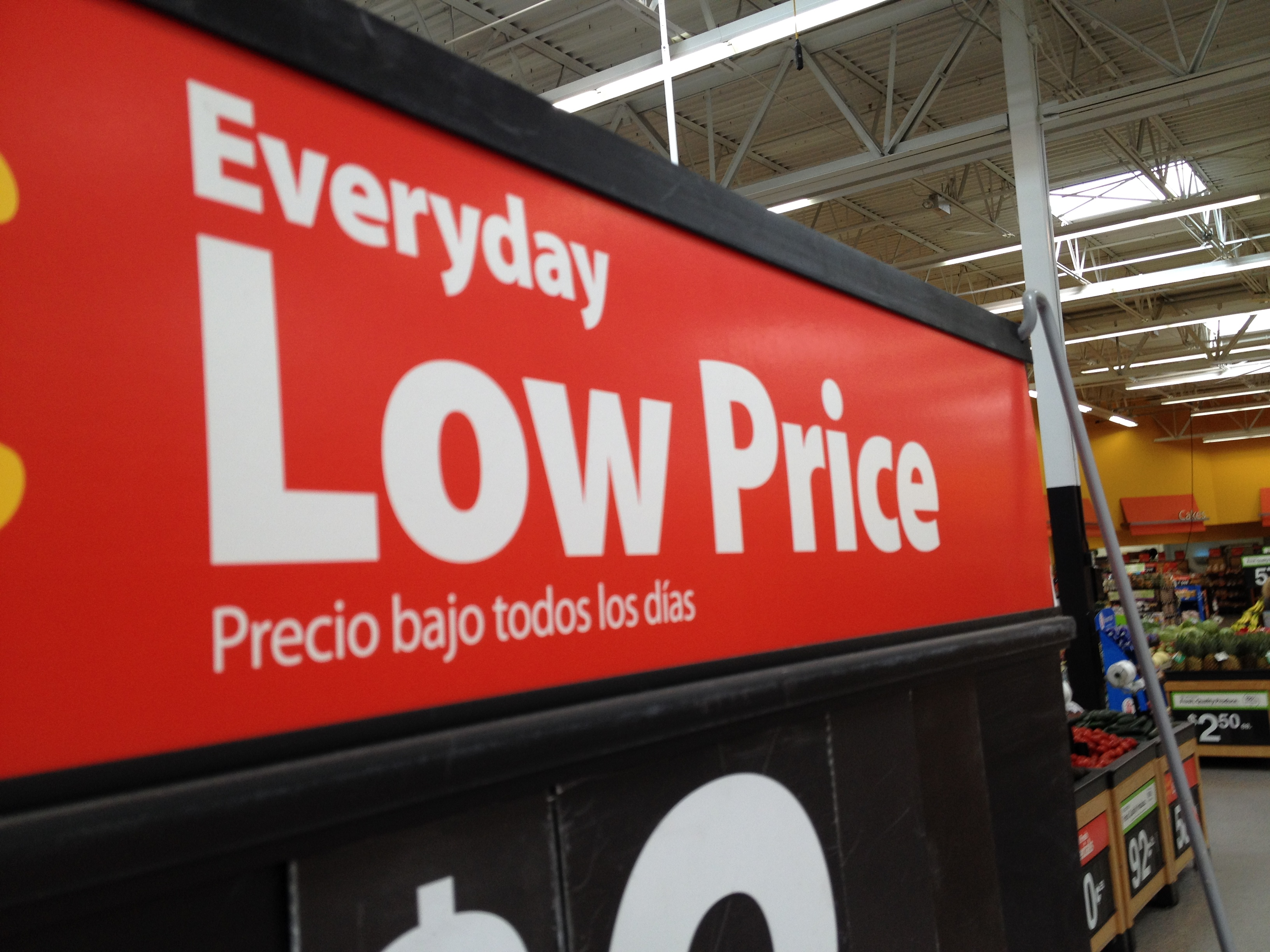
Example of an "Everyday Low Price" advertisement at Walmart

Everyday low price (also abbreviated as EDLP) is a pricing strategy promising consumers a low price without the need to wait for sale price events or comparison shopping. EDLP saves retail stores the effort and expense needed to mark down prices in the store during sale events, and is also believed to generate shopper loyalty. It was noted in 1994 that the Walmart retail chain in the United States, which follows an EDLP strategy, would buy "feature advertisements" in newspapers on a monthly basis, while its competitors would advertise weekly. Other firms that have implemented or promoted EDLP are Procter & Gamble, Food Lion, Gordmans and Winn-Dixie.

== Studies ==
One 1992 study stated that 26% of American supermarket retailers pursued some form of EDLP, meaning that the other 74% promoted high-low pricing strategies.

A 1994 study of an 86-store supermarket grocery chain in the United States concluded that a 10% EDLP price decrease in a category increased sales volume by 3%, while a 10% high-low price increase led to a 3% sales decrease. Because consumer demand at the supermarket did not respond much to changes in everyday price, an EDLP policy reduced profits by 18%, while high-low pricing increased profits by 15%.

A 2011 Stanford Business School study compared EDLP with promotional pricing and found that EDLP lowered fixed costs but promotional pricing was a preferable strategy because it generated more revenue for the supermarket chains covered by the study.

== Concept ==
The price set by an EDLP retailer is typically within the range of a high-low retailer's discounted price and its non-discounted price.

It is common for competing retailers to segment the market by choosing different pricing strategies. The segments consist of two different sets of customers with different buying patterns, both for purchases and for pre-purchase research. Price-vigilant consumers, often referred to as "cherry pickers", tend to be attracted to discounts. They are willing to do the research to learn about discounts, and to stockpile products when discounts exist. These consumers are better reached by promotional pricing strategies. In contrast, "expected price shoppers" are unwilling to do as much pre-purchase research and less likely to stockpile discounted items.

EDLP strategies generally result in lower fixed costs, since they require less advertising for promotional prices, less labor to execute price changes, and simpler pricing and inventory management systems with lower overhead. EDLP can also result in more predictable consumer demand and therefore fewer stocking and supply-chain problems. High-low pricing strategies generally result in lower variable costs, since promotional retailers can sell more products by offering discounts. They are able to take advantage of surplus at the wholesale level and also eliminate excess inventory at the retail level. This is particularly useful in markets for perishable goods, such as groceries.

If the market is sharply segmented by cherry pickers and expected price shoppers, then EDLP retailers have no incentive to switch to high-low pricing strategies, and vice versa. However, there are circumstances which motivate some retailers to change. In the last several decades, consumers have been less able and less willing to spend time reading circulars and newspaper ads to find the best prices.

Retailers lose more in case of price decrease than gain on price increase. Price variation in high-low pricing strategies may benefit shoppers who visit stores frequently because they are better able to exploit the fluctuating prices; however, many consumers are shopping less frequently now than in previous decades. These buying trends would predict that many grocers would switch from high-low pricing to EDLP, if the cost to switch was minimal. However, total costs for EDLP are higher in many markets, and it is extremely expensive for retailers to switch strategies. Not only is the initial cost high, but the EDLP strategy must be maintained long enough for consumers to associate lower prices with the brand.

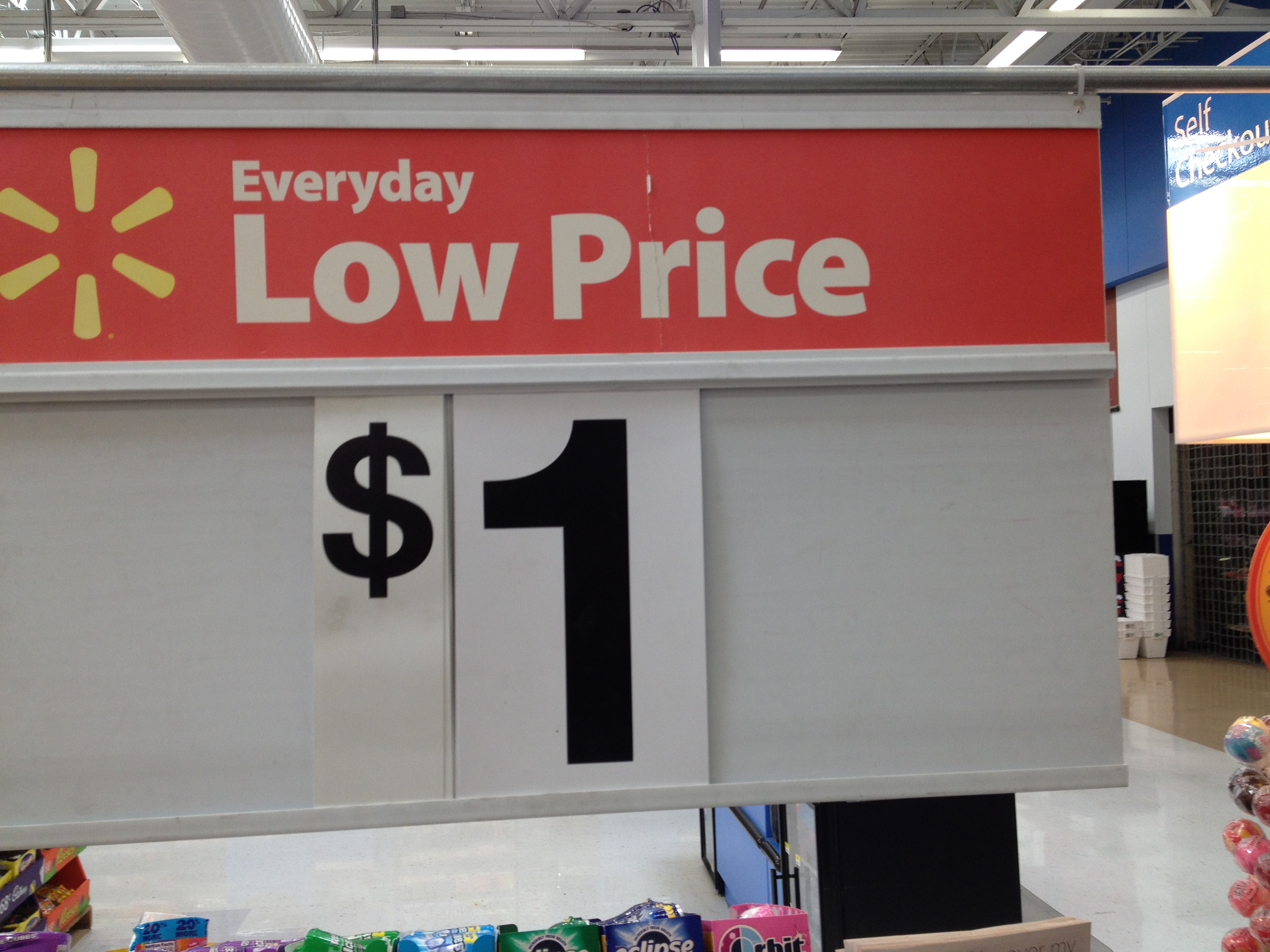
Example of an "Everyday Low Price" advertisement at Walmart

In North America, Walmart is widely associated with EDLP, since it incorporated the concept into its slogan. Walmart opened its first store in 1962 in a market where Kmart had been the dominant player using a high-low pricing strategy. Kmart's signature "blue light special" is an example of in-store advertising used to promote a temporary discount as part of the high-low pricing strategy. Walmart's success in EDLP and the decline of other retailers have followed the long-term trend in this market and in consumer buying habits. The growth of Walmart Supercenters in the 1990s was expected to drive the same trend in grocery stores. Despite Walmart's success with the Supercenter concept, high-low pricing has not been entirely replaced by EDLP in the grocery market.

In many markets, high-low pricing results in higher revenues. This is largely connected to the psychology associated with sale-shopping. While consumers state in surveys that they prefer the convenience and savings of EDLP, they actually tend to purchase more when high-low pricing strategies are employed. Some EDLP retailers believe that the EDLP strategy mitigates the risk of consumer discontent when products that they have purchased later drop in price. However, this effect does not appear significant enough to modify consumer behavior.

== See also ==
- Discount store
