= Garden furniture =

Furniture designed for outdoor use

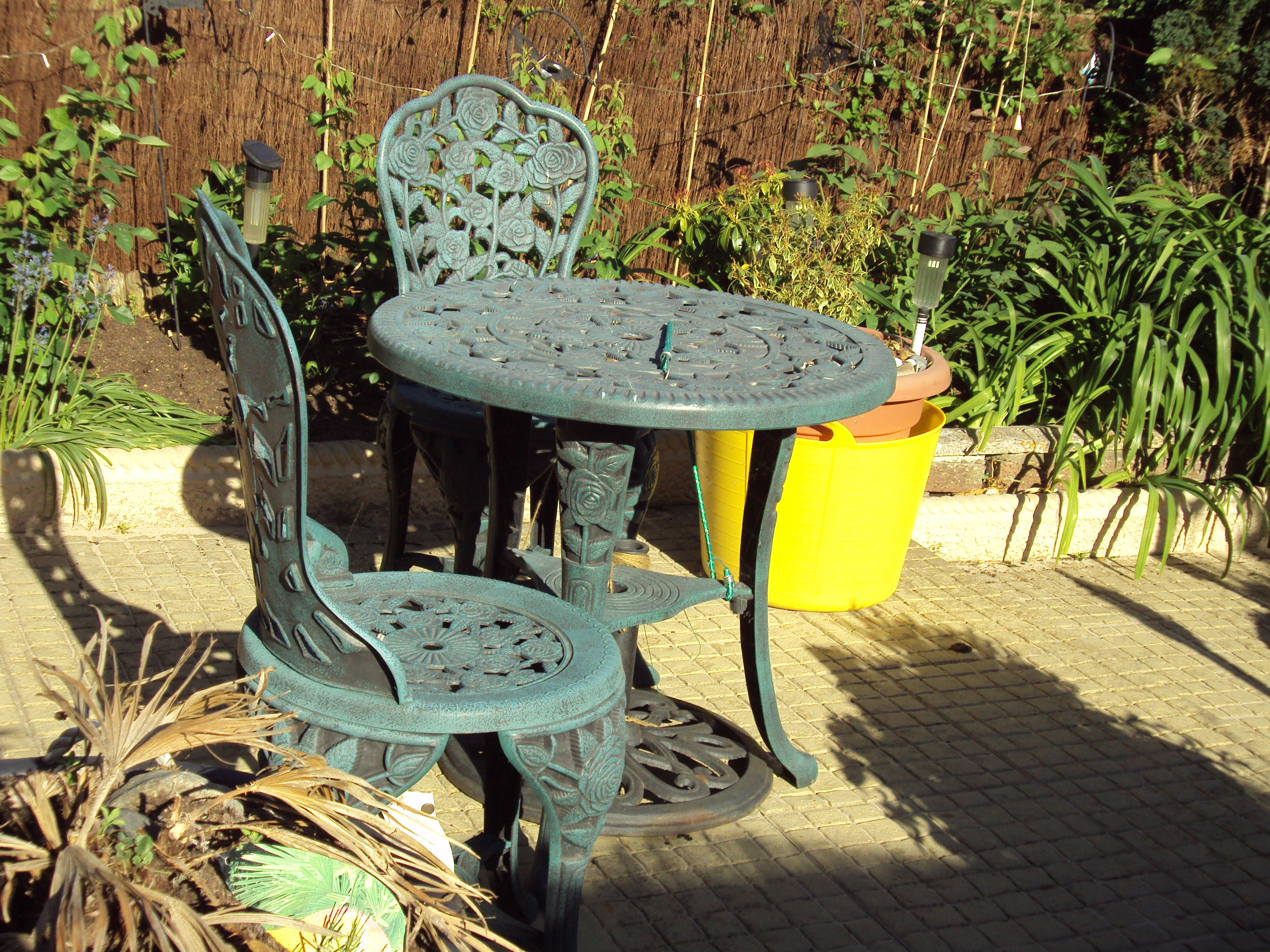
Garden chairs and table, England

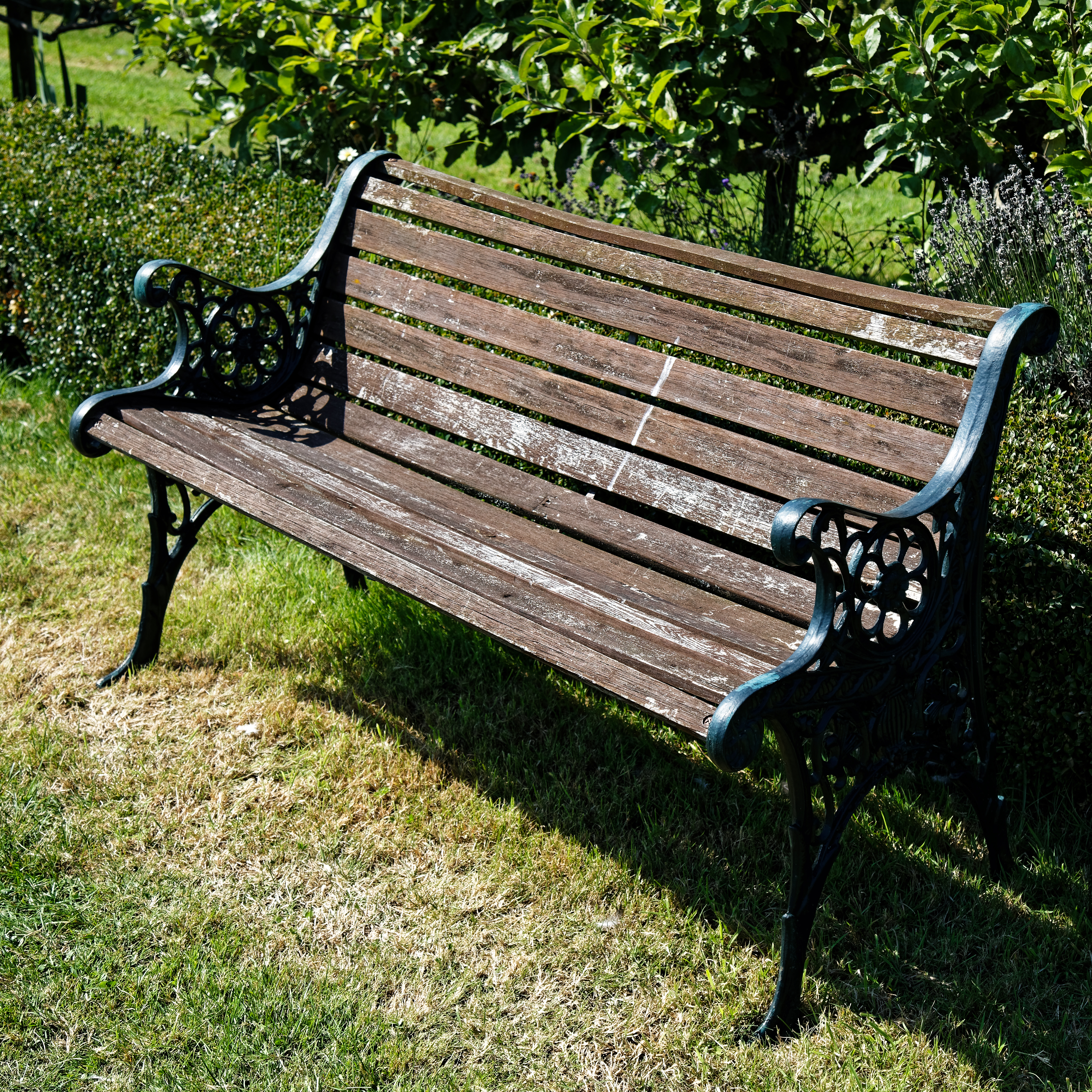
A bench in a public park

Garden furniture, also called patio furniture or outdoor furniture, is a type of furniture specifically designed for outdoor use. It is typically made of weather-resistant materials such as aluminium, which is rust-proof.

== History ==
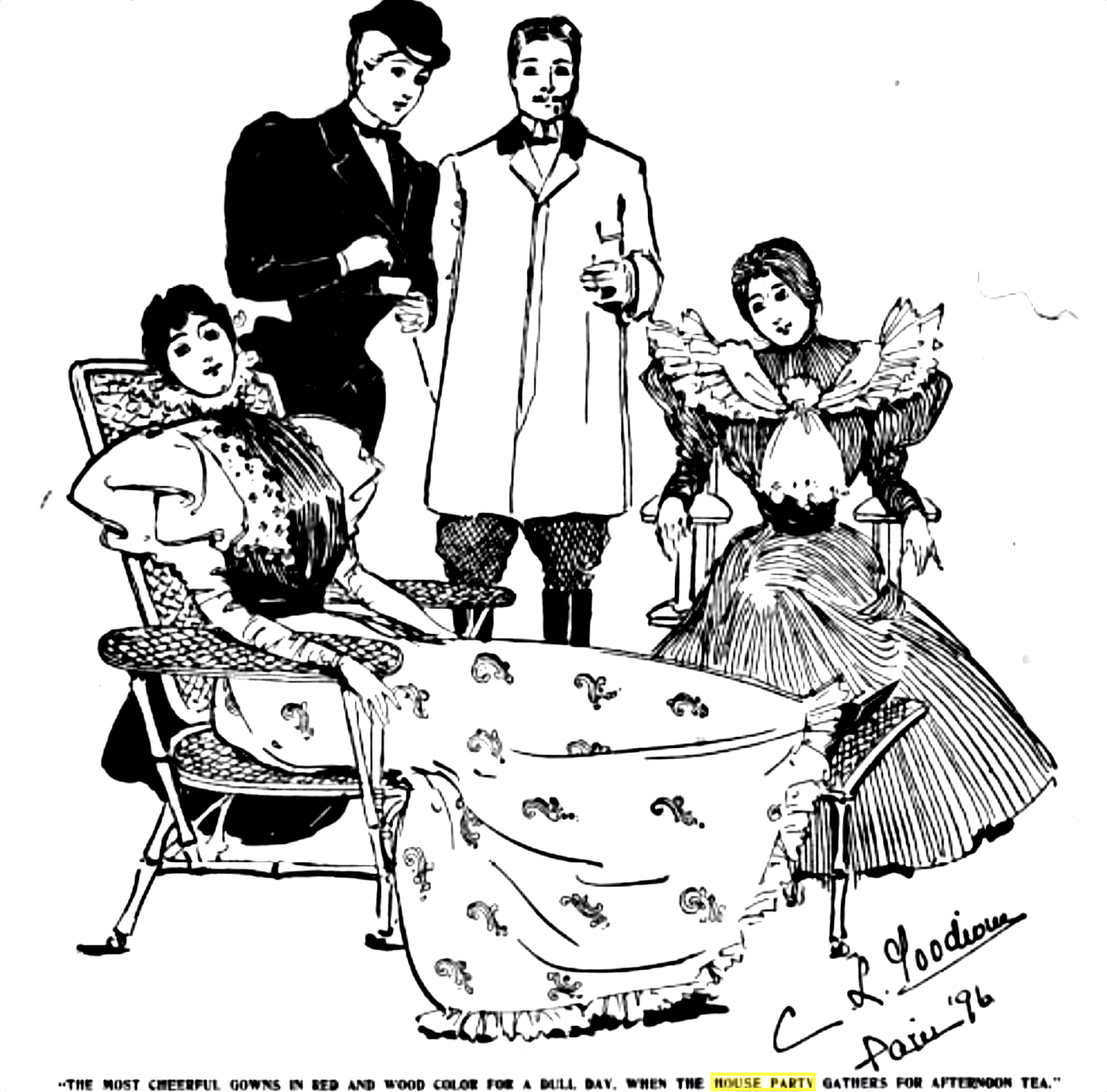
Sketch from the St. Louis Daily Globe-Democrat, September 27, 1896. Women relax in garden furniture.

The oldest surviving examples of garden furniture were found in the gardens of Pompeii. Around 1840, Janes, Beebe & Co. produced one of the earliest products of mass-produced cast-iron seating manufacture in America.

== Types of furniture ==
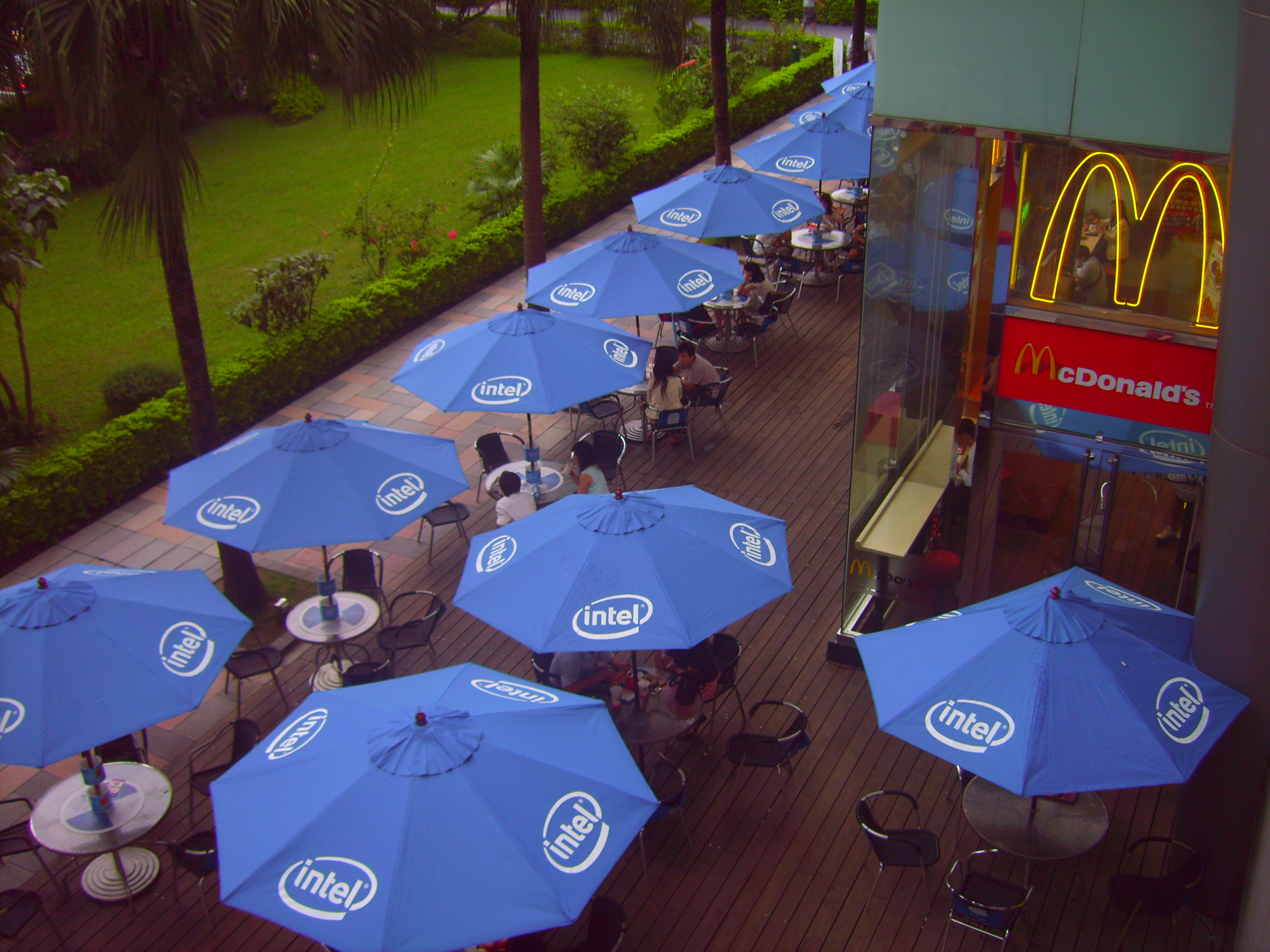
An area of typical patio furniture, including umbrellas, in Taiwan, 2007

- Wooden furniture
- Bamboo furniture
- Wicker or rattan furniture
- Metal furniture
- Plastic furniture
- Glass furniture
- Rope furniture
- Synthetic fiber furniture

=== Seating ===
Garden furniture is often sold as a patio set consisting of a table, four or six chairs, and a parasol. A picnic table is used for the purpose of eating a meal outdoors. Long chairs, referred to as chaise longue, are also common items. The Adirondack chair is also a popular choice.

=== Temperature control ===
The British 'garden parasol' or American 'garden umbrella' is the term for a specialised type of umbrella designed to provide shade from the sun. Parasols are either secured in a weighted base or a built-in mount in the paving. Some are movable around outdoor tables and seating, others centred through a hole mid-table.

Patio heaters are used to enable people to sit outside at night or in cold weather. They can be permanently mounted on eaves and patio roofs, or portable and self-supporting. They can operate on electricity, propane, bottled butane (small units), or natural gas. The latter can be plumbed into permanent locations or attached to 'quick-connect' outlets.

Modular outdoor fire pits and portable fire bowls have become widely available in many materials to extend outdoor living. The tall clay Chimeneas of North America are an example.

=== Accessories ===
Garden accessories include items like birdbaths, plant stands, planter boxes and trellises to add detail to an outdoor space.

== Materials ==
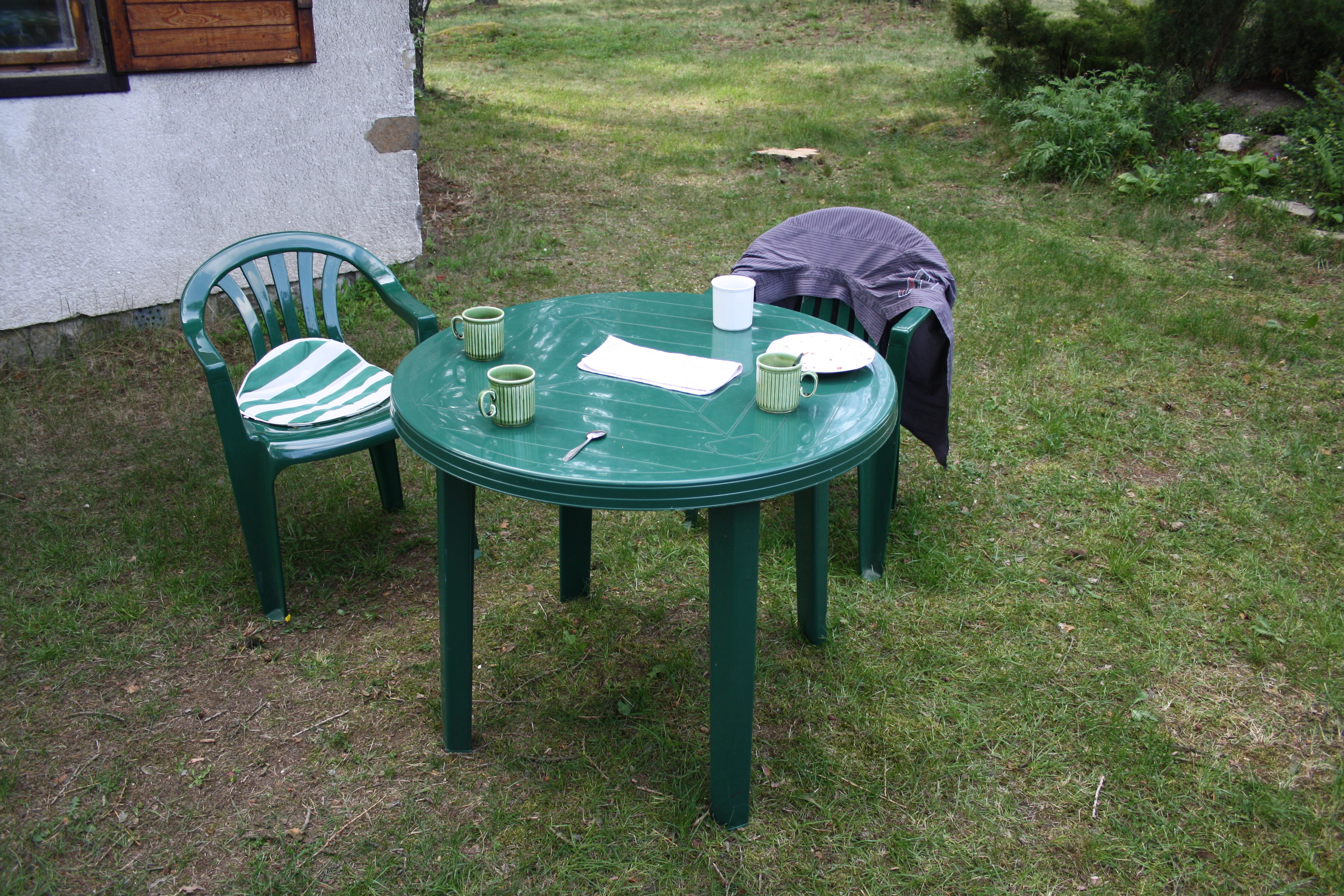
Green plastic garden furniture, Czech Republic, 2009

The most commonly sold types of patio sets are made of plastic, wood, aluminium, wicker, and wrought iron.

Wooden garden furniture can suffer through exposure to the elements and therefore needs to be periodically treated. Teak is a commonly used material for outdoor furniture. It naturally contains silica, which makes it resistant to fungal decay, many of the effects of water (such as rot, swelling and warping), as well as chemicals. It is also resistant to fire, acid and alkalis.

Wicker outdoor living furniture was originally made from the stems of any one of 600 species of palms predominantly found in the tropical forests of Southeast Asia. These vine-like palms, belonging to the subfamily Calamoideae, were harvested for their pliable yet sturdy stems, which were then tightly woven into interlocking panels to form various furniture pieces. The palm stems were tightly woven into interlocking panels, and formed into the desired structure. Modern wicker furniture is often made from synthetic resin or other plastic which is moulded to resemble real wood or wicker.

== See also ==
- Courtyard
- Deck (building)
- Garden design
- Resin wicker
