= The HiLo Club =

Bar and nightclub in Oklahoma, USA

Coordinates: 35°31′21″N 97°31′58″W

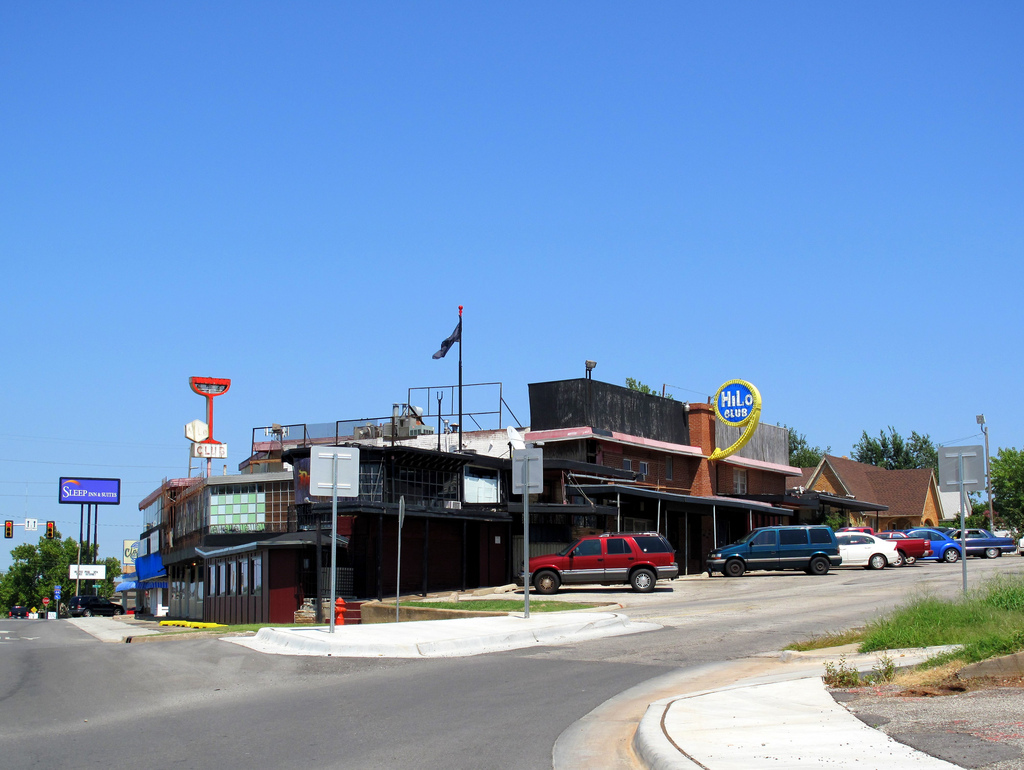

The HiLo Club (also Hilo or Hi-Lo), was a bar and nightclub in Oklahoma City. It was established in 1956 as a private establishment that provided music and drinks to thirsty Okies during its long prohibition struggle until its full repeal which legalized liquor by the drink in Oklahoma in 1985. As liquor by the drink was legalized the "club" became a hub for the homosexual community of the 1980s.

According to Bob Blackburn, the executive director of the Oklahoma Historical Society, bootlegging was part of Oklahoma culture and the readiness of alcohol became one of the reasons it took so long to be repealed. Eventually, without the full repeal of alcohol, "Keeping alcohol from the guys at the packing plants or the oil fields is one thing,” Blackburn said. “But keeping alcohol from the members of the country club or those who are running the banks downtown and suddenly they can’t give alcohol to their buddies in New York City, then suddenly you start getting their attention.”

The building was designed by Matt Donnay and is thought to be one of the first in the Oklahoma City area that consisted of restaurants, residential and retail in the same building. The HiLo Club was one of its first tenants and its future at this location is uncertain as the Donnay Building is as of 2017 under contract to be purchased and demolished by dairy chain Braum's.
