= Caning (furniture) =

Craft of weaving seats for chairs

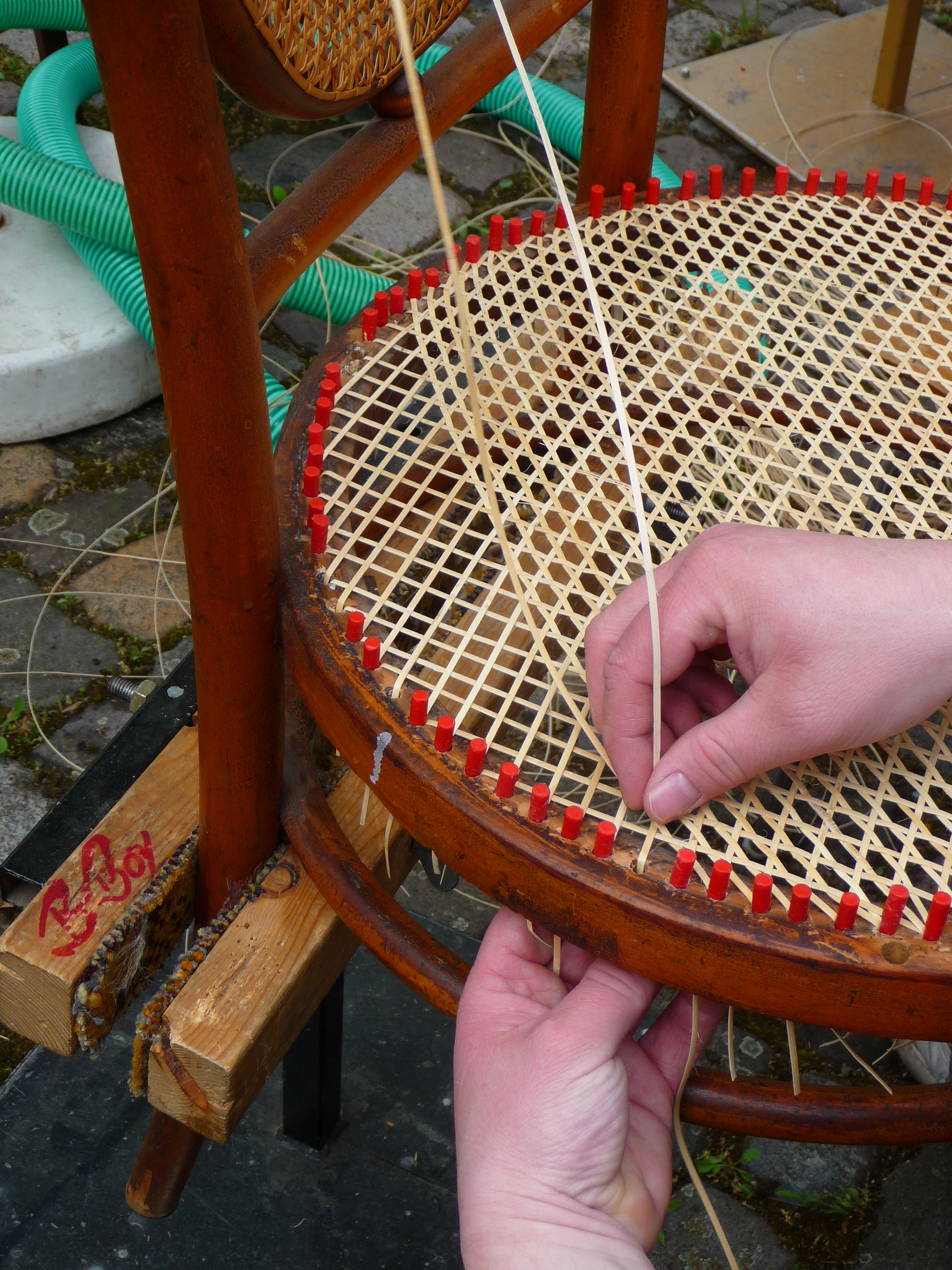
A chair being caned

In the context of furniture, caning is a method of weaving chair seats and other furniture, either while building new chairs or in the process of cane chair repair.

Furniture or chair caning may be confused with wicker; chair caning is specifically the craft of applying rattan cane or rattan peel to a piece of furniture such as the backs or seats of chairs, whereas wicker or wicker work is a reference to the craft of weaving any number of materials such as willow or rattan reeds as well as man-made paper based cords.

== Rattan ==
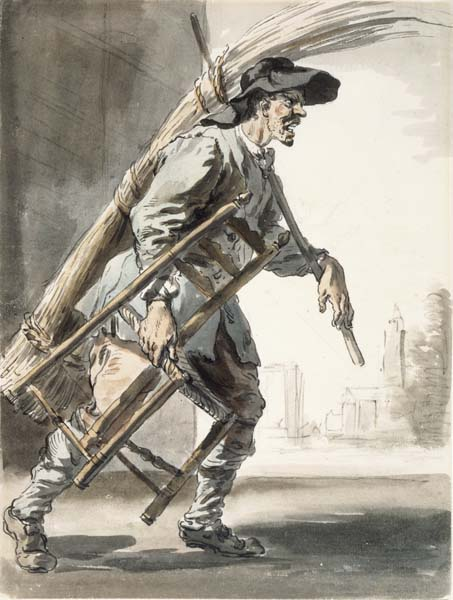
Cane chair weaver, 1759, by Paul Sandby

In common use, the term cane may refer to any plant with a long, thin stem. However, the cane used for furniture is derived from the rattan vine native to Indonesia, the Philippines, and Malaysia. The vines typically grow to 100–300 feet (30–90 m) in length; most have a diameter less than 1 inch (25 mm). Before export, the rattan stems are cut to uniform lengths and the bark is removed in narrow strips of 1/16 to 3/16 inch (2 to 5 mm). Sugar cane and bamboo (sometimes called "cane" in the southern United States) should not be confused with rattan cane.

Rattan vine looks somewhat similar to bamboo but is quite different in that bamboo is hollow and holds itself upright while rattan is a solid flexible vine that needs the support of surrounding structure to elevate itself off the forest floor. It climbs to the top of canopies of the forest to reach sunlight with the help of large rugged thorns that grab hold of surrounding trees. Sometimes much of the length of these rugged vines are draped along the forest floor from tree to tree in search of a suitable structure to climb.
