= Wicker =

Objects made by weaving or plaiting flexible twigs or osiers

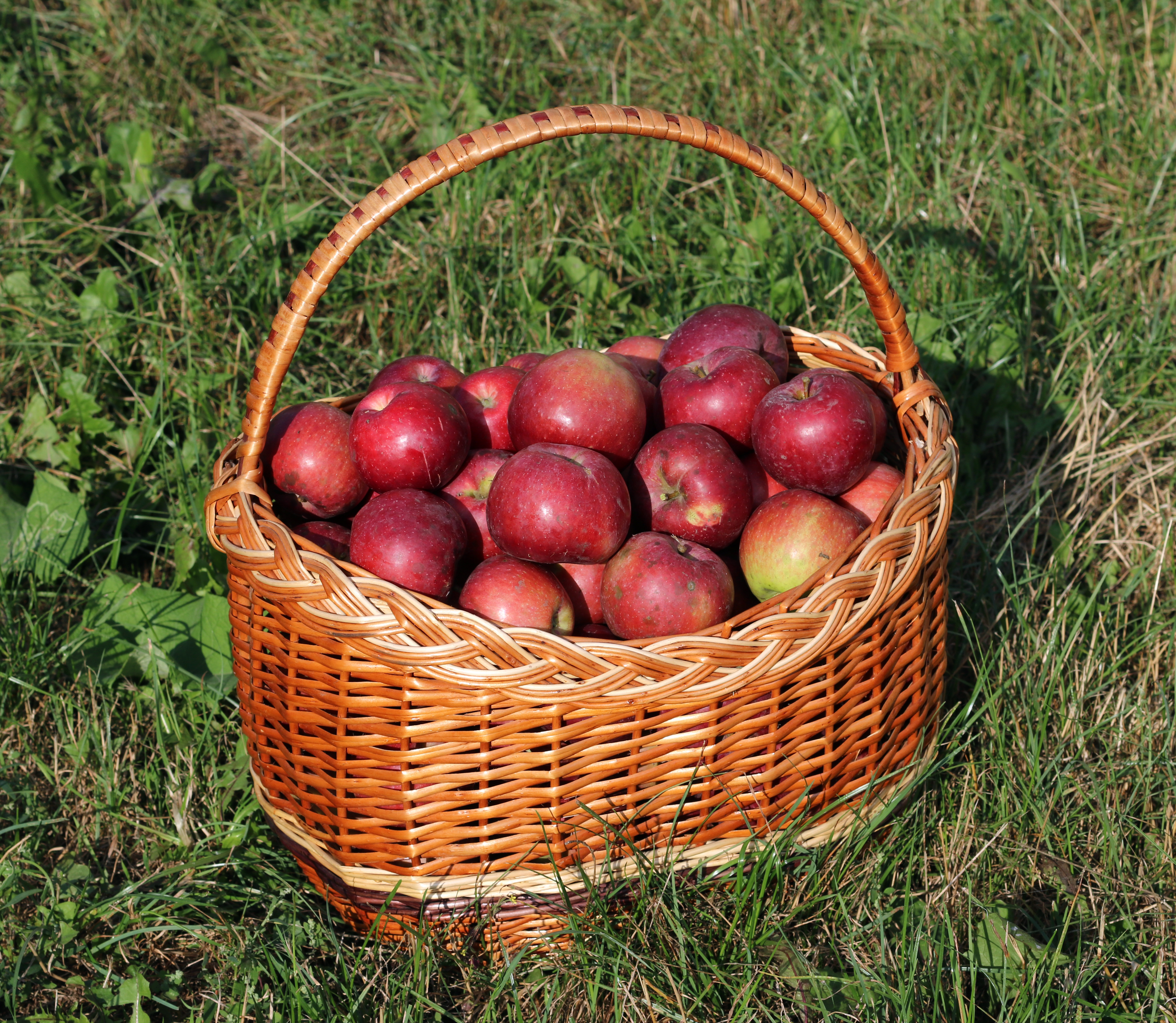
A wicker basket filled with apples

Wicker is a method of weaving used to make products such as furniture and baskets, as well as a descriptor to classify such products. It is the oldest furniture-making method, dating as far back as c. 3000 BC. Wicker was first documented in ancient Egypt, then having been made from pliable plant material, but in modern times it is made from any pliable, easily woven material. The word wicker or "wisker" is believed to be of Scandinavian origin: vika, which means "to fold" in Swedish. Wicker is traditionally made of plant-based material, such as willow, rattan, reed, and bamboo, though the term also applies to products woven from synthetic fibers. Wicker is light yet sturdy, making it suitable for items that will be moved often like porch and patio furniture. Rushwork and wickerwork are terms used in England. A typical braiding pattern is called Wiener Geflecht, Viennese braiding, as it was invented in 18th century Vienna and later most prominently used with the Thonet coffeehouse chair.

== History ==
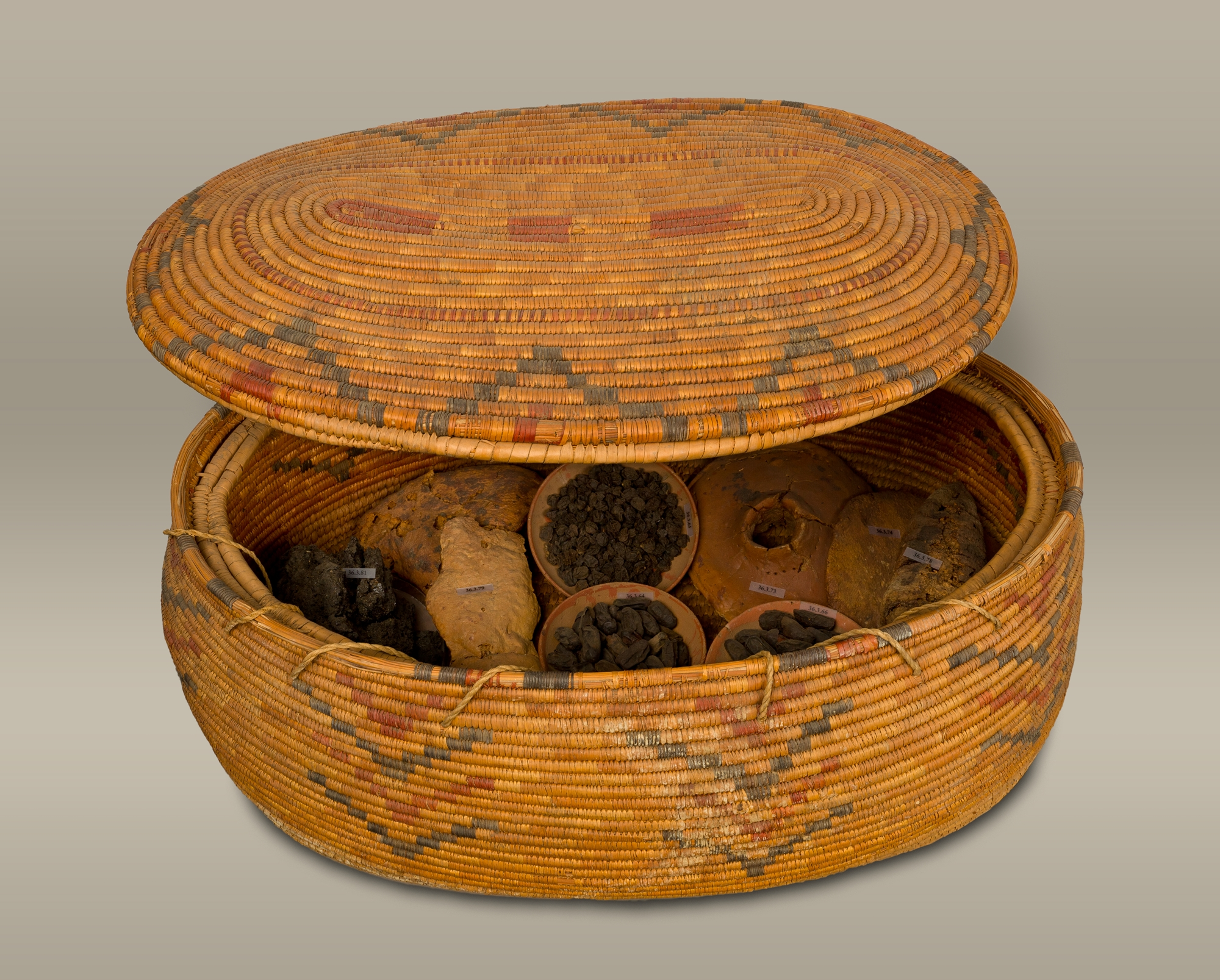
Wicker basket, Egypt, New Kingdom, c. 1492–1473 BC

Wicker has been documented as far back as ancient Egypt, made from indigenous "reed and swamp grasses." Middle-class families could only afford a few pieces, such as small tables. However, archaeologists working on the tombs of the wealthy pharaohs have uncovered a wider variety of wicker items, including "chests, baskets, wig boxes, and chairs". Wicker even found use in the Achaemenid Empire on the battlefield, in shields.

The popularity of wicker passed from ancient Egypt and Persia to ancient Rome. Wicker baskets were used to carry items in Pompeii. Furniture was manufactured out of wicker in the Roman style. It has been proposed that the extensive use of wicker in the Iron Age (1200 BC – 400 AD in Europe) may have influenced the development of the woven patterns used in Celtic art. By the 16th and 17th centuries, wicker was "quite common" in European countries like Portugal, Spain, and England.

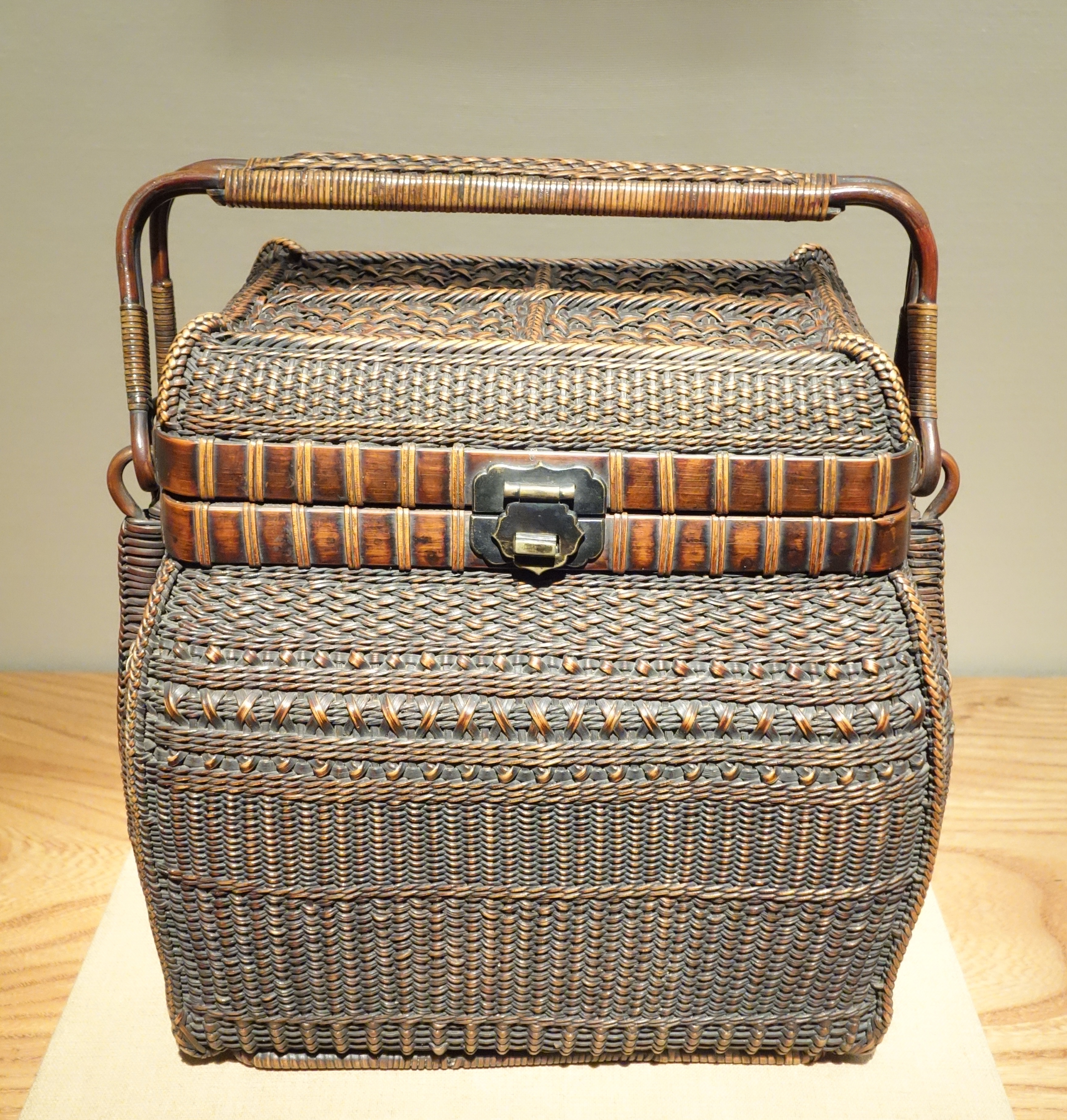
Rattan wicker basket, 1883

Wicker received a boost during the Age of Exploration, when international sea traders returned from Philippines with a species of palm called rattan. Rattan is stronger than traditional European wicker materials, although the rattan stem can be separated so the softer inner core can be used for wicker.

The 19th century brought immense popularity for wicker in Europe, England, and North America. It was used outdoors as well as indoors. People in the Victorian Era believed it to be more sanitary than upholstered furniture. It was inexpensive, resisted harsh weather and was adaptable to many styles.

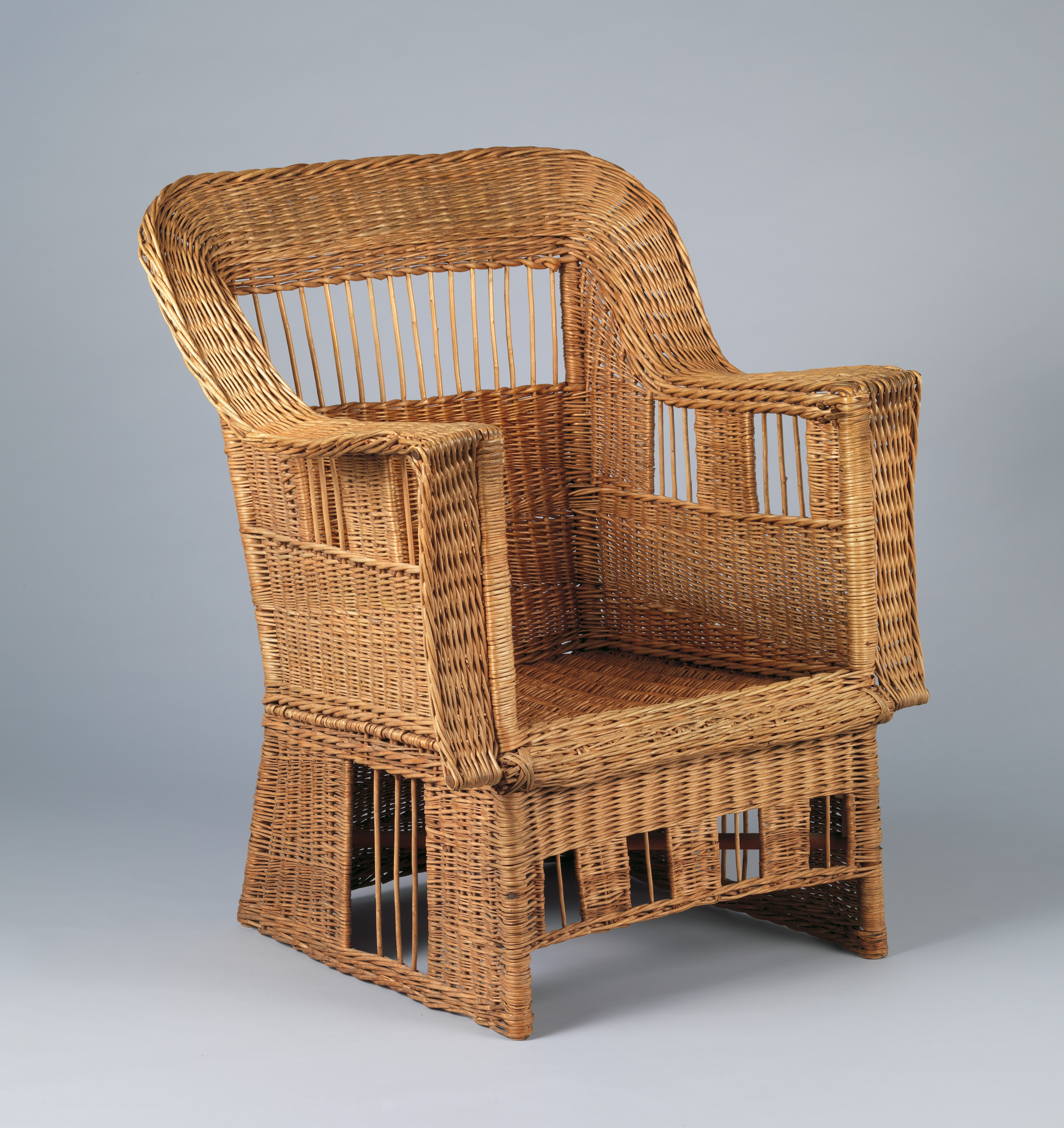
Willow wicker armchair, c. 1907–13

In the United States, Cyrus Wakefield began constructing rattan furniture in the 1850s. He first used rattan that had been offloaded from ships, where it was used as ballast, but as his designs became well-known, he began importing the material himself. Wakefield's company became one of the leading industries in wicker furniture; it later merged with the Heywood Chair Manufacturing Company (a wooden chair company that had invented a mechanical process for weaving wicker seats) to form the Heywood-Wakefield, one of the oldest and most prominent North American wicker manufacturers.

In Italy wicker furniture were presented in 1902 at the first exhibition of modern decorative art held in Turin. Antonio Dal Vera of Conegliano Veneto became the largest industry in the rattan furniture sector in Italy in the 1930s.

In recent times, its aesthetic was influenced heavily by the Arts and Crafts movement at the turn of the 20th century.

Wicker is still a popular material. Antique wicker products are highly sought after by collectors. Reproductions of furniture and accent pieces are also sold for indoor and outdoor use. (In North America today, "rattan" and "wicker" are frequently used interchangeably.) Wickerwork is an important industry in Poland, employing hundreds of skilled workers to create goods for export to western Europe.

Laundry baskets have been and are popular in Europe.

== Manufacture ==
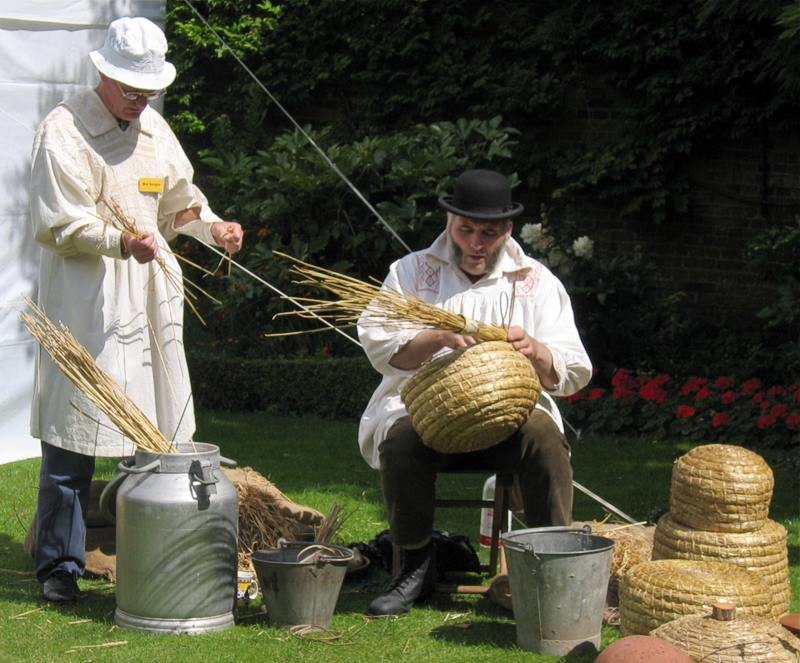
Handmaking a traditional wicker beehive with straw

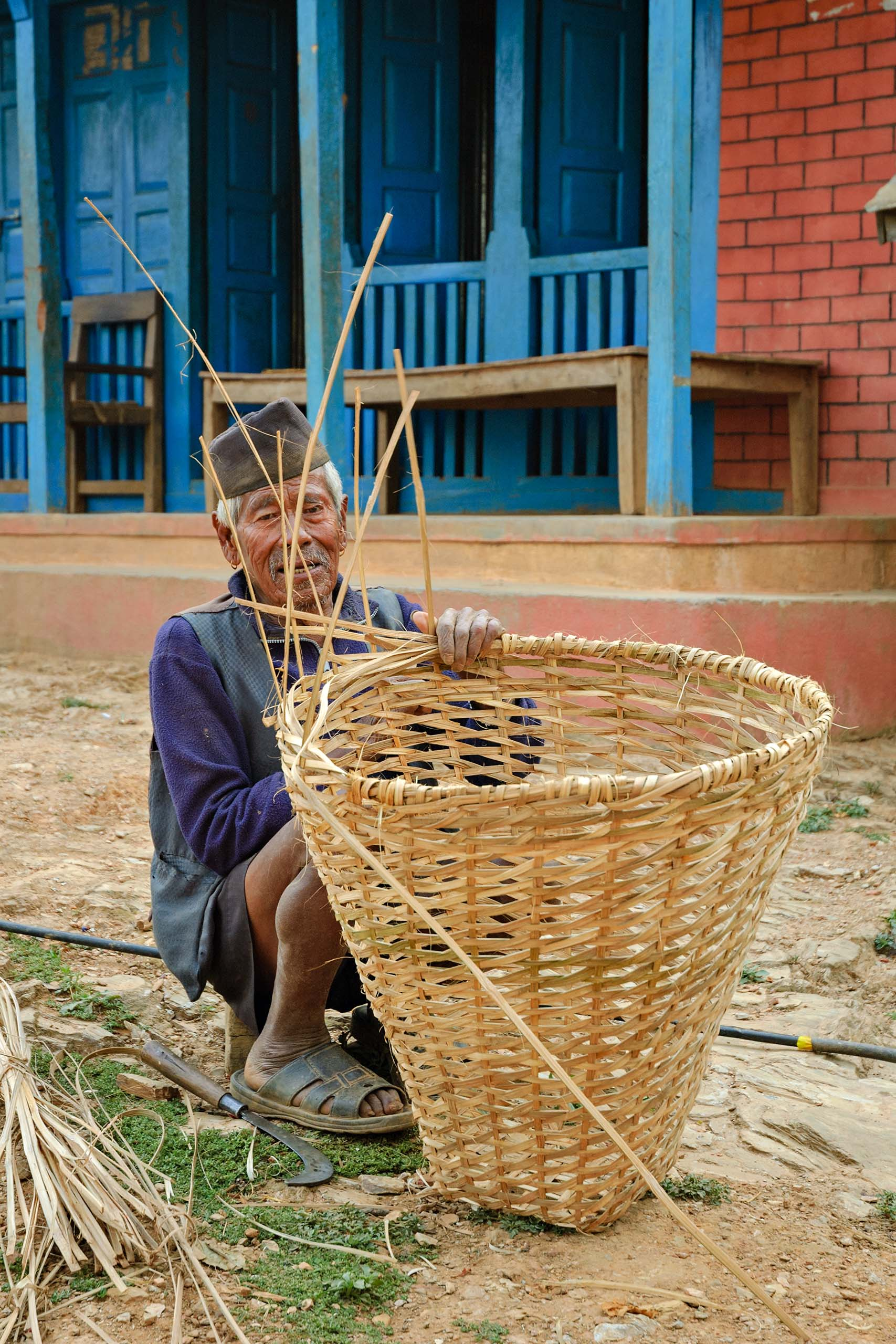
Wicker basket maker at work behind a basket, Dhading, Nepal

Natural wicker is well known for its strength and durability, as well as the high level of beauty and comfort that an expert craftsman can create. Materials used can be any part of a plant, such as the cores of cane or rattan stalks, or whole thicknesses of plants, as with willow switches. Other popular materials include reed and bamboo. Natural wicker requires maintenance to keep it in good shape.

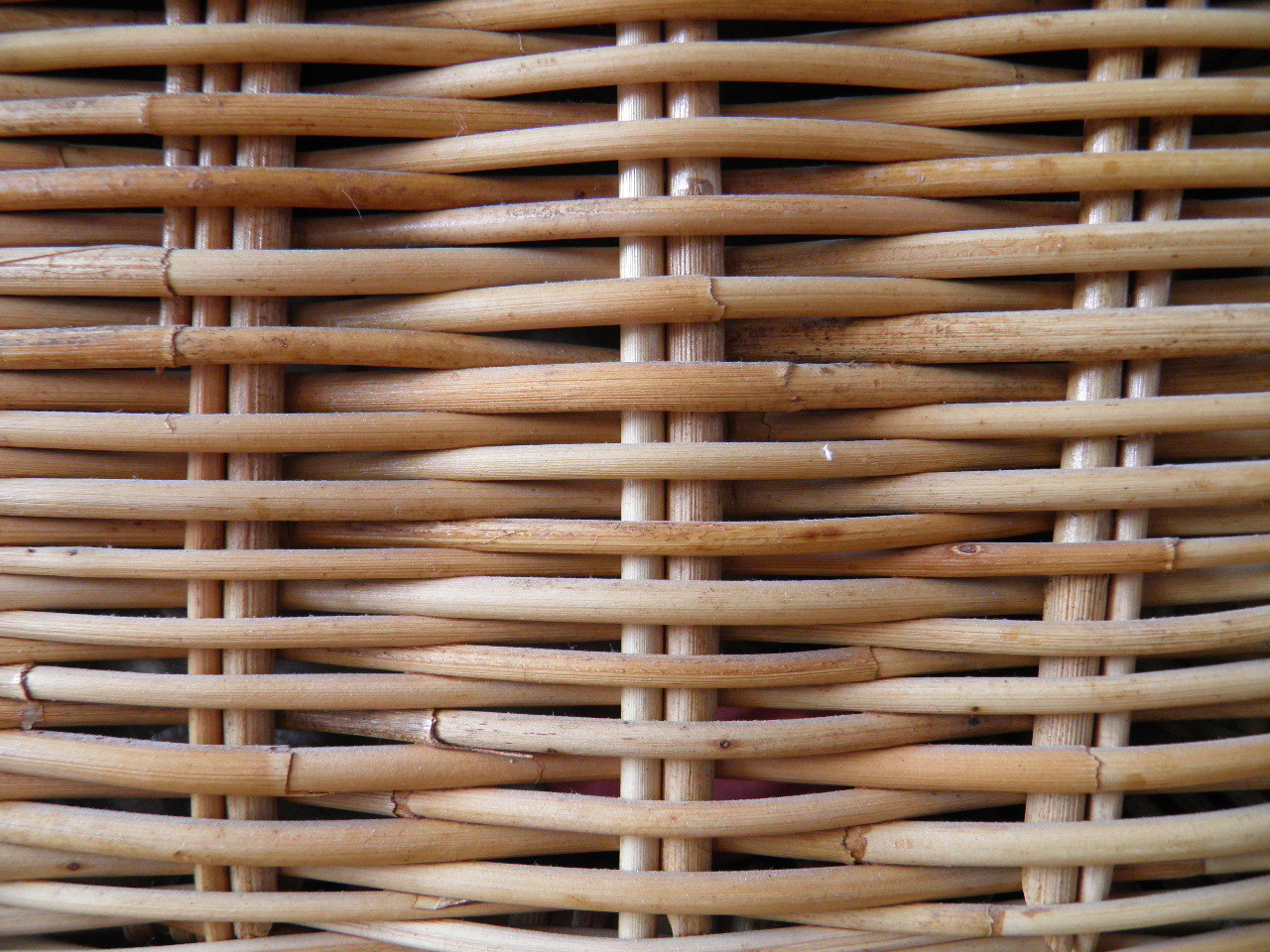
Natural wicker weave

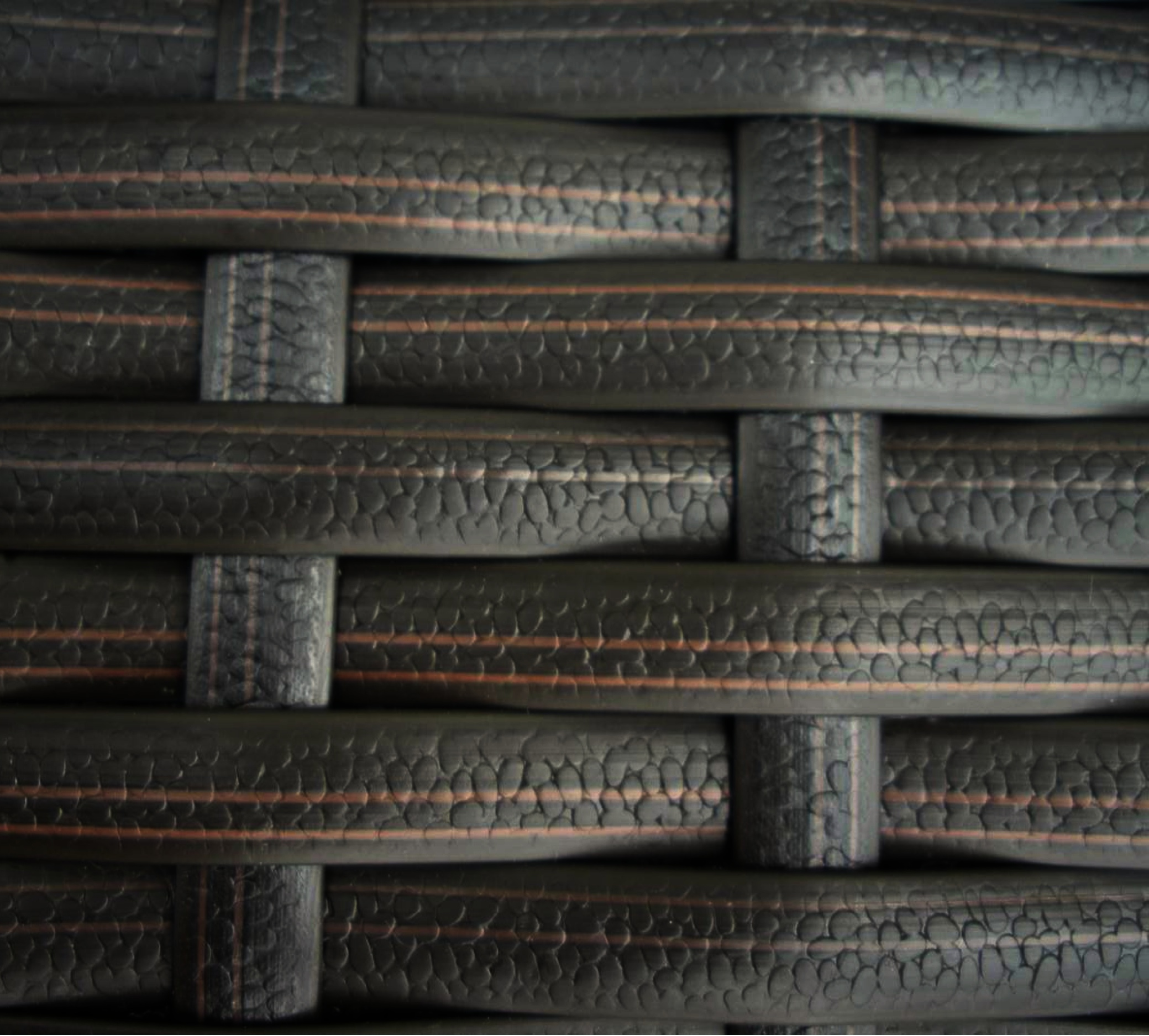
Resin wicker weave

Wicker can also be made from synthetic materials, or a combination. In furniture, such as benches, chairs, stools and other seating devices, a frame is typically made of stiffer materials, after which more pliant material is woven into the frame to fill it. In a smaller piece such as a basket, a strengthening frame is not needed so the entire piece is woven from the wicker material.

Synthetic types include paper-wrapped high tensile wire (using the Lloyd Loom process patented in the early 20th century), and plastic or resin. The synthetic wickers are often preferred for outdoor use ("all-weather wicker"). The frame material used in these more recent versions includes aluminum.

The largest basket vase in the world is located in Germany.

== Etymology ==
The word wicker entered English in the mid-14th century as Middle English wiker, originally referring to wickerwork or basket-work rather than the material itself. It derives from a Scandinavian source, cognate with Middle Swedish viker and Danish viger, meaning "willow" or "willow branch". Linguists trace these words to Proto-Germanic *wik- and ultimately to the Proto-Indo-European root *weik-, meaning "to bend" or "to wind", referring to the flexibility of willow twigs used in weaving. The adjective wicker, meaning "made of wicker", has been recorded since around 1500.

== Image gallery ==
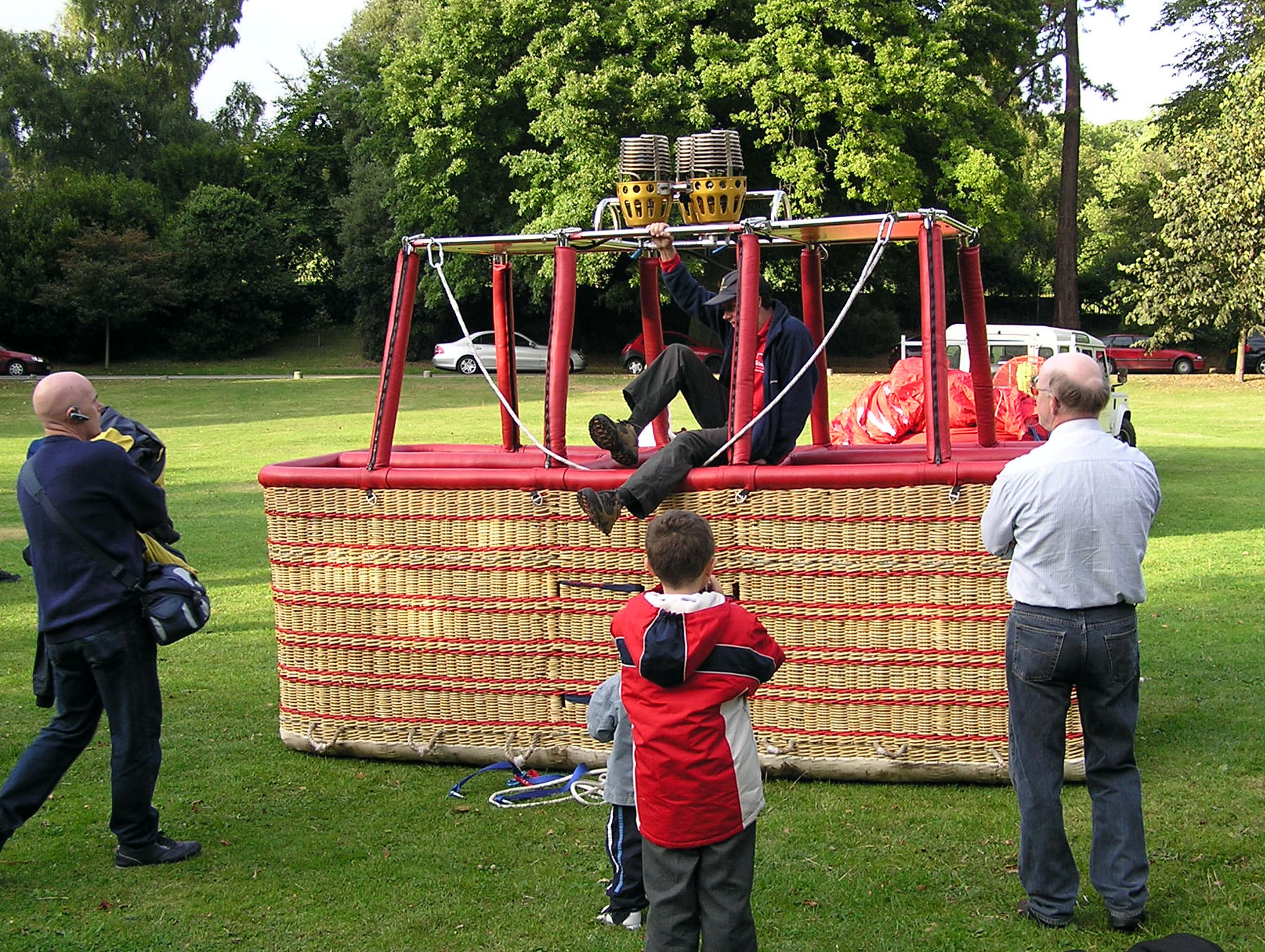
A wicker balloon basket capable of holding 16 passengers

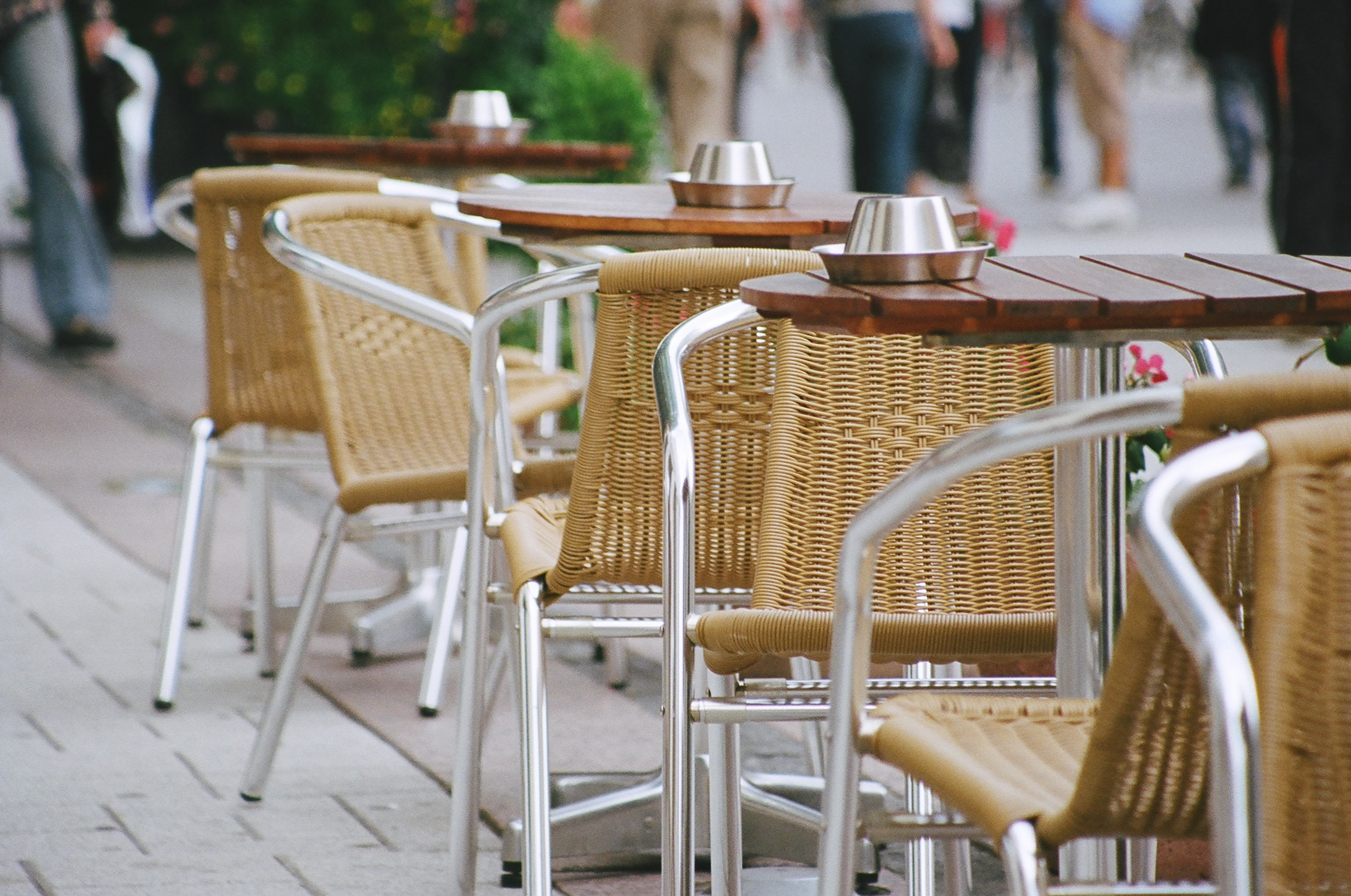
Plastic-wicker chairs

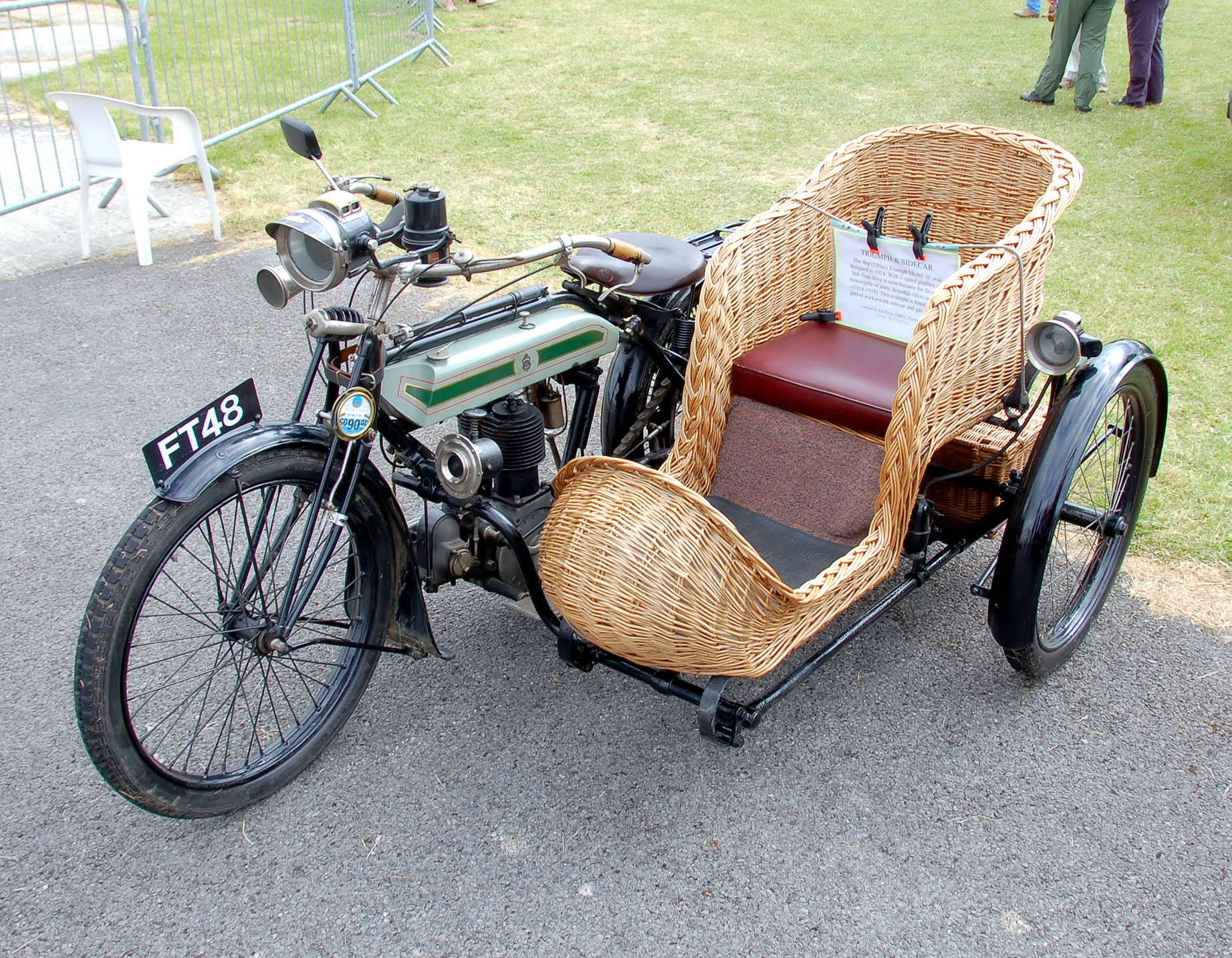
Triumph Model H motorcycle with wicker sidecar

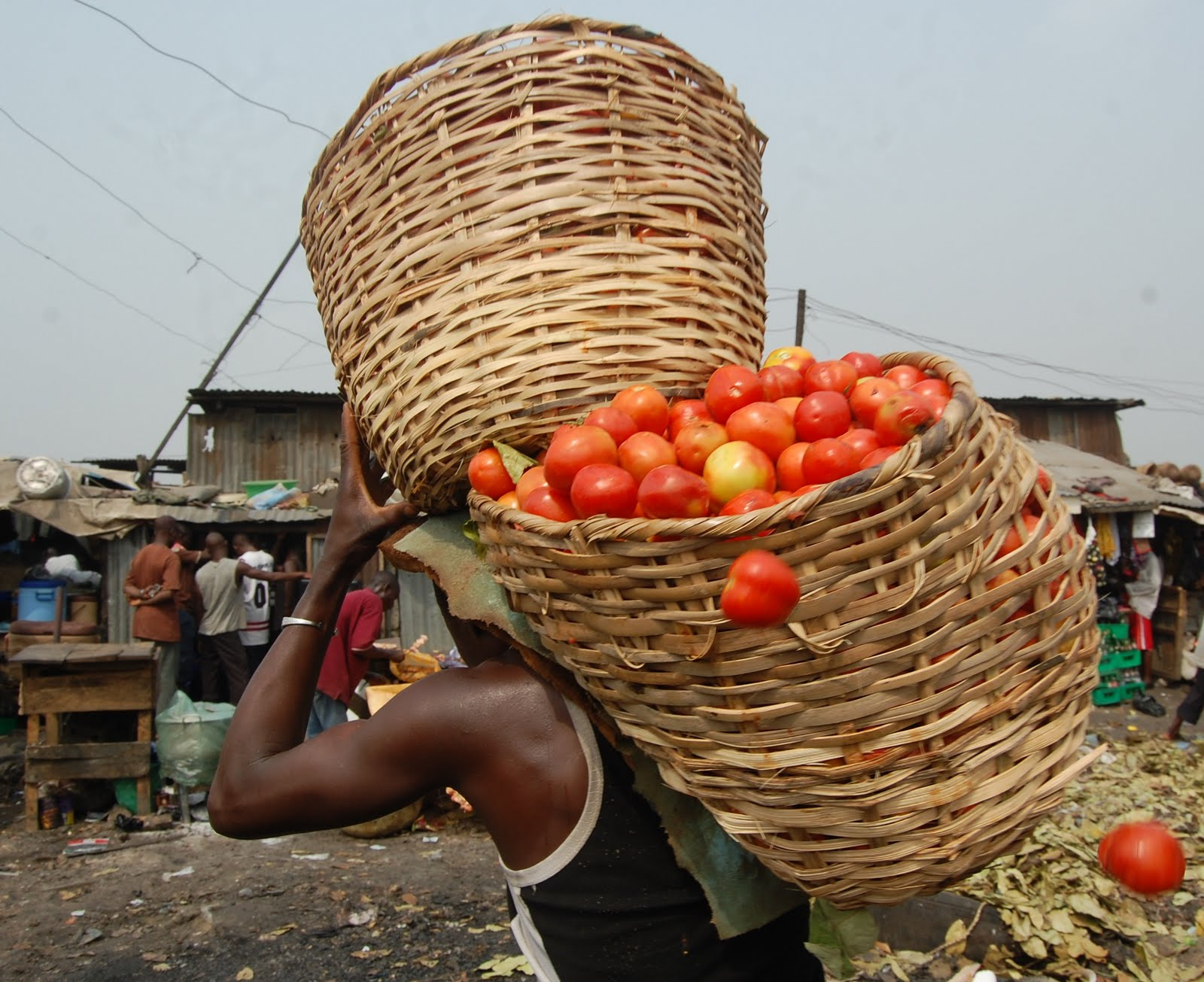
Man carrying tomatoes in wicker baskets, Nigeria, 2017

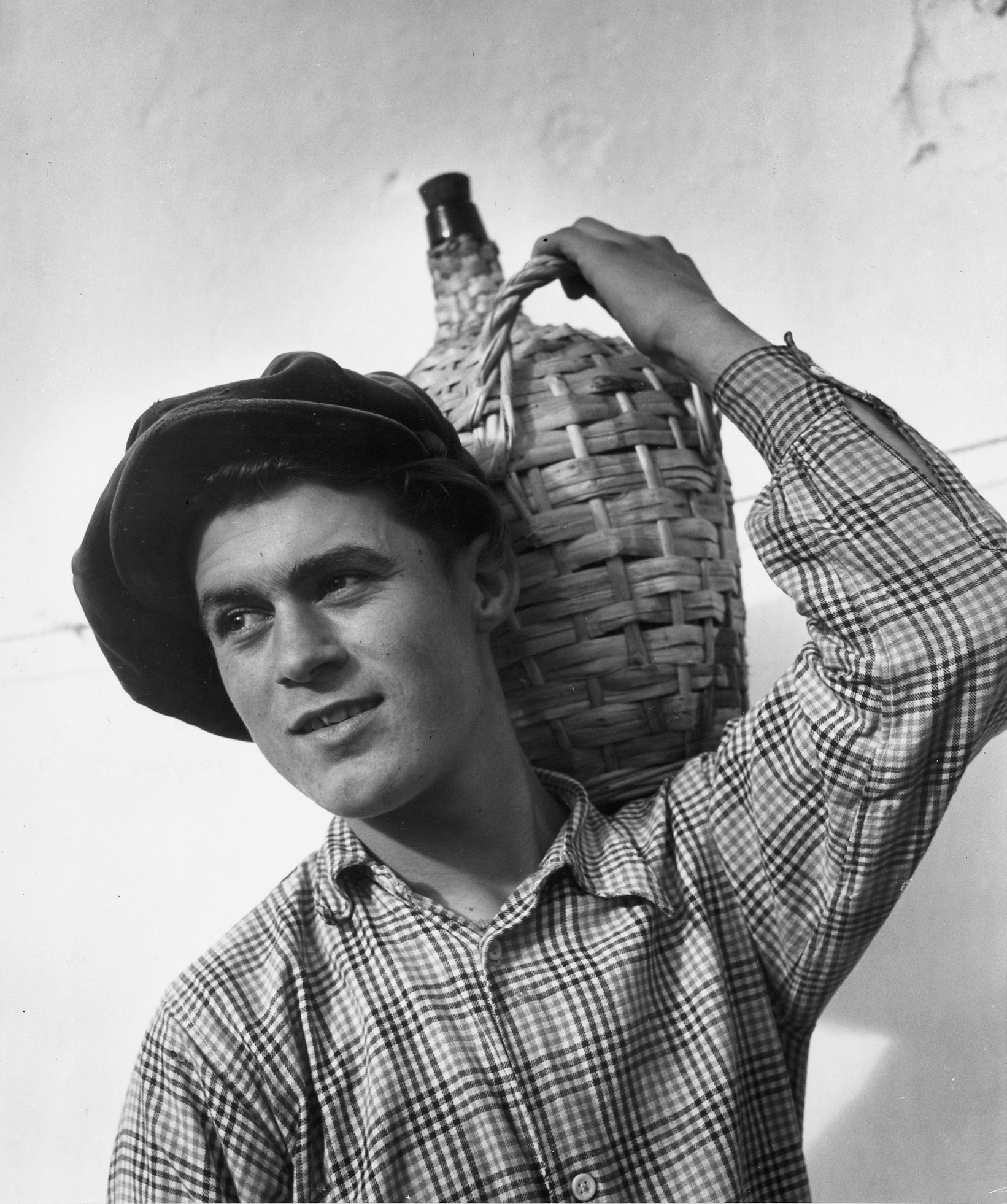
Man carrying a jug with woven wicker handle. Portugal, 1950

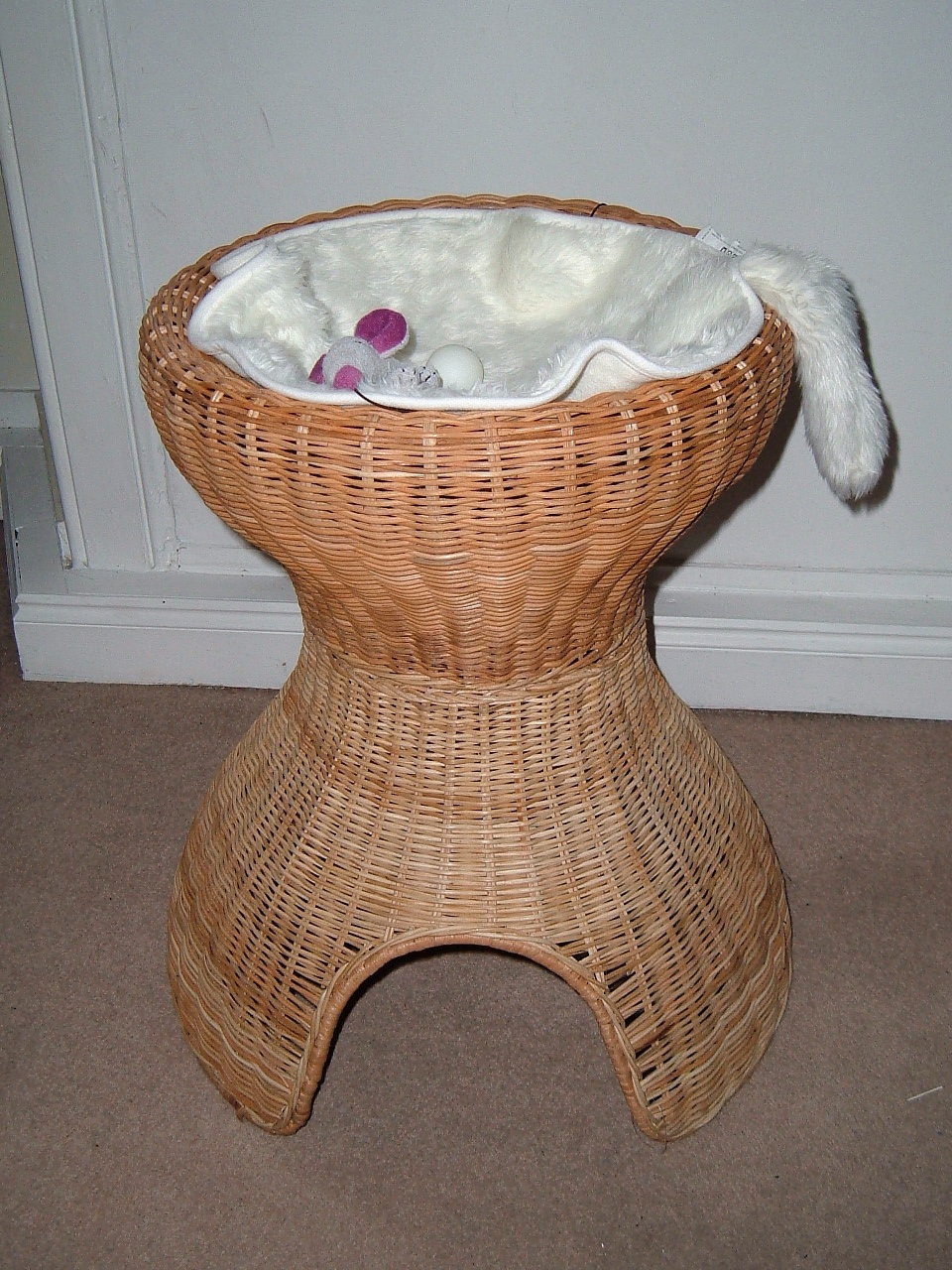
A wickerwork cat tree from IKEA circa mid-2000s

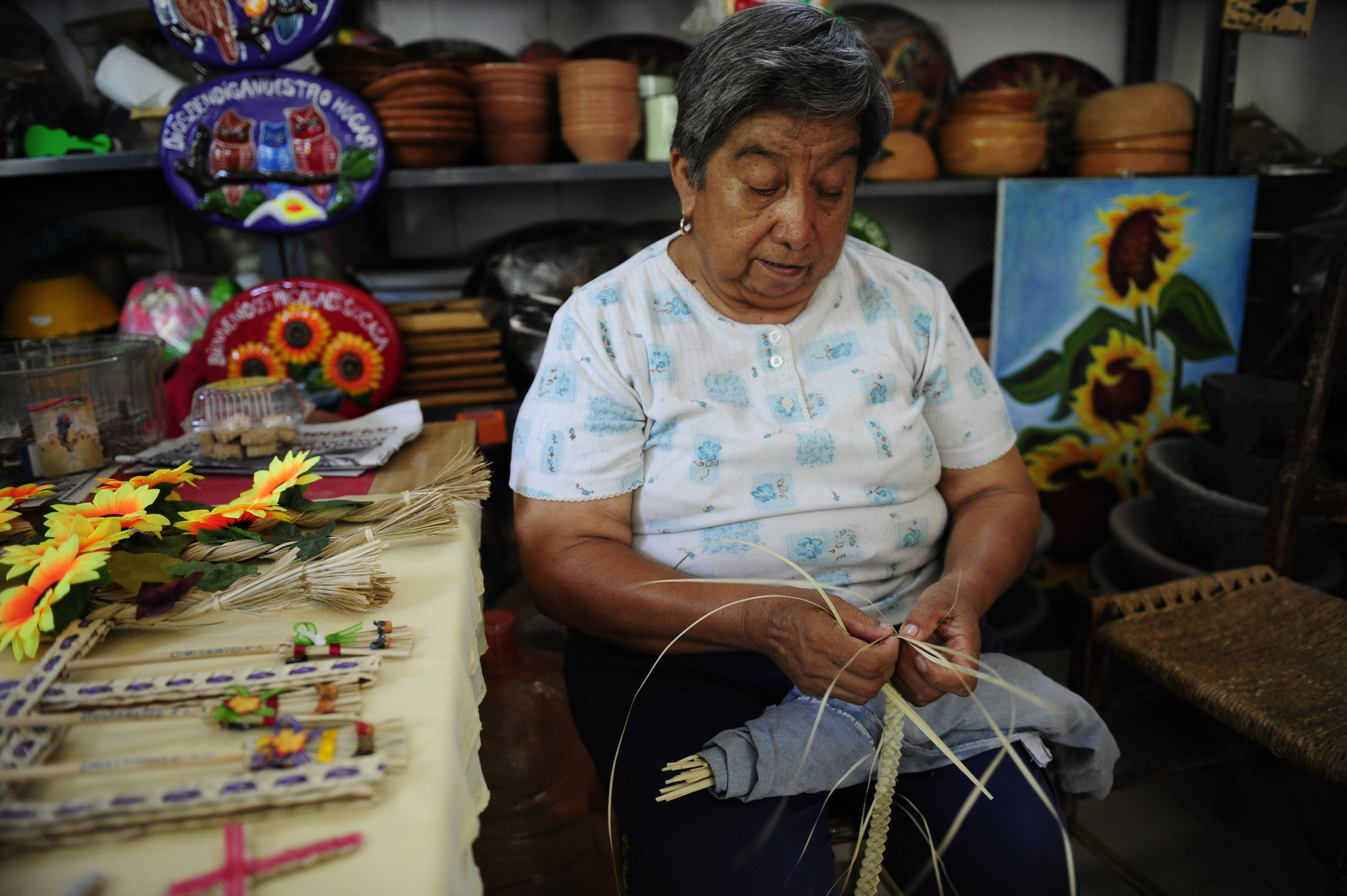
Wicker craftswoman in Nuevo León, Mexico

== See also ==
- Rattan
- Wattle
- Resin wicker
- Caning (furniture)
- Wicker man
