= High–low pricing =

Pricing strategy

High–low pricing (or hi–low pricing) is a type of pricing strategy adopted by companies, usually small and medium-sized retail firms, where a firm initially charges a high price for a product and later, when it has become less desirable, sells it at a discount or through clearance sales. The term also applies where a business sells many of its lines at a higher price than the market rate and discounts a small number of products in order to attract customers.

Prospective customers may be unaware of a product's typical market price, or have a strong belief that "discount" is synonymous with "low price", or have strong loyalty to the product, brand or retailer. High–low pricing strategy is effective because of consumer preference and shopping frequency. Consumers with higher income strongly prefer the high-low pricing and they shop frequently in the brand stores they like.

== Usage ==
There are many big firms using these types of pricing strategy (including, in North America, Reebok, Nike, and Target). Competition in shoemaking and the fashion industry is partly through high–low pricing (for example Macy's, Nordstrom). But some firms will not provide discounts and work on a fixed rate of earnings following everyday low price strategies to compete in the market.

Marketing practices focus on the items offered for sale at low prices, but it can be expensive to maintain marketing campaigns in this manner.

An alternative way to use high–low pricing is to increase the price for a short time, sometimes as much as 500 per cent, after which it is "discounted" to what its normal selling price. After the price is reduced to the "sale" price, it may often stay at that price for a long time, sometimes longer than two weeks, after which customers may begin to question whether the reduction is genuine. Artificial discounts of this sort are illegal in the United Kingdom because it counts as an unfair commercial practice.

== See also ==
- Pricing strategies
