= A Perfect Contradiction =

2014 album by Paloma Faith

- Standard cover

Studio album by Paloma Faith
- Released: 10 March 2014
- Recorded: 2013–2014
- Genres: Pop; R&B; jazz; soul; disco
- Length: 39:22
- Labels: RCA; Epic
- Producers: Paloma Faith; Klas Åhlund; Eric Appapoulay; BB Banks; Chris Braide; AC Burrell; G'harah Degeddingseze; Mr Hudson; Komi and JL; Stuart Matthewman; Kieron Mcintosh; Dave Odlum; Dave Okumu; Plan B; Steve Robson; Raphael Saadiq; Taura Stinson; Kyle Townsend; Dylan Wiggins; Pharrell Williams

Paloma Faith chronology
Fall to Grace (2012)	A Perfect Contradiction (2014)	The Architect (2017)

Singles from A Perfect Contradiction
- 1. "Can't Rely on You" Released: 23 February 2014; 2. "Only Love Can Hurt Like This" Released: 11 May 2014; 3. "Trouble with My Baby" Released: 11 August 2014

A Perfect Contradiction is the third studio album by English singer Paloma Faith, released by Sony Music Entertainment on 10 March 2014. Musically, it is a pop album, with elements of R&B, jazz, soul, Motown and disco. The album received mixed reviews; it spawned three singles; "Can't Rely on You", "Only Love Can Hurt Like This", "Trouble with My Baby". The first two of these charted within the top 10 in the United Kingdom and "Only Love Can Hurt Like This" topped the charts in Australia.

On 15 September 2014, it was announced that a repackaged version of the album, entitled A Perfect Contradiction: Outsiders' Edition, was set to be released on 10 November 2014, postponed from the original date of 3 November 2014. It features three new singles; "Ready for the Good Life", "Leave While I'm Not Looking" and "Beauty Remains". It also includes new songs as well as a rearranged version of "Changing", Faith's collaboration with Sigma.

== Background ==
Faith had posted pictures of her recording her new album for several months on Instagram. She then announced that her new album would be entitled A Perfect Contradiction. On 13 January 2014 Faith premiered the video for the album's lead single, "Can't Rely on You". The single was produced by Pharrell Williams, who wrote the song along with Faith. Faith previewed the song "Love Only Leaves You Lonely" at a June 2013 performance in Liverpool, and has since made the song available as a pre-order preview on the iTunes Store. The song "Only Love Can Hurt Like This" was premiered in a stripped back acoustic version on Amazon, and the song was later performed at a Burberry fashion show in February 2014. 90-second previews of all the songs were made available in February 2014 on iTunes, before Faith streamed the album on SoundCloud via Nylon a few days before the album's release.

== Composition ==
Musically, the album is a pop record that blends elements of R&B, jazz, soul, Motown, and disco. While it maintains the retro-soul influences found in Faith's earlier work, A Perfect Contradiction introduces a more polished production style, drawing from 1970s soul and disco. The album features doo-wop-inspired tracks and slower ballads, as well as rhythm-focused arrangements that mark a shift from the ballad-driven approach of Fall to Grace. Across the record, Faith explores a sound that remains rooted in classic pop traditions, while incorporating a broader range of upbeat, vintage-inspired styles.

=== Songs ===
The second single from the album, "Only Love Can Hurt Like This", was written entirely by Diane Warren, who has written for Faith twice again, towards the single "Leave While I'm Not Looking" featured on A Perfect Contradiction: Outsiders' Edition, and "The Crazy Ones" featured as the main theme of the film Miss You Already. "Impossible Heart" was written by Faith and Christopher Braide, who had previously worked with Faith on her second studio album Fall to Grace towards the song "30 Minute Love Affair". Both songs used synthesized instrumentation. "Trouble with My Baby" was originally written with Steve Robson in synchronisation with Fall to Grace, but was considered by Faith as "inappropriate" or "misfitting" in regards of the theme of Fall to Grace. As a result, the song was saved for a later album, specifically A Perfect Contradiction.

== Promotion ==
=== Singles ===
The first single from the album, "Can't Rely on You", written with and produced by Pharrell Williams, reached number 10 on the UK Top 40 charts in its first week. It was released on 23 February 2014, although the song had been premiered on YouTube, along with its music video directed by Paul Gore and features Faith speaking in Italian in an elaborate retro introduction, the previous month, and had been playing on UK radio since then. It is Faith's second Top 10 single, following 2012's "Picking Up the Pieces". In late March 2014, Faith announced on her social networking sites that "Only Love Can Hurt Like This" would be the second single from the album. The single's video, directed by Gore, was premiered on 28 April 2014 with the single being released on 11 May 2014. It reached number 6 in the UK Singles Chart becoming Faith's highest-charting single there. In Australia the song peaked at number one, also becoming Faith's highest-charting single there.

The third single, "Trouble with My Baby", was officially confirmed by Faith on 27 June 2014, with the video for the song directed by Gore to premiere at midnight on 30 June 2014. The song was later confirmed to have an 11 August 2014 release date. It did not chart within the top 100 on the UK Singles Chart due to lack of promotion. "Ready for the Good Life" was released as the lead single and overall fourth single from the repackaged version of A Perfect Contradiction on 9 November 2014. It reached number 68 on the UK Singles Chart for the week ending 16 November 2014. "Leave While I'm Not Looking", penned by Diane Warren as a follow-up to Faith's highest-charting single "Only Love Can Hurt Like This", was announced in late November 2014 to be the album's fifth single. The single received minimal promotion and airplay; it also did not receive a music video. "Beauty Remains" was announced in February 2015 to be the sixth single from the album. The song, along with an accompanying music video classified as suitable for those aged 15 and upwards, was released in March 2015, and despite an appearance on the final of The Voice UK, the song did not chart in any territories.

=== Tour ===
To promote A Perfect Contradiction, Faith embarked her third concert tour on 23 May 2014, called Paloma Faith Tour. Originally visiting European countries, Faith announced new tour dates for Australia and the United States and a UK arena tour in August through September 2014. The concert tour consisted of a total of 66 dates and ended in Australia on 16 May 2015. In the lead-up to this arena leg, Faith performed in smaller venues, including a pair of rescheduled shows at Manchester's O2 Apollo in late 2014—original dates that had been postponed due to ill health.

== Critical reception ==
A Perfect Contradiction ratings
Aggregate scores
Source	Rating
AnyDecentMusic?	5.8/10
Metacritic	66/100
Review scores
Source	Rating
AllMusic	4/5 stars
The Daily Telegraph	3/5 stars
Digital Spy	3/5 stars
Drowned in Sound	4/10
The Guardian	3/5 stars
The Independent	3/5 stars
The Irish Times	2/5 stars
MusicOMH	3/5 stars
The Observer	2/5 stars
PopMatters	6/10

On Metacritic, which assigns a normalised rating out of 100 to reviews from mainstream critics, A Perfect Contradiction received an average score of 66, which indicates "generally favorable reviews", based on 10 reviews.

AllMusic gave the album a very positive review, giving it 4 stars out of 5, calling the production of the album slick and funky, complementing the new musical direction, highlighting the new sound of disco, and '70's soul-influences on the album. Digital Spy made this comment and called the album "solid but unsurprising". The album earned 3 stars out of 5 from The Guardian, which called it "consistent but formulaic," noting that the Motown feel "starts to grate by the end." It added that Faith sticks to the familiar path of her earlier albums, offering more doo-wop-inspired tunes and lovesick ballads. The Observer gave the album 2 stars out of 5, again making the comment that the album was upbeat but generic, while The Daily Telegraph gave 3 stars out of 5 from, who said "Faith has a nice ear for melody and smart turn of phrase. She sounds like a one woman Phil Spector girl group on Taste My Own Tears, and does a slick, jazzy soul turn on Other Woman. It may be nothing new but her punchy, uplifting set of pastiche Sixties and Seventies soul, r’n’b and disco is perfectly pitched with just an appealing hint of exaggeration." The Independent gave the album 3 stars out of 5, commenting on a lack of originality but complimenting "Can't Rely on You".

== Commercial performance ==
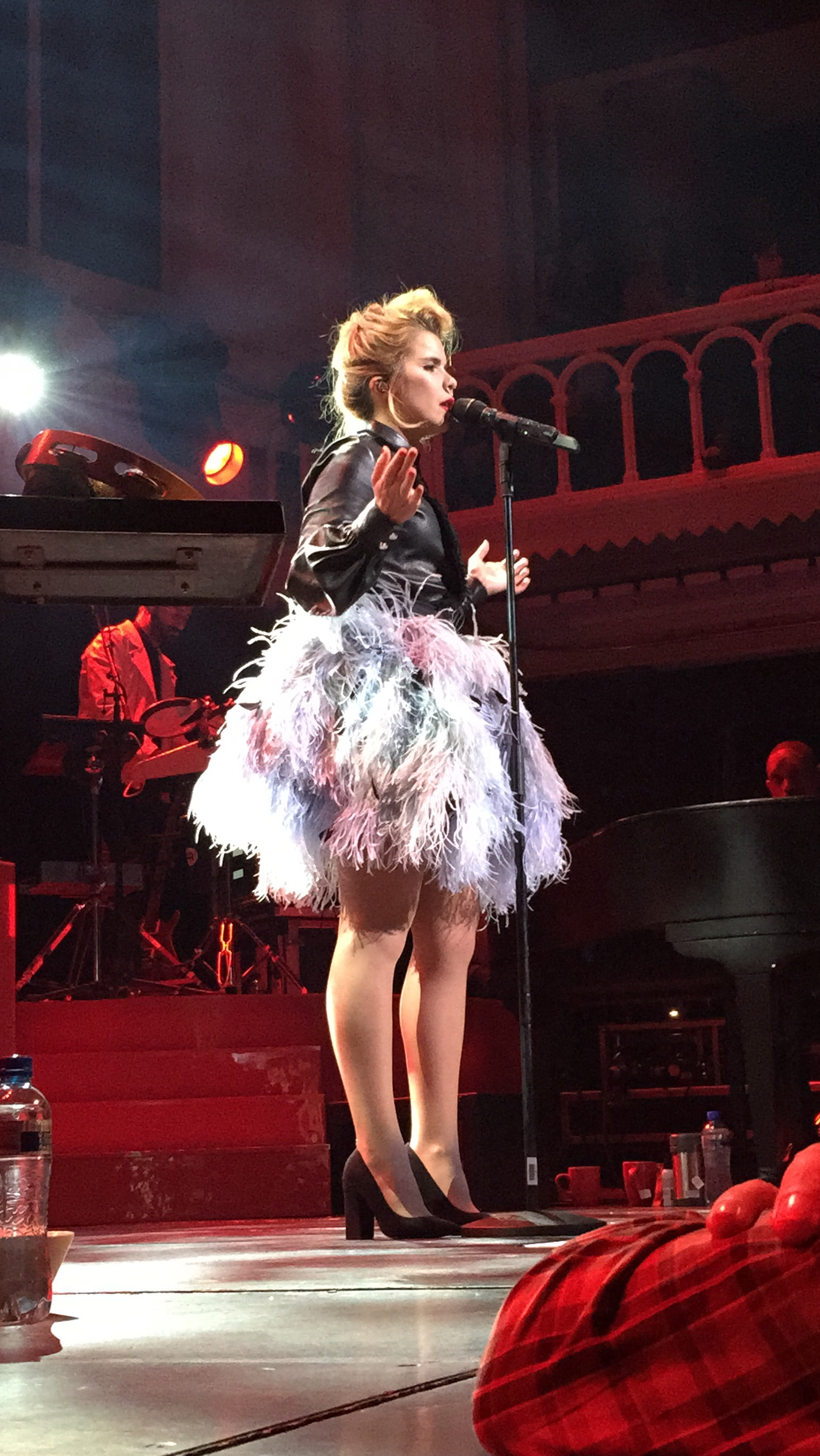
Faith performing in February 2015 at Paradiso Amsterdam

A Perfect Contradiction debuted on the UK Albums Chart at number two, beaten by The Take Off and Landing of Everything by Elbow from the top spot. The album spent 29 weeks inside the top 10. On 22 August 2014 the album received a Platinum certification for selling over 300,000 copies in the UK. After the single "Only Love Can Hurt Like This" reached number one in Australia, the album jumped up from number 15 on the charts to its peak at number four, becoming Faith's highest-charting album in that country. The album also peaked at number 8 in Ireland, 17 in New Zealand, 41 in the Netherlands and 91 in Switzerland. A Perfect Contradiction became the sixth best selling album of 2014, and the best selling album for a female artist in the UK. It had sold a total of 342,000 copies in the UK as of October 2014. On 20 February 2015 it was certified double platinum for sales exceeding 600,000 copies in the UK.

== Track listing ==
A Perfect Contradiction – Standard edition
No.	Title	Writer(s)	Producer(s)	Length
1.	"Can't Rely on You"	Pharrell Williams	Williams	3:15
2.	"Mouth to Mouth"	Paloma Faith; Raphael Saadiq; Taura Stinson	Saadiq; AC Burrell^{[a]}; G'harah Degeddingseze^{[a]}; Stinson^{[b]}	4:23
3.	"Take Me"	Faith; John Stephens; Benjamin McIldowie	Mr Hudson; Degeddingseze^{[a]}; Burrell^{[a]}	3:10
4.	"Only Love Can Hurt Like This"	Diane Warren; Keith Uddin	Burrell; Kyle Townsend^{[b]}	3:52
5.	"Other Woman"	Faith; Ben Drew; Eric Appapoulay; Kieron Mcintosh	Plan B; Appapoulay^{[a]}; Mcintosh^{[a]}	3:08
6.	"Taste My Own Tears"	Faith; Stuart Matthewman	Burrell; Degeddingseze; Matthewman^{[b]}	3:02
7.	"Trouble with My Baby"	Faith; Andrea Martin; Steve Robson	Robson	3:00
8.	"The Bigger You Love (The Harder You Fall)"	Gerald A Marcellino; Melvin E Larson	Dylan Wiggins; Stinson^{[b]}	3:01
9.	"Impossible Heart"	Faith; Chris Braide	Braide; Burrell^{[a]}; Degeddingseze^{[a]}	4:31
10.	"Love Only Leaves You Lonely"	Faith; Saadiq; Stinson; Wiggins	Saadiq; Wiggins; Stinson^{[b]}	4:31
11.	"It's the Not Knowing"	Faith; Matthewman	Dave Okumu; Matthewman^{[b]}	3:29
Total length:				39:22

A Perfect Contradiction – Deluxe edition (bonus tracks)
No.	Title	Writer(s)	Length
12.	"Can't Rely on You" (Live from the Kitchen)	Paloma Faith; Williams	3:42
13.	"Trouble with My Baby" (Live from the Living Room)	Faith; Martin; Robson	2:57
14.	"Only Love Can Hurt Like This" (Off the Cuff)	Warren	3:43
15.	"It's the Not Knowing" (Exposed Version)	Faith; Matthewman	3:35

A Perfect Contradiction: Outsiders' Edition
No.	Title	Writer(s)	Producer(s)	Length
12.	"Beauty Remains"	Paloma Faith; Bernard Butler; Fyfe Dangerfield	Bernard Butler	3:36
13.	"Ready for the Good Life"	Faith; Klas Åhlund; Adam Baptiste; Måns Wredenburg; Linus Wiklund	Åhlund	3:25
14.	"Leave While I'm Not Looking"	Diane Warren	Komi; JL; Burrell	3:53
15.	"Changing" (alternate version)	Peter Kelleher; Ben Kohn; Tom Barnes; Wayne Hector; Ella Eyre	BB Banks; Faith^{[c]}; David Odlum^{[c]}	3:16

A Perfect Contradiction: Outsiders' Edition – Deluxe edition (disc 2)
No.	Title	Length
1.	"Mouth to Mouth" (Live from BBC Proms 2014)	4:44
2.	"Take Me" (Live from BBC Proms 2014)	4:47
3.	"Trouble with My Baby" (Live from BBC Proms 2014)	3:24
4.	"I'd Rather Go Blind" (with Ty Taylor) (Live from BBC Proms 2014)	5:27
5.	"Other Woman" (Live from BBC Proms 2014)	3:50
6.	"It's the Not Knowing" (Live from BBC Proms 2014)	3:58
7.	"Only Love Can Hurt Like This" (Live from BBC Proms 2014)	4:12
8.	"Upside Down" (Live from BBC Proms 2014)	4:47
9.	"Can't Rely on You" (Live from BBC Proms 2014)	4:41

=== Notes ===
- ^{^[a]} signifies an additional record producer.
- ^{^[b]} signifies a vocal producer.
- ^{^[c]} signifies a co-record producer.
- "The Bigger You Love (The Harder You Fall)" is a Sisters Love cover.
- At the BBC Proms, Faith did perform fifteen songs, although six were not included in the "Deluxe Outsider's Edition" -see above. The omitted tracks are: "Love Only Leaves You Lonely", "Taste My Own Tears", "Let Me Down Easy" (a Bettye LaVette cover), "All Night Long" (a Keely Smith cover), "Picking Up The Pieces", and the encore, "Freedom".
- The Outsiders' Edition was initially meant to include another song titled "Best Bad Habit" written by Diane Warren and produced by Komi, but this was cut from the final tracklist before its release.

== Personnel ==
Credits were adapted from AllMusic.

- The Dap-Kings – horns
- Luke Potashnick – guitar
- Sam Miller – engineer
- Justin Merrill – engineer
- Chris Galland – assistant
- Rob Barron – piano
- Paloma Faith – background vocals, lead vocals
- Seye Adelekan – guitar, background vocals
- Tom Rees-Roberts – trumpet, flugelhorn
- Tom Hough – engineer
- Gharah Degeddingseze – producer, string arrangements, horn arrangements, additional production, instrumentation
- Rick Bryant – assistant
- Mario Luccy – engineer
- Rory More – Hammond B3
- Dave Guy – trumpet
- Mike Horner – assistant engineer
- Plan B – producer
- Dave Okumu – producer, instrumentation
- Taura Stinson – vocal producer, background vocals
- Mike Larson – mixing
- Joy Joseph – percussion
- Ben Drew – background vocals
- Wayne Gordon – assistant
- James Gardiner-Bateman – alto saxophone, horn arrangements, baritone saxophone
- Kyle Townsend – vocal producer
- Alalal – engineer
- Christopher Braide – producer
- Bryan "Bdub" White – bass
- Steve Payne – guitar
- Delbert Bowers – assistant
- David Standish – photography
- Roberto Angrisani – background vocals
- Naomi Miller – background vocals
- Obenewa Aboah – background vocals
- Tom Wright-goss – Bass, Guitar
- Kieron McIntosh – organ, keyboards, trumpet, piano, programming, additional production, background vocals
- Nick Brown – assistant
- Simon Guzman – assistant
- Andy Menhenitt – assistant
- Komi Hakam – drum programming
- Baby N Sola – background vocals
- Jerry "JL" Lang – drum programming
- Janelle Martin – background vocals
- Aisha Shreena – background vocals
- Dylan – instrumentation, keyboards, producer
- Manny Marroquin – mixing
- Andrea Martin – background vocals
- Stuart Matthewman – engineer, vocal producer
- Raphael Saadiq – producer, instrumentation
- John Davis – mastering
- Aisha McCray – background vocals
- Femio Hernández – mixing assistant, assistant
- Geoff Gascoyne – bass
- Cochemea Gastelum – baritone saxophone
- Joi Gilliam – background vocals
- Pharrell Williams – arranger, background vocals, producer, instrumentation
- Gerry Brown – engineer
- Neal Sugarman – tenor saxophone
- A.C. Burrell – producer, horn arrangements, additional production, instrumentation, vocal producer, string arrangements
- Andrew Coleman – engineer
- Gabriel Roth – horn engineer
- Hart Gunther – arranger, digital editing, engineer
- Eric Appapoulaye – bass, hammond b3, piano, drums, background vocals, additional production
- Trevor Mires – bass trombone, tenor trombone
- Dan Parry – mixing
- Mr. Hudson – guitar, programming, engineer, producer, drums, percussion
- Chris Braide – vocal producer
- Betty Wright – background vocals

== Charts ==
=== Weekly charts ===
A Perfect Contradiction weekly chart performance
Chart (2014)	Peak position
Australian Albums (ARIA)	4
Belgian Albums (Ultratop Flanders)	64
Dutch Albums (Album Top 100)	41
Irish Albums (IRMA)	8
New Zealand Albums (RMNZ)	9
Scottish Albums (Official Charts)	2
Swiss Albums (Schweizer Hitparade)	91
UK Albums (Official Charts)	2
UK Album Downloads (Official Charts)	4
US Billboard 200	176
US Heatseekers (Billboard)	6

=== Year-end charts ===
A Perfect Contradiction year-end chart performance
Chart (2014)	Position
Australian Albums Chart	29
UK Albums Chart	6
Chart (2015)	Position
UK Albums Chart	23

=== Decade-end charts ===
A Perfect Contradiction decade-end chart performance
Chart (2010–2019)	Position
UK Albums (OCC)	78

== Certifications ==
A Perfect Contradiction certifications
Region	Certification	Certified units/sales
Australia (ARIA)	Gold	35,000^{^}
New Zealand (RMNZ)	Platinum	15,000^{‡}
United Kingdom (BPI)	2× Platinum	771,105
^{^} Shipments figures based on certification alone.^{‡} Sales+streaming figures based on certification alone.

== Release history ==
A Perfect Contradiction release history
Region	Date	Format(s)	Version(s)	Label	Ref.
United Kingdom	10 March 2014	CD; Digital download	Standard; Deluxe	Sony	
United States	7 October 2014	CD; Digital download	Standard	Sony	
United Kingdom	10 November 2014	CD; Digital download	Outsiders' Edition	Sony	
