= Just Be (Paloma Faith song) =

Single by Paloma Faith

from the album Fall to Grace
- Released: 16 December 2012
- Length: 4:38 (album version); 3:31 (radio edit)
- Label: RCA
- Songwriters: Paloma Faith; Greg Wells; Matt Hales
- Producers: Nellee Hooper; Jake Gosling

Paloma Faith singles chronology
"Never Tear Us Apart" (2012)	"Just Be" (2012)	"Black & Blue" (2013)

Music video
- "Just Be" on YouTube

"Just Be" is a song by British recording artist Paloma Faith from her second studio album Fall to Grace (2012). It was released on 16 December 2012 by RCA Records as the fourth single from the album. Written by Faith, Greg Wells and Matt Hales, "Just Be" is a "love song for real lovers". One critic called it an honest portrait of the highs and lows of relationships. "Just Be" reached Number 66 in the UK Singles Chart, three months before it was released. The official music video was released on 5 November 2012 and features Faith in a love affair with a man in New York City.

== Background ==
"Just Be" was written by Faith along with Greg Wells and Matt Hales. It was co-produced by Nellee Hooper and Jake Gosling. It was released by RCA Records on 16 December 2012. Explaining the meaning of the song, Faith stated "It's supposed to be a realistic love song for real lovers. It's saying, 'He gets on my nerves, but I love him.' I find that more endearing than, 'There's no one out there but him.' That seems naive. I have a lot of admiration for people who've been in relationships a long time, married for years. This is a more knowing take on romance." "Just Be" was used by ITV as the soundtrack to their New Season Drama trailer.

== Reception ==
=== Critical response ===
During his review of Fall to Grace, Digital Spy's Robert Copsey called "Just Be" a ballad that is "packed to the brim with old glamour". Copsey later gave the song five stars and stated that the song "strips back the usual grandiose production" and allows Faith's "rich and velvety voice to come to the fore". He added "The result is soul-pop perfection that, if we had it our way, would be topping the charts this Christmas." Trent Maynard from 4Music said "The song is an honest and moving portrait of the highs and lows of love and relationships." Perez Hilton commented that the song is "gorgeous", before adding "A power ballad that grabs you instantly by the heartstrings and doesn't let go till the song is over! No gimmicks here! Just a piano, a special voice, beautiful melodies and meaningful lyrics!" Mark Blankenship from Newnownext.com revealed that "Just Be" was his favourite Faith song, saying it is "a torchy ballad with some delicious theatrical touches. In the first chorus, my girl actually shushes her man! But because a true diva knows the importance of restraint, she doesn't repeat that shushing until the very end of the song. Twice is enough, y'all. She has made her point. And besides, that frees her up to growl like a wounded love tiger."

=== Chart performance ===
In early September 2012, "Just Be" entered the UK Singles Chart at number 66. It then went on to spend at total of 4 weeks in the top 100.

== Music video ==
The accompanying music video, directed by Emil Nava, was released on 5 November 2012. It was shot in black and white and on location in New York City. The video shows Faith in a tempestuous love affair with a man. Faith's lover is played by James D. Kelly, the same actor who previously appeared as her love interest in the videos for "Picking Up the Pieces, "30 Minute Love Affair" and "Never Tear Us Apart. Grace Carroll from Gigwise commented "Paloma Faith is no stranger to odd antics, so her choice to strip off – and sit on a bare wood floor – in her latest video is definitely one of the least strange things she's done."

== Live performances ==
To promote Fall to Grace, Faith performed "Just Be" on Later... with Jools Holland in May 2012. Viewers voted it the second best performance of the night during a poll on The Guardian's website. Faith included "Just Be" in her set for her performances at Somerset House in July. In August, Faith filmed and released an acoustic performance of the song. The following month, she included "Just Be" in her set list for BBC Radio 2's Live in Hyde Park concert.

== Track listing ==
- Digital download
1. "Just Be" – 4:38
- Digital EP
1. "Just Be" – 4:38
2. "Just Be" (Shy FX & B.Traits Mix) – 4:35
3. "Just Be" (Full Intention Remix) – 5:20
4. "Just Be" (Distance Remix) – 4:32

== Credits and personnel ==
Credits were adapted from Fall to Grace album liner notes.

- Paloma Faith – vocals, songwriter
- Greg Wells – songwriter
- Matt Hales – songwriter
- Nellee Hooper – producer, mixer, programming
- Jake Gosling – co-producer, programming
- Dave Miles – audio engineering
- Simon Gogerly – mix engineer
- Ed Harcourt – piano

== Charts ==
Chart (2012)	Peak position
UK Singles (Official Charts)	66

== Certifications ==
Region	Certification	Certified units/sales
United Kingdom (BPI)	Silver	200,000^{‡}
^{‡} Sales+streaming figures based on certification alone.

== Release history ==
Country	Release date	Format
United Kingdom	16 December 2012	Digital download
