= The Education of Sonny Carson =

1974 film directed by Michael Campus

- Original theatrical poster
- Directed by: Michael Campus
- Written by: Sonny Carson; Fred Hudson
- Produced by: David Golden; Irwin Yablans
- Starring: Rony Clanton; Don Gordon; Joyce Walker; Paul Benjamin; Mary Alice
- Cinematography: Edward R. Brown
- Edited by: Moe Howard; Edward Warschilka
- Music by: Coleridge-Taylor Perkinson Song lyrics by Bob Kessler
- Distributed by: Paramount Pictures
- Release date: July 17, 1974
- Running time: 104 minutes
- Country: United States
- Language: English
- Budget: $1,000,000

The Education of Sonny Carson is a 1974 American blaxploitation drama film based on the best-selling autobiography of Sonny Carson. Directed by The Mack director Michael Campus, the film stars Rony Clanton, Don Gordon, Joyce Walker, Paul Benjamin, and Mary Alice.

The film was released on July 17, 1974, by Paramount Pictures.

== Plot ==
A young Black American teenager and three of his friends are in the process of breaking into a local market to steal food and money. Sonny is subdued by police and soon finds himself, at the age of thirteen, serving a sentence of three months. While incarcerated, Sonny meets Willie, the leader of a local gang called the Lords and is initiated into the gang.

Years later an older Sonny, who is now heavily involved in gang activities is part of the rivalry between The Lords and a fellow gang, the Tomahawks, also known as the Hawks. Sonny is deeply entrenched in the lifestyle of a Lord, which includes frequent brawls with the Hawks. During one of these fights, one of Sonny's friends, a Lord named Li'l Boy, is fatally wounded by a stiletto. Sonny and the rest of the gang arrive at Li'l Boy's wake. As they are leaving, the other gang members notice Sonny who is attempting to purchase a bouquet of flowers from a nearby shop. However, he is unable to afford it.

Sonny then robs a white man, who is carrying a telegram with change of $100 in it. With the money Sonny purchases the flowers and places them on Li'l Boy's casket. For his crime Sonny is arrested and later brutalized by police during interrogation. He is sentenced to between one and three years in prison. While incarcerated Sonny unexpectedly reunites with Willie, who teaches Sonny about the harsh realities of prison life. Sonny's father visits him in prison, letting Sonny know that he is still being supported by his family.

The brutality of the guards and the harshness of prison life quickly become evident to Sonny. In one instance Willie is beaten nearly to death by the guards as Sonny watches. Willie tells Sonny that he can no longer endure such treatment. That night, Willie is forcibly dragged from his cell by the guards. They toss him over the railing, causing him to fall to his death. Sonny, who is deeply affected by his time in prison, serves out the remainder of his time and returns to his family.

While trying to reestablish connections with his former gang members, Sonny learns that the drug trade has claimed the lives of many of his former friends. With a renewed purpose in life, Sonny fights the drug trade under a new alias, Mwlina Lmiri Abubadika. The film ends in the 1970s, long before Abubadika's controversial involvement in New York City politics.

== Background ==
The Education of Sonny Carson was produced on a budget of $1 million. Director Michael Campus was therefore forced to improvise in order to save money, such as obscuring the layout of a room with darkness, allowing the same room to be used for multiple settings. In order to film Sonny Carson's violent gang initiation, during which Sonny is beaten by gang members as he runs through them, the camera was placed in a metal cage and filmed from two separate points of view: one, in which Sonny is shown running through the gauntlet, and the other, which is shot from a first-person perspective.

The film explores challenges facing the African American population during their struggle to obtain civil rights, and sheds light on both political and social issues of the time such as poverty, drug abuse, and police discrimination and brutality.

== In popular culture ==
Wu-Tang Clan, Prodigy of Mobb Deep, AZ, Common, Ghostface Killah, Pete Rock, Lauryn Hill, Roc Marciano, 2 Chainz, Kur and DJ Rob Swift have sampled dialogue from the film in their music.

Rapper 21 Savage sampled "Flashbulbs" from the Soundtrack album on his hit single "Bank Account" from his debut album Issa Album.

Travis Scott sampled the same track on "Oh, My Dis Side" (with Quavo) from his debut album Rodeo in 2015.

Meek Mill sampled dialogue from the film in his reply "Wanna Know" to Drake's diss track "Back 2 Back".

Italian rapper Sfera Ebbasta also sampled "Exercise Run", a song from the film's soundtrack, in his song "XNX".

Netflix's The Get Down uses the quotation "What you doing on our turf, punk?" in episode six.

One Be Lo mentioned the movie in his song “The G Gap.”

== See also ==
- List of hood films
