= Fully Exposed =

Studio album by Willie Hutch
- Released: 7.9.1973
- Studio: Village Recorders, Westwood, Los Angeles, California
- Genre: Soul, funk
- Length: 45:29
- Label: Motown
- Producer: Willie Hutch

Willie Hutch chronology
Seasons For Love (1970)	Fully Exposed (1973)	The Mack (1973)

Professional ratings
Review scores
Source	Rating
Allmusic	3/5 stars

Fully Exposed was the third studio album by soul musician, songwriter, and record producer Willie Hutch. It was released in 1973 on Motown Records, the same year as Hutch's soundtrack to The Mack.

== Track listing ==
All tracks composed by Willie Hutch; except where indicated

1. "I Wanna Be Where You Are" (Arthur Ross, Leon Ware) - 4:35
2. "Can't Get Ready for Losing You" (Richard Hutch, Willie Hutch) - 5:51
3. "I Just Wanted to Make Her Happy" - 4:25
4. "California My Way" - 7:30
5. "Tell Me Why Has Our Love Turned Cold" - 4:08
6. "Sunshine Lady" - 3:56
7. "I'll Be There" (Berry Gordy, Bob West, Hal Davis, Willie Hutch) - 5:04
8. "If You Ain't Got No Money (You Can't Get No Honey)" - 5:04
9. "Ain't Nothing Like Togetherness" - 4:56

== Personnel ==
- Willie Hutch - guitar, vocals, arrangements
- Carolyn Willis, Dennis Alpert, Julia Tillman Waters, Maxine Willard Waters, Milton Hayes, Oren Waters, Richard Hutch - backing vocals
- Lawrence "Slim" Dickens - bass guitar
- King Errisson, Sam Clayton - congas
- Fred White - drums
- Tommy Myles - flute, saxophone
- Tim Lawson - guitar
- Alan Estes, Gene Estes - percussion
- Joe Sample - piano

Technical

- Rick Heenan - engineer
- Eddy Theodorou - direction, management
- Jim Britt - photography
