= Trouble with My Baby =

Single by Paloma Faith

from the album A Perfect Contradiction
- Released: 11 August 2014
- Length: 3:00
- Label: RCA
- Songwriter(s): Paloma Faith; Andrea Martin; Steve Robson
- Producer(s): Steve Robson

Paloma Faith singles chronology
"Only Love Can Hurt Like This" (2014)	"Trouble with My Baby" (2014)	"Changing" (2014)

Music video
- "Trouble with My Baby" on YouTube

"Trouble with My Baby" is a song by English singer Paloma Faith. It was released on 11 August 2014 as the third single to promote her third studio album, A Perfect Contradiction (2014).

== Background ==
In an interview, Faith revealed that the song was inspired by a relationship she had at the time. She described the man behind the song as her best friend, though their closeness had become romantically complicated. According to Faith, he drained her energy by constantly leaning on her for emotional support and borrowing money, ultimately adding to the stress of her already demanding life as a musician. She wrote the track as a pointed message to him, expressing frustration at how he had become a burden. These sentiments are reflected in the opening lines of the verses: "Well you ask for money..." and "You got problems with emotion...".

The song was originally written with Steve Robson in synchronisation with Faith's sophomore studio album Fall to Grace, but was considered by Faith as "inappropriate" or "misfitting" in regards of that album's theme. As a result, the song was saved for a later album, specifically A Perfect Contradiction.

== Composition ==
The song, "Trouble with My Baby", composed by Faith along with songwriters Andrea Martin and Steve Robson, has been described as drawing on Motown influences, with effective use of repetition that adds energy to the track.

== Music video ==
Following a teaser on Faith's YouTube, the official video for the song was released at midnight on 30 June 2014, garnering 17,000 views in 16 hours. As with the two previous videos from the album, the video was directed by Paul Gore of video directing company Somesuch & Co. It features a new recording of the song, with new vocals recorded over a slightly different instrumental, and visually, footage of Faith singing in a nightclub to a man is intercut with images of Faith's relationship with that man quickly going downhill, eventually ending in Faith killing the man.

== Release history ==
"Trouble with My Baby" release history
Region	Date	Format	Ref.
United Kingdom	11 August 2014	Digital download	
