= In and Out (Willie Hutch song) =

Single by Willie Hutch

from the album In and Out
- Released: 1982
- Genre: R&B, Soul, Funk, Disco
- Length: 7:17 (12" version)
- Label: Motown; 4501 MG
- Songwriter(s): Willie Hutch

Willie Hutch singles chronology
"All American Funkathon" (1978)	"In and Out" (1982)	"Keep On Jammin'" (1985)

"In and Out" is a song written and produced by Willie Hutch. It was released as a single in 1982 by Motown Records. Its B-side was a song called "Brother's Gonna Work It Out" which was featured in the 1973 blaxploitation film The Mack. The single itself peaked at number 29 on the Billboard Dance chart, number 55 on the Black Singles chart and number 51 on the British pop chart.

The song was included as a bonus track on a 2017 reissue of Hutch's 1985 album Making A Game Out Of Love, released by SoulMusic Records.

Fellow Motown artist Junior Walker also recorded a version of the song for his 1982 album Blow The House Down.

== Track listing ==
=== 1982 release ===
7" vinyl

- US: Motown / 4501MG

Side one
No.	Title	Length
1.	"In And Out"	7:17

Side two
No.	Title	Length
1.	"Brother's Gonna Work It Out"	5:00

== Personnel ==
- Composer, arrangement, producer: Willie Hutch for Stone Diamond Music Corp.

== Chart performance ==
Chart (1982)	Peak position
US Billboard Hot Dance Music/Club Play	#29
US Billboard Black Singles	#55
UK Singles Chart	#51
