= Don Gordon (actor) =

American actor (1926–2017)

- Born: Donald Walter Guadagno; November 13, 1926; Los Angeles, California, U.S.
- Died: April 24, 2017 (aged 90); Los Angeles, California, U.S.
- Resting place: Westwood Village Memorial Park Cemetery
- Occupation: Actor
- Years active: 1949–1993
- Spouses: Helen Westcott (m. 1948; div. 1953); Nita Talbot (m. 1954; div. 1958); Bek Nelson (m. 1959; div. 1979); Denise Farr (m. 1979)
- Children: 1

Don Gordon (born Donald Walter Guadagno; November 13, 1926 – April 24, 2017) was an American film and television actor. His most notable film roles were those in which he appeared alongside his friend Steve McQueen: Bullitt (1968), Papillon (1973) and The Towering Inferno (1974). Between the first and the last of those films he appeared in The Gamblers (1970), WUSA (1970), Cannon for Cordoba (1970), The Last Movie (1971), Z.P.G. (1972), Fuzz (1972), Slaughter (1972), The Mack (1973), The Education of Sonny Carson (1974) and Omen III: The Final Conflict (1981) as the ill-fated assistant to protagonist Damien Thorn.

== Early life ==
Gordon was born Donald Walter Guadagno in Los Angeles on November 13, 1926. He sold newspapers at the age of eight to help support his family during the Great Depression. He enlisted in the Navy at the age of fifteen after the attack on Pearl Harbor, convincing his mother to say he was eighteen. He served on both the USS Saratoga and the USS Yorktown earning eleven service stars.

Gordon entered drama school after the war and changed his name. As recounted after his death in The New York Times, Gordon was standing outside the drama school at Sunset Boulevard and Gordon Street, when "a classmate told him that he would never make it in show business with the surname Guadagno. The student then pointed to the street sign and said, 'Your name should be Don Gordon.'"

== Career ==
Gordon's television successes began with a starring role in the 1960–1961 syndicated series The Blue Angels, based on the elite precision flight demonstration pilots of the United States Navy Blue Angels. In 1962, he was nominated for a Primetime Emmy Award for his role as Joey Tassili on CBS's legal drama The Defenders, starring E.G. Marshall. During 1977–1978, he co-starred in the television show Lucan, and he played Harry in the CBS drama The Contender (1980).

=== Later career ===
Gordon's last credited film work was the 2005 documentary, Steve McQueen – The Essence of Cool. Gordon was interviewed along with several others who had worked with McQueen, with whom he was a close friend and colleague.

== Personal life ==
On February 18, 1948, Gordon (aged 21) married actress Helen Westcott (aged 20) in Oxnard, California. They divorced in 1953. Gordon was married to actress Nita Talbot from 1954 to 1958. He married actress Bek Nelson on December 31, 1959, in Los Angeles. They adopted a daughter, Gabrielle, in 1966, and they divorced on May 23, 1979. Don Gordon was married to his final and fourth wife Denise (née Farr, daughter of actress Felicia Farr) from December 24, 1979, until his death on April 24, 2017.

Gordon died at Cedars-Sinai Medical Center in Los Angeles on April 24, 2017, aged 90, survived by his wife, Denise, and his daughter, Gabrielle. He was diagnosed with cancer shortly before his death.

== Selected filmography ==
- Twelve O'Clock High (1949) - First Patient in Base Hospital (uncredited)
- Halls of Montezuma (1951) - Marine (uncredited)
- Let's Go Navy! (1951) - Sailor (uncredited)
- Force of Arms (1951) - Sergeant Webber (uncredited)
- It's a Big Country: An American Anthology (1951) - Mervin (uncredited)
- Girls in the Night (1953) - Irv Kellener
- Law and Order (1953) - Bart Durling (uncredited)
- The Beast from 20,000 Fathoms (1953) - Soldier (uncredited)
- Revolt at Fort Laramie (1956) - Jean Salignac
- The Benny Goodman Story (1956) - Tough Boy in Gang (uncredited)
- The Walter Winchell File "The Bargain" (1958) - Deek
- Alfred Hitchcock Presents (1959)
  - S5:E9, "Dead Weight" - Rudy Stickney, the Thug
- Cry Tough (1959) - Incho
- The Twilight Zone (1959, 1964)
  - S1:E13, "The Four of Us Are Dying" - Andy Marshak
  - S5:E16, "The Self-Improvement of Salvadore Ross" - Salvadore Ross
- The Outer Limits (1964)
  - S1:E19, "The Invisibles" - Agent Luis B. Spain
  - S1:E23, "Second Chance" - Dave Crowell
- Combat! (1965)
  - Season 4, Episode 8: "Crossfire" - Private Stevens
- The Lollipop Cover (1965) - Nick Bartaloni
- 12 O'Clock High (1966)
  - Season 3, Episode 9: "The Fighter Pilot" - Lieutenant Dominic DeJohn
- Voyage to the Bottom of the Sea (1966)
  - Season 3, Episode 7: "Deadly Waters" - Stan Kowalski
- The Invaders (1967)
  - Season 2, Episode 6: "The Trial" - Charlie Gilman
- Bullitt (1968) - Delgetti
- The Gamblers (1970) - Rooney
- WUSA (1970) - Bogdanovich
- Cannon for Cordoba (1971) - Jackson Harkness
- The Last Movie (1971) - Neville Robey
- Z.P.G. (1972) - George Borden
- Fuzz (1972) - Anthony La Bresca
- Slaughter (1972) - Harry
- The Mack (1973) - Hank
- The Return of Charlie Chan (1973) - Lambert
- Papillon (1973) - Julot
- The Education of Sonny Carson (1974) - Pigliani
- Columbo (1974)
  - Season 4, Episode 2: "Negative Reaction" - Alvin Deschler
- The Towering Inferno (1974) - Kappy
- The Streets of San Francisco (1975)
  - Season 3, Episode 22: "Labyrinth" - Tony Fabrieze
- Charlie's Angels (1976)
  - Season 1, Episode 2: "Hellride" - Gene Wells
- Out of the Blue (1980) - Charlie
- Omen III: The Final Conflict (1981) - Harvey Dean, assistant of the Antichrist Damien Thorn
- The Beast Within (1982) - Judge Curwin
- Knight Rider (1982) - Police Lieutenant Dickerson
- The Dukes of Hazzard (1983) - Frank Scanlon
- Knight Rider (1985) - Randy Cavanaugh
- Lethal Weapon (1987) - Cop #2
- Code Name Vengeance (1987) - Harry Applegate
- Skin Deep (1989) - Curt
- The Exorcist III (1990) - Ryan
- The Borrower (1991) - Charles Krieger
