= Sisters Love =

American R&B and funk ensemble

The Sisters Love was an American R&B and funk ensemble active in the late 1960s and early 1970s.

The Sisters Love was founded in 1968 by former members of The Raelettes. Several of Ray Charles's backing ensemble quit the band at the same time and soon afterwards organized themselves into their own vocal group.

They recorded their first single in 1968 for Los Angeles label Manchild Records and soon after signed with A&M Records. They remained on A&M for several years, appearing in the Willie Hutch-scored blaxploitation film The Mack singing the funk song "Now Is the Time". They scored a hit single in 1971 with "Are You Lonely?", written and produced by Gene Chandler, which reached #20 on the Billboard R&B charts and #108 on the Billboard Singles Chart.

In 1972, the group left A&M and signed with MoWest Records, a Motown subsidiary. They toured with the Jackson Five and had an album scheduled for release, With Love, in 1972, but this was shelved and the group disbanded in 1973; the recordings for the album remained unreleased until 2010 when Reel Music issued the album in its intended running list, along with several bonus tracks.

"Give Me Your Love", (1973) was one of the group's most successful songs, and was revived in 1980 by New York DJ Danny Krivit who released an extended eight-minute version. Give Me Your Love was also title of a 2006 singles compilation album released by Soul Jazz Records.

At Motown, the group worked with such songwriters and producers as Hal Davis, Willie Hutch and Gloria Jones. Their 1973 song "I'm Learning To Trust My Man" quickly became a Northern Soul favourite. It was reissued on Tamla Motown in 1975, two years after its original MoWest Release. The song's B-Side, "Try It, You'll Like It" (later recorded by its writer Willie Hutch) was also recorded by Marvin Gaye and is included on the deluxe edition of his album Let's Get It On.

MoWest ceased operations in Spring 1973, and the group released their last single, this time for the main Motown label, in November that year, entitled "My Love Is Yours (Till The End Of Time)".

A reformed version of Sisters Love later recorded for Ian Levine's Motown revival label Motorcity Records, releasing the single "No More Broken Hearts" in 1989. Lead singer Vermettya Royster also made solo recordings for the label, including a remake of "Give Me Your Love", released as a single in 1991. Royster later released a solo album in 2009 entitled On The Half Shell, featuring faithful re-recordings of several Sister Love tracks, as well as some original songs.

== Members ==
- Merry Clayton
- Jeannie Long
- Vermettya Royster
- Lillie Fort
- Gwen Berry
- Odia Coates
