= The Gamblers (1970 film) =

- Directed by: Ron Winston
- Screenplay by: Ron Winston
- Based on: The Gamblers by Nikolai Gogol
- Starring: Suzy Kendall; Don Gordon; Pierre Olaf
- Cinematography: Tomislav Pinter
- Edited by: Richard Bracken
- Music by: John Morris
- Release date: January 1970
- Running time: 93 minutes
- Countries: United States; Yugoslavia
- Language: English

The Gamblers is a 1970 American drama film directed by Ron Winston and starring Suzy Kendall, Don Gordon and Pierre Olaf. Its plot involves a confidence trickster who goes for a trip of a luxury cruise liner, where he is himself conned out of his money. It is loosely based on Nikolai Gogol's 1840 play The Gamblers. Its alternative title is Kockari.

== Cast ==
- Suzy Kendall – Candace
- Don Gordon – Rooney
- Pierre Olaf – Cozzier
- Kenneth Griffith – Broadfoot
- Stuart Margolin – Goldy
- Richard Woo – Koboyashi
- Massimo Serato – Del Isolla
- Faith Domergue – Signora Del Isolla
- Relja Bašić – Yakov
- Anthony Chinn – Nono

== See also ==
- List of American films of 1970
