= Foxy Brown (soundtrack) =

Soundtrack album by Willie Hutch
- Released: 1974
- Studios: Motown Recording Studios, Hollywood, California
- Genres: Soul; funk
- Length: 32:20
- Label: Motown
- Producer: Willie Hutch

Willie Hutch chronology
The Mack (1973)	Foxy Brown (1974)	The Mark of the Beast (1974)

Singles from Foxy Brown
- 1. "Theme of Foxy Brown" / "Give Me Some of That Good Old Love"; 2. "Foxy Lady" / "You Sure Know How to Love Your Man"; 3. "Chase"; 4. "Ain't That (Mellow, Mellow)"

Foxy Brown is the second soundtrack and the fifth studio album by American soul musician Willie Hutch, for the film of the same name. It was released in 1974 via Motown Records.

== Reception ==
Andrew Hamilton of AllMusic praised Hutch for "his distinctive tenor that wrung the most from each note" on "The Theme of Foxy Brown". Hamilton also praised "Give Me Some of That Good Old Love" as it "had a foot-tapping groove, tough backing vocals from Maxine Willard, Julia Tillman, and Carol Willis, and all the elements of a hit record". Meanwhile, "Out There" and Foxy Lady" was cited as nasty and contagious, albeit in a positive way. Besides that, Hamilton also cited that their most spirited performance was on "You Sure Know How To Love Your Man".

== Reissue ==
The album was reissued for the first time in 1996. It was reissued again in 2018 on standard-weight black vinyl in a faithful reproduction of the original packaging as it was released in 1974.

== Chart performance ==
The album peaked at No. 179 on the Billboard Top LPs chart and No. 36 on the Top Soul LPs chart.

== Track listing ==
All tracks are written by Willie Hutch.

Side one
No.	Title	Length
1.	"Chase"	2:30
2.	"Theme of Foxy Brown"	2:24
3.	"Overture of Foxy Brown"	0:57
4.	"Hospital Prelude of Love Theme"	2:50
5.	"Give Me Some of That Good Old Love"	3:42
6.	"Out There"	2:42

Side two
No.	Title	Length
1.	"Foxy Lady"	4:01
2.	"You Sure Know How to Love Your Man"	3:50
3.	"Have You Ever Asked Yourself Why (All About Money Game)"	3:24
4.	"Ain't That (Mellow, Mellow)"	2:57
5.	"Whatever You Do (Do It Good)"	3:03

== Personnel ==
Adapted from Discogs.

- Vocals, producer, arrangements – Willie Hutch
- Guitar – Arthur Wright, Halbert Taylor, Tim Lawson
- Backing vocals – Maxine Willard, Julia Tillman, and Carol Willis
- Keyboards – Nate Morgan
- Baritone saxophone – William Green
- Bass – Lawrence Dickens
- Drums – Abe Mills, Gene Pello
- Flute – Ernie Watts
- Saxophone – Carl Suttles
- Tenor saxophone – Bob Kee
- Trombone – George Bohanon
- Trumpet – Daniel Ackerman
- Vibraphone, tambourine – Gary Coleman
- Horns – A.D. Brisbois, Fred Jackson, Jr., Lew McCreary, Oscar Brashear, Plas Johnson
- Mixing engineer – Art Stewart
