= Z.P.G. =

- Theatrical film poster
- Directed by: Michael Campus
- Written by: Frank De Felitta; Max Ehrlich
- Produced by: Frank De Felitta; Max Ehrlich; Tom Madigan
- Starring: Oliver Reed; Geraldine Chaplin; Don Gordon; Diane Cilento
- Cinematography: Michael Reed; Mikael Salomon
- Edited by: Dennis Lanning
- Music by: Jonathan Hodge
- Production company: Sagittarius Productions + Scotia-Barber
- Distributed by: Paramount
- Release date: 25 May 1972
- Running time: 97 minutes
- Countries: England; United States
- Language: English

Z.P.G. (short for "Zero Population Growth") is a 1972 British-American dystopian science fiction film directed by Michael Campus and starring Oliver Reed and Geraldine Chaplin. It was inspired by the best-selling 1968 non-fiction book The Population Bomb, by Paul R. Ehrlich. The film concerns an overpopulated future Earth whose world government executes those who violate a 30-year ban on having children. Filmed in Denmark, the film is almost entirely set-bound featuring art direction designed to reflect a bleak, oppressive future.

== Plot ==
In the future, the Earth has become severely polluted (people need to wear breathing masks when outside), with severe overpopulation affecting available resources. Because of the permanent thick smog that has settled over the dismal cities that now cover the Earth's entire surface, all animals – even common household pets – are extinct. People eat tasteless, bright-colored paste out of plastic containers. To reduce the world's population, the world's government decrees that no children may be born for the next 30 years. Breaking this law will result in the death penalty for the parents as well as the newborn. Brainwashing and robot substitutes are used to end the yearning for children, with the death penalty as the ultimate deterrent. Violators are executed by suffocation under a plastic dome. Couples of fertile age visit "Babyland" and are given life-size animatronic children instead.

Russ and Carol McNeil work in a museum recreating life in the 20th century. Carol is desperate for a child, so when she conceives, she avoids the abortion machine installed in their bathroom to remain pregnant. After the child's birth, the couple must shield the baby from being discovered. Once Carol decides to break the law and have a baby, they must not only avoid the prying eyes of the Big Brother-like government but also the growing jealousy of their own friends. Neighbors finding a couple with a real child will go into the streets screaming "baby, baby", until authorities show up.

When neighbours George and Edna Borden find out about the baby, their initial offer to help conceal the baby quickly leads to trouble. Jealousy and envy arise as the Bordens want to share the baby as if it is a new car. The McNeils and the Bordens begin to fight over the baby, and the Bordens then seek to keep the child for themselves. Finally, the McNeils are captured and placed under one of the state's execution domes, but the couple, along with the baby, manage to escape by digging underground, making their way through darkened tunnels in a raft to a remote island where there is no visible pollution. However, the whole island may still be in a radioactive state, as it was used to bury old nuclear missiles in 1978.

== Cast ==
- Oliver Reed as Russ McNeil
- Geraldine Chaplin as Carol McNeil
- Don Gordon as George Borden
- Diane Cilento as Edna Borden
- David Markham as Doctor Herrick
- Bill Nagy as The President
- Sheila Reid as Mary Herrick
- Aubrey Woods as Doctor Mallory
- Wayne Rodda as Metromart Salesman
- Ditte Maria Wiberg as Telescreen Operator
- Birgitte Federspiel as Psychiatrist

== Production ==
Michael Campus was a television documentary maker who had moved into features with the improvised feature Survival (1970). The film was based on an original screenplay and was originally called The First of January. It was from Sagittarious Productions, the company of Edgar Bronfman Jr. Bronfman was impressed by Survival and hired Campus to direct.

Filming took place in Copenhagen in March 1971. Campus recalled:

Oliver was amazing. He was so talented, and yet he'd stay up all night, every night. He was the ultimate party machine. He would roll onto the set and stay in his room, sleeping the last night off. Yet, when I said, "Oliver, I really need you," he would get into it. He was strongest at the end of the day, after he'd had his naps, and then he'd take off at night and do it all over again.

== Novelization ==
The film was made from an original screenplay by Frank De Felitta and Max Ehrlich, inspired by Paul Ehrlich's The Population Bomb. A year prior to the film's release, Max Ehrlich published the science fiction novel The Edict, based on the screenplay.

In the novel, the earth's resources have been strained to the limit, and in many parts of the world, cannibalism and food riots are commonplace. Seeking a solution to this crisis, the leaders of WorldGov meet in emergency session. Their computers spin through billions of facts, and the reports are more than disquieting; they are chilling. Further growth of the population is unthinkable, and the leaders finally settle on the only possible solution, which is soon announced by the World Government satellite:

All citizens stand by. This is an edict from WorldGov. In the interest of balancing the population, and preserving the food supply, the birth of any baby is forbidden for the next thirty years. Any man and woman who conceive and have a child during that period will be put to death by the State. Any child conceived will be considered an outlaw child, and will also be liquidated. There will be constant surveillance by StatePol and a large reward in extra calories for any citizen who reports the presence of an outlaw child. That is all.

To give the world some semblance of normality, realistic mechanical babies are devised to pacify the maternal instincts of 10 billion women. But to Carol, the very idea of accepting one of the robot infants is abhorrent. She wants and needs a real child, and this slowly becomes an obsession.

== Special effects ==
Derek Meddings created the life-size realistic animatronic children for the film.

== Awards ==
Geraldine Chaplin won Best Actress at the 1972 Sitges Film Festival for her performance.

== See also ==
- Survival film, about the film genre, with a list of related films
