= Can't Rely on You =

Single by Paloma Faith

from the album A Perfect Contradiction
- Released: 23 February 2014
- Recorded: 2013
- Genre: Funk; soul
- Length: 3:19
- Label: RCA
- Songwriters: Paloma Faith; Pharrell Williams
- Producer: Pharrell Williams

Paloma Faith singles chronology
"Black & Blue" (2013)	"Can't Rely on You" (2014)	"Only Love Can Hurt Like This" (2014)

Music video
- "Can't Rely on You" on YouTube

"Can't Rely on You" is a song by English singer Paloma Faith, written by Faith and American singer and producer Pharrell Williams. The single, available for purchase from 23 February 2014, serves as the lead single from her third studio album, A Perfect Contradiction, which was released in early March.

It has received some radio airplay, and during the last week in January it joined BBC Radio 6 Music's rotation list on the 'B' list. She also performed it on The Graham Norton Show on 14 February 2014.

== Background ==
For her third studio album, Faith wanted to produce a more upbeat album, returning to her soul-girl roots. In May 2013, Faith met Pharrell Williams at the Metropolitan Museum of Art Met Ball in New York City, when Williams approached Faith singing her song, "New York". He then took her phone, entered his contact number and told her, "I'm ready to work." The pair went on to later write and record "Can't Rely on You" together in Miami.

== Composition ==
"Can't Rely on You" is a funk-soul track, featuring looped funk beats and growly vocals. The single was produced by Pharrell Williams and mixes the trademark beats of Williams with the distinctive soulful vocals of Faith, bringing a grooving backdrop to the singer's soulful rebuke.

== Critical reception ==
Critics were quick to draw comparisons to Robin Thicke's "Blurred Lines", which was also produced by Williams, due to its similar beat. However, Sam Lansky of Idolator insisted that this was not necessarily a bad thing, instead calling it an "improvement" on "Thicke's sticky falsetto and problematic lyrical content", describing it as "'Blurred Lines' with soulful female vocals, singing better lyrics."

Tim Chipping of Holy Moly gave a negative review, labelling the song as "a record that sounds like a thing Beyoncé would do (and then leave off the album)", going on to say: "It's impressive and everything. But it's not, you know, got a tune. Or a chorus." Chris DeVille writing for Stereogum was similarly negative, calling it a "post-"Blurred Lines" bluster" and later concluding, "Hopefully he’s saving his good stuff for Pusha or himself."

== Music video ==
The music video contrasts the retro flavour of the song with lushly anachronistic visuals. Faith is seen in a variety of guises with several different men, each considered unreliable. A series of melancholy Italian voice-overs narrate the clips, the first of which sees Faith lingerie-clad, stroking a bare-chested man in bed with the spoken Italian stating: "Everybody leaves. People come and go. Don’t worry. Love is loss and loss in love. The space that was you will be filled. Your lines will be read by someone else. They just might not sound as good. But when the curtain rises, I’ll be standing there facing the crowd." The video ends with the words (again, in Italian): "This is just a beginning." The video won the "Best Colour Grade Award" at the 2014 UKMVA's.

== Charts and certifications ==
=== Weekly charts ===
Weekly chart performance for "Can't Rely on You"
Chart (2014)	Peak position
Australia (ARIA)	64
Belgium (Ultratop 50 Flanders)	18
Belgium Dance (Ultratop Flanders)	16
Belgium Urban (Ultratop Flanders)	2
Belgium Dance Bubbling Under (Ultratop Wallonia)	12
Croatia (HRT)	14
Finland (Suomen virallinen latauslista)	21
Hungary (Rádiós Top 40)	37
Iceland (RÚV)	12
Ireland (IRMA)	5
Netherlands (Single Top 100)	53
New Zealand (Recorded Music NZ)	34
Scotland Singles (OCC)	12
South Korea (Gaon International Chart)	103
UK Singles (OCC)	10

=== Year-end charts ===
Year-end chart performance for "Can't Rely on You"
Chart (2014)	Rank
Belgium (Ultratop 50 Flanders)	95
Belgium Urban (Ultratop)	16

=== Certifications ===
Certifications for "Can't Rely on You"
Region	Certification	Certified units/sales
United Kingdom (BPI)	Silver	200,000^{‡}
^{‡} Sales+streaming figures based on certification alone.

== Release history ==
Release history for "Can't Rely on You"
Region	Date	Format	Ref.
United Kingdom	23 February 2014	CD; digital download	
