= Ready for the Good Life =

Single by Paloma Faith

from the album A Perfect Contradiction (Outsiders' Edition)
- Released: 7 November 2014
- Length: 3:25
- Label: Sony; RCA
- Songwriters: Paloma Faith; Klas Åhlund; Adam Baptiste; Måns Wredenberg; Linus Wiklund
- Producer: Klas Åhlund

Paloma Faith singles chronology
"Changing" (2014)	"Ready for the Good Life" (2014)	"Leave While I'm Not Looking" (2014)

Audio video
- "Ready for the Good Life" on YouTube

"Ready for the Good Life" is a song by English singer Paloma Faith. It was released on 7 November 2014 as the fourth single to promote her third studio album, A Perfect Contradiction (2014). The song was written by Faith, Klas Åhlund, Adam Baptiste, Måns Wredenberg, Linus Wiklund. Production of the song was handled by Åhlund. No music video was made for the single.

Faith has performed the single on Jools' Annual Hootenanny, and during the Paloma Faith Autumn Tour 2014. The song was also featured on the soundtrack for the Absolutely Fabulous: The Movie.

== Charts ==
Chart (2014–15)	Peak position
UK Singles (OCC)	68
Scotland Singles (OCC)	46

== Release history ==
Country	Date	Format	Ref.
United Kingdom	7 November 2014	Digital download	
