= Picking Up the Pieces (Paloma Faith song) =

Single by Paloma Faith

from the album Fall to Grace
- Released: 18 May 2012
- Length: 4:04 (album version); 3:34 (radio edit)
- Label: RCA
- Songwriters: Paloma Faith; Wayne Hector; Tim Powell
- Producer: Nellee Hooper

Paloma Faith singles chronology
"Smoke & Mirrors" (2010)	"Picking Up the Pieces" (2012)	"30 Minute Love Affair" (2012)

Music video
- "Picking Up the Pieces" on YouTube

"Picking Up the Pieces" is a song by English recording artist Paloma Faith from her second studio album Fall to Grace. Produced by Nellee Hooper and written by Faith, Wayne Hector and Tim Powell, it was released as the album's first single on 18 May 2012. Faith revealed "Picking Up the Pieces" was inspired by the issues and insecurity of dating someone who is recovering from a previous relationship. The artwork for the single was revealed on 5 April 2012.

"Picking Up the Pieces" entered the UK Singles Chart at number 7, making it Faith's first Top 10 single and her highest charting single in the UK until "Only Love Can Hurt Like This" (2014) peaked at number 6. Critical reception of the song has been positive. The song's accompanying music video was directed by Emil Nava and it was released on 12 April 2012. The video features Faith portraying a woman who is in "a tempestuous relationship" with her boyfriend. As the video progresses it shows Faith's relationship with her boyfriend crumbling and she becomes wax-like and melts.

== Background and artwork ==
In March 2010, Faith revealed that she was working on a second album. During an interview with a Popjustice reporter, she explained the album would contain more "agony and suffering." Faith enlisted record producer Nellee Hooper to work with her on the project. Hooper told a writer for NME that he had not really heard of Faith as he was living in Los Angeles when her first album was released. He said Sony and RCA Records contacted him and suggested he meet Faith. Faith wrote and recorded Fall To Grace in London. On 29 February 2012, it was announced "Picking Up the Pieces" would serve as the first single from the album. Faith described the song as being about "...the issues of being in a relationship with someone who is still recovering from a previous relationship with another person. It is a song about self-doubt and insecurity". She added that she was excited to introduce her new sound to the world. Co-written by Faith, Wayne Hector and Tim Powell, "Picking Up the Pieces" was released in the UK by RCA Records on 20 May 2012. The cover art for the single was released exclusively on the Digital Spy website on 5 April. The cover shows Faith dressed in a couture, full-length Dolce & Gabbana dress, wrapped up in a faux fur stole by seamstress Wendy Benstead. The image is completely un-retouched.

== Critical reception ==
"Picking Up the Pieces" has received generally positive reviews from critics. Colin Gentry of 4Music said "Picking Up the Pieces" is "a classy, pacey song of trying to compete with a lover's ex-girlfriend. It's hard to imagine anyone putting our Paloma in the shade, and her pained vocals certainly belt out loud enough for everyone to hear her angst." Digital Spy's Robert Copsey and Lewis Corner thought the single was "an anthemic trailer of sweeping strings and relentless drums", which felt "as intimate" as Faith's previous work. In his official review, Corner gave "Picking Up the Pieces" five stars and stated Faith "may not think she's able to obtain the prime ideal of perfection, but 'Picking Up The Pieces' skirts dangerously close – and for that alone, it's more than worthy of some global recognition." Tim Ingham of Music Week branded the track a "thumping thick-skinned anthem". While BBC News entertainment reporter Mark Savage called it "a strident, string-laden 'mega-ballad'".

So So Gay's Leo Kristoffersson said the song's lyrics "are delivered with Faith's characteristically affirmative vocals". He added "The smoky, jazz-tinged vocal style we have become accustomed to are slightly sharper on the track, which reflects the angst that inspired the track perfectly. We predict big things for this track." During his review of the album, BBC Music's Nick Levine wrote "Lead single 'Picking Up the Pieces' is epic, like stallions galloping across the silver screen". David of We Love Pop magazines gave the single a mixed review. He said "Picking Up the Pieces" was "predictable but strong". He added "We enjoy pop stars that are both a little bit bonkers and are in charge of their own careers; Paloma is both but this song doesn't fully showcase the brilliant pop star she could be."

== Chart performance ==
On the Irish Singles Chart, "Picking Up the Pieces" debuted at number 82 for the week ending 24 May 2012. It rose two places the following week, before reaching number 77. The single then hit a peak of 13 for the week ending 22 June 2012. "Picking Up the Pieces" debuted at number 7 on the UK Singles Chart for the week ending 2 June 2012, selling 32,607 copies. This made "Picking Up the Pieces" Faith's first Top 10 single. The following week, the single fell five places. For its third week in the chart, "Picking Up the Pieces" remained inside the top twenty at number nineteen. It later rose to number fourteen and then number ten during its fifth week on the chart. "Picking Up the Pieces" entered the Scottish Singles Chart at number 3.

== Music video ==
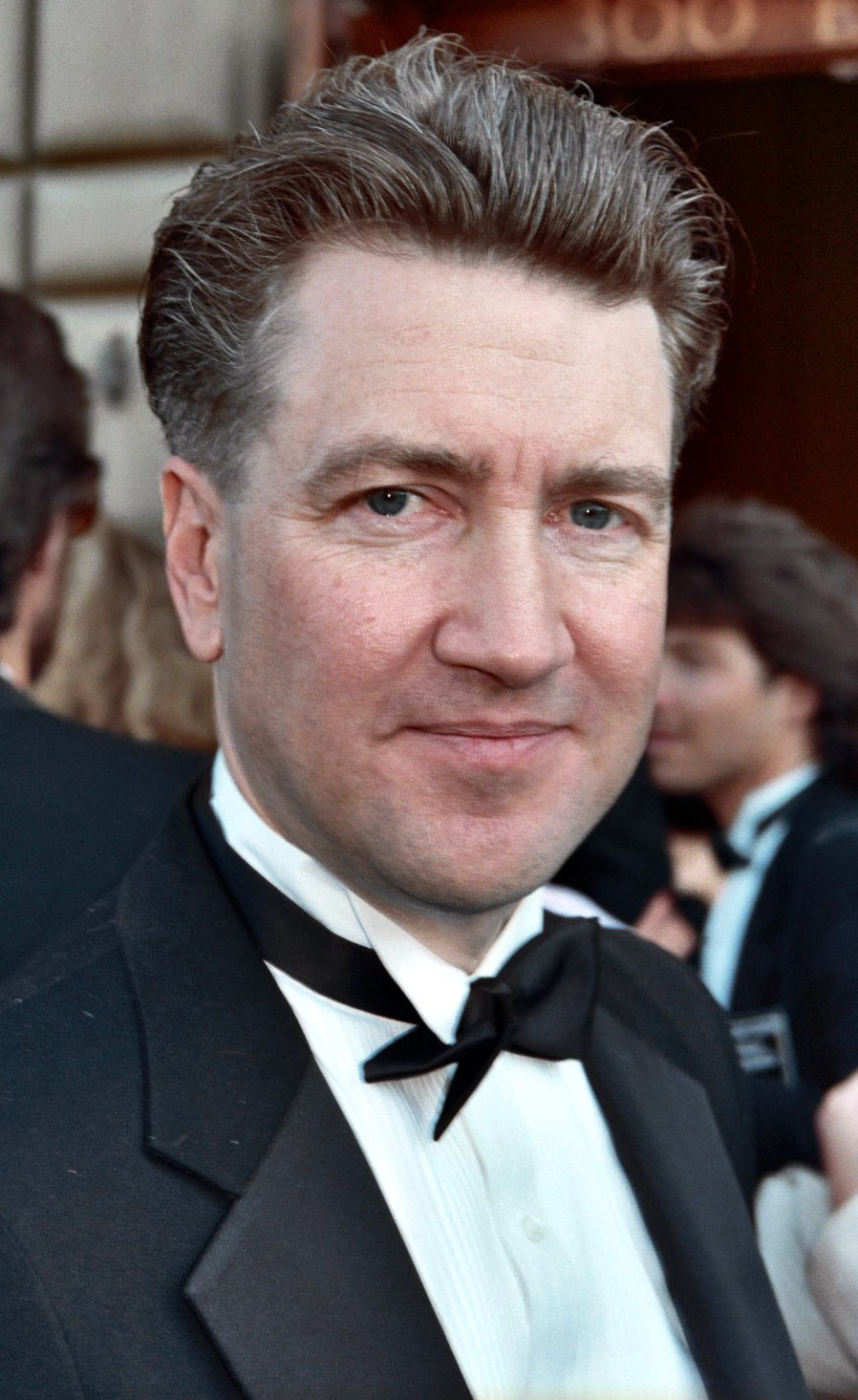
Faith revealed the video for "Picking Up the Pieces" was partly inspired by David Lynch and his television drama Twin Peaks

The accompanying music video, directed by Emil Nava, was released on 12 April 2012. Faith portrays a woman who is stuck in "a tempestuous relationship with a possessive boyfriend." The couple go to a country hotel where they are surrounded by wealthy guests, who appear to be enjoying themselves. As the video progresses it shows Faith's relationship with her boyfriend crumbling. Of the concept, Faith commented:

"The idea is that we've just broken up and we're both very upset. He's sort of besotted by this other version of me who represents perfection. He's in love with perfection, but the perfection doesn't actually exist – it's like the perfection that I've imagined in my own paranoid, self-loathing way."

Faith then becomes wax-like and she begins to melt, which Lewis Corner of Digital Spy described as resembling "the emotional crumbling she has suffered through domestic abuse." Faith told Corner's colleague Robert Copsey that the scene in which she melts shows that her character is not real and that what she was imagining does not even exist. She added "We have this kiss at the end that signifies that we just had a blip. I think that happens a lot in relationships." While the story plays out, Faith is seen singing in the grounds of the hotel. The singer revealed that the setting for the video was inspired by Twin Peaks, 2046, The Shining and David Lynch.

Louisa Walker of 4Music said the video shows off Faith's "love of 20th century-inspired style". She added "Paloma has said that 'The new album has taken on a very cinematic mood,' and this is evident in this story-led video for the lead single." A Popjustice writer called the video "great" and quipped "It makes the song seem about 150% better than it actually is. Maybe it just makes you realise how good the song actually is." They added that the video has some nice clothes featured in it. The video for "Picking Up the Pieces" was nominated for 4Music's Best Video Of 2012 and Best Pop Video at the UK Music Video Awards.

== Live performances ==
On 19 May 2012, Faith performed "Picking Up the Pieces" live on T4. She also performed the track during the fourth results show of The Voice UK. On 30 May 2012, Faith talked about and performed "Picking Up the Pieces" live on This Morning. "Picking Up the Pieces" was performed by Faith on The Graham Norton Show on 15 June. Faith included "Picking Up the Pieces" in her set for her live performances at Somerset House on 17 and 18 July.

== Track listing ==
- Digital download
1. "Picking Up the Pieces" (Radio edit) – 3:34
- Digital EP
1. "Picking Up the Pieces" (Radio edit) – 3:34
2. "Picking Up the Pieces" (Acoustic version) – 3:45
3. "Picking Up the Pieces" (RackNRuin Remix) – 4:11
4. "Picking Up the Pieces" (Moto Blanco Club Mix) – 8:20

== Credits and personnel ==
Credits were adapted from Fall to Grace album liner notes.

- Paloma Faith – vocals, songwriter
- Wayne Hector – songwriter
- Tim Powell – songwriter, strings
- Nellee Hooper – producer, mixer, keyboards, drums
- Jake Gosling – co-producer, keyboards, drums
- Dave Miles – audio engineering
- Andy Hughes – audio engineering
- Simon Gogerly – Mix engineer
- Urban Voices Choir – Choir
- Peter Honore – Guitar

== Charts ==
=== Weekly charts ===
"Picking Up the Pieces" weekly chart performance
Chart (2012–2013)	Peak position
Ireland (IRMA)	13
New Zealand (Recorded Music NZ)	30
Scottish Singles Sales (Official Charts)	3
UK Singles (Official Charts)	7
UK Audio Streaming (Official Charts)	16
US Adult Pop Airplay (Billboard)	39
US Dance Club Songs (Billboard)	8

=== Year-end charts ===
"Picking Up the Pieces" year-end chart performance
Chart (2012)	Position
UK Singles (OCC)	74

== Certifications ==
"Picking Up the Pieces" certifications
Region	Certification	Certified units/sales
United Kingdom (BPI)	Platinum	600,000^{‡}
^{‡} Sales+streaming figures based on certification alone.

== Release history ==
"Picking Up the Pieces" release history
Country	Date	Format	Label	Ref.
France	18 May 2012	Digital download; digital EP	RCA	
Ireland	18 May 2012	Digital download; digital EP	RCA	
United Kingdom	20 May 2012	Digital download; digital EP	RCA	
United States	14 August 2012	Digital download	RCA	

== Cover versions ==
In 2013, The Voice UK contestant Mike Ward performed the song during the competition. A studio version of his performance was released and peaked at number 72 in the UK Singles Chart.

"Picking Up the Pieces" by Mike Ward chart performance
Chart (2013)	Peak position
UK Singles (OCC)	72
