= Anthony Chinn =

Guyanese actor (1930–2000)

- in The Protectors ep: See No Evil (1972)
- Born: 1930; Georgetown, Guyana
- Died: 22 October 2000 (aged 69–70); London, England
- Citizenship: British
- Occupation: Actor
- Years active: 1957–2000
- Children: 4

Anthony Chinn (1930 – 22 October 2000) was a Guyanese actor based in England who appeared in over 50 films and television series throughout a career which spanned more than four decades.

== Career and death ==
Chinn was born in Georgetown, Guyana. He made his film début in the United Kingdom in 1957. He moved to London in 1961 and for the next several years appeared in British TV series such as The Avengers, Danger Man, The Protectors and Steptoe and Son, as well as two episodes of UFO.

Chinn also had early uncredited roles in the James Bond films Dr. No (1962), Goldfinger (1964) and You Only Live Twice (1967), later playing a Taiwanese businessman in A View to a Kill (1985). Chinn played the Kitai in John Huston's The Kremlin Letter (1969), a Chinese assassin in The Pink Panther Strikes Again (1976) and a Chinese doorman in Revenge of the Pink Panther (1978). He appeared as Mohan in Raiders of the Lost Ark (1981) and as Mactilburgh's technician in The Fifth Element (1997).

Chinn also worked in theatre and appeared in TV advertisements for brands such as McEwan's beer. He was hospitalised with a serious and life threatening brain bleed on 21 October 2000 and died from the haemorrhage the next day at a London hospital. The Guyanese actor was buried in North London and was survived by his four sons and two grandchildren.

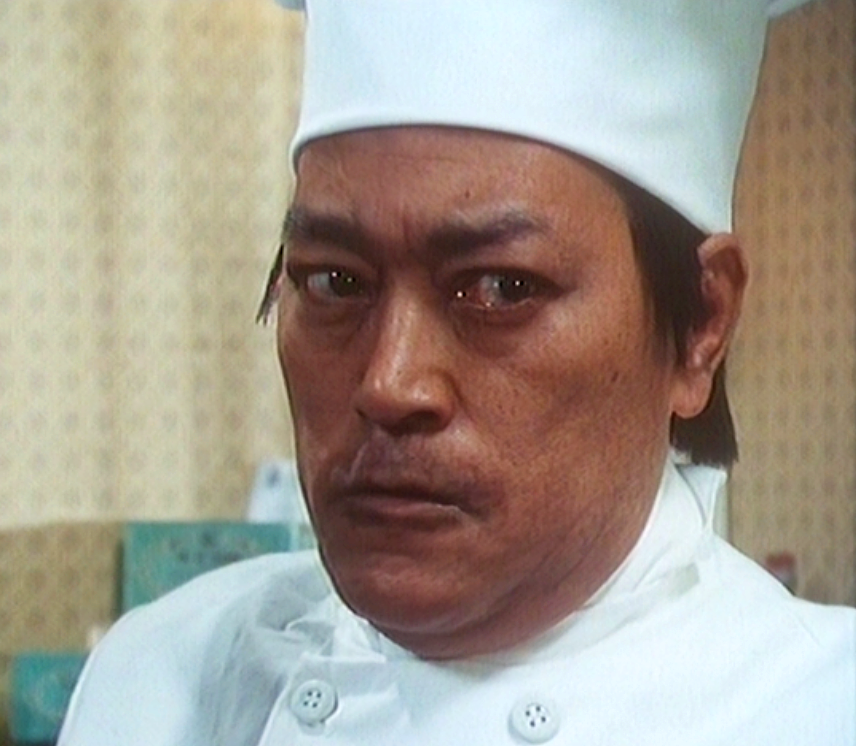
Chinn in an episode of The Optimist, 1984

== Selected filmography ==
- Yangtse Incident: The Story of H.M.S. Amethyst (1957) - Chinese People's Liberation Army Officer
- The Abominable Snowman (1957) - Majordomo
- The Camp on Blood Island (1958) - Japanese Sentry (uncredited)
- Next to No Time (1958)
- The Savage Innocents (1960) - Kiddok
- The Long and the Short and the Tall (1961) - Japanese Sniper (uncredited)
- Satan Never Sleeps (1962) - Ho San's Driver (uncredited)
- Dr. No (1962) - Chen, Descontamination Technician (uncredited)
- Tarzan's Three Challenges (1963) - Tor
- Goldfinger (1964) - Servant at Stud Farm (uncredited)
- A Countess from Hong Kong (1967) - Hawaiian
- You Only Live Twice (1967) - SPECTRE Guard (uncredited)
- Pretty Polly (1967) - Japanese Proprietor
- The Chairman (1969) - Chinese Officer
- Doppelgänger (1969) - Mongolian Rescue Crew Member (uncredited)
- The Gamblers (1970) - Nono
- The Kremlin Letter (1970) - Kitai
- Craze (1974) - Customer (uncredited)
- Rollerball (1975) - Reporter (uncredited)
- The Pink Panther Strikes Again (1976) - Chinese Assassin
- Revenge of the Pink Panther (1978) - Chinese Doorman
- Mihail, câine de circ (1979)
- Raiders of the Lost Ark (1981) - Mohan
- High Road to China (1983) - General Wong
- The Optimist (1984) - Chinese spy
- A View to a Kill (1985) - Taiwanese Tycoon
- The Fifth Element (1997) - Mactilburgh's Technician
