= The Mack (soundtrack) =

Soundtrack album by Willie Hutch
- Released: 1973
- Studio: MoWest (Hollywood, California)
- Genre: Soul, funk, proto-disco
- Length: 37:10
- Label: Motown
- Producer: Willie Hutch

Willie Hutch chronology
Fully Exposed (1973)	The Mack (1973)	Foxy Brown (1974)

Singles from The Mack
- 1. "Brother's Gonna Work It Out" Released: 1973; 2. "Slick" Released: 1973

The Mack is the first soundtrack and fourth album by singer Willie Hutch released on the Motown label. It is the soundtrack of the 1973 film The Mack.

== Reception ==
Professional ratings
Review scores
Source	Rating
AllMusic	4.5/5 stars

Ron Wynn from AllMusic stated, "When an act called Sisters Love were offered a cameo in the blaxploitation film The Mack, their manager suggested that Willie Hutch do the soundtrack. It came to be one of the great 1970s film scores, including a pair of classic funk tunes, 'Brother's Gonna Work It Out' and the title cut."

On May 5, 1973, the song from the soundtrack, Brother's Gonna Work It Out, first appeared at No. 47 on the Hot Soul Singles chart. It peaked at No. 18, on June 21, 1973, as reported from Jet. On September 15, 1973, Slick, appeared at No. 65 on the same chart, as it did on August 25, 1973, at No. 81, and on September 1, 1973, at the same position. On September 22, 1973, it peaked at No. 23 on the same chart the next week shortly after peaking at No. 65.

== Track listing ==
Side one
No.	Title	Length
1.	"Vampin'"	2:45
2.	"Theme of the Mack"	5:36
3.	"I Choose You"	3:42
4.	"Mack's Stroll / The Getaway (Chase Scene)"	3:08

Side two
No.	Title	Length
5.	"Slick"	3:36
6.	"Mack Man (Got to Get Over)"	5:10
7.	"Mother's Theme (Mama)"	3:56
8.	"Now That It's All Over"	4:31
9.	"Brother's Gonna Work It Out"	4:46

== Personnel ==
Adapted from Discogs.com.

- Arranged By – Willie Hutch
- Backing Vocals – Carolyn Willis, Julia Waters Tillman, Maxine Waters Willard
- Bass – Wilton Felder
- Congas – Bobye Hall
- Drums – Edward Green
- Engineer – Arthur Stewart, Calvin Harris
- Guitar – David T. Walker, Weldon Dean Parks, Louie Shaldon, Willie Hutch
- Horns – A.D. Brisbois, George Bohanon, Joseph Kelson Jr., Keneth Shruyer, Paul Hubinon, Plass Johnson, William Green
- Horns, Strings – Ernest Watts
- Percussion – Jene Estes
- Performer – Willie Hutch
- Photography By – Jim Britt
- Piano, Clavinet, Organ – Clarence McDonald
- Producer – Willie Hutch
- Strings – Arnold Belnick, Assa Drori, Denzil Lauchton, Douglas Davis, Frederic Seykora, Gareth Nuttycolbe, Gail Vevant, Jerald Vinci*, Israel Baker, Jack Shulman, Jacob Krachmalnick, Lou Raderman, Myron Sandler, Paul Bergstrom, Paul Shure, Henry Ruth, Samuel Boghossian

== Charts ==
Year	Album	Chart positions	
Year	Album	US	US R&B
1973	The Mack	114	17

=== Singles ===
Year	Single	Chart positions	
Year	Single	US	US R&B
1973	"Brother's Gonna Work It Out"	67	18
1973	"Slick"	65	18
