= Michael Campus =

American film director

- Born: March 28, 1935; Manhattan, New York City, New York, United States
- Died: May 15, 2015 (aged 80); Encino, California, United States
- Occupations: Film director, screenwriter, producer
- Years active: 1966–2015
- Spouse: Pamela Hobbs Campus

Michael Campus (March 28, 1935 – May 15, 2015) was an American director, screenwriter and producer. He is best known for directing the 1973 film The Mack. He died on May 15, 2015, at his home in Encino, California of melanoma.

== Filmography ==
- Survival (filmed 1970)
- Z.P.G. (1972)
- The Mack (1973)
- The Education of Sonny Carson (1974)
- The Passover Plot (1976)
- Christmas Cottage (2008)
