= Kyle Townsend =

- Born: Kyle Dwayne Townsend; September 21, 1978 (age 47)
- Origin: Seattle, Washington, United States
- Genres: Hip Hop, R&B, Rap, Soul, Classical
- Occupations: Record producer, musician, composer, songwriter
- Instruments: Piano, Organ, Guitar, Drums, Sampler, Bass
- Years active: 2003–present
- Website: www.kyletownsend.com

Kyle Townsend (born September 21, 1978) is an American record producer, songwriter, and composer. He has produced songs for such acclaimed recording artists as 5-time GRAMMY Award winner Celine Dion, 10-time Academy Award-nominated songwriter Diane Warren, as well as Mary J Blige, Lady Gaga, Jessie J, Andra Day, and Academy Award winner Jennifer Hudson. He has produced 3 Academy Award nominated songs, and his work has earned an additional 3 Grammy Award Nominations. He scored the Emmy Award nominated Showtime documentary "The One and Only Dick Gregory."

== Early life ==
Kyle Townsend was raised in the Central District neighborhood of Seattle Washington on historic Jackson Street. This neighborhood was once home to legendary musicians Ray Charles, Quincy Jones, and Jimi Hendrix. He was introduced to music by his mother, who was a minister and also served as choir director at the church his family attended. He began piano by ear at age 6 and was installed as organist at his church at age 7. He was mentored by other church musicians from the greater Seattle area, and at the early age of 11 he performed with GRAMMY Award-winning gospel recording artist, Reverend Timothy Wright. Not yet in his teens, he was frequently hired to play at weddings and other church events in and around the city. Later, his focus would turn to production during a chance encounter at a local instrument store near Seattle, as he watched a customer making a track on a keyboard workstation. Inspired, he says "Even though I had been a musician all my life, that was the moment I decided to be a producer. It happened in an instant." Within a year, he would be in Los Angeles pursuing a career in music. He is a graduate of Kent-Meridian High School

== Production ==
Townsend has produced records for a broad range of popular recording artists including Celine Dion, Mary J. Blige, Jennifer Hudson, Ariana Grande, Fifth Harmony, Andra Day, Common, LL Cool J, Snoop Dogg, Paloma Faith, The Veronicas, Diane Warren, David Foster, among many others.

He produced the title song for the 8-time Academy Award-nominated film Silver Linings Playbook along with Grammy Award-winning producer Rodney Jerkins. The song, "Silver Lining (Crazy Bout You)" earned a Grammy Award nomination for" Best Song for Visual Media." In 2014 he produced the single "The Good Good" for Snoop Dogg on his reggae-inspired "Reincarnated (album)" album, which earned a Grammy Award nomination for Best Reggae Album. He produced Celine Dion's Unfinished Song", which appeared on her 2013 album "Loved Me Back to Life." Townsend vocal produced on the 2014 international hit "Only Love Can Hurt Like This" by Paloma Faith, who won the Brit Award for Best Female Solo Artist in 2015. He vocal produced on the song This is For My Girls released March 15, 2016 by First Lady Michelle Obama. The song features vocals from Clarkson, Janelle Monáe, Kelly Rowland, Lea Michele, Zendaya and Missy Elliott to coincide with Barack Obama's SXSW speech and to promote the third-world educational initiative "Let Girls Learn". In 2015 Townsend produced music for the live broadcast of the 87th Academy Awards ceremony for the performance of the "Best Song nominee" "Grateful" by Rita Ora. Townsend produced the theme song for the 20th Season of ABC's longtime running daytime talk show "The View", performed by Mary J. Blige. In 2017 The film Marshall was released, featuring the title song "Stand Up for Something" produced by Kyle Townsend. The song, performed by Andra Day featuring Common, earned wide critical praise and recognition, including the Grammy Award, and the Academy Award for Best Song.

== Influences ==
Townsend has cited musicians including Quincy Jones, Kurt Cobain, Phil Spector, John P. Kee, Michael Jackson, Kirk Franklin, Raphael Saadiq, Rodney Jerkins, Hans Zimmer, John Williams, Jerry Wexler, Irving Berlin, Nat King Cole, Jermone Kern, Pharrell Williams, Teddy Riley, The Gershwin Brothers, Prince, Dr. Dre, Just Blaze, Rick Rubin, Swizz Beats, and David Foster with having considerable impact on his evolution as a musician and producer.

== Filmography ==
Films featuring title songs produced by / original score by Kyle Townsend:

- 2023 – Average Joe (BET+ Original Series) Original Score by Kyle Townsend
- 2023 – The Knife Original Score by Kyle Townsend
- 2022 – The D.O.C Original Score by Kyle Townsend
- 2021 – The One and Only Dick Gregory Original Score by Kyle Townsend
- 2020 – The Night Clerk ("Statue") Performed by Stanaj
- 2019 – Breakthrough (I'm Standing With You) Performed by Chrissy Metz
- 2017 – Marshal (film) (Stand Up for Something) Performed by Andra Day featuring Common -- Academy Award Nominee "Best Song"
- 2015 – The Hunting Ground ("Till It Happens To You Performed by Lady Gaga (Music Video Score) )
- 2015 – Miss You Already
- 2012 – Silver Linings Playbook (Silver Lining—Crazy Bout' You, Performed by Jessie J.) -- Grammy Award Nominee "Best Song For Visual Media"
- 2012 – The Sapphires ("Get Used to Me" Performed by Jessica Mauboy)
- 2012 – Song for Marion ("Unfinished Songs" Performed by Celine Dion)
- 2011 – Winnie Mandela ("Bleed For Love" Performed by Jennifer Hudson)
