= 30 Minute Love Affair =

Single by Paloma Faith

from the album Fall to Grace
- Released: August 10, 2012
- Recorded: 2011
- Genre: Synth-pop
- Length: 3:19
- Label: RCA
- Songwriters: Paloma Faith; Chris Braide
- Producer: Nellee Hooper

Paloma Faith singles chronology
| "Picking Up the Pieces" (2012) | "30 Minute Love Affair" (2012) | "Never Tear Us Apart" (2012) |

Music video
- "30 Minute Love Affair" on YouTube

"30 Minute Love Affair" is a song performed by English recording artist Paloma Faith. It was released on 10 August 2012, by RCA Records, as the second single from her second studio album Fall to Grace (2012). The song was written by Faith and Chris Braide, while Nellee Hooper produced it. Faith explained that the concept of the song is based on a real-life encounter she had with a busker when she was fourteen. The singer said that she wanted the song to have a similar feel of freedom and escape that the 2011 film Drive evokes.

The artwork for the song was released on 3 July 2012. The music video, which was directed by Emil Nava and filmed at the Clapham Grand, was released on 9 July. It shows Faith performing "30 Minute Love Affair" in a Soho strip club and enjoying a brief relationship with another man, following an argument with her boyfriend. "30 Minute Love Affair" has received mostly positive attention from critics and it reached a peak position of number 50 on the UK Singles Chart.

== Background ==
On 3 July 2012, Faith announced that "30 Minute Love Affair" would serve as the second single from her second studio album Fall to Grace. Co-written by Faith and Chris Braide and produced by Nellee Hooper, the track was released in the UK by RCA Records on 12 August 2012. "30 Minute Love Affair" is based on a real-life encounter Faith had with a busker in Leicester Square when she was fourteen. The singer explained "I asked him if he'd be there the next day and he said he would. When I went back he was gone, and I've never forgotten it." Faith commented during a behind the scenes video that it was sometimes better if you did not get to know certain people that you have a fleeting moment with because then they stay perfect in your memory, which they might not do if you get to know them.

Faith stated that the single was "a definite nod" to the soundtrack of the 2011 film, Drive. She wanted to give the song the same type of "80's road movie" feel and "a sense of freedom and escape" that the film evokes. The artwork for the song was also revealed on 3 July. It shows Faith in a blue Bernard Chandran long sleeve lace dress about to kiss a man.

== Reception ==
=== Critical response ===
"30 Minute Love Affair" received mostly positive reviews. Robert Copsey from Digital Spy included "30 Minute Love Affair" in the website's "10 tracks you need to hear" playlist. Copsey commented "The blend of Faith's soul-drenched vocals with buzzing '80s synths results in a Cyndi Lauper-meets-Drive number". During his official review of the single, Copsey gave it four out of five stars and stated "You'd be forgiven for thinking that she [Faith] was alluding to something much seedier than she really is, particularly given the setting of Soho's red-light district for the accompanying music video. Fortunately, further investigation quickly tells otherwise." Colin Gentry of 4Music said "After the string-heavy heartbreak of 'Picking Up the Pieces', Paloma Faith has changed tack with her new single. '30 Minute Love Affair' is a love song about a fleeting romance, with more than a ring of Adele about it."

John Dingwall, writing for the Daily Record, said "A superb soul effort backed by the sort of synth work that wouldn't be out of place on an early Depeche Mode pop effort rekindled by Stock, Aitken & Waterman." A reporter for the Sunday Mail quipped that the track is "a powerful little number". While Nick Levine from the BBC called the song "Annie Lennox-style synth-pop." During her review of Fall to Grace, Contactmusic.com's Hayley Avron proclaimed "'30 Minute Love Affair' is possibly the worst offender. The concept of the song goes nowhere beyond the obvious connotations of the title and musically, it sounds as though the love affair lasted longer than it took to write the song." The Scotsman's Fiona Shepherd branded the song "dreary".

=== Chart performance ===
"30 Minute Love Affair" made its debut on the UK Singles Chart before its official release. The song later rose from number 87 to a peak position of number 50, selling 7,414 copies.

== Music video ==
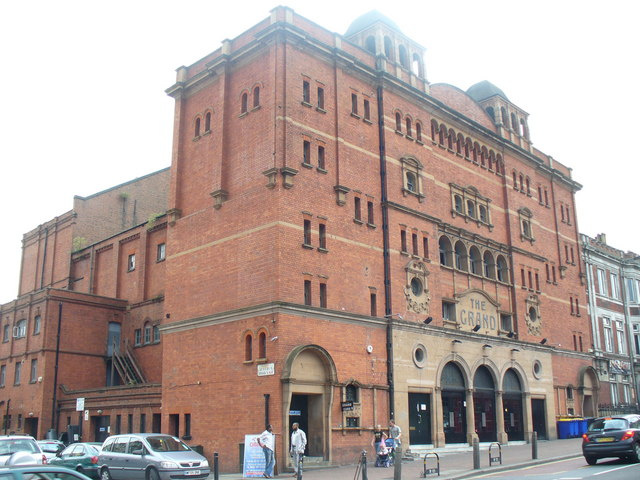
The music video for "30 Minute Love Affair" was shot at the Clapham Grand.

The accompanying music video, directed by Emil Nava, was released on 9 July 2012. It was filmed on location at the Clapham Grand on 12 June 2012. In the video, Faith wears a bronze 50's inspired dress, which was co-designed by herself and her stylist, Karl Willett and made by Wendy Benstead. The dress is accessorised with a customised hair flower of the same colour and a faux fur stole. Faith commented that her look was inspired by a dress worn by Marilyn Monroe. Of the dancers featured in the video, Faith stated "This is a autobiographical piece, where I'm sort of including both types of dancers that I used to look at, that I found empowering, but also the types of dancers that I used to look at, that I found degrading, and sort of meshing it all into this hyper-real version of what was really the early days of my career." Nava added that he approached the video for "30 Minute Love Affair" with a view to making it simplistic and cinematic.

The concept of the video is that Faith has had an argument with her boyfriend, played by the singer's real-life friend James, and stormed off to an underground strip club in London's Soho. She then meets another man, who distracts her. Faith performs "30 Minute Love Affair" on the stage at the club. The singer later disappears from the stage and has "an intensive" brief relationship with the man, who also played the piano for her during her performance. Faith then returns to her boyfriend.

Becca Longmire of Entertainmentwise commented that the video is "very Paloma-esque!" While a BT Vision website writer called it "stylish". Digital Spy's Copsey stated "Soho's red light district is an apt setting for Paloma's latest clip, which is packed to the brim with vintage glamour." On 1 August 2012, an acoustic session video of "30 Minute Love Affair" was released. Filmed in black and white, it simply features Faith singing the track.

== Live performances ==
Faith performed "30 Minute Love Affair" for the 2DAY show on BBC Radio 2 on 10 May 2012. She later performed the track at New York City's Le Baron club as part of an event sponsored by Absolut Vodka. On 20 July, Faith gave a performance of "30 Minute Love Affair" on Superstar. The following month, she appeared on Channel 4's Sunday Brunch to sing and promote the track.

== Track listing and formats ==
- Digital download
1. "30 Minute Love Affair" – 3:19
- 30 Minute Love Affair (Remixes) – EP
1. "30 Minute Love Affair" – 3:19
2. "30 Minute Love Affair" (M-Factor Remix) – 3:07
3. "30 Minute Love Affair" (DC Breaks Remix) – 4:25
4. "30 Minute Love Affair" (Hostage Remix) – 3:28

== Credits and personnel ==
Credits were adapted from Fall to Grace album liner notes.

- Paloma Faith – vocals, songwriter
- Chris Braide – songwriter
- Nellee Hooper – producer, mixer, keyboards, drums
- Jake Gosling – keyboards, drums
- Simon Gogerly – mix engineer
- Dave Miles – audio engineering

== Charts ==
"30 Minute Love Affair" chart performance
| Chart (2012) | Peak position |
|---|---|
| Scottish Singles Sales (Official Charts) | 42 |
| UK Singles (Official Charts) | 50 |

== Release history ==
"30 Minute Love Affair" release history
| Region | Date | Format | Label | Ref. |
|---|---|---|---|---|
| Ireland | 10 August 2012 | Digital download; digital EP | RCA | |
| United Kingdom | 12 August 2012 | Digital download; digital EP | RCA | |
