= Willie Hutch =

American singer-songwriter and record producer (1944–2005)

Background information
- Born: William McKinley Hutchison; December 6, 1944; Los Angeles, California, U.S.
- Origin: Dallas, Texas, U.S.
- Died: September 19, 2005 (aged 60) Dallas, Texas, U.S.
- Genres: Funk; soul
- Occupations: Singer, musician, recording artist, producer, songwriter
- Instruments: Vocals, guitar
- Years active: 1969–2005
- Labels: RCA, Motown, Whitfield

William McKinley Hutchison (December 6, 1944 – September 19, 2005), better known as Willie Hutch, was an American singer, songwriter as well as a record producer and recording artist for the Motown record label during the 1970s and 1980s.

== Biography ==
Born in 1944 in Los Angeles, Hutch was raised in Dallas, Texas. He joined the high school choral group, The Ambassadors, as a teenager. After graduating from Booker T. Washington High School in 1962, he shortened his surname when he started his music career in 1964 on the Soul City label with the song "Love Has Put Me Down".

After his move to Los Angeles, his music came to the attention of the mentor for pop/soul quintet The 5th Dimension, and Hutch was soon writing, producing, and arranging songs for the group. In 1969, he signed with RCA Records and put out two albums before he was asked by Motown producer Hal Davis to write lyrics to "I'll Be There", a song he wrote for The Jackson 5. The song was recorded by the group the morning after Hutch received the call. Motown CEO Berry Gordy signed Hutch to be a staff writer, arranger, producer, and musician shortly thereafter.

Hutch later co-wrote songs that were recorded by the Jackson 5 and their front man Michael Jackson, Smokey Robinson, the Miracles, and Marvin Gaye. In 1973, Hutch started recording albums for Motown, releasing the Fully Exposed album that year. That same year, Hutch recorded and produced the soundtrack to the Blaxploitation film, The Mack. Hutch had several R&B hits during this period, including "Brother's Gonna Work It Out" and "Slick". He also recorded the soundtrack for the 1974 film Foxy Brown. He recorded at least six albums for Motown, peaking with 1975's single "Love Power", which reached number 41 on the Billboard Hot 100. He left Motown in 1977 for Norman Whitfield's Whitfield Records.

Hutch returned to Motown in 1982, where he scored the disco hit, "In and Out", that same year and also recorded a couple of songs – "The Glow" and "Inside You" – for the 1985 film The Last Dragon. He had a club hit with the song "Keep on Jammin'" as well. Hutch left Motown again by the end of the decade and by 1994 had moved back to Dallas.

He died in Dallas, Texas on September 19, 2005, aged 60. No cause was given when he died. He was the uncle of Cold 187um of the rap group Above the Law as well as rapper and singer Kokane. His manager, Anthony Voyce, said of Hutch: "I've never met a more generous and caring person."

== Discography ==
=== Studio albums ===
Year	Album	Chart positions		Label
Year	Album	US Pop	US R&B	Label
1969	Soul Portrait	—	—	RCA
1970	Season for Love	—	—	RCA
1973	Fully Exposed	183	15	Motown
1973	The Mack (soundtrack)	114	17	Motown
1974	Foxy Brown (soundtrack)	179	36	Motown
1974	The Mark of the Beast	—	41	Motown
1975	Ode to My Lady	150	24	Motown
1976	Color Her Sunshine	—	54	Motown
1976	Concert in Blues	163	22	Motown
1977	Havin' a House Party	—	26	Motown
1978	In Tune	—	63	Whitfield
1979	Midnight Dancer	—	—	Whitfield
1985	Making a Game Out of Love	—	—	Motown
1994	From the Heart	—	—	Omni Records
1996	The Mack Is Back	—	—	Midwest Records
2002	Sexalicious	—	—	GG.it Records
"—" denotes releases that did not chart.

=== Compilation albums ===
- In and Out (1983)
- Try It You'll Like It (The Best of Willie Hutch) (2003)

=== Singles ===
Year	Single	Peak chart positions				Album
Year	Single	US Pop	US R&B	US Dance	UK	Album
1965	"The Duck"	―	—	―	―	Non-album singles
1966	"I Can't Get Enough"	―	—	―	―	Non-album singles
1967	"How Come Baby, You Don't Love Me"	―	—	―	―	Non-album singles
1968	"Use What You Got"	―	—	―	―	Non-album singles
1969	"Do What You Wanna Do"	―	—	―	―	Soul Portrait
1970	"Walking on My Love"	―	—	―	―	Season for Love
1970	"When a Boy Falls in Love"	―	—	―	―	Season for Love
1970	"Love Games"	―	—	―	―	Non-album single
1973	"Brother's Gonna Work It Out"	67	18	―	―	The Mack
1973	"Slick"	65	18	―	―	The Mack
1973	"Sunshine Lady"	―	72	―	―	Fully Exposed
1973	"If You Ain't Got No Money (You Can't Get No Honey)"	―	70	―	―	Fully Exposed
1974	"Theme of Foxy Brown"	―	64	―	―	Foxy Brown
1974	"Foxy Lady"	―	—	―	―	Foxy Brown
1974	"Chase"	―	—	―	―	Foxy Brown
1974	"Ain't That (Mellow, Mellow)"	―	—	―	―	Foxy Brown
1975	"Get Ready for the Get Down"	―	24	―	―	The Mark of the Beast
1975	"Love Power"	41	8	―	―	Ode to My Lady
1976	"Party Down"	―	19	―	―	Ode to My Lady
1976	"Let Me Be the One, Baby"	―	95	―	―	Color Her Sunshine
1976	"Shake It, Shake It"	―	60	―	―	Color Her Sunshine
1977	"We Gonna Party Tonight"	―	49	―	―	Havin' a House Party
1977	"We Gonna Have a House Party"	―	—	―	―	Havin' a House Party
1977	"What You Gonna Do After the Party"	―	40	―	―	Havin' a House Party
1978	"All American Funkathon"	―	62	―	―	In Tune
1978	"Paradise"	―	74	―	―	In Tune
1978	"Come On and Dance with Me"	―	—	―	―	In Tune
1979	"Everybody Needs Money"	―	—	―	―	Midnight Dancer
1979	"Kelly Green"	―	—	―	―	Midnight Dancer
1982	"In and Out"	―	55	29	51	In and Out
1985	"Keep on Jammin'"	―	―	―	73	Making a Game Out of Love
1985	"The Glow"	―	―	―	―	Making a Game Out of Love and The Last Dragon: Original Soundtrack Album
1991	"I Choose You"	―	—	―	―	The Mack
"—" denotes releases that did not chart or were not released in that territory.
