= Only Love Can Hurt Like This =

2014 single by Paloma Faith

Single by Paloma Faith

from the album A Perfect Contradiction
- Released: 11 May 2014
- Genre: Pop; soul
- Length: 3:52 (album version); 3:37 (radio edit)
- Label: RCA
- Songwriter: Diane Warren
- Producers: AC Burrell; Kyle Townsend

Paloma Faith singles chronology
"Can't Rely on You" (2014)	"Only Love Can Hurt Like This" (2014)	"Trouble with My Baby" (2014)

Music video
- "Only Love Can Hurt Like This" on YouTube

"Only Love Can Hurt Like This" is a song by English singer Paloma Faith, written by Diane Warren. Released as the second single to promote her third studio album, A Perfect Contradiction (2014), on 11 May 2014, it was promoted on shows such as Alan Carr: Chatty Man. The song peaked at number six in the United Kingdom, making it Faith's highest-charting single as a solo artist in the country. In Australia, the song was promoted through a high-profile TV advertisement for Channel 7's drama series Winners & Losers, and it reached number one on the ARIA Singles Chart on 26 July 2014. In 2022, due to a resurgence of popularity on TikTok, the song charted in several other countries.

== Background and composition ==
"Only Love Can Hurt Like This" was written by Diane Warren, who has previously written songs for Whitney Houston, Cher, Toni Braxton, LeAnn Rimes, Celine Dion, Christina Aguilera and Britney Spears. Initially, Faith refused to record the song because she hadn't any writing credit for it, however after hearing the song Faith felt overwhelmed by how (lyrically) the song reflected on her relationship and emotion at the time. Warren has also written a song with a synonymous title, "Nothing Hurts Like Love", sung by Daniel Bedingfield. The song "Only Love Can Hurt Like This" was premiered in a stripped back acoustic version on Amazon.com, and was later performed at a Burberry fashion show in February 2014; later this performance was made available on the iTunes Store.

The song has been described as a Motown-influenced sixties-style ballad and is a largely acoustic song featuring mainly brass and drums, expanding to include backing vocals and heavy use of violins in the final choruses. The song also includes subtle piano accentuation. The iTunes album review for A Perfect Contradiction describes the song as: "[a] towering, wall-of-sound ballad ..." - a reference to the production formula developed by record producer Phil Spector.

== Follow-up material ==
Diane Warren has written for Faith twice again, towards the single "Leave While I'm Not Looking" (featured on the 'Outsider's Edition' of A Perfect Contradiction), and "The Crazy Ones" (featured as the main theme of the film "Miss You Already").

== Music video ==
The official music video for "Only Love Can Hurt Like This" was preceded by an "Off the Cuff" version, released on Faith's official Vevo account and was premiered on 31 March 2014. In this video, is shown just Paloma (looking typically vampish in a trademark vintage outfit) and her pianist (Dom Pipkin, who had previously recorded piano for Faith on the acoustic tracks included in the deluxe edition of Fall to Grace) performing the song alone in a room. This video was directed by Anthony Saul.

On 25 April, Faith uploaded a teaser of the official music video on her official Instagram account, and informed that the video was set to release on 28 April. The song's official video has been credited to Denna Cartamkhoub (as the producer) and Paul Gore (as the director) who also worked with Faith on her "Can't Rely on You"'s and Trouble with My Baby's music video. The video for this song was shot by Daniel Landin.

== Uses in media ==
The track was used in the promotional video for the 2015 season of the New Zealand popular soap opera Shortland Street. Faith performed the song at the 2015 BRIT Awards which was held on 25 February 2015. An indoor rain system was activated to add emotive effect. After her performance, Faith commented: "I am drenched!" and "I just sang my song... in torrential rain!". Wayne McGregor's "Random Dancers" performed in the background. A cover of the song in Spanish, titled "Sólo el Amor Lastima Así", was released by the Mexican band Motel, featuring María José, for the 2015 film A La Mala. The song went viral on TikTok in 2022. Faith subsequently released a slowed-down version of the song, which also went viral on the platform.

== Track listings and formats ==
- Digital download
1. "Only Love Can Hurt Like This" – 3:52
- Digital download – Live Performance for Burberry
1. "Only Love Can Hurt Like This" (Live for Burberry) – 6:19
- Digital download – remixes
1. "Only Love Can Hurt Like This" (MS MR Remix) – 3:34
2. "Only Love Can Hurt Like This" (Adam Turner Remix) – 6:53
- Audio CD
1. "Only Love Can Hurt Like This" (Radio edit)
2. "Only Love Can Hurt Like This" (Instrumental)

== Charts ==
=== Weekly charts ===
2014 weekly chart performance for "Only Love Can Hurt Like This"
Chart (2014)	Peak position
Australia (ARIA)	1
Croatia (HRT)	14
Ireland (IRMA)	26
New Zealand (Recorded Music NZ)	3
Scottish Singles Sales (Official Charts)	5
UK Singles (Official Charts)	6

2022 weekly chart performance for "Only Love Can Hurt Like This"
Chart (2022)	Peak position
Global 200 (Billboard)	75
Greece International (IFPI)	75
Netherlands (Single Tip)	9
Portugal (AFP)	94
Sweden Heatseeker (Sverigetopplistan)	12
UK Singles (Official Charts)	58

=== Year-end charts ===
2014 year-end chart performance for "Only Love Can Hurt Like This"
Chart (2014)	Position
Australia (ARIA)	17
New Zealand (Recorded Music NZ)	22
UK Singles (OCC)	37

2022 year-end chart performance for "Only Love Can Hurt Like This"
Chart (2022)	Position
Global 200 (Billboard)	168

== Certifications ==
Certifications for "Only Love Can Hurt Like This"
Region	Certification	Certified units/sales
Australia (ARIA)	4× Platinum	280,000^{‡}
Denmark (IFPI Danmark)	Platinum	90,000^{‡}
Germany (BVMI)	Gold	300,000^{‡}
Italy (FIMI)	Gold	50,000^{‡}
Mexico (AMPROFON)	2× Platinum+Gold	150,000^{‡}
New Zealand (RMNZ)	5× Platinum	150,000^{‡}
Portugal (AFP)	Gold	10,000^{‡}
Spain (Promusicae)	Platinum	60,000^{‡}
United Kingdom (BPI)	4× Platinum	2,400,000^{‡}
Streaming
Greece (IFPI Greece)	Gold	1,000,000^{†}
^{‡} Sales+streaming figures based on certification alone.^{†} Streaming-only figures based on certification alone.

== Release history ==
Country	Date	Format
United Kingdom	11 May 2014	Digital download
