= Fall to Grace =

Studio album by Paloma Faith
- Released: 28 May 2012
- Recorded: 2011–2012
- Length: 44:57
- Label: RCA
- Producers: Nellee Hooper; Jake Gosling; Al Shux; David Arnold

Paloma Faith chronology
Do You Want the Truth or Something Beautiful? (2009)	Fall to Grace (2012)	A Perfect Contradiction (2014)

Singles from Fall to Grace
- 1. "Picking Up the Pieces" Released: 20 May 2012; 2. "30 Minute Love Affair" Released: 10 August 2012; 3. "Just Be" Released: 16 December 2012; 4. "Black & Blue" Released: 11 March 2013

Fall to Grace is the second studio album by English singer Paloma Faith, released on 28 May 2012 by RCA Records. She worked on the album with producer Nellee Hooper, who previously worked with artists such as Madonna, Björk, Massive Attack, and Gwen Stefani. The album was received positively by most critics. A deluxe edition was released the same day, which contains acoustic versions of five songs from the album.

The album's lead single was "Picking Up the Pieces", which was released on 20 May 2012 and peaked at number 7, making it Paloma's highest-charting single until "Only Love Can Hurt Like This" peaked at number 6. Fall to Grace peaked at number 2 in the UK and was certified Double Platinum by the British Phonographic Industry, denoting shipments in excess of 600,000 copies. Four more singles were released from the album, "30 Minute Love Affair", "Never Tear Us Apart", "Just Be" and "Black & Blue". "Never Tear Us Apart" is only included on the reissue of the album. Paloma embarked on her second tour in early 2013 to promote the album.

== Background ==
Paloma revealed that she was working on a second album in March 2010. In July 2011, Paloma revealed that she did not know when the album was going to be completed and she branded the process "slow". She told Kristy Kelly of Digital Spy "The album's not finished yet and I'm not sure when it will be. If I had my way it would be out tomorrow, but there are so many other people involved that nothing happens quickly."

On 29 February 2012, Paloma revealed her second album would be called Fall to Grace and that it would be released by RCA Records on 28 May 2012. Paloma enlisted record producer Nellee Hooper and co-producer Jake Gosling to work with her on the project. Hooper told a writer for NME that he had not really heard of Paloma as he was living in Los Angeles when her first album was released. He said Sony and RCA Records contacted him and suggested he meet her. Paloma wrote and recorded the album in London. Paloma told an Australian magazine about the writing of the album: "What I did was start by leisurely writing songs at a slow pace, she says. I didn't think about the sonics or anything; I was just writing on a guitar or piano, it was just the bare bones. My management were nice about it. There was no pressure." It was announced that Fall to Grace is set to be reissued with new tracks on 22 October 2012. "Never Tear Us Apart" was released on 28 September 2012 as the first single from the reissued album and serves as the third single from the album overall.

== Concept and artwork ==
Paloma said that the album would contain more "agony and suffering" than her first album and hoped it would be made with one producer for a more "solid piece of work." She explained: "I love the beautiful side of things like that Tom Waitsy, Rufus Wainwrighty, Ed Harcourt sort of stuff, and in contrast I like all the OutKast production, Gnarls Barkley and 'Beggin' and all that sort of sound. Contemporary but with a nod to the past. But you never know. You might just meet someone and something else would make sense."

Of the album, Paloma stated "The new album has taken on a very cinematic mood. I am very excited to introduce my new sound into the world. Working with Nellee Hooper (Björk, Madonna) has been really inspirational." Paloma further commented on working with Hooper:

He's the first person in the music industry that I've met who completely understands all my references .... Generally when I work, creatively my references are not musical, they're visual – from art or film. Nellie is the first person I've ever worked with who totally gets that because he's very much an art and film fan himself. In the past I felt misunderstood and had to kind of force-feed people pictures, or buy them DVDs and say, 'Go home and watch this'. He'd seen it all already.

Paloma told Dom Gourlay of Contactmusic.com that Fall to Grace is a personal record about a period of her life. Likewise, Hooper said that working with Paloma reminded him of his work with Björk: "At lunch [Paloma Faith] sat and talked in such detail, as if every song was a short film, referencing everything from Chinese romantic cinema to Hip Hop."

In an interview with The Guardian Paloma referred to Fall to Grace as "a soundtrack to my last few years", and added: "Relationships with friends and family. Romances. I'd love to say that I could write political songs but I don't feel clued-up enough. I decided the next best thing would be socio-commentary, observing people." She said that she was a fan of Plan B's song "Ill Manors," about the 2011 riots across England, and so had attempted a track of her own dealing with similar issues. The Guardian interview further conveys, in the same connection:

She also revealed that she thought she'd make a video for the song, Black & Blue, a song from the album, that had her crooning during a riot… but a cackle, after she says this, seems to acknowledge it was a bad idea. Tricky concept to pull off without causing offence, and Paloma is sensitive about being seen as cut off or removed from the unrest that sparked 2011's troubles in her native Hackney.

In another interview Paloma explained the title of album, saying that she "took the phrase fall from grace, which is usually when people have come from something good and screwed up. I decided that my life was the opposite. So it’s a positive message about turning some difficult situations into something better, happier and more peaceful. My experience of turning tragedy into hope." The artwork for the album was revealed on 11 April 2012. It features Paloma mid-air, draped in a flowing red dress (or blue dress on the deluxe edition), while surrounded by blue-and-yellow macaws. In a video posted to her Vevo channel on YouTube, Paloma described the concept as she is falling down into paradise, matching the album's theme of leaving sad situations and going into a hopeful situation.

== Promotion ==
=== Singles ===
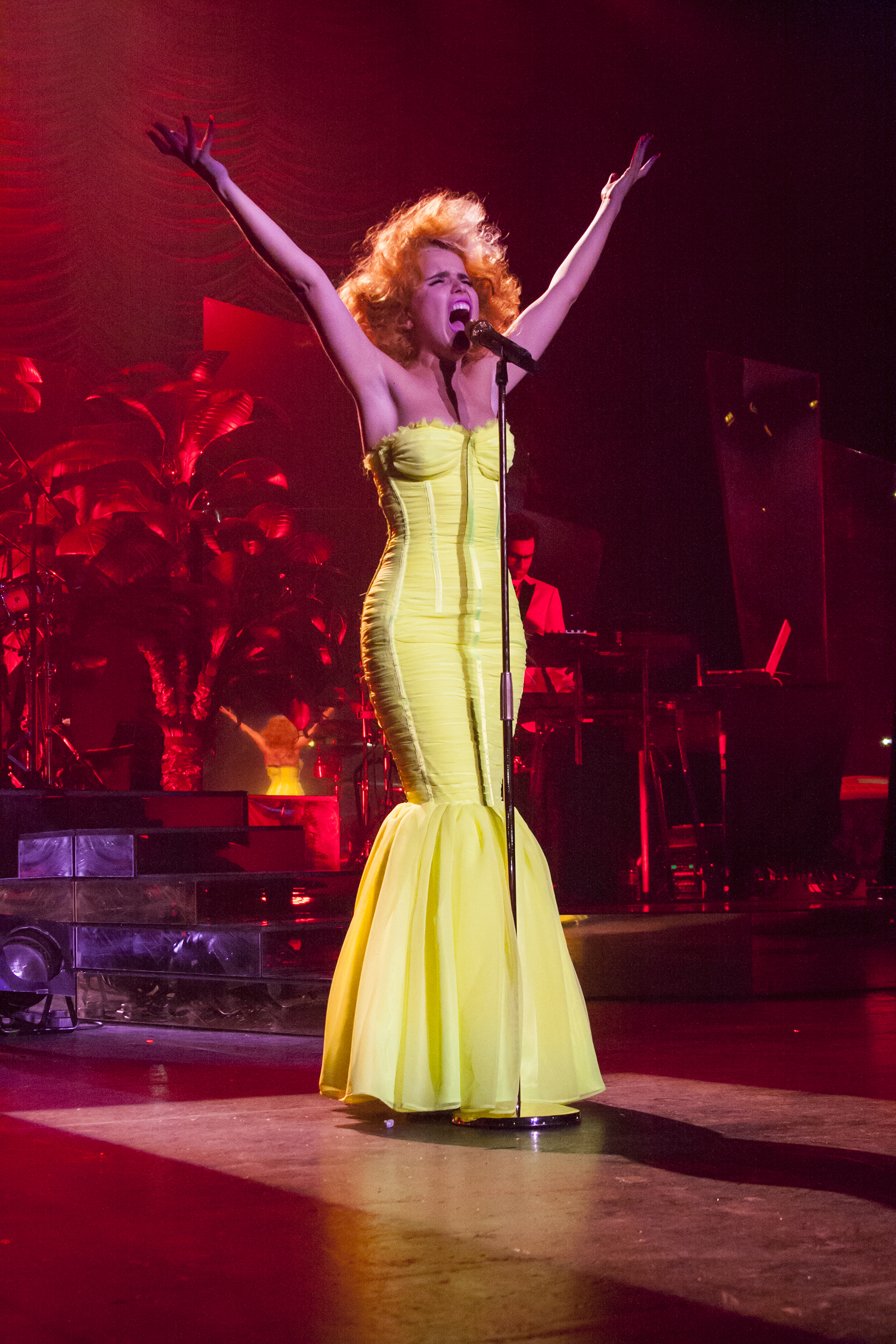
Faith on her Fall to Grace tour in Manchester, January 2013

The album's lead single, "Picking Up the Pieces", was released on 20 May 2012. It peaked at number seven on the UK Singles Chart becoming Faith's first top ten UK single. Paloma described the single as being about "...the issues of being in a relationship with someone who is still recovering from a previous relationship with another person. It is a song about self-doubt and insecurity." The single debuted at number 7 in the UK, becoming Paloma's highest-charting single. The music video was directed by Emil Nava. In describing the artwork for the single, she did so in homage of Marilyn Monroe who sometimes had a tragic look in her eyes while she overall appearing glamorous; Paloma attempted to achieve the same look of vulnerability and beauty, as if she was caught unprepared before she was heading to an event.

"30 Minute Love Affair" was released as the second single on 10 August 2012. Paloma stated that the song was written while remembering meeting a busker when she was 14, singing songs with him and falling a little in love, but she did not see him, again, even though he promised he would be back the next day. The artwork of the single reflects as it depicts a fantasy of what she believes it would have felt like if they met, again, and shows her in a dreamy setting about to kiss a man. The song's music video was directed by Emil Nava. Paloma's cover of INXS's "Never Tear Us Apart" was released as the third single on 28 September 2012 (the first single from the reissued and American versions of Fall to Grace). The song was featured in the UK television commercial for John Lewis, which began airing from 15 September 2012. It peaked in the UK Top 20.

"Just Be" was released as the fourth single from the album on 16 December 2012. Paloma described the song as showing her at her most vulnerable, as it is bare bones in being just her vocals accompanied by a piano. The artwork for the single depicts Paloma in a similar way, wearing very little make-up and exposing her imperfections while being at home with herself and her flaws. "Black & Blue" was released in March 2013, as the fifth single from the album. A music video was released online. To promote the album, the acoustic version of "Black & Blue" was made available as a free download on the British Amazon MP3 store from 15 May 2012 until 3 July 2012.

=== Tour ===
In June 2012, Paloma announced details of a UK, Ireland and United States tour to promote Fall to Grace. The tour started in September, visiting United States, while the European leg started in Dublin on 21 January 2013. Paloma previously admitted that she did not want to tour Fall to Grace until her fans knew all of the words to the songs. In July 2012, Paloma added nine more dates to the tour.

== Critical reception ==
Professional ratings
Aggregate scores
Source	Rating
AnyDecentMusic?	5.5/10
Metacritic	62/100
Review scores
Source	Rating
AllMusic	3/5 stars
BBC	8/10 stars
Daily Express	3/5 stars
Digital Spy	4/5 stars
Entertainment Weekly	9.1 stars on a 10 point scale
The Guardian	2/5 stars
Rolling Stone	3/5 stars

The album has been received positively by most critics. Phil Johnson from The Independent had mixed response, said: "There's such a belt-and-braces approach that the array of sounds (strings, choirs, tubular bells, beats and synths, dubby blurbs and squeaks) can come across as overbearing, while Paloma's moody vocals are mannered by design". "But the biggest and best numbers – "Picking Up the Pieces", "Blood, Sweat & Tears"- achieve real grandeur". Robert Copsey from Digital Spy had a more positive review, telling: "There's no such worry on Fall To Grace which, at times, feels astonishingly honest. A shining example is lead single 'Picking Up The Pieces', an epic song about relationship neuroses that feels worthy of its own Adele moment". "Producer Nellee Hooper and Jake Gosling remain at the helm throughout, creating sumptuous melodies on ballads 'Black & Blue' and 'Just Be' that are packed to the brim with old glamour". "Countering the slower moments are smoky disco numbers 'Blood Sweat & Tears' and '30 Minute Love Affair', the latter a Cyndi Lauper-meets-Drive number whose hooks dig much deeper than you'd expect. She scapes depressing us with her constant tales of relationship woes on the chorus of 'Freedom' which, despite the subject matter, has a wonderful gospel-like quality. That said, they're up against some seriously stellar competition – and while her collaborators may have an ear for a chorus, there's no question that Fall To Grace is unmistakably 'Paloma'".

A review from the Daily Express by Simon Cage had a mixed response, he said: "Add world-class writers and producers with everyone from Adele to Madonna on their CVs and it's no surprise that this is a high-quality outing". "The songs, though good, are over-sung while it just seems horribly unspontaneous". OSoM Blog mentions Fall to Grace as an album providing "over 40 minutes of enjoyable pop". Nick Levine from BBC, said: "Lead single Picking Up the Pieces is epic, like stallions galloping across the silver screen, and Fall to Grace has several other grand, cinematic ballads. However, Paloma and Hooper know that films aren't just about big Oscar-grabbing moments, so they vary the tone". "'30 Minute Love Affair' is Annie Lennox-style synth-pop. Let Me Down Easy works a kind of "supper club dub" sound. Agony seems to be rewriting Lana Del Rey's 'Video Games', but then decides to sound like Tori Amos covering 'Mr. Brightside'. Phew! It takes two imperfect people to dance a sweet ballet," she sings on Blood, Sweat & Tears, offering a neat précis of the Paloma perspective: romantic but realistic. The quality slips towards the finish, but not enough to spoil a supremely accomplished second album". "Fall to Grace is proof that pop doesn't need to be grey and restrained to feel grown-up." Fall to Grace was nominated for best British Album at the 2013 Brit Awards.

== Commercial performance ==
Fall to Grace debuted at number two on the UK Albums Chart for the week ending 2 June 2012, behind Gary Barlow's Sing. The position marked Paloma's highest-charting album with sales of 35,024. The following week, the album fell one place to number three with 14,373 copies sold. The album dropped to number five in its third week, selling 18,308 copies. The album rebounded to number three in its fourth week on the chart, with sales of 15,051 copies. The album spent a total of five consecutive weeks in the top ten since its release, before dropping from number ten to 11 in its sixth week on the chart. The album remained in the top twenty until its eleventh week when it ascended from number 16 to five. The following week it climbed even higher to match its peak position of two, remaining there for a second week. The album spent a further two weeks in the top ten before dropping to number 12 for the date issued 22 September 2012. By its nineteenth week on the chart, Fall to Grace still remained within the top twenty of the chart. The following week it saw a large decline to number 33. However, for the issue dated 3 November 2012, the album leaped from number 35 into the top ten at number nine, marking its eleventh total week in the top ten. It remained at the position the following week, and rose to number eight in its 24th total week on the chart.

As of 17 November 2012, the album has spent 13 weeks inside the top ten and has totaled 50 weeks in the UK Album Chart Top 100 as of 12 May 2013. The album has been certified Platinum by the British Phonographic Industry for sales of 300,000 copies. Fall to Grace was the 11th biggest selling album of 2012 according to official charts selling a total of 449,000 copies. On the Irish Albums Chart, Fall to Grace debuted at number 21 on 24 May 2012. The album re-entered the chart in its third week, reaching number ten. As of 13 September 2012, the album has spent 15 weeks on the chart in total. In Scotland, Fall to Grace debuted at number one for the issue dated 9 June 2012, becoming Paloma's first chart-topping album. The album has spent 27 weeks on the chart in total as of 8 December 2012. It has also charted in other European territories; in Switzerland at number 36 and Finland at 44. Furthermore, it has reached number 49 in Australia and 14 in New Zealand, spending one week on the chart in both countries. Fall to Grace sold over 600,000 copies and was certified Double Platinum by the BPI.

== Track listing ==
Fall to Grace track listing
No.	Title	Writer(s)	Producer(s)	Length
1.	"Picking Up the Pieces"	Paloma Faith; Wayne Hector; Tim Powell	Nellee Hooper; Jake Gosling^{[a]}	4:04
2.	"30 Minute Love Affair"	Faith; Chris Braide	Hooper	3:19
3.	"Black & Blue"	Faith; Francis White	Hooper; Gosling^{[a]}	4:02
4.	"Just Be"	Faith; Greg Wells; Matt Hales	Hooper; Gosling^{[a]}	4:37
5.	"Let Me Down Easy"	Wrecia Holloway	Hooper; Gosling^{[a]}	2:47
6.	"Blood, Sweat & Tears"	Faith; Toby Gad	Hooper; Gosling^{[a]}	4:18
7.	"Beauty of the End"	Faith; White	Hooper	3:22
8.	"When You're Gone"	Faith; Dan Wilson	Hooper; Gosling^{[a]}	4:15
9.	"Agony"	Faith; Paddy Byrne; Blair MacKichan	Hooper; Gosling^{[a]}	3:11
10.	"Let Your Love Walk In"	Faith; Ed Harcourt	Hooper	4:23
11.	"Freedom"	Faith; Alexander Shuckburgh; Samuel Dixon	Al Shux	3:20
12.	"Streets of Glory"	Faith; Hector; Steve Robson	David Arnold; Gosling	3:19
Total length:				44:57

Reissued edition bonus track
No.	Title	Writer(s)	Producer(s)	Length
13.	"Never Tear Us Apart"	Andrew Farriss; Michael Hutchence	Hooper	3:05

Deluxe edition disc 2
No.	Title	Length
1.	"Picking Up the Pieces" (acoustic version)	3:47
2.	"30 Minute Love Affair" (acoustic version)	3:48
3.	"Black & Blue" (acoustic version)	4:03
4.	"Just Be" (acoustic version)	4:50
5.	"Agony" (acoustic version)	3:11

iTunes bonus video content
No.	Title	Length
1.	"Picking Up the Pieces" (acoustic version)	4:05
2.	"Black & Blue" (acoustic version)	4:02

=== Notes ===
- ^{^a} signifies a co-producer.

== Personnel ==
Credits were adapted from AllMusic.

- Roberto Angrisani – choir
- David Arnold – producer, string arrangements, background vocals
- Guy Barker – brass arrangement, string arrangements, trumpet
- Xavier Barnett – background vocals
- Dick Beetham – mastering
- Elisa Bergerson – viola
- Ellen Blair – violin
- Graeme Blevins – tenor saxophone
- Fiona Bonds – viola
- Natalia Bonner – violin
- John Bradbury – orchestra leader, violin
- Rachel Byrt – viola
- Eos Chater – violin
- Clare Connors – violin
- Nick Cooper – celli
- Sam Dixon – bass
- Alison Dods – violin
- Liz Edwards – violin
- Dai Emmanuel – violin
- Paloma Faith – primary artist, vocals, background vocals
- Ghislaine Fleischmann – violin
- Simon Gogerly – mixing
- Larry Gold – cello, string arrangements
- Jake Gosling – bass, drums, keyboards, producer, programming, background vocals
- Timothy Grant – viola
- Isobel Griffiths – contractor
- Ed Harcourt – celeste, electric guitar, piano
- Roger Harvey – tenor trombone
- Margrit Hasler – viola
- Peter Honore – guitar, acoustic guitar, electric guitar
- Nellee Hooper – drums, keyboards, mixing, producer, programming, background vocals
- Denise Hudson – background vocals
- Andy Hughes – engineer
- Martin Humbey – viola
- Ian Humphries – violin
- Katherine Jenkinson – celli
- Janine Johnson – choir
- Magnus Johnston – violin
- Louise Keen – choir
- Olga Konopelsky – violin
- Rick Koster – violin
- Emma Kummrow – violin
- David Lale – celli
- Chris Laurence – bass
- Chris Leonard – guitar
- Mike Lovatt – trumpet
- Charlotte Matthews – contractor
- Rachel Matthews – choir
- Luigi Mazzochi – violin
- Lorraine McAslan – violin
- Dave Miles – engineer
- Naomi Miller – choir, background vocals
- Mark Nightingale – tenor trombone
- Vivian Nwonka – choir
- David Odlum – mixing, vocal engineer
- Ishia Osborne – choir
- Charles Parker – violin
- Helen Patterson – violin
- Adele Pentlan – choir
- Ladonna Harley Peters – background vocals
- Dom Pipkin – piano
- Dominic Pipkin – piano, background vocals
- Christopher J. Porter – design, layout
- David Powell – tuba
- Tim Powell – strings
- Richard Pryer – bass
- Tom Rees-Roberts – trumpet
- Carlos Rubio – violin
- Vanessa Samafu – choir
- Patrick Savage – violin
- William Schofield – celli
- Al Shux – drums, guitar, organ, piano, producer
- Darren Simpson – engineer
- Sonia Slany – violin
- Tiffany Smith – background vocals
- David Standish – photography
- Anna Szabo – violin
- Ed Tarrant – bass trombone
- Julian Tear – violin
- Jonathan Truscott – violin
- Helen Tunstall – harp
- Urban Voices Choir – choir
- Edward Vanderspar – viola
- Bozidar Vukotic – celli
- Lucy Waterhouse – violin
- Derek Watkins – trumpet
- Alistair White – trombone
- Pat White – trumpet
- Karl Willetts – choir
- Dave Williams – violin
- David Woodcock – violin
- Tony Woollard – celli

== Charts ==
=== Weekly charts ===
Fall to Grace weekly chart performance
Chart (2012)	Peak position
Australian Albums (ARIA)	49
Finnish Albums (Suomen virallinen lista)	44
Irish Albums (IRMA)	10
New Zealand Albums (RMNZ)	15
Scottish Albums (Official Charts)	1
Swiss Albums (Schweizer Hitparade)	36
UK Albums (Official Charts)	2
US Billboard 200	170
US Heatseekers Albums (Billboard)	2

=== Year-end charts ===
Fall to Grace year-end chart performance
Chart (2012)	Position
UK Albums (OCC)	11
Chart (2013)	Position
UK Albums (OCC)	61

=== Decade-end charts ===
Fall to Grace decade-end chart performance
Chart (2010–2019)	Position
UK Albums (OCC)	88

== Certifications ==
Fall to Grace certifications
Country	Certification	Sales/shipments
United Kingdom (BPI)	2× Platinum	744,751

== Release history ==
Fall to Grace release history
Region	Date	Format(s)	Version(s)	Ref.
United Kingdom	28 May 2012	CD; digital download	Standard	
Australia	1 June 2012	CD; digital download	Standard	
New Zealand	17 June 2012	CD; digital download	Standard	
United Kingdom	22 October 2012	CD; digital download	Reissued	
United States	4 December 2012	CD; digital download	US Version	
