= Simon Gogerly =

- Birth name: Simon Gogerly
- Origin: United Kingdom
- Genres: Rock, pop, R&B, electronic
- Occupation(s): Mixer, producer, engineer
- Instrument(s): Guitar, vocals, bass, keyboards
- Years active: 1988–present
- Website: http://www.simongogerly.com

Simon Gogerly is a British audio engineer with credits including artists such as U2, Paloma Faith, No Doubt and Massive Attack.

Gogerly started his career playing keyboards on tour in the 1980s for the new wave band Dead or Alive. He then went on to become an assistant engineer at London's Mayfair Studios training under studio owner and engineer John Hudson. It was at Mayfair Studios that Gogerly started to move from engineering to mixing, working on The Farm's hit "All Together Now" and Soul II Soul's "Missing You". After going freelance in 1992, he recorded the album Republic by New Order, produced by Stephen Hague. He then went on to tour with the band as programmer.

Throughout the 1990s, Gogerly continued to work for Stephen Hague as well as other producers such as Sly & Robbie and Boilerhouse. Gogerly also worked on a number of hip hop remixes with producer Syze-Up under the name Desert Eagle Discs for artists such as Missy Elliott, Busta Rhymes and Lil' Kim.

At the end of the '90s, Gogerly started to work alongside Nellee Hooper as a mixer for his label Meanwhile. Soon, Gogerly became Hooper's go to mix engineer and he went on to work with No Doubt, Gwen Stefani, Massive Attack and Paloma Faith. Gogerly also worked with Hooper on U2's How to Dismantle an Atomic Bomb album for which he won a Grammy. Gogerly has since gone on to work alongside producers Steve Lironi, Rick Nowels and Ewan Pearson. He also works closely with Underworld, mixing a number of projects for them including their remix of "Williams Last Words" by the Manic Street Preachers, and has worked on large parts of the 2012 London Olympic Games opening ceremony and Danny Boyle's Frankenstein.

Alongside mixing, Gogerly has also done a number of production/additional production work for a number of artists such as Little Boots, Mumiy Troll and Boxes.

Recent projects have included Danny Boyle's film Trance with Underworld, and mixing Paloma Faith's album Fall to Grace, produced by Nellee Hooper and Jake Gosling.

In 2007, Gogerly opened his own production/mix studio, Hub II, based around an SSL AWS 900+.

== Selected credits list ==
=== 1980s ===
- The Farm – "All Together Now"
- Soul II Soul – "Missing You"
- Dead or Alive – Nude

=== 1990s ===
- New Order – Republic
- Nigel Kennedy – Ginger
- Texas – The Hush
- Stereophonics – "Not Up To You" (Remix)
- The Other Two – The Other Two & You
- Mark Morrison – Crazy
- Busta Rhymes – "Dangerous" and "Put Your Hands Where My Eyes Could See"
- Another Level – "Guess I Was A Fool"
- Peter Gabriel – "Suzanne" (Programming)
- Texas – "Say What You Want"
- Jamiroquai – "Supersonic" (remix)

=== 2000s ===
- Placebo – "Black Eyed" (remix)
- No Doubt – "Rocksteady" (record/mix)
- Holly Valance – "Down Boy" (single mix)
- Lamb – Gabriel
- P. Diddy – "Lets Get Ill"
- Massive Attack – "What Your Soul Sings"
- Gwen Stefani – "Love. Angel. Music. Baby."
- U2 – How to Dismantle an Atomic Bomb
- Mary J. Blige – One
- Yusuf Islam – An Other Cup
- Andrea Corr – Ten Feet High
- Tracey Thorn – Out of the Woods
- Valeriya – Out Of Control
- Tom Jones – "Sugar Daddy"
- Mumiy Troll – "8"
- Little Boots – "Illuminations"
- Manic Street Preachers – "Williams Last Words" (Underworld Remix)
- N-Dubz – "I Need You"
- Athlete – "Somewhere Beneath My Skin"
- Underworld – "Frankenstein"
- Underworld – "2012 Summer Olympics opening ceremony"
- Underworld – Isles of Wonder
- Underworld – Barking
- Paloma Faith – Fall to Grace
- Josh Kumra – Good Things Come To Those Who Don't Wait
