= Sigma discography =

- Studio albums: 5
- EPs: 9
- Singles: 49
- Music videos: 11
- Other appearances: 3

English drum and bass duo Sigma have released five studio albums, nine extended plays and 49 singles. The duo signed to 3 Beat Records in the summer of 2013. They released their debut single "Summer Calling" with 3Beat featuring vocals from Taylor Fowlis. Their second single "Rudeboy" featuring Doctor was released in December 2013. The song peaked at number 56 on the UK Singles Chart.

Life, Sigma's debut studio album, was released on 4 December 2015. They released the single "Nobody to Love" (a rework of Kanye West's "Bound 2") on 6 April 2014 as the lead single from the album. The song peaked to number one on the UK Singles Chart. In July 2014, Sigma released the single "Changing" featuring vocals from Paloma Faith as the second single from the album. The song became their second consecutive number one single in the UK. "Higher" featuring vocals from Labrinth was released as the third single from the album. The song premiered on Annie Mac's Radio 1 show on 16 January 2015 and peaked to number 12 on the UK Singles Chart. On 24 July 2015, "Glitterball" featuring vocals from Ella Henderson was the fourth single from their debut studio album.

== Studio albums ==
| Title | Details | Peak chart positions | | | | Certifications |
| Title | Details | UK | UK Dance | BEL (Fl) | SCO | Certifications |
|---|---|---|---|---|---|---|
| Life | Released: 4 December 2015; Label: 3Beat; Format: Digital download, CD | 28 | 2 | 74 | 39 | BPI: Gold |
| Hope | Released: 17 June 2022; Label: 3Beat; Format: Digital download, CD | — | 3 | — | — | |
| London Sound | Released: 26 January 2024; Label: 3Beat; Format: Digital download, CD | — | 3 | — | — | |
| Day One | Released: 10 October 2025; Label: Day Ones; Format: Digital download, CD | — | 3 | — | — | |
| Country Greaze | Released: 13 November 2026; Label: Day Ones; Format: Digital download, CD | — | — | — | — | |

== Extended plays ==
| Title | Details | Track listing |
|---|---|---|
| El Presidente | Released: 2007; Label: Bingo Beats; Format: Digital download | 1. "El Presidente"; 2. "All Blue" |
| El Presidente (VIP) | Released: 2009; Label: Life; Format: Digital download | 1. "El Presidente" (VIP); 2. "Something Special" |
| Nexus | Released: 2009; Label: Life; Format: Digital download | 1. "Nexus"; 2. "Front to Back" |
| Stand Tall (Part 1) | Released: 2010; Label: Breakbeat Kaos; Format: Digital download | 1. "Front to Back" (Original Sin remix); 2. "Baltimore" |
| Stand Tall (Part 2) | Released: 2010; Label: Breakbeat Kaos; Format: Digital download | 1. "Stronger"; 2. "The Jungle" |
| Night & Day (Part 1) | Released: 2011; Label: Life; Format: Digital download | 1. "Night & Day"; 2. "The Jungle" (Subzero remix) |
| Night & Day (Part 2) | Released: 2011; Label: Life; Format: Digital download | 1. "Do You Love"; 2. "Loving Me"; 3. "Do You Love" (Subscape remix) |
| Rudeboy (VIP) | Released: 2014; Label: Life; Format: Digital download | 1. "Rudeboy" (VIP); 2. "All Because of You"; 3. "Energize" |
| Life (remixes) | Released: 2017; Label: 3Beat; Format: Digital download, streaming | 1. "Slow Down" (Calyx & TeeBee Remix) [feat. Jetta]; 2. "Lost Away" (Hybrid Minds Remix) [feat. Shakka]; 3. "Lighters" (G Dub Remix) [feat. Majestic]; 4. "Beyond The Wall" (Annix Remix); 5. "Stay" (Pegboard Nerds Remix); 6. "Beyond The Wall" (The Prototypes Remix) |

== Singles ==
=== As lead artist ===
| Title | Year | Peak chart positions | | | | | | | | | | | Certifications | Album |
| Title | Year | UK | UK Dance | AUS | AUT | BEL (Fl) | DEN | GER | IRE | NL | NZ | SCO | Certifications | Album |
|---|---|---|---|---|---|---|---|---|---|---|---|---|---|---|
| "Lassitude" (with DJ Fresh featuring Koko) | 2010 | 98 | 11 | — | — | — | — | — | — | — | — | — | | Kryptonite |
| "Rudeboy" (featuring Doctor) | 2013 | 56 | 12 | — | — | — | — | — | — | — | — | — | | Life |
| "Nobody to Love" | 2014 | 1 | 1 | 11 | 4 | 2 | 21 | 7 | 3 | 14 | 1 | 1 | BPI: 2× Platinum; ARIA: Platinum; RMNZ: 2× Platinum | Life |
| "Changing" (featuring Paloma Faith) | 2014 | 1 | 1 | 19 | 32 | 4 | 33 | 87 | 8 | 54 | 9 | 1 | BPI: 2× Platinum; ARIA: Gold; RMNZ: Platinum | Life |
| "Higher" (featuring Labrinth) | 2015 | 12 | 1 | 72 | — | 47 | — | — | 53 | — | — | 6 | BPI: Silver | Life |
| "Glitterball" (featuring Ella Henderson) | 2015 | 4 | 2 | — | 66 | 34 | — | 64 | 20 | — | — | 1 | BPI: Platinum | Life |
| "Redemption" (with Diztortion featuring Jacob Banks) | 2015 | 138 | — | — | — | 31 | — | — | — | — | — | — | | Life |
| "Coming Home" (with Rita Ora) | 2015 | 15 | 3 | 97 | — | 13 | — | — | 54 | — | — | 9 | BPI: Platinum; RMNZ: Gold | Life |
| "Stay" | 2016 | 178 | — | — | — | — | — | — | — | — | — | — | | Life |
| "Nightingale" | 2016 | — | — | — | — | — | — | — | — | — | — | — | | Non-album single |
| "Cry" (featuring Take That) | 2016 | 21 | 7 | — | — | — | — | — | 65 | — | — | 6 | BPI: Silver | Wonderland (Deluxe edition) |
| "Find Me" (featuring Birdy) | 2016 | 36 | 9 | — | — | — | — | — | 45 | — | — | 21 | BPI: Gold; RMNZ: Gold | Hope |
| "Forever" (featuring Quavo and Sebastian Kole) | 2017 | — | — | — | — | — | — | — | — | — | — | — | | Non-album single |
| "Anywhere" | 2018 | 90 | — | — | — | — | — | — | 57 | — | — | — | BPI: Silver | Hope |
| "Say It" (with Thandi Phoenix) | 2019 | — | — | — | — | — | — | — | — | — | — | — | | Thandi Phoenix |
| "Here We Go Again" (featuring Louisa) | 2019 | 98 | — | — | — | — | — | — | — | — | — | — | | Hope |
| "Dilemma" | 2019 | — | — | — | — | — | — | — | — | — | — | 34 | | Hope |
| "You and Me as One" (with Jack Savoretti) | 2019 | — | — | — | — | — | — | — | — | — | — | — | | Hope |
| "Sell My Soul" (featuring Maverick Sabre) | 2019 | — | — | — | — | — | — | — | — | — | — (Note: "Sell My Soul" did not enter the NZ Top 40 Singles Chart, but peaked at number 40 on the NZ Hot Singles Chart.) | — | | Hope |
| "2 Hearts" (with Sam Feldt featuring Gia Koka) | 2020 | — | — | — | — | — | — | — | — | — | — | — | | Hope |
| "Rest of My Life" (with Shakka) | 2020 | — | — | — | — | — | — | — | — | — | — | — | | Non-album single |
| "High on You" (with John Newman) | 2020 | — | — | — | — | — | — | — | — | — | — | — | | Hope |
| "Hope" (featuring Carla Marie Williams) | 2021 | — | — | — | — | — | — | — | — | — | — | — | | Hope |
| "Faded" (featuring Lowes and U137) | 2021 | — | — | — | — | — | — | — | — | — | — | — | | Hope |
| "Can't Get Enough" (featuring Taet) | 2022 | — | — | — | — | — | — | — | — | — | — | — | | Hope |
| "Give It to Me" (featuring Kelly Kiara and ZieZie) | 2022 | — | — | — | — | — | — | — | — | — | — | — | | Hope |
| "99 Degrees" (with Crvvcks and Clementine Douglas) | 2022 | — | — | — | — | — | — | — | — | — | — | — | | Non-album singles |
| "Little Things" (with Queen Millz) | 2022 | — | — | — | — | — | — | — | — | — | — | — | | Non-album singles |
| "Living for the Moment" (with Yola Recoba) | 2022 | — | — | — | — | — | — | — | — | — | — | — | | Non-album singles |
| "Trouble You" (with Watch the Ride and Doktor) | 2023 | — | — | — | — | — | — | — | — | — | — | — | | London Sound |
| "Adrenaline Rush" (featuring Morgan) | 2023 | — | — | — | — | — | — | — | — | — | — (Note: "Adrenaline Rush" did not enter the NZ Top 40 Singles Chart, but peaked at number 22 on the NZ Hot Singles Chart.) | — | | London Sound |
| "City Lights" (with Gardna) | 2023 | — | — | — | — | — | — | — | — | — | — | — | | London Sound |
| "The Corner" (featuring Joe Devlin) | 2023 | — | — | — | — | — | — | — | — | — | — | — | | London Sound |
| "Going Out to the Ravers" (featuring Everyone You Know) | 2023 | — | — | — | — | — | — | — | — | — | — | — | | London Sound |
| "Run From You" (with Grace Grundy) | 2023 | — | — | — | — | — | — | — | — | — | — | — | | London Sound |
| "Badman" (with B Live 247) | 2023 | — | — | — | — | — | — | — | — | — | — | — | | London Sound |
| "Someone to Hold On To" (with Crystal Fighters) | 2024 | — | — | — | — | — | — | — | — | — | — | — | | London Sound |
| "Kenny" (with Slay) | 2024 | — | — | — | — | — | — | — | — | — | — | — | | Non-album single |
| "Chargie" (with Scrufizzer and Jamakabi) | 2025 | — | — | — | — | — | — | — | — | — | — | — | | Day One |
| "Chemicals" (with Mali-Koa) | 2025 | — | — | — | — | — | — | — | — | — | — | — | | Day One |
| "Superstylin'" (with Danny Byrd and Basslayerz) | 2025 | — | — | — | — | — | — | — | — | — | — | — | | Day One |
| "R U Sleeping" (with Dizzee Rascal and Coco) | 2025 | — | — | — | — | — | — | — | — | — | — | — | | Day One |
| "Jungle" (with Stefflon Don and Yung Saber) | 2025 | — | — | — | — | — | — | — | — | — | — | — | | Day One |
| "Magnetic" (with Julia Church) | 2025 | — | — | — | — | — | — | — | — | — | — | — | | Day One |
| "Up All Night" (with Gardna) | 2025 | — | — | — | — | — | — | — | — | — | — | — | | Day One |
| "Only You" (with Sacha) | 2025 | — | — | — | — | — | — | — | — | — | — | — | | Day One |
| "Soundboy" (with Sweetie Irie and Jamakabi) | 2025 | — | — | — | — | — | — | — | — | — | — | — | | Day One |
| "Legendary Status" (with Danny Byrd, Kurupt FM and Natty D featuring Klaudia Keziah) | 2026 | — | — | — | — | — | — | — | — | — | — | — | | Country Greaze |
| "Need U Now" (with Dutch & Graft and Professor Green) | 2026 | — | — | — | — | — | — | — | — | — | — | — | | Country Greaze |
| "Back 2 Life" (with Soul II Soul, Capo Lee, Liv Campbell and Zimma) | 2026 | — | — | — | — | — | — | — | — | — | — | — | | Country Greaze |
| "Watchin' U" (with America Foster) | 2026 | — | — | — | — | — | — | — | — | — | — | — | | Country Greaze |
"—" denotes a single that did not chart or was not released.

=== Promotional singles ===
| Title | Year | Album |
|---|---|---|
| "Summer Calling" (featuring Taylor Fowlis) | 2013 | Non-album singles |
| "Divine" | 2014 | Non-album singles |
| "Life: Album Minimix" | 2015 | Non-album singles |

== Other appearances ==
| Title | Year | Album |
|---|---|---|
| "Paint It Black" | 2009 | Sick Music |
| "Dreams to Reality" (featuring Logistics) | 2011 | Hospitality Drum & Bass 2011 |
| "Summer Days" (featuring Takura) | 2012 | Hospitality Summer Drum & Bass 2012 |

== Productions ==
| Title | Year | Peak chart positions | Credited artist(s) | Album |
| Title | Year | UK | Credited artist(s) | Album |
|---|---|---|---|---|
| "You My Everything" | 2013 | — | Ellie Goulding | Halcyon Days |
| "Good Times" | 2015 | 37 | Ella Eyre | Feline and Life |
| "Say It" | 2019 | — | Thandi Phoenix | |
| "Bad Decisions" | 2019 | — | Professor Green | M.O.T.H. |

== Remixes ==
| Title | Year | Original Artist(s) | Label |
|---|---|---|---|
| "Flawless" | 2009 | State of Mind | SOM |
| "Shut the Lights Off" (with Adam F) | 2009 | Adam F and Horx (featuring Redman) | Breakbeat Kaos |
| "The Lion's Den" | 2009 | The Nextmen | Sanctuary |
| "Broken" | 2009 | McLean | Warner |
| "Rescue Me" | 2010 | Skepta | 3Beat |
| "Not the Drinking" | 2010 | Lauren Pritchard | Island |
| "Barbra Streisand" | 2010 | Duck Sauce | 3Beat |
| "Lassitude" (Sigma VIP mix) | 2010 | Sigma and DJ Fresh | Breakbeat Kaos |
| "We Can Have It All" | 2010 | Danny Byrd | Hospital |
| "Demons" | 2011 | Fenech-Soler | B-Unique |
| "Nilton (The Reason)" | 2011 | Eric Prydz | Ministry of Sound |
| "Special Dedication" | 2011 | DJ Nut Nut | Street Life |
| "Shoot Me Down" | 2011 | Stanton Warriors | Punks |
| "Level Up" | 2011 | Sway (featuring Kelsey) | 3Beat |
| "Somebody to Love" | 2012 | Rusko | Mad Decent / Downtown |
| "Hanging On" | 2012 | Ellie Goulding | Polydor |
| "Shoot Me Down" | 2012 | Stanton Warriors | Punks |
| "Stand Up" | 2012 | Friction vs. Camo & Krooked (featuring Dynamite MC) | Shogun Audio |
| "Special Dedication" | 2013 | DJ Nut Nut | Drum and Bass Arena |
| "Soundbwoy" | 2013 | Stylo G | 3Beat |
| "Can't Get Better Than This" | 2013 | Parachute Youth | Warner |
| "Rudeboy" (VIP mix) | 2013 | Sigma | 3Beat |
| "Bound 2" (Sigma bootleg) | 2014 | Kanye West | Self-released (remade and re-released as "Nobody to Love") |
| "Dibby Dibby Sound" | 2014 | DJ Fresh vs. Jay Fay (featuring Ms. Dynamite) | Ministry of Sound |
| "My Love" | 2014 | Route 94 (featuring Jess Glynne) | Rinse / Virgin EMI |
| "Nobody to Love" (Sigma's Future Jungle Mix) | 2014 | Sigma | 3Beat |
| "Extraordinary" | 2014 | Clean Bandit (featuring Sharna Bass) | Warner / Big Beat |
| "Hideaway" | 2014 | Kiesza | Lokal Legend |
| "Show Me" | 2014 | DJ Zinc | Rinse |
| "Setting Fires | 2016 | The Chainsmokers (featuring XYLØ) | Disruptor / Columbia |
| "Remedy" | 2022 | Leony | Kontor Records |
| "Can't Get Enough" (Sigma VIP) | 2022 | Sigma featuring Taet | 3Beat Productions |
