= Heartlight =

Heartlight may refer to:

- Heartlight (album), a 1982 album by Neil Diamond
  - "Heartlight" (song), the title song
- "Heartlight (Polygon)", a 2013 song by Ts7
- Heartlight (video game), a 1990 puzzle game for Atari 8-bit computers
- Heartlight (novel), a 1990 novel by T. A. Barron
- "Heart Light", a song by H1-Key
