= Are You Not Entertained? =

Single by Dot Rotten

from the album Voices in My Head
- Released: 4 March 2012
- Recorded: 2009
- Genre: Hip hop
- Length: 2:53 (Radio Edit)
- Label: Mercury Records
- Songwriter(s): Joseph Ellis, Tom Barnes, Ben Kohn + Peter Kelleher
- Producer(s): TMS

Dot Rotten singles chronology
"Teardrop" (2011)	"Are You Not Entertained?" (2012)	"Overload" (2012)

"Are You Not Entertained?" is a song by English rapper/producer Dot Rotten. The song was first released on 4 March 2012 in the United Kingdom as the second single from the rapper's upcoming debut studio album, Voices in My Head. The track debuted at number fifty-three on the UK Singles Chart, marking Rotten's second chart appearance after "Teardrop" (#24, 2011); also reaching number twenty-one on the UK R&B Chart.

The song also appeared on the soundtrack of the 2012 Codemasters video game Dirt: Showdown.

== Music video ==
A music video to accompany the release of "Are You Not Entertained?" was first released onto YouTube on 6 January 2012 at a total length of three minutes and two seconds.

== Live performances ==
As part of the Radio 1/Radio 1Xtra Hull takeover, Rotten performed the tracks "Keep it on a Low" and "Are You Not Entertained?" on 28 January – joining DJ Trevor Nelson at Hull University.

== Track listing ==
Digital download
No.	Title	Length
1.	"Are You Not Entertained?" (Radio Edit)	2:53
2.	"Are You Not Entertained?" (Roksonix Remix)	4:09
3.	"Are You Not Entertained?" (DJ Q Remix)	5:04
4.	"Positive Energy"	3:34

== Chart performance ==
Chart (2012)	Peak position
UK Hip Hop/R&B (OCC)	21
UK Singles (The Official Charts Company)	53

== Release history ==
Country	Release date	Format	Label
United Kingdom	4 March 2012	Digital download	Mercury Records
