= Keep It on a Low =

Single by Dot Rotten

from the album Voices in My Head
- Released: 14 November 2011
- Recorded: 2011
- Genre: Grime; electro-grime
- Length: 3:20
- Label: Mercury
- Songwriter(s): Joseph Ellis-Stevenson; Tom Barnes; Ben Kohn; Peter Kelleher
- Producer(s): TMS

Dot Rotten singles chronology
| "A Star" (2008) | "Keep It on a Low" (2011) | "Teardrop" (2011) |

"Keep It on a Low" is a song by English rapper/producer Dot Rotten. The song was first released on 4 November 2011 in the United Kingdom as the lead single from the rapper's debut studio album, Voices in My Head. NME praised the track, describing it as "uplifting, grime-derived pop music in hi-def".

== Track listing ==
Digital download
| No. | Title | Length |
|---|---|---|
| 1. | "Keep It on a Low" | 3:20 |

== Live performances ==
As part of the Radio 1/1Xtra Hull takeover, Rotten performed the tracks "Keep It on a Low" and "Are You Not Entertained" on 28 January – joining DJ Trevor Nelson at Hull University.

== Release history ==
| Country | Release date | Format(s) |
|---|---|---|
| United Kingdom | 4 November 2011 | Digital download |
