= Stay (Sigma song) =

Single by Sigma

from the album Life
- Released: 18 March 2016
- Recorded: 2014–2015
- Length: 4:00
- Label: 3Beat
- Songwriters: Joseph Lenzie; Cameron Edwards; Carl Ryden; Paul Harris; Elizabeth Paige
- Producers: Sigma; Carl Ryden; Paul Harris

Sigma singles chronology
"Coming Home" (2015)	"Stay" (2016)	"Nightingale" (2016)

Music video
- "Stay" on YouTube

"Stay" is a song performed by British drum and bass duo Sigma. The song was released as a digital download on 18 March 2016, through 3 Beat Records as the eighth and final single from their debut studio album Life (2015). The song peaked at number 117 on the UK Singles Chart. The song was written by Sigma, Carl Ryden, Paul Harris and Elizabeth Paige.

== Music video ==
The music video features South African models Liv de Klerk and Nicole Naude, who also starred in the video for Sigma's 2014 single "Nobody to Love".

== Track listing ==
Digital download
No.	Title	Length
1.	"Stay"	4:00

== Charts ==
Chart (2016)	Peak position
UK Singles (OCC)	178

== Release history ==
Region	Date	Format	Label
United Kingdom	18 March 2016	Digital download	3Beat
