= Overload (Dot Rotten song) =

Single by Dot Rotten featuring TMS

from the album Voices in My Head
- Released: 3 June 2012
- Recorded: 2011–2012
- Genre: Dance, dubstep
- Length: 3:05
- Label: Mercury Records
- Songwriter(s): Joseph Ellis, Tom Barnes, Ben Kohn, Louis Gibzen, Peter Kelleher
- Producer(s): TMS

Dot Rotten singles chronology
"Are You Not Entertained?" (2012)	"Overload" (2012)	"Karmageddon" (2012)

TMS singles chronology
"I Need You" (2011)	"Overload" (2012)

"Overload" is a song by English rapper/producer Zeph Ellis as Dot Rotten. The song was first released on 3 June 2012 in the United Kingdom as the third single from the rapper's upcoming debut studio album, Voices in My Head. The track heavily samples "Children"—the number-two hit from trance composer Robert Miles; and credits producers TMS as the featured artist. "Overload" was selected as BBC Radio 1 DJ Zane Lowe's Hottest Record in the World on 26 March 2012. The track debuted at number fifteen on the UK Singles Chart, marking Rotten's third appearance—also the highest peaking of these—after "Teardrop" (#24, 2011) and "Are You Not Entertained?" (#53, 2012).

== Music video ==
A music video to accompany the release of "Overload" was first released onto YouTube on 8 May 2012 at a total length of three minutes and nine seconds.

Sections of the video were filmed in the Snowdonia National Park, around the Ogwen Valley and Nant Ffrancon area.

It was directed by a young British film-director called Quason Matthews.

== Track listing ==
Digital download
No.	Title	Length
1.	"Overload"	3:05
2.	"Overload" (Pyramid Dubstep Remix)	3:34
3.	"Overload" (Pyramid 140 Breaks Mix)	4:43
4.	"Overload" (Cahill Club Remix)	7:18
5.	"Overload" (Cahill Dub Remix)	7:18

== Charts ==
Chart (2012)	Peak position
Scotland (OCC)	20
UK Hip Hop/R&B (OCC)	3
UK Singles (OCC)	15

== Release history ==
Country	Release date	Format	Label
United Kingdom	3 June 2012	Digital download	Mercury Records
