= Third Party (DJs) =

Duo of English DJs and record producers

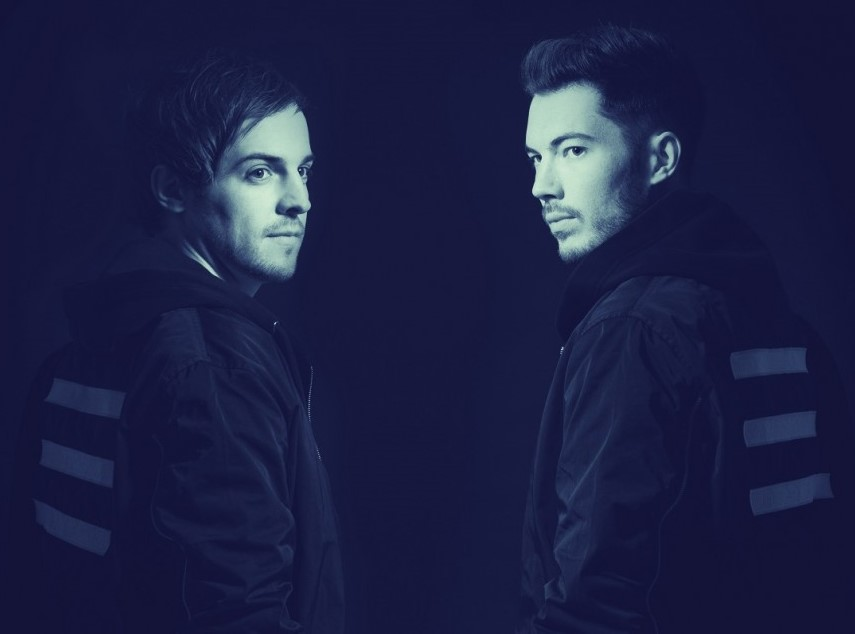

Background information
- Origin: London, UK
- Genres: Progressive house; electro house; Dutch house; big room house
- Occupations: DJs; producers; musicians; songwriters
- Instrument: Digital audio workstation
- Years active: 2010–present
- Labels: Armada; Size; Ultra; Neon; Release
- Members: Jonnie Macaire; Harry Bass

Third Party (stylized as THIRD ≡ PARTY) is a British progressive house DJ duo consisting of Jonnie Macaire and Harry Bass, based in Essex, London. They are best known for their single "Everyday Of My Life" and the collaboration "Lions in the Wild" with Dutch DJ Martin Garrix. They began their musical career as producers by releasing singles and remixes.

== Career ==
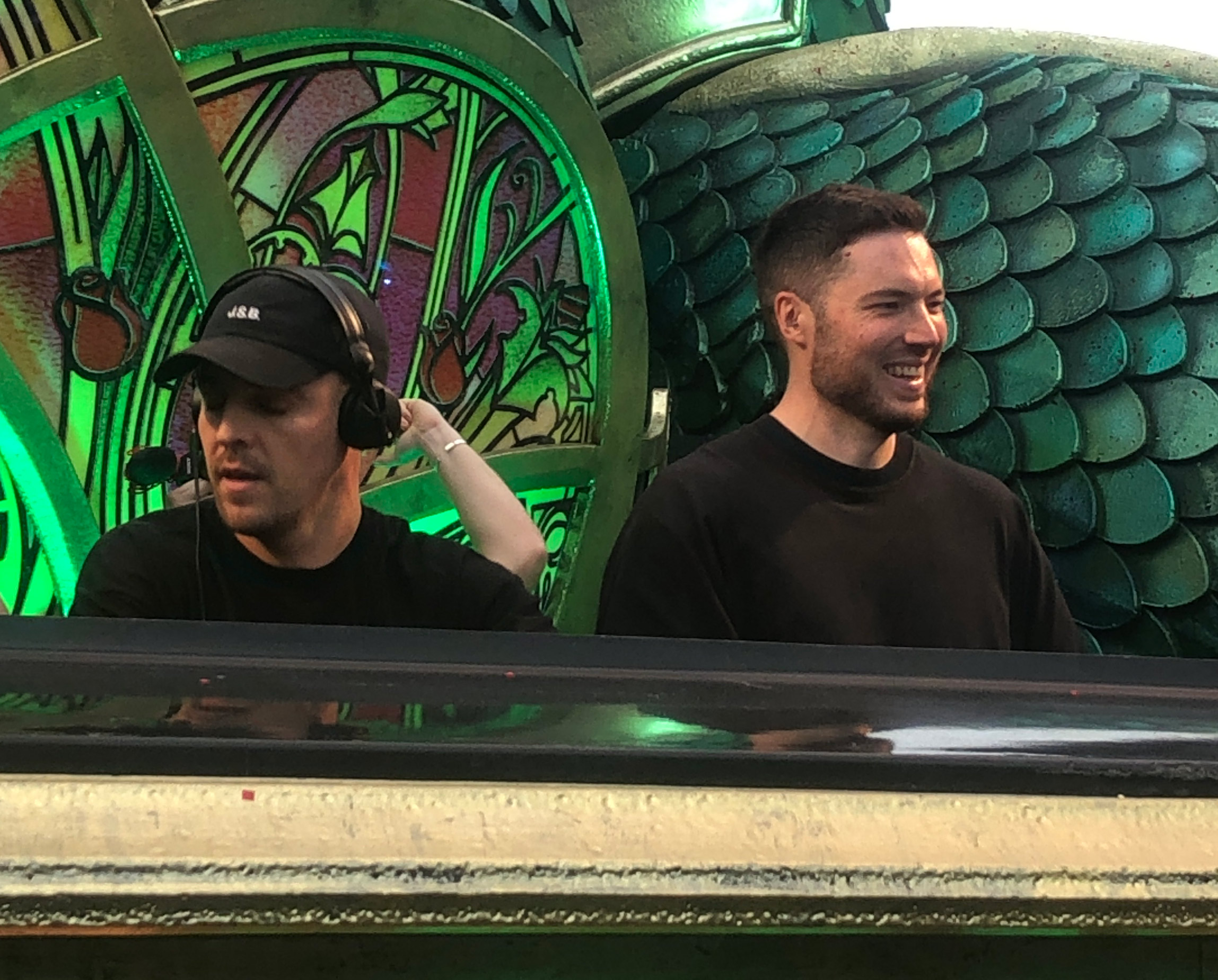
Third Party at Tomorrowland 2023.

The duo met at school and via their mutual interest in music production, they formed Third Party. They pursued further musical education at a music technical college for a year, funding themselves with part-time jobs. They later performed as DJs at local clubs in London while continuing studio production.

In 2012, Third Party released three singles – "Lights" with Steve Angello, "Feel" with Cicada and "Thank You". In 2014, they released "Everyday of My Life" as a single. They founded Release Records, their own record label in 2015, in partnership with Armada Music. Third Party's single "Alive" served as the label's first release. On 27 May 2016, they released "Lions in the Wild" with Martin Garrix. Their debut studio album "Hope", featuring eleven songs was released on 24 February 2017. They began working on the album from late 2015. They are resident DJs at Ministry of Sound club.

== Discography ==
=== Albums ===
Title	Details
Hope	Released: 24 February 2017; Label: Armada Music, Release Records; Format: Digital download, CD
Together	Released: 15 March 2019; Label: Release Records; Format: Digital download

=== Singles ===
Title	Year	Peak chart positions	Album
Title	Year	FRA	Album
"Release"	2010	—	Non-album single
"Lights" (with Steve Angello)	2012	—	Until Now
"Everyday of My Life" (Note: The VIP remix of this song is featured on the album Hope.)	2014	—	Non-album singles
"Collide" (featuring Daniel Gitlund)	2014	—	Non-album singles
"Alive"	2015	—	Non-album singles
"Arrival"	2015	—	Hope
"Nation (Rise Again)" (featuring Daniel Gitlund)	2015	—	Nation - EP
"Waiting"	2015	—	Hope
"Real Sound" (with Sentinel)	2016	—	Non-album single
"Lions in the Wild" (with Martin Garrix)	2016	125	Hope
"Never Let You Go" (with Sem Vox)	2016	—	Non-album single
"Live Forever"	2016	—	Hope
"Start It" (with Sentinel)	2016	—	Non-album single
"Veins"	2017	—	Hope
"Have No Fear"	2017	—	Hope
"Like This" (with Pete K and Cory Lasser)	2017	—	Non-album single
"Free"	2018	—	Together
"Midnight"	2018	—	Together
"Come With Me"	2018	—	Together
"Remember"	2018	—	Together
"Falling" (featuring First State and Anita Kelsey)	2019	—	Together
"Take Me Away"	2020	—	TBA
"We Found Love" (with Gvn featuring Errol Reid)	2020	—	TBA
"—" denotes an album that did not chart or was not released.

=== Remixes ===
2011

- Emeli Sande featuring Naughty Boy – "Daddy" (Third Party Remix)
- Tiesto – What Can We Do (A Deeper Love) (Third Party Remix)

2012

- Sultan + Ned Shepard and Thomas Sagstad featuring Dirty Vegas – "Somebody to Love" (Third Party Remix)
- Wynter Gordon – "Still Getting Younger" (Third Party Remix)
- Swedish House Mafia - "Save The World" (Third Party Remix)

2013

- Red Hot Chili Peppers – "Otherside" (Third Party Remix)

2014

- Sigma – "Nobody to Love" (Third Party Remix)

2015

- Kygo featuring Conrad Sewell – "Firestone" (Third Party Private Remix)

2016

- Corey James and Will K – "Another Storm" (Third Party Unlocked Mix)

2017

- Third Party – "Everyday of My Life" (VIP Mix)

2020

- Armin van Buuren featuring Cimo Fränkel – "All Comes Down" (Third Party Remix)
