= Bitter Sweet Love =

Studio album by James Arthur
- Released: 26 January 2024
- Studio: Miloco (London); Tone Circus (Austin)
- Length: 43:03
- Label: Columbia
- Producer: Red Triangle; Steven Solomon

James Arthur chronology
It'll All Make Sense in the End (2021)	Bitter Sweet Love (2024)	Pisces (2025)

Singles from Bitter Sweet Love
- 1. "A Year Ago" Released: 12 May 2023; 2. "Blindside" Released: 4 August 2023; 3. "Just Us" Released: 6 October 2023; 4. "Homecoming" Released: 24 November 2023; 5. "Sleepwalking" Released: 15 December 2023; 6. "Bitter Sweet Love" Released: 12 January 2024

Singles from Bitter Sweet Love (Deluxe)
- 1. "From the Jump" Released: 19 April 2024

Bitter Sweet Love is the fifth studio album by English singer-songwriter James Arthur, released on 26 January 2024 through Columbia Records. The album, primarily co-written and produced by Steven Solomon, retains Arthur's signature sound, and was preceded by the release of six singles, including the title track, and the lead single "A Year Ago".

The album peaked at number one on the UK Albums Chart, becoming Arthur's second number one album, following Back from the Edge (2016). On June 28, 2024, to accompany Arthur's world tour in promotion of the album, a deluxe edition was released, adding eight new tracks, including covers of Christina Perri's "A Thousand Years" and Shania Twain's "You're Still the One". The deluxe release was preceded by the release of a duet version of "From the Jump" featuring vocals from Kelly Clarkson.

== Critical reception ==
Professional ratings
Review scores
Source	Rating
The Irish Times	2.5/5 stars

Irish Times writer Lauren Murphy rated the album two and a half stars out of five stars. She noted that "Arthur's soulful husky voice continues to be the main quality that sets him apart from the army of Ed Sheerans in operation, but there is only so far it will take him on his fifth album [...] Hollow sloganeering and hackneyed balladry aside, Arthur is more than capable of churning out a decent, lively pop song. There are just not enough of them here to make a lasting impression." Renowned for Sound described Bitter Sweet Love as "a mixture of some decent, upbeat tracks, a couple of tolerable country-light tracks, and a plethora of entirely adequate, yet instantly forgettable, piano-heavy ballads. The up-tempo tracks demonstrate that Arthur can write good pop songs – without these, this album would have been one long, unendurable ballad."

== Track listing ==
Bitter Sweet Love track listing
No.	Title	Writer(s)	Length
1.	"Bitter Sweet Love"	James Arthur; Steven Solomon; Jamie Graham	2:45
2.	"Free Falling"	Arthur; Solomon; Graham	2:53
3.	"Sleepwalking"	Arthur; Solomon; Graham	3:48
4.	"Blindside"	Arthur; Rick Parkhouse; George Tizzard; Wayne Hector	3:32
5.	"Just Us"	Arthur; Solomon; Andrew Jackson	3:34
6.	"Comeback Kid"	Arthur; Solomon	3:53
7.	"From the Jump"	Arthur	3:51
8.	"A Year Ago"	Arthur; Solomon; Graham	2:50
9.	"Ruthless"	Arthur; Solomon; Graham	3:12
10.	"New Generation"	Arthur; Solomon	2:46
11.	"My Favourite Pill"	Arthur; Solomon	3:23
12.	"Is It Alright?"	Arthur; Parkhouse; Tizzard; Hector	3:44
13.	"Homecoming"	Arthur; Solomon; Graham	2:52
Total length:			43:03

iTunes edition bonus tracks
No.	Title	Writer(s)	Length
14.	"A Year Ago" (acoustic version)	Arthur; Graham; Solomon	3:02
15.	"Blindside" (acoustic version)	Arthur; Hector; Parkhouse; Tizzard	3:53
16.	"Just Us" (strings version)	Arthur; Jackson; Solomon	3:34
Total length:			53:32

Bitter Sweet Love (Deluxe) - Disc 2
No.	Title	Writer(s)	Length
1.	"A Thousand Years"	Christina Perri; David Hodges	4:14
2.	"From the Jump" (with Kelly Clarkson)	Arthur	3:51
3.	"You're Still the One"	Shania Twain; Robert John "Mutt" Lange	3:18
4.	"Sinners"	Arthur; Graham; Solomon	3:25
5.	"Brave"	Arthur; Sam de Jong	3:55
6.	"Heartbeat"	Arthur; Dan Bingham; Solomon	3:52
7.	"Blindside" (Orchestral Version live from Channel Aid)	Arthur; Parkhouse; Tizzard; Hector	4:07
8.	"Bitter Sweet Love" (Orchestral Version live from Channel Aid)	Arthur; Graham; Solomon	3:22

== Personnel ==
Musicians

- James Arthur – vocals (all tracks), felt piano (tracks 2, 5), guitars (4, 8)
- Steven Solomon – guitars, keyboards (tracks 1–11, 13); bass (1, 4–7, 10, 11, 13), programming (1–4, 6–11, 13), Juno bass synthesizer (2, 3, 8, 9), piano (7), felt piano (13)
- Daniel Bingham – drums (tracks 1–11, 13), keyboards (1, 3, 5–11, 13), Juno synthesizer (1–3, 5, 6–9, 11, 13), felt piano (7, 13), upright piano (10), piano (12)
- Pete Whitfield – strings (tracks 2, 3, 5, 12, 13)
- Sarah Brandwood-Spencer – strings (tracks 2, 3, 5, 12, 13)
- Simon Turner – strings (tracks 2, 3, 5, 12, 13)
- Rick Parkhouse – bass, keyboards, programming (tracks 4, 12); guitars (4)
- George Tizzard – bass, keyboards, programming (tracks 4, 12); guitars (4)
- Sarah Dorgan – voicemail vocal (track 6)
- John Dempsy – bass guitar (track 9)

Technical

- Steve Solomon – production (tracks 1–11, 13)
- Red Triangle – production (tracks 4, 12)
- Idania Valencia – mastering (tracks 1–7, 9–13)
- Randy Merrill – mastering (track 8)
- Charlie Holmes – mixing (tracks 1–3, 6, 7, 9–13)
- Mark "Spike" Stent – mixing (tracks 4, 5)
- Manny Marroquin – mixing (track 8)
- Chris Galland – mix engineering (track 8)
- Pete Whitfield – string arrangement (tracks 2, 3, 5, 12, 13)
- Daniel Bingham – string arrangement (track 5)
- Matthew Barnes – mixing assistance (tracks 1–3, 6, 7, 9–13)
- Matt Wolach – mixing assistance (tracks 4, 5)
- Ramiro Fernandez-Seoane – mix engineering assistance (track 8)
- John Dempsy – engineering assistance
- Sarah Dorgan – engineering assistance
- Ryan Short – editing assistance

Visuals

- Drinkwater Studio – creative direction, design
- Edward Cooke – photography

== Charts ==
Chart performance for Bitter Sweet Love
Chart (2024)	Peak position
Austrian Albums (Ö3 Austria)	29
Belgian Albums (Ultratop Flanders)	33
Belgian Albums (Ultratop Wallonia)	122
Dutch Albums (Album Top 100)	43
French Physical Albums (SNEP)	133
German Albums (Offizielle Top 100)	12
Irish Albums (OCC)	15
Polish Albums (ZPAV)	87
Portuguese Albums (AFP)	38
Scottish Albums (OCC)	2
Swiss Albums (Schweizer Hitparade)	8
UK Albums (OCC)	1

== Certifications ==
Certifications for Bitter Sweet Love
Region	Certification	Certified units/sales
United Kingdom (BPI)	Silver	60,000^{‡}
^{‡} Sales+streaming figures based on certification alone.
