= Kid Bookie =

English rock musician (born 1992)

- Born: Tyronne Buddy-Lee Ike Hill; 19 April 1992 (age 34)
- Origin: London, England
- Genres: Hip-hop; alternative hip-hop; trap metal; rap rock; rock
- Occupations: Singer; rapper; guitarist
- Instruments: Vocals; guitar
- Years active: 2009–present
- Label: Frontiers Music

Tyronne Buddy-Lee Ike Hill (19 April 1992), better known by his stage name Kid Bookie, is an English rock singer and rapper from South East London.

== Biography ==
Kid Bookie's first foray into music began at school where he played guitar in local South London bands. Whilst growing up his family, and in particular his father, introduced him to hip-hop and during his teens it became his most prominent genre of interest. His work in this space ultimately resulted in him befriending and collaborating with rapper Dot Rotten. Rotten is credited with giving Kid Bookie his first mainstream moment by bringing the then 16 year old Bookie on to perform live on BBC Radio 1 Xtra. Around this time he also released his first grime mix-tape entitled 'In The Making' which was met with critical reviews from his peers.

Whilst working as part of Dot Rotten's minarmy Kid Bookie forged connections and collaborated with a range of established artists including D12 members Kuniva and Swifty McVay, Slaughterhouse's Crooked I as well as popstar Samantha Mumba. These efforts ultimately resulted in a track entitled 'Evolution' which also featured Scrufizzer, Lady Leshurr and indeed Dot Rotten himself. The track premiered on BBC 1Xtra with DJ Cameo on 7 July 2014 and has since then been reworked with underground producer Teeza, the video for which premiered on the UK music platform, SB.TV.

In 2016, Kid Bookie released his second mixtape entitled 'You'll Rate Me When I'm Dead'. The lead single 'Premonition' ft. Nasaan, Dot Rotten & Christie was accompanied by a music video which picked up A-List support at The Box and Kiss TV. The track 'Hey' from this mixtape was later remixed for an official release with the added feature of D12's Swifty Mcvay

2018 saw Bookie collaborate with Relentless Energy Drink to release his second mixtape ‘Publish This’. At this time he was also approached by Krayzie Bone of Bone Thugs-n-Harmony to open on the European leg of their world tour.

Kid Bookie released the 'Shake UP' EP on 31 July 2018 which was accompanied by an audio advert in which he targets Chris & Kem for having no 'honorary contributions to the culture'. Shortly after, the self titled 'underground album' Publish This was released on 12 December 2018 attracting underground media attention with Complex (Magazine) citing it as an 'essential listen'.

On 5 February 2019, it was announced that Kid Bookie & Slipknot and Stone Sour frontman Corey Taylor were working on some "very special music" via a series of back and forth tweets on the social media platform Twitter. On 25 March the song "Stuck in my ways" was released featuring Taylor rapping the second verse. A music video for the song was released on 18 April.

Kid Bookie was somewhat quiet in 2019 only releasing 2 songs throughout the year, 'Fur Minxxx' being the latter of the records. At the beginning of 2020 he embarked on a nationwide Kerrang! tour (which was cut short due to a global coronavirus pandemic) and started to tease music from a potential album, working with Good Charlotte's Billy Martin amongst others on the project. He is featured on Corey Taylor's debut solo album 'CMFT' on the song 'CMFT Must Be stopped' alongside Tech N9ne. Tech N9ne and Kid Bookie also came together for a single release taken from Kid Bookie's album 'Cheaper Than Therapy', the single was released Friday, 13 November 2020.

2021 saw the release of Kid Bookie's 'Cheaper Than Therapy' with features ranging from Corey Taylor & Sid Wilson of Slipknot, Tech N9ne and more. It peaked in the UK rock charts for iTunes at number 7, number 3 in Ireland and number 41 in Australia and number 64 overall in all genre's for UK. The album also held Amazon's number 1 best sellers in hip-hop for a week.

Kid Bookie released 'Mass Hysteria' on 7 October 2022, with 3 singles released prior which were 'Game' Ft. Corey Taylor & Let It Ring featuring Ziey Kizzy. There were also talks of a new 'Teenage Dirtbag' record being made with Wheatus which started to appear around October with Kid Bookie & Wheatus talking live on Knotfest about their love of the new version, with Bookie mentioning it in interviews with a release date recently being confirmed for 29 November 2022, titled 'Bookies Dirtbag'.

Kid Bookie was nominated for a MOBO (Mobo Awards) for the first ever 'Best Alternative Act' for the inaugural 2022 awards ceremony. Bookie called it "a testament to staying true to your nature" due to many years of fighting and demanding change for the trajectory of rock music, helped gratuitously by the Nova Twins with their open letter for rock inclusion, it saw a wealth of alternative acts put forward to solidify pioneers of alternative culture. He was nominated for the 2024 MOBO (Mobo Awards) as 'Best Alternative Act' for the second time of the nominee groups inception. He was also an extra in Harry Potter Order of the Phoenix.

He released his album Songs For The Living/Songs For The Dead on September, 13th via Marshall Records to 'critical acclaim'. Peaking at number 2 in the rock charts only to be topped by David Gilmour of Pink Floyd, whilst end of week Official Charts Company (OCC) results were met at #33 Official Record Store chart, #43 Independent Albums Chart and #15 Official Album Breakers Chart.

In 2025 he announced Cheaper Than Therapy 2 album, a continuation from his 2021 'Cheaper Than Therapy' album series citing guests such as Rose McGowan, Lady Leshurr and more.

== Discography ==
=== Singles ===
- 2014: "Evolution 2.0 The Temix" (Featuring) Samantha Mumba, Kuniva, Crooked I, Scrufizzer, Lady Leshurr & Dot Rotten
- 2015: "Grown" (Featuring) Christie
- 2016: "Go to Work" (Featuring) Lovelle
- 2018: "Who's Next?"
- 2019: "Stuck in My Ways" (Featuring) Corey Taylor
- 2019: "Fur Minxxx"
- 2020: "Say It with Your Chest" (Featuring) Kamiyada
- 2020: "Liquor Sex Weed"
- 2020: "On My Rock" (Featuring) Billy Martin (guitarist) of Good Charlotte
- 2020: "In My Soul" (Featuring) Tech N9ne
- 2021: "In the Dark" (Featuring) Òlah Bliss
- 2021: "Like I"
- 2021: "Crazy" (Featuring) BEXEY
- 2022: "Game" (Featuring) Corey Taylor
- 2022: "Let It Ring" (Featuring) Ziey Kizzy
- 2022: "Bookies Dirtbag" (Featuring) Wheatus
- 2023: "AI (Save Yourself)"
- 2024: "Scars"
- 2024: "Love Me When You're Angry" (Featuring) Ziey Kizzy
- 2025: "Get Out" (Featuring) Griffin Taylor
- 2026: "Rose McGowan" (Featuring) Rose McGowan
- 2026: "BLAME" (Featuring) Corey Taylor

=== EPs ===
- 2014: Throw Away Music EP
- 2018: Shake Up EP
- 2022: Mass Hysteria EP

=== Mixtapes ===
- 2014: Some Kind of Hate
- 2016: You'll Rate Me When I'm Dead

=== Albums ===
- 2018: Publish This
- 2021: Cheaper Than Therapy
- 2024: Songs for the Living/Songs for the Dead
- 2026: Cheaper Than Therapy II

=== Featured songs ===
- 2014: "Where ever I Fall 2.0" - Richard Osborne featuring Kid Bookie and Scorcher
- 2019: "Wake up.kill.repeat"- Code:pandorum featuring Kid Bookie
- 2020: "Streets of rage"- Code:pandorum featuring Kid Bookie
- 2020: "CMFT Must Be Stopped" - Corey Taylor featuring Tech N9ne and Kid Bookie
- 2020: "Come Alive" - Twiztid featuring Kid Bookie & Young Wicked
- 2020: "Armoured Core" - Hacktivist featuring Kid Bookie
- 2021: "Background Sad" - Icon for Hire featuring Kid Bookie

== Awards and nominations ==
Year	Organization	Work	Award	Result	Ref.
2022	Mobo Awards	Kid Bookie	Best Alternative Music Act	Nominated	

Year	Organization	Work	Award	Result	Ref.
2023	Heavy Music Awards	Kid Bookie	Best British Breakthrough	Nominated	
