= Pisces (James Arthur album) =

Studio album by James Arthur
- Released: 25 April 2025
- Studios: Miloco (London); Wendy House (London); The Beach (London)
- Genre: Pop rock
- Length: 39:27
- Label: Columbia
- Producers: Steven Solomon; TMS

James Arthur chronology
Bitter Sweet Love (2024)	Pisces (2025)

Singles from Pisces
- 1. "ADHD" Released: 22 November 2024; 2. "Celebrate" Released: 17 January 2025; 3. "Embers" Released: 14 February 2025; 4. "Karaoke" Released: 7 March 2025; 5. "Cruel" Released: 25 April 2025

Pisces (stylised in all caps) is the sixth studio album by English singer-songwriter James Arthur, released on 25 April 2025 through Columbia Records. It serves as the follow-up to his fifth studio album, Bitter Sweet Love (2024), and was preceded by the four singles "ADHD", "Celebrate", "Embers", "Karaoke", and "Cruel". Production was handled by Steven Solomon, aside from the track "Water", which was produced by TMS.

In its first week, the album debuted at number three on the UK Albums Chart, marking his sixth top three album in the country. He also embarked on The Pisces World Tour, which began in May 2025 and concluded in February 2026.

== Background ==
Pisces was initially slated for a 21 March release, though was pushed back due to the visual album not being completely finished. He titled the album after his astrological sign, feeling very connected to it with the qualities of being "caught between reality and fantasy".

Arthur shared that Pisces was his most personal project to date, and aimed to distinguish it from his previous works. He explained of the album's sonic approach: "I wanted this album to have a different feel from anything I've done before. People expect big, emotional ballads with raspy vocals, but I like to think I've got a few strings to my bow. It was as simple as wanting to approach the songs and my vocal delivery in a more gentle way and create dreamy sounds".

== Track listing ==
All tracks are written by James Arthur with co-writers noted.

Pisces track listing
No.	Title	Writer(s)	Length
1.	"Summer"	Steven Solomon; Jack Duxbury; Andrew Jackson	3:06
2.	"Cruel"	Solomon; Daniel Bingham	3:00
3.	"All My Love"	Solomon; Bingham; Duxbury	3:07
4.	"ADHD"	Solomon; Bingham	3:48
5.	"Gucci (Interlude)"		1:23
6.	"Celebrate"	Solomon	3:40
7.	"F.R.I.E.N.D.S"	Solomon; Bingham	3:35
8.	"Embers"	Solomon; Luke Higgins	4:15
9.	"Karaoke"	George Tizzard; Rick Parkhouse; Niamh Murphy	3:41
10.	"Yeah, No"	Solomon	2:47
11.	"Water"	Benjamin Kohn; Peter Kelleher; Thomas Barnes; Alex O'Shaughnessy	3:07
12.	"Hallelujah"	Solomon; Bingham	3:58
Total length:			39:27

=== Note ===
- "Karaoke" is stylised in all caps.

== Personnel ==
Credits adapted from the album's liner notes.

=== Musicians ===
- James Arthur – vocals, guitars
- Steven Solomon – guitars, programming (tracks 1–10, 12); bass (1–10), keyboards (2, 10), banjo (7), drums (12)
- Daniel Bingham – keyboards (tracks 1–4, 6–8, 12), drums (1–4, 6–8), synthesizer (4)
- Jack Duxbury – keyboards, programming (tracks 1, 3, 8)
- Samuel Ewens – trumpet, valve trombone (tracks 2, 8); French horn, brass arrangement (8)
- Luke Higgins – guitars (track 8)
- Rick Parkhouse – guitars, bass, programming (track 9)
- George Tizzard – guitars, keyboards (track 9)
- Peter Kelleher – bass (track 11)
- Ben Kohn – keyboards (track 11)
- Dave Eggar – strings, string arrangement (track 11)
- Chuck Palmer – string arrangement (track 11)
- Katie Thomas – strings (track 11)
- Matt Smile – additional string orchestration (track 11)
- Benjamin Francis – additional string orchestration (track 11)
- Pete Whitfield – string arrangement, violins (track 12)
- Sarah Brandwood-Spencer – violins (track 12)
- Simon Turner – cello (track 12)

=== Technical ===
- Steven Solomon – production, vocal production (tracks 1–3, 5–10, 12)
- TMS – production (track 11)
- Jon Castelli – mixing (tracks 1–10, 12)
- Mark "Spike" Stent – mixing (track 11)
- Dale Becker – mastering
- James Arthur – vocal production (tracks 1–3, 5–10, 12)
- Red Triangle – vocal production (track 9)
- Chris Bishop – engineering (track 10)
- Dave Eggar – string engineering and recording (track 10)
- Matt Smile – string engineering and recording (track 10)
- Linda Caldwell – string engineering and recording (track 10)
- Brad Lauchert – mixing assistance (tracks 1–10, 12)
- Kieran Beardmore – mixing assistance (track 11)
- Sarah Dorgan – recording assistance (tracks 1–10, 12)

=== Visuals ===
- Drinkwater Studios – creative direction, design
- Edward Cooke – photography

== Charts ==
Chart performance for Pisces
Chart (2025)	Peak position
Austrian Albums (Ö3 Austria)	15
Belgian Albums (Ultratop Flanders)	78
Dutch Albums (Album Top 100)	51
German Albums (Offizielle Top 100)	34
Scottish Albums (Official Charts)	6
Swiss Albums (Schweizer Hitparade)	27
UK Albums (Official Charts)	3
