= Zeph Ellis =

British rapper (1988–2026)

Dot Rotten
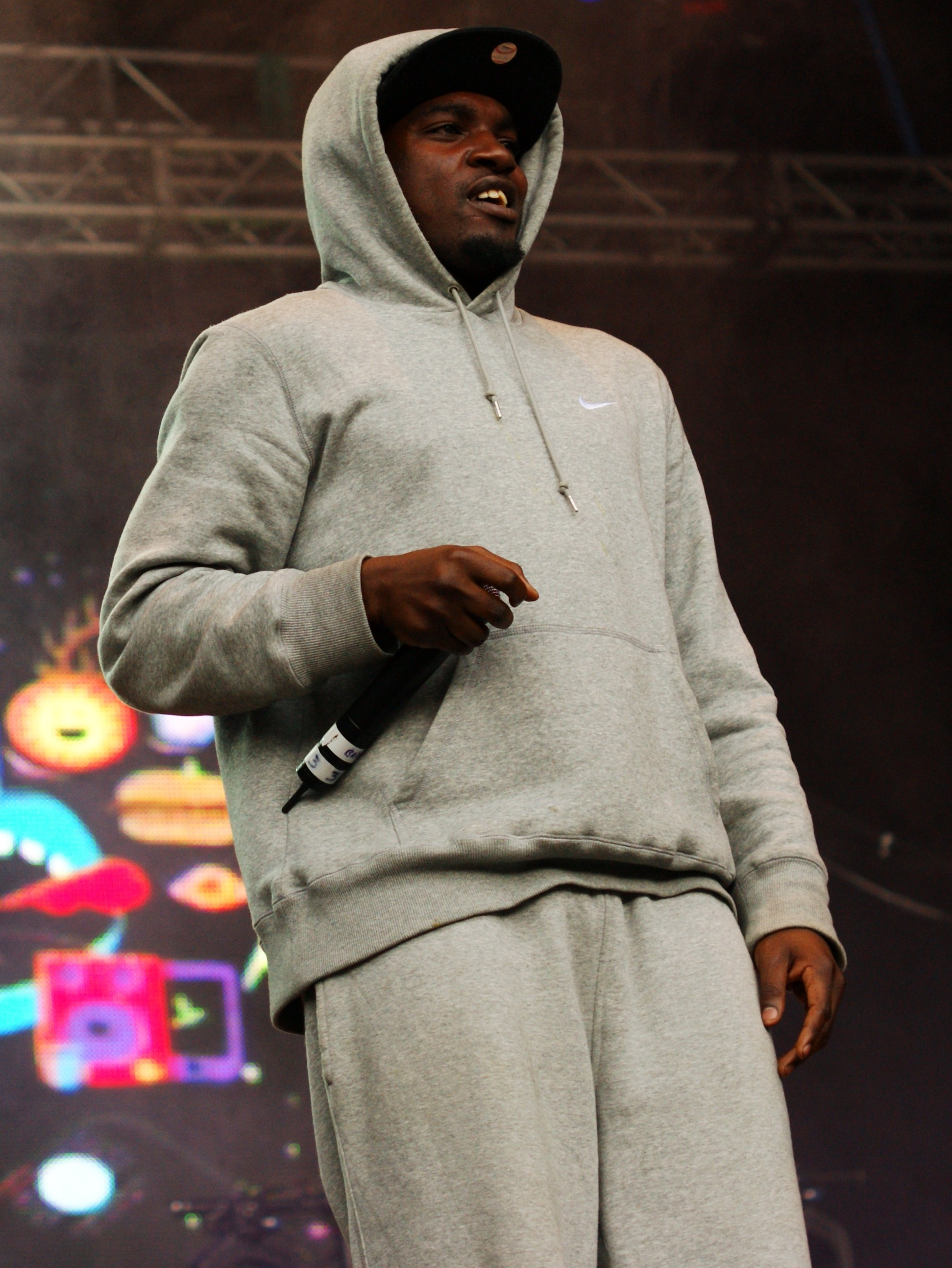
- Dot Rotten in 2011

Background information
- Also known as: T Dot; Young Dot; Dot Rotten; SuperGrxme; Rottimeus; Who's British?; Biological father of Grime
- Born: Joseph Daniel Joel Ellis-Stephenson; 19 October 1988; London, England
- Died: 8 March 2026 (aged 37) Gambia
- Genres: British hip-hop; grime
- Occupations: Rapper; singer; songwriter; record producer
- Instrument: Vocals
- Years active: 2004–2026
- Labels: Rotten Riddims; Minarmy; Mercury
- Website: producerzeph.store

Joseph Daniel Joel Ellis-Stephenson (19 October 1988 – 8 March 2026), better known by his stage names Zeph Ellis, Dot Rotten and latterly, Who's British was a British MC, rapper, singer, songwriter and record producer from Lambeth, South London.

Having released a series of mixtapes independently under the names Young Dot and later Dot Rotten, Ellis signed to Mercury Records, releasing his debut studio album Voices in My Head in 2013. After leaving the major label, he released several independent EPs and projects. Later he changed his name to Zeph Ellis and focussed on producing.

Ellis was known for having introduced various sampling techniques to grime production, and creating the style of singing hooks on grime tracks. These styles can be heard throughout his discography from the early Young Dot era to his later projects under the Zeph Ellis moniker.

== Life and career ==
=== Early life ===
Ellis was born in London, England on 19 October 1988.

=== 2004–2008: Early career and first name change ===
Ellis began rapping at the age of seven, using an Atari model as a basis for music production. Under the name Young Dot, he released his first self-produced mixtape in 2007, entitled This Is The Beginning.

The following year saw Ellis abandon the moniker and adopt a new guise, Dot Rotten. The name change was followed by a second self-produced mixtape entitled R.I.P. Young Dot, released in July 2008. This year also saw the release of Rotten Riddims, an instrumental series spanning six volumes. These featured a host of new material, as well as instrumentals that Ellis had previously made and used in his Young Dot era. Volume 7 was eventually released in 2014 as a free download.

=== 2008–2011: Mixtapes and collaborations ===
The following year, Ellis released two mixtapes within two months, entitled S.O.O.N (Something Out of Nothing) and Extra Attention. Production was primarily handled by Dot himself, but also featured instrumentals by Rude Kid, Faith SFX and Dizzee Rascal. Guest vocalists included members of the Grime collective that he was part of known as Hoodstars Ice Kid (Ice-Kid), & MEGA12, as well as long time collaborators Voltage, Brutal and Shimmer.

=== 2011–2013: Breakthrough and Voices in My Head ===
2011 saw Dot Rotten sign his first major label deal with Mercury Records. During this year he made several guest appearances, including on Ed Sheeran's No. 5 Collaborations Project ("Goodbye to You"), Mz. Bratt's Elements mixtape ("Speeding By") and Cher Lloyd's Sticks + Stones ("Dub on the Track"). He also appeared on the Children in Need 2011 charity single, "Teardrop". Under the name 'The Collective', Rotten appeared as one of many artists assembled by Take That member Gary Barlow, which included Chipmunk, Wretch 32, Mz. Bratt, Labrinth, Rizzle Kicks, Ed Sheeran, Ms. Dynamite and Tulisa Contostavlos. The single, which was performed both at Children in Need 2011 and Children in Need Rocks Manchester in November 2011 debuted at number 24 on the UK Singles Chart; marking Dot Rotten's first chart appearance. An EP entitled Above The Waves was self-released in June 2014 featuring the lead track, "Normal Human Being".

The rapper proceeded to release his debut single on 4 November 2011, entitled "Keep It on a Low". It was announced on 5 December that Dot Rotten had been nominated for the BBC's poll Sound of 2012. The rapper's second single, "Are You Not Entertained?" was released on 4 March 2012, following a premiere from BBC Radio 1 DJ Zane Lowe on 4 January. "Are You Not Entertained?" debuted at number fifty-three on the UK Singles Chart and number twenty-one on the UK R&B Chart – marking Rotten's first chart appearance as a solo artist. The rapper's third single, "Overload", was released in the United Kingdom on 28 May 2012. Sampling the 1996 number-two hit "Children", by Robert Miles, the track was selected as Zane Lowe's Hottest Record in the World. "Overload" debuted at number fifteen on the UK chart, also debuting at number three on the R&B chart. In march 2013 Dot Rotten featured on Kid Bookie's "Evolution" produced by Flava D alongside Griminal, Brotherhood, Pawz and Maxsta. His debut studio album, Voices in My Head, was released in the United Kingdom on 6 May 2013. Despite the successful singles, due to issues with the label, the album was neglected by Dot himself and it only managed to chart at number 146 on the UK Albums Chart. A free mixtape entitled Throwback Music was released soon after, consisting of songs that didn't make the final cut of the album.

=== 2013: Interview and name change ===
After leaving his label deal, Minfection EP was released in January 2014. Ellis then proceeded to put out his self-released album Interview featuring artists including Sickman, Stylo G, Lady Leshurr and Abel Miller.

Taking a break from rapping, Ellis changed his stage name to Zeph Ellis and focused on production, releasing various instrumental projects including the This Side of Grime series. He produced an instrumental titled "XCXD BXMB" which featured on the fabriclive.83 mix CD. It was used as the basis for Kano's "Garage Skank" from Made in the Manor, and AJ Tracey's "Naila" from the Alex Moran EP. Ellis also produced Jammer's 2016 single "Dagenham Dave".

=== Death ===
Ellis died suddenly in The Gambia, on 8 March 2026, at the age of 37.

== Discography ==
=== Studio albums ===
Title	Album details
Voices in My Head	Released: 6 May 2013; Label: Mercury/Universal Records Ltd.
Interview	Released: 13 July 2014; Label: Minarmy; Free download

=== Mixtapes ===
Title	Mixtape details
This Is the Beginning (as Young Dot)	Released: 2007; Label: Self-released
Rotten Riddims, Volume 1 (as Young Dot)	Released: 1 June 2008; Label: GPP Records
Rotten Riddims, Volume 2 (as Young Dot)	Released: 9 June 2008; Label: GPP Records
Rotten Riddims, Volume 3 (as Young Dot)	Released: 16 June 2008; Label: GPP Records
Rotten Riddims, Volume 4 (as Young Dot)	Released: 23 June 2008; Label: GPP Records

Title	Mixtape details
Rotten Riddims, Volume 5 (as Young Dot)	Released: 30 June 2008; Label: GPP Records
Rotten Riddims, Volume 6 (as Young Dot)	Released: 7 July 2008; Label: GPP Records
R.I.P. Young Dot (as Dot Rotten)	Released: 14 July 2008; Label: GPP Records
Something Out of Nothing (S.O.O.N) (as Dot Rotten)	Released: 2 November 2009; Label: Self Released
Extra Attention (as Dot Rotten)	Released: 21 December 2009; Label: Self Released
Throwback Music (as Dot Rotten)	Released: 11 March 2013; Label: Self Released
Rotten Riddims, Volume 7 (as Dot Rotten)	Released: 20 May 2014; Label: Self Released
808s and Gunshots (as Dot Rotten)	Released: 6 January 2020; Label: Self Released

=== Extended plays ===
Title	EP details
Above the Waves	Released: 14 June 2011; Self-released
Minfection	Released: 7 January 2014; Self-released
Remember Me	Released: 5 December 2014; Self-released
Spotified Mine	Released: 21 July 2017; Self-released
No L's	Released: 22 September 2017; Self-released

=== Singles ===
Single	Year	Peak chart positions			Album
Single	Year	UK	UK R&B	SCO	Album
"Keep It on a Low"	2011	70	32	—	Voices in My Head
"Are You Not Entertained?"	2012	53	21	76	Voices in My Head
"Overload" (featuring TMS)	2012	15	3	20	Voices in My Head
"Karmageddon"	2012	67	—	—	Voices in My Head
"—" denotes a title that did not chart, or was not released in that territory.

==== As featured artist ====
Single	Year	Peak chart positions			Album
Single	Year	UK	UK R&B	SCO	Album
"A Star" (Early B featuring Dot Rotten)	2008	—	—	—	Non-album single
"Teardrop" (as part of The Collective)	2011	24	7	30	Non-album single
"—" denotes a title that did not chart, or was not released in that territory.

==== Guest appearances ====
Song	Year	Album
"Sounds & Gimmicks" (P Money featuring Dot Rotten)	2008	P Money Is Power
"Seven Figure Swagger" (Plastician Remix) (Foreign Beggars featuring Wretch 32 & Dot Rotten)	2010	Beggattron Remixed EP 1
"Goodbye to You" (Ed Sheeran featuring Dot Rotten)	2011	No. 5 Collaborations Project
"Speeding By" (Mz. Bratt featuring Dot Rotten)	2011	Elements
"Dub on the Track" (Cher Lloyd featuring Mic Righteous, Dot Rotten + Ghetts)	2011	Sticks + Stones
"You Need Me, I Don't Need You" (True Tiger Remix) (Ed Sheeran featuring Dot Rotten & Scrufizzer)	2011	The Thank You EP
"Single Tear" (S-X Remix) (Tyler James featuring Dot Rotten)	2012	Single Tear — (Remixes)
"Evolution" (Kid Bookie featuring Griminal, Brotherhood, Dot Rotten, Pawz and Maxsta)	2013	N/A
"Evolution 2" (Kid Bookie featuring Samantha Mumba, Crooked I, Kuniva D12, Lady Leshurr, Scrufizzer and Dot Rotten)	2014	That SP Compilation, Vol.1

== Music videos ==
This list is incomplete

Song	Year	Director	References
"Normal Human Being"	2011	Luke Monaghan + James Barber	
"I Want To Annoy"	2011	Quason Matthews + Joseph Ellis	
"Speeding By" (with Mz. Bratt)	2011	Quason Matthews + Joseph Ellis	
"Teardrop" (as part of The Collective)	2011	Ben Vertex + Ben Leinster	
"Keep It on a Low"	2011	Luke Monagan + James Barber	
"Dub on the Track" (with Cher Lloyd, Mic Righteous + Ghetts)	2011	Paris Zarcilla	
"Are You Not Entertained"	2012	Adam Powell	
"Understimated"	2012	Jamal Woon + Joseph Ellis	
"Overload"	2012	Quason Matthews	
"Overload" (Remix)	2012	Saoud Khalaf + Charlotte Regan	

== Awards and nominations ==
Year	Organisation	Award	Result	Ref.
2011	BBC Sound of 2012	Sound of 2012	Nominated	

== Tours ==
- No More Idols Tour (2011) (as supporting act)
- Cole World... World Tour (2011) (as supporting act)
- Dappy Tour (2011) (as supporting act)
