= Lions in the Wild =

Single by Martin Garrix and Third Party

from the album Hope
- Released: 27 May 2016
- Recorded: 2016
- Genre: Progressive house; big room house
- Length: 3:31 (radio edit); 4:22 (original mix)
- Label: Stmpd
- Songwriters: Martijn Garritsen; Harry Bass; Jonnie Macaire; Max McElligott
- Producers: Martin Garrix; Third Party

Martin Garrix singles chronology
"Now That I've Found You" (2016)	"Lions in the Wild" (2016)	"Oops" (2016)

Third Party singles chronology
"Real Sound" (2016)	"Lions in the Wild" (2016)	"Never Let You Go" (2016)

Music video
- "Lions in the Wild" on YouTube

"Lions in the Wild" is a song recorded by Dutch DJ and record producer Martin Garrix and British DJ and production duo Third Party. It features the uncredited vocals of British singer Max McElligott, formerly of the group Wolf Gang. It was released on streaming services after he premiered the song at Ultra Music Festival 2016 on 27 May 2016.

== Background and composition ==
"Lions in the Wild" features "a melodic synth-driven drop and dramatic snare-stuttered builds". This collaboration with British DJs Third Party was premiered by Garrix at the Ultra Music Festival 2016 as his opening song. It is his second single since launching the record label Stmpd Rcrds.

== Music video ==
The music video, which was filmed in Africa and Thailand, was uploaded on Martin Garrix's official YouTube channel. As of 13 October 2016, the video has over 16 million views. The video begins with Giaro Giarratana, the director and producer of the music video, driving by a desert where he stopped to stroll around. He then moves on to climb rocks before riding a desert buggy through the desert. The video concludes with Giaro visiting the local community before riding a dirt bike through rocky mountains.

== Charts ==
=== Weekly charts ===
Chart (2016)	Peak position
France (SNEP)	125
Slovenia (SloTop50)	4

=== Year-end charts ===
Chart (2016)	Position
Slovenia (SloTop50)	34

Chart (2017)	Position
Slovenia (SloTop50)	23
