= TS7 =

- Born: Thomas Sampson; Bradford, United Kingdom
- Genres: UK garage; bassline; house
- Occupations: Producer, DJ, songwriter
- Years active: 2007–present
- Labels: 2-Tone Entertainment, 3Beat Records, CruCast, Universal Records

Thomas Sampson, better known as TS7, is a British DJ, record producer, remixer and songwriter.

== Early life ==
Thomas Sampson was born and raised in Bradford, England. He was introduced to DJing and garage music at an early age and began to play in local nightclubs within the garage and bassline club scene.

From the age of just 5, his parents encouraged him to have piano lessons. He went on to achieve grade 5 by the time he was 13. Producing started at the young age of 14, when he managed to get hold of the software ‘Fruityloops’ (now known as FL Studio).

== Music career ==
In 2007 TS7 signed to Agent X’s UK Garage label, Heatseeker Recordings. His releases on Heatseeker included Smile which provided him with his first breakthrough and led to an official remix of Estelle's number 1 single "American Boy" for Warner Records.

Throughout 2008 TS7 worked on a number of remixes and was featured on the breakthrough, genre-defining bassline compilations Sound of Bassline 1 + 2

In March 2018 TS7 released Real Raver with Slick Don independently, the track has gone on to stream over 25 million plays.

In 2019 TS7’s remix of James Hype’s I Was Lovin U has since reached over 15 million streams.

In 2020 TS7 signed with Fuego Management who also represent NOTION, Holy Goof and Y U QT.

He self-released a series of singles throughout 2021 via Believe which culminated in the release of Slow Down EP in January 2022. The single Slow Down has had 5 million streams and was playlisted at Kiss Dance and Capital Dance. Alongside this he launched his new live show TS7 LIVE and embarked on a headline tour across the UK.

In the summer of 2022 he released a new single Know My Name and played a number of festival dates which included a set on the BBC Radio 1 Dance Stage at Reading And Leeds. He also released a remix of Bru-C’s No Excuses on 0207 Def Jam.

== Discography ==
- TS7 feat. T.Dot - Raise Your Glasses
- TS7 feat. Tonia - Smile
- TS7 feat. Taylor Fowlis (Tayá) - "Heartlight (Polygon)"
- TS7 - Reach
- TS7 - The Receptive EP
- TS7 - Mood Swings
- TS7 - All Night Long
- TS7 - Don’t Play Yourself
- TS7 - Hulk
- TS7 - Judo
- TS7 - Motion Shift (Remixes)
- TS7 - Carbon Flare
- TS7 - I Could Be The One
- TS7 - Lacuna
- TS7 feat. Slick Don - Real Raver
- TS7 - Emotion
- TS7 - Something Else
- TS7 - Skanker
- TS7 - So High/Raptor
- TS7 - All My Love
- TS7 - Slow Down
- TS7 - Know My Name

=== Collaborations ===
- Skepsis & TS7 - Freak
- Holy Goof & TS7 - Over You

=== Remixes ===
- Estelle - "American Boy"
- Tujamo & Plastic Funk - "Dr. Who"
- I Am - “I’m A Miracle”
- IV Rox - “I Heard Love”
- DJ Q - “Trust Again”
- Ashea - “Let You Go”
- SugaRush Beat Company - “L-O-V-E”
- Baby Blue - "Bump"
- Tulisa - “Sight Of You”
- Disciples x Eyelar - “All Mine”
- Fuse ODG - "Antenna"
- Sigma - "Nobody to Love"
- Sigala - “Say You Do”
- Roll Deep - “All Or Nothing”
- James Hype - “I Was Lovin’ You”
- Bru-C - “No Excuses”
