= Voices in My Head (album) =

Studio album by Dot Rotten
- Released: 6 May 2013
- Recorded: 2011–2013
- Genre: Grime; British hip hop
- Length: 45:13
- Label: Mercury; Universal
- Producer: Craze & Hoax; Dot Rotten; Naughty Boy; Steel Banglez; TMS; True Tiger

Dot Rotten chronology
Voices in My Head (2013)	Interview (2014)

Singles from Voices in My Head
- 1. "Keep It on a Low" Released: 14 November 2011; 2. "Are You Not Entertained?" Released: 4 March 2012; 3. "Overload" Released: 3 June 2012; 4. "Karmageddon" Released: 14 December 2012

Voices in My Head is the debut studio album by English rapper Dot Rotten, released through Mercury Records on 6 May 2013. Production was primarily handled by Dot himself and TMS, however Naughty Boy and True Tiger were among contributors. The album also spawned four singles; "Keep It on a Low", "Are You Not Entertained?", "Overload" and "Karmageddon". The album peaked at number 146 on the UK Albums Chart.

== Background ==
In 2011, Dot Rotten was one of many artists selected to feature on the official 2011 Children in Need single, Teardrop, produced by Gary Barlow and Labrinth, which peaked at number 24 on the UK Singles Chart and number 7 on the UK R&B Singles Chart. A day after the single was released, Dot released his own debut single, Keep It on a Low. This hard work led Dot to be nominated for the BBCs Sound of 2012 along with 14 other artists, including A$AP Rocky and Azealia Banks, a poll that is aimed to promote upcoming artists. Despite not winning the poll, Dot was quick to release his next single, Are You Not Entertained? in March. He then released Overload in the summer of 2012, which is his most successful single to date, and Karmageddon in late 2012.

== Singles ==
- Dot Rotten's debut single, "Keep It on a Low", was not commercially successful, although it did receive airplay from BBC Radio 1Xtra and was praised by NME for being "uplifting, grime-derived pop music in hi-def".
- "Are You Not Entertained?" was named Zane Lowe's Hottest Record in the World in January, and released on 4 March 2012. The single was significantly more successful than his previous, peaking at number 53 on the UK Singles Chart and 21 on the UK R&B Singles Chart on 17 March 2012.
- Zane Lowe also named "Overload" as his Hottest Record in the World in March. After significant airplay and live performances, "Overload" was released as an official single on 3 June 2012, debuting and peaking at number 15 on the UK Singles Chart and number 3 on the UK R&B Singles Chart. It remains Rotten's highest charting single, selling over 20,000 digital copies.
- The final single from the album, "Karmageddon", was released on 14 December 2012, and for the third successive time, was named Zane Lowe's Hottest Record in the World. It peaked at number 67 on the UK Singles Chart on 29 December 2012.

== Track listing ==
No.	Title	Writer(s)	Producer(s)	Length
1.	"Hello"	Joseph Ellis-Stephenson; Alexander Gowers; Robert Conlon	True Tiger	4:24
2.	"Voices in My Head"	Ellis-Stephenson; Shahid Kahn	Naughty Boy	4:09
3.	"Keep It on a Low"	Ellis-Stephenson; Thomas Barnes; Peter Kelleher; Benjamin Kohn	TMS	3:22
4.	"Are You Not Entertained?"	Ellis-Stephenson; Barnes; Kelleher; Kohn	TMS	2:54
5.	"Overload" (featuring TMS)	Roberto Concina	TMS	3:06
6.	"Pressure"	Ellis-Stephenson; Meshach Broderick; Barnes; Kelleher; Kohn	TMS	3:21
7.	"I Can See"	Ellis-Stephenson; Cherise Roberts; Barnes; Kelleher; Kohn	Dot Rotten; TMS	3:32
8.	"Karmageddon"	Ellis-Stephenson; Adam Parnell; Barnes; Kelleher; Kohn	TMS	4:48
9.	"Gates of Heaven"	Ellis-Stephenson; Pahuldip Singh	Steel Banglez	3:52
10.	"Free"	Ellis-Stephenson; Barnes; Kelleher; Kohn	TMS	3:51
11.	"Picture"	Ellis-Stephenson; Kahn; Harry Craze; Hugo Chegwin	Naughty Boy; Craze & Hoax	4:04
12.	"Thank You"	Ellis-Stephenson; Barnes; Kelleher; Kohn	TMS	3:50
Total length:				45:13

== Chart performance ==
Chart (2013)	Peak position
UK Albums Chart	146

== Release history ==
Regions	Dates	Format(s)	Label(s)
United Kingdom	6 May 2013	Digital download, CD	Mercury Records, Universal Music Group
