= Coming Home (Sigma and Rita Ora song) =

Single by Sigma and Rita Ora

from the album Life
- Released: 6 November 2015
- Recorded: 2015
- Genre: Drum and bass
- Length: 3:33 (album version); 3:27 (acoustic version)
- Label: 3Beat
- Songwriters: Wayne Hector; Tom Barnes; Ben Kohn; Pete Kelleher
- Producers: Sigma; TMS

Sigma singles chronology
"Redemption" (2015)	"Coming Home" (2015)	"Stay" (2016)

Rita Ora singles chronology
"Body on Me" (2015)	"Coming Home" (2015)	"Your Song" (2017)

Music video
- "Coming Home" on YouTube

"Coming Home" is a song by British drum and bass duo Sigma and British singer Rita Ora. The song was released on 6 November 2015.

== Music video ==
The music video for "Coming Home" was released on 5 November 2015 at a total length of three minutes and twenty seconds. The video features Sigma walking in the forest amongst a group of people while Rita sings in a vacant house. The video ends as Sigma, Ora and others have Christmas dinner together.

== Live performances ==
Sigma and Ora performed the song on The X Factor on 29 November 2015. They also performed on the Top of the Pops which aired on Christmas Day 2015.

== Use in media ==
It was featured in a montage during BBC Sport's coverage of the Abu Dhabi Grand Prix. It was also used during Goal of the Month and Goal of the Season on Match of the Day. The acoustic version was used in the eighth episode of the season two of the American TV series, Supergirl.

== Track listing ==
Digital download
No.	Title	Length
1.	"Coming Home"	3:33
2.	"Coming Home" (acoustic version)	3:27

Digital download – remixes
No.	Title	Length
1.	"Coming Home" (M-22 radio edit)	3:39
2.	"Coming Home" (M-22 remix)	4:59
3.	"Coming Home" (Break remix)	5:42
4.	"Coming Home" (Break remix dub)	4:54
5.	"Coming Home" (Danny Howard dub mix)	6:48

== Weekly charts ==
Chart (2015–16)	Peak position
Australia (ARIA)	97
Belgium (Ultratop 50 Flanders)	13
Czech Republic Airplay (ČNS IFPI)	70
Euro Digital Songs (Billboard)	11
Ireland (IRMA)	54
Mexico Ingles Airplay (Billboard)	45
Scottish Singles Sales (Official Charts)	9
UK Dance (Official Charts)	3
UK Digital Songs (Billboard)	8
UK Singles (Official Charts)	15

== Certifications ==
Region	Certification	Certified units/sales
New Zealand (RMNZ)	Gold	15,000^{‡}
United Kingdom (BPI)	Platinum	600,000^{‡}
^{‡} Sales+streaming figures based on certification alone.

== Release history ==
Region	Date	Format	Label
United Kingdom	6 November 2015	Digital download	3Beat
