= Thandi Phoenix =

Australian musician

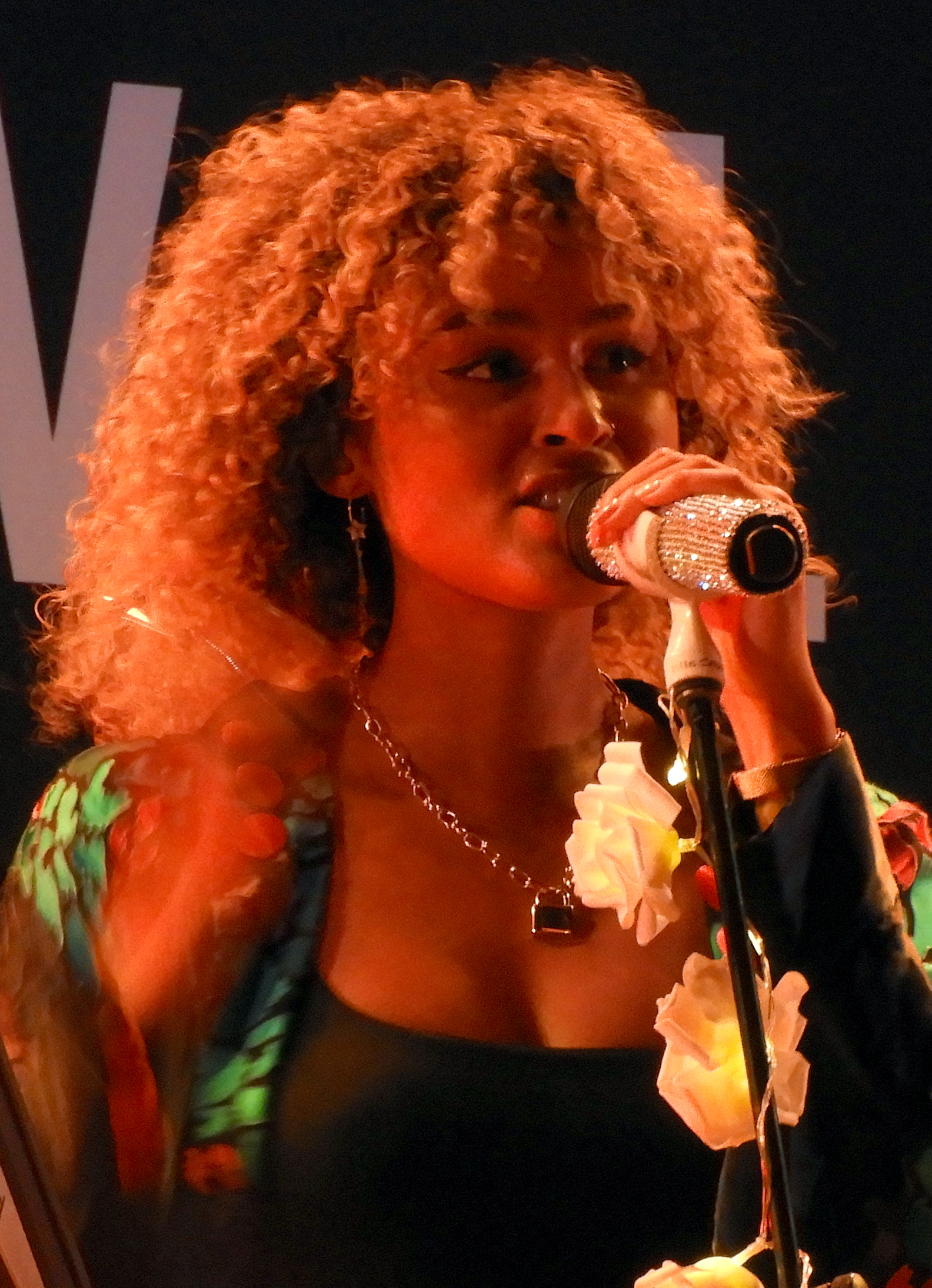
- Thandi Phoenix performs at Womadelaide 2020

Background information
- Born: Thandiwe Phoenix; Sydney, Australia
- Genres: Pop; dance
- Occupations: Musician; singer
- Instruments: Guitar; vocals
- Years active: 2015–present

Thandiwe Phoenix, better known by her stage name Thandi Phoenix, is an Australian musician and singer.

== Career ==
Thandi Phoenix first broke into the mainstream with the hit single "My Way" in 2018. She has had a string of successful releases and collaborations with big names in dance and pop, including Sigma and Rudimental. In 2021, her collaborations with Mell Hall saw the duo take out longest reigning female lead No. 1 on the Australian ARIA Club chart.

Thandi Phoenix has performed at festivals such as Spilt Milk, Splendour in the Grass, and WOMADelaide. She has supported Rudimental, Vera Blue, Jhene Aiko, Tinashe, and Tinie Tempah on their Australian national tours. Thandi performed at the Commonwealth Games Closing Ceremony in April 2018. In March 2019, Thandi performed on Triple J's Like a Version, and in October 2019, she released her self-titled debut EP. She was a guest performer at the 2019 NRL Grand Final, and in 2020, she performed to a live audience of 75,000 people as a guest singer at Fire Fight Australia.

== Discography ==
=== Extended plays (EP) ===
- 2019 "Thandi Phoenix" – Neon Records

=== Singles ===
- 2023 "Hot Sauce" (Produced by Arona Mane) – Thandi Phoenix
- 2022 "Guarantees" Arona Mane – Modablaq Music
- 2022 "Playing With Fire" CARSTN – Up All Night
- 2022 "Lose You" Go Freek, Mickey Kojack – Sweat It Out
- 2021 "Overdrive" – Neon Records
- 2021 "Count Me Out" – Neon Records
- 2019 "Cleopatra" – Neon Records
- 2019 "Say It" Sigma – Neon Records
- 2018 "My Way" Rudimental – Neon Records
- 2017 "Standing Too Close" – Motto Beats
- 2016 "Tell Me Where The Lovers Have Gone" – Motto Beats
- 2015 "Come Around" – Motto Beats

==== As featured artist ====
- 2022 "HOW 2 LEAVE" Tasman Kieth – Tasman Kieth/ AWAL
- 2021 "Knock Knock" – Club Sweat
- 2020 "Freefall" Pat Lok – Kitsuné Musique
- 2020 "Something Good" Sola Rosa – Rosa Inc. Ltd
- 2020 "Shine On" Sola Rosa – Rosa Inc. Ltd
- 2020 "Together" Cassian – Rose Avenue Records
- 2018 "Afterglow" Set Mo – Set Mo Records
- 2018 "Space Odyssey" Just A Gent – Island Records Australia
