= Life (Sigma album) =

Studio album by Sigma
- Released: 4 December 2015
- Recorded: 2013–15
- Length: 47:23
- Label: 3 Beat
- Producer: Sigma; Diztortion; TMS; Hal Ritson; Carl Ryden; Fraser T. Smith; Sigala

Sigma albums chronology
Life (2015)	Hope (2022)

Singles from Life
- 1. "Rudeboy" Released: 15 December 2013; 2. "Nobody to Love" Released: 6 April 2014; 3. "Changing" Released: 14 September 2014; 4. "Higher" Released: 22 March 2015; 5. "Glitterball" Released: 24 July 2015; 6. "Redemption" Released: 2 October 2015; 7. "Coming Home" Released: 6 November 2015; 8. "Stay" Released: 18 March 2016

Life is the debut studio album by English drum and bass duo Sigma. It was released on 4 December 2015, through 3 Beat Records.

== Singles ==
"Rudeboy" featuring Doctor was released as the album's first single on 15 December 2013. It peaked at number 56 on the UK Singles Chart. The song only appears on the deluxe edition of the album. "Nobody to Love" was released as the album's second single on 6 April 2014. It was originally a bootleg remix of "Bound 2" by Kanye West. The song was Sigma's first UK number one and sold over 121,000 copies in the first week. It has also topped the charts in Scotland, Poland and New Zealand. In the latter country, after falling out of the chart after three weeks, it returned to the chart the following week and went straight to number one. The song has also reached the top 3 in Belgium and Ireland, and number 11 in Australia.

"Changing" featuring Paloma Faith was released as the album's third single on 14 September 2014. The song became the duo's second UK number one single. "Higher" featuring Labrinth was released as the fourth single on 22 March 2015 and peaked at number 12 in the UK. "Glitterball" featuring Ella Henderson was released on 24 July 2015 as the fifth single. It reached number four in the UK. "Redemption" was released on 2 October 2015 as the sixth single. The song is a collaboration between Sigma and Diztortion and features vocals by Jacob Banks. "Coming Home" was released as the seventh single on 6 November 2015. It is a collaborative single with Rita Ora. "Stay" was released as the eighth single on 18 March 2016.

== Promotion ==
=== Tour ===
Sigma embarked on a ten-date tour starting on 22 October 2015 and ending on 4 November 2015.

Tour dates
Date	City	Country	Support acts	Venue
22 October 2015	Manchester	United Kingdom	Majestic	Warehouse Project
23 October 2015	Edinburgh	United Kingdom	Karen Harding; Majestic	Liquid Room
24 October 2015	Newcastle	United Kingdom	Karen Harding; Majestic	O2 Academy Newcastle
25 October 2015	Dublin	Ireland	Majestic	The Academy
27 October 2015	Bristol	United Kingdom	Karen Harding; Majestic	O2 Academy Bristol
28 October 2015	Sheffield	United Kingdom	Karen Harding; Majestic	Sheffield Plug
31 October 2015	Portsmouth	United Kingdom	Karen Harding; Majestic	Portsmouth Pyramids
1 November 2015	London	United Kingdom	Karen Harding; Majestic	The Roundhouse
3 November 2015	Oxford	United Kingdom	Karen Harding; Majestic	O2 Academy Oxford
4 November 2015	Norwich	United Kingdom	Karen Harding; Majestic	Waterfront

They then announced another tour:

Date	Country	City	Venue
21 February 2016	Russia	Saint Petersburg	Pirate Station
27 February 2016	United Kingdom	Bristol	SWX
17 March 2016	France	Morzine	Snowboxx Festival
25 March 2016	United Kingdom	Leamington Spa	Leamington Assembly
26 March 2016	United Kingdom	Falkirk	Warehouse
27 March 2016	United Kingdom	Edinburgh	Why Not Nightclub
30 March 2016	United Kingdom	Norwich	Norwich LCR UEA
31 March 2016	United Kingdom	Manchester	O2 Ritz
1 April 2016	United Kingdom	Nottingham	Rock City
2 April 2016	United Kingdom	London	O2 Academy Brixton

== Track listing ==
Life – Standard edition
No.	Title	Writer(s)	Producer(s)	Length
1.	"Redemption" (with Diztortion featuring Jacob Banks)	Joseph "Joe" Lenzie; Cameron "Cam" Edwards; Raoul Chen; Banks	Sigma; Diztortion	3:50
2.	"Changing" (featuring Paloma Faith)	Wayne Hector; Ella McMahon; Tom Barnes; Ben Kohn; Pete Kelleher	Sigma; TMS	3:25
3.	"Running"	Lenzie; Edwards; Hal Ritson; Chlöe Howl	Sigma; Hal Ritson	3:09
4.	"Coming Home" (with Rita Ora)	Hector; Barnes; Kelleher; Kohn	Sigma; TMS	3:32
5.	"Nobody to Love"	Cydel Charles Young; Ernest Dion Wilson; Norman Virgil Whiteside; Kanye Omari West; John Roger Stephens; Che J Pope; Elon Rutberg; Sakiya Sandifer; Ronnie Self; Malik Yusef Jones; Michael Dean; Bobby Dukes; Bobby Massey; Lester Allen McKenzie; Charles K. Wilson	Sigma	4:10
6.	"Broken Promises" (featuring Maverick Sabre)	Lenzie; Edwards; Michael Stafford	Sigma	3:49
7.	"Stay"	Lenzie; Edwards; Carl Ryden; Elizabeth Paige	Sigma; Carl Ryden	4:00
8.	"Glitterball" (featuring Ella Henderson)	Hector; Jim Eliot; Mima Stilwell	Sigma	3:46
9.	"Higher" (featuring Labrinth)	Hector; Barnes; Kelleher; Kohn; Tom Hull	Sigma; TMS	4:03
10.	"Lost Away" (featuring Shakka)	Lenzie; Edwards; Ritson; Shakka Philip	Sigma; Ritson	3:59
11.	"Good Times" (with Ella Eyre)	McMahon; Lenzie; Edwards; Bruce Fielder	Sigma; Sigala; Michael Angelo^{[a]}	3:45
12.	"Feels Like Home" (featuring Ina Wroldsen)	Lenzie; Edwards; Fraser T. Smith; Wroldsen	Sigma; Fraser T. Smith	2:38
13.	"Coming Home" (acoustic version) (with Rita Ora)	Hector; Barnes; Kelleher; Kohn		3:27

Life – Deluxe edition
No.	Title	Writer(s)	Producer(s)	Length
1.	"Redemption" (with Diztortion featuring Jacob Banks)			3:50
2.	"Slow Down" (featuring Jetta)	Lenzie; Edwards; Jetta John Hartley	Sigma	4:47
3.	"Higher" (featuring Labrinth)			4:03
4.	"Life" (featuring Bartoven)	Lenzie; Edwards; Chimezie Emenike	Sigma	2:27
5.	"Nobody to Love"			4:10
6.	"Lost Away" (featuring Shakka)			3:59
7.	"Running"			3:09
8.	"Changing" (featuring Paloma Faith)			3:25
9.	"Lighters" (featuring Majestic)	Lenzie; Edwards; Kevin Christie	Sigma	3:30
10.	"Broken Promises" (featuring Maverick Sabre)			3:49
11.	"Glitterball" (featuring Ella Henderson)			3:46
12.	"Rudeboy" (featuring Doctor)	Lenzie; Edwards; Andre Virgin; Jason Andre McDermott	Sigma	3:50
13.	"Stay"			4:00
14.	"Coming Home" (with Rita Ora)			3:32
15.	"Feel It"	Lenzie; Edwards; Ritson	Sigma; Ritson	4:47
16.	"Beyond the Wall"	Lenzie; Edwards; Ritson	Sigma; Ritson	5:36
17.	"The Reason" (featuring Nicole Jackson)	Lenzie; Edwards; Jackson	Sigma	3:43
18.	"Good Times" (with Ella Eyre)			3:45
19.	"Feels Like Home" (featuring Ina Wroldsen)			2:38
20.	"Coming Home" (acoustic version) (with Rita Ora)			3:27

Notes

- ^{^a} signifies a vocal producer

== Charts ==
Chart (2015)	Peak position
Belgian Albums (Ultratop Flanders)	74
Scottish Albums (Official Charts)	39
UK Albums (Official Charts)	28
UK Dance Albums (Official Charts)	2
UK Album Downloads (Official Charts)	7

== Certifications ==
Region	Certification	Certified units/sales
United Kingdom (BPI)	Gold	100,000^{‡}
^{‡} Sales+streaming figures based on certification alone.
