= Heartlight (Polygon) =

Single by Ts7 featuring Taylor Fowlis
- Released: 17 February 2013
- Genre: House UK Garage
- Length: 3:05
- Label: 2-Tone Entertainment; 3Beat; All Around the World
- Songwriters: Taylor Fowlis; Penny Foster; Paul Aiden
- Producer: Thomas Sampson

Taylor Fowlis singles chronology
"Summer Calling" (2013)	"Heartlight (Polygon)" (2013)

"Heartlight (Polygon)" is a song by British record producer Ts7. It was co-written by Taylor Fowlis, Penny Foster & Paul Aiden and features English recording artist Taylor Fowlis. The song was released in the United Kingdom on 7 February 2013.

== Critical reception ==
The track was well received with many excited by its tech house and garage influences. Critics also noted "Taylor’s voice is perfectly sweet, barely-processed so that it evokes the emotion". The track was also listed as on the music industry tip page "Record Of The Day".

== Music video ==
The official music video was uploaded to YouTube on 17 February 2013. It was shot in Shoredich, London and introduced young singer/songwriter Taylor Fowlis The video was popular across music television with it reaching number 1 on the MTV Base Charts in the UK.
