= Find Me (Sigma song) =

Single by Sigma featuring Birdy

from the album Hope
- Released: 4 November 2016
- Recorded: 2016
- Genre: Pop; breakbeat
- Length: 3:24
- Label: 3Beat
- Songwriters: Peter Barnes; Camille Purcell; Peter Kelleher; Ben Kohn; Joe Lenzie; Cameron Edwards; Jasmine van den Bogaerde
- Producers: Sigma; TMS; Cameron Edwards; Joe Lenzie

Sigma singles chronology
"Cry" (2016)	"Find Me" (2016)	"Forever" (2017)

Birdy singles chronology
"Words" (2016)	"Find Me" (2016)	"Hear You Calling" (2016)

Music video
- "Find Me" on YouTube

"Find Me" is a song by British electronic music duo Sigma. It features vocals from English singer Birdy. It was released on 4 November 2016, through 3 Beat Records as the lead single from the duo's 2022 second studio album, Hope. The song peaked at number 36 on the UK Singles Chart and number one on the Billboard Dance Club Songs chart in its 20 May 2017 issue.

== Music video ==
The official music video, directed by Christopher Sims, was uploaded to YouTube on 3 November 2016. The video features British actress Millie Bobby Brown as a young woman on an emotional journey through Los Angeles late at night.

== Track listing ==
Digital download
No.	Title	Length
1.	"Find Me" (radio edit) (featuring Birdy)	3:24

Digital download – EP
No.	Title	Length
1.	"Find Me" (acoustic)	3:07
2.	"Find Me" (Sigma VIP remix)	4:12
3.	"Find Me" (Zac Samuel edit)	4:02
4.	"Find Me" (Tom Zanetti & K.O. Kane remix)	5:05
5.	"Find Me" (LAAW remix)	2:51

== Chart performance ==
=== Weekly charts ===
Chart (2016–17)	Peak position
Belgium (Ultratip Bubbling Under Flanders)	4
Belgium Dance (Ultratop Flanders)	12
Belgium (Ultratip Bubbling Under Wallonia)	3
Belgium Dance (Ultratop Wallonia)	15
Czech Republic Airplay (ČNS IFPI)	30
France (SNEP)	193
Ireland (IRMA)	45
Mexico (Billboard Ingles Airplay)	8
Scottish Singles Sales (Official Charts)	21
Slovakia Airplay (ČNS IFPI)	68
UK Singles (Official Charts)	36
UK Dance (Official Charts)	9
US Dance Club Songs (Billboard)	1
US Hot Dance/Electronic Songs (Billboard)	29
US Rock & Alternative Airplay (Billboard)	45

=== Year-end charts ===
Chart (2017)	Position
US Dance Club Songs (Billboard)	11
US Hot Dance/Electronic Songs (Billboard)	96

== Certifications ==
Region	Certification	Certified units/sales
New Zealand (RMNZ)	Gold	15,000^{‡}
United Kingdom (BPI)	Gold	400,000^{‡}
^{‡} Sales+streaming figures based on certification alone.

== See also ==
- List of number-one dance singles of 2017 (U.S.)
