= Anywhere (Sigma song) =

Single by Sigma

from the album Hope
- Released: 15 June 2018
- Recorded: 2017
- Length: 3:25
- Label: 3Beat
- Songwriters: Cameron Edwards; Danny Shah; Joseph Lenzie; Sky Adams; Louis Du Sauzay
- Producer: Joseph Lenzie

Sigma singles chronology
"Forever" (2017)	"Anywhere" (2018)	"Say It" (2019)

Music video
- "Anywhere" on YouTube

"Anywhere" is a song by English drum and bass duo Sigma. It was released on 15 June 2018 by 3 Beat Records as the second single from the duo's second studio album, Hope. The song peaked at number 90 on the UK Singles Chart. The song was written by Cameron Edwards, Danny Shah, Joseph Lenzie, Sky Adams and Louis Du Sauzay.

== Music video ==
A music video to accompany the release of "Anywhere" was first released onto YouTube on 31 August 2018 at a total length of three minutes.

== Charts ==
Chart (2018)	Peak position
UK Singles (Official Charts)	90

== Certifications ==
Region	Certification	Certified units/sales
United Kingdom (BPI)	Silver	200,000^{‡}
^{‡} Sales+streaming figures based on certification alone.
