= Redemption (Sigma and Diztortion song) =

Single by Sigma and Diztortion featuring Jacob Banks

from the album Life
- Released: 2 October 2015
- Recorded: 2015
- Genre: Drum and bass; breakbeat
- Length: 3:48
- Label: 3Beat; All Around the World
- Producers: Cameron Edwards; Joe Lenzie

Sigma singles chronology
"Glitterball" (2015)	"Redemption" (2015)	"Coming Home" (2015)

Diztortion singles chronology
"Fester Skank" (2015)	"Redemption" (2015)

Jacob Banks singles chronology
"Move with You" (2014)	"Redemption" (2015)	"What Do You Love" (2016)

Music video
- "Redemption" on YouTube

"Redemption" is a 2015 single by Sigma and Diztortion. It features the vocals from Jacob Banks. It was announced as Radio 1's Track of the Day on 2 October 2015. A music video was produced for the song which features Banks on vocals.

== Track listing ==
Digital download – single
No.	Title	Length
1.	"Redemption" (with Diztortion featuring Jacob Banks)	3:48

Digital download – EP
No.	Title	Length
1.	"Redemption" (featuring Jacob Banks) (Sigma VIP mix)	3:08
2.	"Redemption" (featuring Jacob Banks and Lethal Bizzle) (Diztortion refix)	3:52
3.	"Redemption" (featuring Jacob Banks) (Digital Farm Animals remix)	3:48
4.	"Redemption" (featuring Jacob Banks) (Jack Beats dub)	4:39
5.	"Redemption" (featuring Jacob Banks) (Goldsmyth edition)	3:23

Digital download – M. J. Cole remixes
No.	Title	Length
1.	"Redemption" (featuring Jacob Banks) (M. J. Cole radio edit)	3:00
2.	"Redemption" (featuring Jacob Banks) (M. J. Cole remix)	5:41

== Charts ==
Chart (2015)	Peak position
Belgium (Ultratop 50 Flanders)	35
UK Singles (Official Charts Company)	138
