= Higher (Sigma song) =

Single by Sigma featuring Labrinth

from the album Life
- Released: 22 March 2015
- Recorded: 2015
- Genre: Drum and bass
- Length: 3:05 (single version); 4:03 (album version)
- Label: 3Beat; All Around the World
- Songwriters: Peter Kelleher; Ben Kohn; Tom Barnes; Tom Hull; Wayne Hector
- Producers: Cameron Edwards; Joe Lenzie; TMS

Sigma singles chronology
"Changing" (2014)	"Higher" (2015)	"Glitterball" (2015)

Labrinth singles chronology
"Jealous" (2014)	"Higher" (2015)	"Make Me (Cry)" (2016)

Music video
- "Higher" on YouTube

"Higher" is the fourth single by English drum and bass duo Sigma from their debut studio album Life (2015). It was written by TMS, Tom Hull and Wayne Hector. It features the vocals from English singer Labrinth. The song was released as a digital download in the United Kingdom on 22 March 2015. The song peaked at number 12 on the UK Singles Chart.

== Music video ==
A music video to accompany the release of "Higher" was first released onto YouTube on 13 February 2015 at a total length of three minutes and five seconds (03:05).

== Track listing ==
- Digital download
1. "Higher" (featuring Labrinth) – 3:01
- Digital download – remix bundle
1. "Higher" (Sigma VIP remix) – 3:52
2. "Higher" (GRADES remix) – 6:52
3. "Higher" (Grant Nelson remix) – 6:05
4. "Higher" (Kideko remix) – 4:58
5. "Higher" (Jay Montero club mix) – 4:17
6. "Higher" (Lucas Maverick remix) – 4:46

== Charts ==
Chart (2015)	Peak position
Belgium (Ultratip Bubbling Under Flanders)	40
Scottish Singles Sales (Official Charts)	6
UK Dance (Official Charts)	1
UK Singles (Official Charts)	12

== Certifications ==
Region	Certification	Certified units/sales
United Kingdom (BPI)	Silver	200,000^{‡}
^{‡} Sales+streaming figures based on certification alone.

== Release history ==
Region	Date	Format	Label
United Kingdom	22 March 2015	Digital download	3Beat; All Around the World

== In popular culture ==
The song was used as an online trailer for the BBC One drama Casualty. The song was also used in the introduction of the Sky Sports Super Sunday, used during the 2015–16 and 2016–17 seasons.

"Higher" was featured in the Madden NFL 16 soundtrack. The song was also used when the players walked onto the court during the 2015 Barclays ATP World Tour Finals.

Swisse Australia also promoted this song in preparation for the 2016 Summer Olympics. It was later featured in the end credits of the film Collide.
