= Changing (Sigma song) =

2014 single by Sigma

Single by Sigma featuring Paloma Faith

from the album Life
- Released: 14 September 2014
- Recorded: 2014
- Genre: Drum and bass
- Length: 3:11
- Label: 3Beat; All Around the World
- Songwriters: Peter Kelleher; Ben Kohn; Tom Barnes; Wayne Hector; Ella Eyre
- Producers: Cameron Edwards; Joe Lenzie; TMS

Sigma singles chronology
"Nobody to Love" (2014)	"Changing" (2014)	"Higher" (2015)

Paloma Faith singles chronology
"Trouble with My Baby" (2014)	"Changing" (2014)	"Ready for the Good Life" (2014)

Music video
- "Changing" on YouTube

"Changing" is a song by British record production duo Sigma. It was co-written by TMS, Wayne Hector and Ella Eyre. The song features English singer Paloma Faith, most associated with her pop and soul ballads. This song was heard on Vodafone commercials in October 2017 for the brand-new "Proud" campaign.

"Changing" was released as the third single from their debut studio album Life (2015) on 14 September 2014, reaching number one for one week, becoming Faith's first UK number-one single and Sigma's second. An alternate version of the song appears on Faith's album A Perfect Contradiction: Outsiders' Edition.

== Music video ==
The official music video, directed by Craig Moore, was uploaded to YouTube on 17 July 2014. It was shot in Miami. Both Sigma and Faith feature in the video. As of 18 June 2025, it has accumulated over 68 million views.

== Track listing ==
- Digital download
1. "Changing" (featuring Paloma Faith) – 3:11
- Digital download – remixes
1. "Changing" (Sigma's VIP remix) (featuring Stylo G) – 3:28
2. "Changing" (Klingande remix) – 5:59
3. "Changing" (Purple Disco Machine remix) – 5:11
4. "Changing" (Majestic remix) – 4:49
5. "Changing" (Naxxos remix) – 4:44
6. "Changing" (Zoo Station club edit) – 5:44

== Charts ==
=== Weekly charts ===
Chart (2014–2015)	Peak position
Australia (ARIA)	19
Austria (Ö3 Austria Top 40)	32
Belgium (Ultratop 50 Flanders)	4
Belgium Dance (Ultratop Flanders)	1
Belgium (Ultratip Bubbling Under Flanders)	1
Belgium Dance Bubbling Under (Ultratop Flanders)	1
Belgium (Ultratop 50 Wallonia)	34
Belgium Dance (Ultratop Wallonia)	6
Belgium (Ultratip Bubbling Under Wallonia)	34
Czech Republic Airplay (ČNS IFPI)	5
Czech Republic Singles Digital (ČNS IFPI)	97
Denmark (Tracklisten)	33
Germany (GfK)	87
Ireland (IRMA)	8
Netherlands (Dutch Top 40)	27
Netherlands (Single Top 100)	54
New Zealand (Recorded Music NZ)	9
Poland Airplay (ZPAV)	11
Poland Dance (ZPAV)	22
Russia Airplay (TopHit)	18
Scottish Singles Sales (Official Charts)	1
Slovakia Airplay (ČNS IFPI)	31
Slovakia Singles Digital (ČNS IFPI)	87
Slovenia (SloTop50)	37
UK Singles (Official Charts)	1
UK Dance (Official Charts)	1
Ukraine Airplay (TopHit)	89

=== Year-end charts ===
Chart (2014)	Position
Australia Dance (ARIA)	36
Belgium (Ultratop 50 Flanders)	91
Belgium Dance (Ultratop Wallonia)	78
Netherlands Dance (MegaCharts)	45
Russia Airplay (TopHit)	70
UK Singles (OCC)	34

== Certifications ==
Region	Certification	Certified units/sales
Australia (ARIA)	Gold	35,000^{^}
New Zealand (RMNZ)	Platinum	30,000^{‡}
United Kingdom (BPI)	2× Platinum	1,200,000^{‡}
^{^} Shipments figures based on certification alone.^{‡} Sales+streaming figures based on certification alone.
