= Glitterball (song) =

2015 single by Sigma

Single by Sigma featuring Ella Henderson

from the album Life
- Released: 24 July 2015
- Recorded: 2015
- Genre: Drum and bass; breakbeat
- Length: 3:46
- Label: 3Beat; All Around the World
- Songwriters: Wayne Hector; Jim Eliot; Mima Stilwell
- Producers: Cameron Edwards; Joe Lenzie

Sigma singles chronology
"Higher" (2015)	"Glitterball" (2015)	"Redemption" (2015)

Ella Henderson singles chronology
"Mirror Man" (2015)	"Glitterball" (2015)	"Here for You" (2015)

Music video
- "Glitterball" on YouTube

"Glitterball" is a song by English drum and bass duo Sigma featuring English singer and songwriter Ella Henderson. The song was released as a digital download in the United Kingdom on 24 July 2015 and is the fifth single from their debut studio album Life (2015). The single peaked at number four on the UK Singles Chart. It was at number 78 on the year-end chart in the UK for 2015.

== Music video ==
The music video for Glitterball was filmed on location in Ibiza. It features Henderson and both members of Sigma.

== Track listing ==
- Digital download
1. "Glitterball" (featuring Ella Henderson) – 3:46
- Digital download – remixes
1. "Glitterball" (S.P.Y remix) – 3:59
2. "Glitterball" (S.P.Y's Not So Glittery remix) – 3:44
3. "Glitterball" (99 Souls radio edit) – 2:56
4. "Glitterball" (99 Souls club mix) – 4:42
5. "Glitterball" (GoldSmyth edition) – 3:18
6. "Glitterball" (Hollaphonics radio edit) – 3:36
7. "Glitterball" (Lucas Maverick Disco Rack radio edit) – 3:44
8. "Glitterball" (D'Silva VIP mix) – 4:39

== Critical reception ==
4Music described it as a "euphoric ... hands-in-the-air anthem".

== Charts and certifications ==
=== Weekly charts ===
Chart (2015)	Peak position
Austria (Ö3 Austria Top 40)	66
Belgium (Ultratop 50 Flanders)	34
Czech Republic Airplay (ČNS IFPI)	59
Germany (GfK)	64
Ireland (IRMA)	20
Scottish Singles Sales (Official Charts)	1
Slovakia Airplay (ČNS IFPI)	65
Slovenia (SloTop50)	37
UK Singles (Official Charts)	4
UK Dance (Official Charts)	2
UK Singles Downloads (Official Charts)	1

=== Year-end charts ===
Chart (2015)	Position
UK Singles (OCC)	78

=== Certifications ===
Region	Certification	Certified units/sales
United Kingdom (BPI)	Platinum	600,000^{‡}
^{‡} Sales+streaming figures based on certification alone.

== Release history ==
Region	Date	Format	Label
Ireland	24 July 2015	Digital download	3Beat; All Around the World
United Kingdom	24 July 2015	Digital download	3Beat; All Around the World
