= TMS (production team) =

English songwriting and record production team

- Also known as: TMSLDN; Ghosted; The Breakfastaz
- Origin: Ealing, London, England
- Genres: Pop; electronic; hip hop
- Occupations: Songwriters; record producers
- Years active: 2002–present
- Members: Benjamin Kohn; Pete "Merf" Kelleher
- Past members: Tom 'Froe' Barnes

TMS are an English songwriting and record production team composed of Benjamin Kohn and Pete "Merf" Kelleher. The duo have co-written records for a host of artists including Lewis Capaldi, Dua Lipa, Maroon 5, John Legend, David Guetta, Alicia Keys, and Raye. They have collectively had twenty top 10 singles, sold over 15 million records, accumulated over 5 billion streams and have contributed to over fifty top 40 albums. They co-wrote and produced Lewis Capaldi's "Someone You Loved" which spent seven consecutive weeks at number one and was the best selling single of 2019 in the UK. The song was nominated for Song of the Year at the 63rd annual Grammy Awards and won Song of the Year at the 2020 Brit Awards.

== Early life ==
The members of TMS were all brought up in West London and met while at school. They began playing in local bands before building a studio in a garden shed. After a long gestation period that included releasing records under the name "The Breakfastaz", they broke through in 2011 with two UK #1 records in the space of two months. Tom 'Froe' Barnes was a member until early 2025.

== Career ==
Career highlights include one US No.1 single and seven UK No.1 singles for Lewis Capaldi ("Someone You Loved", "Before You Go"), Jess Glynne ("Don't Be So Hard on Yourself"), Sigma ft. Paloma Faith ("Changing"), Little Mix ("Wings"), Professor Green ft. Emeli Sandé ("Read All About It") and Dappy ("No Regrets").

For the UK Olympics in 2012, TMS had the honour of having their song "Read All About It" performed by Emeli Sandé open the Closing Ceremony, also known as "A Symphony Of British Music." The song featured prominently, being performed twice in front of a backdrop of a stadium covered in newspaper. Watched by a worldwide audience of 750 million people.

In 2019 Capaldi's "Someone You Loved" spent 3 weeks at #1 in the US Billboard Hot 100 while also topping the US AC, Hot AC & Top 40 Radio charts. It spent over 6 months in the European Airplay Top 40 Chart. It was named the biggest single of 2019 by the Official UK Charts Company, spending 7 consecutive weeks at #1 in the Official UK Singles Chart and 43 weeks in the UK Radio Airplay Top 40 Chart. It has amassed over 3.1 billion plays on Spotify alone, currently making it the fourth highest streaming single in Spotify's history.

== Songwriting and production discography ==
Title	Year	Artist	Album	Songwriter	Producer
"Ricochet"	2026	Ashley Singh		check	check
"Jennifer 珍妮佛"	2026	Charlie Jeer & ØZI	Dance Away Your Problems	check	
''breaks open''	2026	Dove Cameron	FINAL GIRL	check	check
''hands of man''	2026	Dove Cameron	FINAL GIRL	check	check
''emerald''	2026	Dove Cameron	FINAL GIRL	check	check
"ここまで来た (Kokomade Kita)"	2026	Yuki Chiba	EN (◯)	check	check
"Jennifer"	2026	Charlie Jeer	Take Away My Problems	check	
"Small Talk"	2026	Charlie Jeer & Cat Burns	Take Away My Problems	check	
"Mercy"	2026	Tones & I		check	
"Every Man"	2026	Ashley Singh		check	check
''Dog Eat Dog''	2026	Benjamin Steer		check	check
"I Don’t Need Anything"	2026	Bebe Rexha	Dirty Blonde (Physical)	check	
"Battleship"	2026	Freya Ridings	Mother of Pearl	check	
"My Madonna"	2026	Charlie Jeer	Take Away My Problems	check	
''Second Nature''	2026	Gorgon City ft. TAET		check	check
"True Love"	2026	Loreen	Wildfire	check	check
''Feel Alive''	2026	Illenium	Odyssey	check	check
''Love Hurt''	2026	Anyma	The End of Genesys (Deluxe)	check	
''Use Me''	2025	Jade	That's Showbiz Baby! The Encore	check	check
“Wicker Woman”	2025	Freya Ridings	Mother of Pearl	check	
"Good Things Go"	2025	Alexander Stewart	What If?	check	check
"Gone, Gone, Gone"	2025	David Guetta, Teddy Swims, Tones & I		check	
''DIRTY DOG''	2025	David Kushner		check	check
''Not Getting Better''	2025	Ashley Singh		check	check
''Don't Go Home''	2025	Ashley Singh		check	check
''Water''	2025	James Arthur	PISCES	check	check
''Don't Forget You Love Me''	2025	Calum Hood		check	check
Good Grief	2025	Jenna Raine	Only Started Growing	check	check
"Dreams"	2025	Ari Abdul		check	check
''chemical fashion''	2025	Charlotte Plank		check	check
''What It Means''	2024	Elijah Woods		check	check
''Good As Gone''	2024	Kylie Minogue	Tension II	check	check
''Flesh x Blood''	2024	David Kushner	The Dichotomy	check	check
''Roses''	2024	Jenna Raine		check	check
''Sweet Oblivion''	2024	David Kushner	The Dichotomy	check	check
''2 Thousand 10''	2024	Elijah Woods		check	check
''Before I Knew You''	2024	Ben Platt	Honeymind	check	
"Forever"	2024	Loreen		check	
''Hello Love''	2024	Benson Boone	Fireworks & Rollerblades	check	check
''A Cure For Minds Unwell''	2024	Lewis Capaldi	Broken By Desire To Be Heavenly Sent (Extended Edition)	check	check
''Someone I Could Die For''	2024	Lewis Capaldi	Broken By Desire To Be Heavenly Sent (Extended Edition)	check	check
''The Ancient Art Of Always Fucking Up''	2024	Lewis Capaldi	Broken By Desire To Be Heavenly Sent (Extended Edition)	check	check
"Lifeline"	2023	Alicia Keys	The Color Purple: Music from the Motion Picture	check	check
"Amigos (With Becky G)"	2023	BIBI & Becky G		check	check
"Back Home For Christmas"	2023	Mimi Webb		check	
"The Harder It Breaks"	2023	TALK	Lord of the Flies & Birds & Bees	check	check
"ana"	2023	Venbee	Zero Experience	check	check
"Weird!"	2023	Leah Kate	Super Over	check	check
"Desperate"	2023	Leah Kate	Super Over	check	check
"Written By A Woman"	2023	Mae Muller	Sorry I'm Late	check	check
"Home is Where the Hurt Is"	2023	LANY	a beautiful blur	check	
"September"	2023	Katie Gregson-MacLeod	Big Red	check	check
"Your Ex"	2023	Katie Gregson-MacLeod	Big Red	check	check
''I Wish You Cheated''	2023	Alexander Stewart		check	check
"Crown Your Love"	2023	Tom Greenan	What Ifs & Maybe	check	
"Must Be Love"	2023	Niall Horan	The Show	check	check
"Visions (Don't Go)"	2023	Bebe Rexha	Bebe	check	check
"Duvet Cover"	2023	Ashley Singh	Waiting For The Blue	check	check
"Sweet Affection"	2023	Ashley Singh	Waiting For The Blue	check	check
"Never Be Mine"	2023	Rosa Linn		check	check
"Wish You The Best"	2023	Lewis Capaldi	Broken by Desire to Be Heavenly Sent		check
"Any Kind Of Life"	2023	Lewis Capaldi	Broken by Desire to Be Heavenly Sent	check	check
"Love The Hell Out Of You"	2023	Lewis Capaldi	Broken by Desire to Be Heavenly Sent	check	check
"How I'm Feeling Now"	2023	Lewis Capaldi	Broken by Desire to Be Heavenly Sent	check	check
"Must Be Nice"	2022	Ruel	4th Wall	check	check
"Deep Blue Doubt"	2022	Sam Ryder	There's Nothing but Space, Man!	check	check
"Gone Girl"	2022	Olivia O'Brien	A Means To An End	check	check
"Forget Me"	2022	Lewis Capaldi	Broken by Desire to be Heavenly Sent	check	check
"Blood Runs Red"	2022	Matt Maeson		check	
"Moment"	2022	Jaded & Camden Cox	Moment	check	check
"Looking At Me"	2021	JLS	2.0	check	check
"Never Let You Go"	2021	James Arthur	It'll All Make Sense in the End	check	check
"Halfway"	2021	Mimi Webb	Seven Shades of Heartbreak	check	check
"Little Bit Louder"	2021	Mimi Webb	Seven Shades of Heartbreak	check	check
"Don't Break the Heart"	2021	Tom Grennan	Evering Road (Special Edition)	check	check
"Falling Up"	2021	Dean Lewis	Non-album single	check	check
"Should Have Known Better"	2021	Jessie James Decker	Non-album single	check	check
"Holy Water"	2021	JP Cooper	Holy Water	check	
"Therapy"	2021	Anne-Marie	Therapy	check	check
"Sweet Temptation"	2021	Gorgon City	Olympia	check	check
"Happy For You"	2021	Lukas Graham	Happy For You	check	check
"Our Song"	2021	Anne-Marie & Niall Horan	Therapy	check	check
"Bedroom" feat. Anne-Marie	2021	JJ Lin	Like You Do	check	check
"Let's Go Home Together"	2021	Ella Henderson & Tom Grennan	Evering Road	check	check
"Break My Heart"	2021	JC Stewart	Non-album single	check	check
"Weaponry" with Jessie J	2020	Mike Posner	Operation: Wake Up	check	check
"All Dressed Up"	2020	Raye	Euphoric Sad Songs	check	check
"Confetti"	2020	Little Mix	Confetti	check	check
"Happiness"	2020	Little Mix	Confetti	check	check
"Naughty List" feat Dixie D'Amelio	2020	Liam Payne	Non-album single	check	check
"Kill Me Slow"	2020	David Guetta & Morten	New Rave	check	
"Alien"	2020	Dennis Lloyd	Non-album single	check	
"Wild" ft. Gary Clark Jr	2020	John Legend	Bigger Love	check	check
"Cool"	2020	Dua Lipa	Future Nostalgia	check	check
"Time After Time" ft. Jessie Ware	2019	Franky Wah	Non-album single	check	check
"Before You Go"	2019	Lewis Capaldi	Divinely Uninspired to a Hellish Extent (Extended Edition)	check	check
"Marine Parade 2013"	2019	James Arthur	You	check	check
"Heartbeats"	2019	Tom Walker	What A Time To Be Alive	check	check
"Halfway"	2019	James Blunt	Once Upon A Mind	check	check
"5 Miles"	2019	James Blunt	Once Upon A Mind	check	check
"Youngster"	2019	James Blunt	Once Upon A Mind	check	check
"If I Left The World" feat. MARINA & Model Child	2019	Gryffin	Gravity	check	check
"Doing To Me"	2019	Astrid S	Trust Issues	check	check
"Work"	2019	Izzy Bizu	Non-album single	check	check
"Blow My Mind"	2019	Sabina Ddumba	Non-album single	check	check
"Hold Me While You Wait"	2019	Lewis Capaldi	Divinely Uninspired to a Hellish Extent	check	check
"Hindsight"	2019	Matrix & Futurebound	Mystery Machine	check	check
"Stopped Believing in Santa"	2018	MNEK	Non-album single	check	check
"So Long"	2018	Niall Horan	Flicker: Featuring the RTÉ Concert Orchestra	check	check
"The Cure"	2018	Little Mix	LM5	check	check
"Footsteps"	2018	Olly Murs	You Know I Know	check	check
"Go Hard"	2018	Olly Murs	You Know I Know	check	check
"A Lover and a Memory" feat. Mike Posner	2018	Steve Aoki	Neon Future III	check	
"Someone You Loved"	2018	Lewis Capaldi	Divinely Uninspired to a Hellish Extent	check	check
"Photographs" with Rag'n'Bone Man	2018	Professor Green			check
"No One Compares to You"	2018	Jack & Jack	A Good Friend Is Nice	check	check
"One In A Million"	2018	Matoma	One In A Million	check	check
"You Deserve Better"	2018	James Arthur	Non-album single	check	check
"Emotional" feat. Stefflon Don & Chip	2018	Kamille	Non-album single	check	check
"Emotional" feat. Kranium & Louis Rei (WSTRN)	2018	Kamille	Non-album single	check	check
"Can I Get Your Number"	2018	Anne-Marie	Speak Your Mind	check	check
"Your Ex"	2018	Paloma Faith	The Architect: Zeitgeist Edition	check	check
"Make Your Own Kind of Music"	2018	Paloma Faith	The Architect: Zeitgeist Edition	check	
"If I Get My Way"	2017	Little Mix	Glory Days: Platinum Edition	check	check
"Til I'm Done"	2017	Paloma Faith	The Architect	check	check
"Guilty"	2017	Paloma Faith	The Architect	check	check
"I'll Be Gentle" with John Legend	2017	Paloma Faith	The Architect	check	
"Denim Jacket"	2017	Maroon 5	Red Pill Blues	check	check
"On My Own"	2017	Niall Horan	Flicker	check	check
"One Chance To Dance" feat. Joe Jonas	2017	Naughty Boy	Non-album single		check
"Play It Cool" feat. Kyla	2017	Zac Samuel	Non-album single	check	check
"Don't Think About It"	2017	Justine Skye	Ultraviolet	check	check
"How Would You Like It?"	2017	Lauren Aquilina	Isn't It Strange?	check	
"Bad Together"	2017	Dua Lipa	Dua Lipa	check	check
"You Make Me Whole"	2017	Steps	Tears On The Dancefloor	check	
"Best Behaviour"	2017	Louisa Johnson	Non-album single	check	check
"Love Goes On" with Aloe Blacc	2017	Kelly Clarkson	The Shack OST	check	check
"Naturally"	2016	Emeli Sandé	Long Live the Angels	check	check
"Highs & Lows"	2016	Emeli Sandé	Long Live the Angels	check	check
"Private"	2016	Olly Murs	24 Hrs	check	check
"Find Me" feat. Birdy	2016	Sigma	Non-album single	check	check
"Better With You"	2016	Craig David	Following My Intuition	check	check
"Change My Love"	2016	Craig David	Following My Intuition	check	check
"Body Language"	2016	Carly Rae Jepsen	Emotion: Side B	check	check
"New Girl"	2016	Reggie 'n' Bollie	Uncommon Favours	check	
"Give Up"	2016	Birdy	Beautiful Lies	check	check
"Wild Horses"	2016	Birdy	Beautiful Lies		check
"Gold Watch"	2015	Fleur East	Love, Sax and Flashbacks	check	check
"Temporary Fix"	2015	One Direction	Made in the A.M.	check	check
"Clued Up"	2015	Little Mix	Get Weird	check	check
"I Won't"	2015	Little Mix	Get Weird	check	check
"I Love You"	2015	Little Mix	Get Weird	check	check
"Coming Home" with Rita Ora	2015	Sigma	Life	check	check
"Me, Myself & I" with Bebe Rexha	2015	G-Eazy	When It's Dark Out	check	check
"Another Love Song"	2015	Leona Lewis	I Am	check	check
"Forgiven"	2015	Kwabs	Love + War	check	check
"Don't Be So Hard On Yourself"	2015	Jess Glynne	I Cry When I Laugh	check	check
"Worship"	2015	Years & Years	Communion	check	check
"She Ain't Me"	2015	Sinead Harnett	Non-album single	check	check
"Higher" feat. Labrinth	2015	Sigma	Life	check	check
"Who Do I Love You"	2014	Olly Murs	Never Been Better	check	check
"Never Been Better"	2014	Olly Murs	Never Been Better	check	check
"Nothing Without You"	2014	Olly Murs	Never Been Better	check	check
"Five Tattoos"	2014	Ella Henderson	Chapter One		check
"Lay Down"	2014	Ella Henderson	Chapter One	check	check
"Rockets"	2014	Ella Henderson	Chapter One		check
"Pieces"	2014	Ella Henderson	Chapter One	check	check
"Empire"	2014	Ella Henderson	Chapter One	check	check
"Walk"	2014	Kwabs	Love + War		check
"Can't Dance Without You" feat. Whinnie Williams	2014	Professor Green	Growing Up In Public	check	check
"Changing"	2014	Sigma	Life	check	check
"Last Night"	2014	The Vamps	Meet The Vamps	check	check
"Word Up!"	2014	Little Mix	Word Up! EP		check
"My Best"	2013	Rebecca Ferguson	Freedom	check	check
"Personal"	2013	Olly Murs	Right Place Right Time: Special Edition	check	check
"A Different Beat"	2013	Little Mix	Salute	check	check
"Good Enough"	2013	Little Mix	Salute	check	check
"About The Boy"	2013	Little Mix	Salute	check	check
"Competition"	2013	Little Mix	Salute	check	check
"Little Me"	2013	Little Mix	Salute	check	check
"Salute"	2013	Little Mix	Salute	check	check
"Recovery"	2013	James Arthur	James Arthur		check
"You're Nobody 'til Somebody Loves You"	2013	James Arthur	James Arthur	check	check
"Square One"	2013	Jessie J	Alive	check	check
"Favourite Scars"	2013	Cher	Closer To The Truth	check	check
"Melodies"	2013	Madison Beer	Non-album single	check	check
"Thank You"	2013	Dot Rotten	Voices In My Head	check	check
"Free"	2013	Dot Rotten	Voices In My Head	check	check
"I Can See"	2013	Dot Rotten	Voices In My Head	check	check
"Pressure"	2013	Dot Rotten	Voices In My Head	check	check
"Rewind" feat. Diane Birch	2013	Devlin	A Moving Picture	check	check
"Karmageddon"	2012	Dot Rotten	Voices In My Head	check	check
"Make You Believe"	2012	Little Mix	DNA	check	check
"Stereo Soldier"	2012	Little Mix	DNA	check	check
"I Like It"	2012	JLS	Evolution		check
"Personal"	2012	Olly Murs	Right Place Right Time	check	check
"Hand On Heart"	2012	Olly Murs	Right Place Right Time	check	check
"DNA"	2012	Little Mix	DNA	check	check
"Wings"	2012	Little Mix	DNA	check	check
"Overload" feat. TMS	2012	Dot Rotten	Voices In My Head	check	check
"Are You Not Entertained?"	2012	Dot Rotten	Voices In My Head	check	check
"Rockstar" feat. Brian May	2012	Dappy	Bad Intentions	check	check
"Read All About It, Pt III"	2012	Emeli Sandé	Our Version Of Events	check	
"Keep It On A Low"	2011	Dot Rotten	Voices In My Head	check	check
"Going Through Hell" (Dot Rotten Remix)	2011	The Streets	Computers and Blues		check
"Dub On The Track" feat. Mic Righteous, Dot Rotten and Ghetts	2011	Cher Lloyd	Sticks and Stones		check
"Do You Think Of Me?"	2011	Misha B	Non-album single	check	check
"Trouble" feat. Luciana	2011	Professor Green	At Your Convenience	check	check
"Read All About It"	2011	Professor Green	At Your Convenience	check	check
"No Regrets"	2011	Dappy	Bad Intentions	check	check
"Hush Little Baby" feat. Ed Sheeran	2011	Wretch 32	Black and White	check	check
"Spaceship" with Dappy	2011	Tinchy Stryder	Non-album single	check	check
"Walk This Road"	2010	Tinchy Stryder	Third Strike	check	check
"Gangsta"	2010	Tinchy Stryder	Third Strike	check	check
"Take The World"	2010	Tinchy Stryder	Third Strike	check	check
"I'm Landing"	2009	Tinchy Stryder	Catch 22	check	check
"Blank Expression"	2006	Lily Allen	Alright, Still		check

== Awards and nominations ==
2023

Brit Awards

. • Nominated: Song Of The Year - Lewis Capaldi "Forget Me"

2022

Ivor Novello Awards

• Nominated: Best Song Musically and Lyrically - Ella Henderson and Tom Grennan "Let's Go Home Together"

2021

Ivor Novello Awards

• Nominated: PRS for Music Most Performed Work - Lewis Capaldi "Before You Go"

• Nominated: PRS for Music Most Performed Work - Lewis Capaldi "Someone You Loved"

63rd Annual Grammy Awards

• Won: Best Pop Vocal Album - Dua Lipa "Future Nostalgia"

• Won: Best R&B Album - John Legend "Bigger Love"

• Nominated: Album of the Year - Dua Lipa "Future Nostalgia"

2020

American Music Awards

• Nominated: Favourite Pop/Rock song - Lewis Capaldi "Someone You Loved"

Mercury Prize

• Shortlisted: Dua Lipa "Future Nostalgia"

Ivor Novello Awards

• Nominated: PRS for Music Most Performed Work - Lewis Capaldi "Someone You Loved"

BMI London Awards

• Won: Most Performed Work - Lewis Capaldi "Someone You Loved"

BMI Pop Awards

• Won: Most Performed Work - Lewis Capaldi "Someone You Loved"

ASCAP Pop Awards

• Won: Most Performed Work - Lewis Capaldi "Someone You Loved"

Brit Awards

. • Won: Song Of The Year - Lewis Capaldi "Someone You Loved"

62nd Annual Grammy Awards

• Nominated: Song Of The Year - Lewis Capaldi "Someone You Loved"

2019

BBC Radio 1 Teen Awards

• Won: Best Single - Lewis Capaldi "Someone You Loved"

A&R Awards

• Won: Song Of The Year - Lewis Capaldi "Someone You Loved"

Q Awards

• Won: Best Track - Lewis Capaldi "Someone You Loved"

Brit Awards

• Nominated: Best Album - Anne-Marie "Speak Your Mind"

2018

Brit Awards

• Nominated: Best Album - Dua Lipa "Dua Lipa"

2016

BMI RnB & Hip Hop Awards

• Won: Most Performed RnB and Hip Hop Song - G-Eazy + Bebe Rexha "Me, Myself & I"

BMI London Awards

• Won: Most Performed Work - G-Eazy + Bebe Rexha "Me, Myself & I"

ASCAP London Awards

• Won: Most Performed Work - G-Eazy + Bebe Rexha "Me, Myself & I"

BMI Pop Awards

• Won: Most Performed Work - G-Eazy + Bebe Rexha "Me, Myself & I"

ASCAP Pop Awards

• Won: Most Performed Work - G-Eazy + Bebe Rexha "Me, Myself & I"

2014

BBC Radio 1's Teen Awards

• Won: Best British Single - The Vamps "Last Night"

2013

Brit Awards

• Won: Best Album - Emeli Sandé "Our Version of Events"

2012

MOBO Awards

. • Won: Best Album - Emeli Sandé "Read All About It"

2011

MOBO Awards

• Won: Best Video - Emeli Sandé "Read All About It"
