= Nobody to Love =

2014 single by Sigma

Single by Sigma

from the album Life
- Released: 6 April 2014
- Genre: Drum and bass
- Length: 4:12
- Label: 3Beat; All Around the World
- Songwriters: Kanye West; John Stephens; Charlie Wilson; Che Pope; Elon Rutberg; Cydel Young; Malik Jones; Sakiya Sandifer; Mike Dean; Norman Whiteside; Bob Massey; Robert Dukes; Ronnie Self
- Producer: Sigma

Sigma singles chronology
"Rudeboy" (2013)	"Nobody to Love" (2014)	"Changing" (2014)

Music video
- "Nobody to Love" on YouTube

"Nobody to Love" is a song by British record production duo Sigma. The song was originally a bootleg remix of "Bound 2" by Kanye West featuring Charlie Wilson, released on 24 January 2014 as a free download. It later received support from major British radio stations including BBC Radio 1 and 1Xtra, and so was reworked into an original track with Wilson's vocals covered by former One True Voice member Daniel Pearce. It was released as the second single from their debut studio album, Life (2015).

The song topped the UK Singles Chart upon release, making it not only Sigma's first UK number one but also their first ever top 40 single. It sold over 121,000 copies in the first week. It also topped the charts in Poland and New Zealand and reached the top three in Flanders and Ireland, as well as number 11 in Australia.

== Background and composition ==
"Nobody to Love" was originally a bootleg remix of American rapper Kanye West's 2013 single "Bound 2", featuring Charlie Wilson. Sigma frequently played the remix in nightclubs around the UK and received positive feedback. The remix was released on 24 January 2014 as a free download and, after the duo sent it to some DJs at BBC Radio 1, they "got really behind it" and record labels later started approaching Sigma. This led them to rework it into an original song, with Wilson's vocals covered by former One True Voice member Daniel Pearce. The beginning of the song's original mix samples "Think (About It)" by Lyn Collins. The female voice saying "uh huh, honey" is a sample of "Sweet Nothin's" performed by Brenda Lee.

== Music video ==
A music video to accompany the release of "Nobody to Love" was directed by Craig Moore and was filmed in Cape Town, South Africa. It was first released onto YouTube on 24 March 2014 at a total length of four minutes and four seconds. The video features South African models Liv de Klerk and Nicole Naude on a road trip, described as "Thelma and Louise reinvented".

== Track listing ==
Digital download – single
No.	Title	Length
1.	"Nobody to Love"	4:12

Digital download – US version
No.	Title	Length
1.	"Nobody to Love"	3:13

Digital download – EP
No.	Title	Length
1.	"Nobody to Love" (Sigma's Future Jungle mix)	4:31
2.	"Nobody to Love" (Jakwob remix)	4:15
3.	"Nobody to Love" (Grum radio edit)	3:57
4.	"Nobody to Love" (Grum remix)	5:01
5.	"Nobody to Love" (instrumental edit)	3:58

Digital download – remix EP (part two)
No.	Title	Length
1.	"Nobody to Love" (Third Party remix)	5:17
2.	"Nobody to Love" (TS7 remix)	4:41
3.	"Nobody to Love" (TS7 radio edit)	3:00

CD single
No.	Title	Length
1.	"Nobody to Love" (radio edit)	3:10
2.	"Nobody to Love" (extended mix)	4:04

== Credits and personnel ==
Credits are adapted from the CD single liner notes.

- Songwriting – Kanye West, John Stephens, Charlie Wilson, Che Pope, Elon Rutberg, Cydel Young, Malik Jones, Sakiya Sandifer, Mike Dean, Norman Whiteside, Bob Massey, Robert Dukes, Ronnie Self
- Production and keyboards – Cameron Edwards, Joe Lenzie
- Additional programming and keyboards – Hal Ritson, Richard Adlam
- Vocals – Daniel Pearce
- Backing vocals – Yolanda Quartey

== Charts ==
=== Weekly charts ===
Chart (2014)	Peak position
Australia (ARIA)	11
Austria (Ö3 Austria Top 40)	4
Belgium (Ultratop 50 Flanders)	2
Belgium Dance (Ultratop Flanders)	1
Belgium (Ultratop 50 Wallonia)	34
Belgium Dance (Ultratop Wallonia)	38
Czech Republic Airplay (ČNS IFPI)	4
Czech Republic Singles Digital (ČNS IFPI)	18
Denmark (Tracklisten)	21
Germany (GfK)	7
Hungary (Rádiós Top 40)	26
Hungary (Single Top 40)	4
Ireland (IRMA)	3
Mexico Anglo (Monitor Latino)	7
Netherlands (Dutch Top 40)	7
Netherlands (Single Top 100)	14
New Zealand (Recorded Music NZ)	1
Poland Airplay (ZPAV)	1
Poland Dance (ZPAV)	12
Scottish Singles Sales (Official Charts)	1
Slovakia Airplay (ČNS IFPI)	1
Slovakia Singles Digital (ČNS IFPI)	13
Slovenia (SloTop50)	4
Sweden (Sverigetopplistan)	52
Switzerland (Schweizer Hitparade)	8
UK Singles (Official Charts)	1
UK Dance (Official Charts)	1
US Hot Dance/Electronic Songs (Billboard)	29

=== Year-end charts ===
Chart (2014)	Position
Australia (ARIA)	84
Austria (Ö3 Austria Top 40)	39
Belgium (Ultratop 50 Flanders)	16
Germany (Official German Charts)	32
Hungary (Single Top 40)	22
Netherlands (Dutch Top 40)	30
Netherlands (Single Top 100)	51
New Zealand (Recorded Music NZ)	41
Poland (ZPAV)	12
Slovenia (SloTop50)	32
Switzerland (Schweizer Hitparade)	55
UK Singles (OCC)	15
US Hot Dance/Electronic Songs (Billboard)	79

Chart (2015)	Position
Slovenia (SloTop50)	47

Chart (2018)	Position
Hungary (Rádiós Top 40)	85

== Certifications ==
Region	Certification	Certified units/sales
Australia (ARIA)	Platinum	70,000^{^}
Belgium (BRMA)	Gold	15,000^{*}
Germany (BVMI)	Platinum	300,000^{‡}
New Zealand (RMNZ)	2× Platinum	60,000^{‡}
United Kingdom (BPI)	2× Platinum	1,200,000^{‡}
Streaming
Denmark (IFPI Danmark)	Gold	1,300,000^{†}
^{*} Sales figures based on certification alone.^{^} Shipments figures based on certification alone.^{‡} Sales+streaming figures based on certification alone.^{†} Streaming-only figures based on certification alone.

== Release history ==
Region	Date	Format	Label
Worldwide	6 April 2014	Digital download	3Beat; All Around the World
Netherlands	17 April 2014	Digital download	3Beat; Spinnin'
United States	12 August 2014	Digital download	Island; Republic
