= Sigma (DJs) =

English drum and bass duo

- Origin: Harpenden, England
- Genres: Drum and bass; house; trap
- Years active: 2007–present
- Labels: All Around the World; 3Beat; Hospital; Breakbeat Kaos; Life
- Members: Cameron Edwards; Joe Lenzie
- Past members: Ben Mauerhoff
- Website: sigmahq.com

Sigma are an English drum and bass DJ and record production duo consisting of Cameron James Edwards and Joseph Aluin Lenzie. They met at Leeds University at drum and bass nights. Their 2010 collaboration with DJ Fresh, "Lassitude", peaked at number 98 on the UK Singles Chart. Their single "Nobody to Love" topped the UK Singles Chart, becoming their first UK number one. Their second was the follow-up single "Changing", featuring Paloma Faith.

== Career ==
=== 2006–2009: Formation and career beginnings ===
Lenzie and Edwards met in 2006 at Leeds University; Edwards was working in local record store Tribe Records and with Echo Location's Obi running local night Event Horizon, while Lenzie was DJing hip-hop and warming up Event Horizon for acts. Once they had finished in Leeds, they relocated to London and became a three-piece with Ben Mauerhoff, being signed under DJ Fresh's Breakbeat Kaos. After a while, Mauerhoff left. In December 2008, they formed their own record label, Life Recordings (so called because, according to Lenzie, the industry demanded that it be their life). Its inaugural release was a VIP mix of their early Bingo Beats single "El Presidente".

=== 2009–2012: Stand Tall and Night & Day EPs ===
Sigma have produced music through Hospital Records. In June 2009, they made the song "Paint It Black" for the compilation album Sick Music. Later that year, they released their second Life Recordings release "Nexus" / "Front to Back". In 2010, the duo released their two-part Stand Tall EP on the drum and bass label, Breakbeat Kaos. In December 2010, Sigma and DJ Fresh released the single "Lassitude" featuring Koko as the fifth single from DJ Fresh's album Kryptonite. The song became one of their first charting singles as it peaked at number 98 on the UK Singles Chart and number 11 on the UK Dance Chart. After the release of their late-2011 Night & Day EPs on their label, in 2012, Sigma toured the UK, Europe, Australasia and the United States. They were the supporting act for DJ Fresh on his first live UK tour. The tour included dates supporting fellow former Leeds student Christopher Mercer (also known as Rusko).

=== 2013–2015: Breakthrough and Life ===
The duo signed to 3 Beat Records in the summer of 2013. They had also remixed tracks for Ellie Goulding, Eric Prydz, Skepta and Sway. Following their remix of the Stylo G single "Soundbwoy", they released their debut single with 3Beat, "Summer Calling", featuring Taylor Fowlis. Their second single with 3Beat, "Rudeboy", featuring Doctor, was released in December 2013. The song peaked at number 56 on the UK Singles Chart and number 12 on the UK Dance Chart. They released their third single with 3Beat, "Nobody to Love" (a rework of Kanye West's "Bound 2"), on 6 April 2014. It topped the UK Singles Chart upon release. To celebrate, they released a new song, "Divine", for free download on 16 April 2014. In July 2014, Sigma announced their single "Changing" co-written by Ella Eyre and featuring vocals from Paloma Faith; it was released on 14 September 2014 and became their second consecutive number one song on the UK Singles Chart. Their third single "Higher" featuring Labrinth, premiered on Annie Mac's Radio 1 show on 16 January 2015. It was featured in the game Madden NFL 16. In February 2015, Sigma debuted their live show in Sydney as part Future Music Festival. Sigma returned to the UK in April to embark on their first headline live tour of the UK, selling out all dates and culminating at Electric Brixton.

Sigma's fourth single "Glitterball" was released on 24 July 2015 and features vocals from Ella Henderson. The song secured Sigma their third iTunes number one and reached number four on the UK Singles Chart. "Redemption" with Diztortion and featuring Jacob Banks, released on 2 October 2015, was the fifth single from the upcoming debut studio album. In November 2015, Sigma embarked on a 10-date headline live tour of the UK. Their debut studio album Life was released on 4 December 2015. The album debuted at number 28 on the UK Albums Chart. In 2016, Sigma announced their biggest headline tour including a date at the O2 Academy Brixton, London. Sigma were announced as one of the headline acts at the pro-Brexit music event Bpoplive, but pulled out on learning that it was a political event. Sigma stated that they in no way supported the beliefs of the organisers and promptly pulled out on learning this information.

=== 2016–2025: Hope ===
On 11 March 2016, Sigma released their first single of their upcoming second studio album entitled "Nightingale". The music video to this song was their first video to be recorded in VR. On 20 May 2016, Sigma released their next single "Cry" which saw them collaborate with multiple Brit Award winners Take That. The song featured on the group's eighth studio album Wonderland. On 4 November 2016, Sigma released their most commercially successful single since Life, in the form of "Find Me", which featured vocals from British singer Birdy. The song has been certified Silver in the UK. Almost a year later, Sigma released "Forever", the fourth single from their upcoming album, which features Quavo and Sebastian Kole and was released on 20 October 2017. Two months later, a remix version of the song was released which featured additional vocals from Tinie Tempah and Yxng Bane. On 15 June 2018, Sigma released "Anywhere" as the fifth single from their upcoming second album. On 12 July, Sigma released a reworked version of Nelly and Kelly Rowland's 2002 single "Dilemma".

Sigma performed a European tour with grime artist NAHLI.

On 12 June 2020, Sigma released the single "High on You" in collaboration with British singer-songwriter John Newman.

Sigma released their long-awaited second studio album, Hope, on 17 June 2022.

=== 2025–present: Day One ===
In October 2025, the Leeds-based drum and bass DJ and producer duo released their fourth studio album, "Day One", under their independent record label, Day Ones. The project marks a return to their underground roots after several years in the mainstream, focusing on raw sounds and independent collaborations that explore contemporary jungle and bass music. The album includes tracks such as 'Nobody' and 'Breathe', highlighting the duo's creative independence and offering a nostalgic reflection on their origins within the British music scene of the 2000s.

== In popular culture ==
In 2012, their remix of Rusko's "Somebody to Love" was featured in Forza Horizon. In 2017, their song "Night Drive" was featured in the Codemasters game, Dirt 4.

== Discography ==
- Life (2015)
- Hope (2022)
- London Sound (2024)
- Day One (2025)
- Country Greaze (2026)

== Awards and nominations ==
=== DJ Awards ===
Year	Category	Outcome	Ref.
2015	Best Bass DJ	Nominated	
2016	Best Bass DJ	Nominated	
2017	Best Bass DJ	Nominated	
