= Back from the Edge Tour =

2017 concert tour by James Arthur

James Arthur Tour
- United Kingdom tour by James Arthur
- Associated album: Back from the Edge
- Start date: 6 March 2017
- End date: 30 November 2017
- Legs: 2
- No. of shows: 36

James Arthur concert chronology
- The Story So Far Tour (2015); Back from the Edge Tour (2017); You – Up Close and Personal Tour (2019)

The Back from the Edge Tour is the third headlining tour by British singer and songwriter James Arthur in support of his second studio album Back from the Edge. It consists of 16 concerts, 11 arena shows and 9 worldwide concerts and is his first tour since signing to Columbia Records in Germany and re-signing to Syco Music.

The tour was announced via his Twitter account on 1 November 2016. On 13 March 2017, it was announced that that evening's scheduled concert at the O2 Academy in Sheffield was postponed due to James being ordered to go on vocal rest by doctors. The rescheduled concert will be on 29 May 2017. On 3 April 2017, further UK dates as well as dates in Belfast and Dublin were announced on Twitter with the concerts set to be held in November.

== Set list ==
These set lists are representative of the shows on 29 May and 18 November 2017 respectively. They do not represent all concerts for the duration of the tour.

Leg 1

1. "Back from the Edge"
2. "Prisoner"
3. "You're Nobody 'til Somebody Loves You"
4. "Sermon"
5. "Train Wreck"
6. "Impossible"
7. "Sober"
8. "I Am"
9. "Get Down"
10. "Safe Inside"
11. "Recovery"
12. "Skeletons"
13. "Rockabye" (Clean Bandit cover)
14. "Phoenix"
15. "Can I Be Him"
16. "Say You Won't Let Go"

Leg 2 – Arena Tour

1. "Back from the Edge"
2. "I Am"
3. "Recovery"
4. "Impossible"
5. "Sermon"
6. "Sober"
7. "Roses"
8. "Careless Whisper" (George Michael cover)
9. "Safe Inside"
10. "You're Nobody 'til Somebody Loves You" (contains excerpt of "Cry Me a River")
11. "Certain Things"
12. "Let's Go Home Together" (with Ella Henderson)
13. "Get Down"
14. "Can I Be Him"
15. "Naked"
16. "Sun Comes Up"
17. "Say You Won't Let Go"

== Tour dates ==
Date	City	Country	Venue	Support Act
Europe
6 March 2017	Norwich	England	Norwich UEA	Matt Gresham
7 March 2017	Southend	England	Cliffs Pavilion	Matt Gresham
9 March 2017	Newcastle	England	O2 Academy	Matt Gresham
10 March 2017	Glasgow	Scotland	O2 Academy	Matt Gresham
11 March 2017	Manchester	England	O2 Apollo	Matt Gresham
13 March 2017	Sheffield	England	O2 Academy	Matt Gresham
14 March 2017	Leicester	England	De Montfort Hall	Matt Gresham
16 March 2017	Plymouth	England	Plymouth Pavilions	Matt Gresham
17 March 2017	Bournemouth	England	O2 Academy	Matt Gresham
18 March 2017	Cardiff	Wales	St. David's Hall	Matt Gresham
20 March 2017	London	England	O2 Shepherd's Bush Empire	Matt Gresham
21 March 2017	London	England	O2 Shepherd's Bush Empire	Matt Gresham
23 March 2017	Bristol	England	O2 Academy	Matt Gresham
24 March 2017	Birmingham	England	O2 Academy	Matt Gresham
25 March 2017	Leeds	England	O2 Academy	Matt Gresham
26 March 2017	Manchester	England	O2 Apollo	Matt Gresham
Asia
22 May 2017	Tokyo	Japan	Akasaka BLITZ	—
23 May 2017	Nagoya	Japan	Nagoya Club Quattro	—
24 May 2017	Osaka	Japan	BIGCAT	—
Europe
31 May 2017	Paris	France	Elysee Montmartre	Matt Gresham
1 June 2017	Brussels	Belgium	Ancienne Belgique	Matt Gresham
2 June 2017	Luxembourg	Luxembourg	Den Atelier	Matt Gresham
6 June 2017	Cologne	Germany	E-Werk	Matt Gresham
7 June 2017	Frankfurt	Germany	Batschkapp	Matt Gresham
8 June 2017	Munich	Germany	Muffathalle	Matt Gresham
16 November 2017	Leeds	England	First Direct Arena	Ella Henderson
17 November 2017	Liverpool	England	Echo Arena	Ella Henderson
18 November 2017	Newcastle	England	Metro Radio Arena	Ella Henderson
20 November 2017	Belfast	Northern Ireland	The SSE Arena, Belfast	Ella Henderson
21 November 2017	Dublin	Ireland	3Arena	Ella Henderson
23 November 2017	Cardiff	Wales	Motorpoint Arena	Ella Henderson
24 November 2017	London	England	The SSE Arena, Wembley	Ella Henderson
25 November 2017	Birmingham	England	Genting Arena	Ella Henderson
27 November 2017	Nottingham	England	Motorpoint Arena	Ella Henderson
28 November 2017	Glasgow	Scotland	The SSE Hydro	Ella Henderson
30 November 2017	Bournemouth	England	Bournemouth International Centre	Ella Henderson

Rescheduled date

Date	City	Country	Venue
29 May 2017	Sheffield	England	O2 Academy
