= Sweatpants (Paloma Faith song) =

2024 single by Paloma Faith

Single by Paloma Faith

from the album The Glorification of Sadness
- Released: 16 February 2024
- Length: 3:31
- Label: Sony; RCA
- Songwriters: Paloma Faith; Evan Blair; Clarence Coffee Jr.
- Producers: Martin Wave; TommyD; Jamie McEvoy

Paloma Faith singles chronology
"Pressure" (2024)	"Sweatpants" (2024)	"Gone" (2026)

"Sweatpants" is a song by British singer-songwriter Paloma Faith. It was released on 16 February 2024 by Sony Music and RCA Records as the fourth and final single from her sixth studio album, The Glorification of Sadness. It was written by Faith, Evan Blair and Clarence Coffee Jr., and produced by Martin Wave, TommyD, and vocal producer Jamie McEvoy.

== Background ==
The lead single from Faith's sixth studio album, The Glorification of Sadness, "How You Leave a Man" was released on 11 October 2023, which she described as "one of the most life-changing moments" of her life. It was followed by the second single "Bad Woman", centered on a message of female empowerment. "Pressure", the album's third single featuring British artist Kojey Radical, was released on 19 January 2024.

"Sweatpants" was released as the fourth and final single from The Glorification of Sadness, in conjunction with the album on 16 February 2024.

== Charts ==
"Swearpants" chart performance
Chart (2024)	Peak position
UK Singles Sales Chart (OCC)	74
UK Singles Downloads Chart (OCC)	70
