= The Glorification of Sadness =

Studio album by Paloma Faith
- Released: 16 February 2024
- Genres: Soul; R&B
- Length: 52:45
- Labels: Sony UK; RCA
- Producers: Chase & Status; Fred Cox; Jack & Coke; Martin Wave; TommyD; Andrew Wells

Paloma Faith chronology
Infinite Things (2020)	The Glorification of Sadness (2024)	In Full Colour (2027)

Singles from The Glorification of Sadness
- 1. "How You Leave a Man" Released: 11 October 2023; 2. "Bad Woman" Released: 24 November 2023; 3. "Pressure" Released: 19 January 2024; 4. "Sweatpants" Released: 16 February 2024

The Glorification of Sadness is the sixth studio album by British singer Paloma Faith. It was released on 16 February 2024, through Sony Music UK and RCA Records. Serving as executive producer, Faith worked with collaborators including Chase & Status, Kojey Radical, and Amy Wadge. Four singles were released from the album: lead single "How You Leave a Man", "Bad Woman", "Pressure" and "Sweatpants".

The Glorification of Sadness is a chronologically structured album in which Faith narrates the emotional journey of leaving a long-term relationship. Critics praised the album's honest storytelling, vocal delivery, and diverse musical approach, highlighting its balance between raw emotion and uplifting moments. The Glorification of Sadness debuted and peaked at number two in both the UK Albums Chart and the Scottish Albums Chart.

== Background and concept ==
In October 2023, Faith revealed that her upcoming album would be "pretty personal", stressing how "nervous" she was to put her private life out into public. It was produced by Swedish producer Martin Wave, who initially worked on only one song but became the "cornerstone of the album". Faith described The Glorification of Sadness as a "divorce album without the divorce", written during the aftermath of her separation from her partner of ten years, with whom she has two children. The album was inspired by the breakup with Leyman Lahcine in 2022, and became a means for her to process a wide range of emotions—grief, resilience, anger, and even euphoria—following the split. She attributed the relationship's breakdown to the changes brought on by becoming a mother in 2016, a transition that proved difficult for the couple to navigate. While acknowledging the challenges, she emphasized that she had no regrets, as her children were "worth it." Writing for the album not only allowed her to reflect on that period but it also served as an emotional outlet, helping her reconnect with her identity beyond motherhood and partnership.

Faith described the process of making the album as shedding the need to pretend, embracing her purest truth. While deeply personal, Faith also expressed her determination to keep evolving, citing artists like Tina Turner and David Bowie as inspirations. Rejecting the notion that she has passed her career peak, she stated, "I tend to think there's always an anomaly... and I want to be it." While she hoped for chart success, she valued her relatability with listeners, jokingly calling herself "the people's princess". She was credited as an executive producer on The Glorification of Sadness, marking the first time she formally acknowledged her involvement in the album's production process.

Alongside the album, Faith was also working on a book that delves into the experience of being a woman in a post-feminist society. Titled MILF (Motherhood, Identity, Love, and Fuckery), the memoir discusses Faith's experiences with in vitro fertilisation (IVF), early motherhood, and questions of identity and self-perception.

== Composition ==
The Glorification of Sadness blends elements of soul and R&B, with a contemporary sound that distinguishes it from Faith's previous releases. She described the album as "probably more contemporary than I've put out [previously]" while reaffirming her long-standing connection to soul and R&B: "Let's not knock it! I've always been in soul and R&B." The album, inspired by her experiences following her separation, reflects both artistic and personal changes.

"Eat Shit and Die"
A 14-second sample from "Eat Shit and Die". The singer herself highlighted the line "I'm not here for your pleasure; I'm working on me" as a reflection of her trademark humour and assertive, light-hearted response to her breakup.

The album's tracklist follows a chronological order and it reflects Faith's emotional journey through grief, guilt, and self-reflection. It opens with "Sweatpants", a ballad that combines emotional lyricism with subtle electronic elements. "Pressure", featuring Kojey Radical, incorporates hip-hop elements, and "God in a Dress" explores feminist ideas through its assertive lyrics. "How You Leave a Man" presents a confident and expressive vocal performance, featuring epic orchestration and hair metal-style guitar solos. "There's Nothing More Human Than Failure" presents a spoken-word gospel style. "Bad Woman" delivers themes of empowerment and resistance to societal expectations. "Cry on the Dance Floor" introduces a dance and pop banger sound. "Say My Name" highlights Faith asserting herself vocally, while soft rock anthem "Let It Ride" continues the album's exploration of self-expression. "The Big Bang Ending" and "Hate When You're Happy" contribute to the album's thematic portrayal of breakup and personal growth. "Eat Shit and Die" adopts doo-wop influences and a humorous tone, shifting toward a message of personal independence. "Divorce" is an orchestral ballad addressing the emotional aftermath of separation. "Mirror to Mirror" serves as an entr'acte with cinematic ambience, contributing to the album's soundtrack-like quality. The album concludes with "Already Broken", which serves as a defiant and reflective closing track.

== Promotion ==
=== Singles ===
The lead single, "How You Leave a Man" was released on 11 October 2023, which she described as "one of the most life-changing moments" of her life. Following that, Faith released "Bad Woman" on 24 November 2023, which carries "a message of female empowerment at its very forefront". "Pressure", a collaboration with British artist Kojey Radical, was released on 19 January 2024 as the third single. The song originated from a chorus sent to her by Liam Bailey and was later co-written with Gez O'Connell. The fourth and final single, "Sweatpants", was released simultaneously with the album on 16 February.

On 21 February 2024, the track "Enjoy Yourself" was announced as a single for the 2024 Red Nose Day campaign, organized by Comic Relief. On that date, the song was issued as a digital single. An exclusive pre-sale on Amazon was also opened for two physical editions of the song—on CD and 7-inch vinyl—released on 8 March 2024.

=== Tour ===
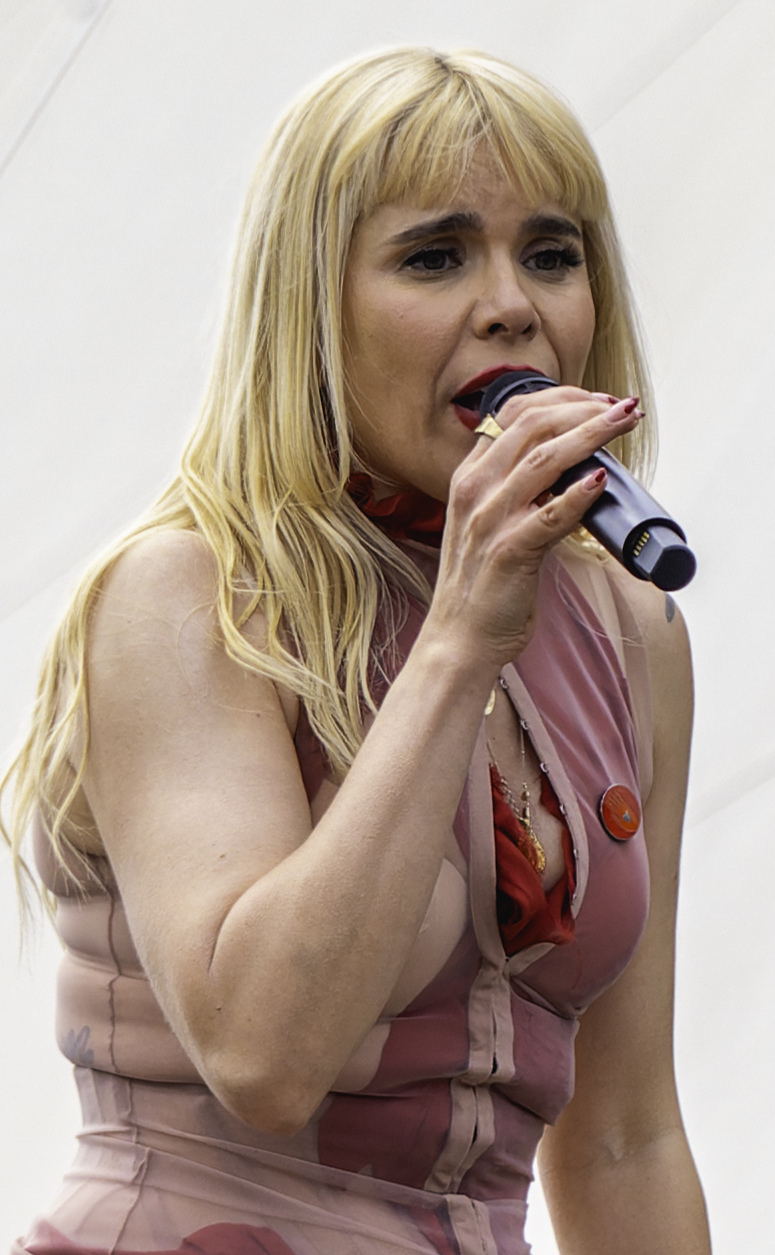
Faith performing in Glastonbury Festival 2024

To support the album, Faith was set to embark on The Glorification of Sadness Tour 2024 which performs across the UK and Ireland. The 35-date tour began in Reading with a headline show at The Hexagon, and it includes a performance at London's Eventim Apollo, before concluding in Lincoln. She was scheduled to continue the tour with upcoming performances including Glastonbury Festival on 30 June, and shows in London, Cardiff, Coventry, and Leeds.

== Critical reception ==
Professional ratings
Review scores
Source	Rating
Clash	8/10
Hot Press	7/10
Retropop	4/5 stars
Stereoboard	3/5 stars

The album received generally positive reviews. Clash awarded the album an 8 out of 10, praising it as a "succinct, soulful, and sublime" exploration of emotion and reinvention. Louder Than War has described Faith's new album as blending personal experiences with universal emotions. Retropop magazine's George McHugh described the album marked a welcome return to form, as her previous record, Infinite Things (2020), "often didn't pack the punch of her earlier releases." Stereoboard described the album as a record that, given its backstory, had the potential to be perfect, but felt too long and at times lacklustre despite its high points. RIFF Magazine wrote that the strength of The Glorification of Sadness lies in its portrayal of the effort required to overcome hardship, suggesting that reflection can lead to growth and self-discovery.

== Track listing ==
The Glorification of Sadness track listing
No.	Title	Writer(s)	Producer(s)	Length
1.	"Sweatpants"	Paloma Faith; Evan Blair; Clarence Coffee Jr.	Martin Wave; TommyD; Jamie McEvoy^{[v]}	3:31
2.	"Pressure" (featuring Kojey Radical)	Faith; Kojey Radical; Gerard O'Connell; Saul Milton; Tommy Baxter; William Kennard	Chase & Status; Baxter^{[a]}; O'Connell^{[a]}; McEvoy^{[v]}	3:44
3.	"God in a Dress"	Faith; Wave; JBach; Neil Ormandy; Kelsy Karter	Wave; McEvoy^{[v]}	3:41
4.	"How You Leave a Man"	Andrew Wells; Charlie Puth; Elle King; Jacob Kasher Hindlin	Wells; Wave	3:34
5.	"There's Nothing More Human Than Failure"	Faith	Wave; McEvoy^{[v]}	1:19
6.	"Bad Woman"	Faith; Fred Cox; Holly Lapsley Fletcher	Cox; Wave; McEvoy^{[v]}	2:44
7.	"Cry on the Dance Floor"	Faith; MJ Cole; Nat Dunn	Wave; Julius; McEvoy^{[v]}	4:13
8.	"Say My Name"	Faith; Michael Stafford; Cox; Liam Bailey; Koda	Cox; McEvoy^{[v]}	2:55
9.	"Let It Ride"	Faith; Ormandy; Karter; JBach	Wave; McEvoy^{[v]}	3:20
10.	"The Big Bang Ending"	Faith	Wave; McEvoy^{[v]}	0:41
11.	"Eat Shit and Die"	Faith; Cox; Fletcher; Ormandy; Bailey	Cox; McEvoy^{[v]}	3:12
12.	"Divorce"	Faith; Edward Carlile; Savannah Iley	TommyD; Wave; McEvoy^{[v]}	4:21
13.	"Hate When You're Happy"	Faith; Baxter; O'Connell; Dayyon Alexander	Baxter; McEvoy^{[v]}	3:53
14.	"Enjoy Yourself"	Faith; Talay Riley; Edward Thomas	Wave; McEvoy^{[v]}	2:52
15.	"I Am Enough"	Faith; Cox; Bailey	Cox; McEvoy^{[v]}	4:05
16.	"Mirror to Mirror"	Faith	Wave; McEvoy^{[v]}	0:36
17.	"Already Broken"	Faith; Svante Halldin; Jakob Hazell; Amy Wadge	Wave; Jack & Coke; McEvoy^{[v]}	4:04
Total length:				52:45

=== Notes ===
- ^{^[a]} signifies an assistant producer.
- ^{^[v]} signifies a vocal producer.

== Personnel ==
=== Musicians ===
- Paloma Faith – vocals
- Janelle Martin-Cousins – background vocals
- Matt Maijah – background vocals
- Naomi Miller – background vocals
- Shanice Steele – background vocals (tracks 1, 3–12, 14, 15, 17)
- Evan Blair – background vocals (track 1)
- Martin Wave – guitar (tracks 1, 3, 11), bass guitar (1), background vocals (4); drums, piano (12); strings (14)
- Ash Soan – drums (tracks 1, 6, 17)
- Bryony James – cello (tracks 1, 12)
- Rosie Danvers – cello, strings (tracks 1, 12)
- Emma Owens – viola (tracks 1, 12)
- Ellie Stanford – violin (tracks 1, 12)
- Hayley Pomfrett – violin (tracks 1, 12)
- Jenny Sacha – violin (tracks 1, 12)
- Patrick Kiernan – violin (tracks 1, 12)
- Steve Morris – violin (tracks 1, 12)
- Meghan Cassidy – viola (track 1)
- Miles Brett – violin (track 1)
- Sally Jackson – violin (track 1)
- Sarah Sexton – violin (track 1)
- Teni Tinks – background vocals (tracks 2, 13)
- Låpsley – background vocals (track 6)
- Liam Bailey – background vocals (track 8)
- Fred Cox – bass guitar, drums, guitar, keyboards, piano, programming (tracks 8, 15)
- Maverick Sabre – background vocals (track 8)
- George Moore – piano (track 8)
- Kelsy Karter – background vocals (track 9)
- Oumi Kapila – guitar (track 9)
- Martyn Jackson – violin (track 12), instrumentation (17)
- Andrew Marshall – double bass (track 12)
- Wired Strings – strings (track 12)
- Clifton Harrison – viola (track 12)
- Charis Jenson – violin (track 12)
- Natalia Bonner – violin (track 12)
- Talay Riley – background vocals (track 14)
- Christopher Allan – instrumentation (track 17)
- Claire O'Connell – instrumentation (track 17)
- Dai Emanuel – instrumentation (track 17)
- Elizabeth Ball – instrumentation (track 17)
- Eos Counsell – instrumentation (track 17)
- Francis Kefford – instrumentation (track 17)
- Ian Burdge – instrumentation (track 17)
- Magnus Johnson – instrumentation (track 17)
- Nina Foster – instrumentation (track 17)
- Patrick Savage – instrumentation (track 17)
- Rachael Lander – instrumentation (track 17)
- Richard George – instrumentation (track 17)
- Richard Pryce – instrumentation (track 17)
- Sarah Quinn – instrumentation (track 17)
- Simon Bags – instrumentation (track 17)
- Thomas Kep – instrumentation (track 17)
- Tom Pigott-Smith – Concertmaster (track 17)
- Peter Daley – piano (track 17)
- David Arnold – strings (track 17)
- Isobel Griffiths – strings (track 17)

=== Technical ===
- Colin Leonard – mastering
- Jaycen Joshua – mixing
- Mike Seaberg – mixing (tracks 1–3, 5–17)
- Isabel Gracefield – engineering (tracks 1, 12)
- DJ Riggins – engineering assistance
- Jacob Richards – engineering assistance
- Rachel Blum – engineering assistance

== Charts ==
Chart performance for The Glorification of Sadness
Chart (2024)	Peak position
Belgian Albums (Ultratop Flanders)	115
Scottish Albums (Official Charts)	2
UK Albums (Official Charts)	2
