= Neil Ormandy =

English musician

- Born: Manchester, England
- Genres: Pop, dance, country, rock
- Occupations: Musician; songwriter; record producer
- Instruments: Guitar, keyboards, vocals
- Years active: 1999–present
- Labels: EMI, Mercury
- Website: silomusic.tv

Neil Ormandy is a British musician, songwriter and producer based in Los Angeles. He co-wrote James Arthur's worldwide hit single "Say You Won't Let Go" and is the co-owner of SILO: Music.

== Early life ==
Ormandy was born and raised in Manchester, England.

== Career ==
=== Rushmore ===
When he was 18 years old, Ormandy formed Rushmore, an indie country/pop band, with his older brother Ed Ormandy. They were signed to a publishing deal with EMI in 2000, and a record deal with Kinetic Records in 2001. In 2005, Paul Adam at Island Records signed Rushmore to a development deal, which led to Rushmore signing a record deal with Mercury Records the following year. The band toured with artists including Keith Urban, Simply Red, James Morrison and Paolo Nutini.

=== Songwriting ===
Ormandy moved to Los Angeles in 2009, signing writer-producer deals with Pusher, District Music, Archangel and HTGR, where he began writing music for television, film and advertising campaigns.

In 2014, Ormandy signed a publishing deal with Ultra Music, and launched SILO: Music, which he runs with his brother Jack Ormandy. The company specializes in creating music for television shows, films, film trailers and commercials and managing a collection of top notch pop songwriters and producers. SILO: Music has had songs on television shows including CSI: Crime Scene Investigation; CSI: NY; Arrow; Gotham; Silicon Valley; Nikita; Teen Wolf; and motion picture trailer cues for Clash of the Titans; Green Lantern; Knight and Day; Dead Man Down; The Girl With the Dragon Tattoo; Selma; The Avengers; and the official trailer for Rogue One: A Star Wars Story.

Ormandy co-wrote James Arthur's 2016 single "Say You Won't Let Go", which was a number 1 single in the United Kingdom, Sweden, Australia, Ireland, New Zealand and the Netherlands. In the US, it reached number 11 on the Billboard Hot 100 and number 1 on the Adult Top 40 chart. Currently "Say You Won't Let Go" is the number 11 most streamed songs on Spotify with over 1 billion streams to date.

In 2017 he wrote the single "Breathe" by Eric Prydz featuring Rob Swire, which reached number 27 on the Billboard Dance chart.

In 2018 he co-wrote on three tracks of the Welshly Arms sophomore album No Place Is Home and collaborated with beloved winner of the 2016 America's Got Talent, Grace VanderWaal, on her single “Clearly.” Thus far 2019 has seen the release of Ormandy's co-write on “Girl in the Mirror” by Bebe Rexha from the feature film UglyDolls and the third single of the Dean Lewis debut album, “Stay Awake” which peaked at number 20 on Billboard US Adult Top 40.

Other collaborations include Nick Jonas, Kelly Clarkson, Zara Larsson, Dermot Kennedy, Calum Scott, Alesso, Trippie Redd, Aloe Blacc, Jamie Cullum, Hey Violet, Barns Courtney, Sasha Sloan, Cheat Codes, and Tom Grennan.

== Discography ==
=== Writing and producing credits ===
Year	Artist	Album	Song	Credit
2010	Miss Montreal	So… Anything Else?	"Here Without You"	Writer
2010	Miss Montreal	So… Anything Else?	"Say What You See"	Writer
2010	Sander Kleinenberg feat. Jamie Cullum	5K	"Remember When"	Writer
2011	Sander Kleinenberg feat. Neil Ormandy		"Closer"	Vocals, writer
2013	Gabriel & Dresden feat. Neil Ormandy		"Tomorrow Comes"	Vocals, writer
2013	MYNC, Neil Ormandy		"Searching"	Vocals, writer
2015	Hey Violet	I Can Feel It	"I Can Feel It"	Writer
2015	Ben Haenow feat. Kelly Clarkson	Ben Haenow	"Second Hand Heart"	Writer
2016	Julian Perretta	Karma	"Rich Kid"	Writer, producer
2016	James Arthur	Back from the Edge	"Say You Won't Let Go"	Writer
2016	Leroy Styles feat. Neil Ormandy		"Can't Let Go"	Vocals, writer, producer
2016	Eric Prydz	Opus	"Moody Mondays"	Writer
2016	Eric Prydz	Opus	"Breathe"	Writer
2016	Barns Courtney	The Dull Drums	"Hands"	Writer
2016	MOUNT		"Bend Before We Break"	Writer
2016	Broken Back	Broken Back	"Lady Bitterness"	Writer
2017	Emmit Fenn		"Lost in Space"	Writer
2017	Ricki-Lee Coulter		"Not Too Late"	Writer
2017	MYBADD & Olivia Holt		"Party on a Weekday"	Writer
2017	Barns Courtney	The Attractions of Youth	"Hands"	Writer
2017	Barns Courtney	The Attractions of Youth	"Champion"	Writer
2017	Barns Courtney	The Attractions of Youth	"Rather Die"	Writer
2017	Fancy Cars feat. Neil Ormandy		"Stay the Same"	Vocals, writer
2017	Leo Stannard feat. Frances	In My Blood	"Gravity"	Writer
2017	DVBBS	Blood of My Blood	"Catch"	Writer
2017	SNBRN & BLU J feat. Cara Frew		"You Got Me"	Writer
2017	Deorro	Good Evening	"Guide Me"	Writer
2017	Bunt feat. Neil Ormandy		"Gypsy Heart"	Vocals, writer
2017	Mr Hudson feat. Vic Mensa		"Coldplay"	Writer
2018	Welshly Arms	No Place Is Home	"Sanctuary"	Writer
2018	Welshly Arms	No Place Is Home	"Indestructible"	Writer
2018	Welshly Arms	No Place Is Home	"Unspoken"	Writer
2018	Grace VanderWaal		"Clearly"	Writer
2018	Tyler Shaw	Intuition	"With You"	Writer
2018	Kodaline		"Shed A Tear"	Writer
2018	Alex Aiono		"No Drama"	Writer
2018	Albin Lee Meldau	About You	"I Beg"	Writer
2018	Boyzone	Thank You & Goodnight	"You're Criminal"	Writer
2019	Dean Lewis	A Place We Knew	"Stay Awake"	Writer
2019	Dean Lewis		"Stay Awake (Acoustic)"	Writer
2019	Bebe Rexha	UglyDolls (Original Motion Picture Soundtrack)	"Girl in the Mirror"	Writer
2019	The Score	Pressure	"The Fear"	Writer
2019	Barns Courtney	404	"London Girls"	Writer
2019	Dotan		"Numb"	Writer
2019	Dotan		"Letting Go"	Writer
2019	Fitz and the Tantrums	All the Feels	"Livin' for the Weekend"	Writer
2019	Delaney Jane		"Safe with You"	Writer
2019	TVXQ	XV	"Six in the Morning"	Writer
2019	Audien	Escapism	"Heaven feat. Maty Noyes"	Writer
2019	Ella Henderson	Glorius	"Hold On Me"	Writer
2019	Emerson Hart		"Lucky One"	Writer
2020	Christopher		"Ghost"	Writer
2020	Cheat Codes		"No Service In The Hills feat. Trippie Redd, Blackbear, PRINCE$$ ROSIE"	Writer
2020	Gundelach feat. Aurora		"Cynical Mind"	Writer
2020	Galantis	Church	"Never Felt a Love Like This (with Hook N Sling) [feat. Dotan]"	Writer
2020	Maximillian	Still Alive	"Crossroads"	Writer
2020	Alesso		"Midnight (feat. Liam Payne)"	Writer
2020	Balcony		"He Don't Trust Me"	Writer, producer
2020	Betta Lemme		"I'm Bored"	Writer
2020	Nikhil D'Souza		"People Song"	Writer
2020	Fanny Anderson		"Wake Up"	Writer
2020	Digital Farm Animals, Gaullin feat. Tim North		"Ballin'"	Writer
2020	Jez Dior		"Wasted Youth"	Writer
2020	Tiësto feat. Galxara		"Round & Round"	Writer
2020	Dotan	Numb	"No Words"	Writer
2020	Langston Francis		"Waste My Time"	Writer
2020	Aloe Blacc	All Love Everything	"My Way"	Writer
2020	Paul Kalkbrenner		"Parachute"	Writer
2020	Nicklas Sahl	Unsolvable	"A Friend Like You"	Writer
2020	Wonho	Love Synonym Pt. 1: Right for Me	"Losing You"	Writer
2020	Lukas Graham feat. G-Eazy		"Share That Love"	Writer
2020	NEEDTOBREATHE	Out of Body	"Bottom of a Heartbreak"	Writer
2020	Aloe Blacc	All Love Everything	"Hold On Tight"	Writer
2020	Disciples		"I Got You"	Writer
2020	Aloe Blacc	All Love Everything	"All Love Everything"	Writer
2020	Aloe Blacc	All Love Everything	"Family"	Writer
2020	Aloe Blacc	All Love Everything	"Glory Days"	Writer
2020	Justin Caruso		"Highs & Lows"	Writer
2020	Dotan		"There Will Be a Way"	Writer
2020	Matoma, Michael Bolton		"It's Christmas Time (with Michael Bolton)"	Writer
2020	Lukas Graham		"Share That Love (Acoustic)"	Writer
2020	Aloe Blacc, Steve Aoki		"My Way"	Writer
2021	Lo Vallens		"Rose Tinted Glasses"	Writer
2021	ELI		"Gone"	Writer
2021	Emmit Fenn		"Until We Leave the Ground"	Writer
2021	Julian Perretta		"If I'm Being Honest"	Writer
2021	Emmit Fenn		"Colors"	Writer
2021	Sultan & Shepard, The Cut		"White Lies"	Writer, Artist
2021	Kastra		"Fool For You"	Writer
2021	Klingande		"Better Man"	Writer
2021	James Barre		"Blame It On Us"	Writer
2021	Dotan		"Mercy"	Writer
2021	Birdy	Young Heart	"Deepest Lonely"	Writer
2021	Dotan	Satellites	"With You"	Writer
2021	Dotan	Satellites	"I Will Follow"	Writer
2021	Birdy	Fire: Leo's Songs	"Deepest Lonely"	Writer
2021	Tyler Shaw		"I See You"	Writer
2021	Emmit Fenn	All This To Live For	"Into the Deep"	Writer
2021	Emmit Fenn	All This To Live For	"Do You Feel the Same"	Writer
2021	TELYKast, Sam Gray		"Unbreakable"	Writer
2021	Karen Harding		"You & I (All I Need)"	Writer
2021	Steve Aoki, End of the World		"End of the World"	Writer
2021	Meduza, Hozier		"Tell It To My Heart"	Writer
2021	Aidan Martin		"Easy"	Writer
2021	Oliver Heldens, Anabel Englund		"Deja Vu"	Writer
2022	Aidan Martin, Ofenbach		"Easy (Ofenbach Remix)"	Writer
2022	Aidan Martin, TELYkast		"Easy (TELYKast Remix)"	Writer
2022	Emmit Fenn		"Dumb"	Writer
2022	TELYkast, Teddy Swims		"Loveless (with Teddy Swims)"	Writer
2022	Aidan Martin		"Tears"	Writer
2022	Two Friends feat.John K		"Wish You Were Here (feat. John K)"	Writer
2022	DLMT, TELYKast, Arlissa		"MELODY"	Writer
2022	Oliver Heldens, Tchami, Anabel Englund		"LOW"	Writer
2022	Owenn		"Rest Of My Life"	Writer
2022	CanovA, Giorgia, Ormai		"Nirvana (feat. Giorgia & Ormai)"	Writer
2022	Jake Scott		"She's Not You"	Writer
2022	ILLENIUM, Teddy Swims		"All That Really Matters"	Writer
2022	Benson Boone		"Empty Heart Shaped Box"	Writer
2022	Jolyon Petch, Starley		"I Just Want Your Touch"	Writer
2022	Sam Feldt, David Solomon, Aloe Blacc		"Future In Your Hands (feat. Aloe Blacc)"	Writer
2022	Bas		"Run It Up"	Writer
2022	Aidan Martin		"BOYS"	Producer
2022	TELYKAST, Francis Karel		"Better Now"	Writer
2022	Camylio		"amnesia"	Writer
2023	Drew Love		"Karma Chameleon (The Voyage Edition)"	Producer
2023	Lukas Graham, G-Eazy		"Share That Love (feat. G-Eazy)"	Writer
2023	Surf Mesa, Selah Sol		"City of Love (feat. Selah Sol)"	Writer
2023	Riton, Soaky Siren		"Sugar (feat. Soaky Siren)"	Writer
2023	Felly, Arden Jones		"Crying In Sunshine (feat. Arden Jones)"	Writer
2023	BoyWithUke	Antisocial	"Nosedive"	Writer
2023	Steve Aoki, Jimmie Allen, Dixie D'Amelio		"Older ft Jimmie Allen & Dixie D'Amelio"	Writer
2023	Emmit Fenn		"Friends"	Writer
2023	Bernhoft		"Carry You"	Writer
2023	Hogland		"After Life"	Writer
2023	Nicky Romero, Nico Santos, Jonas Blue		"All You Need Is Love"	Writer
2023	Riton, Belters Only, Enisa		"Never Love Again (feat. Enisa)"	Writer
2023	San Holo, Whethan, Selah Sol		"NO PLACE IS TOO FAR (feat. Whethan & Selah Sol)"	Writer
2023	Dotan		"Diamonds in My Chest"	Writer
2023	Bernhoft	Avenue of Loveless Hearts	"No Place Like Home"	Writer
2023	Bernhoft	Avenue of Loveless Hearts	"I Feel A Change Coming"	Writer
2023	Bernhoft	Avenue of Loveless Hearts	"Feel It the Same"	Writer
2023	Bernhoft	Avenue of Loveless Hearts	"Sleep Safe Tonight"	Writer
2023	Bernhoft	Avenue of Loveless Hearts	"I Got A Feeling"	Writer
2023	Bernhoft	Avenue of Loveless Hearts	"Let It Go"	Writer
2023	Bernhoft	Avenue of Loveless Hearts	"Love Not War"	Writer
2023	Venbee	zero experience	"mona lisa"	Writer
2023	INJI		"BELLYDANCING"	Writer
2023	Brooke Combe		"Praise"	Writer
2023	UPSAHL	Snowglobe	"Pick Up Where We Left Off"	Writer
2023	Felly		"Beautiful Day"	Writer
2024	Aidan Martin		"Lonely People"	Writer
2024	Frank Walker, Nate Smith		"Missing You"	Writer
2024	Paloma Faith	The Glorification of Sadness	"God in a Dress"	Writer
2024	Paloma Faith	The Glorification of Sadness	"Let it Ride"	Writer
2024	Paloma Faith	The Glorification of Sadness	"Eat Sh*t And Die"	Writer
2024	Sheppard		"Edge of the Earth"	Writer
2024	Lyn Lapid, Whethan		"Cruise Control"	Writer
2024	Vienna Vienna		"Beauty Queen"	Writer
2024	Angrybaby, Alida		"I FOUND LOVE"	Writer
2024	Eric Nam	House on a Hill	"Strawberries"	Writer
2024	Emmit Fenn		"Count On Me"	Writer
2024	Sophie and the Giants		"Shut Up And Dance"	Writer
2024	Christian French		"Someone To Love"	Writer
2024	Vienna Vienna		"F**k Me"	Writer
2024	Vienna Vienna		"Love Me"	Writer
2024	Daktyl, San Holo, Lizzy Land		"Black Water"	Writer
2024	Vienna Vienna		"Best of Me"	Writer
2024	Wakyin, Bantu		"Closer"	Writer
2024	Goodboys, Julia Church		"Fractures"	Writer
2024	TELYKAST, Sam Gray		"Surrender Your Love"	Writer
2024	MEDUZA, HAYLA		"Another World"	Writer
2024	Dotan		"Drown Me in Your River"	Writer
2024	gavn!		"Love Me 'Til You Leave Me"	Writer
2024	Syn Cole, Alida		"Waterfall"	Writer
2024	Nate Smith	California Gold	"Hurtless"	Writer
2024	Wafia		"Say It To The Moon"	Writer
2024	Vienna Vienna	Wonderland	"Sex Drugs Whatever"	Writer
2024	Vienna Vienna	Wonderland	"Wonderland"	Writer
2024	Vienna Vienna	Wonderland	"Make a Man Out of You"	Writer
2024	Vienna Vienna	Wonderland	"One More Last Time"	Writer
2024	Matteo Bocelli, Sofia Carson		"If I Knew"	Writer
2024	Bishop Briggs	Tell My Therapist I'm Fine	"I'm Not A Machine"	Writer
2024	aespa		"Whiplash"	Writer
2024	Tiësto ft. Soaky Siren		"Tantalizing"	Writer
2024	The Score		"Better Days"	Writer
2024	MEDUZA, HAYLA		"Another World (Kevin de Vries & SLVR Remix)"	Writer
2024	Anabel Englund		"Zen Cowboy"	Writer
2024	Letdown.		"decades"	Writer
2025	Zerb, Wiz Khalifa, Ty Dolla $ign		"Location"	Writer
2025	John Summit feat. CLOVES		"Focus"	Writer
2025	Vienna Vienna		"God Save The Queens"	Writer
2025	Jonas Blue, Izzy Bizu		"Lifeline"	Writer
2025	D3lta		"Lonely Together"	Writer
2025	Frankie Grande		"Rhythm of Love"	Writer
2025	Victor Ray		"World At My Feet"	Writer
2025	Massano		"Over The Edge (ft. Kali Claire)"	Writer
2025	Arrested Youth		"Everything I Need"	Writer
2025	Elley Duhé		"Body Talk"	Writer
2025	Jin		"Background"	Writer
2025	Jax Jones, Emei		"Stereo"	Writer
2025	TOMORROW X TOGETHER		"Beautiful Stangers"	Writer
2025	Christopher		"Stubborn Heart"	Writer
2025	Jaxomy, Niklas Dee, Anica Russo		"Dolce Amore"	Writer
2025	Wafia		"Nosebleed"	Writer
2025	Matoma, Taranteeno		"Rain On Me"	Writer
2025	TWICE	Ten: The Story Goes On	"Move Like That" (Momo solo)	Producer
2025	D3lta		"Kids"	Writer
2025	Alexander Stewart	What If?	"Not Ready Yet"	Writer
2025	MIYON	MY, Lover	"You And No One Else"	Writer
2025	MIYON, Colde	MY, Lover	"Reno"	Writer
2025	NEWBEAT	LOUDER THAN EVER	"Look So Good"	Writer, Producer
2025	NEWBEAT	LOUDER THAN EVER	"LOUD"	Writer, Producer
2025	NEWBEAT	LOUDER THAN EVER	"Natural"	Writer, Producer
2025	NEWBEAT	LOUDER THAN EVER	"Unbelievable"	Writer, Producer
2025	Mark Tuan		"AUTOPILOT"	Writer
2025	Joseph Lawrence		"LOVELY BOY"	Writer
2025	&friends, Bipolar Sunshine		"Temptation"	Writer
2025	AJ McLean		"Arizona"	Writer
2026	AJ McLean		"Lovin' On Me"	Writer
2026	Banners		"My Empire"	Writer
2026	JP Cooper ft. Gabrielle		"Sad Song"	Writer
2026	Alesso, Pendulum		"FADE"	Writer
2026	The Warning, Carín León		"Love To Be Loved"	Writer
2026	ILLENIUM, Elley Duhé	ODYSSEY	"Feels Like You"	Writer
2026	Texture		"Nobody"	Writer
2026	Ty Dolla $ign		"good to me"	Writer
2026	Midnight Til Morning		"Math"	Writer
2026	NCT WISH	Ode to Love - The 1st Album	"Crush"	Writer
2026	Matt Sassari, Bas, Drew Love		"Provide For You"	Writer
2026	Elley Duhé		"This Side Of Heaven"	Writer
2026	D3lta		"Daydream"	Writer
2026	Zerb, 24kGoldn		"Fast Friends"	Writer
2026	TAEYONG	WYLD - The 1st Album	"Storm"	Writer
2026	Debbie		"Weight On Me"	Writer
2026	Clean Bandit, Biig Piig		"I Don't Wanna Hurt You"	Writer
2026	EMIN		"Ordinary Love"	Writer
2026	Daniel Allan		"Survive"	Writer
2026	Elley Duhé	Wounded Angel	"Texaco"	Writer
2026	Elley Duhé	Wounded Angel	"Built Different"	Writer
2026	Elley Duhé	Wounded Angel	"Stairways In The Sky"	Writer
2026	Elley Duhé	Wounded Angel	"Bottle And A Bible"	Writer
2026	Elley Duhé	Wounded Angel	"Tangled Heart"	Writer
2026	Elley Duhé	Wounded Angel	"Never Mine"	Writer
2026	Elley Duhé	Wounded Angel	"Can't Break A Broken Heart"	Writer
2026	Elley Duhé	Wounded Angel	"Crossroads of Goodbye"	Writer
2026	Kaskade, Brieanna Grace	ORIGIN //	"Stay For Love"	Writer
2026	Ruel, Sadie Jean		"Another You"	Writer
2026	ARTBAT, 7 SKIES, Sadie Rose Van		"Mi Amor"	Writer
2026	TOMORROW X TOGETHER	PERFECT STORM	"Higher Love"	Writer
