= Train Wreck (James Arthur song) =

- Acoustic version single cover

Song by James Arthur

from the album Back from the Edge
- Released: 28 October 2020
- Length: 3:28
- Songwriters: Adam Argyle; Andrew Jackson; James Arthur
- Producer: Adam Argyle

"Train Wreck" is a song by the British singer James Arthur from his 2016 album Back from the Edge. On 28 October 2020, four years later, an acoustic version was released after the song went viral on the video-sharing platform TikTok, which had led to it entering the top 20 of the UK Singles Chart.

== Charts ==
=== Weekly charts ===
Weekly chart performance for "Train Wreck"
Chart (2020–2021)	Peak position
Australia (ARIA)	45
Belgium (Ultratop 50 Flanders)	45
Belgium (Ultratip Bubbling Under Wallonia)	17
France (SNEP)	136
Germany (GfK)	98
Netherlands (Single Top 100)	40
Norway (VG-lista)	13
Portugal (AFP)	71
Sweden (Sverigetopplistan)	23
Switzerland (Schweizer Hitparade)	69
UK Singles (OCC)	16

=== Year-end charts ===
Year-end chart performance for "Train Wreck"
Chart (2021)	Position
Portugal (AFP)	155

== Certifications ==
Region	Certification	Certified units/sales
Australia (ARIA)	Platinum	70,000^{‡}
Belgium (BRMA)	Gold	20,000^{‡}
Brazil (Pro-Música Brasil)	3× Platinum	180,000^{‡}
Canada (Music Canada)	3× Platinum	240,000^{‡}
Denmark (IFPI Danmark)	Platinum	90,000^{‡}
France (SNEP)	Gold	100,000^{‡}
Germany (BVMI)	Gold	200,000^{‡}
New Zealand (RMNZ)	2× Platinum	60,000^{‡}
Poland (ZPAV)	Gold	25,000^{‡}
Portugal (AFP)	Gold	5,000^{‡}
Spain (PROMUSICAE)	Gold	30,000^{‡}
Switzerland (IFPI Switzerland)	Platinum	30,000^{‡}
United Kingdom (BPI)	Platinum	600,000^{‡}
United States (RIAA)	Platinum	1,000,000^{‡}
Streaming
Sweden (GLF)	Gold	4,000,000^{†}
^{‡} Sales+streaming figures based on certification alone.^{†} Streaming-only figures based on certification alone.
