= Bramble: The Mountain King =

- Developer: Dimfrost Studio
- Publisher: Merge Games
- Directors: Fredrik Selldén; Fredrik Präntare; Ellinor Morén; Mikael Lindhe
- Producers: Fredrik Selldén; Josua Mannebäck; Fredrik Präntare
- Designers: Jonas Petersson; Fredrik Selldén; Mikael Lindhe
- Programmer: Jonathan Lundgren
- Artist: Ellinor Morén
- Writers: Fredrik Selldén; Mikael Lindhe; Josua Mannebäck
- Composers: Martin Wave; Dan Wakefield
- Engine: Unreal Engine
- Platforms: Nintendo Switch; PlayStation 4; PlayStation 5; Windows; Xbox One; Xbox Series X/S
- Release: WW: April 27, 2023
- Genre: Action-adventure
- Mode: Single-player

Bramble: The Mountain King is a 2023 action-adventure video game developed by Dimfrost Studio and published by Merge Games. Players control a young boy named Olle who attempts to rescue his kidnapped sister Lillemor from mythological creatures.

== Gameplay ==
Bramble: The Mountain King is an adventure game based on Scandinavian folklore. It is played from a third-person perspective and has elements of horror games. The player character Olle must traverse locales common to fairy tales. Travel is generally linear, and, to continue, the player must occasionally solve puzzles or jump across platforms, as in platform games. There are also occasional action sequences where the player must engage in boss fights.

== Plot ==
In an old Nordic land, a young boy named Olle plays with his big sister Lillemor at night. The siblings fall into a giant tree, which magically shrinks them, and they spend time with the gnomes and fairies before returning to normal size. However, a troll captures Lillemor to be taken to an unknown kingdom in a remote mountain. With a mysterious stone of light he finds, Olle looks for Lillemor through the woods.

Olle escapes from trolls, and also befriends the stone giant Lemus. He is then entranced into stumbling to a pond by the hypnotic violin melody of Näcken, a sinister water spirit. Olle flees from him in the riverside, and Näcken is killed in his pursuit of Olle when they both go off the edge of a waterfall. Olle meets the young witch Tuva, who gives his stone part of her power to defend himself and push back the Bramble infesting the land. Traveling farther out into the marshes, which are filled with shadowy figures of drowned children, Olle follows a witch who plans to sacrifice her baby in a Satanic ritual, with the child becoming a shadowed one under the watch of the demon midwife Kärrhäxan. Olle ultimately fails to save the newborn from being drowned by the witch, who hangs herself. Olle buries the child to prevent them from becoming another shadow.

In the library of the Lyktgubbe, a magical archivist creature, Olle learns the tale of the Mountain King: King Nihls' son Ulrik was ailing, so he set out on a bloody search for the cure. Finding a kind witch, she gave him a magic flower that she warned to only use a piece of. Although the boy was healed by it, he was then killed by the royal servants out of vengeance towards his father's cruel campaign. The devastated King unleashed his fury with the full flower, transforming into a mad giant and releasing the Bramble onto the world. The witch witnessed the King's rampage from afar and used her power to build a mountain over him and his decimated kingdom, binding him to the Bramble forever; the trolls are forced to retrieve prey for him to feed on.

Olle encounters the shapeshifter Skogsrå, who disguised herself as a beautiful woman to lure men from a nearby village to their deaths, drawing power from their hearts. Olle fights and kills her with the light; he continues to the village destroyed by the upheaval caused by Skogsrå, later afflicted with a plague caused by the demon hag Pesta, which turned the villagers into zombies. Olle uses a rowboat to cross the sea to the mountain, but is confronted by Pesta herself; Olle uses the light to overcome her nightmare and banish her.

Entering the mountain through a magic doorway, Olle finds the Mountain King's sanctum, but is too late as he witnesses Lillemor being fed to the giant. Olle uses the light to weaken the Bramble binding the Mountain King. With the Bramble weakened, King Nihls regains his senses and destroys the rooting flower of the Bramble, decimating the cursed plant. Olle climbs onto King Nihls' beard but falls, managing to throw the stone of light into the King's mouth, who collapses dead. Olle is killed by the fall, and Lillemor uses the light to cut her way out of the King's stomach. The light revives Olle, and Lillemor carries him as the castle begins to crumble; they are saved by the arrival of Lemus. The story ends with Lillemor searching for Olle at their home in the night before he appears to reassure her.

== Development ==
The developer, Dimfrost, is based in Sweden. Dimfrost's first idea had to do with Vikings, but they found the idea overplayed and chose instead to focus on Swedish mythology. The story comes from cautionary fables for children, and the monster design was inspired by John Bauer. The developers did not want players to see the game as just a horror game; besides the grim atmosphere, they also wanted to stress the beautiful elements and Olle's growth as a character. Merge Games released it for Windows, Xbox Series X/S, PlayStation 4 & 5, and Nintendo Switch on April 27, 2023.

== Reception ==
Bramble: The Mountain King received positive reviews on Metacritic. Although PC Gamer highly praised the game's atmosphere and said it had the potential to be an "instant classic", they criticized what they felt was "archaic puzzle design" for ruining the experience. Shacknews called it "as gorgeous as it is horrifying" and recommended it to fans of horror games. Nintendo Life recommended against the Switch version due to performance problems during their review, but they reported that an upcoming patch promised to address this. In the meantime, they recommended playing the game on more powerful systems. GamesRadar said it has enough jump scares and gore to satisfy horror fans, but there is also "a lot of wonder to be found".
