= How You Leave a Man =

2023 single by Paloma Faith

Single by Paloma Faith

from the album The Glorification of Sadness
- Released: 11 October 2023
- Genre: Chamber pop
- Length: 3:34
- Label: Sony; RCA
- Songwriters: Andrew Wells; Charlie Puth; Elle King; Jacob Kasher Hindlin
- Producers: Andrew Wells; Martin Wave

Paloma Faith singles chronology
"Monster" (2021)	"How You Leave a Man" (2023)	"Bad Woman" (2023)

Music video
- "How You Leave a Man" on YouTube

"How You Leave a Man" is a song by British singer-songwriter Paloma Faith. It was released on 11 October 2023 by Sony Music and RCA Records as the lead single from her sixth studio album The Glorification of Sadness. It was produced by Andrew Wells and Martin Wave, and was written by Wells, Charlie Puth, Elle King, and Jacob Kasher Hindlin, and is the only song on the seventeen track album that was not written by Faith. Lyrically, "How You Leave a Man" is about finding the confidence to walk away from a relationship and being empowered with your own happiness.

== Background ==
"How You Leave a Man" is a chamber pop song. Faith described the song as "pretty personal" and expressed her nerves about releasing it and putting her private life out into the public. "How You Leave a Man" was inspired by the separation from her husband of 20 years and the father of her two children. She noted that it is "weird" seeing them sing and dance along to the track "without grasping what it is about". In an interview with the Evening Standard, she stated: "I am excited and nervous, because it is - as you can hear by the title - pretty personal. Especially with two children. [Making music] is always personal, it just so happens that this happens to be probably one of the most life-changing moments of my life. I guess I have no choice. Oh my god. I am nervous, but I am also quite proud of it".

== Music video ==
The video for the single was directed by Theo Adams and filmed in Warsaw. The video depicts Faith as an enigmatic screen siren, cruising through a nocturnal city-scape, in a beautifully lit, cinematic portrayal of empowerment. Of the experience, Adams expressed that "directing Paloma's first video in three years has been an absolute joy. I've known Paloma since I was 16, when we were both performing in back rooms of east London clubs in ludicrous regalia and buckets of fake blood. I want to thank her for putting her trust in me now all these years later and delivering the raw, cathartic, and explosively powerful performance this video needed, just as she did all those years ago. I put Paloma and the entire crew through some Herculean conditions, filming in the rain, thunder, lightning, and freezing temperatures while speeding down Warsaw's city streets in the middle of the night for hours on end, but we all had the best time!"

== Charts ==
"How You Leave a Man" chart performance
Chart (2023)	Peak position
UK Singles Sales (OCC)	33
UK Singles Downloads (OCC)	28
