= James Arthur (album) =

Studio album by James Arthur
- Released: 1 November 2013
- Recorded: 2012–13
- Genres: Pop; R&B; soul
- Length: 44:18
- Labels: Syco; Sony
- Producers: Naughty Boy; Tiago Carvalho; Craze & Hoax; Mike Dean; Jimmy Douglass; Bradford Ellis; Matt Furmidge; Komi Hakan; Ash Howes; Da Internz; Mojam; Salaam Remi; Steve Robson; Gustave Rudman; Shakavelli; Graham Stack; Richard Stannard; TMS

James Arthur chronology
| James Arthur (2013) | Back from the Edge (2016) |

Singles from James Arthur
- 1. "Impossible" Released: 9 December 2012; 2. "You're Nobody 'til Somebody Loves You" Released: 20 October 2013; 3. "Recovery" Released: 15 December 2013; 4. "Get Down" Released: 3 March 2014

James Arthur is the debut studio album by British singer and songwriter James Arthur. It was released on 1 November 2013 by Syco Music. The album includes the singles "Impossible" (Arthur's X Factor winner's single), and "You're Nobody 'til Somebody Loves You", as well as collaborations with Emeli Sandé and Chasing Grace.

The album debuted at number 2 on the UK Albums Chart, kept off the top spot by Eminem's The Marshall Mathers LP 2. It became the 30th best-selling album of the year in the UK, despite iTunes offering refunds for fans after Arthur became embroiled in a homophobia row. As of 16 February 2017, it has sold over 287,000 copies in the UK.

== Background ==
On 9 December 2012, Arthur won the ninth series of the ITV music competition series The X Factor. As the winner, he was signed to Simon Cowell's record label Syco Music and released a "cover of Shontelle's 2010 single "Impossible", which debuted at number one on the UK Singles Chart.

On 3 March 2013, Arthur announced via Twitter that would be starting work on his debut album the following morning, stating "Can't wait to get in the studio tomorrow!!". Several tracks on the album feature co-writing and production from Naughty Boy, and collaborations with Emeli Sandé and Chasing Grace, on the tracks "Roses" and "Certain Things" respectively. Naughty Boy said of the album; "It's really cool actually, it's definitely poppy but with an edge and a bit urban. One of the songs that me and Emeli wrote [for him] is like a big orchestral piece and it has no drums. It's a real album, I think a lot of people are going to be surprised with his album."

== Promotion ==
Arthur performed "You're Nobody 'til Somebody Loves You" on The Jonathan Ross Show on 12 October, the Australian version of The X Factor on 14 October, Friday Download on 1 November and Daybreak on 4 November. He also performed at the BBC Radio 1 Teen Awards and switch on the Christmas lights in London's Oxford Street and in Manchester, with performances in both places as well.

On 11 October, a free download of an acoustic version of "New Tattoo" was available to download on the Amazon MP3 to celebrate the release of the album.

Arthur performed his third single "Recovery" on The X Factor on 1 December 2013. It then debuted at 19 on the UK Singles Chart on 8 December 2013.

== Singles ==
- "Impossible", Arthur's X Factor winner's single, is included as the fourth track on the album. It was released on 9 December 2012. It became the fastest-selling X Factor winner's single so far, reaching 255,000 downloads within 48 hours and over 490,000 by the end of the week. The single topped the UK Singles Chart in its first week of release and also peaked at number one in Ireland, Greece and the Czech Republic, number two in Australia, New Zealand and Switzerland, and number three in Belgium.
- "You're Nobody 'til Somebody Loves You" was released as the album's official lead single on 20 October 2013. It premiered on UK radio stations on 19 September 2013. The song was initially set for release in July, but was delayed due a throat infection that Arthur was suffering from. The music video premiered on 30 September 2013. It reached number two in the UK, beaten to the top spot by Lorde's "Royals".
- "Recovery" was released as the third single on 15 December 2013. It was written by James Arthur, Ina Wroldsen and Tiago Carvalho. It debuted at 19 on the UK Singles Chart on 8 December 2013.
- "Get Down" was released as the fourth single off of the album in March 2014 in the UK.

== Critical response ==
Professional ratings
Aggregate scores
| Source | Rating |
|---|---|
| Metacritic | 58/100 |
Review scores
| Source | Rating |
| Daily Record | 3/5 stars |
| Digital Spy | 4/5 stars |
| The Guardian | 2/5 stars |
| The Independent | 2/5 stars |
| London Evening Standard | 2/5 stars |
| Metro | 2/5 stars |
| musicOMH | 3/5 stars |
| Shields Gazette | 4/10 stars |
| The Times | 2/5 stars |
| Virgin Media | 3/5 stars |

The album received mixed reviews from critics. On Metacritic, it holds an average score of 58 based on ten reviews, indicating "mixed or average reviews". Lewis Corner of Digital Spy gave it 4/5 stars, saying that Arthur has "The angst of Plan B and defiance of Emeli Sandé". Writing for EntertainmentWise, Natalie Palmer wrote, "A mix of soul, rock and a splash of rap to make for an amazing debut...With X Factor's input it's hard not to be worried that even the best acts will come out with completely over-produced manufactured rubbish. However, a year later James Arthur is back with his self-titled debut album and we can assure you it won't disappoint."

Andy Gill of The Independent, however, was more negative. He gave the album two stars and said, "The opener, "You're Nobody 'Til Somebody Loves You", is a decent showcase for his burly-voiced brand of R&B pop – but elsewhere, Arthur grossly overdoes the emotional groaning that passes for vocal expression in the album's more overwrought corners." In his review for the Metro, John Lewis stated that "the good moments are overwhelmed by the stench of focus-grouped blandness." and awarded the album two stars. In an extremely negative review, Sylvie Levished of Evigshed mag gave the album 1/5 and wrote "All in All, not really sure if James Arthur's behavior is the best way to promote his music specially when he is just a beginner in the music industry. His album is nothing special. Very different from factor winners, the young songwriter/singer shines until now, with his narcissism, his pride, an extreme disrespectful for his label mates and other young artists, coupled with a big arrogance in media and through his twitter account. If he put as much energy into his music, it would certainly be better. It is cold, without emotion. Not recommended."

== Track listing ==
James Arthur – Standard edition
| No. | Title | Writer(s) | Producer(s) | Length |
|---|---|---|---|---|
| 1. | "You're Nobody 'til Somebody Loves You" | James Arthur; Tom Barnes; William Bell; Booker T. Jones; Pete Kelleher; Ben Kohn | TMS | 3:21 |
| 2. | "Get Down" | Mustapha Omer; James Murray; Jonny Coffer; Wayne Hector; Arthur; Ronald Bell; Robert Bell; George Brown; Roy Handy; Cleveland Horne; Robert Mickens; Gene C. Redd; Claydes Smith; Dennis Thomas; Richard Westfield | Mojam; Craze & Hoax^{[a]} | 3:46 |
| 3. | "New Tattoo" | Salaam Remi; Arthur | Remi | 3:31 |
| 4. | "Impossible" | Arnthor Birgisson; Ina Wroldsen | Graham Stack; Matt Furmidge | 3:29 |
| 5. | "Lie Down" | Richard Stannard; Ash Howes; Arthur; Bradford Ellis; J.J. Johnson | Stannard; Howes; Ellis | 2:53 |
| 6. | "Recovery" | Tiago Carvalho; Wroldsen; Arthur | Tiago Carvalho; TMS^{[b]} | 4:37 |
| 7. | "Roses" (with Emeli Sandé) | Shahid Khan; Emeli Sandé; Arthur; Gustave Rudman; Ben Harrison | Naughty Boy; Gustave Rudman^{[b]} | 4:14 |
| 8. | "Supposed" | Khan; Hector; Arthur | Naughty Boy | 3:50 |
| 9. | "Suicide" | Arthur; Marcos Palacios; Ernest Clark; Sean "Elijah Blake" Fenton; David Asante; Eric Jackson | Da Internz; Jimmy Douglass^{[a]} | 4:11 |
| 10. | "Is This Love?" | Steve Robson; Claude Kelly; Arthur | Robson; Komi Hakan^{[a]} | 3:07 |
| 11. | "Certain Things" (featuring Chasing Grace) | Shahid Khan; Phil Plested; Arthur; Grace Ackerman | Naughty Boy | 3:53 |
| 12. | "Smoke Clouds" | Arthur | | 3:57 |
| 13. | "Flyin'" | Khan; Shakil Ashraf; Arthur | Naughty Boy; Shakavelli | 1:19 |
| Total length: | | | | 46:14 |

James Arthur – Deluxe edition bonus tracks
| No. | Title | Writer(s) | Producer(s) | Length |
|---|---|---|---|---|
| 14. | "Emergency" | Arthur; Mike Dean | Mike Dean | 4:07 |
| 15. | "You're Nobody 'til Somebody Loves You" (Acoustic) | Arthur; Barnes; Bell; Kohn; Jones; Kelleher | | 3:11 |
| 16. | "Impossible" (Acoustic) | Birgisson; Wroldsen | | 4:10 |
| 17. | "Get Down" (Acoustic) | Arthur; Omer; Murray; Coffer; Hector; Bell; Bell | | 4:10 |
| 18. | "Supposed" (Acoustic) | Arthur; Khan; Hector | | 3:11 |
| Total length: | | | | 65:03 |

James Arthur – iTunes deluxe edition bonus video
| No. | Title | Length |
|---|---|---|
| 19. | "You're Nobody 'til Somebody Loves You" | 3:29 |
| Total length: | | 68:32 |

Notes

- ^{^[a]} signifies an additional producer.
- ^{^[b]} signifies a co-producer.

Sample credits

- "You're Nobody 'til Somebody Loves You" features samples from the recording "I Love Lucy" performed by Albert King.
- "Get Down" features samples from the recording "N.T (Part 1)" performed by Kool & The Gang.
- "Lie Down" contains elements of "Pull, Jabul, Pull", written by J.J. Johnson. Sample recreation produced by Hal Ritson and Richard Adlam.

== Credits and personnel ==
(Credits taken from AllMusic and James Arthur's liner notes.)

- Grace Ackerman – composer, vocals
- Richard Adlam – drums, producer, programming
- Graham Archer – vocal engineer
- James Arthur – composer, guitar, primary artist, vocals, vocals (background)
- Shakil Ashraf – composer
- Tom Barnes – composer, drums, instrumentation
- Xavier Barnet – chorus
- Robert Bell – composer
- Ronald Bell – composer
- William Bell – composer
- Biffco – producer
- Dan Bingham – percussion, wurlitzer
- Arnthor Birgisson – composer
- Tim Blacksmith – management
- Riki Bleau – management
- Delbert Bowers – assistant
- George Brown – composer
- Tiago Carvalho – composer, instrumentation, producer
- Lurine Cato – chorus, vocals (background)
- Austen Jux Chandler – engineer
- Jo Changer – assistant contractor
- Chasing Grace – featured artist
- Ernest Clark – composer
- Simon Clarke – arranger, sax (alto), sax (baritone)
- Wez Clarke – mix down
- Jonny Coffer – composer, piano, strings
- Ben Collier – programming, string arrangements
- Roz Colls – string contractor
- Rupert Coulson – engineer
- Tom Coyne – mastering
- Craze – additional production
- Fiona Cruickshank – assistant
- Da Internz – producer
- Danny D. – management
- Gleyder "Gee" Disla – engineer
- Jimmy Douglass – additional production, mixing
- Bradford Ellis – composer, instrumentation, producer, programming
- Joy Farrukh – chorus
- Sean "Elijah Blake" Fenton – composer
- Ben Foster – conductor, orchestration
- Matt Furmidge – producer
- Chris Galland – assistant
- Serban Ghenea – mixing
- Cameron Gower-Poole – assistant engineer
- Isobel Griffiths – contractor
- Komi & JL – additional production, programming
- Roy Handy – composer
- John Hanes – engineer
- Ben Harrison – composer, guitar
- Wayne Hector – composer
- David Asante – composer
- Richard Henry – trombone
- Ben Hewlett – harmonica
- HOAX – additional production
- Cleveland Horne – composer
- Ash Howes – composer, instrumentation, mixing, producer, programming
- Eric Jackson – composer
- Jaycen Joshua – mixing
- J.J. Johnson – composer
- Booker T. Jones – composer
- Priscilla Jones – choir arrangement, vocals (background)
- Ryan Kaul – assistant
- Pete Kelleher – composer, instrumentation, keyboards
- Claude Kelly – composer, vocal producer
- The Kick Horns – horn
- Ben Kohn – bass, composer, instrumentation
- Dave Liddell – trombone
- Dom Liu – assistant engineer
- Manny Marroquin – mixing
- Cliff Masterson – choir arrangement, conductor, string arrangements
- Paul Meehan – programming
- Robert "Spike" Mickens – composer
- Mike Moore – guitar
- James Murray – composer, engineer, instrumentation, vocals
- Naughty Boy – composer, engineer, instrumentation, producer
- Everton Nelson – orchestra leader
- Zach Nicholls – engineer
- Gary Noble – mixing
- Mustafa Omer – engineer, instrumentation, vocals
- Mustapha Omer – composer
- Marcos Palacios – composer
- Mark Pellizzer – guitar
- Adam Phillips – guitar
- Phil Plested – composer, guitar
- Ryan Quigley – trumpet
- Gene Redd – composer
- Salaam Remi – arranger, bass, composer, drums, keyboards, producer
- James Reynolds – mixing
- Hal Ritson – keyboards, producer
- Steve Robson – composer, guitar, keyboards, producer, vocal producer
- Gene C. Rodd – composer
- Gustave Rudman – arranger, instrumentation, orchestration, producer
- Emeli Sandé – composer, primary artist, vocals
- Tim Sanders – arranger, sax (tenor)
- Tim Sandiford – bass, guitar
- Claydes Smith – composer
- Jonny Solway – assistant
- Steve Stacey – design
- Graham Stack – producer
- Richard "Biff" Stannard – producer
- Richard Stannard – composer, instrumentation, programming
- Sunny – engineer
- Dennis Thomas – composer
- TMS – producer
- Tom Upex – assistant
- The Wade Brothers – photography
- Richard Westfield – composer
- Ina Wroldsen – composer, vocals (background)

== Charts and certifications ==
=== Weekly charts ===
| Chart (2013) | Peak position |
|---|---|
| Australian Albums (ARIA) | 14 |
| Austrian Albums (Ö3 Austria) | 22 |
| Belgian Albums (Ultratop Flanders) | 74 |
| Belgian Albums (Ultratop Wallonia) | 55 |
| Dutch Albums (Album Top 100) | 99 |
| French Albums (SNEP) | 21 |
| German Albums (Offizielle Top 100) | 25 |
| Greek Albums (IFPI) | 3 |
| Hungarian Albums (MAHASZ) | 9 |
| Irish Albums (IRMA) | 2 |
| New Zealand Albums (RMNZ) | 11 |
| Polish Albums (ZPAV) | 11 |
| Scottish Albums (Official Charts) | 2 |
| Spanish Albums (Promusicae) | 34 |
| Swiss Albums (Schweizer Hitparade) | 6 |
| UK Albums (Official Charts) | 2 |

=== Year-end charts ===
| Chart (2013) | Position |
|---|---|
| French Albums (SNEP) | 184 |
| UK Albums (OCC) | 30 |
| Chart (2014) | Position |
| Swiss Albums (Schweizer Hitparade) | 93 |

=== Certifications ===
| Region | Certification | Certified units/sales |
|---|---|---|
| Brazil (Pro-Música Brasil) | Gold | 20,000^{‡} |
| Denmark (IFPI Danmark) | Gold | 10,000^{‡} |
| Ireland (IRMA) | Gold | 7,500^{^} |
| Poland (ZPAV) | 2× Platinum | 40,000^{‡} |
| United Kingdom (BPI) | Platinum | 300,000^{‡} |
^{^} Shipments figures based on certification alone.^{‡} Sales+streaming figures based on certification alone.

== Release history ==
| Region | Date | Label | Format |
|---|---|---|---|
| Austria | 1 November 2013 | Syco | Standard; deluxe |
| Belgium | 1 November 2013 | Syco | Standard; deluxe |
| Canada | 1 November 2013 | Syco | Standard; deluxe |
| Finland | 1 November 2013 | Syco | Standard; deluxe |
| Germany | 1 November 2013 | Syco | Standard; deluxe |
| Ireland | 1 November 2013 | Syco | Standard; deluxe |
| Netherlands | 1 November 2013 | Syco | Standard; deluxe |
| Sweden | 1 November 2013 | Syco | Standard; deluxe |
| Bulgaria | 4 November 2013 | Syco | Standard; deluxe |
| Denmark | 4 November 2013 | Syco | Standard; deluxe |
| France | 4 November 2013 | Syco | Standard; deluxe |
| Greece | 4 November 2013 | Syco | Standard; deluxe |
| Norway | 4 November 2013 | Syco | Standard; deluxe |
| United Kingdom | 4 November 2013 | Syco | Standard; deluxe |
| Argentina | 5 November 2013 | Syco | Standard; deluxe |
| Armenia | 5 November 2013 | Syco | Standard; deluxe |
| Brazil | 5 November 2013 | Syco | Standard; deluxe |
| Chile | 5 November 2013 | Syco | Standard; deluxe |
| Mexico | 5 November 2013 | Syco | Standard; deluxe |
| Ukraine | 5 November 2013 | Syco | Standard; deluxe |
| Venezuela | 5 November 2013 | Syco | Standard; deluxe |
| Australia | 8 November 2013 | Syco | Standard; deluxe |
| New Zealand | 8 November 2013 | Syco | Standard; deluxe |
