= Bad Woman =

2023 single by Paloma Faith

Single by Paloma Faith

from the album The Glorification of Sadness
- Released: 24 November 2023
- Length: 2:44
- Label: Sony; RCA
- Songwriters: Paloma Faith; Fred Cox; Holly Lapsley Fletcher
- Producers: Fred Cox; Martin Wave

Paloma Faith singles chronology
"How You Leave a Man" (2023)	"Bad Woman" (2023)	"Pressure" (2024)

Visualiser
- "Bad Woman" on YouTube

"Bad Woman" is a song by British singer-songwriter Paloma Faith. It was released on 24 November 2023 by Sony Music and RCA Records as the second single from her sixth studio album The Glorification of Sadness (2023). It was written by Faith, Fred Cox, and Låpsley, and produced by Cox, Martin Wave, and vocal producer Jamie McEvoy.

== Background and release ==
Following the release of "How You Leave a Man", Faith revealed "Bad Woman", a track that places female empowerment at its core. Faith addresses the societal pressures women face, highlighting the struggle to meet expectations and the risk of being labeled as "incompetent" or a "bad woman" for failing to conform. She hopes this song encourages women to embrace their true selves, feel comfortable in their own skin, and recognize that imperfection is a natural part of being human. Described by Faith as a personal standout from the record, the song is an anthemic, choir-backed pop track introduced as a message of empowerment for women.

=== Inspiration ===
In an interview, Faith explained that the inspiration behind "Bad Woman" was shaped by her personal experiences following the end of a long-term relationship. She reflected on the guilt and feelings of failure she faced, and how societal expectations often define what it means to be a "good woman". Faith noted the double standards applied to men and women in leadership and public life, observing that men are often forgiven for mistakes while women face harsher judgment. She also commented on how reactions to her work, including promotional content on social media, sometimes highlight these contradictions, with criticism more frequently coming from women themselves.

== Charts ==
"Bad Woman" chart performance
Chart (2023)	Peak position
UK Sales Chart (OCC)	50
UK Downloads Chart (OCC)	42
