= Back from the Edge =

Second studio album by British singer and songwriter James Arthur

Studio album by James Arthur
- Released: 28 October 2016
- Genres: Pop; folk; R&B; rock
- Length: 47:44
- Label: Columbia

James Arthur chronology
James Arthur (2013)	Back from the Edge (2016)	You (2019)

Singles from Back from the Edge
- 1. "Say You Won't Let Go" Released: 9 September 2016; 2. "Safe Inside" Released: 10 February 2017; 3. "Can I Be Him" Released: 15 April 2017

Back from the Edge is the second studio album by British singer and songwriter James Arthur. It was released on 28 October 2016 by Columbia Records. The album reached number one on the UK Albums Chart and was certified platinum—denoting 300,000 sales—the following year, in September 2017. It includes the multi-platinum number-one single "Say You Won't Let Go".

== Background ==
Following his self-titled debut studio album being released on 1 November 2013, peaking to number 2 on the UK Albums Chart, on 5 April 2014, several media outlets began to report that Arthur had been dropped from Syco, following a dispute regarding a song entitled, "Follow the Leader". He took to Twitter to deny the claims, however on 11 June 2014, Arthur announced via Twitter that he and Syco had parted ways by mutual agreement. During the summer of 2014, Arthur stated that he was working on his second album and was close to signing a new record deal. On 6 September 2015, he announced that he had signed with Columbia Records and that a new album was on the way.

== Singles ==
On 9 September 2016, he released "Say You Won't Let Go" as the official lead single from the album. The single peaked at the top of the UK Singles Chart, a position it maintained for three weeks. Outside the United Kingdom, the single has topped the charts in Australia, New Zealand, Sweden, Singapore, Indonesia and the Republic of Ireland. The music video was released in the same month and was directed by Felix Urbauer.

On 10 February 2017, "Safe Inside" was released as the album's second single. The music video was released slightly before on 25 December 2016 and was directed by Frank Hoffman. Arthur performed the song at the 2017 National Television Awards.

Four years later, the album track "Train Wreck" entered the top 20 on the UK Singles Chart after becoming popular in videos on the video app TikTok.

=== Promotional singles ===
On 8 January 2016, Arthur released a new song called "The Truth" on iTunes in the United States. Following the song's release, he took to Twitter and clarified that the song would feature on Family Therapy with Dr. Jenn, and that it was not the lead single, only a promotional single. On 21 October, a duet version of "Let Me Love the Lonely" was released as a promotional single only in Poland, featuring Polish singer Marina. The song was certified double Platinum in the country.

== Critical reception ==
Professional ratings
Review scores
Source	Rating
AllMusic	3/5 stars
Auspop	4/5 stars
Blasting News	4/5 stars
Digital Spy	4/5 stars
The Up Coming	3/5 stars

Digital Spy gave the album 4 out of 5 stars, labeling it "the anti-X Factor album" and further stating that "This is the winner we all wanted".

== Commercial performance ==
Back from the Edge debuted at number one on the UK Albums Chart, selling 40,906 copies during its first week of release. The album was certified platinum in September 2017 by the British Phonographic Industry, denoting sales of 300,000 in the UK.

== Track listing ==
Back from the Edge – Standard edition
No.	Title	Writer(s)	Producer(s)	Length
1.	"Back from the Edge"	James Arthur; Jonathan Quarmby; Emma Rohan	Alex Beitzke; Quarmby; Bradley Spence	3:53
2.	"Say You Won't Let Go"	Arthur; Steve Solomon; Neil Ormandy	Beitzke; Spence	3:31
3.	"Prisoner"	Arthur; Quarmby; Rohan	Beitzke; Spence	3:58
4.	"Can I Be Him"	Arthur; George Tizzard; Rick Parkhouse; Negin Djafari	Red Triangle	4:06
5.	"I Am"	Arthur; Adam Argyle; Andrew Jackson	Argyle	3:11
6.	"Train Wreck"	Arthur; Argyle; Jackson	Argyle	3:28
7.	"Safe Inside"	Arthur; Quarmby; Rohan	Beitzke; Spence	3:42
8.	"Sober"	Arthur; Pete "Boxsta" Martin; Steve McEwan	Martin	3:06
9.	"Phoenix"	Arthur; Tizzard; Parkhouse	Red Triangle	4:06
10.	"Let Me Love the Lonely"	Arthur; Argyle; Jackson	Argyle	2:52
11.	"Sermon" (featuring Shotty Horroh)	Arthur; Dave Gibson; Jean-Yves "Jeeve" Ducornet	Jeeve; Beitzke; Spence	4:32
12.	"Remember Who I Was"	Arthur	Beitzke; Spence	2:58
13.	"Finally"	Arthur	Beitzke; Spence; Argyle	4:21

Back from the Edge – Deluxe edition (bonus tracks)
No.	Title	Writer(s)	Producer(s)	Length
14.	"The Truth"	Arthur; Tizzard; Parkhouse	Red Triangle	4:20
15.	"Skeletons"	Arthur; Tizzard; Parkhouse	Red Triangle	3:57
16.	"If Only"	Arthur; Martin; McEwan	Martin	4:03
17.	"Coming Home for Summer"	Arthur; Quarmby; Rohan	Beitzke; Spence	3:49

Back from the Edge – Polish bonus track
No.	Title	Writer(s)	Producer(s)	Length
14.	"Let Me Love the Lonely" (featuring MaRina)	Arthur; Argyle; Jackson	Argyle	2:49

Back from the Edge – 5th Anniversary Vinyl release
No.	Title	Writer(s)	Producer(s)	Length
14.	"Train Wreck (Acoustic)"	Arthur; Argyle; Jackson	Argyle

== Charts ==
=== Weekly charts ===
Chart (2016–2021)	Peak position
Australian Albums (ARIA)	8
Austrian Albums (Ö3 Austria)	38
Belgian Albums (Ultratop Flanders)	19
Belgian Albums (Ultratop Wallonia)	50
Canadian Albums (Billboard)	13
Danish Albums (Hitlisten)	13
Dutch Albums (Album Top 100)	44
Finnish Albums (Suomen virallinen lista)	48
French Albums (SNEP)	53
German Albums (Offizielle Top 100)	38
Hungarian Albums (MAHASZ)	40
Irish Albums (IRMA)	2
Latvian Albums (LaIPA)	84
New Zealand Albums (RMNZ)	17
Norwegian Albums (VG-lista)	12
Polish Albums (ZPAV)	14
Portuguese Albums (AFP)	30
Scottish Albums (Official Charts)	3
Swedish Albums (Sverigetopplistan)	9
Swiss Albums (Schweizer Hitparade)	7
UK Albums (Official Charts)	1
US Billboard 200	39
US Heatseekers Albums (Billboard)	8

=== Year-end charts ===
Chart (2016)	Position
UK Albums (OCC)	30
Chart (2017)	Position
Canadian Albums (Billboard)	37
Danish Albums (Hitlisten)	45
Swedish Albums (Sverigetopplistan)	61
UK Albums (OCC)	43
US Billboard 200	66
Chart (2020)	Position
Danish Albums (Hitlisten)	100
Swedish Albums (Sverigetopplistan)	81
Chart (2021)	Position
Danish Albums (Hitlisten)	60
Dutch Albums (Album Top 100)	94
Norwegian Albums (VG-lista)	40
Swedish Albums (Sverigetopplistan)	44

== Certifications ==
Region	Certification	Certified units/sales
Brazil (Pro-Música Brasil)	2× Platinum	80,000^{‡}
Canada (Music Canada)	2× Platinum	160,000^{‡}
Denmark (IFPI Danmark)	3× Platinum	60,000^{‡}
France (SNEP)	Gold	50,000^{‡}
Italy (FIMI)	Gold	25,000^{‡}
Mexico (AMPROFON)	Gold	30,000^{‡}
New Zealand (RMNZ)	3× Platinum	45,000^{‡}
Poland (ZPAV)	Platinum	20,000^{‡}
Singapore (RIAS)	Platinum	10,000^{*}
Sweden (GLF)	Gold	20,000^{‡}
United Kingdom (BPI)	Platinum	300,000
^{*} Sales figures based on certification alone.^{‡} Sales+streaming figures based on certification alone.

== Release history ==
Region	Release date	Format	Label
Various	28 October 2016	CD; digital download	Columbia
Various	26 November 2021	Vinyl	Columbia
