= Can I Be Him =

Single by James Arthur

from the album Back from the Edge
- Released: 15 April 2017
- Recorded: 2015
- Length: 4:06
- Label: Columbia
- Songwriters: James Arthur; George Tizzard; Rick Parkhouse; Negin Djafari
- Producer: Red Triangle

James Arthur singles chronology
"Safe Inside" (2017)	"Can I Be Him" (2017)	"Go for Broke" (2017)

"Can I Be Him" is a song performed by British singer and songwriter James Arthur. The song was released as a digital download on 15 April 2017 in the United Kingdom by Columbia Records as the third single from his second studio album, Back from the Edge (2016). The song became a moderate hit on a number of charts. As of 2021, it had sold 652,698 copies in the UK.

== Music video ==
On 8 May 2017, Vevo released the music video "Can I Be Him" on YouTube. It shows James Arthur performing the song in a moving subway carriage. He also seems to have some distant eye contact with two girls. The interior subway shots were mainly made in a DT3 unit servicing the U3 line of the Nuremberg U-Bahn, Germany.

== Track listing ==
Digital download
No.	Title	Length
1.	"Can I Be Him"	4:06

Digital download
No.	Title	Length
1.	"Can I Be Him" (SJUR Remix)	3:45

== Charts ==
Chart (2016–2017)	Peak position
Belgium (Ultratop 50 Wallonia)	46
Czech Republic Singles Digital (ČNS IFPI)	97
Ireland (IRMA)	76
Portugal (AFP)	99
Scottish Singles Sales (Official Charts)	31
Sweden (Sverigetopplistan)	72
UK Singles (Official Charts)	69
US Adult Pop Airplay (Billboard)	24

== Certifications ==
Region	Certification	Certified units/sales
Brazil (Pro-Música Brasil)	3× Platinum	180,000^{‡}
Canada (Music Canada)	2× Platinum	160,000^{‡}
Denmark (IFPI Danmark)	Platinum	90,000^{‡}
France (SNEP)	Gold	100,000^{‡}
Italy (FIMI)	Gold	25,000^{‡}
New Zealand (RMNZ)	2× Platinum	60,000^{‡}
Poland (ZPAV)	Gold	25,000^{‡}
Spain (Promusicae)	Gold	30,000^{‡}
United Kingdom (BPI)	2× Platinum	1,200,000^{‡}
^{‡} Sales+streaming figures based on certification alone.

== Release history ==
Region	Date	Format	Label	Ref.
United Kingdom	15 April 2017	Digital download	Columbia	
United States	26 June 2017	Adult contemporary radio	Columbia	
