= Get Down (James Arthur song) =

Single by James Arthur

from the album James Arthur
- Released: 3 March 2014
- Recorded: 2013
- Genre: Pop
- Length: 3:46
- Label: Syco
- Songwriters: James Arthur; Mustapha Omer; James Murray; Jonny Coffer; Wayne Hector; Ronald Bell; Robert Bell
- Producer: MOJAM

James Arthur singles chronology
"Recovery" (2013)	"Get Down" (2014)	"Kryptonite" (2014)

"Get Down" is a song recorded by British singer and songwriter James Arthur. It was released on 3 March 2014 as the fourth and final single from his self-titled 2013 debut studio album, James Arthur.

== Background ==
On 14 January 2014, Arthur confirmed on Twitter that "Get Down" would be the fourth single to be released from his debut album. The track premiered online on 20 January 2014.

Prior to the release of "Get Down", Arthur had generated much controversy in November 2013, over the use of homophobic lyrics in a song. Micky Worthless, a Croydon battle rapper, had issued "Stay in Your Lane", a track mocking Arthur, because Worthless did not feel it was right that Arthur was presenting himself as a battle rapper on national radio. Arthur had responded to Worthless with his vitriolic diss track "Hey Mickey" issuing string of slurs directed at Worthless, rapping "Hilarious, precarious you Talibani confused, imbellic mimic of a gimmick" adding the homophobic slur "You fucking queer". This sparked outrage among the LGBT community and led to Twitter spats with comedians Frankie Boyle and Matt Lucas, and singer Lucy Spraggan. Arthur immediately apologised for his comments and claimed that he was not homophobic. Following this, he announced that he would not be posting on Twitter anymore, with his management taking up control of his page. The backlash continued, however, with a Facebook campaign to see his upcoming appearance on The X Factor be cancelled.

Many radio stations were reluctant to play the song "Get Down" due to controversy over Arthur. Several stations even blacklisted the song. This led to very weak sales for the single "Get Down".

In defense of Arthur, an online petition was launched on the website Change.org in a bid to get Arthur some airplay. The petition stated that Arthur is "a talented singer who needs to be heard" and urged BBC Radio 1 to play "Get Down". The petition was signed by over 830 people. The single only made it to number 96 on the UK Singles Chart.

iTunes offered refunds for Arthur's debut album James Arthur due to complaints from customers.

Arthur performed it live in an acoustic session and published it on 5 November 2013 in his own YouTube channel titled "Get Down (Acoustic)". He also performed it live in a duo with contestant Shem Thomas during The Voice of Switzerland in 2014. Arthur has included the song in his later concerts despite the single not making much impact when released.

== Music video ==
The audio track was uploaded to YouTube on 20 January 2014. The official music video premiered on 3 March 2014, the same day as the single's release.

== Track listing ==
- CD single
1. "Get Down" – 3:46
2. "Get Down" (Live) – 5:47
- Digital remixes EP
1. "Get Down" (Live) – 5:47
2. "Get Down" (Smooth Remix) – 4:58
3. "Get Down" (D-Wayne Remix) – 6:45
4. "Get Down" (Taiki & Nulight Remix) – 5:05
5. "Get Down" (Sharoque Remix) – 3:54

== Charts ==
Chart performance for "Get Down"
Chart (2013–2014)	Peak position
Scotland Singles (OCC)	95
Switzerland (Schweizer Hitparade)	28
UK Singles (OCC)	96

== Release history ==
Release history and formats for "Get Down"
Region	Date	Format	Label
United Kingdom	3 March 2014	Digital download	Syco
Germany	7 March 2014	Digital download	Syco
Italy	7 March 2014	Digital download	Syco
Spain	7 March 2014	Digital download	Syco
France	10 March 2014	Digital download	Syco
Germany	4 April 2014	CD single	RCA
