= Safe Inside =

Single by James Arthur

from the album Back from the Edge
- Released: 10 February 2017
- Recorded: 2016
- Genre: Pop; R&B
- Length: 3:43
- Label: Columbia
- Songwriter(s): James Arthur; Jonathan Quarmby; Emma Rohan
- Producer(s): Alex Beitzke; Jonathan Quarmby; Bradley Spence

James Arthur singles chronology
"Say You Won't Let Go" (2016)	"Safe Inside" (2017)	"Can I Be Him" (2017)

Music video
- "Safe Inside" on YouTube

"Safe Inside" is a song by British singer and songwriter James Arthur. The song was released as a digital download on 10 February 2017 in the United Kingdom by Columbia Records as the second single from his second studio album Back from the Edge (2016).

== Commercial performance ==
On 3 February 2017, it rose from number 103 to 31 on the UK charts due to streaming and airplay, giving Arthur his fifth top 40 entry on the UK Singles Chart.

== Music video ==
A music video to accompany the release of "Safe Inside" was first released onto YouTube on Christmas Day 2016 at a total length of three minutes and forty three seconds.

== Track listing ==
Digital download
No.	Title	Length
1.	"Safe Inside"	3:43

== Charts ==
Chart (2017)	Peak position
Belgium (Ultratip Bubbling Under Flanders)	17
Ireland (IRMA)	54
Portugal (AFP)	85
Scotland (OCC)	20
UK Singles (OCC)	31

== Certifications ==
Region	Certification	Certified units/sales
Brazil (Pro-Música Brasil)	Gold	30,000^{‡}
Canada (Music Canada)	Gold	40,000^{‡}
New Zealand (RMNZ)	Gold	15,000^{‡}
United Kingdom (BPI)	Platinum	600,000^{‡}
^{‡} Sales+streaming figures based on certification alone.

== Release history ==
Region	Date	Format	Label
United Kingdom	10 February 2017	Digital download	Columbia
