= Recovery (James Arthur song) =

Single by James Arthur

from the album James Arthur
- Released: 9 December 2013
- Recorded: 2013
- Genre: Pop
- Length: 4:37
- Label: Syco
- Songwriters: Ina Wroldsen; James Arthur; Tiago Carvalho
- Producers: Tiago Carvalho; TMS

James Arthur singles chronology
"You're Nobody 'til Somebody Loves You" (2013)	"Recovery" (2013)	"Get Down" (2014)

Music video
- "Recovery" on YouTube

"Recovery" is a song recorded by British singer and songwriter James Arthur. It was released by Syco Music on 9 December 2013 as the third single from his debut studio album James Arthur (2013). The song peaked at number 19 on the UK Singles Chart and number 40 on the Irish Singles Chart.

== Live performances ==
Arthur performed the song on the eighth live results show on the tenth series of The X Factor on 8 December 2013. After he performed the song he gave an on-air apology for his recent behaviour after using a homophobic slur in a freestyle track he recorded the previous month. He swiftly apologised to those he offended, but was later involved in a heated argument with Lucy Spraggan over his remarks. Speaking to Dermot O'Leary on the show, he said: "It's been an amazing year for me. There's been incredible highs paired with some terrible lows. I've made a few very silly mistakes. I just want to thank all the people who are still supporting me and especially The X Factor for giving me the opportunity to do my dream job. Above all, I'd like to say sorry for abusing my position as an X Factor winner, because I owe everything to this thing."

== Music video ==
A music video to accompany the release of "Recovery" was first released onto YouTube on 19 December 2013 at a total length of four minutes and three seconds. The video was directed by Emil Nava and sees James Arthur performing the track in an empty studio.

== Track listing ==
Digital download
No.	Title	Length
1.	"Recovery" (Single Version)	3:57
2.	"Recovery" (Acoustic)	4:07
3.	"Recovery" (Drumsound & Bassline Smith Remix)	4:02
4.	"Recovery" (Tim Mason Remix)	5:50

== Chart performance ==
On 4 December 2013, the song was at number 12 on The Official Chart Update. On 8 December 2013, the song entered the UK Singles Chart at number 19 in its first week of release. It has also peaked to number 20 on the Scottish Singles Charts and number 40 on the Irish Singles Chart.

== Charts ==
Chart (2013–14)	Peak position
Belgium (Ultratip Bubbling Under Flanders)	11
Belgium (Ultratip Bubbling Under Wallonia)	9
Czech Republic Airplay (ČNS IFPI)	9
Czech Republic Singles Digital (ČNS IFPI)	100
France (SNEP)	196
Ireland (IRMA)	40
Scottish Singles Sales (Official Charts)	20
UK Singles (Official Charts)	19

== Certifications ==
Region	Certification	Certified units/sales
United Kingdom (BPI)	Silver	200,000^{‡}
^{‡} Sales+streaming figures based on certification alone.

== Release history ==
Region	Date	Format	Label
Ireland	9 December 2013	Digital download	Syco
United Kingdom	9 December 2013	Digital download	Syco
