= You're Nobody 'til Somebody Loves You =

Single by James Arthur

from the album James Arthur
- Released: 20 October 2013
- Recorded: 2013
- Genre: Pop; soul
- Length: 3:20
- Label: Syco
- Songwriters: James Arthur; Tom Barnes; Pete Kelleher; Ben Kohn
- Producer: TMS

James Arthur singles chronology
"Impossible" (2012)	"You're Nobody 'til Somebody Loves You" (2013)	"Recovery" (2013)

"You're Nobody 'til Somebody Loves You" is a song by British singer and songwriter James Arthur. Written by Arthur along with TMS, who also produced the record, it serves as his first single since winning the ninth series of The X Factor in 2012, his second single overall after "Impossible", and the lead single from his self-titled debut album.

== Background ==
Speaking to Capital FM about the song, Arthur called it: "One of those big, uplifting anthemic tunes. The rest of the album is quite diverse." The song received its debut airplay on Capital FM on 9 September 2013.

== Reception ==
=== Critical reception ===
Writing for the Metro, Seamus Duff said "With a possibly genuine new talent about to take the charts, The X Factor might in fact have produced their best winner yet." Robert Copsey of Digital Spy gave it four stars out of five, saying "It's hard times when nobody wants you," he sings in his unmistakably wobbly, soul-soaked vocal over a barrage of horns and toe-tapping percussion. Unsurprisingly, the result feels just as big – if not bigger – than before.

=== Chart performance ===
The single reached number 17 in New Zealand on 17 October 2013 and number 22 in Australia three days later. On 27 October, it debuted at number two on the UK singles chart, behind "Royals" by Lorde.

== Music video ==
The song's official music video was directed by Emil Nava and was uploaded to YouTube on 19 September 2013. It features Arthur performing at a street gig.

== Track listing ==
CD single
No.	Title	Length
1.	"You're Nobody 'til Someobody Loves You"	3:23
2.	"Wrecking Ball" (live at Radio Hamburg)	3:48

Digital download – EP
No.	Title	Length
1.	"You're Nobody 'til Somebody Love You" (Benga & LAXX Remix)	3:23
2.	"You're Nobody 'til Somebody Love You" (Raf Riley Remix) (featuring Lunar C)	4:05
3.	"You're Nobody 'til Somebody Love You" (Starkillers Radio Edit)	3:42
4.	"You're Nobody 'til Somebody Love You" (DJ Joachim Remix)	5:33

== Charts and certifications ==
=== Weekly charts ===
Chart (2013–14)	Peak position
Australia (ARIA)	22
Austria (Ö3 Austria Top 40)	55
Belgium (Ultratip Bubbling Under Flanders)	28
Belgium (Ultratip Bubbling Under Wallonia)	36
Czech Republic Airplay (ČNS IFPI)	39
Euro Digital Song Sales (Billboard)	7
France (SNEP)	158
Germany (GfK)	54
Hungary (Rádiós Top 40)	5
Hungary (Stream Top 40)	4
Ireland (IRMA)	12
New Zealand (Recorded Music NZ)	17
Scottish Singles Sales (Official Charts)	3
Slovakia Airplay (ČNS IFPI)	35
Switzerland (Schweizer Hitparade)	38
UK Singles (Official Charts)	2

=== Year-end charts ===
Chart (2013)	Position
Hungarian Airplay Chart	66
UK Singles (Official Charts Company)	121

=== Certifications ===
Certifications for You're Nobody 'til Somebody Loves You
Region	Certification	Certified units/sales
United Kingdom (BPI)	Silver	212,538

== Radio and release history ==
Country	Date	Format	Label
United Kingdom	9 September 2013	Radio premiere	Syco
Australia	11 October 2013	Digital download	Syco
New Zealand	11 October 2013	Digital download	Syco
Ireland	18 October 2013	Digital download	Syco
United Kingdom	20 October 2013	Digital download	Syco
