= Dotan (singer) =

Dutch-Israeli musician (born 1986)

Dotan דותן
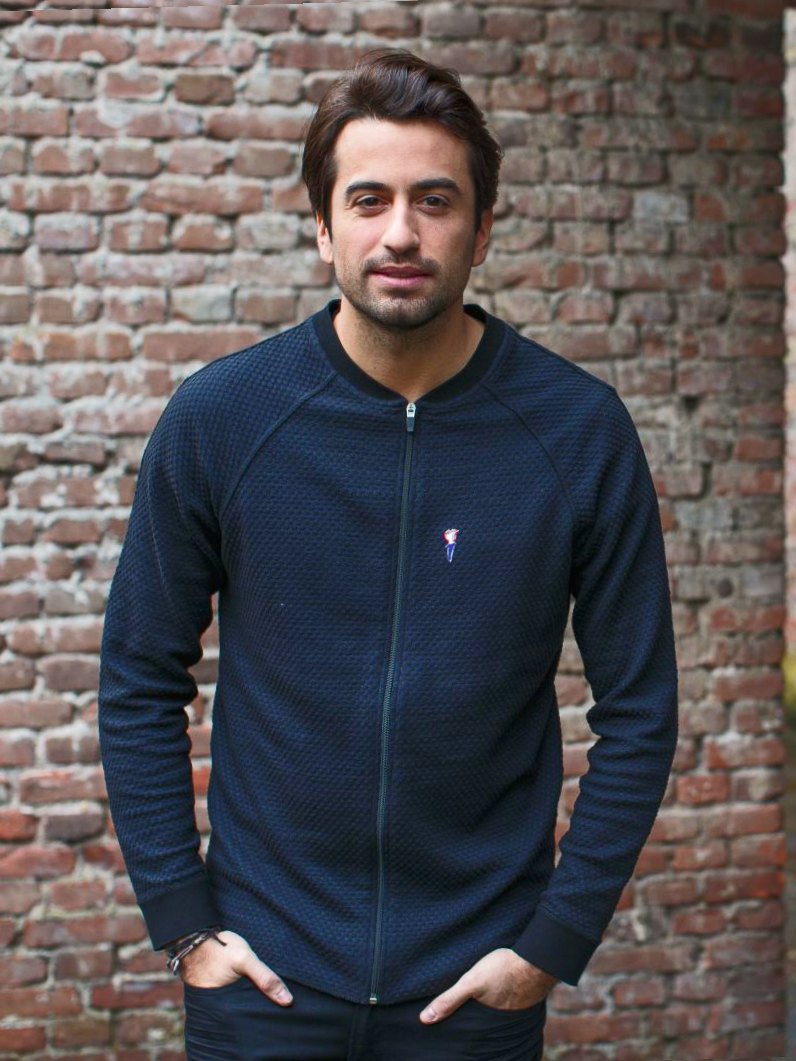
- Dotan in 2015

Background information
- Born: Dotan Harpenau; 26 October 1986 (age 39); Jerusalem, Israel
- Genres: Pop; indie
- Occupation: Musician
- Instruments: Vocals; guitar; piano
- Label: Universal
- Website: dotanmusic.com

Dotan Harpenau (Hebrew: דותן הרפנאו; born 26 October 1986), better known mononymously as Dotan, is a Dutch-Israeli singer-songwriter, multi-instrumentalist, and record producer.

== Biography ==
=== Personal life ===
Dotan was born in Jerusalem and moved to Amsterdam at the age of one. He came out as gay in 2019.

=== 2014–2015: 7 Layers ===
On 31 January 2014, Dotan released his self-produced studio album 7 Layers at Paradiso, Amsterdam. The album quickly reached number 2 on the Dutch Top 100 Charts according to Dutch news website NU.nl.

The first single, "Fall", was released on 17 January 2014. The second single, "Home", was nominated SuperCrazyTurboTopHit, 3FM Megahit, and Alarmschijf on Dutch Radio.

After several weeks at number one in the Dutch iTunes top 100, "Home" entered the Dutch MegaTop50 at number 1 and remained there for 4 weeks. "Home" also became number 1 in Belgium on 22 August. It peaked at number 9 on the German iTunes top 100.

The album 7 Layers achieved Gold status on 25 August, and "Home" reached Double Platinum status. It also went Gold in Belgium. The album reached Double Platinum on 15 October 2015 in the Netherlands, and "Home" achieved Triple Platinum status on 23 December 2014. The single also reached number 2 on the Next Big Sound chart on the American entertainment website Billboard.

The record is in the top five most streamed albums in the Netherlands on Spotify and number 10 in the Top 1,000 best albums in the Netherlands of all time.

The song "Hungry" reached number 2 on the annual list of 2015 on Belgium's radio station Studio Brussel.

In 2015 and 2016, Dotan toured across the United States twice with Ben Folds.

=== 2016–present: "Shadow Wind" and Numb ===
In January 2016, Dotan launched his own concert series, titled 7 Layers Sessions, at Bitterzoet, Amsterdam, where he promotes talented new national and international musicians. After some sold-out sessions at Bitterzoet, 7 Layers also added a festival edition in 2016. Dotan announced a second season in 2017.

Dotan released his single "Shadow Wind" on 4 August 2016, and this was chosen as the 2016 Olympic Games anthem. "Shadow Wind" was nominated as a 3FM Megahit as well as a 538 Alarmschijf and Radio 2 Topsong in the Netherlands, and peaked on the airplay chart at number one. After several sold-out tours through Europe, Dotan sold out the music arena Ziggo Dome in Amsterdam in 2018.

On 22 May 2020, Dotan released the EP Numb.

== Controversy ==
In April 2018, after several months of research, the Dutch newspaper de Volkskrant revealed that Dotan had enlisted the aid of at least 140 troll accounts to boost his online reputation and following. These accounts disparaged other musicians and made up feel-good stories about chance encounters with fans. de Volkskrant also revealed that Dotan's management had repeatedly tried to alter Dotan's Dutch Wikipedia page. The singer later confirmed the existence of these accounts, apologized, and temporarily halted all his social media activities.

== Discography ==
=== Albums ===
Album	Year	Peak positions				Certification
Album	Year	NL	BEL (FL)	BEL (WA)	GER	Certification
Dream Parade	2011	55	—	—	—	
7 Layers	2014	1	7	43	21	NVPI: 2× Platinum
Satellites	2021	14	80	—	—	
A Little Light in the Dark	2024	100	—	—	—	

=== EPs ===
- Numb (2020)

=== Singles ===
As main artist

Title	Year	Peak chart positions								Album
Title	Year	NL 40	NL 100	BEL (FL)	BEL (WA)	CH	GER	ITA	POL	Album
"Tell a Lie"	2011	59	—	—	—	—	—	—	—	Dream Parade
"This Town"	2011	29	20	—	—	—	—	—	—	Dream Parade
"Where We Belong"	2011	48	90	—	—	—	—	—	—	Dream Parade
"Fall"	2014	29	52	56	—	—	—	—	—	7 Layers
"Home"	2014	2	3	1	6	—	51	—	—	7 Layers
"Hungry"	2015	12	24	5	70	—	—	—	—	7 Layers
"Let the River In"	2015	31	53	— (Note: "Let the River In" did not enter the Tipparade of Flanders, but did enter the Bubbling Under.)	—	—	—	—	—	7 Layers
"Shadow Wind"	2016	25	88	74	— (Note: "Shadow Wind" did not enter the Tipparade of Wallonia, but did enter the Bubbling Under.)	—	—	—	—	Non-album singles
"Bones"	2017	50	24	— (Note: "Bones" did not enter the Tipparade of Flanders, but did enter the Bubbling Under.)	—	—	—	—	—	Non-album singles
"Numb"	2019	20	86	56	— (Note: "Shadow Wind" did not enter the Tipparade of Wallonia, but did enter the Bubbling Under.)	98	—	82	1	Satellites
"Letting Go"	2019	46	29	—	— (Note: "Letting Go" did not enter the Tipparade of Flanders, but did enter the Bubbling Under.)	—	—	—	—	Satellites
"Bleeding" (incl. acoustic version)	2020	50	—	—	—	—	—	—	—	Satellites
"No Words"	2020	52	—	—	—	—	—	—	—	Satellites
"There Will Be a Way"	2020	26	78	—	—	—	—	—	—	Satellites
"Mercy"	2021	54	30	—	—	—	—	—	—	Satellites
"Satellites"	2021	—	—	—	—	—	—	—	—	Satellites
"Diamonds in My Chest"	2023	—	—	—	—	—	—	—	—	A Little Light in the Dark
"Amsterdam"	2024	—	—	—	—	—	—	—	—	A Little Light in the Dark
"Drown Me in Your River"	2024	—	—	—	—	—	—	—	—	A Little Light in the Dark
"Last Goodbyes"	2025	—	—	—	—	—	—	—	—	A Little Light in the Dark
"—" denotes a recording that did not chart or was not released in that territory.

As featured artist

Title	Year	Peak chart positions						Album
Title	Year	NL 40	NL 100	BEL (FL)	BEL (WA)	GER	ITA	Album
"Never Felt a Love Like This" (Galantis and Hook n Sling featuring Dotan)	2020	—	—	—	—	—	—	Church (Galantis album)
"—" denotes a recording that did not chart or was not released in that territory.
