= James Arthur =

English singer and songwriter (born 1988)

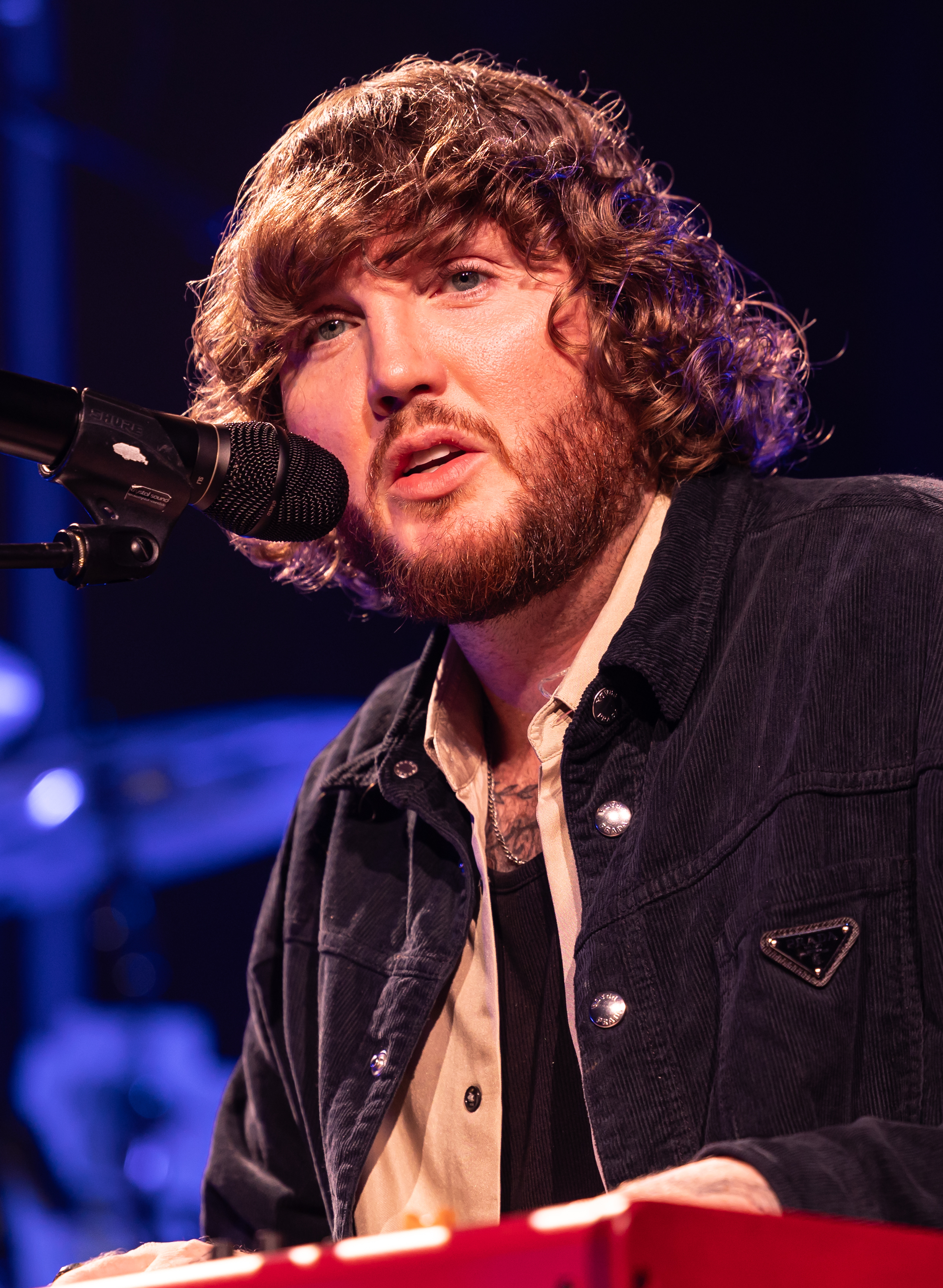
- Arthur in 2023

Background information
- Born: James Andrew Arthur; 2 March 1988 (age 38); Middlesbrough, North Yorkshire, England
- Genre: Pop
- Occupations: Singer; songwriter
- Instruments: Vocals; guitar
- Years active: 2011–present
- Labels: Columbia Records UK; Columbia Records Germany
- Website: jamesarthurofficial.com

James Andrew Arthur (born 2 March 1988) is an English singer and songwriter. He rose to fame after winning the ninth series of The X Factor in 2012. His debut single, a cover of Shontelle's "Impossible", was released by Syco Music after the final, and debuted at number 1 on the UK Singles Chart. Since then, it has gone on to sell over 2.5 million copies worldwide, making it the most successful winner's single in the show's history.

The follow-up single, "You're Nobody 'til Somebody Loves You", reached number 2 on the UK Singles Chart. He released his first album James Arthur in November 2013. The album debuted and peaked at number 2 on the UK Albums Chart. After this, he was involved in a series of controversies that led iTunes to offer refunds for the album.

Arthur parted ways with Simon Cowell's record label Syco in 2014. In 2015, he signed a new deal with Columbia Records and released his second studio album, Back from the Edge, in 2016. He then went on to re-sign with to Syco in the same year of 2016. The album's lead single, titled "Say You Won't Let Go" and released in September 2016, saw great success, peaking at number 1 on the UK Singles Chart and selling close to 2.7 million copies as of February 2021. Back from the Edge was released on 28 October 2016, and debuted at number 1 on the UK Albums Chart. On 18 October 2019, after releasing numerous singles throughout the prior two years, Arthur released his third studio album, You; this album debuted and peaked at number 2 on the UK Albums Chart. In February 2021, Arthur signed with Columbia Records UK and Columbia Records Germany after Syco had ceased operations.

== Early life ==
James Andrew Arthur was born on 2 March 1988 to an English mother, Shirley Ashworth, and a Scottish father, Neil Arthur. Neil was a delivery driver, but also used to be a DJ and drummer for many years, while Shirley was a fashion model and later a sales and marketing professional. Arthur has four sisters and a brother. His parents split up when he was two years old, and they each settled with new partners: when Arthur was three, Shirley began dating Ronnie Rafferty, a computer engineer, and Neil later married another woman; together they had Arthur's half-sister.

At the age of 14, Arthur entered part-time voluntary foster care: he lived with his father, Neil, for three days of the week and was in foster care in Brotton – about ten miles from Redcar – for the other four days.

Arthur first went to Ings Farm Primary School in Redcar. In 1997, when he was nine, he moved with his mother, his stepfather, and two of his sisters to Bahrain. In Bahrain, he studied at the local British School of Bahrain. In April 2001, when Arthur was 13, they moved back to England, having lived in Bahrain for a total of four years. Upon his return, he continued his studies at Rye Hills School in Redcar.

== Career ==
=== 2011–2012: Sins by the Sea and The X Factor ===
In 2011, Arthur uploaded many of his own songs to SoundCloud and YouTube, as well as an album entitled Sins by the Sea. The independent album included 16 tracks. Arthur formed his own musical projects. The James Arthur Project resulted in recorded and releasing two EPs, firstly a soulful pop EP named Hold On as The James Arthur Project in August 2012 in collaboration with John McGough. The tracks were written and arranged by McGough, and mixed by Matt Wanstall with all vocals by Arthur.

Arthur also released an EP as The James Arthur Band. The band consisted of Arthur (vocals and guitar), Jez Taylor (guitar), Chris Smalls (keyboards), Jordan Swain (drums) and Rich Doney (bass). In 2012, the band released The EP Collection CD with nine tracks with R&B, soul and hip hop influences, a compilation of tracks on both EPs.

In 2012, he auditioned in Newcastle for the ninth series of The X Factor, performing an acoustic rendition of judge Tulisa's "Young", before explaining his past, including a short spell in respite foster care and time spent in flats and bedsits after break-ups within his family. He also revealed his father and mother had hardly spoken to each other for over 20 years, and this was a reunion of sorts for them to attend his audition. He sang "A Million Love Songs" at bootcamp and was chosen as one of six contestants in the "Boys" category to advance to judges' houses. From this point onward, Arthur was mentored by Nicole Scherzinger. After his judges' houses performance of "I Can't Make You Love Me", he was picked as one of 12 contestants to advance to the live shows, and one of three in the "Boys" category.

After his second live performance, Arthur suffered from an anxiety attack backstage. While being treated at the studio, paramedics determined he did not need to go to hospital, and he was ordered back to his hotel to rest. He later returned for the results show the following night.

After his performance of LMFAO's "Sexy and I Know It" on the third live show on 20 October, Arthur was accused of plagiarism. His version was very similar to the rendition by YouTube star only1Noah, which was uploaded on 9 May 2012 and had over 13 million views at the time. However, Arthur later tweeted: "Btw doesn't everyone know I was putting a spin on Noah's version? It had 13.something million hits! Was I supposed to state the obvious?" In week 7, after performing "Can't Take My Eyes Off You", Arthur was in the final showdown. He sang "Fallin'" for survival against fellow favourite Ella Henderson, and the result went to deadlock; Scherzinger and Gary Barlow voted to send Arthur through to the quarter-final, while Tulisa and Louis Walsh voted to send Henderson through to the quarter-final. Resulting from the public vote, Arthur advanced to the quarter-final, receiving 13.7% of the vote whereas Henderson received 12.1%.

With 53.7% of the final vote against Jahméne Douglas's 38.9%, Arthur won The X Factor on 9 December 2012. This made him the first-ever winner of the show to have previously been in the bottom two.

The X Factor performances and results
Episode	Theme	Song	Result
First audition	Free choice	"Young"	Through to bootcamp
Bootcamp – stage 1	Group performance	"How to Save a Life" with Curtis Golden and James Vickery	Through to stage 2
Bootcamp – stage 2	Solo performance	"A Million Love Songs"	Through to judges' houses
Judges' houses	Free choice	"I Can't Make You Love Me"	Through to live shows
Judges' houses	Free choice	"Sexy and I Know It"	Through to live shows
Live show 1	Heroes	"Stronger"	Safe (6th) - 5.6%
Live show 2	Love and heartbreak	"No More Drama"	Safe (6th) - 7.4%
Live show 3	Club classics	"Sexy and I Know It"	Safe (6th) - 7.4%
Live show 4	Halloween	"Sweet Dreams"	Safe (3rd) - 12.0%
Live show 5	Number-ones	"Don't Speak"	Safe (6th) - 7.6%
Live show 6	Best of British	"Hometown Glory"	Safe (3rd) - 14.0%
Live show 7	Guilty pleasures	"Can't Take My Eyes Off You"	Bottom two (5th) - 13.7%
Live show 7	Final showdown	"Fallin'"	Safe (Deadlock)
Quarter-Final	Songs by ABBA	"SOS"	Safe (1st) - 40.7%
Quarter-Final	Motown songs	"Let's Get It On"	Safe (1st) - 40.7%
Semi-Final	Songs for someone special	"One"	Safe (1st) - 41.2%
Semi-Final	The song to get you to the final	"The Power of Love"	Safe (1st) - 41.2%
Final	Free choice	"Feeling Good"	Safe (1st) - 51.7%
Final	Mentor duets	"Make You Feel My Love" with Nicole Scherzinger	Safe (1st) - 51.7%
Final	Songs of the series	"Let's Get It On"	Winner - 53.7%
Final	Winner's single	"Impossible"	Winner - 53.7%

=== 2013–2015: James Arthur, controversies and leaving Syco ===
Following his victory, Arthur's winner's song, a cover of Shontelle's "Impossible", was released as a charity single for Together for Short Lives. It became the fastest-selling The X Factor winner's single so far, reaching 255,000 downloads within 48 hours and over 490,000 by the end of the week. The single topped the UK Singles Chart in its first week of release. After 11 days, it was the seventh-best-selling debut single from any contestant from The X Factor, with sales of 622,000. In its second week, the single dropped to number 2, but reclaimed the number 1 spot in its third week, and stayed at the top for a further week. After three weeks, it was the fifth best-selling single of 2012 with 897,000 copies sold. It has sold over 1.3 million copies in the UK, overtaking Alexandra Burke's version of "Hallelujah" to become the best-selling winners single ever. The song also peaked at number 1 in Ireland, two in Australia, New Zealand and Switzerland, and eight in Slovakia. In May 2013, Arthur released an EP Undiscovered Acoustic of six acoustic songs written and recorded by John McGough with all tracks sung by Arthur.

On 7 August 2013, Arthur announced that his next single would be called "You're Nobody 'til Somebody Loves You", which was released to UK radio stations on 9 September 2013. The song was officially released worldwide on 20 October 2013 and debuted at number 2 in the UK, falling just behind Lorde's "Royals". Arthur's debut album, James Arthur, was released by Syco Music on 1 November 2013. The album included the singles "Impossible", his X Factor winner's single, and "You're Nobody 'til Somebody Loves You", as well as collaborations with Emeli Sandé and Chasing Grace. It debuted in the UK at number 2, behind Eminem's The Marshall Mathers LP 2, and became the 30th best-selling album of 2013 in the country. "Recovery" was released as the album's third single on 15 December 2013 and debuted at number 19 on the UK Singles Chart. On 14 January 2014, Arthur confirmed on Twitter that "Get Down" would be the album's fourth single. On 5 January 2014, Arthur embarked on his first headlining tour, the James Arthur Tour, a 37-date tour around Europe.

In November 2013, Arthur generated much controversy over the use of homophobic lyrics in a song. Mickey Worthless, a Croydon battle rapper, had issued "Stay In Your Lane" a track mocking Arthur, because Worthless didn't feel it was right that Arthur was presenting himself as a battle rapper on national radio. Arthur responded to Worthless with his vitriolic diss track "Hey Mickey" issuing string of slurs directed at Worthless, rapping "Hilarious, precarious you Talibani confused, imbellic mimic of a gimmick" adding the slur "You fucking queer". This sparked outrage among the LGBT community and led to Twitter spats with comedians Frankie Boyle and Matt Lucas, and singer Lucy Spraggan. Arthur immediately apologised for his comments and claimed that he was not homophobic. Following this he announced that he would not be posting on Twitter anymore, with his management taking up control of his page. The backlash continued, however, with a Facebook campaign to see his upcoming appearance on The X Factor be cancelled. iTunes offered refunds for his album due to complaints from customers. After Arthur switched on the Christmas lights in Manchester on 8 November 2013, Manchester City Council said that he would have been replaced if the controversy had happened earlier. On 22 November 2013, Arthur's management announced that the singer would be cancelling all public engagements for the next seven days due to exhaustion. Singer Olly Murs came to Arthur's defence, but said later that he was not defending the choice of lyrics.

Further controversies arose after the reviews to his projected rap mixtape All the World's a Stage, particularly regarding the track "Follow the Leader" where he rapped "I'm gonna blow up your family like I'm a terrorist". This led to further accusations of Arthur glorifying violence. This infuriated Simon Cowell who said "I think James, unfortunately, has had so many issues with what he has done publicly – which is a real issue with me... Somebody should have told him to shut up and just put the records out". On 5 April 2014, several media outlets began to report that Arthur had been dropped from Syco, following the dispute over "Follow the Leader". He took to Twitter to deny the claims; however, on 11 June 2014, Arthur announced that he and Syco had parted ways by mutual agreement. Arthur independently released his mixtape All the World's a Stage on 16 May 2014.

During the summer of 2014, Arthur stated that he was working on his second studio album and was close to signing a new record deal. He performed at V Festival in August, 2014. On 19 October 2014, Arthur released a collaboration with British record producer Rymez entitled "Kryptonite"; the song entered the iTunes top 150 on pre-orders alone. On 22 April 2015, Arthur unveiled a demo track titled "Promise" on YouTube. He embarked on "The Story So Far Tour" in May 2015. On 21 June 2015, he performed in the final of X Factor Adria. On 6 September 2015, he announced that he had signed with Columbia Records and that a new album was on the way.

=== 2016–2017: Back from the Edge ===
On 8 January 2016, Arthur released a song called "The Truth" on iTunes in the United States. Following the song's release, he took to Twitter and clarified that the song would feature on Family Therapy with Dr. Jenn, and that it was not the lead single.

Arthur released "Say You Won't Let Go" on 9 September 2016 as the lead single from his second studio album, Back from the Edge, which was released on 28 October 2016. (Note: Back from the Edge debuted at number 1 on the UK Albums Chart with 41,000 combined sales, and has had more than 400,000 sales as of February 2021.) Arthur also re-signed with Syco. On 30 September 2016, the single reached number 1 on the UK Singles Chart, becoming his second chart topper and making him the first male winner to have two UK number-one singles (as of 2016). The song remained on the top spot for three consecutive weeks. In January 2017, the single became his first chart entry on the Billboard charts in the US. By the second week of January 2017, it had surpassed the 1 million sales mark in the UK, making James the first-ever X Factor act to have two singles sell over a million copies in his homeland as well as the 21st act in UK chart history to have two or more million sellers. As of February 2017, it had sold two million copies worldwide. It was later confirmed that he will be appearing at the V Festival in August, having previously performed there in 2013. The same month, OneRepublic lead singer Ryan Tedder also confirmed that he would be joining the band and Fitz and the Tantrums as a support act on their Honda Civic Tour in the US and Canada during the summer.

Arthur's follow-up single, "Safe Inside", peaked at number 31 on the UK charts, and the third single, "Can I Be Him", at number 69. In early April, it was announced that he would be embarking on his first arena tour across the UK and Ireland with fellow X Factor contestant Ella Henderson as his support act. The following month, Arthur collaborated with Machine Gun Kelly on the song "Go for Broke" from Kelly's album Bloom, which also served as the official theme song for WWE's SummerSlam in 2017. The same month it was announced that Arthur would be one of the vocalists featured on a cover of Simon & Garfunkel's "Bridge over Troubled Water", which was recorded to raise funds for those affected by the Grenfell Tower fire. The single was released on 21 June and went on to enter the UK charts at number 1 two days later. On 20 June 2017, James confirmed on Twitter that he would be a guest vocalist on drum n bass act Rudimental's single "Sun Comes Up", set for release on 30 June. He performed the song at V Festival with the group in August and it became another UK Top 10 single for him. Throughout the summer he toured the US and Canada with OneRepublic and Fitz and the Tantrums with the tour ending on 12 September in Texas. Two nights later he performed alongside Julia Michaels and Kelly Clarkson at Fresh 102.7's Fall Fest at The Theater at Madison Square Garden, New York. In October, his autobiography Back to the Boy was released, and he did a series of book signings throughout the UK. He also received a nomination for an American Music Award in the 'New Artist of the Year' category.

=== 2017–2019: You ===
James Arthur released the song "Naked" as the lead single from his then-upcoming third studio album on 24 November 2017.

On 1 June 2018, James Arthur released the singles, "You Deserve Better" and "At My Weakest". His third single of 2018, "Empty Space", was released on 19 October. In November 2018, Arthur was featured on The Greatest Showman: Reimagined, alongside Anne-Marie, for the song "Rewrite the Stars". In October 2018, James Arthur appeared on the Brazilian soap opera O Tempo não Para, singing the song "Naked".

In December 2018, Arthur was featured in "The Power of Love", the UK The X Factor winning song by the season 15 winner Dalton Harris, which gave Arthur his sixth UK top 10 hit. The duet was a cover of an original by Frankie Goes to Hollywood from 1984.

On 10 May 2019, Arthur released a single called "Falling Like the Stars".

Arthur's third studio album, You, was released on 18 October 2019 along with the album's seventh single, "Quite Miss Home". The album debuted and peaked at number 2 on the UK Albums Chart, dropped to number 10 in the following week, and stayed on the chart for a total of 24 weeks.

=== 2020–present: It'll All Make Sense in the End, guest appearances, and signing with other labels ===
In July 2020, Arthur confirmed via Twitter that he had begun working on a fourth studio album "for the last couple of months", further revealing "I couldn't be more excited to share with you this new lane I'm playing around in, I think you'll be surprised in a good way. This is the album I've wanted to make for so long!"

Arthur provided the vocals on Sigala's track "Lasting Lover", released on 4 September 2020.

After his label Syco ceased operations, it was reported in a press release on 15 February 2021 that Arthur had signed with Columbia Records UK in a co-deal with Columbia Records Germany, the last of whom has worked with Arthur since Back from the Edge. The same press release reported that his fourth studio album is scheduled for release in 2021, and that the lead single for this album is scheduled for release in March of the same year. Arthur told Music Week that "[t]here was a definite genre or lane [he] wanted to do, which was mixing rock, guitar-based stuff with trap, hip-hop, and pop". It'll All Make Sense in the End reached number 3 in the UK Charts in 2021, while follow-up album Bitter Sweet Love became his 2nd number 1 album on the UK album charts.

His sixth studio album, Pisces, was released on 25 April 2025.

== Personal life ==
Arthur began an on-and-off relationship with dancer Jessica Grist in 2012 after meeting on The X Factor. They split in 2021 but reconciled the next year. Grist gave birth to their daughter in November 2022.

Arthur supports his local football team Middlesbrough F.C. as well as Rangers F.C.

Arthur is a vegan. In September 2016, after opening up about his struggles with drugs, anxiety and depression, it was announced that he had become an ambassador for UK mental health charity SANE.

== Discography ==
- James Arthur (2013)
- Back from the Edge (2016)
- You (2019)
- It'll All Make Sense in the End (2021)
- Bitter Sweet Love (2024)
- Pisces (2025)

== Concert tours ==
- The X Factor Live Tour (2013)
- James Arthur Tour (2014)
- The Story So Far Tour (2015)
- 16th Annual Honda Civic Tour (2017) (supporting OneRepublic)
- Back from the Edge Tour (2017)
- The Twenty Tour (2019) (supporting Westlife on their Irish concert tour dates)
- You: Up Close and Personal Tour (2019)
- YOU Uk Tour (2020)
- It'll All Make Sense in the End Tour (2022)
- Cars Outside Tour(Pullathankavala, Manjapra(2023))
- Bitter Sweet Love World Tour (2024)
- The Pisces World Tour (2025-2026)

== Awards and nominations ==
Year	Organisation	Award	Work	Result	Ref.
2013	BRIT Awards	British Single of the Year	"Impossible"	Nominated	
2013	Los Premios 40 Principales	Best International Song	"Impossible"	Won	
2013	NRJ Music Awards	International Breakthrough of the Year	"Impossible"	Won	
2013	Žebřík Music Awards	Best International Discovery	Himself	Nominated	
2014	Radio Regenbogen Awards	Pop International	Himself	Won	
2017	BRIT Awards	British Artist Video of the Year	"Say You Won't Let Go"	Nominated	
2017	BRIT Awards	British Single of the Year	"Say You Won't Let Go"	Nominated	
2017	Teen Choice Awards	Choice Breakout Artist	Himself	Nominated	
2017	American Music Awards	New Artist of the Year	Himself	Nominated	
2018	BMI Pop Awards	Award-Winning Song	"Say You Won't Let Go"	Won	
2019	iHeartRadio Music Awards	Best Cover Song	"Rewrite the Stars" (with Anne-Marie)	Nominated	
2022	BMI London Awards	Award-Winning Song	"Lasting Lover" (with Sigala)	Won	
2023	British Phonographic Industry	Brits Billion Award	Himself	Won	

Awards and achievements
Preceded by Little Mix	Winner of The X Factor; 2012	Succeeded by Sam Bailey
