= Say You Won't Let Go =

2016 single by James Arthur

Single by James Arthur

from the album Back from the Edge
- Released: 9 September 2016
- Recorded: 2016
- Genre: Pop; folk; R&B
- Length: 3:31
- Label: Columbia
- Songwriters: James Arthur; Andrew Frampton; Daniel O'Donoghue; Steve Kipner; Mark Sheehan; Neil Ormandy; Steve Solomon
- Producers: Alexander Beitzke; Bradley Spence

James Arthur singles chronology
"Otherwise" (2015)	"Say You Won't Let Go" (2016)	"Safe Inside" (2017)

Music video
- "Say You Won't Let Go" on YouTube

"Say You Won't Let Go" is a song by English singer and songwriter James Arthur. The song was released as a digital download on 9 September 2016 in the United Kingdom by Columbia Records as the lead single from his second studio album Back from the Edge (2016). The single peaked at the top of the UK Singles Chart, a position it maintained for three weeks. Outside the United Kingdom, the single has topped the charts in Australia, New Zealand, Sweden and the Republic of Ireland. It also became his breakthrough hit in the US, peaking at number 11 on the Billboard Hot 100. In early March, it had gone double platinum in the UK. In May 2018, it was reported that the Script had launched legal proceedings against Arthur due to alleged copyright infringement in regards to the song.

In response to claims that the song sounds similar to the Script's "The Man Who Can't Be Moved", the song's writers initially decided not to pursue legal action. However, following a claim in May 2018, they were successfully awarded a songwriting credit.

== Commercial performance ==
On 12 September 2016, the song was at number 30 on The Official Chart Update in the United Kingdom. On 16 September 2016, the song entered the UK Singles Chart at number 25, and peaked at number one two weeks later, becoming Arthur's second number one and spending three consecutive weeks at the top. The song was ranked the nineteenth biggest-selling song of 2016 in the UK, making Arthur the biggest-selling British male artist of the year. By the second week of January 2017, it had surpassed the one million sales mark, making him the first-ever X Factor act to have two singles sell over a million copies in his homeland.

In the United States, the song debuted at #100 on the date November 12, 2016. The song peaked at #11 for two non-consecutive weeks being kept out of the top 10 from "Malibu" by Miley Cyrus the first week and "Congratulations" by Post Malone the second week. It spent 52 weeks on the chart. The song is his first single to chart on the US Billboard Hot 100, making Arthur only the third winner to chart on the Hot 100 following Leona Lewis and Little Mix. In May 2017, the song reached No. 1 on the Adult Pop Songs Airplay Chart, more than six months after its release in the US. The song was certified diamond in the US by the RIAA on February 15, 2023. The song has sold over 1,208,000 digital copies in the US as of September 2017. It was the eighth best-selling song of 2017 in the US, with 1,195,000 copies sold in 2017.

By 2021, the single had sold 2,676,756 copies in the UK.

On 15 September 2016, the song entered the Irish Singles Chart at number 91 before peaking at number one on 14 October and spending four non-consecutive weeks at the top of the charts. The song has also charted in Australia, France, New Zealand and Sweden. On February 26, 2017, it was announced on Channel 4's Sunday Brunch that the single had sold 2 million copies worldwide.

As of October 2024, the song is the 15th most streamed song in Spotify history, having amassed over three billion streams on the platform.

== Music video ==
A music video to accompany the release of "Say You Won't Let Go" was first released onto YouTube on 9 September 2016 at a total length of three minutes and thirty seconds. As of August 2025, it has received over 1.7 billion views on YouTube.

== Live performances ==
- The X Factor (9 October 2016)
- Sunrise (22 November 2016)
- The Late Late Show with James Corden (3 January 2017)
- The Today Show (5 January 2017)
- The Tonight Show Starring Jimmy Fallon (25 April 2017)
- Boy Band (24 August 2017)
- America's Got Talent (20 September 2017)

== Track listing ==
Digital download
No.	Title	Length
1.	"Say You Won't Let Go"	3:31

== Charts ==
=== Weekly charts ===
Chart (2016–2018)	Peak position
Australia (ARIA)	1
Austria (Ö3 Austria Top 40)	5
Belgium (Ultratop 50 Flanders)	10
Belgium (Ultratop 50 Wallonia)	6
Canada Hot 100 (Billboard)	9
Czech Republic Airplay (ČNS IFPI)	2
Czech Republic Singles Digital (ČNS IFPI)	10
Denmark (Tracklisten)	4
Euro Digital Song Sales (Billboard)	1
France (SNEP)	19
Germany (GfK)	6
Hungary (Rádiós Top 40)	28
Hungary (Single Top 40)	38
Ireland (IRMA)	1
Israel International Airplay (Media Forest)	7
Italy (FIMI)	22
Japan Hot 100 (Billboard)	18
Lebanon (Lebanese Top 20)	6
Malaysia (RIM)	4
Netherlands (Dutch Top 40)	2
Netherlands (Single Top 100)	1
New Zealand (Recorded Music NZ)	1
Norway (VG-lista)	9
Portugal (AFP)	2
Scotland Singles (Official Charts)	1
Slovakia Airplay (ČNS IFPI)	19
Slovakia Singles Digital (ČNS IFPI)	12
Slovenia (SloTop50)	18
Spain (Promusicae)	24
Sweden (Sverigetopplistan)	1
Switzerland (Schweizer Hitparade)	4
UK Singles (Official Charts)	1
US Billboard Hot 100	11
US Adult Alternative Airplay (Billboard)	16
US Adult Contemporary (Billboard)	3
US Adult Pop Airplay (Billboard)	1
US Pop Airplay (Billboard)	6

Chart (2021–2024)	Peak position
Global 200 (Billboard)	96
Philippines Hot 100 (Billboard)	80

=== Year-end charts ===
Chart (2016)	Position
Australia (ARIA)	22
Germany (Official German Charts)	79
Netherlands (Dutch Top 40)	58
Netherlands (Single Top 100)	80
New Zealand (Recorded Music NZ)	46
Sweden (Sverigetopplistan)	58
Switzerland (Schweizer Hitparade)	86
UK Singles (Official Charts Company)	19
Chart (2017)	Position
Australia (ARIA)	45
Belgium (Ultratop Flanders)	66
Belgium (Ultratop Wallonia)	36
Canada (Canadian Hot 100)	13
Denmark (Tracklisten)	25
France (SNEP)	106
Hungary (Stream Top 40)	73
Italy (FIMI)	76
Netherlands (Dutch Top 40)	24
Netherlands (Single Top 100)	22
New Zealand (Recorded Music NZ)	25
Portugal (AFP)	43
Spain (PROMUSICAE)	99
Sweden (Sverigetopplistan)	29
Switzerland (Schweizer Hitparade)	47
UK Singles (Official Charts Company)	46
US Billboard Hot 100	11
US Adult Contemporary (Billboard)	7
US Adult Top 40 (Billboard)	5
US Mainstream Top 40 (Billboard)	24
Chart (2018)	Position
Portugal (AFP)	164
US Adult Contemporary (Billboard)	18
Chart (2020)	Position
Australia (ARIA)	97
Chart (2021)	Position
Australia (ARIA)	73
Global 200 (Billboard)	100
Portugal (AFP)	152
Chart (2022)	Position
Australia (ARIA)	80
Chart (2024)	Position
Philippines (Philippines Hot 100)	89

=== Decade-end charts ===
Chart (2010–2019)	Position
Australia (ARIA)	38
UK Singles (Official Charts Company)	23

== Certifications ==
Region	Certification	Certified units/sales
Australia (ARIA)	19× Platinum	1,330,000^{‡}
Austria (IFPI Austria)	3× Platinum	90,000^{‡}
Belgium (BRMA)	2× Platinum	80,000^{‡}
Brazil (Pro-Música Brasil)	3× Diamond	750,000^{‡}
Canada (Music Canada)	Diamond	800,000^{‡}
Denmark (IFPI Danmark)	5× Platinum	450,000^{‡}
France (SNEP)	Diamond	333,333^{‡}
Germany (BVMI)	2× Platinum	800,000^{‡}
Italy (FIMI)	3× Platinum	150,000^{‡}
Mexico (AMPROFON)	3× Platinum+Gold	210,000^{‡}
New Zealand (RMNZ)	10× Platinum	300,000^{‡}
Poland (ZPAV)	2× Platinum	40,000^{‡}
Portugal (AFP)	7× Platinum	175,000^{‡}
Spain (Promusicae)	4× Platinum	240,000^{‡}
Sweden (GLF)	7× Platinum	280,000^{‡}
Switzerland (IFPI Switzerland)	Platinum	30,000^{‡}
United Kingdom (BPI)	7× Platinum	4,200,000^{‡}
United States (RIAA)	Diamond	10,000,000^{‡}
^{‡} Sales+streaming figures based on certification alone.

== Release history ==
Region	Date	Format	Label
United Kingdom	9 September 2016	Digital download	Columbia

== See also ==
- List of best-selling singles in Australia
