= Martin Wave =

Swedish songwriter, multi-instrumentalist, singer & music producer

- Born: Lars Martin Wiklund; 1989 (age 35–36); Sala, Sweden
- Genres: R&B; pop; dance
- Occupations: Songwriter; record producer
- Instruments: Guitar, keyboards, vocals
- Years active: 2018–present

Lars Martin Wiklund, known professionally as Martin Wave, is a Swedish songwriter, multi-instrumentalist, singer and music producer residing in Los Angeles. In addition to his work in the cinematic space, he has become a collaborator on a list of artist projects across pop, R&B, electronic and hip hop.

Martin has landed placements in film, TV, trailers, promotions, commercials and gaming, including the official trailers for John Wick: Chapter 3 - Parabellum, Ad Astra, and Mortal Engines and scoring the likes of World of Warcraft, FIFA, and Swedish-folk music inspired Drimfrost Studio's Bramble: The Mountain King.

Recent pop cuts include "Here's Your Song" by Chloe Lilac, "Numb", "Letting Go" & "No Words" by Dotan, "Ghost" by Christopher, an official remix of "FUN!" by Vince Staples, "Too Much Of A Good Thing" by Pell and the majority of COTIS' project.

== Production discography ==
Year	Artist	Song	Album	Role
2018	COTIS	"Phone Light Up"	WAIT!	Writer, producer
2018	COTIS	"All Night"	WAIT!	Writer, producer
2018	COTIS	"Ride"	WAIT!	Writer, producer
2018	COTIS	"Movie Scene"	WAIT!	Writer, producer
2018	COTIS	"Blame"	WAIT!	Writer, producer
2018	COTIS	"Feel Something Again"	WAIT!	Writer, producer
2019	Tritonal (group) ft. Ryann	"Hard Pass"	U & Me	Writer, producer
2019	Sylo Nozra	"FOMO"		Writer, producer
2019	Dotan (singer)	"Numb"		Writer, producer
2019	Pell (musician)	"Too Much Of A Good Thing"	Gravity	Writer, producer
2019	Dotan (singer)	"Letting Go"		Writer, producer
2019	COTIS	"Reasons"	RECKLESS	Writer, producer
2019	COTIS	"Simulation"	RECKLESS	Writer, producer
2019	Steelfeather	"Something In The Air"	Steelfeather	Writer, producer, Artist
2019	Steelfeather	"Avalanche"	Steelfeather	Writer, producer, Artist
2019	Steelfeather	"Strange Life"	Steelfeather	Writer, producer, Artist
2019	Steelfeather	"Heart Of Darkness"	Steelfeather	Writer, producer, Artist
2020	Christopher (singer)	"Ghost"		Writer, producer
2020	Chloe Lilac	"Here's Your Song"		Writer, producer
2020	Vince Staples	"FUN! (SILO x Martin Wave Remix)"		Producer
2020	BJOERN	"Hold Me"		Writer, producer
2020	Maximillian	"Crossroads"	Still Alive	Writer, producer
2020	7715, lil aaron	"gone"		Writer, producer
2020	Alok, THRDL!FE	"Hear Me Tonight"		Vocalist
2020	Dotan (singer)	"No Words"	Numb	Writer, producer
2020	COTIS	"Girls from the North"	RECKLESS	Writer, producer
2020	COTIS	"Where U At"	RECKLESS	Writer, producer
2020	COTIS	"Reckless"	RECKLESS	Writer, producer
2020	COTIS	"Function"	RECKLESS	Writer, producer
2020	COTIS	"Up and Away"	RECKLESS	Writer, producer
2020	COTIS	"22"	RECKLESS	Writer, producer
2020	Steelfeather	"Can You Feel It Coming"	Come Hell or High Water	Writer, producer
2020	Chloe Lilac	"DOUCHEBAG"	DOUCHEBAG	Writer, producer
2020	Chloe Lilac	"Miss You ft. Kota The Friend"	DOUCHEBAG	Writer, producer
2020	Akazi	"AK-47"		Writer, producer
2020	Alok	"Alive (It Feels Like)"		Vocalist
2020	7715	"2 Much"	Encino: Part 1	Writer, producer
2020	Dotan (singer)	"There Will Be a Way"		Writer, producer
2020	Steelfeather	"Can You Feel It Coming	Come Hell or High Water	Writer, producer
2020	Steelfeather	"Come Hell or High Water"	Come Hell or High Water	Writer, producer
2020	Steelfeather	"Long Way Down"	Come Hell or High Water	Writer, producer
2020	Steelfeather	"Woman's World"	Come Hell or High Water	Writer, producer
2020	Steelfeather	"This Is Only the Beginning"	Come Hell or High Water	Writer, producer
2021	COTIS	"Not Around"		Writer, producer
2021	ELI	"Gone"		Writer, producer
2021	Kastra	"Fool For You"		Writer
2021	Lars Martin	"Plans"		Writer, producer, Artist
2021	COTIS	"What's It Gonna Be"		Writer, producer
2021	Nolo Grace ft. Sean Kingston	"Wake Up"		Producer
2021	Dotan	"Mercy"		Writer, producer
2021	NCT Dream	"Hot Sauce"	Hot Sauce (NCT Dream album)	Writer, producer
2021	COTIS	"So Good"		Writer, producer
2021	Dotan (singer)	"With You"	Satellites	Writer, producer
2021	Alok, Alan Walker, Imanbek	"Sweet Dreams (Alok Remix)"		Vocalist
2021	Tyler Shaw	"I See You"		Writer, producer
2021	Chloe Lilac	"sick"		Writer, producer
2021	Alok & Steve Aoki	"Typical (feat. Lars Martin)"		Vocalist
2022	Lokoy	"Greyson"		Writer, producer
2022	Bas	"Run It Up"		Writer, producer
2022	Greyson Chance	"My Dying Spirit"	Palladium	Writer, producer
2022	Chloe Lilac	"lily's backyard"	you were good to me (deluxe)	Writer, producer
2022	Chloe Lilac	"how does your girlfriend feel about it"	you were good to me (deluxe)	Writer, producer
2022	Chloe Lilac	"only love song"	you were good to me (deluxe)	Writer, producer
2022	Chloe Lilac	"sound in my head"	you were good to me (deluxe)	Writer, producer
2022	Liv Miraldi	"Same People"		Writer, producer
2023	Grace & Moji	"Our Love"		Artist, writer, producer
2023	Grace & Moji	"Monster"		Artist, writer, producer
2023	Grace & Moji	"Tipping Point"		Artist, writer, producer
2023	Paloma Faith	"How You Leave A Man"		Producer
2023	Grace & Moji	"Sad Times"		Artist, writer, producer
2023	Paloma Faith	"Bad Woman"		Producer
2023	Grace & Moji	"Christmas Hits Different With You"		Artist, writer, producer
