= Paloma Faith discography =

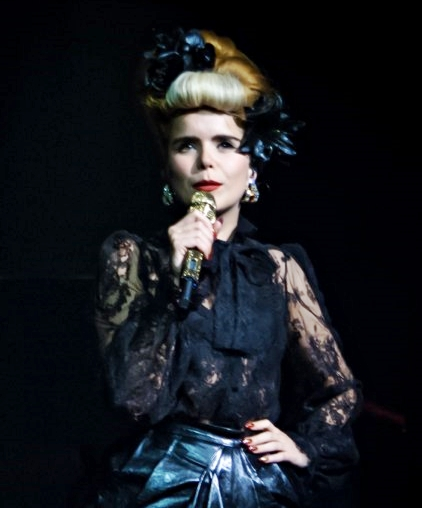
- Paloma Faith performing in 2013
- Studio albums: 6
- Extended plays: 1
- Singles: 43
- Music videos: 36

English singer and songwriter Paloma Faith has released six studio albums, 43 singles and 36 music videos. Faith made her debut in September 2009 with the studio album Do You Want the Truth or Something Beautiful?, which peaked at number nine in the United Kingdom and was later certified double-platinum. Its first two singles, "Stone Cold Sober" and "New York", both peaked within the top twenty in the United Kingdom. The album spawned three more original singles: "Do You Want the Truth or Something Beautiful?", "Upside Down" and "Smoke & Mirrors".

In 2012, Faith released her second album, Fall to Grace. It was preceded by the single, "Picking Up the Pieces", which charted at number seven in the UK, becoming the singer's first top-ten single. "30 Minute Love Affair", "Just Be", "Black & Blue" and "Never Tear Us Apart" were all released as additional singles, the latter of which, a cover of the original by INXS, became Faith's fourth single to chart in the top 20 in the UK.

Faith's third studio album A Perfect Contradiction was released in 2014. Lead single "Can't Rely on You" charted at number ten in the UK, while second single "Only Love Can Hurt Like This", reached number six, marking Faith's highest-charting single in the country. The single also reached the summit of the Australian Singles Chart. "Trouble with My Baby" and "Ready for the Good Life" were released as the final singles from the album, the latter of which being from the repackaged Outsiders' Edition. The album was later certified Faith's third double-platinum record. The singer was also the featured vocalist on Sigma's number one single "Changing" the same year, earning Faith her first chart topping single of her career.

Faith released her fourth studio album The Architect in 2017, following a short time away from the industry to have her first child. The album debuted at number one on the UK Albums Chart, marking it the first chart-topping album of her career. It includes "Crybaby" and on download only a cover of Mama Cass Elliot's 1969 single "Make Your Own Kind of Music", which was promoted through a TV commercial with Škoda. The following year, Faith was featured on Sigala's single "Lullaby", which charted at number six in the UK and was certified Platinum.

Faith released her fifth album Infinite Things in 2020 and was certified silver, and 4 years later, she released her sixth studio album The Glorification of Sadness, on 16 February 2024.

== Studio albums ==
Title	Album details	Peak chart positions										Sales	Certifications
Title	Album details	UK	AUS	FIN	IRE	NLD	NZ	SWI	SCO	US	US Heat.	Sales	Certifications
Do You Want the Truth or Something Beautiful?	Released: 28 September 2009; Label: Epic; Formats: CD, music download, streaming	9	—	33	26	50	—	37	12	—	—	UK: 742,768	BPI: 2× Platinum
Fall to Grace	Released: 28 May 2012; Label: RCA; Formats: CD, LP, music download, streaming	2	49	44	10	—	15	36	1	170	2	UK: 713,739	BPI: 2× Platinum
A Perfect Contradiction	Released: 10 March 2014; Label: RCA; Formats: CD, music download, streaming	2	4	—	8	41	9	91	2	176	6	UK: 767,128	BPI: 2× Platinum; ARIA: Gold; RMNZ: Platinum
The Architect	Released: 17 November 2017; Label: RCA; Formats: CD, music download, streaming	1	57	—	18	—	— (Note: The Architect did not enter the NZ Top 40 Albums Chart, but peaked at number five on the NZ Heatseeker Albums Chart.)	—	1	—	22	UK: 450,000	BPI: Platinum
Infinite Things	Released: 13 November 2020; Label: RCA; Formats: CD, LP, music download, streaming	4	—	—	—	—	—	—	5	—	—		BPI: Silver
The Glorification of Sadness	Released: 16 February 2024; Label: RCA; Formats: CD, LP, music download, streaming	2	—	—	—	—	—	—	2	—	—		
In Full Colour!	Release date: 5 March 2027; Label: RCA; Formats: Cassette, CD, LP, music download, streaming	To be released											
"—" denotes album that did not chart or was not released

== Extended plays ==
List of EPs, with selected details
Title	Details
iTunes Festival: London 2010	Released: 7 July 2010; Format: Digital, streaming; Label: Sony
Spotify Sessions	Released: 11 August 2014; Format: Streaming; Label: Sony
Spotify Singles	Released: 14 November 2018; Format: Streaming; Label: Soney
A Perfect Contradiction - Live	Released: 2019; Format: Digital, streaming; Label: Sony
When Paloma Got Stuck Down the Chimney (at Christmas)	Released: 1 December 2023; Format: Digital, streaming; Label: Sony
Sleigh All Day	Released: 28 November 2025; Format: Digital, streaming; Label: Sony

== Compilation albums ==
List of compilations, with selected details
Title	Details
Do You Want The Truth Or Something Beautiful?: Rarities	Released: 2019; Format: Digital, streaming; Label: Sony
Do You Want The Truth Or Something Beautiful?: Remixes	Released: 2019; Format: Digital, streaming; Label: Sony
Fall to Grace: Rarities	Released: 2019; Format: Digital, streaming; Label: Sony
A Perfect Contradiction: B-Sides and Rarities	Released: 2019; Format: Digital, streaming; Label: Sony
Mad	Released: 6 September 2026; Format: Digital, streaming; Label: Sony
Bad	Released: 17 September 2026; Format: Digital, streaming; Label: Sony
Sad	Released: 23 September 2026; Format: Digital, streaming; Label: Sony

== Singles ==
=== As lead artist ===
Title	Year	Peak chart positions									Certifications	Album
Title	Year	UK	AUS	CRO	GER	IRE	NLD	NZ	SWI	SCO	Certifications	Album
"Stone Cold Sober"	2009	17	—	—	70	—	84	30	36	10	BPI: Silver	Do You Want the Truth or Something Beautiful?
"New York"	2009	15	—	—	54	12	—	—	15	9	BPI: Gold	Do You Want the Truth or Something Beautiful?
"Do You Want the Truth or Something Beautiful?"	2009	64	—	—	—	—	—	—	—	32		Do You Want the Truth or Something Beautiful?
"Upside Down"	2010	55	—	—	—	—	—	—	—	51	BPI: Gold	Do You Want the Truth or Something Beautiful?
"New York" (featuring Ghostface Killah)	2010	44	—	—	—	—	—	—	—	—		Do You Want the Truth or Something Beautiful?
"Smoke & Mirrors"	2010	140	—	—	—	—	—	—	—	—		Do You Want the Truth or Something Beautiful?
"Picking Up the Pieces"	2012	7	—	—	—	13	—	30	—	3	BPI: Platinum	Fall to Grace
"30 Minute Love Affair"	2012	50	—	—	—	—	—	—	—	42		Fall to Grace
"Never Tear Us Apart"	2012	16	—	—	—	42	—	—	—	18	BPI: Silver	Fall to Grace
"Just Be"	2012	66	—	—	—	—	—	—	—	—	BPI: Silver	Fall to Grace
"Black & Blue"	2013	—	—	—	—	—	—	—	—	—		Fall to Grace
"Can't Rely on You"	2014	10	64	14	—	5	53	34	—	12	BPI: Silver	A Perfect Contradiction
"Only Love Can Hurt Like This"	2014	6	1	14	—	26	— (Note: "Only Love Can Hurt Like This" did not enter the Dutch Single Top 100, but peaked at number nine on the Single Tip chart.)	3	—	5	BPI: 4× Platinum; ARIA: 4× Platinum; BVMI: Gold; RMNZ: 5× Platinum	A Perfect Contradiction
"Trouble with My Baby"	2014	—	—	47	—	—	—	—	—	—		A Perfect Contradiction
"Ready for the Good Life"	2014	68	—	70	—	—	—	—	—	46		A Perfect Contradiction
"Beauty Remains"	2015	—	—	100	—	—	—	—	—	—		A Perfect Contradiction
"Crybaby"	2017	36	—	29	—	—	—	—	—	12	BPI: Silver	The Architect
"Guilty"	2017	— (Note: "Guilty" did not enter the UK Top 100 but peaked at number 57 on the UK Singles Download Chart.)	—	—	—	—	—	—	—	62		The Architect
"'Til I'm Done"	2018	95	—	—	—	—	—	—	—	24		The Architect
"Warrior"	2018	—	—	—	—	—	—	—	—	—		The Architect
"Lullaby" (Note: "Lullaby" also features on Sigala's debut studio album, Brighter Days) (with Sigala)	2018	6	—	16	90	8	32	— (Note: "Lullaby" did not enter the NZ Top 40 Singles Chart, but peaked at number nine on the NZ Heatseeker Singles Chart.)	52	3	BPI: 2× Platinum; RMNZ: Gold	The Architect
"Make Your Own Kind of Music"	2018	28	—	—	—	—	—	—	—	8	BPI: Gold	The Architect
"Loyal"	2018	— (Note: "Loyal" did not enter the UK Top 100 but peaked at number 60 on the UK Singles Download Chart.)	—	—	—	—	—	—	—	57		The Architect
"Mistakes" (with Jonas Blue)	2020	—	—	23	—	—	—	— (Note: "Mistakes" did not enter the NZ Top 40 Singles Chart, but peaked at number 35 on the NZ Hot Singles Chart.)	—	52		Est. 1989
"Better Than This"	2020	— (Note: "Better Than This" did not enter the UK Top 100 but peaked at number 20 on the UK Singles Download Chart.)	—	—	—	—	—	—	—	26		Infinite Things
"Gold"	2020	—	—	—	—	—	—	—	—	—		Infinite Things
"Monster"	2021	—	—	—	—	—	—	—	—	—		Infinite Things
"How You Leave a Man"	2023	— (Note: "How You Leave a Man" did not enter the UK Top 100 but peaked at number 33 on the UK Singles Sales Chart, and number 28 on the UK Singles Downloads Chart.)	—	—	—	—	—	—	—	—		The Glorification of Sadness
"Bad Woman"	2023	—	—	—	—	—	—	—	—	—		The Glorification of Sadness
"Pressure" (featuring Kojey Radical)	2024	—	—	—	—	—	—	—	—	—		The Glorification of Sadness
"Sweatpants"	2024	—	—	—	—	—	—	—	—	—		The Glorification of Sadness
"Gone"	2026	55	—	—	—	—	—	—	—	—		In Full Colour!
"—" denotes single that did not chart or was not released

=== As featured artist ===
Title	Year	Peak chart positions									Certifications	Album
Title	Year	UK	AUS	CRO	GER	IRE	NLD	NZ	SWI	SCO	Certifications	Album
"Keep Moving" (Adam Deacon & Bashy featuring Paloma Faith)	2010	—	—	—	—	—	—	—	—	—		4.3.2.1.: Original Motion Picture Soundtrack and Kreative Koncepts
"Changing" (Sigma featuring Paloma Faith)	2014	1	19	5	87	8	54	9	—	1	BPI: 2× Platinum; ARIA: Gold; RMNZ: Platinum	Life
"Movin' Too Fast" (DJ Spoony featuring Paloma Faith)	2019	—	—	—	—	—	—	—	—	—		Garage Classical
"—" denotes single that did not chart or was not released

=== Promotional singles ===
Title	Year	Album
"Leave While I'm Not Looking"	2014	A Perfect Contradiction
"Falling Down"	2020	Infinite Things
"Last Night on Earth"	2020	Infinite Things
"Christmas Prayer" (with Gregory Porter)	2020	—N/a
"My Sweet Baby"	2023	Chicken Run: Dawn of the Nugget

=== Charity singles ===
Title	Year	Peak chart positions	Certifications	Notes
Title	Year	UK	Certifications	Notes
"I Put a Spell on You" (Shane MacGowan and Friends)	2010	129		To raise funds for the 2010 Haiti earthquake.
"Hard Times" (Plan B featuring Elton John & Paloma Faith)	2011	147		To raise funds for the 2010 Pakistan floods and the 2011 Tōhoku earthquake.
"He Ain't Heavy, He's My Brother" (as part of The Justice Collective)	2012	1	BPI: Gold	To raise funds for various charities associated with the Hillsborough disaster.
"God Only Knows" (BBC Music and friends)	2014	20		Released by BBC Music and featuring several famous musicians.
"Do They Know It's Christmas?" (as part of Band Aid 30)	2014	1	BPI: Gold	To raise funds for the Ebola crisis in Western Africa.
"Bridge over Troubled Water" (as part of Artists for Grenfell)	2017	1	BPI: Gold	To raise money for the families of the victims of the Grenfell Tower fire.
"Silent Night" (with the Pampers #ThankYouMidwife choir)	2018	—		To raise money to the Royal College of Midwives Benevolent Fund for support to midwives in times of need.
"Times Like These" (as part of Live Lounge Allstars)	2020	1		Among various charities worldwide, profits from the single will primarily go to Children in Need and Comic Relief, as well as WHO's COVID-19 Solidarity Response Fund.
"Stop Crying Your Heart Out" (as BBC Radio 2's Allstars)	2020	7		The official 2020 Children in Need single.
"Enjoy Yourself" (Note: "Enjoy Yourself" is included on Faith's sixth studio album, The Glorification of Sadness.)	2024	—		The official 2024 Red Nose Day single.
"—" denotes single that did not chart or was not released

== Music videos ==
Title	Year	Director(s)
"Stone Cold Sober"	2009	Sophie Muller
"New York"	2009	Vaughan Arnell
"Do You Want the Truth or Something Beautiful?"	2009	Chris Sweeney
"Upside Down"	2010	Chris Sweeney
"Smoke & Mirrors"	2010	James Copeman
"Keep Moving"	2010	Nick Mason
"Picking Up the Pieces"	2012	Emil Nava
"30 Minute Love Affair"	2012	Emil Nava
"Never Tear Us Apart"	2012	Anthony Saul and Si Allen
"Just Be"	2012	Emil Nava
"Black & Blue"	2013	Si Allen
"Can't Rely on You"	2014	Paul Gore
"Only Love Can Hurt Like This"	2014	Paul Gore
"Trouble with My Baby"	2014	Paul Gore
"Changing"	2014	Craig Moore
"God Only Knows"	2014	-
"Do They Know It's Christmas?"	2014	Andy Morahan
"Beauty Remains"	2015	George Belfield
"World in Union"	2015	-
"The Crazy Ones"	2015	Barnaby Southcombe
"Crybaby"	2017	Thomas James
"Guilty"	2017	Thomas James
"'Til I'm Done"	2018	Thomas James
"Lullaby"	2018	Craig Moore
"Make Your Own Kind of Music"	2018	Georgia Hudson
"Warrior"	2018	Thomas James
"Loyal"	2018	Jamie Travis
"Mistakes"	2020	Thomas James
"Better Than This"	2020	David Wilson
"Gold"	2020	David Wilson
"Monster"	2021	Yousef
"How You Leave a Man"	2023	Theo Adams

== Other appearances ==
Title	Year	Album
"What's a Girl Gotta Do" (Basement Jaxx featuring Paloma Faith)	2009	Scars
"Sexy Chick (Live from BBC Radio 1's Live Lounge)"	2009	Radio 1's Live Lounge – Volume 4 and The Best of BBC Radio 1's Live Lounge
"It's Christmas (And I Hate You)" (Josh Weller, Paloma Faith, The Arctic Circle Ensemble & The Puffin Voices)	2009	That Fuzzy Feeling EP
"Lola" (Ray Davies with Paloma Faith)	2010	See My Friends
"Forget You (Live from the BRITS)" (Cee Lo Green with Paloma Faith)	2011	Live From the BRITs 2011
"Heart & Sole" (Mikill Pane featuring Paloma Faith)	2012	You Guest It EP
"Feel the Love (Live from BBC Radio 1's Live Lounge)"	2012	BBC Radio 1's Live Lounge 2012
"Something's Got a Hold on Me" (Jools Holland with Paloma Faith)	2012	The Golden Age of Song
"Lost Ones" (Tinie Tempah featuring Paloma Faith)	2013	Demonstration
"Diamonds Are a Girl's Best Friend" (Shirley Bassey featuring Paloma Faith)	2014	Hello Like Before
"You're so Sad" (Nervous Nellie featuring Paloma Faith)	2014	Where the Nightmare Gets In
"Circus of Your Mind"	2015	Finding Neverland (album)
"World in Union"	2015	World in Union: Rugby World Cup 2015, The Official Album
"Ad occhi chiusi (Light in You)" (Marco Mengoni featuring Paloma Faith)	2016	Marco Mengoni Live
"Moving Too Fast" (DJ Spoony feat. Paloma Faith)	2019	Garage Classical
