= Do You Want the Truth or Something Beautiful Tour =

2009–10 concert tour by Paloma Faith

- Tour by Paloma Faith
- Associated album: Do You Want the Truth or Something Beautiful?
- Start date: 16 July 2009
- End date: 10 December 2010
- No. of shows: 68

Paloma Faith concert chronology
- Do You Want the Truth or Something Beautiful Tour (2010); Fall to Grace Tour (2013)

Paloma Faith undertook her first major tour in 2010. The United Kingdom leg of the tour was confirmed on 4 November 2009, when Faith announced that she would visit the United Kingdom and Ireland starting on 17 March 2010. The tour featured songs from Faith's album, Do You Want the Truth or Something Beautiful?. In April 2010, Faith extended her tour for throughout October and November, where she visited a number of different venues.

== Supporting acts ==
- Josh Weller
- La Shark
- Bashy
- Alan Pownell
- Eliza Doolittle

== Sample setlist (March 2010) ==
1. "Smoke & Mirrors"
2. "Stone Cold Sober"
3. "Romance Is Dead"
4. "Broken Doll"
5. "Do You Want the Truth or Something Beautiful"
6. "God Bless This Child" (Billie Holiday cover)
7. "Sexy Minx" (Cover of David Guetta's Sexy Bitch)
8. "Stargazer"
9. "You Never Give Me Your Money" (The Beatles cover)
10. "Love Ya"
11. "Upside Down"
12. "Play On"

Encore

13. "At Last"
14. (Etta James Cover)
14. "New York"

== Tour dates ==
Below is a full list of tour dates.

Date	City	Country	Venue
Europe
16 July 2009	Suffolk	United Kingdom	Latitude Festival
19 July 2009	Weston-super-Mare	United Kingdom	T4 on the Beach
1 August 2009	Standon	United Kingdom	Standon Calling Festival
11 September 2009	Isle of Wight	United Kingdom	Bestival
14 September 2009	Glasgow	United Kingdom	King Tut's Wah Wah Hut
15 September 2009	Manchester	United Kingdom	Ruby Lounge
17 September 2009	London	United Kingdom	Scala
24 October 2009	London	United Kingdom	Kentish Town Forum
2 November 2009	Sydney	Australia	The Oxford Art Factory
16 November 2009	Southsea	United Kingdom	Wedgewood Rooms
17 November 2009	Liverpool	United Kingdom	O2 Academy Liverpool
18 November 2009	London	United Kingdom	Union Chapel
19 November 2009	Liverpool	United Kingdom	O2 Academy Liverpool
22 November 2009	Southsea	United Kingdom	Wedgewood Rooms
23 November 2009	London	United Kingdom	KOKO
28 November 2009	Berlin	Germany	Postbahnhof am Ostbahnhof
29 November 2009	Hamburg	Germany	Grünspan
2 December 2009	Paris	France	Nouveau Casino
3 December 2009	Birmingham	United Kingdom	O2 Academy Birmingham
11 February 2010	London	United Kingdom	Jazz Cafe
26 February 2010	Warsaw	Poland	Palladium
5 March 2010	Zürich	Switzerland	Masott
7 March 2010	Cologne	Germany	Luxor Club
8 March 2010	Hamburg	Germany	Gruenspan Club
9 March 2010	Berlin	Germany	Postbahnhof Club
10 March 2010	Munich	Germany	59:1 Club
12 March 2010	Amsterdam	The Netherlands	Paradiso
14 March 2010	London	United Kingdom	KOKO
16 March 2010	Dublin	Ireland	Vicar Street
17 March 2010	Glasgow	United Kingdom	O2 Academy Glasgow
19 March 2010	Manchester	United Kingdom	Manchester Academy
20 March 2010	Leeds	United Kingdom	O2 Academy Leeds
21 March 2010	Newcastle	United Kingdom	O2 Academy Newcastle
23 March 2010	Cambridge	United Kingdom	Cambridge Corn Exchange
24 March 2010	Birmingham	United Kingdom	O2 Academy Birmingham
25 March 2010	Southampton	United Kingdom	Guildhall
26 March 2010	Bristol	United Kingdom	O2 Academy Bristol
28 March 2010	Oxford	United Kingdom	O2 Academy Oxford
29 March 2010	London	United Kingdom	O2 Shepherd's Bush Empire
30 March 2010	London	United Kingdom	O2 Shepherd's Bush Empire
31 March 2010	London	United Kingdom	O2 Shepherd's Bush Empire
28 April 2010	Cheltenham	United Kingdom	Cheltenham Town Hall
3 May 2010	Cheltenham	United Kingdom	Cheltenham Town Hall
19 May 2010	Liverpool	United Kingdom	Philharmonic Hall
20 May 2010	Sheffield	United Kingdom	O2 Academy Sheffield
11 June 2010	Newport	United Kingdom	Isle of Wight Festival
15 June 2010	Stockholm	Sweden	Love 2010 Festival at Skeppsbron
18 June 2010	Seinajoki	Finland	Tornavansaari
23 June 2010	Pilton	United Kingdom	Glastonbury Festival
7 July 2010	London	United Kingdom	iTunes Festival
9 July 2010	Kinross	United Kingdom	T in the Park
15 July 2010	Dublin	Ireland	Iveagh Gardens
16 July 2010	London	United Kingdom	Lovebox at Victoria Park
17 July 2010	London	United Kingdom	Lovebox at Victoria Park
18 July 2010	London	United Kingdom	Lovebox at Victoria Park
23 July 2010	Lucerne	Switzerland	Blue Balls Festival
8 August 2010	Herefordshire	United Kingdom	Eastnor Castle Deer Park
21 August 2010	Chelmsford	United Kingdom	V Festival
22 August 2010	Weston-under-Lizard	United Kingdom	V Festival
30 October 2010	Newcastle	United Kingdom	Newcastle City Hall
31 October 2010	Manchester	United Kingdom	Manchester Apollo
1 November 2010	Wolverhampton	United Kingdom	Wolverhampton Civic Hall
2 November 2010	Edinburgh	United Kingdom	Edinburgh Corn Exchange
4 November 2010	Plymouth	United Kingdom	Plymouth Pavilions
5 November 2010	Leicester	United Kingdom	De Montfort Hall
7 November 2010	Portsmouth	United Kingdom	Portsmouth Guildhall
8 November 2010	London	United Kingdom	Hammersmith Apollo
17 November 2010	London	United Kingdom	Royal Albert Hall
1 December 2010	London	United Kingdom	HMV Forum
10 December 2010	London	United Kingdom	The Barbican Centre
