= Gone =

Gone may refer to:

== Grammar ==
- Gone, the past participle of go (verb)
  - Have gone or have been, contrasting verb forms in some contexts

== Arts, entertainment, and media ==
=== Film ===
- Gone, a 2002 a thriller written, directed by and starring Tim Chey
- Gone, a 2006 American short starring Amanda Noret
- Gone (2007 film), a British/Australian thriller
- Gone, a 2007 American short starring Barbara Tarbuck
- Gone, a 2007 Canadian short starring Cory Monteith
- Gone, a 2009 American short starring Rafael Morais
- Gone, a 2011 TV movie featuring Molly Parker
- Gone (2012 film), an American thriller starring Amanda Seyfried
- Gone (2021 film), a Nigerian thriller

=== Literature ===
- Gone (Hayder novel), written by Mo Hayder & winner of the 2012 Edgar Award
- Gone (Kellerman novel), a 2006 Alex Delaware novel by Jonathan Kellerman
- Gone (novel series), a series of young-adult novels by Michael Grant, or the first novel in the series
- "Gone", a 1996 story by John Crowley which won the Locus Award for Best Short Story
- Gone, a 2010 radio play featuring Danny Lee Wynter

=== Music ===
==== Bands and labels ====
- Gone (band), an American punk-based instrumental rock band
- Gone Records, an American record label

==== Albums ====
- Gone (Beasts of Bourbon album), 1997
- Gone (Dwight Yoakam album) or the title song, "Gone (That'll Be Me)", 1995
- Gone (Mono album) or the title song, 2007
- Gone (Red album), 2017
- Gone (Vacationer album) or the title song, 2012
- Gone or the title song, by Bill Madden, 2006
- Gone, by Entwine, 2001
- Gone or the title song, by Keren DeBerg, 2004
- Gone, an EP by Jack & Jack, 2017

==== Songs ====
- "Gone" (Aaliyah and Tank song), 2025
- "Gone" (Afrojack song), 2016
- "Gone" (Bebe Rexha song), 2014
- "Gone" (Charli XCX and Christine and the Queens song), 2019
- "Gone" (Coldrain song), 2015
- "Gone!" (The Cure song), 1996
- "Gone" (Dierks Bentley song), 2020
- "Gone" (Ferlin Husky song), 1957
- "Gone" (JR JR song), 2015
- "Gone" (Kanye West song), 2005
- "Gone" (Kelly Clarkson song), 2004
- "Gone" (Lasgo song), 2009
- "Gone" (Montgomery Gentry song), 2004
- "Gone" (Nelly song), 2011
- "Gone" (NSYNC song), 2001
- "Gone" (Pearl Jam song), 2006
- "Gone" (Rosé song), 2021
- "Gone" (Switchfoot song), 2003
- "Gone" (TobyMac song), 2004
- "Gone" (U2 song), 1997
- "Gone" (The Weeknd song), 2011
- "Gone", by Alexis Jordan
- "Gone", by …And You Will Know Us by the Trail of Dead from X: The Godless Void and Other Stories
- "Gone", by Asking Alexandria from The Black
- "Gone", by Atreyu from The Beautiful Dark of Life
- "Gone", by Bad Wolves from Dear Monsters
- "Gone", by Bazzi from Cosmic
- "Gone", by Beach Bunny from Emotional Creature
- "Gone", by Believer from Dimensions
- "Gone", by Ben Folds from Rockin' the Suburbs
- "Gone", by Benjamin Clementine from At Least for Now
- "Gone", by Bone Thugs-n-Harmony from Uni5: The World's Enemy
- "Gone", by the Bouncing Souls from How I Spent My Summer Vacation
- "Gone", by Built to Spill from You in Reverse
- "Gone", by BWO from Prototype
- "Gone", by the Comsat Angels from Sleep No More
- "Gone", by Crooked X from Crooked X
- "Gone", by Dannii Minogue from Club Disco
- "Gone", by Daughtry from Daughtry
- "Gone", by Diana Ross from Take Me Higher
- "Gone", by Fuel from Angels & Devils
- "Gone", by the Head and the Heart from Let's Be Still
- "Gone", by Ho Yeow Sun
- "Gone", by Jack Johnson from On and On
- "Gone!", by James Otto from Days of Our Lives
- "Gone", by Jerry Cantrell from Degradation Trip Volumes 1 & 2
- "Gone", by Kaskade from Redux EP 002
- "Gone", by Katatonia from Discouraged Ones
- "Gone", by Kelly Rowland from Talk a Good Game
- "Gone", by Liam Gallagher from Why Me? Why Not.
- "Gone", by Lianne La Havas
- "Gone", by M83 from Dead Cities, Red Seas & Lost Ghosts
- "Gone", by Machine Gun Kelly from General Admission
- "Gone", by Madonna from Music
- "Gone", by Matt Simons from Pieces
- "Gone", by McBusted from McBusted
- "Gone", by Miss May I from Rise of the Lion
- "Gone", by Moby from Baby Monkey
- "Gone", by Noa Kirel, 2023
- "Gone", by Paloma Faith from In Full Colour!
- "Gone", by Paradise Lost from Believe in Nothing
- "Gone", by the Script from Satellites
- "Gone", by Sevendust from Seasons
- "Gone", by Shirley Bassey
- "Gone", by the Tea Party from Triptych
- "Gone", by Thelma Houston from Breakwater Cat
- "Gone", by Thirteen Senses from The Invitation
- "Gone", by Twelve Foot Ninja from Vengeance
- "Gone", by Twice from Between 1&2
- "Gone", by Vérité

=== Television ===
==== Series ====
- Gone (2017 TV series), a 2017–2018 internationally produced police procedural
- The Gone, a 2023–2024 New Zealand crime drama
- Gone (2026 TV series), a British crime drama

==== Episodes ====
- "Gone" (The 4400)
- "Gone" (Buffy the Vampire Slayer)
- "Gone" (Law & Order: Criminal Intent)
- "Gone" (Lie to Me)
- "Gone" (NCIS)
- "Gone" (Smallville)
- "Gone" (Spaced)
- "Gone" (SpongeBob SquarePants)
- "Gone" (Young Americans)

== Other uses ==
- 410 Gone, an HTTP status code
- Euphemism for saying that one has just died

== See also ==
- Go (disambiguation)
- Gone, Gone, Gone (disambiguation)
- Gonne (disambiguation)
