= Better Than This =

Better Than This may refer to:

- Better Than This (album), a 1998 album by The Normals
- "Better Than This" (song), a 2020 song by Paloma Faith
- "Better Than This", a 2009 song by Keane from Perfect Symmetry
- "Better Than This", a 2022 song by Lauv from All 4 Nothing
- "Better Than This", a 2024 song by Lizzy McAlpine from Older
