= I'd Die for You =

I'd Die for You may refer to:

- "I'd Die for You", a 1986 song by Bon Jovi from Slippery When Wet
- "I'd Die for You", a 2020 song by Paloma Faith from Infinite Things
