= Gonne =

Gonne may refer to:

- A medieval hand cannon
- Gonne (surname), a surname
- Gonne Pilcher (1890–1966), British judge
- Gonne Małe, a village in Poland

== See also ==
- Gone (disambiguation)
