= Do You Want the Truth or Something Beautiful? =

Studio album by Paloma Faith
- Released: 28 September 2009
- Recorded: 2008–2009
- Studios: AIR Studios, Angel Studios, Hug Studio, Shelter Studio (London); Echo Studio (Los Angeles); Lighthouse Studio, Stureparken Studio (Stockholm); Ian Barter's Studio (Whitchurch Hill)
- Genre: Soul
- Length: 37:11
- Label: Epic
- Producers: Greg Kurstin; Patrick Byrne Blair; Mackichan; Steve Robson; Ian Barter; Ed Harcourt; Andrew Nicholas Love; Jos Hartvig Jorgensen; Jodi Marr; George Noriega; Rob Wells; Jörgen Elofsson; Pär Westerlund; Samuel Dixon

Paloma Faith chronology
Do You Want the Truth or Something Beautiful? (2009)	Fall to Grace (2012)

Singles from Do You Want the Truth or Something Beautiful?
- 1. "Stone Cold Sober" Released: 15 June 2009; 2. "New York" Released: 10 September 2009; 3. "Do You Want the Truth or Something Beautiful?" Released: 21 December 2009; 4. "Upside Down" Released: 15 March 2010; 5. "Smoke & Mirrors" Released: 31 October 2010

Do You Want the Truth or Something Beautiful? is the debut studio album by English recording artist Paloma Faith. It was released on 28 September 2009 by Epic Records. Its first two singles from the album, "Stone Cold Sober" and "New York", both peaked within the top twenty in the United Kingdom. The album spawned three more singles: "Do You Want the Truth or Something Beautiful?", "Upside Down" and "Smoke & Mirrors".

The album received mixed reviews from critics. Since its release, the album has spent 106 weeks on the UK Albums Chart and peaked at number 9. It was announced on 1 March 2013 that the album had been certified 2× Platinum with sales exceeding 600,000 copies. To promote the album Faith embarked her first concert Do You Want the Truth or Something Beautiful Tour on 12 February 2010 which visited Europe.

== Background ==
During her time at college, Faith worked in a pub where the manager asked her to front his band, which they later called Paloma and the Penetrators. During a performance with the band at a cabaret show, Faith was scouted by an A&R man from Epic Records, who invited Faith to sing for the manager of the label. Twenty minutes into the audition, Faith asked the manager to turn his phone off and when he refused, she walked out. Epic A&R Joanna Charrington told HitQuarters "When she played a showcase for us it was clear that she was a star but the material was a bit generic. She didn't have the hit songs". The label executives decided not to pursue it any further at that stage.

Charrington continued to regularly check Faith's MySpace page "to see if she had something that had a special direction or sound." After several months her attention was eventually piqued by "Broken Doll", which she thought was a well-crafted song with a "fantastic chorus and brilliant lyrics." Charrington told Epic managing director Nick Raphael "I think we should get this girl back in. She sounds like she is getting it now. We can help her get the songs." Faith revealed in an interview that the manager called her and offered her a contract saying he had seen many acts since and none had been as memorable as her.

== Release and promotion ==
=== Singles ===
"Stone Cold Sober" was released on 15 June 2009 and entered the UK chart at number 17. The accompanying video was directed by the English music video director Sophie Muller. This song is featured in the Rimmel London commercial for the MAX lashes product, and in Castle promo on SBS 6. "New York", the second single from the album, was released on 10 September 2009. Digital Spy gave the song 3/5 stars and a less positive rating than "Stone Cold Sober". "New York" debuted on the UK Singles Chart at 21, the next week it fell to 31 and was expected to fall quickly out of the charts by most, but the next week it rose 16 places to 15, which became its peak position. "Do You Want the Truth or Something Beautiful?", the title track to the album, was released on 21 December 2009 as the third single. Digital Spy praised the song as an elegant ballad with poetic lyrics and a richly atmospheric charm. The song entered the UK Singles Chart on 2 January 2010 at number 90. The song also peaked at number 64.

"Upside Down" was released on 15 March 2010, as the album's fourth single. The accompanying video was directed by Chris Sweeney who directed the video for her previous single, "Do You Want the Truth or Something Beautiful?". Before the single was released, Digital Spy said that "Upside Down backs up Faith's claim to have absorbed influences from the pre-rock 'n' roll era, mixing up a '50s dance hall vibe with her ever-present soul croon". Charles Decant of Ozap called the single "the more playful title on the album". On 14 March 2010, "Upside Down" debuted on the UK Singles Chart at number 89, on downloads alone. The following week, the single climbed to number 58, which was followed by a further climb of 3 on 28 March 2010 to its current peak at number 55. A new version of "New York" featuring rapper Ghostface Killah was released on 1 August. It peaked at number 15 on the UK Singles Chart and received mixed responses. "Smoke & Mirrors", was released as the fifth and final single from the album. During an interview on Something for the Weekend on 15 August 2010, Faith confirmed "Smoke & Mirrors" would be the final single from the album, and that she would be filming the video "very soon". At Hylands Park, as part of the 2010 V Festival, she announced that filming for the video has been completed. The video premiered on 11 September, on Faith's official Facebook page. It was released on 31 October 2010, added to Radio 1's B Playlis, and peaked at number 140 in the UK.

=== Tour ===
Paloma Faith went on her first major tour in 2010. The UK leg of the tour was confirmed on 4 November 2009, when Faith announced that she would visit the UK and Ireland starting on 17 March 2010. In April 2010, Faith extended her tour throughout October and November. She was supported by Eliza Doolittle, Bashy, Josh Weller, LA Shark and Alan Pownell.

== Critical reception ==
Professional ratings
Aggregate scores
Source	Rating
Metacritic	51/100
Review scores
Source	Rating
AllMusic	3/5 stars
BBC Music	(positive)
The Guardian	2/5 stars
The Independent	4/5 stars
NME	1.5/5 stars
Sputnikmusic	4/5 stars

Do You Want the Truth or Something Beautiful? received generally mixed reviews from music critics. In a BBC Music review Mike Diver stated, "Faith's voice is the first element of these sumptuous arrangements to strike, its idiosyncratic ticks and sharp inflections separating her from the pack in the same way as Duffy – but while the Welsh star's vocals can lack a sincere conveyance of the emotions behind a song, Faith's sentiments are never in doubt, even on the surprisingly underwhelming (in context) singles "Stone Cold Sober" and "New York". The former sounds designed to soundtrack an advertisement – successfully, as it turns out – and the latter's lamenting loses some of its edge when one's unsure if the New York in question is a rival lover or, literally, the city that never sleeps. Whichever it is, it's stolen our protagonist's lover away".

Andy Gill of The Independent said: "In the case of this impressive debut album, that might refer to her fabricated Amy Winehouse persona, which is a touch too smoothly effected to ring entirely true. It's there right from the off with the Amy/Duffy retro-soul stylings of "Stone Cold Sober"; while her claim in "Broken Doll" that she's "damaged goods" seems that bit too eager to echo Amy's admission "I told you I was trouble". But Paloma deals in similarly grand, melodramatic emotions in songs such as "Smoke And Mirrors", "New York" and the title-track, wheeling out Spectorian tubular bells and keening string glissandi to evoke the depths of her emotional catastrophe". Robyn Burrows of Contact Music concluded "Musically diverse and well produced; it is a polished diamond. Faith's captivating vocals and huge range keep you hooked throughout and encourage you to press repeat as soon as the album ends." He only found fault in the shortness of the album.

Maddy Costa of The Guardian gave an overwhelmingly negative review, contrasting Faith's image to her "conventional" music: while some elements "hint at the performer Faith purports to be ... her protestations of otherness ring hollow when her music is so specious and bland". NME described the album with the tagline "Burlesque pop with less weight than a feather fan." AllMusic, while generally favorable of the album, still finds that "Faith's tracks seem too glossy and processed, as if an executive has tried too hard to make many of these tracks way too commercial", believing that said refinement goes against the spirit that Faith is trying to convey: "The overall mood of the album feels a bit broken and battered, but comes off too polished to let that feeling drive home."

== Commercial performance ==
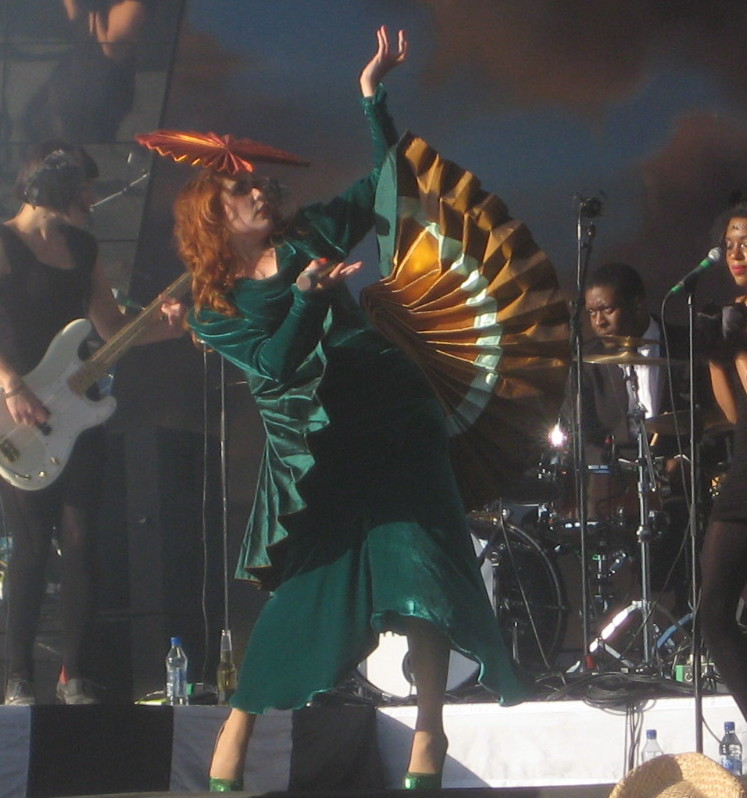
Faith performing at the 2010 Lovebox Festival. The dress Faith wore at the event was later auctioned off for Choose Love to aid the European migrant crisis in 2015.

Do You Want the Truth or Something Beautiful? peaked at number 9 in the UK. In just under 2 months of the album being released, it received a Gold certification with sales over 100,000, later being certified as Platinum. The album stayed in the UK top 100 albums chart for 62 weeks, in its 63rd week it fell out the top 100 albums to no. 110, however the week after charted back into the top 100. On 9 January 2011, the album made number 41, and has spent a total of 73 weeks on the chart. On 1 March 2013, the album was certified double-platinum, denoting sales of over 600,000 copies.

The album had moderate success elsewhere, it charted within the top 30 in Ireland, where it charted at 26. Do You Want the Truth or Something Beautiful? charted at number 3 in Scotland. In Switzerland the album charted again, within the top 40, where it charted at number 39. In the Netherlands the album also charted at number 50. In Finland, the album charted at number 46 and in Poland the album charted at number 39.

== Track listing ==
Do You Want the Truth or Something Beautiful track listing
No.	Title	Writer(s)	Producer(s)	Length
1.	"Stone Cold Sober"	Paloma Faith; Patrick Byrne; Blair Mackichan	Byrne; Mackichan	2:54
2.	"Smoke & Mirrors"	Faith; Steve Robson; Alison Clarkson	Robson	3:06
3.	"Broken Doll"	Faith; Ian Barter	Barter	4:08
4.	"Do You Want the Truth or Something Beautiful?"	Faith; Ed Harcourt	Harcourt	4:36
5.	"Upside Down"	Faith; Andrew Nicholas Love; Jos Hartvig Jorgensen; Belle Sara Humble	Love; Jorgensen; Jamie Reddington^{[a]}; Jay Reynolds^{[a]}	3:09
6.	"Romance Is Dead"	Faith; Jodi Marr; George Noriega; Rob Wells	Greg Kurstin	3:04
7.	"New York"	Faith; Marr	Marr; Noriega; Wells	3:40
8.	"Stargazer"	Faith; Jörgen Elofsson	Elofsson; Pär Westerlund	3:45
9.	"My Legs Are Weak"	Faith; Samuel Dixon	Dixon	4:49
10.	"Play On"	Faith; Robson	Robson	4:04
Total length:				37:11

Do You Want the Truth or Something Beautiful? iTunes bonus tracks
No.	Title	Writer(s)	Producer(s)	Length
11.	"Press Lightly"	Faith; Dixon	Dixon	3:33
12.	"Stone Cold Sober" (Live at the ICA (Video))	Faith; Byrne; Mackichan		3:27
13.	"New York" (Live at the ICA (Video))	Faith; Marr		4:07

- ^{^[a]} signifies a co-producer.

== Personnel ==
Adapted from AllMusic.

- Paloma Faith – main vocals, background vocals, handclapping
- Carol Riley – background vocals
- Dee Dee Wilde – background vocals
- Donna Allen – background vocals
- Patricia Scott – background vocals
- Emily McEwan – background vocals
- Joy Malcolm – background vocals
- Brian Jones – background vocals
- Edith Langley – background vocals
- Marcus Johnson – background vocals
- Subrina McCalla – background vocals
- Venessa Yeboah – background vocals
- Ian Pitter – background vocals
- Jodi Marr – brass arrangement, producer, background vocals
- Lawrence Johnson – background vocals vocal arrangement
- Rosie Langley – violin, background vocals, string quartet
- Robin Bailey – reid background vocals
- Seye Adelekan – guitar, background vocals
- David Paul Campbell – brass arrangement
- Sarah Tuke – violin
- Sato Kotono – viola
- Úna Palliser – viola
- Laura Stanford – violin
- Fiona Brice – violin
- Jesse Murphy – violin
- Luke Potashnick – guitar
- Amy Langley – string – Quartet
- Ruthie Phoenix – saxophone
- Llinos Richards – cello
- Harriet Wiltshire – cello
- Matthew Waer – upright bass
- Steve Robson – keyboards, string arrangements, instrumentation, producer, programming
- Jeremy Stacey – percussion, drums
- Andy Newmark – drums
- Felix Bloxsom – drums
- Ali Friend – bass
- Jim Hunt – horn
- Patrick Byrne – guitar, keyboards, percussion
- Blair Mackichan – guitar, handclapping
- George Noriega – keyboards, brass arrangement
- Pete Davis – bass, drum programming
- Ben Castle – clarinet, tenor saxophone
- Greg Kurstin – guitar, keyboards
- The London Session – orchestra strings
- Nichol Thompson – horn
- Samuel Dixon – piano, bass, celeste, electric guitar, toy piano, vibraphone
- Dominic Glover – trumpet, horn, horn arrangements
- Ed Harcourt – guitar, wurlitzer, piano, percussion
- Hadrian Garrard – trumpet
- Leo Abrahams – guitar
- Rob Wells – piano, keyboards, brass arrangement
- Joe Walters – horn
- Laura Anstee – cello
- Per Ekdahl – string arrangements
- Karl Brazil – drums
- Trevor Mires – trombone
- Ryan Granville Martin – drums
- Daniel Pherson – string and keyboard engineer
- Darren Heelis – assistant
- Jamie Reddington – producer
- Gandalf Roudette Muschamp – engineer
- Jossip Serrano – engineer
- Jon Bailey – engineer
- Niall Acott – engineer
- Andreas Unge – string engineer
- Simon Hale – conductor, string arrangements
- Oliver Kraus – strings, string arrangements, string engineer
- Jay Reynolds – producer
- George Noriega – keyboards, producer, brass arrangement, programming
- Blair Mackichan – producer, engineer
- Perry Mason – orchestra leader
- Patrick Byrne – programming, producer, engineer
- Carlos Alvarez – engineer
- Richard Flack – engineer
- Steve Fitzmaurice – arranger, mixing
- James Stone – assistant
- Steve Fitzmaurice – arranger, mixing
- Greg Kurstin – programming, producer, engineer
- Samuel Dixon – producer, engineer, programming
- Ed Harcourt – producer
- Rob Wells – producer, programming
- Ian Barter – producer
- Olga Fitzroy – assistant
- Eamonn Hughes – hair stylist
- Moritz Junge – stylist
- Finlay MacKay – photography
- Petra Storrs – set design

== Charts ==
=== Weekly charts ===
Chart (2009–2010)	Peak position
Dutch Albums (Album Top 100)	50
Finnish Albums (Suomen virallinen lista)	33
French Albums (SNEP)	192
Irish Albums (IRMA)	26
Polish Albums (ZPAV)	39
Scottish Albums (Official Charts)	12
Swiss Albums (Schweizer Hitparade)	37
UK Albums (Official Charts)	9

=== Year-end charts ===
Chart (2009)	Position
UK Albums (OCC)	113
Chart (2010)	Position
UK Albums (OCC)	42

== Certifications ==
Certifications for Do You Want the Truth or Something Beautiful?
Region	Certification	Certified units/sales
United Kingdom (BPI)	2× Platinum	744,751

== Release history ==
Do You Want the Truth or Something Beautiful? release history
Region	Date	Format
United Kingdom	28 September 2009	CD; digital download
United Kingdom	29 November 2019	Vinyl
