= Gonne (surname) =

Gonne is a surname of unclear origin. It has been purposed to be derived from English, Scottish, Norse, Irish, and Manx surnames.

Notable people with this surname include:

- Friedrich Gonne (1813–1906), German painter
- Iseult Gonne (1866–1953), daughter of Maud Gonne
- Maud Gonne (1866–1953), English-born Irish revolutionary
- Michael Gonne (1899–1918), British flying ace
