= Shanika Warren-Markland =

British actress

Shanika Warren-Markland (born 10 March 1987) is a British actress. She is known for her roles in More Than Love and 4.3.2.1.

== Early life ==
Warren-Markland was raised in West London, She attended St. Mary's Catholic School in South London. At the age of thirteen, she attended a Youth Theatre group at the Royal National Theatre, where she developed her skills in reading and interpreting scripts. Warren-Markland joined the Young Blood Theatre in West London.

== Career ==
Warren-Markland began her career in television by playing the lead role of Lillie in Channel 4 program More Than Love, and then went on to secure roles on BBC favourites Holby City and Spooks at the young age of sixteen. Warren-Markland was signed to the BWH Agency after being spotted at her Young Blood theatre classes.

Warren-Markland received her first feature film role playing the character Kayla in BAFTA award-winning director Noel Clarke's drama ‘Adulthood’. Continuing her work with Clarke, she followed her previous work with the co-lead role in film 4.3.2.1. playing the role of Kerrys. Warren-Markland went on to film the role of Ashleigh in British horror ‘Demons Never Die’, and also played the character Langston in the American film ‘The Skinny'. Warren-Markland appeared in the British thriller flick ‘Victim’, in which she played Charmaine, which was released in June 2012.

Gone Too Far!, in which Warren-Markland played the role of Armani, was screened at the Toronto Film Festival in 2014.

In June 2022, her play Barbie Comes to Tea was performed by the Talawa Theatre Company.

== Filmography ==
=== Television ===
| Year | Title | Role | Notes |
|---|---|---|---|
| 2005 | Holby City | Hayley Kent | Episode: The Honeymoon Is Over |
| 2006 | Spooks | Sophie Brewster | Episode: #5.4...Sophie Brewster |

=== Film ===
| Year | Title | Role | Notes |
|---|---|---|---|
| 2008 | Adulthood | Kayla | |
| 2010 | 4.3.2.1. | Kerrys | |
| 2011 | Fedz | Ty | |
| 2011 | Demons Never Die | Ashleigh | |
| 2012 | The Skinny | Langston | |
| 2012 | Victim | Charmaine | |
| 2012 | Illegal Activity | Natalie | |
| 2012 | Omar | Belle | Short film |
| 2013 | Gone Too Far | Armani | |
| 2016 | Brotherhood | Kayla | |
| 2017 | Rive | Jennifer | Short film |
| 2022 | Smash and Grab | Donna | Short film |
