= Gone, Gone, Gone =

Gone, Gone, Gone may refer to:

- "Gone, Gone, Gone", song by Collins & Harlan, 1904
- "Gone, Gone, Gone", song in the George Gershwin opera Porgy and Bess, 1935
- "Gone, Gone, Gone", song by Carl Perkins from Dance Album of Carl Perkins, 1957
- Gone Gone Gone (album), a 1964 album by The Everly Brothers, or the title track
- "Gone, Gone, Gone" (Bad Company song), 1979
- "Gone, Gone, Gone", song by Echo & the Bunnymen from their 1990 album Reverberation
- "Gone Gone Gone", song by Hoobastank from Fornever, 2009
- "Gone, Gone, Gone", song by Turnpike Troubadours from Goodbye Normal Street, 2012
- "Gone, Gone, Gone" (True Blood), a 2012 episode of the American TV series True Blood
- "Gone, Gone, Gone" (Phillip Phillips song), 2013
- "Gone Gone Gone" (Madonna song), a 2025 song by Madonna from Veronica Electronica
- "Gone Gone Gone" (David Guetta, Teddy Swims and Tones and I song), 2025
- Gone, Gone, Gone, a 2012 novel by Hannah Moskowitz
- "My Girl (Gone, Gone, Gone)", 1981 song by Chilliwack

== See also ==
- "She's Gone, Gone, Gone", a 1965 single by American country music artist Lefty Frizzell
