= Mistakes (Jonas Blue and Paloma Faith song) =

Single by Jonas Blue and Paloma Faith

from the album Est. 1989
- Released: 28 February 2020
- Recorded: 2019
- Length: 3:06
- Label: Positiva; Virgin EMI
- Songwriters: Paloma Faith; Uzoechi Emenike; James Norton; Guy James Robin; Aaron Zuckerman
- Producers: Jonas Blue; Aaron Zuckerman

Jonas Blue singles chronology
"Billboard" (2019)	"Mistakes" (2020)	"Naked" (2020)

Paloma Faith singles chronology
"I've Gotta Be Me" (2019)	"Mistakes" (2020)	"Better Than This" (2020)

"Mistakes" is a song by English DJ and record producer Jonas Blue and English singer-songwriter Paloma Faith. The song was released on 28 February 2020 by Positiva and Virgin EMI. The song was written by Paloma Faith, Uzoechi Emenike, James Norton, Guy James Robin and Aaron Zuckerman.

== Background ==
Talking about the song, Jonas Blue said, "'Mistakes' is such a special one for me, I've wanted to work with Paloma for a long time, and this just connected the dots for us to be able to collaborate in a perfect way. I'm happy I managed to get some influences in there from my UK house and garage upbringing too." Paloma Faith said, "I feel so excited about 'Mistakes'. I am a huge fan of MNEK who co-wrote the song and also of the dance power of Jonas. I can't help but move to this tune. It's a banger!"

== Music video ==
A music video to accompany the release of "Mistakes" was first released onto YouTube on 16 March 2020.

== Track listing ==
Digital download and stream
No.	Title	Length
1.	"Mistakes"	3:06

Digital download and stream – club mix
No.	Title	Length
1.	"Mistakes" (Club Mix)	4:00

Digital download and stream – Paul Woolford remix
No.	Title	Length
1.	"Mistakes" (Paul Woolford Remix)	3:27

== Charts ==
Chart (2020)	Peak position
Belgium (Ultratip Bubbling Under Wallonia)	47
Croatia (HRT)	23
Czech Republic (Rádio – Top 100)	72
New Zealand Hot Singles (RMNZ)	35

== Release history ==
Region	Date	Format	Label
United Kingdom	28 February 2020	Digital download; streaming	Positiva; Virgin EMI
