= Infinite Things =

Studio album by Paloma Faith
- Released: 13 November 2020
- Recorded: 2018–2020
- Length: 47:08
- Label: Sony UK
- Producers: Charlie Handsome; Ed Harcourt; Grades; Jamie Hartman; Jordan Riley; Mark Crew; Nate "Detonate" Ledwidge; Patrick Wimberly; Starsmith; Steve Mac; Styalz Fuego; Tre Jean-Marie

Paloma Faith chronology
The Architect (2017)	Infinite Things (2020)	The Glorification of Sadness (2024)

Singles from Infinite Things
- 1. "Better Than This" Released: 5 September 2020; 2. "Gold" Released: 29 October 2020; 3. "Monster" Released: 7 May 2021

Infinite Things is the fifth studio album by British singer Paloma Faith, released through Sony Music on 13 November 2020. It was supported by the singles "Better Than This", "Gold," and "Monster".

Infinite Things received mixed reviews from critics, with praise for its emotional depth but some criticism of its reliance on mainstream pop conventions. Much of the record was written during the COVID-19 lockdown, which Faith described as a period of creative renewal. Lyrically, it explores themes of love, sickness, and loss, and features contributions from writers including MNEK, Josef Salvat, and Sigrid.

== Background ==
Faith's previous studio album The Architect became her first album to reach number one on the UK Albums Chart. Almost a year later, she released a special edition of the album, named the Zeitgeist Edition, containing other songs that were made during the making of the songs from the standard album. Aside from her album, she also became a figure for automobile manufacturing company Škoda, recording two covers "Make Your Own Kind of Music" and "I've Gotta Be Me" for two of their adverts that ran in 2018 and 2019, respectively. At the end of 2019, she said she would like to release a new album next year.

In early 2020, she released the song "Mistakes" in collaboration with tropical house record producer Jonas Blue, which sparked the first rumours on possibly releasing an album. She talked about the song, saying "I feel so excited about 'Mistakes'. I am a huge fan of MNEK who co-wrote the song and also of the dance power of Jonas. I can't help but move to this tune. It's a banger!" Just before announcing the album in September 2020, she revealed on her social media that she was pregnant with her second child with her current partner Leyman Lahcine, with whom she already had a three-year-old daughter.

Paloma wrote most of the songs for Infinite Things before the COVID-19 pandemic swept the world. Then we went into lockdown, and she ripped them all up and started afresh. She spent her downtime creating, learning to engineer her own music and just thinking about the world. The enforced downtime was creatively fruitful and taught her that she had been on a sort of conveyor belt of music and promo. The lockdown gave her the space to take stock of her frenetic career, and decide what is meaningful to her. She is emerging from lockdown with a new sense of her priorities which has seen her reconnect with her roots steeped in creativity.

— a Paloma Faith representative in a press release.

She announced the album under the title Infinite Things on 25 September 2020 and revealed that because of the COVID-19 pandemic, she learned how to engineer the entirety of the record before she penned it to be released and nearly went as far as scrapping it and starting all over again from scratch. She also revealed that, as well as exploring relationships and love, the record is also reflective in topics of sickness and loss. Faith has also worked with a host of songwriters on the album, including Faouzia, MNEK and Josef Salvat. Sigrid also wrote a song on the album and is the only one that wasn't written by Faith herself, as stated on iTunes.

== Promotion ==
=== Singles ===
The album's lead single, "Better Than This" was released on 5 September 2020, along with an accompanying music video, directed by David Wilson, published onto YouTube a few days after. Faith described the song as one of "enduring love" in a time of violence. "Gold" was made the album's second single on 29 October 2020. The song is accompanied by a video filmed in Hackney, which sees Paloma using an abandoned building site as the stage for a dramatic performance alongside a choir and a host of dancers. "Monster" was made the album's third single on 7 May 2021. The official music video was released on the same day.

=== Promotional singles ===
"Falling Down" as the first promotional single from the album. "Last Night on Earth" followed on 23 October.

=== Tour ===
To support the release of the album, Faith announced a 26-date UK tour scheduled for autumn 2021. The tour began in Oxford on 16 September and concluded in Liverpool on 25 October, with two performances at the London Palladium on 22 and 23 October. Josef Salvat joined as the special guest throughout the run. Tickets went on general sale on 2 October 2020.

== Critical reception ==
Infinite Things ratings
Review scores
Source	Rating
AllMusic	4/5 stars
The i Paper	3/5 stars
Stereoboard	3.5/5 stars
The Times	2/5 stars

Matt Collar of AllMusic praised Infinite Things for its emotional depth and memorable choruses, describing the album as a successful outcome of Faith's artistic choices. Will Hodgkinson of The Times offered a more critical perspective, suggesting that despite the album's artistic presentation and promises of creative reinvention, the music ultimately falls back on predictable, mainstream pop conventions.

== Track listing ==
Infinite Things – Standard edition
No.	Title	Writer(s)	Producer(s)	Length
1.	"Supernatural"	Paloma Faith; Tre Jean-Marie	Jean-Marie; Faith^{[v]}; Jamie McEvoy^{[v]}	3:33
2.	"Monster"	Faith; Uzoechi Emenike; Finlay Dow-Smith	Starsmith	3:11
3.	"Gold"	Sigrid Raabe; Steve McCutcheon	Steve Mac	3:58
4.	"Falling Down"	Faith; Jamie N Commons; Adam Argyle; Mark Crew	Crew; Faith^{[v]}; McEvoy^{[v]}	3:35
5.	"Infinite Things"	Faith; Clarence Coffee Jr.; Patrick Wimberly	Wimberly; Jean-Marie^{[c]}; TommyD^{[c]}; McEvoy^{[v]}	4:47
6.	"If This Is Goodbye"	Faith; Edward Harcourt-Smith	Ed Harcourt; Faith^{[v]}; McEvoy^{[v]}	4:44
7.	"Better Than This"	Faith; Amanda Cygnaeus; Richard "Liohn" Zastenker; Salem Al Fakir; Vincent Pontare; Jamie Hartman; Davide Rossi	Hartman; Jordan Riley	3:27
8.	"Me Time"	Faith; Faouzia Ouihya; Tobias Gad	Jean-Marie; TommyD^{[c]}; Faith^{[v]}; McEvoy^{[v]}	3:17
9.	"If Loving You Was Easy"	Faith; Josef Salvat	Harcourt; TommyD^{[c]}	3:44
10.	"Beautiful & Damned"	Faith; Nosa Obasohan; Jean-Marie; Daniel Traynor	Grades; Jean-Marie; Faith^{[v]}; McEvoy^{[v]}	2:37
11.	"I'd Die for You"	Faith; Jake Portrait; Wimberly	Wimberly; TommyD^{[c]}; Khaya Cohen^{[c]}; McEvoy^{[v]}	4:01
12.	"Living with a Stranger"	Faith; Natalie Dunn; Ryan Vojtesak; Kaelyn Behr	Charlie Handsome; Styalz Fuego; Faith^{[v]}; McEvoy^{[v]}; Dunn^{[v]}	3:26
13.	"Last Night on Earth"	Faith; Josh Record; Wimberly	Detonate; Faith^{[v]}; McEvoy^{[v]}	2:48
Total length:				47:08

Infinite Things – Deluxe edition
No.	Title	Writer(s)	Producer(s)	Length
14.	"Christmas Prayer" (with Gregory Porter)	Faith; Iain James; Jonny Lattimer; Sinéad Harnett	Lattimer; Rupert Christie	3:23
Total length:				50:31

=== Notes ===
- ^{^[v]} signifies a vocal producer.
- ^{^[a]} signifies an additional producer.
- ^{^[c]} signifies a miscellaneous or co-producer

== Credits and personnel ==
Credits were adapted from the liner notes.

Performers and musicians

- Paloma Faith – vocals
- Nosa Apollo – programming (10)
- Kevin Banks – electric guitar (11)
- Zara Benyounes – violin (5, 8–9, 11), viola (5, 8–9, 11)
- Ryan Coughlin – bass guitar (11), acoustic guitar (11), electric guitar (11)
- Peter Daley – keys (5), piano (13)
- Rosie Danvers – cello (5, 8–9, 11)
- Sam Dixon – bass (8)
- Louis Dowdeswell – trumpet (8)
- Jack Duxbury – synths (4), guitar (4), organ (4), bass (4)
- Grades – drums (10), bass (10), keyboards (10), synthesizer (10), programming (10)
- Ed Harcourt – background vocals (9), drums (9), organ (9), percussion (9), piano (9), synthesizers (9)
- Jamie Hartman – piano (7)
- Jamie N Commons – keys (4), programming (4), background vocals (4)
- Tre Jean-Marie – drums (1, 8, 10), bass (1, 10), keyboards (1, 10), synthesizer (1, 8, 10), programming (1, 8, 10), piano (8), guitar (8), rhodes (8)
- Gita Langley – violin (6)
- Chris Laws – drums (3)
- Nathaniel "Detonate" Ledwidge – keyboard programming (13), pianos (13), bass (13), guitars (13), drums (13)
- Martin Lovatt – trumpet (8)
- Steve Mac – keyboards (3)
- Janelle Martin – background vocals (1, 3, 9, 13)
- Howard McGill – saxophones (8)
- Naomi Miller – background vocals (1, 3, 9, 13)
- Baby N'Sola – background vocals (1, 9, 13)
- Nayla "Sillkey" Nyassa – piano (8), organ (8)
- John Parricelli – guitars (3)
- Kerenza Peacock – violin (5, 8–9, 11), viola (5, 8–9, 11)
- Richard Pryce – double bass (8–9, 11)
- Jordan Riley – drums (7), keyboards (7), bass (7), programming (7)
- Davide Rossi – all strings (7)
- Josef Salvat – background vocals (9)
- Starsmith – guitars (2), synthesizers (2), keyboards (2), drum programming (2)
- Dave Stewart – trombone (8)
- Aisha Stuart – background vocals (1, 3, 10)
- TommyD – keyboard (5, 8–9, 11)
- Dylan Wiggins – guitar (1, 10)
- Martin Williams – saxophones (8)
- Patrick Wimberly – synths (5, 11), drum programming (5, 11), drums (11), piano (11), keys (11)
- Wired Strings – strings (5, 8–9, 11)
- Andy Wood – trombone (8)

Production

- Paloma Faith – vocal production (1, 4, 6–8, 10–13), engineering (1, 4, 6–8, 10–13)
- Charlie Handsome – production (12)
- Khaya Cohen – additional production (11)
- Mark Crew – production (4), recording (4), mixing (4)
- James Cunningham – assistant mix engineering (1, 5–6, 9–13)
- Rosie Danvers – string arranging (5, 8, 11), brass arranging (8), arranging (9)
- Nat Dunn – vocal production (12), engineering (12)
- Duncan Fuller – assistant engineering (9)
- Chris Gehringer – mastering
- Serban Ghenea – mixing (3, 7)
- Grades – production (10)
- John Hanes – mix engineering (3, 7)
- Ed Harcourt – production (6, 9), engineering (6), recording (6)
- Jamie Hartman – production (7)
- Tre Jean-Marie – production (1, 8, 10), additional production (5)
- Chris Laws – engineering (3)
- Nathaniel "Detonate" Ledwidge – production (13), engineering (13)
- Steve Mac – production (3)
- Jamie McEvoy – vocal production (1, 4, 6–8, 10–13), engineering (1, 4–13)
- Dann Pursey – engineering (3)
- James F. Reynolds – mixing (1, 5–6, 9–13)
- Jordan Riley – production (7)
- Miles B.A. Robinson – engineering (5)
- Jamie Snell – mixing (2, 8)
- Starsmith – production (2)
- Styalz – production (12)
- TommyD – string session production (5, 8, 11)
- Ewan Vickery – mixing assistant (2, 8)
- Martin Williams – brass arranging (8)
- Patrick Wimberly – production (5, 11), engineering (11)
- Lewis Wright – engineering (5, 8–9, 11)

Design and art direction

- Theo Adams – creative direction
- Phoebe Arnold – styling
- Louie Banks – cover photography
- Chieska Fortune-Smith – photography
- Danny Hyland – set design
- Eamonn Hughes – hairstyling
- Imarni – nails
- Chris Murdoch – creative production
- Nick Royal – styling
- Masumi Saito – movement direction
- Daniel Sällström – makeup
- Leandro Pitz Schroeder – art direction

== Charts ==
Chart performance for Infinite Things
Chart (2020)	Peak position
Scottish Albums (Official Charts)	5
UK Albums (Official Charts)	4
UK Album Downloads (Official Charts)	4

== Certifications ==
Infinite Things certifications
Region	Certification	Certified units/sales
United Kingdom (BPI)	Silver	60,000^{‡}
^{‡} Sales+streaming figures based on certification alone.

== Release history ==
Release formats for Infinite Things
Region	Date	Format(s)	Edition	Label	Ref.
Various	13 November 2020	CD; cassette; digital download; streaming; vinyl	Standard	Sony Music UK	
Various	27 November 2020	Digital download; streaming	Deluxe	Sony Music UK	
