= 4.3.2.1. =

2010 film by Noel Clarke

- Original film poster
- Directed by: Noel Clarke; Mark Davis
- Written by: Noel Clarke
- Produced by: Damon Bryant; Noel Clarke; Dean O'Toole
- Starring: Emma Roberts; Tamsin Egerton; Ophelia Lovibond; Shanika Warren-Markland; Mandy Patinkin; Helen McCrory; Kevin Smith; Susannah Fielding; Camille Coduri
- Cinematography: Franco Pezzino
- Edited by: Mark Davis; Mark Everson
- Music by: Adam Lewis
- Distributed by: Universal Pictures
- Release date: 2 June 2010
- Running time: 117 minutes
- Countries: United Kingdom; United States
- Language: English
- Box office: $1.1 million

4.3.2.1. (which stands for "4 girls, 3 days, 2 cities, 1 chance") is a 2010 British crime thriller film directed by Noel Clarke and Mark Davis, written by Clarke and starring Emma Roberts, Tamsin Egerton, Ophelia Lovibond, Shanika-Warren Markland, Mandy Patinkin, Helen McCrory, Kevin Smith, Susannah Fielding, Camille Coduri and Clarke. 4.3.2.1. follows four spirited young women who get caught up with a diamond theft heist.

Clarke wrote 4.3.2.1. with the intention of making a more mainstream film compared to his previous work, Kidulthood, Adulthood, and West 10 LDN—which were gritty crime drama films set in West London. 4.3.2.1 was released in the United Kingdom on 2 June 2010. The film received generally negative reviews.

== Plot ==
Four 19-year-old friends – Joanne, Cassandra, Shannon, and Kerrys from London – all meet one other at a diner, where they see Dillon and Smoothy. As the police turn up, Dillon and Smoothy run off and Dillon accidentally drops a stolen diamond into Cassandra's bag. The four girls then walk out and go their separate ways home.

Shannon returns home just as her mother is leaving her father. Jo calls Shannon over to the 24-hour supermarket where she works with Angelo, but tells her to leave as soon as she arrives. When she refuses, Dillon kisses Jo, upsetting Shannon, so she grabs a Pringles tube from the shop and runs away. After getting drunk at a bar, Shannon is attacked by a gang and then rescued by Kelly. Shannon finds out that Kelly is searching for "15 diamonds". One is already in Cassandra's bag, and the rest are in the tube that fell out of Shannon's bag when she was attacked. Shannon escapes and retrieves the tube, then leaves a message informing Jo about the diamonds. Later, Shannon tracks down her mother and accuses her of not caring about her, especially when she forced her to get an abortion. Shannon soon holds the diamonds above a bridge, contemplating suicide.

Meanwhile, Cassandra visits New York City to meet up with Brett, whom she has met on the internet, and audition for a piano school. She has sex with Brett and in the morning finds all her possessions gone, except for her handbag, which contains a diamond. She also finds a letter written by Shannon's mother explaining why she left. She mails it to Kerrys' house to deliver it to Shannon. She goes to Brett's house to find that Brett is a stalker who hacked into Cassandra's computer, taking videos of her. When the fake Brett comes, she knocks him out and erases the footage and proceeds to take photos of his genitals as revenge. Cassandra forces her way into an impromptu audition with Jago Larofsky and wins a place at his school. She then leaves to go home to London, telling Jo she knows where Shannon is.

After witnessing her brother Manuel receive a package with instructions from Dillon and Smoothy, Kerrys and her girlfriend Jas break into Cassandra's home and stay there for the weekend. Manuel arrives there and they discover a panic room. Manuel locks them in the panic room, returns the package to Dillon and Smoothy as instructed and throws a party. When the two girls escape from the panic room, they angrily force everyone out of the flat. Kerrys goes home and finds Shannon's mother's letter that Cassandra had sent her. After making amends with her father, she locks Manuel in the trunk of his new car and drives off to find Shannon, but when he tries to attack her, she crashes the car into Jo's shop.

Jo begins to become suspicious of her new manager, Tee, who has been working with Dillon and Smoothy to deliver the diamonds, but one is missing. Dillon and Smoothy come to get the money, but find that Tee has betrayed them, keeping the money for himself, and they hold up the store in retaliation. When Shannon arrives, Jo tries to make her leave and Dillon kisses Jo, whom unseen to Shannon, is at gunpoint. Shannon leaves, stealing the tube of Pringles, which unbeknownst to her contains the 14 diamonds Tee had hidden inside. The next day, Jo realizes that Shannon has the diamonds, and when Tee is about to be shot by Kelly, Jo rescues him before Kerrys crashes Manuel's car into the shop. Jo helps Kerrys escape and leaves a note and a DVD implicating Tee, but when he tries to run, Angelo attacks him and Tee is then arrested by the police.

Cassandra returns with the last diamond. She meets Jo and Kerrys and they go to find Shannon. They talk her down and give her the letter, comforting her. They put the 15 diamonds together, give them to the police and fly to New York City with Kelly also on the plane.

== Cast ==
- Ophelia Lovibond as Shannon
- Emma Roberts as Joanne
- Tamsin Egerton as Cassandra
- Shanika Warren-Markland as Kerrys
- Adam Deacon as Dillon
- Susannah Fielding as Jas
- Jacob Anderson as Angelo
- Freddie Stroma as Cool Brett
- Adam Gillen as Geek Brett
- Linzey Cocker as Gwen
- Plan B as Terry
- Ashley Thomas as Smoothy
- Alan McKenna as Mr. Jones
- Camille Coduri as Mrs. Phillips
- Sean Pertwee as Mr. Richards
- Davie Fairbanks as Fraser
- Nicholas Briggs as Barry
- Kate Magowan as Mrs. Richards
- Helen McCrory as Mrs. Jones
- Ben Miller as Mr. Philips
- Alexander Siddig as Robert
- Michelle Ryan as Kelly
- Eve as Latisha
- Mandy Patinkin as Jago Larofsky
- Kevin Smith as Big Larry
- Noel Clarke as Tee
- Andrew Harwood Mills as Phil
- Gregg Chillin as Manuel

== Critical reception ==
The film has received largely negative reviews from critics, most critiquing the screenplay, "shaky" cinematography, and "horrible" main characters. As of October 2021, the film holds a 37% approval rating on film review website Rotten Tomatoes, based on 30 reviews with an average rating of 4.7/10.

Peter Bradshaw from British newspaper The Guardian and Wendy Ide from The Times both gave the film a negative review. Bradshaw said the film is "all over the place", also deeming that the acting is on the "torpid side", and Ide believed the film "might just claim back a small corner of the multiplex audience from the relentless onslaught of cynical Hollywood garbage" and described the film as "mostly" bad.

== Soundtrack ==
4.3.2.1.: Original Motion Picture Soundtrack

Soundtrack album by Various Artists
- Released: 28 May 2010
- Recorded: 2009–2010
- Genre: Film soundtrack
- Length: 4:01
- Label: Sony Music Entertainment
- Producer: Noel Clarke

Singles from 4.3.2.1.: Original Motion Picture Soundtrack
- 1. "Keep Moving" Released: 28 May 2010

The soundtrack was released on 28 May 2010 by Sony Music Entertainment.

1. "Keep Moving"- Adam Deacon & Bashy featuring Paloma Faith
2. "No Bullshit" – Bodyrox
3. "When I'm Alone" – Lissie
4. "Ya Get Me" (Movie Snippet) – Adam Deacon
5. "On This Ting" – Adam Deacon
6. "A Different Light" – Kerry Leatham
7. "Bend Over" (Movie Snippet) – Kevin Smith & Tamsin Egerton
8. "Better Days" (Revox) – Speech Debelle featuring Micachu, Wiley and Incredubwoy
9. "I Wanna Party" – Mz Bratt
10. "Don't Look Back" – The Union Exchange
11. "Go Home" – Eliza Doolittle
12. "Do You Fancy Me?" (Bluff) – Kerry Leatham
13. "No Significance" – Davinche featuring Henriette Bond
14. "Drunk Girls" – Stefan Abingdon
15. "Paradox" – WKB featuring Myles Sanko
16. "Dance Flor" – Davinche
17. "This Year" – Mz Bratt featuring Griminal
18. "Forever" – Ashley Walters
19. "She's a Gangsta" – Bashy featuring Zalon
20. "You Took My Shopping" (Movie Snippet) – Tamsin Egerton
21. "Typical Actor" – Adam Deacon
22. "Pretty Young Things" – Bodyrox
23. "My Size Kid" – Adam Deacon
24. "Strangely Sexy Though" (Movie Snippet) – Emma Roberts
