= Redux EP 002 =

EP by Kaskade
- Released: September 1, 2017
- Recorded: 2014–2017
- Genre: House
- Length: 20:24
- Label: Arkade

Redux EP 002 is an extended play by American DJ Kaskade. It was released on his record label Arkade on September 1, 2017, featuring collaborators such as Late Night Alumni, LOKII and Mr. Tape. The lead single is "Nobody Like You".

== Background ==
Production began around in 2014 and it is the follow-up EP to Redux 001. Originally consisting of 6 songs, the EP later included a seventh as Kaskade released an additional single. The EP is described as a "swing on future bass and a slice of dreamy R&B with jazz drums." Speaking about the EP, Kaskade said "I am really excited to get my Redux EP 002 in to the hands of my fans. It’s been three years since 001 came out, and judging from the vibe online around this release, they’re ready!" Release date of the EP was revealed on August 25, 2017, by Kaskade on social media.

== Track listing ==
No.	Title	Length
1.	"Nobody Like You"	2:58
2.	"Show of Hands" (with LOKII and Mr. Tape)	3:22
3.	"Tell Me" (featuring Late Night Alumni)	3:47
4.	"Play with Me"	3:15
5.	"Gone" (featuring Late Night Alumni)	3:02
6.	"Nobody Like You" (Sun Soaked Mix)	4:00
Total length:		20:24

== Charts ==
Chart (2017)	Peak position
US Top Dance Albums (Billboard)	10
