= Keep Moving (Adam Deacon and Bashy song) =

Single by Adam Deacon and Bashy featuring Paloma Faith

from the album 4.3.2.1.: Original Motion Picture Soundtrack and Kreative Koncepts
- Released: 28 May 2010
- Length: 4:13
- Label: Sony
- Songwriter(s): Alex "Cores" Hayes; Suzanne Vega; Steve Addabbo; Lenny Kaye
- Producer(s): Alex "Cores" Hayes

Adam Deacon singles chronology
"Keep Moving" (2010)	"Hype Hype Ting" (2011)

Bashy singles chronology
"Keep Moving" (2010)

Paloma Faith singles chronology
"Upside Down" (2010)	"Keep Moving" (2010)	"New York" (re-released) (2010)

"Keep Moving" is the lead single released from the soundtrack of the film 4.3.2.1.. The song is performed by Adam Deacon and Bashy, and features vocals from English recording artist Paloma Faith. The track was written and produced by Alex "Cores" Hayes, and was released on 28 May 2010. The song reworks Suzanne Vega's "Tom's Diner". The song also acts as the first single to be taken from Deacon's debut studio record, Kreative Koncepts, due for release in 2013.

== Background ==
Nick Mason and Phil Tidy, producers of the film, were approached by Maya Jenkins at Universal Pictures, who offered to help with the promotion of the film soundtrack. They came up with the idea of releasing a mainstream tie-in video for the track, featuring Paloma Faith, and an underground internet video, which features Deacon and Bashy only. The song was written and produced by Alex "Cores" Hayes, who also features in the video. The video was directed by Nick Mason, and produced by Phil Tidy. Shot on location in the Sanctum Soho Hotel in London's glittering West End, where parts of the film were also shot, Phil and Nick shot on Red Cam anamorphic lenses, so it would cut in as best as possible with the movie footage.

== Track listing ==
- Promotional CD single
1. "Keep Moving" (Radio Edit #1 - More Paloma, Less Adam & Bashy) - 2:58
2. "Keep Moving" (Radio Edit #2 - Less Paloma, More Adam & Bashy) - 3:02
- UK Digital EP
1. "Keep Moving" - 4:13
2. "Keep Moving" (Instrumental) - 4:07
