= Friedrich Gonne =

German painter

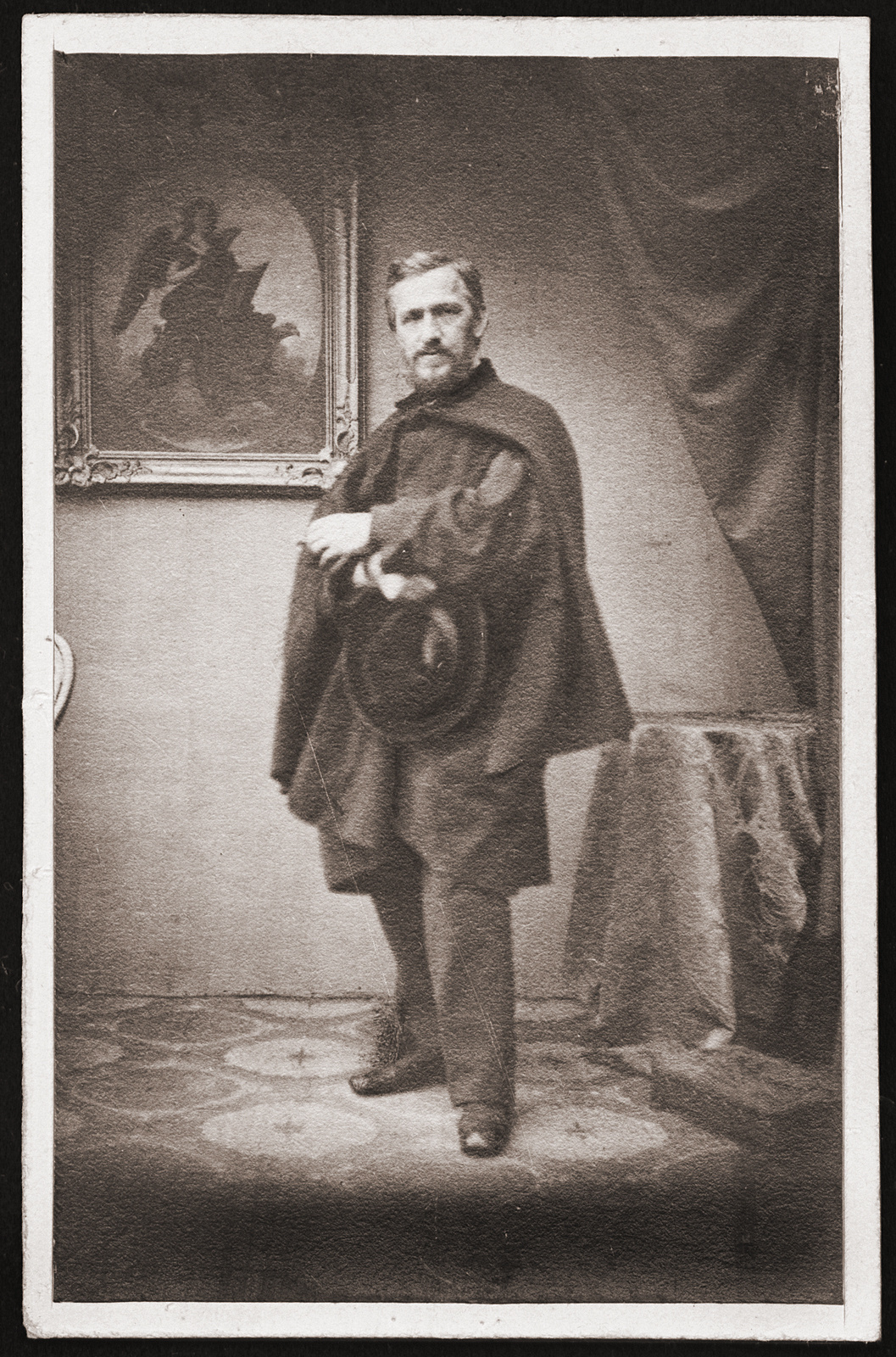
Friedrich Gonne (visiting card, c.1865)

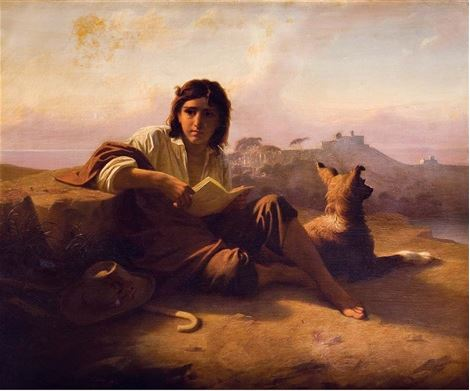
Pope Gregory XVI as a Young Man

Christian Friedrich Gonne (30 May 1813 – 30 March 1906) was a German genre painter, primarily of historical scenes. He also created portraits and was an occasional author.

== Biography ==
Born in Dresden, he was the son of a doctor and initially studied medicine. When he became twenty-one, in 1834, he decided to pursue a career in art and enrolled at the Dresden Academy of Fine Arts. After two years of study, he was awarded first prize for his work. He then went to Posen, where he briefly worked as a teacher. This was followed by study trips to Antwerp, Berlin and Munich, where he participated in an exhibition, then on to Rome. Several of his works were made into engravings.

When he returned to Dresden in the late 1840s, he was commissioned by the Sächsischer Kunstverein to create an altarpiece for the city of Schellenberg (now Augustusburg). He went on to create several more altarpieces, but the one he painted for the Heilig-Kreuz-Kirche in Falkenstein was destroyed in 1978 when the Pastor, Rolf Günther, committed suicide by self-immolation. In 1848, at the request of the banker, Martin Wilhelm Oppenheim, he oversaw the painting of murals at the Palais Kaskel-Oppenheim.

From 1857 to 1890, he was a professor at the Dresden Academy. Among the many portraits he painted there, his most familiar is the one of King John of Saxony, which is on display at the Leipzig Town Hall. From 1875 to 1877, he created a ceiling painting in the vestibule on the south side of the Semperoper, depicting "Poetic Justice: with Heroes from Drama and Opera".

He was married to Philippine Kaskel (1813–1889), the sister of Carl von Kaskel, who owned the Bankhaus Kaskel and, later, the Dresdner Bank.
