= Better Than This (song) =

2020 song by Paloma Faith

Single by Paloma Faith

from the album Infinite Things
- Released: 5 September 2020
- Length: 3:27
- Label: Sony
- Songwriters: Paloma Faith; Amanda Cygnaeus; Davide Rossi; Richard Zastenker; Salem Al Fakir; Vincent Pontare; Jamie Hartman
- Producers: Jamie Hartman; Jordan Riley

Paloma Faith singles chronology
"Mistakes" (2020)	"Better Than This" (2020)	"Gold" (2020)

Music video
- "Better Than This" on YouTube

"Better Than This" is a song by English singer and songwriter Paloma Faith. It was released on 5 September 2020 by Sony Music as the lead single from her fifth studio album Infinite Things. The song was written by manda Cygnaeus, Davide Rossi, Jamie Hartman, Faith, Richard Zastenker, Salem Al Fakir and Vincent Pontare.

== Background ==
Faith released "Better Than This" as her first solo release, since her 2017 album The Architect, later reissued in a deluxe edition in 2018. Earlier in 2020, she collaborated with English DJ Jonas Blue on the single "Mistakes" before returning with this release. About the song, Faith described: "It's love songs for people who are there to stay. That enduring love. Warts and all. I don't think I've ever heard a love song like that, actually".

== Composition ==
According to Stereoboard's Laura Johnson, "Better Than This" features "empowering" lyrics, supported by piano and string arrangements. It is described by Mages Emma of Celebmix as an emotionally driven track with raw lyrics, focusing on long-term relationships and the resilience required to sustain them.

== Music video ==
A music video for "Better Than This" was first released onto YouTube on 11 September 2020. It was directed by David Wilson and shot in Faith's hometown, Hackney.

== Credits and personnel ==
Credits were adapted from Tidal.

- Jamie Hartman – producer, composer, lyricist, piano
- Jordan Riley – producer, bass, drums, keyboards, programmer
- Amanda Cygnaeus – composer, lyricist
- Davide Rossi – composer, lyricist, strings
- Paloma Faith – composer, lyricist, associated performer
- Richard Zastenker – composer, lyricist
- Salem Al Fakir – composer, lyricist
- Vincent Pontare – composer, lyricist
- Chris Gehringer – mastering engineer
- John Hanes – mixing engineer
- Serban Ghenea – mixing engineer

== Charts ==
"Better Than This" chart performance
Chart (2020)	Peak position
Scotland Singles (OCC)	26
UK Singles Downloads (OCC)	20

== Release history ==
"Better Than This" release history
Region	Date	Format	Label	Ref.
United Kingdom	5 September 2020	Digital download	Sony	
