= Do You Want the Truth or Something Beautiful? (song) =

Single by Paloma Faith

from the album Do You Want the Truth or Something Beautiful?
- B-side: "Sexy Chick" (Live From BBC 1's Radio Live Lounge)
- Released: 21 December 2009
- Length: 4:35 (album version); 3:42 (radio edit)
- Label: Epic
- Songwriter(s): Paloma Faith; Ed Harcourt
- Producer(s): Ed Harcourt

Paloma Faith singles chronology
"New York" (2009)	"Do You Want the Truth or Something Beautiful?" (2009)	"Upside Down" (2010)

Music video
- "Do You Want the Truth or Something Beautiful?" on YouTube

"Do You Want the Truth or Something Beautiful?" (sometimes stylized as "Do You Want the Truth or Something Else") is a song by English recording artist Paloma Faith from her 2009 debut studio album of the same name. It was released on 21 December 2009, and peaked at number 64 on the UK Singles Chart. It was co-written with Ed Harcourt.

== Critical reception ==
Digital Spy gave the song 4/5, saying; 'Better yet, the song itself sustains the weight of her lyrical pretensions. A sumptuous, string-swathed ballad whose charms unfurl after three or four plays - all sung in Faith's customary dramatic way of course - it's elegant, filled with intrigue and as aromatic as a boudoir whose tart keeps forgetting to snuff out the candles'.

== Chart performance ==
"Do You Want the Truth or Something Beautiful?" failed to reach the top 20. However, It began to receive increased radio airplay throughout December 2009 and January 2010, and began to receive increasing amounts of digital downloads, and the song finally entered the UK Singles Chart on 2 January 2010 at number 90. It peaked at number 64 spending one week in the chart.

== Music video ==
The music video for the song was released on 20 November 2009. It was directed by Chris Sweeney.

== Track listing ==
Digital download
No.	Title	Length
1.	"Do You Want the Truth or Something Beautiful" (Radio edit)	3:42
2.	"Sexy Chick" (Live From BBC 1's Radio Live Lounge)	5:13

Do You Want the Truth or Something Beautiful? - EP
No.	Title	Length
1.	"Do You Want the Truth or Something Beautiful?" (Radio edit)	3:42
2.	"Do You Want the Truth or Something Beautiful?" (Jonny L Remix)	5:35
3.	"Do You Want the Truth or Something Beautiful?" (Joe and Will Ask? Remix)	7:24

== Charts ==
"Do You Want the Truth or Something Beautiful?" chart performance
Chart (2010)	Peak position
UK Singles (OCC)	64

== Release history ==
"Do You Want the Truth or Something Beautiful?" release history
Region	Date	Label	Ref.
United Kingdom	18 December 2009	Epic	
