= Stone Cold Sober (Paloma Faith song) =

Single by Paloma Faith

from the album Do You Want the Truth or Something Beautiful?
- B-side: "I Just Wait"
- Released: 15 June 2009
- Length: 2:56
- Label: Epic
- Songwriters: Paloma Faith; Paddy Byrne; Blair Mackichan
- Producers: Patrick Byrne and Blair Mackichan

Paloma Faith singles chronology
"Stone Cold Sober" (2009)	"New York" (2009)

Music video
- "Stone Cold Sober" on YouTube

"Stone Cold Sober" is the debut single by English recording artist Paloma Faith from her debut studio album Do You Want the Truth or Something Beautiful? (2009). It was released on 15 June 2009 and entered the UK chart at number 17.

== Background ==
"Stone Cold Sober" was featured in the commercial for the Max Lashes product manufactured by cosmetics company Rimmel London. The B-side, "I Just Wait", was featured in an Alcohol: Know Your Limits public information film run by the NHS about binge drinking in 2008.

== Critical reception ==
Digital Spy gave the song 4/5 stars and a positive review stating: "'Stone Cold Sober' makes the most of her theatrical background. Sure, it's another slice of post-Winehouse retro-pop, but it's more interesting that most tunes of that ilk, partly because it's a got a chorus you could quite easily do the can-can to, and partly because Faith gives it more sass than a backchatting teenager. Maybe a spell in the circus should be compulsory for all pop wannabes?" BBC Chart Blog gave the song a mixed review with 3/5 stars: "'Stone Cold Sober' is more of an uptempo rockin' raveup than it is an old school soul resurrection (with desperate lyrics, let us not forget), there are a LOT of little clues scattered through this endeavour which suggest Paloma is being sold as a sequel to a very successful franchise."

== Chart performance ==
"Stone Cold Sober" had moderate success throughout the charts, being most successful in the UK, peaking at number 17 and spending five weeks in the chart. The song peaked at number 70 in Germany, 45 in Australia, 36 in Switzerland and number 30 in New Zealand.

== Music video ==
The music video for the song was directed by the British music video director Sophie Muller.

== Track listing ==
Digital download
No.	Title	Length
1.	"Stone Cold Sober"	2:56
2.	"I Just Wait"	4:48

== Charts ==
"Stone Cold Sober" chart performance
Chart (2009)	Peak position
Australian Physical Singles (ARIA)	45
Germany (GfK)	70
Netherlands (Dutch Top 40 Tipparade)	3
Netherlands (Single Top 100)	84
New Zealand (Recorded Music NZ)	30
Scottish Singles Sales (Official Charts)	15
Switzerland (Schweizer Hitparade)	36
UK Singles (Official Charts)	17

== Certifications ==
"Sober Stone Cold" certifications
Region	Certification	Certified units/sales
United Kingdom (BPI)	Silver	200,000^{‡}
^{‡} Sales+streaming figures based on certification alone.

== Release history ==
"Stone Cold Sober" release history
Region	Date	Label	Ref.
United Kingdom	15 June 2009	Epic	
Germany	11 September 2009	Epic	
