= Upside Down (Paloma Faith song) =

Single by Paloma Faith

from the album Do You Want the Truth or Something Beautiful?
- B-side: "Technicolour"
- Released: 15 March 2010
- Length: 3:11
- Label: Epic
- Songwriters: Paloma Faith; Andrew Nicholas Love; Jos Hartvig Jorgensen; Belle Sara Humble
- Producers: Andy Love and Jos Jorgensen

Paloma Faith singles chronology
| "Do You Want the Truth or Something Beautiful?" (2009) | "Upside Down" (2010) | "Keep Moving" (2010) |

Music video
- "Upside Down" on YouTube

"Upside Down" is a song by English recording artist Paloma Faith from her debut studio album, Do You Want the Truth or Something Beautiful? (2009). It was released in the United Kingdom on 15 March 2010, by Epic Records as the fourth single from the album. "Upside Down" was written by Faith, Andrew Nicholas Love, Jos Hartvig Jorgensen and Belle Sara Humble, and it was produced by Love and Jorgensen

The song received mixed reviews from critics. "Upside Down" reached a peak position of fifty-five in the UK chart. The music video was directed by Chris Sweeney, who previously directed the video for Faith's third single, "Do You Want the Truth or Something Beautiful?".

== Background ==
Faith performed the song on Simon Mayo's BBC Radio 2 show on 18 January 2010 and became Scott Mills' 'Record of the Week' on BBC Radio 1. "Upside Down" was released by Epic Records on 15 March 2010. The song was accompanied by the B-side "Technicolour".

== Reception ==
=== Critical response ===
Before the single was released, Mayer Nissim from Digital Spy said "'Upside Down' backs up Faith's claim to have absorbed influences from the pre-rock 'n' roll era, mixing up a '50s dancehall vibe with her ever-present soul croon". Charles Decant of Ozap called the single "the more playful title on the album". Paul English of the Daily Record gave the single four stars, commenting "If they remade Roger Rabbit, Paloma would be Jessica and this would be on the soundtrack. A post-Winehouse jive-time workout, this perky number from the Burlesque-influenced Londoner is begging to be danced to by men with trilby hats and spats. The dominant Faith continues..."

A reporter for the Huddersfield Daily Examiner was less positive towards the song saying "Sets off like some surreal nursery rhyme and never seems to mature that much." While a writer from the Liverpool Echo deemed it one of the worst releases of the week, saying "what it lacks in complexity, lyrics and any real meaning it makes up for in catchiness."

=== Chart performance ===
On 14 March 2010, "Upside Down" debuted on the UK Singles Chart at number 89, on downloads alone. The following week, the single climbed to number 58, which was followed by a further climb of 3 places on 28 March 2010 to its current peak at number 55. The song spent two weeks in the chart. On 26 December, the track climbed back into the UK chart after a strong number of downloads, charting at number 99.

== Music video ==
The video, directed by Chris Sweeney, was described by Faith as looking like "a kind of Kelis/André 3000 type video". Ryan Brockington of the New York Post called the video "amazing", but added "see if you slowly walk backwards searching blindly for an exit". A writer from Sugarscape called it "the sunniest video in all the land".

== Track listing ==
- Digital download
1. "Upside Down" – 3:11
2. "Technicolour" – 3:00
- Digital EP
1. "Upside Down" – 3:11
2. "Upside Down" (Cahill Club Remix) – 6:10
3. "Upside Down" (Widower Remix) – 4:53
4. "Upside Down" (DC Breaks Remix) – 6:57

== Credits and personnel ==
Credits were adapted from Do You Want the Truth or Something Beautiful? album liner notes.

- Paloma Faith – vocals, writer
- Andrew Nicholas Love – writer
- Jos Hartvig Jorgensen – writer
- Belle Sara Humble – writer
- Andy Love – producer, keyboard programming
- Jos Jorgensen – producer, guitar programming
- Steve Fitzmaurice – audio mixing
- Jay Reynolds - additional production
- Jamie Reddington - additional production
- Matthew Waer - upright bass
- Ruthie Phoenix - saxophone
- Linden Berelowitz - drums

== Charts ==
"Upside Down" chart performance
| Chart (2010) | Peak position |
|---|---|
| Iceland (RÚV) | 20 |
| UK Singles (OCC) | 55 |

== Certifications ==
"Upside Down" certifications
| Region | Certification | Certified units/sales |
|---|---|---|
| United Kingdom (BPI) | Gold | 400,000^{‡} |
^{‡} Sales+streaming figures based on certification alone.

== Release history ==
"Upsidr Down" release history
| Region | Date | Label | Ref. |
|---|---|---|---|
| United Kingdom | 15 March 2010 | Epic | |
