= Paloma Faith =

English singer-songwriter and actress (born 1981)

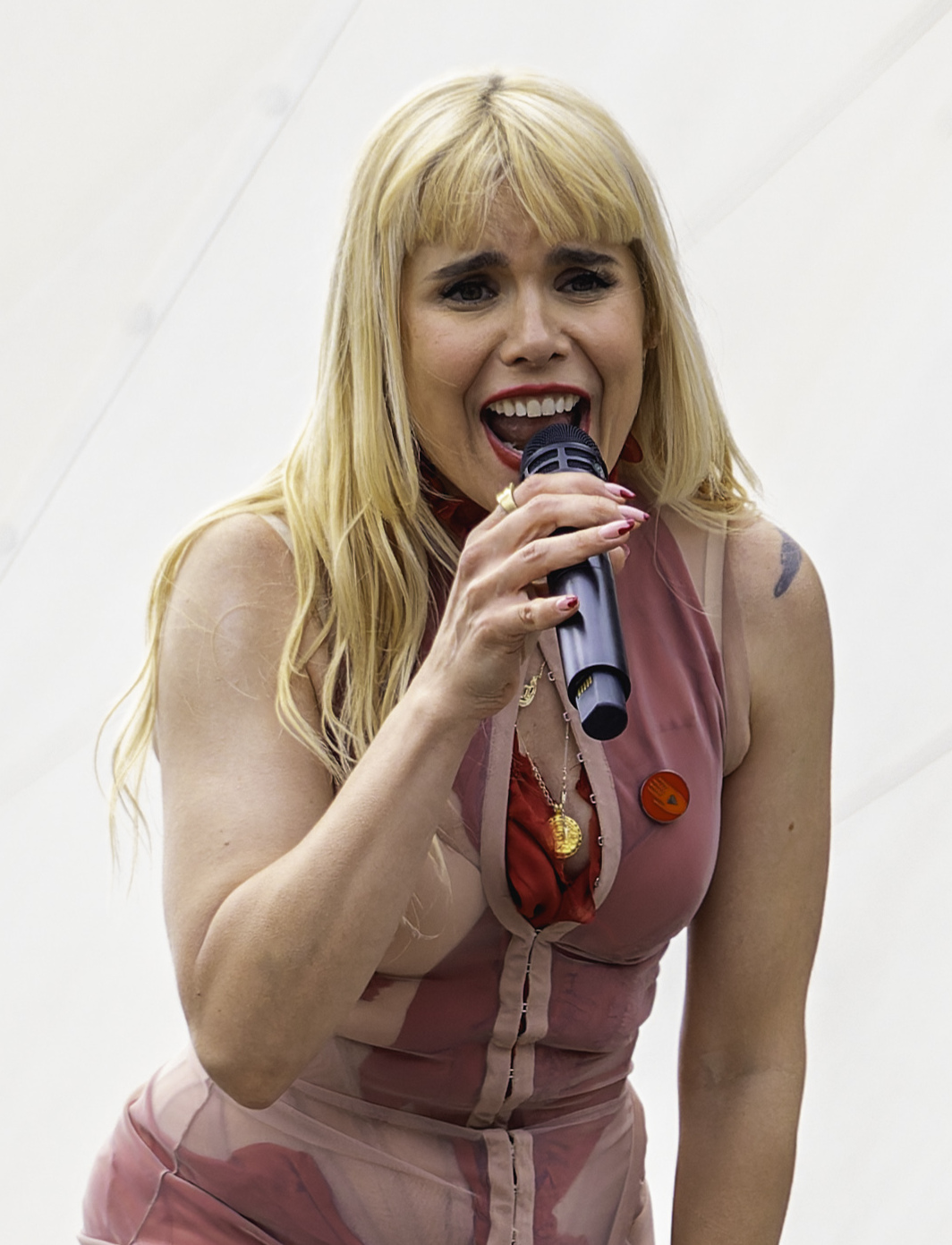
- Faith in 2024
- Born: Paloma Faith Blomfield; 21 July 1981 (age 45); Hackney, London, England
- Occupations: Singer; songwriter; actress; television personality
- Years active: 2007–present
- Spouse: Rian Haynes (m. 2005; div. 2009)
- Partners: Leyman Lahcine (2012–2022); Stevie Thomas (2024–present)
- Children: 3
- Musical career
- Genres: Pop; soul; R&B; disco; jazz
- Instrument: Vocals
- Labels: Epic; RCA
- Website: www.palomafaith.com

Paloma Faith Blomfield (born 21 July 1981) is an English singer, songwriter, actress and television personality. After signing with Epic Records in 2008, Faith released her debut album, Do You Want the Truth or Something Beautiful? (2009), which produced the UK top-twenty singles "Stone Cold Sober" and "New York". Her second album, Fall to Grace (2012), charted at number two on the UK Albums Chart, earned her two Brit Award nominations, and spawned her first UK top-ten single "Picking Up the Pieces" and the top-twenty cover version of INXS's "Never Tear Us Apart".

Faith's third album, A Perfect Contradiction (2014), was certified double platinum by the British Phonographic Industry and spawned the UK top-ten singles "Can't Rely on You" and "Only Love Can Hurt Like This", with the latter topping the charts in Australia. She collaborated with the duo Sigma on the 2014 single "Changing", which charted atop the UK singles chart. Her fourth album, The Architect (2017), debuted at number one in the UK, becoming Faith's first number one album. In 2018, she co-wrote and featured on DJ Sigala's single "Lullaby". Her next two albums, Infinite Things (2020) and The Glorification of Sadness (2024), both reached the top-five in the UK.

As an actress, Faith appeared in the films St Trinian's (2007), The Imaginarium of Doctor Parnassus (2009), Dread (2009), Youth (2015), and the television series Pennyworth (2019–2022). She has also served as a coach on the television talent show The Voice UK (2016) and its spin-off The Voice Kids (2020). In 2024, Faith released the memoir, MILF, which became a Sunday Times Bestseller. In 2025, she was a contestant on the first series of the reality television show The Celebrity Traitors.

== Early life ==
Paloma Faith Blomfield was born in the Hackney area of London on 21 July 1981, the daughter of an English mother and Spanish father. Both of her parents were raised in Norfolk. Her parents separated when she was two years old and divorced two years later. She was raised by her mother in Stoke Newington, although she maintains a close relationship with her paternal grandmother. As a child, she took ballet classes in Dalston. After completing her A-levels at City and Islington College, she went on to study for a degree in contemporary dance at the Northern School of Contemporary Dance in Leeds, while working as a hip-hop dancer at the nightclub LoveDough. She then studied for an MA in theatre directing at Central Saint Martins College of Art and Design and took various part-time jobs as a sales assistant at Agent Provocateur, a singer in a burlesque cabaret, a bartender, a life model, and a magician's assistant.

== Career ==
=== 2007–2008: Career beginnings ===
Faith's first foray into music began when she mimicked famous soul and jazz singers including Etta James and Billie Holiday, whom she admires and cites as influences for her own work. She met her managers Jamie Binns and Christian Wåhlberg of Lateral Management in 2007. Binns had been tipped off by the producer Peanut, a client who had recently worked with Faith in his studio and been impressed. He met up with Faith shortly afterwards and was "completely blown away", later saying, "I wasn't sure what this girl was going to do – she was an actress and a singer – but there was just something about her in that artistic realness that when I came out of the meeting I called Christian and said, 'We have to do something with this girl!'"

During her time at college, Faith worked in a pub where the manager asked her to front his band, which they later called Paloma and the Penetrators. During a performance with the band at a cabaret show, she was scouted by an A&R man from Epic Records, who invited her to sing for the manager of the label. 20 minutes into the audition, she asked the manager to turn his phone off; when he refused, she walked out. The manager later called her and offered her a contract, claiming that he had seen many acts since their meeting but none had been as memorable as her. She turned down an opportunity to join Amy Winehouse's band in order to write and perform her own songs. Her first recognised work was the song "It's Christmas (and I Hate You)", which she recorded as a duet with Josh Weller in 2008.

=== 2009–2013: Do You Want the Truth or Something Beautiful? and Fall to Grace ===
In June 2009, Faith released her debut single "Stone Cold Sober", which reached number 17 on the UK singles chart. Her second single, "New York", was released in September 2009, charting at number 15 in the UK. It was later re-released as an updated version featuring rapper Ghostface Killah. In September 2009, she released her debut album, Do You Want the Truth or Something Beautiful?, for which she wrote or co-wrote all of the songs in the UK, Sweden and America. It debuted at number 14 on the UK Albums Chart and later peaked at number nine, remaining in the chart for 16 weeks. and becoming BBC Radio 2's "Album of the Week" from 19 September 2009. She released her third single, the album's title track in December 2009. The song peaked at number 64 in the UK. In the same year, Faith appeared as a vocalist on Basement Jaxx's Scars album and American hip-hop artist MF Doom's album, Born Like This.

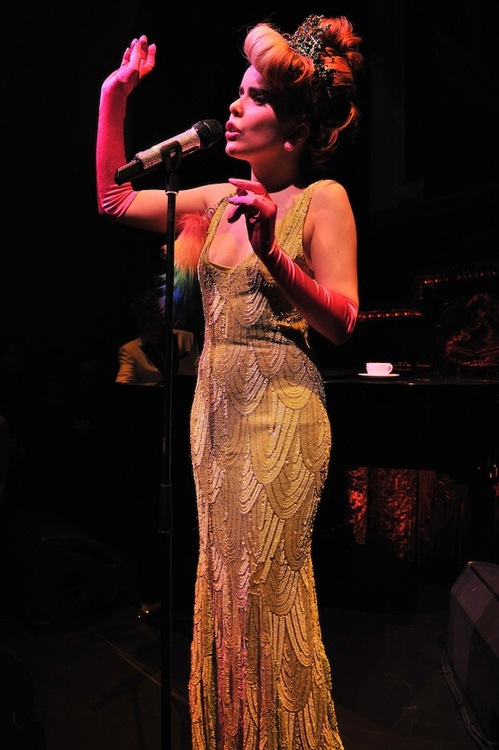
Faith performing in October 2012

In March 2010, Faith released her fourth single "Upside Down", which reached number 55 in the UK. To promote the album, she embarked on her first headlining tour of the UK and Ireland commencing in March. The Times described the tour as being "full of theatrical artifice, but based on the rock-solid foundation of [Faith]'s sensational singing voice and a personality that sparkled like a rough diamond". She performed a live set for the BBC's Radio 2 Introduces... and gave an interview to host Dermot O'Leary. Faith performed at numerous festivals throughout that summer, including T4 on the Beach, the Cheltenham Jazz Festival and the 2010 iTunes Festival. In May 2010, Faith featured on the theme song "Keep Moving" to the 2010 British film 4.3.2.1, alongside Adam Deacon and Bashy. In October 2010, Faith released "Smoke & Mirrors" as the final single from her debut album.

In January 2011, Faith was nominated for British Female Solo Artist at the 2011 BRIT Awards, where she also performed "Forget You" alongside Cee Lo Green. She appeared on the charity single "Hard Times" with Plan B and Elton John in May 2011. In May 2012, Faith released her second studio album Fall to Grace. She enlisted record producers Nellee Hooper and Jake Gosling to work with her on the project. The album charted at number two on the UK Albums Chart. The album's first single "Picking Up the Pieces" reached number seven on the UK singles chart, becoming Faith's first top-ten single. In May 2012, Faith joined The Voice UK as one of four guest mentors. She worked with coach Danny O'Donoghue during the battle rounds phase of the competition and also performed "Picking Up the Pieces" during the results show.

In August 2012, Faith released "30 Minute Love Affair" as the second single from Fall to Grace. She recorded a version of INXS's "Never Tear Us Apart" for a John Lewis advertisement, which began airing on television from September 2012. It was later included on the album as a single. Faith released "Just Be" as the fourth single from the album on in December 2012. She performed the track on Later... with Jools Holland. In early 2013, Faith embarked on a headline UK and Ireland tour in support of the album. She received two nominations at the 2013 BRIT Awards; for Best Female and for Best British Album for Fall to Grace. The album has been certified double platinum by the British Phonographic Industry for sales in excess of 700,000 copies.

=== 2014–2021: A Perfect Contradiction, The Architect and Infinite Things ===
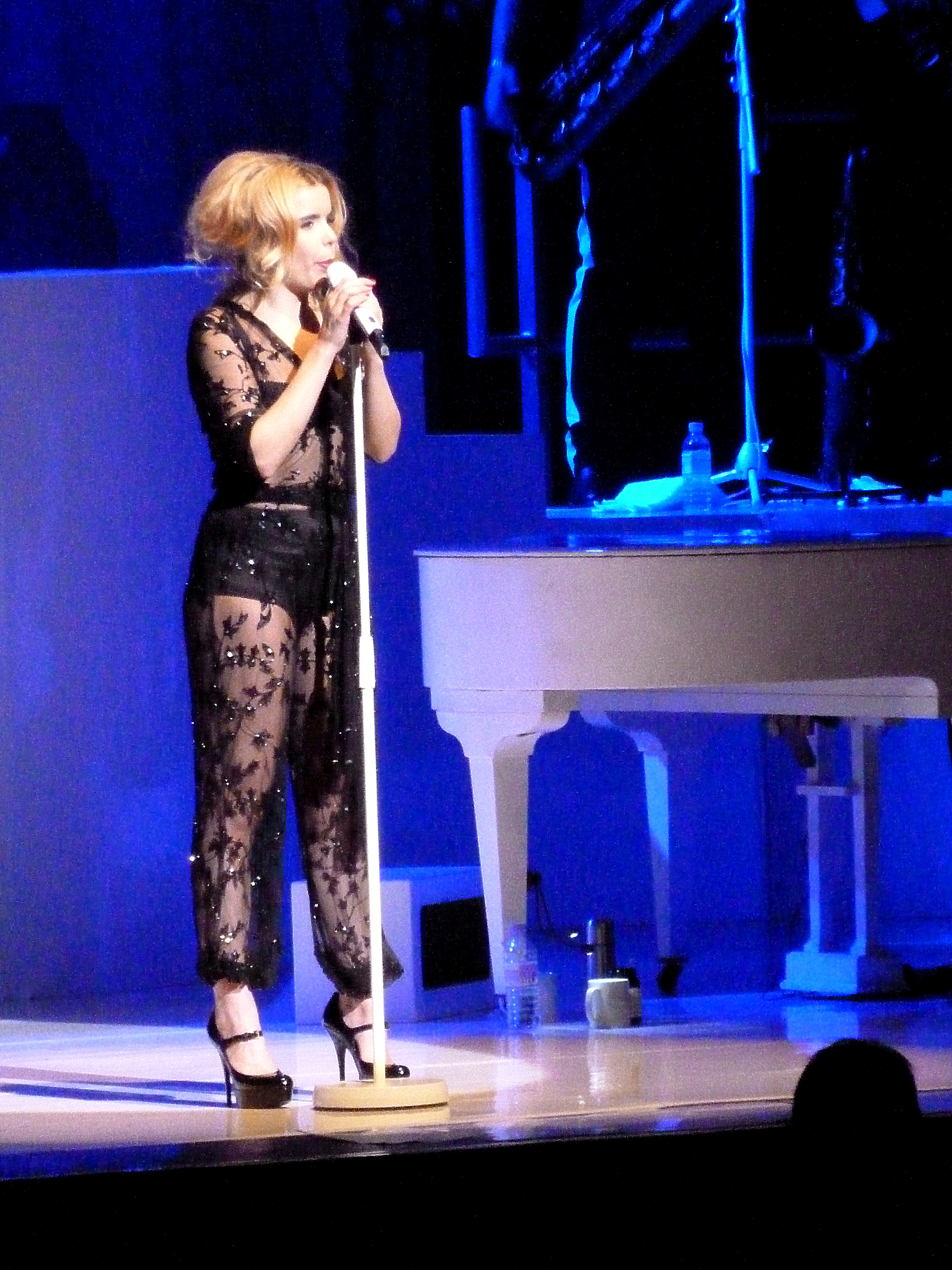
Faith performing in November 2014

In January 2013, Faith revealed that she had begun to write her third studio album during her time in the US. Later that year, she headlined the Evolution Festival in Newcastle upon Tyne. In March 2014, Faith's third album A Perfect Contradiction was released. It became her fastest-selling album to date, debuting at number two in the UK and receiving a double platinum certification. The lead single "Can't Rely on You" produced by Pharrell Williams, became her second top-ten single in the UK. The album's second single "Only Love Can Hurt Like This", written by Diane Warren, became her most successful single to date, reaching number six in the UK, number one in Australia and number three in New Zealand. After the success of the single, the album reached a new peak of number four in Australia. The album's third single, "Trouble with My Baby" was released in August 2014.

In September 2014, British drum and bass duo Sigma released their single "Changing", featuring vocals from Faith. It debuted at number one in the UK, becoming her first UK number one single. In November 2014, a repackaged "Outsider's Edition" of her third album was released featuring four new songs including the single "Ready for the Good Life". The same month, Faith joined the charity group Band Aid 30 along with other British and Irish pop acts, recording a new version of the track "Do They Know It's Christmas?" to raise money for the 2014 Ebola crisis in West Africa. At the 2015 Brit Awards, Faith won the award for British Female Solo Artist, becoming her first win.

In June 2015, Faith confirmed that she had started the process of creating her fourth studio album. She made reference to Jimi Hendrix and Janis Joplin as inspirations for the record. In August 2015, it was announced that Faith would become a coach on The Voice UK. She also launched her own management and publishing company.

In August 2017, Faith returned with the lead single "Crybaby" from her fourth album entitled The Architect. The album was later released in November, debuting at number one on the UK Albums Chart, becoming Faith's first UK chart-topping album. Three further singles from the album have been released: "Guilty", "'Til I'm Done" and "Warrior". In February 2018, Faith released a collaboration with DJ Sigala, "Lullaby", which charted at number six in the UK, becoming her fourth top-ten single as a lead artist and fifth overall. The following month, Faith covered the 1960s song "Make Your Own Kind of Music" by Mama Cass. It featured in a TV commercial by Škoda that was heavily played throughout the year, causing the track to chart at number 28 in the UK. In November 2018, Faith released a re-issue "Zeitgeist Edition" of The Architect, featuring six new songs including "Make Your Own Kind of Music", "Lullaby" and "Loyal".

In 2020, Faith reprised her role as a coach on The Voice UK's children's counterpart, The Voice Kids for its fourth series. In August 2020, the title of her fifth studio album was announced as Infinite Things.

=== 2023–present: The Glorification of Sadness and In Full Colour! ===
In October 2023, Faith announced that "How You Leave a Man", the lead single from her sixth album, would be released on 11 October. With the release, she announced a nationwide tour to would begin in April 2024; the album, The Glorification of Sadness, was released on 16 February 2024. Faith announced the album is inspired by the separation of her long-term relationship.

On 31 January 2024, it was announced that Faith would be a headline performance at Camp Bestival at Weston Park in Shropshire in August 2024. On 28 January 2025 Faith launched her first podcast "Mad, Sad & Bad".

Faith's XX studio album, In Full Colour!, will be released on 5 March 2027. The first single "Gone" was released on 13 November 2026.

== Acting career ==
In 2007, Faith appeared in an episode of the BBC police drama HolbyBlue portraying a thief. She was cast as Andrea in St Trinian's in 2007. Faith was also cast in Terry Gilliam's The Imaginarium of Doctor Parnassus as Sally, the girlfriend of the Devil (played by Tom Waits) in 2009. She appeared in the horror film Dread as Clara Thornhill. She later starred in the Channel 4 series Coming Up and the short film A Nice Touch. Of getting the part, she stated: "I don't think they even knew I was an actress. I went to an audition and they said that they liked my interpretation of the character and I said, 'I'm just being myself'." In 2013, she appeared as cabaret performer Georgia, in a television adaptation of P. G. Wodehouse's Blandings (episode "The Crime Wave at Blandings") on the BBC. In 2015 she appeared as herself in Paolo Sorrentino's Youth. Later that year, Faith also appeared as Tinker Bell in the TV film Peter & Wendy, based on J. M. Barrie's novel Peter Pan.

In 2018, Faith was cast as the lead villainess in the Epix series Pennyworth, a Batman prequel. She also voices Portia the goth poodle on 101 Dalmatian Street.

== Other works ==
In 2016, Faith became a judge on The Voice UK. She remained on the panel for one series, owing to her pregnancy. She returned to the show in 2020 to judge its spin-off series The Voice Kids UK. In 2024, Faith released MILF, a memoir focusing on motherhood and womanhood. It became a Sunday Times Bestseller. In May 2025, Faith was announced as a contestant on the first series of The Celebrity Traitors. She was the first contestant to be "murdered", in episode two after Alan Carr "murdered" her in plain sight.

== Artistry ==
Faith is known for her retro and eccentric style. She is a mezzo-soprano. Her music often blends soul and elements of jazz and gospel; she has been consequently compared to Amy Winehouse, Adele and Duffy.

== Personal life ==
During an episode of The Voice UK, Faith said she once read an article that called music artist KT Tunstall old despite being only 27 at the time. As she was 27 herself at the time, Faith felt pressure to lie about her age when trying to acquire a record deal, and claimed to be 23. She later admitted to lying about her age, saying, "I want to be judged for my music, not my age", and would frequently change her age on Wikipedia until a fan provided her birth certificate.

Faith married New Zealand chef Rian Haynes in 2005; they separated after eight months and were divorced in 2009. She later said of the marriage: "It was just a young, frivolous thing. We were in our early twenties and we did something quickly and realised it was a mistake. But we're still close. I am still friends with him. All my other relationships were the ones that screwed me up, not that one!"

In August 2016, it was revealed that Faith was expecting her first child with long-term boyfriend Leyman Lahcine. She gave birth to a daughter in December 2016, and had a second daughter in February 2021. In an October 2023 interview with The Independent, she stated that their 10-year relationship had ended, but would not confirm that they had been married. Faith gave birth to her third child, a son with music venue director Stevie Thomas, in March 2026.

== Politics ==
In March 2024, Faith signed an Oxfam letter calling for an end to UK arms exports to Israel. On 13 December 2024, Faith held a benefit concert alongside Paul Weller, Kneecap, Primal Scream, Liam Bailey and Lowkey, which raised more than £115,000 for Medical Aid for Palestinians. In March 2025, Faith gave a speech at a protest against the March 2025 Israeli attacks on the Gaza Strip, saying: "I know that Israel has violated every ceasefire agreement it has ever signed. But even with that knowledge, after months of watching this genocide, I wasn't prepared for the new depths of brutality that Israel has descended to."

== Discography ==
- Do You Want the Truth or Something Beautiful? (2009)
- Fall to Grace (2012)
- A Perfect Contradiction (2014)
- The Architect (2017)
- Infinite Things (2020)
- The Glorification of Sadness (2024)
- In Full Colour! (2027)

== Filmography ==
=== Film ===
List of films and roles
Year	Title	Role	Notes
2007	St Trinian's	Andrea	
2009	The Imaginarium of Doctor Parnassus	Sally	
2009	Dread	Clara Thornhill	
2012	A Nice Touch	Alma	Short film
2015	Youth	Herself	

=== Television ===
List of television appearances and roles
Year	Title	Role	Notes
2006	Mayo	Goth Girl	Episode: "Killing Me Softly"
2006	The Impressionists	Renoir's Model	1 episode
2006	Tricky TV	Coach	1 episode
2007	HolbyBlue	Donna Reynolds	Episode: 1.7
2007	Tittybangbang	Hairsalon Customer / Nurse	Series 3, episodes 2 and 4
2007	Dogface	Various	Episode: 1.4
2009	Never Mind the Buzzcocks	Herself	Guest; 2 episodes
2010	Never Mind the Buzzcocks	Herself	Guest; 2 episodes
2010	Coming Up	Rainy	Episode: "I Don't Care"
2010–2017	Celebrity Juice	Herself	Guest; 10 episodes
2012, 2016, 2023, 2026	The Voice UK	Battle Advisor; Coach	Series 1, 12 and 14; series 5
2013	Blandings	Georgia	Episode: "The Crimewave at Blandings"
2013	Let's Dance For Comic Relief	Guest Judge	
2015	Peter & Wendy	Tinker Bell	Television film
2015	Brit Awards 2015	Performer	
2017	Sounds Like Friday Night	Guest Host	
2019–2022	Pennyworth	Bet Sykes	Main role (24 episodes)
2019–2020	101 Dalmatian Street	Portia Poodle (voice)	Recurring role (7 episodes)
2020	The Voice Kids UK	Coach / Judge	Series 4
2022	Dangerous Liaisons	Florence de Regnier	
2024	The Great Celebrity Bake Off for SU2C	Contestant	1 episode
2025	The Celebrity Traitors	Contestant	Series 1
2026	Your Song	Judge	

== Tours ==
- Do You Want the Truth or Something Beautiful Tour (2010)
- Fall to Grace Tour (2012–13)
- Paloma Faith Tour (2014–15)
- The Architect Tour (2018)
- The Infinite Things Tour (2021)
- The Age of Optimism Tour (2022)
- The Glorification of Sadness Tour (2024)

== Awards and nominations ==
Year	Organisation	Award	Work	Result
2009	ATC Hitz Awards	Best New Act Female Singer	Herself	Nominated
2010	Clothes Show Style Awards	The Best Dressed Woman of the Year	Herself	Nominated
2010	UK Festival Awards	Best Breakthrough Act	Herself	Nominated
2010	UK Festival Awards	Anthem of the Year	"New York"	Nominated
2011	Brit Awards	British Female Solo Artist	Herself	Nominated
2011	ASCAP Awards	ASCAP College Award	Do You Want the Truth or Something Beautiful?	Won
2011	MPG Awards	UK Single of the Year 2010	Do You Want the Truth or Something Beautiful?	Nominated
2011	UK Music Video Awards	Best Styling in a Video	"Smoke & Mirrors"	Nominated
2012	UK Music Video Awards	Best Pop Video	"Picking Up the Pieces"	Nominated
2012	4Music Video Honours	Best Video	"Picking Up the Pieces"	Nominated
2013	MPG Awards	UK Single Song Release of the Year	"Picking Up the Pieces"	Nominated
2013	MPG Awards	UK Album of the Year	Fall to Grace	Nominated
2013	Brit Awards	MasterCard British Album of the Year	Fall to Grace	Nominated
2013	Brit Awards	British Female Solo Artist	Herself	Nominated
2013	Cosmopolitan Ultimate Women Award	Cosmopolitan's Style Icon	Herself	Won
2014	MP3 Music Awards	The JSB Award	"Only Love Can Hurt Like This"	Nominated
2014	MP3 Music Awards	The HDT Award	"Changing" with Sigma	Won
2014	Urban Music Awards	Best Music Video	"Can't Rely on You"	Nominated
2014	UK Music Video Awards	Best Video Artist	Herself	Nominated
2014	UK Music Video Awards	Best Colour Grade in a Video	"Can't Rely on You"	Nominated
2014	UK Music Video Awards	Best Colour Grade in a Video	"Only Love Can Hurt Like This"	Won
2014	Xperia Access Q Awards	Best Video	"Only Love Can Hurt Like This"	Nominated
2014	World Music Awards	World's Best Album	Fall to Grace	Nominated
2014	Pro Sound Awards	Best Recording Production	A Perfect Contradiction	Won
2014	O2 Silver Clef Awards	Best British Act Award	Herself	Won
2014	Attitude Awards	Music Gong	Herself	Won
2014	Glamour Awards	Best Solo UK Artist	Herself	Won
2015	Brit Awards	British Female Solo Artist	Herself	Won
2015	International Dance Music Awards	Best Dubstep/Drum & Bass Track	"Changing" with Sigma	Nominated
2018	Global Awards	Best Female	Herself	Nominated
2018	Global Awards	Best Appeal	Herself	Nominated
2018	Global Awards	Best British Artist or Group	Herself	Nominated
2018	Brit Awards	British Female Solo Artist	Herself	Nominated
2018	Music Week Awards	Artist Marketing Champaign	Herself	Nominated
2018	Webby Awards	Celebrity/Fan	www.palomafaith.com	Nominated
2019	Brit Awards	British Single of the Year	"Lullaby" (with Sigala)	Nominated
2019	Global Awards	Mass Appeal Award	Herself	Nominated
2019	Music Week Awards	Music & Brand Partnership	Herself (with Škoda)	Won
2019	UK Music Video Awards	Best Choreography	"Loyal"	Nominated
2019	UK Music Video Awards	Best Colour Grading	"Loyal"	Nominated
2019	Shark Music Video Awards	Best Colour Grading	"Loyal"	Nominated
2019	D&AD Awards	Best Production Design	"Loyal"	Nominated
2019	Clio Awards	Music Marketing	Paloma's Bedtime Alexa Skill	Nominated
2020	Attitude Awards	Honorary Gay	Herself	Won
2021	Pop Awards	Song of the Year	"Better Than This"	Nominated
2022	Berlin Music Video Awards	Most Bizarre	"Monster"	Won
2023	British LGBT Awards	Advocacy	Herself	Won
2024	Artist & Manager Awards	The Icon Award	Herself	Won
