= Smoke & Mirrors (Paloma Faith song) =

Single by Paloma Faith

from the album Do You Want the Truth or Something Beautiful?
- Released: 29 October 2010
- Length: 3:07
- Label: Epic
- Songwriters: Alison Clarkson; Steve Robson; Paloma Faith
- Producer: Steve Robson

Paloma Faith singles chronology
"New York" (re-release) (2010)	"Smoke & Mirrors" (2010)	"Picking Up the Pieces" (2012)

Music video
- "Smoke & Mirrors" on YouTube

"Smoke & Mirrors" is a song by English recording artist Paloma Faith from the album Do You Want the Truth or Something Beautiful? (2009). It was released on 29 October 2010, as the fifth and last single from the album. Co-written by Alison Clarkson and Steve Robson who produced the song, "Smoke & Mirrors" only managed to peak at number 140 in the UK.

== Background ==
During an interview on Something for the Weekend on 15 August 2010, Faith confirmed "Smoke & Mirrors" would be the final single from the album, and that she would be filming the video "very soon". At Hylands Park, as part of the 2010 V Festival, she announced that filming for the video has been completed. The video premiered on 11 September, on Faith's official Facebook page. It was released on 31 October 2010. The track was added to Radio 1's B Playlist.

== Chart performance ==
"Smoke & Mirrors" failed to make a big impact in the UK chart, only managed to peak at number 140, making the song Faith's lowest charting single.

== Music video ==
The music video for the song was uploaded to YouTube on 10 September 2010. It was directed by James Copeman. In October 2011, the video for "Smoke & Mirrors" received a nomination for Best Styling in a Video at the UK Music Video Awards. The video features magician Scott Penrose, who Paloma was an assistant to for a period of time.

== Track listing ==
Digital download

1. Smoke & Mirrors – 3:07
2. Smoke & Mirrors (Widower Remix) – 6:03
3. Smoke & Mirrors (Pete Phantom Remix) – 5:49
4. Smoke & Mirrors (True Tiger Remix) – 4:16

== Charts ==
Weekly chart performance
Chart (2010)	Peak position
UK Singles (OCC)	140

== Release history ==
Release dates and formats
Region	Date	Label	Ref.
United Kingdom	29 October 2010	Epic	
