= New York (Paloma Faith song) =

2009 single by Paloma Faith

Single by Paloma Faith

from the album Do You Want the Truth or Something Beautiful?
- B-side: "Luv Ya"
- Released: 10 September 2009
- Length: 3:18
- Label: Epic
- Songwriters: Paloma Faith; Jodi Marr
- Producers: Jodi Marr; George Noriega; Rob Wells

Paloma Faith singles chronology
"Stone Cold Sober" (2009)	"New York" (2009)	"Do You Want the Truth or Something Beautiful?" (2009)

Music video
- "New York" on YouTube

"New York" is a song by English recording artist Paloma Faith from her debut studio album Do You Want the Truth or Something Beautiful? (2009). Released on 10 September 2009, it features a sweeping gospel chorus by the London-based Souls of Prophecy Gospel Choir. The song was re-released in a new remix featuring rapper Ghostface Killah.

== Critical reception ==
BBC chart blog gave the song a more positive review than her previous single and rewarded it with 4 stars. Digital Spy gave the song 3/5 stars and a less positive rating than "Stone Cold Sober": "New York", Faith's follow-up, is a rather more straightforward offering than its predecessor. The lyrics tell the tale of a girl who loses a guy to "another lady", but sadly for Paloma the lass in question isn't a flesh-and-blood adversary, but actually the Big Apple. It's a much bigger target of course, but one that's harder to hit with a swinging vintage handbag. Despite its sweeping strings and soaring vocals, "New York" is a shade unremarkable compared to her debut, but it still manages to whet the appetite for Faith's upcoming album.

== Chart performance ==
"New York" is Faith's fourth most successful single to date, behind "Only Love Can Hurt Like This", "Picking Up the Pieces" and "Can't Rely on You" charting in the top forty in six different countries. It debuted on the UK Singles Chart at 21, the following week, it fell to 31, then rose 16 places to 15 on its third week, which became its peak position. "New York" stayed eleven weeks in the UK chart. The song also reached number 54 in Germany, 12 in Ireland, 13 in Switzerland, 8 in Finland, 29 in Denmark and number 28 in Sweden.

== Music video ==
The music video was shot at a London bowling alley and features professional bowlers. The director was Vaughan Arnell, who also directed the video to Robbie Williams' song, Bodies. The video was released on 2 August 2009.

== Track listing ==
Digital download
No.	Title	Length
1.	"New York"	3:18
2.	"Luv Ya"	2:49

== Charts ==
=== Weekly charts ===
"New York" weekly chart performance
Chart (2009–2010)	Peak position
Denmark (Tracklisten)	29
Finland (Suomen virallinen lista)	8
Germany (GfK)	54
Ireland (IRMA)	12
Scotland (OCC)	11
Sweden (Sverigetopplistan)	38
Switzerland (Schweizer Hitparade)	15
UK Singles (OCC)	15

=== Year-end charts ===
"New York" year-end chart performance
Chart (2009)	Peak position
UK Singles (OCC)	181

== Certifications ==
"New York" certifications
Region	Certification	Certified units/sales
United Kingdom (BPI)	Gold	400,000^{‡}
^{‡} Sales+streaming figures based on certification alone.

== Release history ==
"New York" release history
Region	Date	Label	Ref.
United Kingdom	13 September 2009	Epic	
Germany	29 January 2010	Epic	

== Ghostface Killah remix ==
"New York"

Single by Paloma Faith featuring Ghostface Killah
- B-side: "New York" (BBC Radio 2 Live) "Do You Want the Truth or Something Beautiful?" (Widower Remix)
- Released: 1 August 2010
- Length: 3:18
- Label: Epic
- Songwriters: Paloma Faith; Jodi Marr
- Producers: Jodi Marr; George Norigea; Rob Wells

Paloma Faith singles chronology
"Keep Moving" (2010)	"New York" (2010)	"Smoke & Mirrors" (2010)

Ghostface Killah singles chronology
"Guest House" (2009)	"New York" (2010)	"2getha Baby" (2010)

In June 2010, Faith announced that she would release a new remix of the song featuring an appearance from American rapper Ghostface Killah. The song was released on 1 August 2010.

=== Critical reception ===
The remix received mixed responses, multiple critics said that the song has been ruined by the rap. In 2012, Faith remarked that she thought the collaboration with Ghostface Killah was unnecessary, and that she felt he did not know what the song was about when he wrote the rap accompaniment.

=== Charts performance ===
Due to the lack of airplay, the song entered the UK Singles Chart at 82 on 7 August 2010. However it then climbed to 44 in its second week on the chart. The original was played on radio during the re-release of this track. It spent five weeks on the chart.

=== Track listing ===
Digital download
No.	Title	Length
1.	"New York (feat. Ghostface Killah)"	3:21
2.	"New York (BBC Radio 2 Live)"	3:15
3.	"Do You Want The Truth Or Something Beautiful (Widower Remix)"	5:52

=== Charts ===
"New York" chart performance
Chart (2010)	Peak position
Scotland (OCC)	42
UK Singles (OCC)	44
