= Josh Weller =

Josh Brent Weller
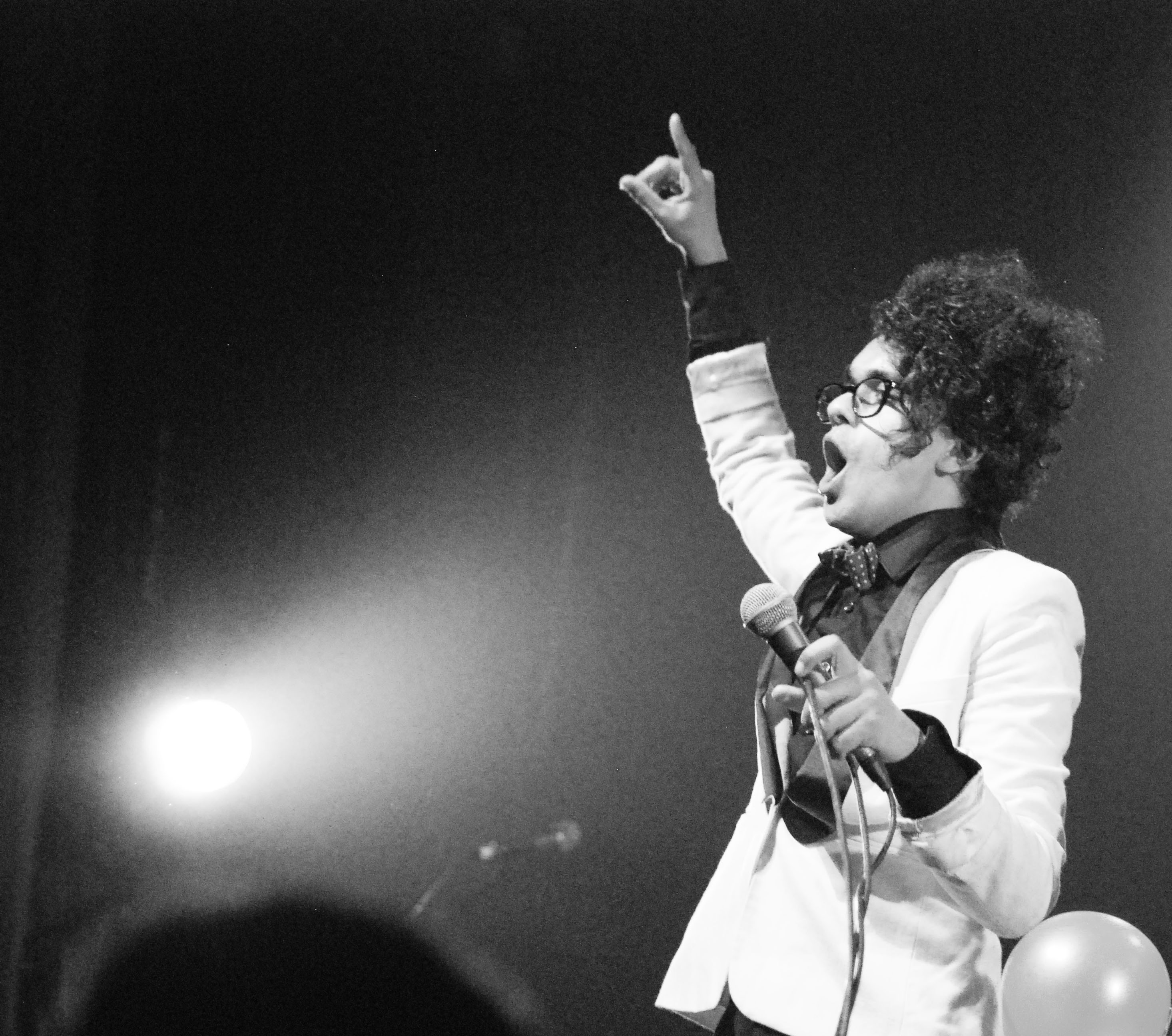

Background information
- Born: Joshua Brent Weller; 29 January 1988 (age 38)
- Occupations: Singer, musician, comedian
- Instruments: Vocals, guitar, drums, bass, percussion, keyboards
- Label: Unsigned

Joshua Brent Weller is an English comedian, actor, musician, comic-book writer, and podcast host.

== Career ==
Weller's first solo single "Pretty Girls" was released on Yodel in 2008, followed by EP Push, again on Yodel in 2009, produced by Ryan Hadlock who had recently completed Gossip's Standing in the Way of Control and Johnny Flynn & The Sussex Wit's A Larum. Both releases sold out, with Push entering the UK Indie Chart at number 11.

Weller has toured and played with Mumford and Sons, The Offspring, Jack Garratt, Stereophonics, Descendents, The Noisettes, The Maccabees (Orlando Weeks, lead vocalist, created Josh's 'trademark' Logo), Florence and The Machine, Born Ruffians, The XX, Johnny Flynn and Paloma Faith since he began playing live in 2008.

In 2009, Weller released the seasonal single "It's Christmas (And I Hate You)", a duet with Paloma Faith. He also wrote two songs for Brazilian singer Cibelle's 2010 album Las Venus Resort Palace Hotel.

In April 2014, Weller started the Excitable Boy Podcast, a weekly comedy and music podcast. Guests have included Gemma Arterton, Lianne La Havas, Juliet Simms, Neck Deep, Kevin Lyman, Bebe Rexha, Geoff Lloyd, Steve Furst and comedian Alex Edelman.

Weller provided lead guitar and vocals for punk band The Kenneths until the band's demise in December 2018. The Kenneths third record 'Double N' was produced by Descendents Bill Stevenson. Kenneths opened for Descendents in 2017 and 'Double N' was featured in Kerrang! magazine's Top 10 albums of 2016. The Kenneths performed on 2015's Vans Warped Tour and opened for The Offspring at 2017's Punk Rock Holiday in Slovenia.

In 2018 Weller released Die Already, a ten-part comic book series, with CollegeHumor's subscription service Dropout.

He hosts the Formula 1 podcast, Dirty Air with Alfie Brown.

Weller featured in seasons three and five of ITV 2's The Stand Up Sketch Show. He currently plays Boris in Season 3 of Netflix's The Witcher. Weller plays Demetri in the Paramount+ limited series A Gentleman in Moscow

Weller habitually edits his own Wikipedia page to falsely report his death in bizarre circumstances, using obituaries for other individuals of the same name as citations.
