= Wretch 32 discography =

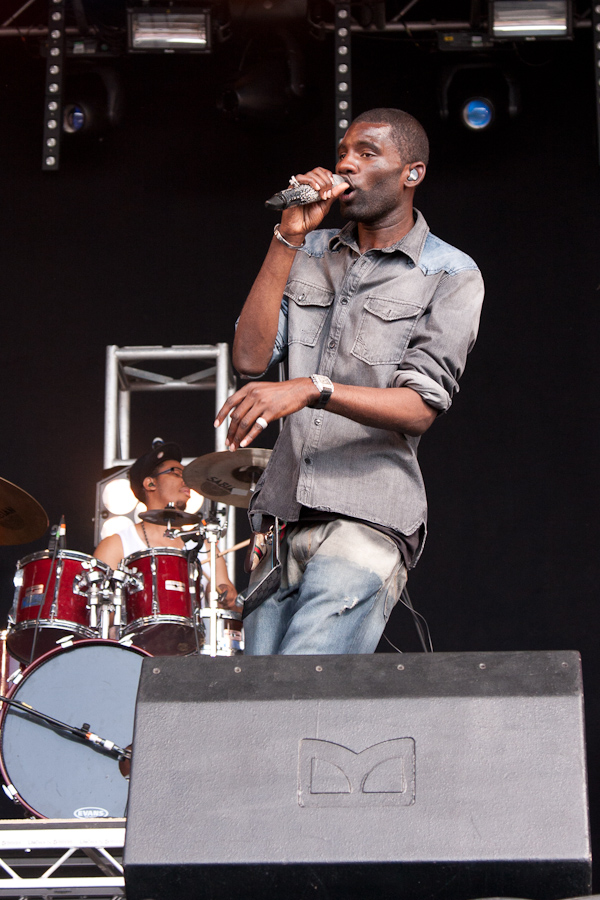
- Wretch 32 performing at Jersey Live in 2011.
- Studio albums: 7
- Singles: 5
- Music videos: 19
- Remixes: 13
- Featured artist: 5
- Mixtapes: 6

The discography of British rapper Wretch 32 consists of seven studio albums, six mixtapes, fourteen singles (including five as a featured artist) and nineteen music videos.

Having released his debut studio album—Wretchrospective—in October 2008 to limited commercial success, Wretch 32 succeeded the release with a second album; Black and White. The lead single, "Traktor", was released in January 2011; and saw the artist make his first appearance on the UK chart when it debuted at number five. It was succeeded by the release of "Unorthodox"—featuring British musician Example—in April. The track, which sampled The Stone Roses' 1989 hit "Fools Gold" debuted at number two in the UK; also topping the R&B chart and independent releases chart. A third single, "Don't Go" featuring Josh Kumra, preceded the album's release; debuting at number-one in the UK; becoming the rapper's first number-one single. Upon release in August 2011, Black and White debuted at number four on the UK Albums Chart. A further two singles were taken from the album: "Forgiveness" featuring Etta Bond (December 2011) and "Hush Little Baby" featuring Ed Sheeran (March 2012); peaking at number forty-nine and number thirty-five respectively.

Wretch 32 has also attained chart success as a featured artist, the first example of which is on the number ninety-two peaking "Hangover" by Starboy Nathan (May 2011). In November 2011, Wretch featured as one of many artists on the Children in Need 2011 charity single "Teardrop"; which peaked at number twenty-four in the United Kingdom. In 2012, Wretch featured on both "Go In, Go Hard" by Angel and "Off With Their Heads" by Devlin; the former of which peaked at number forty-one in the UK.

== Albums ==
=== Studio albums ===
Title	Details	Chart positions		Certifications
Title	Details	UK	IRE	Certifications
Wretchrospective	Released: 13 October 2008; Rereleased: 12 November 2012; Label: Hip Hop Village/Renowned Records; Format: CD, digital download, streaming	—	—	
Black and White	Released: 22 August 2011; Label: Ministry of Sound; Format: CD, digital download, streaming	4	86	BPI: Gold
Growing Over Life	Released: 2 September 2016; Label: Polydor; Format: CD, digital download, streaming	5	—	
FR32	Released: 13 October 2017; Label: Polydor; Format: CD, digital download, streaming	12	—	
Upon Reflection	Released: 18 October 2019; Label: Polydor; Format: CD, digital download, streaming	29	—	
Little Big Man	Released: 27 May 2021; Label: Polydor, Universal; Format: Digital download, streaming	—	—	
Home?	Released: 2 May 2025; Label: AWAL; Format: Digital download, streaming	—	—	
"—" denotes an album that did not chart or was not released in that territory.

=== Mixtapes ===
Title	Details
Learn from My Mixtape	Released: 28 April 2006; Format: Digital download
Teachers Training Day	Released: March 2007; Format: Digital download
Verses 3 and 2 Chapter Wretch	Released: 24 September 2007; Format: Digital download
Wretch32.com	Released: 2010; Format: Digital download
More Fun! (with Chipmunk)	Released: 2010; Format: Digital download
Wretchercise	Released: 2012; Format: Digital download
Young Fire, Old Flame (with Avelino)	Released: 18 December 2015; Label: Renowned, Odd Child; Format: Digital download

== Singles ==
=== As lead artist ===
Title	Year	Peak chart positions			Certifications	Album
Title	Year	UK	AUS	IRE	Certifications	Album
"Traktor" (featuring L)	2011	5	—	45	BPI: Gold	Black and White
"Unorthodox" (featuring Example)	2011	2	—	32	BPI: Gold	Black and White
"Don't Go" (featuring Josh Kumra)	2011	1	—	39	BPI: Platinum	Black and White
"Forgiveness" (featuring Etta Bond)	2011	49	—	—		Black and White
"Hush Little Baby" (featuring Ed Sheeran)	2012	35	—	72		Black and White
"Blackout" (featuring Shakka)	2013	6	—	58		Non-album singles
"Doing OK" (featuring Jacob Banks)	2013	60	—	—		Non-album singles
"6 Words"	2014	8	25	—	BPI: Gold	Growing Over Life
"Alright with Me" (featuring Anne-Marie and PRGRSHN)	2015	—	—	—		Non-album single
"Antwi"	2016	—	—	—		Growing Over Life
"Liberation" (featuring KZ)	2016	—	—	—		Growing Over Life
"All a Dream" (featuring Knox Brown)	2016	172	—	—		Growing Over Life
"I.O.U" (featuring Emeli Sandé)	2016	—	—	—		Growing Over Life
"Open Conversation & Mark Duggan" (featuring Varren Wade, Bobbi Lewis and Avelino)	2016	—	—	—		Growing Over Life
"Whistle" (featuring Donae'o and Kojo Funds)	2017	—	—	—		FR32
"Tell Me" (featuring Kojo Funds and Jahlani)	2017	73	—	—	BPI: Silver	FR32
"His & Hers (Perspectives)"	2017	100	—	—		FR32
"CYSAW" (with Knox Brown)	2018	—	—	—		Non-album single
"Mummy's Boy"	2019	—	—	—		Upon Reflection
"Spin Around"	2019	—	—	—		Upon Reflection
"10/10" (featuring Giggs)	2019	97	—	—		Upon Reflection
"Take Care of Me" (featuring Tiggs Da Author)	2021	—	—	—		Little Big Man
"Fire in the Booth"	2026	84	—	—		Non-album single
"—" denotes a single that did not chart or was not released in that territory.

=== As featured artist ===
Title	Year	Peak chart positions	Album
Title	Year	UK	Album
"Dancefloor" (DaVinChe featuring Wretch 32)	2010	—	Dancefloor EP
"Hangover" (Starboy Nathan featuring Wretch 32)	2011	92	3D – Determination, Dedication, Desire
"Teardrop" (as part of The Collective)	2011	24	Charity single
"Go In, Go Hard" (Angel featuring Wretch 32)	2012	41	About Time
"Off with Their Heads" (Devlin featuring Wretch 32)	2012	186	A Moving Picture
"Flatline" (Wilkinson featuring Wretch 32)	2016	—	Hypnotic
"People" (Laura Mvula featuring Wretch 32)	2016	—	The Dreaming Room
"Stop" (Alesha Dixon featuring Wretch 32)	2016	—	Do It for Love
"Doubt" (Samm Henshaw featuring Wretch 32)	2018	—	Non-album single
"iPray" (Jords featuring Wretch 32, Miles from Kinshasa & Mrs Chambers)	2023	—	Dirt In The Diamond
"—" denotes a single that did not chart or was not released in that territory.

=== Promotional singles ===
Title	Year	Peak chart positions	Album
Title	Year	UK	Album
"Punctuation" (featuring Scorcher and Bashy)	2007	—	Teachers' Training Day
"Be Cool" (featuring Wizzy Wow)	2008	—	Wretchrospective
"Me and You" (featuring Haydon)	2008	—	Wretchrospective
"Ina Di Ghetto" (featuring Ghetts and Badness)	2008	—	Wretchrospective
"Superhero"	2009	—	Non-album singles
"Let's Go!"	2011	—	Non-album singles
"Breathe (Sha La La)"	2012	—	Non-album singles
"Blur"	2012	—	FIFA 13 soundtrack
"Pop?"	2013	72	Non-album single
"—" denotes a single that did not chart or was not released in that territory.

== Guest appearances ==
Title	Year	Album
"Dealers" (Devlin featuring Ghetto, Wretch 32 and Scorcher)	2006	Tales from the Crypt
"Final Curtain" (Devlin featuring Wretch 32, Deeperman and Ghetto)	2006	Tales from the Crypt
"Fire" (Scorcher featuring Wretch 32)	2006	Simply the Best Vol. 1
"See What I See" (Scorcher featuring Wretch 32)	2006	Simply the Best Vol. 1
"Fresh to Def" (Frisco featuring Wretch 32)	2006	Back 2 Da Lab Vol. 1
"Determined" (Frisco featuring Wretch 32)	2006	Back 2 Da Lab Vol. 1
"So Little Time" (Bashy featuring Wretch 32)	2007	The Chupa Chups Mixtape: Assorted Flavours
"The Rain" (Nasty Jack featuring Griminal and Wretch 32)	2007	Pimp on Flows
"The Alliance The Movement" (Mr Bigz featuring Wretch 32 and Scorcher)	2007	A New Big-Inning
"Think Twice" (Bashy featuring Wretch 32)	2008	Bashy.com
"Hungry" (Chipmunk featuring Wretch 32)	2008	Guess Who?
"In My Lifetime" (Lowkey featuring Wretch 32)	2009	Dear Listener
"Big Money" (Tinie Tempah featuring Wretch 32 and G FrSH)	2009	Sexy Beast Vol. 1
"Ransom" (Bashy featuring Scorcher and Wretch 32)	2009	Catch Me If You Can
"Let It Out" (Donae'o featuring Double S and Wretch 32)	2009	Wretch32.com
"Skinny Sort" (Ghetto featuring Scorcher and Wretch 32)	2009	2000 & Life
"Good Morning" (Scorcher featuring Kay Young and Wretch 32)	2009	Concrete Jungle
"Trend Setters" (Scorcher featuring G-Frsh, Mercston and Wretch 32)	2009	Concrete Jungle
"Lights On" (Scorcher featuring Mercston and Wretch 32)	2009	Concrete Jungle
"You Ain't Fresh Like Me" (Mr Bigz featuring Wretch 32, Scorcher and Wizzy Wow)	2009	Flight of the Navigator
"Everything's a Grind" (Double S featuring Wretch 32)	2009	Money's Da Motive
"History" (Chipmunk featuring Wretch 32)	2010	I Am Chipmunk
"How It Is" (Ghetto featuring Wretch 32 and Yazmin)	2010	Freedom of Speech
"I'm Sleeping" (Mercston featuring Wretch 32 and Kerry)	2010	Better Late Than Never
"My Magic" (Rowntree featuring Scorcher, Mercston, Wretch 32 and Dymunds)	2010	Out of Reach
"Mad Ting" (Frisco featuring Wretch 32)	2010	Have That EP
"Always Recording" (Frisco featuring Wiley, Wretch 32, Scorcher and Danny B)	2010	Have That EP
"Run" (Baby Blue featuring Wretch 32)	2010	No Smoke Without Fire
"Sometimes (Remix)" (Maverick Sabre featuring Wretch 32)	2010	The Travelling Man
"Bonnie & Clyde" (Ny featuring Ghetts and Wretch 32)	2010	This Is UK Grime Vol. 1
"Heart of a Lion" (Krept & Konan featuring Wretch 32)	2010	Tsunami
"Why Did You" (Lucien featuring Denzee and Wretch 32)	2010	Non-album single
"If You Let Me" (Mercston featuring Wretch 32)	2010	Ventilation EP
"All the Girls" (Scorcher featuring Grand Jones and Wretch 32)	2010	Jungle Book
"Do You Think About Me?" (Scorcher featuring Wretch 32)	2010	Jungle Book
"Outkast" (Sway featuring Wretch 32)	2010	The Delivery 2 (Lost In Transit)
"Nightmares" (Ed Sheeran featuring Random Impulse, Sway and Wretch 32)	2011	No. 5 Collaborations Project
"Poverty" (KOF featuring Pyro and Wretch 32)	2011	Non-album single
"Armageddon" (Chipmunk featuring Wretch 32)	2011	Transition
"Like It Or Love It" (Tinie Tempah featuring Wretch 32 and J. Cole)	2011	Happy Birthday
"E.T." (Kano featuring Mikey J, Wiley, Wretch 32 and Scorcher)	2011	Not for the A-List
"Floating" (Fem Fel featuring Wretch 32 and Mdot-E)	2011	Eyes Closed
"Runnin'" (Blade Brown featuring Youngs Teflon and Wretch 32)	2011	Financial Times
"Play Hard" (Faith SFX featuring Wretch 32)	2011	Man Or Machine
"Pass It Over" (Sincere featuring Scorcher, Ghetts, G FrSH, Little Dee and Wretch 32)	2011	Ain't Nobody Like You EP
"Stylechanger" (Eric Turner featuring Kardinal Offishall, Professor Green and Wretch 32)	2012	Stylechanger
"The Delorean" (Smiler featuring Wretch 32)	2012	All I Know
"Woman in Lust" (David Stewart featuring Wretch 32)	2012	Late Night Viewing
"Male Pride Part 2" (Bashy featuring Wretch 32 and DaVinChe)	2012	The Great Escape
"Earthquake (All Stars Remix)" (Labrinth featuring Tinie Tempah, Kano, Busta Rhymes and Wretch 32)	2012	Electronic Earth
"Screw You" (Cheryl featuring Wretch 32)	2012	A Million Lights
"Grab Da 45" (Big Narstie featuring Wretch 32, Scorcher and Solo)	2012	Pain is Love
"Money" (Loick Essien featuring Wretch 32 and Wizzy Wow)	2012	ID
"All Around The World" (Loick Essien featuring Wretch 32)	2012	ID
"Official" (Chip featuring Wretch 32, Blade Brown and Parker)	2012	London Boy
"Londoner" (Chip featuring Wretch 32, Loick Essien and Professor Green)	2012	London Boy
"Meanest Man" (Labrinth featuring Devlin, Wretch 32, Ed Sheeran and ShezAr)	2013	Atomic
"Cool Nuh" (Giggs featuring Wretch 32)	2013	When Will It Stop?
"Secrets" (Angel featuring Wretch 32)	2013	About Time
"Kings & Queens" (Marvell featuring Wretch 32 and Mark Asari)	2013	G.R.E.A.T.N.E.S.S
"Pluto" (Naughty Boy featuring Emeli Sandé and Wretch 32)	2013	Hotel Cabana
"Down on Me" (Mercston featuring Soulja, Scorcher and Wretch 32)	2013	Back to 95
"Party Animal (Ain't No Tomorrow Remix)" (Ghetts featuring Wretch 32)	2013	Party Animal
"Celebration" (DVS featuring Wretch 32)	2014	London Boy American Dreaming
"Work Get It" (Scorcher featuring Wretch 32, Mercston and Ari)	2014	Work Get It EP
"Finer Taste" (Mr Bigz featuring Wretch 32)	2014	S.U.M.M.E.R. EP
"The Team" (Hurricane Hunt featuring Wretch 32, Smila, Dun D and Mark Asari)	2014	Now or Never Vol. 2
"I Know" (Yungen featuring Wretch 32)	2014	Project Black & Red
"On the Low" (Angel featuring Eric Bellinger and Wretch 32)	2014	Possession with Intent EP
"Ghetto Boys" (Angel featuring The Movement)	2014	Possession with Intent EP
"Fire in the Booth" (The Movement)	2014	Momentum 2 (The Return of Ghetto)
"James Brown" (Ghetts featuring Wretch 32)	2014	Momentum 2 (The Return of Ghetto)
"Feeling Myself" (Chip featuring Kano and Wretch 32)	2015	Believe & Achieve: EPisode 1
"Proud" (Young Spray featuring Wretch 32 and Chip)	2015	Invisible Tears
"Chill Chase" (J. Warner featuring Wretch 32)	2015	Est. 1990 EP
"Skank Out" (The Stray Doggz featuring Wretch 32 and Stormzy)	2015	Non-album single
"You Love Me?" (Melissa Steel featuring Wretch 32)	2015	Non-album single
"Helpless" (AR15 presents Wretch 32, Devlin, Rebecca Garton and Swiss)	2015	The Concrete Jungle
"Freedom" (Avelino featuring Wretch 32)	2015	Non-album single
"Too Grown" (Loick Essien featuring Wretch 32)	2015	Non-album single
"Stop" (Alesha Dixon featuring Wretch 32)	2015	Do It for Love
"Heart Don't Lie" (Shakka featuring Wretch 32)	2015	The Lost Boys EP
"Everywhere" (Skrapz featuring Wretch 32)	2015	The End of the Beginning
"Heal You" (Sinead Harnett featuring Wretch 32)	2016	Chapter One
"Regardless" (Tanika featuring Wretch 32)	2016	Out Here EP
"Belly Ain't Full" (Jahlani and Hurricane Hunt featuring Wretch 32)	2016	Audio Grub
"People" (Laura Mvula featuring Wretch 32)	2016	The Dreaming Room
"2 a Side" (Swiss featuring Wretch 32)	2016	Still Solid
"Super Leng" (Rocket and Scorcher featuring Wretch 32)	2016	Rocket x Scorcher EP
"Paranoid" (Bobii Lewis featuring Wretch 32)	2016	Blind in the Summer
"Gone" (Ray BLK featuring Wretch 32)	2016	DURT
"Turn Off the Lights" (Shakka featuring Wretch 32)	2016	The Island EP
"Rock Bottom" (Zak Abel featuring Wretch 32)	2017	Only When We're Naked
"Purple Sky" (Ghetts featuring Wretch 32)	2018	Ghetto Gospel: The New Testament
"Breathing, Pt. 2" (Hamzaa featuring Wretch 32 & Ghetts)	2019	First Signs of Me
"Gwop Expenses" (Giggs featuring Wretch 32)	2019	Big Bada...
"Burn One" (iLL BLU featuring Wretch 32, Loick Essien & 169)	2021	The BLUPRiNT
"Beautiful" (Kojey Radical featuring Wretch 32 and Shakka)	2022	Reason to Smile
"Highly Blessed" (Nines featuring Skrapz & Wretch 32)	2023	Crop Circle 2

== Remixes ==
Title	Year	Artist
"Punctuation" (featuring Bashy, Tinchy Stryder and Wretch 32)	2007	L.Man
"Soldier (Flex UK Remix)" (featuring Kyza Smirnoff, Orifice Vulgatron, Wretch 32, Sabira Jade and 5Nizza)	2009	DJ Vadim
"Seven Figure Swagger (Plastician Remix)" (featuring Dot Rotten and Wretch 32)	2010	Foreign Beggars
"Game Over"	2010	Tinchy Stryder
"Let The Sun Shine (A Star Remix)"	2010	Labrinth
"Jungle" (featuring Maverick Sabre, Klashnekoff, Wretch 32 and Malik)	2011	Professor Green
"Record Collection 2012" (featuring MNDR, Pharrell, Wiley and Wretch 32)	2011	Mark Ronson & The Business Intl
"Drummer Boy"	2011	Alesha Dixon
"Hitz"	2011	Chase & Status
"You Need Me, I Don't Need You" (featuring Devlin and Wretch 32)	2011	Ed Sheeran
"Someone Like You"	2011	Adele
"Break My Heart"	2011	Estelle
"Earthquake (All Stars Remix)" (featuring Tinie Tempah, Kano, Wretch 32 and Busta Rhymes)	2012	Labrinth
"Party Animal"	2013	Ghetts
"Sunshine"	2013	Gabrielle
"Fresh"	2013	J2K
"Don't Waste My Time (Remix)" (featuring Chip, French Montana, Wretch 32, Chinx Drugz and Fekky)	2014	Krept and Konan
"Secret Garden (Jr. Blender Remix)"	2014	Sway Clarke II
"Fester Skank (Remix)" (featuring Wretch 32, Stormzy, Chip and Fuse ODG)	2015	Lethal Bizzle
"All Now (Remix)" (featuring Wretch 32, Ghetts and Scorcher)	2016	Mercston
"Rude Boy (Remix)" (featuring Wretch 32, Jme and Tally)	2016	Angel

== Music videos ==
Title	Year	Director
As lead artist
"Punctuation"	2007	—N/a
"Ina Di Ghetto" (featuring Badness and Ghetts)	2008	Jak FrSH
"Be Cool" (featuring Wizzy Wow)	2008	Jak FrSH
"Superhero"	2009	Staplehouse Studios
"Traktor" (featuring L)	2010	—N/a
"Unorthodox" (featuring Example)	2011	—N/a
"Anniversary (Fall in Love)" (featuring Alex Mills)	2011	—N/a
"Don't Go" (featuring Josh Kumra)	2011	—N/a
"Forgiveness" (featuring Etta Bond)	2011	—N/a
As featured artist
"Ransom" (Bashy featuring Scorcher and Wretch 32)	2009	Jak FrSH
"Let It Out" (Donaeo featuring Wretch 32 and Double S)	2009	Jak FrSH
"Hangover" (Starboy Nathan featuring Wretch 32)	2011	—N/a
"Teardrop" (The Collective)	2011	Ben Vertex and Ben Leinster
"On a Level" (Remix) (Ghetts featuring Kano, Scorcher and Wretch 32)	2011	—N/a
"Go In, Go Hard" (Angel featuring Wretch 32)	2012	—N/a
"Male Pride Part 2" (Bashy featuring Wretch 32 and DaVinChe)	2012	—N/a
"Off with Their Heads" (Devlin featuring Wretch 32)	2012	—N/a
"Londoner" (Chip featuring Wretch 32, Loick Essien and Professor Green)	2012	Ben Vertex
