= Maiday =

- Also known as: Maiday
- Born: Rachel Moulden; Worcestershire, England
- Origin: London, England
- Genres: Electropop; electronica; trip hop
- Occupations: Singer, songwriter, record producer
- Label: Interscope

Rachel Moulden, better known as Maiday (stylized as MΔîDΔY), is an English singer-songwriter from Worcestershire, now living in Bow, East London.

== Biography ==
Maiday has written for a number of other artists including Wretch 32, Leona Lewis, Girls Aloud and Josh Kumra. She co-wrote and produced the UK number one single "Don't Go" for Wretch 32 and her vocals have been featured on a number of international hits including "Fade" by Jakwob that became a top 40 hit on the UK Singles Chart and on "Skydive" by Chuckie, a dance hit that has charted on European mainstream charts, notably in Belgium, France and Denmark. She has also featured on "One Way", a collaboration with Naughty Boy featuring Mic Righteous on Naughty Boy's 2013 album Hotel Cabana.

== Discography ==
=== As lead artist ===
Year	Song	Album
2016	"Wish You'd Met Me First"	Non-album singles
2017	"I Still Get to You"	Non-album singles

=== As featured artist ===
List of singles as featured artist, with selected chart positions, showing year released and album name
Title	Year	Peak chart positions				Album
Title	Year	BEL (Tip)	FRA	DEN	UK	Album
"Fade" (Jakwob featuring Maiday)	2013	16	—	—	35	Non-album singles
"Skydive" (Chuckie featuring Maiday)	2013	26	53	35	—	Non-album singles
"—" denotes a recording that did not chart or was not released in that territory.

=== Other appearances ===
Year	Song	Album
2012	"Adagio for Strings" (Bastille featuring Maiday)	Other People's Heartache
2012	"Big Love" (True Tiger featuring Maiday)	Eye of the Tiger, Vol. 2
2013	"White & Black" (Josh Kumra featuring Maiday)	Good Things Come to Those Who Don't Wait
2013	"One Way" (Naughty Boy featuring Mic Righteous and Maiday)	Hotel Cabana
2016	"Problems" (Technimatic featuring Maiday)	Better Perspective

=== Production credits ===
Year	Title	Artist	Album
2011	"Don't Go"	Wretch 32 featuring Josh Kumra	Black and White
