= Ain't Nobody Like You =

Ain't Nobody Like You may refer to:

- "Ain't Nobody Like You" (Miki Howard song), 1992
- "Ain't Nobody Like You" (Patricia Conroy song), 1999
- "Ain't Nobody Like You", a 1979 song from Numbers (Rufus album)
- "Ain't Nobody Like You", by Baker Boy featuring Jerome Farah, from the 2021 album Gela
- Ain't Nobody Like You EP, a 2011 EP by Sincere; see Wretch 32 discography#Guest appearances

== See also ==
- Nobody Like You (disambiguation)
