= Concrete jungle =

A Concrete jungle usually refers to urban areas with very little nature or scenery.

Concrete jungle may also refer to:

== Music ==
=== Albums ===
- Concrete Jungle (David "Fathead" Newman album), 1977
- Concrete Jungle (Dive album), or the title song, 1993
- Concrete Jungle (Nneka album), 2010
- Concrete Jungle (Scorcher album), 2009
- Concrete Jungle (Sway & King Tech album), or the title song, 1990
- Concrete Jungle Vol. 1, or the title song, by South Central Cartel, 1999

=== Songs ===
- "Concrete Jungle", by Bad Omens from The Death of Peace of Mind, 2022
- "Concrete Jungle", by Black Label Society from Shot to Hell, 2006
- "Concrete Jungle", by Bob Marley and The Wailers from Catch a Fire, 1973
- "Concrete Jungle", by Big Youth from Screaming Target, 1973
- "Concrete Jungle", by The Specials from The Specials, 1979
- "In the Jungle (Concrete Jungle)", by The Motels from the soundtrack of the film Teachers, 1984
- "Concrete Jungle", a 2016 single by Au/Ra

== Other media ==
- The Concrete Jungle (1960 film) or The Criminal, a British film directed by Joseph Losey
- The Concrete Jungle (film), a 1982 American women-in-prison film
- The Concrete Jungle (novella), a 2004 short novel by Charlie Stross, collected in The Atrocity Archives
- Concrete Jungle (supplement), a 1985 supplement for the role-playing game Marvel Super Heroes
- Concrete Jungle (video game), a 2015 strategy game
- Concrete Jungle: The Legend of the Black Lion, a 1998 comic book by Christopher Priest

== See also ==
- The Asphalt Jungle, a 1950 film noir
