= Shakka (singer) =

British musician (born 1989)

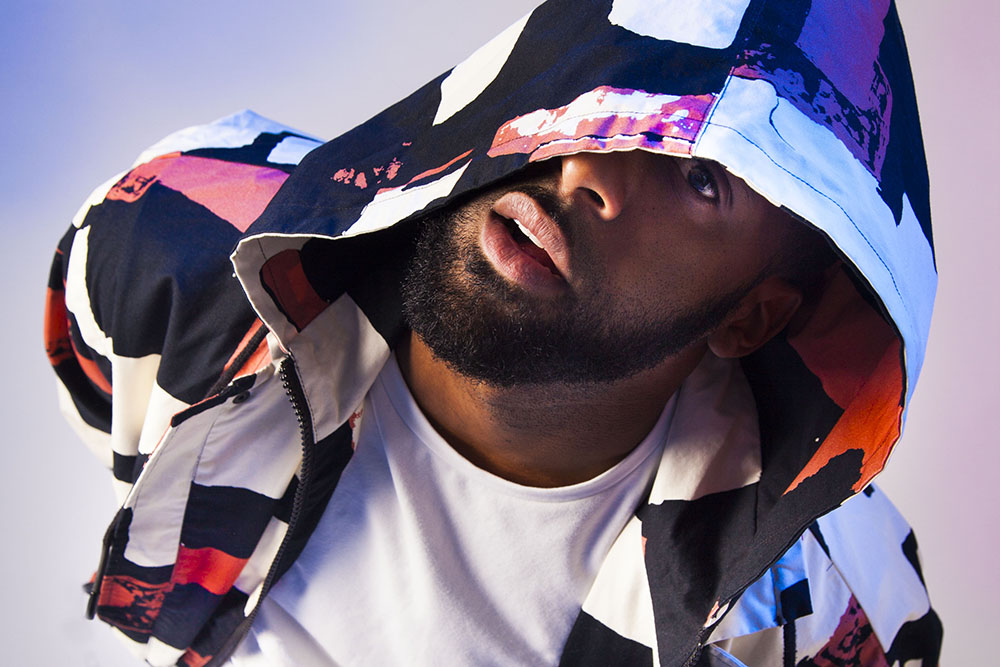

Background information
- Born: Shakka Malcolm Philip; 16 May 1989 (age 37)
- Origin: Notting Hill, London, England
- Genres: Indie; alternative; soul; R&B; hip hop
- Occupations: Singer; songwriter; record producer
- Instrument: Vocals
- Years active: 2009–present
- Labels: Pitched Up; Columbia; Sony
- Website: www.officialshakka.com

Shakka Malcolm Philip (born 16 May 1989), known simply as Shakka, is a British singer, songwriter and record producer signed to Pitched Up, Columbia Records and Sony Music.

Shakka released his debut major label EP The Lost Boys in 2015 which included the hit "Say Nada", with the official video (featuring Jme) having been viewed by over five million people, earning him his first MOBO Award for Best R&B/Soul Act. In 2016, he returned with the follow-up EP, The Island, which earned Shakka his second MOBO Award for Best R&B/Soul Act alongside a spot in The Independent's Ones to Watch 2017 list.

== Career ==
=== 2009–2011: Early projects and Shakkapellas ===
Shakka self-released his first official EP, Foolishness, in July 2009 which was recorded at a local youth centre. With production from both Shakka and TE1, this was Shakka's introduction into the music industry. Shakka consciously decided to sing with his British accent as opposed to an American-influenced accent that many of his contemporaries were using at the time and this formed part of his trademark sound.

He then went on to release a conceptual mixtape, The Shakka Crown Affair, in 2011 which gained Shakka much respect among his peers, solidified him as an emerging creative phenomenon in the UK and brought him to the attention of successful British rapper Wretch 32.

Having developed a fanbase in the UK, Shakka went on to release a series of YouTube covers and mashups entitled Shakkapellas in 2012 which gained him fans globally and put him on the radar of music industry tastemakers.

=== 2013–2014: Rise to fame ===
2013 proved to be a successful year for Shakka, collaborating with various artists, most notably featuring on Wretch 32's single "Blackout", which reached number 6 on the UK Singles Chart. He was also selected to perform on the BBC Introducing stage at Glastonbury Festival, and then toured globally with Basement Jaxx as their guest vocalist.

This year also saw Shakka receive extensive recognition named in MTV's top 20 Unsigned Artists of 2013 list and receiving two MOBO Award nominations; including Best Newcomer. BBC's Radio 1Xtra were early champions of Shakka's music playing some of his Shakkapellas on the station and have supported him throughout his rise to fame.

Noted television performances in 2013 included performing on 'The Graham Norton Show' alongside Wretch 32, as well as on Sunday Brunch and Channel 5's The Wright Stuff.

He followed this growing success with another independent project, the Tribe EP, in 2013. In July 2013 he released the single by "Spin", taken from Tribe. In November 2013 he released the single "Just Want to See You".

In 2013 Shakka was also chosen to perform in, and produce music for, a National Theatre production called "Home" directed by Nadia Fall which ran for two months during late summer. During this production he had the pleasure of sharing the stage with Antonia Thomas (E4's Misfits) and BAFTA award-winning Michaela Coel (E4's Chewing Gum).

=== 2015–present: Breakthrough: The Lost Boys and The Island ===
In 2014, Shakka released a collection of remixes aptly named Shakka B-Sides. It featured the remix of Ten Walls' "Walking with Elephants" featuring Frisco (BBK), which achieved over 8 million views on YouTube. In 2015, Shakka signed to Pitched Up/Sony Music.

In 2015, Shakka released his debut major label EP The Lost Boys and a new single entitled "Say Nada".

Shortly afterwards, he released a remix of "Say Nada" featuring two verses by Jme (BBK), which has accumulated over 5 million YouTube views. The solo version of the song features on his EP The Lost Boys, released 6 November 2015.

In 2016 he returned with the follow-up EP, The Island, which earned Shakka his second MOBO Award for Best R&B/Soul Act alongside a spot on The Independent's Ones to Watch 2017 list.

Shakka featured on Ghetts' new record "Know My Ting", released on 27 January 2017 on Black Butter Records.

Shakka is also the music producer for E4's Chewing Gum TV series, which broadcast its second series in January/February 2017.

On 12 August 2021, Shakka announced the release of his debut album, Road Trip To Venus, which released on 24 September 2021.

== Discography ==
=== Albums ===
Title	Details	Peak chart positions
Title	Details	UK
Road Trip to Venus	Released: 24 September 2021; Label: Marathon Artists; Format: Digital download, CD	—

=== Extended plays ===
Title	Details	Peak chart positions
Title	Details	UK
Foolishness	Released: 2009; Label: Self-released; Format: Digital download, CD	—
Tribe	Released: 5 July 2013; Label: Self-released; Format: Digital download	—
The Lost Boys	Released: 6 November 2015; Label: RME Records; Format: Digital download	144
The Island	Released: 10 November 2016; Label: Sony Music Entertainment; Format: Digital download	17
"—" denotes an album that did not chart or was not released in that territory.

=== Mixtapes ===
Title	Mixtape details
The Shakka Crown Affair	Released: 2011; Label: Self-released; Format: Digital download

=== Singles ===
==== As lead artist ====
Title	Year	Peak chart positions	Certifications	Album
Title	Year	UK	Certifications	Album
"Sooner or Later"	2012	—		Tribe
"Spin"	2013	—		Tribe
"Just Want to See You"	2013	—		Tribe
"When Will I See You Again"	2014	—		Non-album single
"Say Nada" (featuring Jme)	2015	75	BPI: Silver	The Lost Boys
"I Love the Way" (featuring Mr. Vegas)	2016	—		The Island
"Don't Call Me"	2016	—		The Island
"Rollin'" (featuring Frisco)	2017	—		Non-album singles
"Heart the Weekend"	2017	—		Non-album singles
"Man Down" (featuring AlunaGeorge)	2018	25	BPI: 2× Platinum	Non-album singles
"Sugar Cane"	2018	—		Non-album singles
"Too Bad Bad" (featuring Mr Eazi)	2019	—		Non-album singles
"SOS"	2019	—		Non-album singles
"Rest of My Life" (with Sigma)	2020	—		Non-album singles
"—" denotes a single that did not chart or was not released in that territory.

==== As featured artist ====
Title	Year	Peak chart positions				Certifications	Album
Title	Year	UK	UK Dance	UK Indie	SCO	Certifications	Album
"Blackout" (Wretch 32 featuring Shakka)	2013	6	3	3	10		Non-album singles
"If Only" (Show N Prove featuring Shakka)	2014	—	—	—	—		Non-album singles
"Playground" (Lethal Bizzle featuring Shakka)	2015	79	—	—	—		Non-album singles
"Different Kind" (Frisco featuring Shakka)	2015	—	—	—	—		Non-album singles
"Wide Awake" (Idris Elba featuring Shakka)	2015	—	—	—	—		Murdah Loves John
"I'm a Pro" (Nick Brewer featuring Shakka)	2016	—	—	—	—		Non-album singles
"Know My Ting" (Ghetts featuring Shakka)	2017	—	—	—	—		Non-album singles
"Bridge over Troubled Water" (as part of Artists for Grenfell)	2017	1	—	—	1	BPI: Silver	Non-album singles
"Take Over" (Da Beatfreakz featuring Mr Eazi, Seyi Shay & Shakka)	2018	—	—	—	—		Non-album singles
"Certified" (Wiley featuring Shakka)	2018	—	—	—	—		Godfather II
"Run Tings" (ROMderful featuring Shakka & Dounia)	2019	—	—	—	—		Press L To Continue
"Badman Walking Through" (Jme featuring Shakka & P Money)	2019	—	—	—	—		Grime MC
"—" denotes a single that did not chart or was not released in that territory.

=== Guest appearances ===
Title	Year	Artist(s)	Album
"This Groove"	2010	Incisive	In-ci-sive
"I'm Just Trying"	2010	Incisive	In-ci-sive
"Just Wait"	2010	Incisive	In-ci-sive
"Release"	2010	Incisive	In-ci-sive
"Do Your Thing"	2011	Incisive, Muneshine	Him & Her
"More Fire"	2013	Angel	About Time
"Rock This Road"	2014	Basement Jaxx	Junto
"Lost Away"	2015	Sigma	Life
"Sober"	2015	Incisive	FM
"Dreams / Sunshine"	2016	Wretch 32, Pantha	Growing Over Life
"Get Mine"	2016	Midas Hutch	The High
"Bingo"	2017	Donae'o, Ghetts	Sixteen
"Jungle"	2017	Donae'o	Sixteen
"Friday to Sunday"	2017	Cadet	The Commitment 2
"My Size"	2017	Fekky	El Classico
"No Drama"	2017	Not3s, Tinie Tempah	Take Not3s
"Push"	2017	Incisive	Split, Vol. 1
"Don't Call Me"	2017	Young Thug, Carnage	Young Martha
"Mandem"	2017	Jay Prince	Late Summers
"Under Construction"	2018	Stylo G	Ten Years On
"At Least You Know"	2018	Jarreau Vandal	Anthology
"Womba"	2019	Sarkodie, Herman Suede	Black Love
"Beautiful"	2022	Kojey Radical, Wretch 32	Reason to Smile

== Awards and nominations ==
Year	Organisation	Nominated work	Award	Result
2013	MOBO Awards	Wretch 32 ft. Shakka - "Blackout"	Best Song	Nominated
2013	MOBO Awards	Shakka	Best Newcomer	Nominated
2015	MOBO Awards	Shakka	Best R&B/Soul	Won
2015	UMA Awards	Shakka	Best R&B/Soul	Won
2015	UMA Awards	Shakka feat. JME - "Say Nada"	Best Collaboration	Won
2016	MOBO Awards	Shakka	Best R&B/Soul	Won
