= Hush Little Baby (Wretch 32 song) =

Single by Wretch 32 featuring Ed Sheeran

from the album Black and White and +
- Released: 27 May 2012
- Recorded: 2011
- Genre: British hip hop; alternative rock; pop rock
- Length: 3:56
- Label: Ministry of Sound; Levels
- Songwriters: Jermaine Scott; Ed Sheeran; Iain James; Tom Barnes; Pete Kelleher; Ben Kohn
- Producer: TMS

Wretch 32 singles chronology
"Go In, Go Hard" (2012)	"Hush Little Baby" (2012)	"Off With Their Heads" (2012)

Ed Sheeran singles chronology
"Small Bump" (2012)	"Hush Little Baby" (2012)	"Dreamers" (2012)

"Hush Little Baby" is a song by English rapper Wretch 32 which appears on his debut studio album, Black and White. The song is track thirteen on the standard edition of the album, and one of eleven collaborations; it is currently set to be released as the fifth and final single from the album on 27 May 2012. The song, which features singer-songwriter Ed Sheeran, was produced by the team TMS and co-written alongside Iain James.

The track debuted at number 87 on the UK Singles Chart and number twelve on the independent chart on 3 September 2011 following strong downloading from the respective album. The song is an adaptation of the American lullaby, Hush, Little Baby. In reviewing the album, BBC Music representative Joseph 'JP' Patterson stated "unlike many other albums where the central MC is joined by several contributors, the collaborations, including Sheeran, Chipmunk and Etta Bond, don't take away any shine from the artist at the core of this release".

== Chart performance ==
Following the release of the album Black and White, the track "Hush Little Baby" debuted at number eighty-seven on the UK Singles Chart following strong downloading. The track also debuted at number twelve on the UK Indie Chart. Following its selection as the fifth single to be taken from Black and White, "Hush Little Baby" re-entered the chart at number ninety-five for the week ending 19 May 2012.

== Track listing ==
Digital download and CD single
No.	Title	Length
1.	"Hush Little Baby" (radio edit)	3:56
2.	"Hush Little Baby" (Fred V & Grafix remix)	5:52
3.	"Hush Little Baby" (Rudimental remix)	5:10
4.	"Hush Little Baby" (Knox Brown remix)	3:54
5.	"Hush Little Baby" (Wideboys remix)	6:49
6.	"Hush Little Baby" (Simon Hunt remix)	4:52
7.	"Hush Little Baby" (instrumental edit)	3:56

== Credits and personnel ==
Adapted from the album liner notes.

- Songwriting – Jermaine Scott, Ed Sheeran, Iain James, Tom Barnes, Pete Kelleher, Ben Kohn
- Production – TMS
- Drums, programming – Tom Barnes
- Guitar – Ben Kohn
- Keyboards, bass – Pete Kelleher
- Mixed – James F. Reynolds
- Assistant mixer – Joachim Walker
- Additional vocals – Ed Sheeran

== Charts ==
Chart (2011–12)	Peak position
Ireland (IRMA)	72
UK Indie (OCC)	1
UK Hip Hop/R&B (OCC)	12
UK Singles (OCC)	35

== Release history ==
Country	Release date	Format	Label
United Kingdom	27 May 2012	CD; digital download	Ministry of Sound; Levels
