= The Academy of Music and Sound =

British music college

The Academy of Music and Sound is an independent popular music college with centres in five locations in England and Scotland. The Academy delivers instrument specific courses validated by local partner college and Universities.

== History ==
The Academy of Music and Sound started was founded in 1994 in Torquay by Kevin Harding, initially delivering Music Technology courses and private instrument lessons. A second centre was opened in 2001 in Birmingham, above Europe's then biggest music shop Sound Control. By 2012, the Academy had a national network of 7 centres, based in Birmingham, Exeter, Southampton, Edinburgh, Glasgow, Swindon and Gateshead, delivering training and education to over 800 students and apprentices.

As of 2012, The Academy has been a successful first round bidder in the Government's Employer Ownership of Skills programme.

== Courses/Qualifications ==
The courses available at the Academy are in Music Practice, Performance, Technology and Production.

- Apprenticeships
- RSL Level 3 (Funded)
- HND (Scotland)
- Foundation Degree
- Foundation Degree in Production
- BA Hons Degree (Student Loans)
- Master's degree
- Validated Teaching Qualifications

== Facilities ==
The Academy of Music and Sound has national endorsement by leading music manufacturers. All amplification, guitar, bass amp and P.A's are supplied by Peavey. Acoustic and electronic drums, keyboards, guitars and bass are supplied by Yamaha. Cymbals are endorsed by Zildjian.

=== Exeter ===
Re-located in 2010 to Coombe Street and opened by legendary Hawkwind’s guitarist Dave Brock.

=== Southampton ===
The Southampton centre opened in 2005 and relocated to the current centre based in the St. Marys area of the city in 2008, Work started in 2015 for the new premises in the high street which opened November 2015.

=== Edinburgh ===
The Edinburgh Centre is based in Edinburgh's creative hub Leith, close to The Shore, at 88 Giles Street.

=== Glasgow ===
The Glasgow centre opened in 2006, based in Jamaica Street.

=== Gateshead ===
Opened in Gateshead in 2010.

== Alumni ==
- Lewis Capaldi – Award winning Edinburgh student apprentice has gone on to be a chart-topping artiste worldwide.
- Tom Andrews – Exeter student signed by American chat show host and American Idol judge Ellen DeGeneres’ record label 11/11 live on her national American chat show.
- Josh Kumra – Swindon student who wrote and featured on No.1 single "Don't Go" with Wretch 32, is signed to Sony RCA.
- Tristan Evans – Exeter student is the drummer in the award-winning band The Vamps
- Eddy Thrower – Southampton student is the drummer in rock giant Lower Than Atlantis

== Activities/master classes ==
The Academy is a host to master-classes by nationally and internationally renowned musicians, producers and managers including: Albert Lee (Eric Clapton, The Everly Brothers), Laurie Jenkins (Kasabian, Beverley Knight), Guthrie Govan (Dizzee Rascal), Ash Soan (Adele, Robbie Williams), Katie Holmes (Professor Green, Lily Allen), Oli Saville and Nathan Curran (Basement Jaxx), Luke Bullen and Arnulf Linder (KT Tunstall), Dave Troke (Overtones), Vintage Trouble, Vula Malinga (Mark Ronson, Sam Sparro), Simon Have (Seal, George Michael), Bruce Findlay (Simple Minds).

== Academic partners ==
- University of Wolverhampton
- North Hertfordshire College
- Stratford College
- Petroc College
- Aylesbury College
- Edinburgh College
- Glasgow Kelvin College
- New College, Swindon
- University of West London
