= Dirty Picture =

2010 single by Taio Cruz

Single by Taio Cruz featuring Kesha

from the album Rokstarr
- Released: April 5, 2010
- Recorded: 2009
- Genre: Dance-pop
- Length: 3:39
- Label: Island
- Songwriters: Taio Cruz; Fraser T. Smith; Kesha Sebert; Lukasz Gottwald
- Producers: Cruz; Smith

Taio Cruz singles chronology
"No Other One" (2009)	"Dirty Picture" (2010)	"Dynamite" (2010)

Kesha singles chronology
"Blah Blah Blah" (2010)	"Dirty Picture" (2010)	"My First Kiss" (2010)

Music video
- "Dirty Picture" on YouTube

"Dirty Picture" is a song by British R&B singer Taio Cruz, which features vocals from American singer Kesha and was released from his second studio album, Rokstarr (2009). The song was written and produced by Cruz alongside Fraser T. Smith, and later released as the album's third single on 5 April 2010. Originally, Cruz wanted the female vocals to be done by Lady Gaga but opted to switch to Kesha due to heavy influence by Dr. Luke and for finding her voice unique. The song was later re-recorded as an album bonus track for Kesha's debut album, Animal (2010), and dubbed the "Kesha edit" or "Dirty Picture Pt. 2". Lyrically, the song is about sending a dirty picture to a significant other whom you miss.

Critical reception of the song was generally positive. Kesha and Cruz's collaboration and vocal work on the track were generally praised, although some critics noted that Kesha overtook the track, outshining Cruz. The song's simple but effective lyrics were also positively received by music critics. Commercially, "Dirty Picture" fared well on the music charts. The song peaked at number six on the UK Singles Chart, and at number ten in Ireland. The song also reached the top forty in Europe, Australia, and New Zealand. The song's accompanying music video was filmed in Los Angeles and London and is presented as taking place in a house party.

A "spanglish version" of "Dirty Picture" was released as a bonus track from Rokstarr Spanish edition features vocals by Mexican pop star Paulina Rubio. It unfolds with "Rubio Latiniz[ing] the half Brazilian R&B singer's track by sensually breathing in her raspy voice."

== Background and composition ==
"Dirty Picture"
"Dirty Picture" is an upbeat dance song that features a heavy synth backing and is reminiscent of Benny Benassi's song, "Satisfaction".

"Dirty Picture" was written and produced by Taio Cruz, in collaboration with Fraser T. Smith. While creating the track Cruz stated that he originally had wanted American singer Lady Gaga to feature on the track alongside himself. Following a meeting with Dr. Luke, Cruz agreed to switch to then upcoming singer Kesha. Luke had been working with Kesha and Cruz found Kesha's voice to be distinctive and opted to switch to her featuring on the track. Cruz commented on his decision, stating: "I was thinking about Lady Gaga at first, then I went to a meeting with Dr. Luke and he was telling me about this new girl he was working with. She hadn't done 'Tik Tok' or anything like that at that point. But I just thought she sounded really cool. A very unique-sounding voice. I like that with artists, that as soon as you hear them on a song on the radio, you know immediately who that is without having to be told. She looked really sexy, and I just thought she was talented. Her voice was awesome. It had this – I hope she won't mind me saying this, but her voice has this kind of yodely quality to it, the way that she does things and the way that she ends words. I just loved that quality about it."

"Dirty Picture" is song composed in the dance genre, that encompasses a techno beat infused in its backing, as well as synthesizers. The song features auto-tuned vocals by Kesha. According to Robert Copsey of Digital Spy, the song's chorus contains "trancey" elements and is reminiscent of Benny Benassi's song, "Satisfaction". Lyrically, Cruz explained the song's message saying, "the song is actually about sending sexy pictures to your significant other, if you miss each other and you can't see each other, you're far away from each other, you send pictures to remind each other of how sexy you are." According to sheet music published at Musicnotes.com by EMI Music Publishing, "Dirty Picture" is written in the time signature of common time, with a moderate beat rate of 125 beats per minute. The song is written in the key of F minor; Cruz' vocal range spans from the note of E♭_{4} to the note of F_{5}.

== Reception ==
=== Critical reception ===
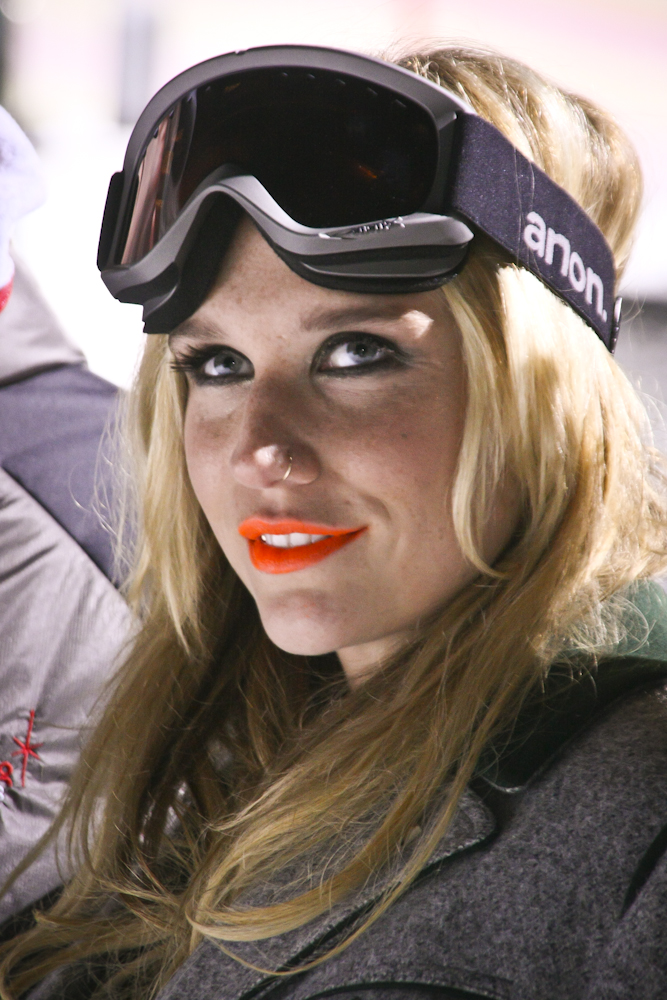
Kesha's performance on the track was generally praised by music critics for her lyrical delivery.

"Dirty Picture" received generally positive reviews from music critics upon its release. Brad Wete of Entertainment Weekly compared the song to Cruz' prior single "Break Your Heart", noting that Cruz had "struck gold" with the song and that "Dirty Picture" was the only song on the album Rokstarr with "equal caliber". In a review of the album, Mike Diver of BBC wrote that the song was "the kind of track Sugababes should be patching up their every difference ever for." In a separate publication from BBC, Fraser McAlpine wrote that although the song's lyrics were dumb, silly and crude, "none of [these] are bad things in themselves." McAlpine complimented the overall sound of Kesha and Cruz's vocal work together on the song commenting that "the jarring clash between Taio's supersmooth soul-gentleman image and Kesha's sloppy drunken nonsense is genuinely fascinating. The song actually transforms from one kind of a thing to another, depending who has their hand on the microphone."

The Guardian's Caroline Sullivan first criticized Cruz for his evident "facelessness" in his music while reviewing his album; she, however, wrote that the song "saves the day" and wrote that it exemplified "British humour by impersonating a camera ('Snap, snap, click!')." Sara Anderson from AOL Radio was positive in her review of the song. Anderson wrote, "Building from strobing, techno back beats, Taio melodically, and bluntly, asks his muse to take a few, er, risque pictures for him, before transitioning into speaking voice with the help of party queen Kesha." David Jeffries of AllMusic listed the song as one of the album's three best tracks, alongside "Break Your Heart" and "Take You Back." Melanie Bertoldi of Billboard praised Cruz' vocal delivery, calling it the "most impressive" on the album.

Robert Copsey of Digital Spy gave the single three out of a possible five stars. Copsey wasn't convinced with Cruz's vocal work on the song commenting that Kesha takes over the track, "Cruz's vocals soar over the verses, his delicate tones fails to dent that deliciously trashy chorus. Luckily, guest star Kesha more than steps up to the mark [...] it's a bit of a shame that it's not her version of the song". Ken Capobianco from The Boston Globe was negative in his review of the song. Capobianco called the song "salacious", writing that it "features that notorious no-talent, Ke$ha, but with its galloping percussion it makes for salacious nonsense." Ash Dosanjh from NME wrote that Cruz' downfall on his album was when he acted as the "player", citing "Dirty Picture" as an example.

=== Chart performance ===
In the United Kingdom, "Dirty Picture" debuted at number 33 on the Hip-Hop/R&B chart upon the release of Rokstarr. Upon its release as a single, it entered at number 20 on the UK Singles Chart on 18 April 2010 — for the week ending dated 24 April 2010. After weeks of steadily ascending the charts, the single reached an eventual peak of number 6 on the chart on 9 May 2010 — for the week ending dated 15 May 2010. The single also peaked at number 3 on the UK R&B Chart.

In Australia, "Dirty Picture" entered at number 31 on the ARIA Singles Chart. On the song's third week on the chart it reached its peak position of 16, where it remained for three weeks. It has since been certified gold by the Australian Recording Industry Association (ARIA) for sales of 35,000 units.

In New Zealand the single entered at number 38 on the New Zealand Singles Chart. The following week, it rose to position 21 and then proceeded to fall off the charts. The song re-entered the charts on the week titled 14 June 2010 at 12; the single reached its peak the following week at position 11. It has since been certified gold by the Recording Industry Association of New Zealand (RIANZ) for sales of 7,500 units. In the United States, "Dirty Picture" entered and peaked on the Billboard Hot 100 at position 96, the same week Rokstarr was released.

In Canada, the song similarly reached its peak on its first week — number 49 on the Canadian Hot 100.

== Music video ==
The music video for "Dirty Picture" was directed by Alex Herron and it premiered online on 24 May 2010. Recording of the video was done in both Los Angeles and in London. Cruz explained the video's simplistic theme and recording saying, "It was shot in this really cool basement in LA. We wanted it to look like a party scene, but not in a typical club, and it was really good fun. Kesha's shots were recorded in London because our schedules were all over the place, and then I shot the rest in LA."

The video opens with Cruz driving a car speeding through the desert. It then cuts to a new scene where Cruz is at a house party where everyone is drinking and sending dirty text messages. Throughout the scenes Cruz is seen taking pictures with different women and singing karaoke. Kesha's vocals cut in and she is seen standing in a bathroom stall standing on top of a toilet "asking that her man do the same [and send a dirty picture]." Once again the video then cuts to scenes of Cruz standing next to his car in the desert singing his verses. The video then cuts back to the party where all of the party goers are seen "sexting, kissing, touching and bumping and grinding as the flashes flash." Kesha's vocals once again cut in and this time she is seen laying on top of the bathroom sink singing her verses. The video ends with Cruz and Kesha standing next to each other telling their loved ones to "click, click, snap" that dirty picture their way.

== Dirty Picture, Pt. 2 ==
A second version of the song, featuring Kesha singing the first verse was included on some editions of her debut album Animal (2010). On the UK digital release of Animal this version of the song is dubbed "Kesha edit". While being interviewed by Digital Spy, Cruz said that Kesha wanted to record an alternative version of the song, "she asked me if she could do a version of the song where she sang the first verse and I thought that was a really cool idea. I really like both versions, and it's good that there are these two different versions out there, because fans of me get more of me on mine and [Kesha] fans get more of her on hers." At the time of the duo recording "Dirty Picture", Kesha was an unknown artist, having not previously released any music at that time.

== Track listing ==
- Australian and New Zealand digital download (EP)
1. "Dirty Picture" (featuring Kesha) – 3:40
2. "Dirty Picture" (clean) – 3:14
3. "Dirty Picture" (Wizzy Wow remix; featuring Kesha and Scorcher) – 3:45
4. "Dirty Picture" (RedTop extended remix; featuring Kesha) – 5:23
- UK CD
1. "Dirty Picture" (featuring Kesha) – 3:40
2. "Dirty Picture" (clean) – 3:14
3. "Dirty Picture" (Wizzy Wow remix; featuring Kesha and Scorcher) – 3:45
4. "Break Your Heart" (the Wideboys remix radio edit) – 3:14
- UK digital download (EP)
1. "Dirty Picture" (clean) – 3:14
2. "Dirty Picture" (Wizzy Wow remix; featuring Kesha and Scorcher) – 3:45
3. "Dirty Picture" (RedTop extended remix featuring Kesha) – 5:23
4. "Dirty Picture" (Paul Thomas remix; featuring Kesha) – 3:37
- Australian digital download (the remixes EP)
1. "Dirty Picture" (Remix, featuring Kesha and Fabolous) – 3:41
2. "Dirty Picture" (Wizzy Wow remix; featuring Kesha and Scorcher) – 3:45
3. "Dirty Picture" (RedTop extended remix featuring Kesha) – 5:23
4. "Dirty Picture" (Paul Thomas remix; featuring Kesha) – 3:37
- Dutch digital download
1. "Dirty Picture" (featuring Kesha) – 3:40
- Canadian and US digital download (the remixes EP)
1. "Dirty Picture" (Dave Audé radio; featuring Kesha) – 3:53
2. "Dirty Picture" (Jason Nevins radio edit; featuring Kesha) – 3:34
3. "Dirty Picture" (Dave Audé club, featuring Kesha) – 7:54
4. "Dirty Picture" (Jason Nevins club; featuring Kesha) – 6:54
5. "Dirty Picture" (Jump Smokers extended mix; featuring Kesha) – 5:13
6. "Dirty Picture" (Dave Audé dub; featuring Kesha) – 6:10
7. "Dirty Picture" (Jason Nevins dubstramental; featuring Kesha) – 6:54
8. "Dirty Picture" (Jump Smokers instrumental; featuring Kesha) – 4:21

== Credits and personnel ==
- Songwriting – Taio Cruz, Fraser T. Smith
- Production – Taio Cruz, Fraser T. Smith
- Engineering – Beatriz Artola
- Mixing – Fraser T. Smith, Neil Tucker
- Mastering – Tom Coyne

Credits adapted from the liner notes of Rokstarr, via Photo Finish Records.

== Charts ==
Chart performance for "Dirty Picture"
Chart (2010)	Peak position
Australia (ARIA)	16
Canada Hot 100 (Billboard)	49
European Hot 100 Singles (Billboard)	25
Ireland (IRMA)	10
Netherlands (Dutch Top 40)	46
Netherlands (Single Top 100)	72
Netherlands (TMF Superchart)	1
New Zealand (Recorded Music NZ)	11
Scottish Singles Sales (Official Charts)	8
UK Singles (Official Charts)	6
UK Hip Hop/R&B (Official Charts)	3
US Billboard Hot 100	96
US Dance Airplay (Billboard)	23
US Dance Club Songs (Billboard)	3
US Pop Airplay (Billboard)	38
US Rhythmic Airplay (Billboard)	36

== Certifications ==
Certifications for "Dirty Picture"
Region	Certification	Certified units/sales
Australia (ARIA)	Gold	35,000^{^}
New Zealand (RMNZ)	Gold	7,500^{*}
United Kingdom (BPI)	Silver	200,000^{*}
^{*} Sales figures based on certification alone.^{^} Shipments figures based on certification alone.

== Release history ==
"Dirty Picture" release history
Region	Date	Format	Version(s)	Label(s)	Ref.
Australia	5 April 2010	Digital download	Original; clean; Wizzy Wow remix; RedTop extended remix	Island	
New Zealand	5 April 2010	Digital download	Original; clean; Wizzy Wow remix; RedTop extended remix	Island	
United Kingdom	3 May 2010	CD	Original; clean; Wizzy Wow remix	Universal; Island	
United Kingdom	3 May 2010	Digital download	Clean; Wizzy Wow remix; RedTop extended remix; Paul Thomas remix	Island	
Australia	21 May 2010	Digital download	The remixes	Island	
Netherlands	21 June 2010	Digital download	Original	Island	
Canada	14 September 2010	Digital download	The remixes	Island	
United States	14 September 2010	Digital download	The remixes	Island	
United States	28 September 2010	Rhythmic contemporary radio	Original	Island Def Jam	
