= Wizzy Wow =

Musician

- Born: Isra Andja-Diumi Lohata; 12 June 1989 (age 36); Sweden
- Genres: Grime
- Occupations: songwriter, musician

Isra Andja-Diumi Lohata (born 12 June 1989), better known as Wizzy Wow, is a songwriter, musician and music-producer under the Renowned Label. He is responsible for such songs as Chipmunk's "Role Model" off the platinum-selling debut album "I Am Chipmunk", Wretch 32's "Never Be Me" featuring Angel from gold-certified "Black and White", Tinie Tempah's "Lucky Cunt" featuring Big Sean off the "Happy Birthday mixtape", Chrisette Michele's "Cherades" featuring 2 Chainz and Taio Cruz's "Dirty Picture" featuring Ke$ha. Other artists he has produced for include Estelle, Roll Deep, Boy Better Know, Mz Bratt and Kano.

== Early life ==
Born in Sweden of African heritage, Wizzy Wow moved to Tottenham, North London, United Kingdom at the age of 10. He speaks of first being inspired to produce music at the age of twelve after being inspired by South London UK garage collective So Solid Crew. He started out producing on fruity loops, a production software strongly tied to the underground rise of Grime music. Growing up in Tottenham on the notorious Tiverton estate alongside rapper Wretch 32, Wizzy Wow also helped form the Grime Collective 'Combination Chain Gang'. Being a self-taught keys player, Wizzy Wow also studied music at Conel College in Tottenham.

== Career ==
Wizzy is most known for his work alongside the UK's leading Grime pioneers and rap artists from the likes of Kano, Wretch 32, Chipmunk, Roll Deep and Tinie Tempah. Early recognition was given when his productions appeared on Wretch 32’s Wretchrospective mixtape [Be Cool + Be Cool Remix] and Chipmunk’s debut platinum-selling "I Am Chipmunk" album [Role Model + I Am Interval].

He currently produces across a range of musical genres including Hip-Hop, R&B and Grime. His productions have been used for advertising campaigns including 'Hard Court High' also featuring Chipmunk for Adidas/Footlocker and Adidas, and also 'Take the Stage' 2012 Olympic Campaign also featuring Wretch 32. His recent writing collaborations have seen him writing and producing on both sides of the Atlantic with Tinie Tempah, Big Sean, Wretch 32, Taio Cruz, 2 Chainz, Chrisette Michele, Estelle, Kano and Roll Deep, his works have amassed over half a million records sold.

== Discography ==
Song	Artist	Credit	Album	Release date	UK Chart
"Know About Me"	King Space	Production	"Know About Me (Heisenberg)" (single)	19 November 2013	N/A
"Alter Ego"	Wretch 32 feat. Kano & Mercston	Production	Wretchercise	15 August 2012	N/A
"Be Cool"	Wretch 32 feat. Wizzy Wow	Feature & Production	Wretchrospective	12 November 2012	N/A
"Be Cool" (Remix)	Wretch 32 feat. Wizzy Wow, Tinie Tempah, Scorcher, Bashy, Sway & Chipmunk	Feature & Production	Wretchrospective	12 November 2012	N/A
"Cherades"	Chrisette Michele feat. 2 Chainz	Production	Audrey Hepburn: The Mixtape	TBC	N/A
"Dirty Picture"	Taio Cruz feat. Ke$ha	Joint-Production	Rokstarr	12 October 2009	6
"I Am (Interval)"	Chipmunk	Production	I Am Chipmunk	23 April 2010	N/A
"Killing Them"	Mz Bratt feat. Wizzy Wow & Roses Gabor	Feature & Production	Elements	5 July 2011	N/A
"Lucky C**t"	Tinie Tempah feat. Big Sean	Production	Happy Birthday	16 December 2011	N/A
"Never Be Me"	Wretch 32 feat. Angel	Production	Black and White	22 August 2011	N/A
"Let Yourself Go"	Wretch 32	Production	Black and White	22 August 2011	N/A
"Role Model"	Chipmunk	Production	I Am Chipmunk	23 April 2010	N/A
"Swagga"	Roll Deep	Production	N/A	N/A	N/A
"The Life"	Estelle	Production	All of Me	24 February 2012	N/A
"You Ain't Fresh Like Me"	Bigz feat. Wretch 32, Scorcher & Wizzy Wow	Feature & Production	Flight of the Navigator	2009	N/A
"Hulk Hogan"	Wretch 32 x Avelino	Production	Young Fire Old Flame	2015	N/A
