= Josh Kumra =

English singer-songwriter

- Born: 20 April 1991 (age 35); Swindon, Wiltshire, England
- Genres: Pop; jazz; blues
- Occupation: Singer-songwriter
- Instruments: Guitar; vocals
- Years active: 2011–present
- Label: Sony Music Entertainment UK
- Website: www.joshkumra.co.uk

Josh Kumra (born 20 April 1991) is an English singer and songwriter.

In 2011, Kumra co-wrote and provided vocals for English rapper Wretch 32's highest-charting single to date, "Don't Go", which reached number one in the UK Singles Chart.

== Biography ==
Kumra grew up in a family home in Swindon, Wiltshire. Kumra is one-quarter Indian (his grandfather was from New Delhi) and started playing the guitar 12 years old, which naturally led to him teaching himself to sing. Kumra is a former student of The Academy of Music and Sound in Swindon.

=== 2011: Breakthrough ===
In early 2011, Kumra moved from Swindon to London to pursue a career in music and in the first month, met Wretch 32 and together, they created the "Don't Go" collaboration which went on to reach number one in the UK charts.

Due to the song's instant success, Kumra joined Wretch 32 to perform the song on one of the UK's only major music TV shows, Later With Jools Holland and at many of the summer's major festivals. Regarding his subsequent appearance at V Festival, he stated that it was one of his biggest highlights; "Me and Wretch performed Don't Go on the same day that it went to number one. It was an incredible feeling; they had to take away the barriers in the tent we were playing in because it was just getting rammed as there were a couple thousand more people than there should've been in there."

=== 2012–present: Good Things Come To Those Who Don't Wait ===
Following his success with Wretch 32, Kumra signed to Sony Records, releasing his debut solo effort on 15 July 2012. The single, 'Helicopters & Planes' had its video premiere on Vevo on 18 May. The track features Roc Nation rapper K Koke.

He has supported many artists, including Gabrielle Aplin and in late 2012, Kumra joined Nina Nesbitt on her tour as a support act – he also supported Lianne La Havas in early 2013. In April 2013, he supported OneRepublic on their European tour.

His debut album Good Things Come To Those Who Don't Wait was released on 22 April 2013, featuring songwriting and production collaborations with Fink, Emeli Sandé, Naughty Boy and Mr Hudson.

“We didn't have a brief, we just did what we wanted," says Josh. "We had total freedom to mix up soul, blues and gospel songwriting, sometimes with big hip hop beats. But there's no production for the sake of it. And ultimately it comes down to me, the bedroom singer-songwriter with a guitar in my hand. That's what I wanted to come across." The album is, he considers, "about my journey, which might sound clichéd, but it's true. The songs are about me, but also about things I've observed. They're love songs, mainly."

Kumra released the EP Pull Me Back In in 2020, which includes the single Don't Know Why.

== Artistry ==
=== Influences ===
Kumra cites Tracy Chapman's self-titled album, The Rolling Stones and Experience by Jimi Hendrix as his three most influential albums whilst growing up and says Eric Clapton is "God" to him and that he would like to duet together someday.

He describes his sound as "kind of 'singer-songwrity'".

== Discography ==
=== Albums ===
Title	Album details
Good Things Come To Those Who Don't Wait	Released: 22 April 2013; Label: Sony Music Entertainment; Format: Digital download, CD

=== Extended plays ===
Title	Album details
iTunes Festival: London 2012	Released: 14 September 2012; Label: Sony Music Entertainment; Format: Digital download
Pull Me Back In	Released: 3 April 2020; Label: ferryhouse; Format: Digital download

=== Singles ===
Year	Title	Album
2012	"Helicopters & Planes" (featuring K Koke)	Non-album single
2013	"Waiting For You"	Good Things Come To Those Who Don't Wait
2013	"The Answer"	Good Things Come To Those Who Don't Wait
2020	"Don't Know Why"	Non-album single

=== As featured artist ===
Year	Title	Peak chart positions	Album
Year	Title	UK	Album
2011	"Don't Go" (Wretch 32 featuring Josh Kumra)	1	Black and White
