= Happy Birthday (mixtape) =

Mixtape by Tinie Tempah
- Released: 16 December 2011
- Recorded: November 2011
- Genre: Hip hop
- Length: 34:29
- Label: Disturbing London
- Producer: 3Mindz; S-X; Lex Luger; Wizzy Wow; Drumma Boy

Tinie Tempah chronology
Foreign Object (2011)	Happy Birthday (2011)	Junk Food (2015)

Happy Birthday is the fourth mixtape released by British rapper Tinie Tempah. The mixtape was released for free download on 16 December 2011 on Disturbing London Records - featuring production from 3Mindz, S-X, Wizzy Wow and Stargate. The mixtape title is Happy Birthday because the mixtape came into production around Tempah's 23rd birthday (November 7). Tracks "Like It or Love It", "Lucky Cunt" and "Till I'm Gone (Remix)" were leaked prior to the mixtape release to create buzz, with "Like It or Love It" receiving minor radio airplay. Happy Birthday features British rappers Chipmunk, Giggs, Wretch 32, G-Frsh, Tinchy Stryder and Krept and Konan, including a variety of American rappers; Soulja Boy, J. Cole and Big Sean, along with Wiz Khalifa, Pusha T and Jim Jones on the "Till I'm Gone" remix (originally released on 29 August 2011). British vocalist J. Warner also makes a guest appearance.

On professional mixtape download site Datpiff, Happy Birthday has been downloaded over 30,000 times.

A music video for "You Know What" was published to YouTube on 3 March 2012. It was directed by Jabari Johnson and features Tinie Tempah rapping in a dark room.

== Track listing ==
No.	Title	Producer(s)	Length
1.	"Happy Birthday" (skit)		0:38
2.	"Mayday" (featuring Chipmunk and Soulja Boy)		3:53
3.	"Leak-a-Mixtape" (featuring Giggs)	Lex Luger	4:50
4.	"Like It or Love It" (featuring Wretch 32 and J. Cole)	S-X	4:04
5.	"Till I'm Gone (Remix)" (featuring Wiz Khalifa, Pusha T and Jim Jones)	Drumma Boy	3:49
6.	"100k" (featuring G FrSH, Tinchy Stryder and Krept and Konan)	S-X	4:24
7.	"Lucky Cunt" (featuring Big Sean)	Wizzy Wow	3:42
8.	"Fuck It I'm Gone" (featuring J. Warner)	3Mindz (Richard "P2J" Isong; Jason "Crumble" Blake; Sean "1da" Wander)	5:13
9.	"You Know What"	S-X	3:56
Total length:			34:29
