= Wretchrospective =

Studio album by Wretch 32
- Released: 13 November 2008; 12 November 2012 (deluxe edition)
- Recorded: 2007–2008
- Genre: Grime; British hip hop
- Length: 65:03
- Label: Wretchro Boys, Hip Hop Village
- Producer: J.F.L.O.W.S, JD, Scorcher, Maniac, Mr. Grand Jones, Chunky B, Wizzy Wow, Thy Maryan, Parker & James

Wretch 32 chronology
Wretchrospective (2008)	Black and White (2011)

Alternate cover
- Physical release sold in retail stores

Singles from Wretchrospective
- 1. "In da Ghetto" Released: 17 August 2008; 2. "Be Cool" Released: 5 November 2008

Wretchrospective is the debut studio album released by British hip hop recording artist Wretch 32. The album was released on 13 October 2008, on the Hip Hop Village label. Not having been released on a major label, the album failed to chart on the UK Albums Chart. "In da Ghetto" and "Be Cool" were released as singles from the album prior to its release. The album features guest appearances from Ghetto, Chipmunk, MC Boachie, Scorcher, Haydon, Badness and Calibar. The video for "In da Ghetto" features appearances from Ghetto and Badness, and the video for "Be Cool" features an appearance from Wizzy Wow.

== Background ==
Production on the album began in January 2007, after the release of Wretch's second mixtape, Teacher's Training Day, which featured guest appearances from Ghetts, Bashy and Scorcher, in 2006. Wretch received his first big break when he was asked to perform at the first annual MP3 music awards in July 2007. Following his performance, he hooked up with several producers from the grime scene and continued work on his debut album. Upon the album's release in November 2008, promotion began with a performance on the BBC Introducing stage of Radio 1's Big Weekend in 2009, where he performed such tracks as "Be Cool", "Take This from Me" and "In da Ghetto". Shortly after the performance, Wretch was signed by Ministry of Sound, and was nominated at the Urban, Grime and Garage Awards for best album with Wretchrospective. On 6 December 2010, Wretch was named as one of the nominees for BBC's Sound of 2011, an annual poll which predicts artists that will progress during the upcoming year. This shortly led towards the release of his major label debut album, Black and White.

"Welcome to My World" was sampled by Jake Gosling on the Ed Sheeran song "Nina" from his second studio album x. The song is about Nina Nesbitt, a former girlfriend of Sheeran's who once toured with him.

== 2012 reissue ==
The album was re-released on 12 November 2012, following the success of his commercial debut release, Black and White. The new deluxe edition features additional appearances from Tinie Tempah, Bashy, Sway and Wiley, in the guise of three new tracks packaged with the album. The deluxe edition was made available as a digital release only, via the iTunes Store and Amazon MP3 services. The album's re-release features an alternative cover to the original, and was officially endorsed by his current record label, Ministry of Sound.

== Track listing ==
No.	Title	Writer(s)	Producer(s)	Length
1.	"Welcome to My World"	Jermaine Scott; Isra Andja-Diumi Lohata; Jay Lee Robert Hippolyte	The J.F.L.O.W.S	5:01
2.	"Wretchrospective" (featuring Vis)	Scott; Vincent Attwah	JD	4:04
3.	"Take This from Me" (featuring Badness)	Scott; Jonathan Welcombe; Tayo Jarrett	The J.F.L.O.W.S & Scorcher	4:01
4.	"Me and You" (featuring Haydon)	Scott; Haydon Cawlin	The J.F.L.O.W.S	3:32
5.	"Chinese Whispers" (featuring Scorcher and Chipmunk)	Scott; Jarrett; Jahmaal Fyffe	The J.F.L.O.W.S	4:20
6.	"Ina Di Ghetto" (featuring Badness and Ghetto)	Scott; Welcombe; Justin Clarke	Maniac	3:54
7.	"Pisces"	Scott	The J.F.L.O.W.S	5:07
8.	"Swaggalicious" (Interlude) (featuring Mr. Grand Jones)	Scott; Grand Jones	Mr. Grand Jones	0:31
9.	"Swaggalicious" (featuring Scorcher)	Scott; Jarrett	Chunky B	3:13
10.	"Be Cool" (featuring Wizzy Wow)	Scott; Lohata	Wizzy Wow	3:36
11.	"On Fire" (featuring J.F.L.O.W.S)	Scott; Johnny Dawley	Chunky B	3:17
12.	"Stop My Pen from Crying" (featuring Darren B)	Scott; Darren Boachie	Scorcher	4:19
13.	"All That I Need"	Scott	The J.F.L.O.W.S	3:41
14.	"The Reason" (featuring P. Nero and Calibar)	Scott; Paul Nero; Calibar; Jarrett	Scorcher	4:13
15.	"Remember the Titan"	Scott	The J.F.L.O.W.S	5:05
16.	"The End Scene"	Scott	The J.F.L.O.W.S	7:15

Deluxe edition bonus tracks
No.	Title	Writer(s)	Producer(s)	Length
17.	"Be Cool" (Remix featuring Wizzy Wow, Tinie Tempah, Scorcher, Bashy, Sway and Chipmunk)	Scott; Lohata; Patrick Okogwu; Jarrett; Fyffe; Ashley Thomas; Derek Safo	Wizzy Wow	5:32
18.	"Superhero" (featuring Wiley)	Scott; Richard Cowie	Thy Maryan	3:14
19.	"Action Man" (featuring Chipmunk, Scorcher, Sneakbo and Calibar)	Scott; Fyffe; Jarrett; Agassi Babatunde Odusina; Calibar	Parker & James	3:04
