= Say Nada =

Single by Shakka featuring Jme

from the album The Lost Boys EP
- Released: 13 April 2015
- Recorded: 2015
- Genre: R&B; hip hop; soul
- Length: 4:09
- Songwriter: Shakka
- Producer: Shakka

"Say Nada" is a song recorded by the British hip hop singer and songwriter Shakka, with Jme. It was released on April 13, 2015, by RME Records as the fourth track from the solo EP, The Lost Boys. The song reached No. 75 on the UK Singles Chart.

== Music video ==
The music video of "Say Nada" was released two weeks after the song was released.
