= Forgiveness (Wretch 32 song) =

Single by Wretch 32 featuring Etta Bond

from the album Black and White
- Released: 11 December 2011
- Recorded: 2011
- Genre: Hip hop; R&B
- Length: 3:38 (single version); 5:07 (album version)
- Label: Ministry of Sound; Levels
- Songwriters: Jermaine Scott; Timothy McKenzie
- Producer: Labrinth

Wretch 32 singles chronology
"Teardrop" (2011)	"Forgiveness" (2011)	"Stylechanger" (2012)

Etta Bond singles chronology
"Forgiveness" (2011)	"Playing with Fire" (2012)

"Forgiveness" is a single from Tottenham-born rapper Wretch 32 that appears on his second album Black and White and features vocals from British and Odd Child Recordings-signed singer Etta Bond. The lyrical content on the song follows Wretch asking forgiveness of those around him as he attempts to pursue his dream – including his son. Cited as his favourite track from the album, the song was selected as the fourth single to see release in the United Kingdom and was released as a digital download on 11 December 2011. The track was edited for the official release, removing the first minute of the track in which producer Labrinth sings his version of the chorus.

== Background ==
Speaking of the track, Wretch described it as "one of [those] tracks where I really spell it out a lot about my Mum and Grandad, it's me asking for forgiveness as I chase my dream". "Forgiveness" was initially recorded in early 2011, following the number-five debut of the album's lead single "Traktor".

The demo, which leaked briefly in March featured vocals from Scottish singer/songwriter Emeli Sandé. The track was then re-recorded by Wretch 32 during the year to feature vocals from Etta Bond, a British singer signed to the producer of the track, Labrinth's, record label Odd Child Recordings. During an appearance on BBC Radio 1's Chart Show, Wretch 32 told host Reggie Yates that the collaboration came about following contact between Wretch and Bond via Myspace.

Wretch was asked the question how he is feeling about the new single, Forgiveness in online magazine Purple Revolver he replied "This is the most personal record on the album for me, on one of my earlier projects I had a song with a similar vibe and it was everyone's favourite song so I promised myself, if I ever got the chance I would make 'Forgiveness' a single. It's not about chart positions...just the music."

== Music video ==
The music video that accompanied the release of "Forgiveness", It received its first play on 4 November 2011 on Flava. The video was then uploaded onto Wretch32TV (Wretch 32's YouTube channel) on 8 November. During the week of 14 November 2011, the music video was rated on MTV UK as MTV's Most Wanted.

The premiere broadcast in Africa of the "Forgiveness" music video was on MTV Base Africa on 12 December 2011.

At three minutes, thirty-nine seconds, the video features an arrange of moody visuals – all of which are shot in and around St Mary Magdalene, Paddington, London, mirroring the lyrical content regarding forgiveness for his career-driven behaviour.

The interior of St Mary Magdalene, Paddington, featured in the "Forgiveness" promo was also used in scenes for Les Misérables featuring Hugh Jackman and the music promo for Jessie J's Do It like a Dude .

When Wretch 32 was asked in Pyromag "Who’s concept was it to be all filmed around and in a church?" Wretch's reply was "Yhh we really wanted it to reflect exactly what we were saying in the song, I think it needed to be gritty and dark to make you feel like wow and I think we managed to do that. Theres two ways to do videos either going with the concept of the song or a completely different one to the song which works sometimes; but this was one of them songs where I thought it would be best to stick to everything and just do it like that."

The music video was commissioned by Ministry of Sound. The team behind the music video are Director Matthew Walker, Producer Benjamin Everingham and Director of Photography Steve Annis.

Additional crew Focus Puller: Ahmet Husseyin, Gaffer: Craig Davies, 1st AD: Oliver Kester, 2nd Camera assistant: Sy Turnball, Grip: Alex Hudson, DIT: Sophie Baggaley, Location Manager: Richard Sanchez, Make up & Hair: Rebecca Wordingham, Production Designer: Anna Graziano, Colourist: Rich Fearon.

The video is available in two versions, the official label release edit and the bootleg director's cut which is available only on Vimeo.

The video promo is currently unavailable on ITunes Store or the official Wretch 32 website.

The video can still be viewed on YouTube.

== Live performances ==
Wretch 32 performed an acoustic version of "Forgiveness" on 17 October 2011 for SB.TV alongside featured artist Etta Bond and the LBC (Lonsdale Boys Club) – who also aided with backing vocals. The track was also performed by Wretch 32 and Delilah as part of a live session for BBC Radio 1Xtra's MistaJam on 18 October alongside tracks "Don't Be Afraid" and "Sane's The New Mad".

== Track listing ==
Digital download
No.	Title	Length
1.	"Forgiveness"	3:38
2.	"Forgiveness" (Manhattan Clique Remix)	7:52
3.	"Forgiveness" (S.P.Y. Remix)	5:44
4.	"Forgiveness" (Todd Edwards Remix)	6:26
5.	"Forgiveness" (Hatcha and Lost Remix)	6:57
6.	"Forgiveness" (STINKAHBELL Remix)	4:35

CD single
No.	Title	Length
1.	"Forgiveness" (Radio Edit)	3:38
2.	"Forgiveness" (Manhattan Clique Radio Edit)	3:46
3.	"Forgiveness" (Manhattan Clique Remix)	7:53
4.	"Forgiveness" (S.P.Y. Remix)	5:44
5.	"Forgiveness" (Todd Edwards Remix)	6:26
6.	"Forgiveness" (Todd Edwards Dub Mix)	6:15
7.	"Forgiveness" (Hatcha and Lost Remix)	6:57
8.	"Forgiveness" (Hatcha and Lost Dub Mix)	6:23
9.	"Forgiveness" (STINKAHBELL (Day) Remix)	4:35
10.	"Forgiveness" (Instrumental Edit)	3:39

== Personnel ==
- Songwriting – Jermaine Scott, Timothy McKenzie
- Production – Timothy McKenzie
- Additional vocals – Etta Bond, Labrinth (album version)

== Chart performance ==
Chart (2011)	Peak position
UK Indie (OCC)	4
UK Singles (OCC)	49
UK Hip Hop/R&B (OCC)	13

== Release history ==
Country	Release date	Format	Label
United Kingdom	11 December 2011	Digital download	Ministry of Sound; Levels
