= Men of the Mormon Tabernacle Choir =

Compilation album by Mormon Tabernacle Choir
- Released: December 26, 2010
- Length: 62:07

Men of the Mormon Tabernacle Choir is a religious compilation album released by the Mormon Tabernacle Choir.

The album first topped the Billboard Classical albums chart the week of January 29, 2011, and spent a total of seven weeks at the top of that chart in 2011.

== Track listing ==
Standard edition Disc 1
| No. | Title | Writer(s) | Arranger | Length |
|---|---|---|---|---|
| 1. | "Brethren, We Have Met to Worship" | William Moore, George Atkins | Mack Wilberg | 3:41 |
| 2. | "Brightly Beams Our Father's Mercy" | Philip Paul Bliss | Ryan Murphy | 5:21 |
| 3. | "The Morning Trumpet" | B. F. White, John Leland | Mack Wilberg | 2:34 |
| 4. | "Fight the Good Fight with All Thy Might" | John Gardner, J. S. B. Monsell | | 1:45 |
| 5. | "Evening (Aftonen)" | Hugo Alfvén, Herman Sätherberg (English version: Norman Luboff) | | 3:44 |
| 6. | "Landsighting (Landkjenning)" | Edvard Grieg, Björnstjerne Björnson (English version: Caroline Hazard) | | 5:53 |
| 7. | "Dance a Cachuca, Fandango, Bolero (Finale from The Gondoliers)" | Arthur Sullivan, W. S. Gilbert | Archibald T. Davidson | 2:36 |
| 8. | "Alleluia" | attr. to Giulio Caccini | Mack Wilberg | 6:06 |
| 9. | ""Pilgrim's Chorus" (from Tannhäuser)" | Richard Wagner (English version: Natalia Macferrin) | | 3:50 |
| 10. | ""Lullabye (Goodnight, My Angel)"" | Billy Joel | Ryan Murphy | 3:52 |
| 11. | "Hush, Little Baby" | American Lullaby (Additional Text: David Warner) | Mack Wilberg | 4:38 |
| 12. | "You Raise Me Up" | Rolf Løvland and Brendan Graham | Nathan Hofheins | 4:37 |
| 13. | "Beautiful Savior" | Silesian Folk Melody | Mack Wilberg | 3:59 |
| 14. | "There Is a Balm in Gilead" | African-American Spiritual | Mack Wilberg | 4:41 |
| 15. | "He's Got the Whole World in His Hands" | African-American Spiritual | Mack Wilberg | 4:50 |

== Charts ==
| Chart (2010) | Peak position |
|---|---|
| Billboard Classical | 1 |
