= Unorthodox (Wretch 32 song) =

Single by Wretch 32 featuring Example

from the album Black and White and Playing in the Shadows
- Released: 17 April 2011
- Recorded: 2010
- Genre: British hip hop
- Length: 3:05
- Label: Ministry of Sound
- Songwriter(s): Jermaine Scott; Elliot Gleave; Darren Lewis; Iyiola Babalola; Ian Brown; John Squire
- Producer(s): Future Cut; Shell Shock

Wretch 32 singles chronology
"Traktor" (2011)	"Unorthodox" (2011)	"Don't Go" (2011)

Example singles chronology
"Game Over" (2011)	"Unorthodox" (2011)	"Changed the Way You Kiss Me" (2011)

"Unorthodox" is a song by Tottenham-born rapper Wretch 32 featuring vocals from British recording artist Example. It was released on 17 April 2011 as the second single from his second studio album Black and White. A 12" vinyl was released the following day. The song samples Run D.M.C.'s "What's It All About" and Manchester band The Stone Roses' 1989 hit "Fools Gold" which appears on the US version of The Stone Roses and later on Turns into Stone. The track was produced and co-written by British production team Future Cut. The song also features on the album Now 79.

"Unorthodox" was selected as the Weekend Anthem of BBC Radio 1 by Jo Whiley for 26–27 March 2011. It also features on the soundtrack of FIFA Street.

== Critical reception ==
Lewis Corner of Digital Spy gave the song a positive review stating:

"I got a good vibe/ I ain't trying to be bait with my hook lines," Wretch swaggers with rapper-turned-singer Example over thrumming beats and funk-infused guitars that sample the Stone Roses' 1989 hit 'Fools Gold' – proving there is still a place for a bit string plucking while maintaining a musical relevance in today's chart. "We don't follow no crowd, they follow us," they claim on the bouncy, summery and catchy-as-cholera chorus. Like with any new and exciting fad, let's hope it's in their droves..

== Chart performance ==
"Unorthodox" first charted on 22 April 2011 on the Irish Singles Chart at number 37 and then peaking 32, beating the peak of previous single "Traktor", which reached number 45 in January 2011. On 24 April 2011, the single debuted at number 2 on the UK Singles Chart for the week ending 30 April 2011, marking Wretch 32's highest-charting single to date and Example's second highest-charting single to date; with the latter's "Changed the Way You Kiss Me" peaking at number 1. The following week the single fell five places to number 7; spending but another week in the top 10 before falling to number 16. "Unorthodox" then gradually fell down the chart, spending a total of six weeks in the top 40 before dropping down to number 43. The single also debuted at number-one on both the R&B releases chart and the independent releases chart, knocking off Jennifer Lopez's "On the Floor" and Adele's "Someone Like You" respectively.

== Music video ==
A music video to accompany the release of the single "Unorthodox" was first released on YouTube on 1 March 2011, directed by Ben Newman. The video lasts 3 minutes and 23 seconds long. The video begins with faded dictionary definition of the words 'Orthodox' and 'Unorthodox', the latter of which is defined as "breaking the convention or tradition". The song then begins to play with Wretch 32 and Example rapping besides one another when walking around the notorious Broadwater Farm estate. The lyrics talk of people not adhering to the norm and as such the video features a range of unorthodox characters; including a young child with speakers in a shopping trolley, women with piercings, a woman shaving her head and a tattoo artist. The video features cameos from rappers Chipmunk, Scorcher, singer Yasmin & Akai Osei

== Track listing ==
Digital download
No.	Title	Length
1.	"Unorthodox" (Radio Edit)	3:05
2.	"Unorthodox" (Distance Remix)	4:26
3.	"Unorthodox" (BAR9 Remix)	4:35
4.	"Unorthodox" (Logistics Remix)	4:39
5.	"Unorthodox" (Moto Blanco Edit)	3:38

CD single
No.	Title	Length
1.	"Unorthodox" (Radio Edit)	3:05
2.	"Unorthodox" (Moto Blanco Club Mix)	6:38
3.	"Unorthodox" (Logistics Remix)	4:40
4.	"Unorthodox" (Distance Remix)	4:27
5.	"Unorthodox" (BAR9 Remix)	4:35
6.	"Unorthodox" (Moto Blanco Edit)	3:38
7.	"Unorthodox" (Instrumental Edit)	3:06

== Charts ==
=== Weekly charts ===
Chart (2011)	Peak position
Ireland (IRMA)	32
Scotland (OCC)	3
UK Indie (OCC)	1
UK Hip Hop/R&B (OCC)	1
UK Singles (OCC)	2

=== Year-end charts ===
Chart (2011)	position
UK Singles (OCC)	95

== Certifications ==
Region	Certification	Certified units/sales
United Kingdom (BPI)	Gold	400,000^{‡}
^{‡} Sales+streaming figures based on certification alone.

== Release history ==
Region	Date	Format
United Kingdom	17 April 2011	Digital download
United Kingdom	18 April 2011	Vinyl
