= Nobody Like You =

Nobody Like You may refer to:

- "Nobody Like You", by Itzy from the 2020 EP It'z Me
- "Nobody Like You", by Kaskade from the 2017 EP Redux EP 002
- "Nobody Like You", by Kim Jae-joong from the 2022 album Born Gene
- "Nobody Like You", by Limp Bizkit featuring Jonathan Davis and Scott Weiland, from the 1999 album Significant Other
- "Nobody Like You", by Little Mix from the 2016 album Glory Days
- "Nobody Like You", by Louis the Child featuring Vera Blue, from the 2020 album Here for Now

== See also ==
- Ain't Nobody Like You (disambiguation)
- "Nobody Likes You", a section in the 2004 Green Day song "Homecoming"
- "Nobody Like U", a 2022 song by fictional boy band 4*Town from Disney/Pixar's Turning Red
