= 6 Words =

Single by Wretch 32

from the album Growing Over Life
- Released: 16 November 2014
- Genre: Drum and bass
- Length: 3:33
- Label: Ministry of Sound; Levels
- Songwriters: Jermaine Scott; Varren Wade
- Producers: Mikey Muzik; Mo-Samuels; Wilkinson (add.)

Wretch 32 singles chronology
"Doing OK" (2013)	"6 Words" (2014)	"Alright with Me" (2015)

"6 Words" is a song by English rapper Wretch 32. It was released on 16 November 2014 as the lead single from his third studio album Growing Over Life. The song was produced by Mikey Muzik and Mo-Samuels from the Sons of Sonix Music Group, with additional production and engineering by Wilkinson. It peaked at number 8 on the UK Singles Chart, making it Wretch's fifth top ten single in the UK.

== Musical influences and styles ==
Wretch received mixed feedback following the release of the song, due to the fact that he wasn't rapping on it. He told MistaJam "I'm still adamant that it's gliding, I'm gliding in key". Speaking to Complex UK about this, he said:

"Listening to Beenie Man, Bounty Killer and all those guys when I was growing up, I heard them guys rapping and singing and they can't really sing, but it still sounds good because it's in-tune. I wouldn't class them as singers. like I would Whitney Houston or someone, but they have the ability to do that because it's in their range and I knew it was in my ability because I can sing along with them, but I can't sing. I always had in my head, 'I'm gonna make a record where there are no rap verses.' And that's what '6 Words' is. It's not like everyday rap and I'd say that Gary Barlow and Chris Martin inspired it because, in the studio, all I was thinking was that I needed to write a better song than what they would write."

== Music video ==
A music video to accompany the release of "6 Words" was first released onto YouTube on 14 October 2014. The video features imagery such as loudspeakers placed in a field.

== Track listing ==
Digital download – single
No.	Title	Length
1.	"6 Words"	3:33

Digital download – EP
No.	Title	Length
1.	"6 Words" (Friction Remix)	4:29
2.	"6 Words" (Mike Mago Remix)	4:36
3.	"6 Words" (Nora En Pure Remix)	5:53
4.	"6 Words" (Nathan C Remix)	5:42
5.	"6 Words" (Fabian Baroud Remix)	5:31

== Personnel ==
- Vocals - Wretch 32
- Backing vocals - Teni Tinks, Vicky Tola, Ben Williams
- Guitar - Andy Shaw
- Songwriting - Jermaine Scott, Varren Wade
- Production - Mikey Muzik, Mo-Samuels
- Mixing, additional production - Wilkinson

== Charts ==
=== Weekly charts ===
Chart (2014–15)	Peak position
Australia (ARIA)	25
Scottish Singles Sales (Official Charts)	12
UK Singles (Official Charts)	8
UK Indie (Official Charts)	1

=== Certifications ===
Region	Certification	Certified units/sales
United Kingdom (BPI)	Gold	400,000^{‡}
^{‡} Sales+streaming figures based on certification alone.

== Release history ==
Country	Release date	Format	Label
United Kingdom	16 November 2014	Digital download, CD single	Ministry of Sound / Levels
