= Blackout (Wretch 32 song) =

Single by Wretch 32 featuring Shakka
- Released: 12 May 2013
- Recorded: 2012–13
- Genre: British hip hop; world music
- Length: 3:46
- Label: Ministry of Sound; Levels
- Songwriters: Jermaine Scott; Shakka Philip; Knox Brown
- Producer: Knox Brown

Wretch 32 singles chronology
"Off With Their Heads" (2012)	"Blackout" (2013)	"Doing OK" (2013)

Shakka singles chronology
"Sooner or Later" (2012)	"Blackout" (2013)	"Spin" (2013)

"Blackout" is a song by British rapper Wretch 32, featuring vocals from British recording artist Shakka. It was released on 12 May 2013. The song was produced by Knox Brown. The song was written by Jermaine Scott, Shakka, and Knox Brown.

== Music video ==
A music video to accompany the release of "Blackout" was first released onto YouTube on 28 March 2013 at a total length of three minutes and forty-nine seconds.

== Track listing ==
Digital download
No.	Title	Length
1.	"Blackout" (Radio Edit)	3:46
2.	"Blackout"	3:46
3.	"Blackout" (T Williams Remix)	5:06
4.	"Blackout" (Bobby Tank Remix)	5:21
5.	"Blackout" (Petite Noir Remix)	3:21

CD single
No.	Title	Length
1.	"Blackout"	3:46
2.	"Blackout" (Radio Edit)	3:46
3.	"Blackout" (Instrumental Edit)	3:46
4.	"Blackout" (T Williams Remix)	5:06
5.	"Blackout" (Bill and Will Remix)	5:13
6.	"Blackout" (Petite Noir Remix)	3:21
7.	"Blackout" (Amtrac Remix)	5:54

CD single (alternate)
No.	Title	Length
1.	"Blackout"	3:46
2.	"Blackout" (Amtrac Remix)	5:54
3.	"Blackout" (Bill and Will Remix)	5:13
4.	"Blackout" (Bobby Tank Remix)	5:21
5.	"Blackout" (Petite Noir Remix)	3:21
6.	"Blackout" (T Williams Remix)	5:06

== Personnel ==
- Vocals - Wretch 32, Shakka
- Songwriting - Jermaine Scott, Shakka Philip, Knox Brown
- Production - Knox Brown

== Chart performance ==
=== Weekly charts ===
Chart (2013)	Peak position
Ireland (IRMA)	58
Scotland Singles (OCC)	10
UK Dance (OCC)	3
UK Indie (OCC)	3
UK Singles (OCC)	6

=== Year-end charts ===
Chart (2013)	Position
UK Singles (Official Charts Company)	165

== Release history ==
Country	Release date	Format	Label
United Kingdom	12 May 2013	Digital download; CD single	Ministry of Sound / Levels
