= Black and White (Wretch 32 album) =

Studio album by Wretch 32
- Released: 21 August 2011
- Recorded: February 2010 – May 2011
- Genre: British hip hop; R&B; grime
- Length: 58:24
- Label: Ministry of Sound
- Producer: Future Cut; Rachel Moulden; Paul Heard; Nutty P; TMS; Shell Shock; Labrinth; iSHi

Wretch 32 chronology
Wretchrospective (2008)	Black and White (2011)	Growing Over Life (2016)

Singles from Black and White
- 1. "Traktor" Released: 16 January 2011; 2. "Unorthodox" Released: 17 April 2011; 3. "Don't Go" Released: 14 August 2011; 4. "Forgiveness" Released: 11 December 2011; 5. "Hush Little Baby" Released: 27 May 2012

Professional ratings
Review scores
Source	Rating
AllMusic	4/5 stars
BBC Music	(favourable)
The Guardian	3/5 stars
The Independent	4/5 stars
NME	5/10 stars

Black and White is the second studio album and major label debut by British hip hop recording artist Wretch 32. The album was released in the United Kingdom on 21 August 2011 through Ministry of Sound, debuting at number four on the UK Albums Chart with first week sales of nearly 25,000 copies. The album follows his independent debut album, Wretchrospective, which was released three years earlier, in 2008. The album spawned six singles over the course of eighteen months, all of which peaked inside the UK top 50, including three top five singles, and a number one single, "Don't Go". The album includes collaborations with Ed Sheeran, Daley, Etta Bond and Example.

== Singles ==
- "Traktor" was released as the first single released from the album on 16 January 2011. It peaked at number five on the UK Singles Chart, becoming the third most successful single from the album. The track features vocals from L Marshall and was produced by Yogi.
- "Unorthodox" was released as the second single from the album on 17 April 2011. It peaked at number two on the UK Singles Chart, becoming the second most successful single from the album. The track features vocals from Example.
- "Don't Go" was released as the third single from the album on 14 August 2011. It peaked at number one on the UK Singles Chart, becoming the album's most successful single. The track features vocals from upcoming musician and songwriter Josh Kumra.
- "Forgiveness" was released as the fourth single from the album on 11 December 2011. It peaked at number 39 on the UK Singles Chart, becoming the least successful single from the album. The track features vocals from Etta Bond, and was produced by Labrinth.
- "Long Way Home" was released as a single from the album on 14 February 2012, in promotion of the track's featuring artist, Daley. It was ineligible to chart on the UK Singles Chart, and was simply released in the form of a promotional music video.
- "Hush Little Baby" was released as the fifth and final single from the album on 27 May 2012. It peaked at number 35 on the UK Singles Chart, due to little promotion. The track features vocals from singer-songwriter Ed Sheeran.

== Track listing ==
No.	Title	Writer(s)	Producer(s)	Length
1.	"Black and White"	Jermaine Scott	Parallel	4:01
2.	"Never Be Me" (featuring Angel)	Scott; Sirach Charles	The J.F.L.O.W.S; Wizzy Wow	3:32
3.	"Traktor" (featuring L Marshall)	Scott; Yogi Tulsiani; Thomas Christopher Temilaye Rosiki-Griffith	Yogi	3:47
4.	"Please Don't Let Me Go"	Scott	The J.F.L.O.W.S	3:45
5.	"Unorthodox" (featuring Example)	Scott; Iyiola Babalola; Darren Lewis; Example	Future Cut	3:23
6.	"I'm Not the Man" (featuring Chipmunk and Angel)	Scott; Charles; Jahmaal Noel Fyffe	Parallel	4:24
7.	"Anniversary (Fall in Love)" (featuring Alex Mills)	Scott; Alexandra Kollantai Mills	Nutty P	3:44
8.	"Sane's the New Mad"	Scott; Eshraque Mughal; Charlie Bernardo	iSHi	3:28
9.	"Forgiveness" (featuring Etta Bond)	Scott; Timothy McKenzie	Labrinth	5:06
10.	"Long Way Home" (featuring Daley)	Scott; Babalola; Lewis; Gareth Daley	Future Cut	3:56
11.	"Let Yourself Go"	Scott	The J.F.L.O.W.S; Wizzy Wow	3:53
12.	"Don't Be Afraid" (featuring Delilah)	Scott; Mughal; Paloma Ayana Stoecker	iSHi	3:28
13.	"Hush Little Baby" (featuring Ed Sheeran)	Scott; Ed Sheeran; Iain James; Tom Barnes; Pete Kelleher; Ben Kohn	TMS	3:56
14.	"Don't Go" (featuring Josh Kumra)	Scott; Rachel Moulden; Josh Kumra	Paul Heard; Rachel 'Maiday' Moulden	3:58

Deluxe edition bonus disc
No.	Title	Writer(s)	Producer(s)	Length
1.	"Breathe (Sha La La)"	Scott	Noisia	3:53
2.	"Air"	Scott; Owen Cutts	Semothy Jones; Simon Neale	3:42
3.	"Traktor" (acoustic version) (featuring L Marshall)	Scott; Tulsiani; Rosiki-Griffith	Yogi	3:40
4.	"Anniversary" (acoustic version) (featuring Alex Mills)	Scott; Mills	Nutty P	3:40
5.	"Don't Go" (acoustic version) (featuring Josh Kumra)	Scott; Moulden; Kumra	Paul Heard; Maiday	4:00
6.	"Unorthodox" (Royal T remix) (featuring Example)	Scott; Gleave; Babalola; Lewis	Future Cut (additional production by Mark Taylor)	4:39
7.	"Traktor" (Friction remix) (featuring L Marshall)	Scott; Tulsiani; Rosiki-Griffith	Yogi (additional production by Ed Keeley)	4:38
8.	"Don't Go" (MJ Cole remix) (featuring Josh Kumra)	Scott; Moulden; Kumra	Paul Heard; Maiday (additional production by Matthew James Coleman)	5:28

Album sampler
No.	Title	Writer(s)	Producer(s)	Length
1.	"Unorthodox" (featuring Example)	Scott; Gleave; Babalola; Lewis	Future Cut	3:23
2.	"Air" (demo version)	Scott; Owen Cutts	Semothy Jones; Dave Spoon	3:42
3.	"Anniversary" (featuring Alex Mills)	Scott; Mills	Nutty P	3:44
4.	"Traktor" (featuring L Marshall)	Scott; Tulsiani; Rosiki-Griffith	Yogi	3:47
5.	"Long Way Home" (demo version) (featuring Daley)	Scott; Gareth Daley; Babalola; Lewis	Future Cut	3:56

Notes

- "Forgiveness" features uncredited vocals from Labrinth.

Sample credits

- "Black and White" samples "Different Strokes" by Syl Johnson
- "Unorthodox" samples "Fools Gold" by The Stone Roses.
- "Hush Little Baby" adapts lyrics from the lullaby "Hush, Little Baby".

== Charts ==
Chart	Peak position
Irish Albums Chart	86
Irish Indie Chart	7
Scottish Albums Chart	7
UK Albums Chart	4
UK R&B Chart	1

== Certifications ==
Certifications for Black and White
Region	Certification	Certified units/sales
United Kingdom (BPI)	Gold	100,000^{*}
^{*} Sales figures based on certification alone.

== Release history ==
Region	Date	Format	Label
Ireland	21 August 2011	CD; 2CD; digital download	Ministry of Sound
United Kingdom	21 August 2011	CD; 2CD; digital download	Ministry of Sound
