= Concrete Jungle (Scorcher album) =

Studio album by Scorcher
- Released: 23 November 2009
- Genre: Grime

Concrete Jungle is a 2009 debut album by Scorcher released independently. The album is seen as a critical success in electronic music. The albums has spawned two singles, 'I Know' and 'Lipsin' Ting', neither of which charted. The albums has been widely anticipated by many in the grime scene, but disappointed many in the scene. It features collaborations with the likes of Wiley, J2K, and Wretch 32. The album was inspired by a short freestyle by Scorcher. The 3rd single from the album is 'Dark Knight'.

== Track listing ==
1. "Dark Knight"
2. "Space Invader" (ft. Wizzy Wow)
3. "Good Morning" (ft. Wretch 32 and Kay Young) [Produced by Vex Music]
4. "Standing On The Chairs"
5. "I Know" (ft. Wiley and J2K)
6. "London Boy"
7. "Trend Setters" (ft. G-Frsh, Wretch 32 and Mercston)
8. "Gangsta"
9. "Revenge" (ft. The J.F.L.O.W.S)
10. "We Don't Care" (ft. Terminator)
11. "Interlude" (Performed by Grand Jones)
12. "She Don't Know" (ft. Darren B)
13. "Turbulence"
14. "Grownard"
15. "Lights On" (ft. Wretch 32 and Mercston)
16. "This Is Me"
17. "Getaway"
18. "Pay-Per-View (Bonus)"
19. "Lipsin' Ting(Bonus)"
