= FR32 =

Studio album by Wretch 32
- Released: 13 October 2017
- Length: 43:52
- Label: Polydor

Wretch 32 chronology
Growing Over Life (2016)	FR32 (2017)	Upon Reflection (2019)

Professional ratings
Aggregate scores
Source	Rating
Metacritic	61/100
Review scores
Source	Rating
Clash	8/10
The Guardian	2/5 stars
The Independent	3/5 stars

FR32 is the fourth studio album by British musician Wretch 32. It was released on 13 October 2017 through Polydor Records. It features Kojo Funds, Avelino whom Wretch previously collaborated on a mixtape titled Young Fire, Old Flame released in 2015. The album's lead single "Tell Me" features Kojo Funds and Jahlani.

== Track listing ==
No.	Title	Length
1.	"Dpmo"	3:45
2.	"Gracious" (featuring Loick Essien)	3:48
3.	"Tell Me" (featuring Kojo Funds and Jahlani)	3:43
4.	"His & Hers (Perspectives)"	4:10
5.	"Happy" (featuring J. Warner)	3:39
6.	"Good Morning" (featuring Rukhsana Merrise)	3:28
7.	"Power" (featuring J. Warner)	3:55
8.	"Break-Fast" (featuring Yxng Bane and Avelino)	3:55
9.	"Colour Purple" (featuring Kojey Radical)	2:58
10.	"Time"	3:56
11.	"Thugs Prayer"	3:53
12.	"Whistle" (featuring Donae'o and Kojo Funds)	2:46

== Charts ==
Chart (2017)	Peak position
UK Albums (OCC)	12
