= Doing OK =

Single by Wretch 32 featuring Jacob Banks
- Released: 25 August 2013
- Recorded: 2012–13
- Genre: British hip hop; world; soul
- Length: 3:15 (radio edit); 3:58 (album version)
- Label: Ministry of Sound; Levels
- Songwriters: Jermaine Scott; Jacob Banks; Knox Brown
- Producer: Knox Brown

Wretch 32 singles chronology
"Blackout" (2013)	"Doing OK" (2013)	"6 Words" (2014)

Jacob Banks singles chronology
"Worthy" (2013)	"Doing OK" (2013)	"Alive" (2013)

"Doing OK" is a song by British rapper Wretch 32, featuring vocals from British singer Jacob Banks. It was released on 25 August 2013. The song was produced by Knox Brown. It peaked at number 60 on the UK Singles Chart, despite managing to reach number 8 in the UK Indie Chart. Speaking in 2015 about the song's chart performance, Wretch said "this one didn't do OK, ironically."

== Music video ==
A music video to accompany the release of "Doing OK" was first released onto YouTube on 29 July 2013 at a total length of three minutes and twenty-four seconds.

== Track listing ==
Digital download
No.	Title	Length
1.	"Doing OK" (Radio Edit)	3:15
2.	"Doing OK" (DEVolution Remix)	5:48
3.	"Doing OK" (Mike Mago Remix)	4:27
4.	"Doing OK" (Cahill Remix)	6:06
5.	"Doing OK"	3:58

CD single
No.	Title	Length
1.	"Doing OK" (Radio Edit)	3:15
2.	"Doing OK" (Cahill Remix)	6:06
3.	"Doing OK" (DEVolution Remix)	5:48
4.	"Doing OK" (Mike Mago Remix)	4:27
5.	"Doing OK" (Star.One Remix)	3:43
6.	"Doing OK" (Instrumental Edit)	3:15

== Personnel ==
- Vocals – Wretch 32, Jacob Banks
- Songwriting – Jermaine Scott, Jacob Banks, Knox Brown
- Production – Knox Brown

== Charts ==
Chart (2013)	Peak position
UK Hip Hop/R&B (Official Charts)	12
UK Indie (Official Charts)	8
UK Singles (Official Charts)	60

== Release history ==
Country	Release date	Format	Label
United Kingdom	25 August 2013	Digital download, CD single	Ministry of Sound / Levels
