= Don't Go (Wretch 32 song) =

Single by Wretch 32 featuring Josh Kumra

from the album Black and White
- Released: 14 August 2011
- Recorded: 2010
- Genre: Hip hop; R&B
- Length: 3:58
- Label: Ministry of Sound
- Songwriters: Jermaine Scott; Rachel Moulden; Josh Kumra
- Producers: Maiday; Paul Heard

Wretch 32 singles chronology
"Unorthodox" (2011)	"Don't Go" (2011)	"Hangover" (2011)

Josh Kumra singles chronology
"Don't Go" (2011)	"Helicopters & Planes" (2012)

"Don't Go" is a single from British rapper Wretch 32 that appears on his début album Black and White and features vocals from English singer Josh Kumra. The single was released in the United Kingdom as a digital download on 14 August 2011.

The single peaked at number one on the UK Singles Chart upon entry in August 2011, becoming Wretch 32's first chart topping song.

== Background ==
The song, originally a demo by Maiday called "The Only Thing I Need", was given to Wretch and the hook and first verse were re-created by Kumra. In an interview with Digital Spy he was asked if he was pleased with the response to his new single "Don't Go", he said: "It's been good, I think. This third single isn't the easiest or most obvious choice, but I think it's starting to connect with people, which is all I want to do really. This type of sound is what I was known for making on my old CDs and mixtapes. I like heartfelt music, but I wanted to initially come out with something for the clubs and festivals."

== Music video ==
A music video to accompany the release of "Don't Go" was released onto YouTube on 11 July 2011, directed by Ben Newman with a total length of four minutes and one second. It was filmed on the banks of the River Thames near London City Airport.

== Critical reception ==
Robert Copsey of Digital Spy gave the song a positive review stating:

"Love drunk you and I would die sober/ I'm in this for forever and a day," he insists to his missus over minimal, plodding beats. While his bunny boiler tendencies might not be to everyone's taste, it's encouraging to hear there's more to him than the usual braggathons spouted by today's rap pack. "So don't go, don't leave/ Please stay with me/ You're the only thing I need to get by," guest vocalist Josh Kumra croons on the lighter-waving chorus; the result is not as instant as his previous offerings, but easily his most infectious yet.

== Track listing ==
Digital download and CD single
No.	Title	Length
1.	"Don't Go" (radio edit)	3:58
2.	"Don't Go" (DJ Fresh remix)	4:10
3.	"Don't Go" (Manhattan Clique remix)	6:33
4.	"Don't Go" (Sezer Uysal Goes remix)	6:37
5.	"Don't Go" (Thunderskank Go Harder remix)	3:59
6.	"Don't Go" (Submerse remix)	4:03
7.	"Don't Go" (Manhattan Clique edit)	3:25
8.	"Don't Go" (DJ Fresh edit)	2:43

== Charts ==
=== Weekly charts ===
Chart (2011)	Peak position
Ireland (IRMA)	39
Scottish Singles Sales (Official Charts)	2
UK Indie (Official Charts)	1
UK Hip Hop/R&B (Official Charts)	1
UK Singles (Official Charts)	1

=== Year-end charts ===
Chart (2011)	position
UK Singles (Official Charts Company)	73

== Certifications ==
Region	Certification	Certified units/sales
United Kingdom (BPI)	Platinum	600,000^{‡}
^{‡} Sales+streaming figures based on certification alone.

== Release history ==
Country	Release date	Format	Label
United Kingdom	14 August 2011	Digital download	Ministry of Sound
