= Growing Over Life =

Studio album by Wretch 32
- Released: 2 September 2016
- Recorded: 2014–2015
- Genre: British hip hop; R&B; grime
- Label: Polydor

Wretch 32 chronology
Black and White (2011)	Growing Over Life (2016)	FR32 (2017)

Singles from Growing Over Life
- 1. "6 Words" Released: 16 November 2014; 2. "Antwi" Released: 19 May 2016; 3. "Liberation" Released: 5 July 2016; 4. "All a Dream" Released: 2016; 5. "I.O.U" Released: 2016; 6. "Open Conversation & Mark Duggan" Released: 18 November 2016

Growing Over Life is the third studio album by British hip hop recording artist Wretch 32. It was released on 2 September 2016 through Polydor Records. The album peaked at number 5 on the UK Albums Chart. The album includes the singles "6 Words", "Antwi", "Liberation", "All a Dream", "I.O.U" and "Open Conversation & Mark Duggan".

== Singles ==
"6 Words" was released as the lead single from the album on 16 November 2014. The song peaked at number 8 on the UK Singles Chart. The song also peaked at number 25 on the Australian Singles Chart. "Antwi" was released as the second single from the album on 19 May 2016. "Liberation" was released as the third single from the album on 5 July 2016. "All a Dream" was released as the fourth single from the album. "I.O.U" was released as the fifth single from the album. "Open Conversation & Mark Duggan" was released as the sixth single from the album on 18 November 2016. It was named after Duggan, shot dead by the Metropolitan Police force in 2011.

== Track listing ==
No.	Title	Length
1.	"Anti"	3:51
2.	"Pressure"	4:22
3.	"Take Me as I Am" (featuring Phoenix Thomas and Kranium)	5:38
4.	"All a Dream" (featuring Knox Brown)	4:29
5.	"Dreams" (featuring Pantha!)	4:40
6.	"6 Words"	3:36
7.	"Open Conversation & Mark Duggan" (featuring Avelino)	6:08
8.	"Liberation"	3:23
9.	"Cooked Food"	3:08
10.	"I.O.U." (featuring Emeli Sandé)	3:58
11.	"Something"	3:59
12.	"Church"	4:52

== Charts ==
Chart (2016)	Peak position
Scottish Albums (OCC)	43
UK Albums (OCC)	5

== Release history ==
Country	Date	Label	Format
United Kingdom	2 September 2016	Polydr	Digital download; CD
