= Traktor (song) =

Single by Wretch 32 featuring L Marshall

from the album Black and White
- Released: 16 January 2011
- Recorded: 2010
- Genre: British hip hop; R&B
- Length: 3:38
- Label: Ministry of Sound
- Songwriter(s): Jermaine Scott; Yogi Tulsiani; Thomas Christopher Temilaye Rosiki-Griffith
- Producer(s): Yogi

Wretch 32 singles chronology
"Traktor" (2011)	"Unorthodox" (2011)

L singles chronology
"Traktor" (2011)	"The Wait" (2012)

"Traktor" is a song by Tottenham-born rapper Wretch 32, featuring vocals from British singer L Marshall (credited as "L" on the release). It was released as the lead single from his second studio album, Black and White, on 16 January 2011. A 12" vinyl was released the following day. On 23 January 2011, the single debuted at number 5 on the UK Singles Chart; also managing to reach number 2 on both the R&B chart and the independent releases chart. The song title refers to Traktor, the Native Instruments DJ software of the same name.

"Traktor" was selected by Reggie Yates as The Weekend Anthem on BBC Radio 1 for 18 – 19 December 2010.

== Background ==
Speaking to noted UK R&B writer Pete Lewis – assistant editor of Blues & Soul – in December 2010 Wretch stated: "'Traktor' is actually about a dad talking to his child. Like on the intro the dad is saying 'Hey, go get a job' and basically telling his son to get outta the house. Then the chorus is actually the son explaining what's going on in his life. Like he's quit school; he hasn't got a job yet; his girl's upset 'cause she's pregnant and – though his daughter's on the way – he keeps on clubbing and raving... But yet through it all he knows that he rides the beat like a TRACTOR – that he's a great RAPPER! You know, though everything is so wild in his life he literally does know that he has got a talent and he wants to stick with it... So yeah, it's basically all about having a gift and taking a risk with the music and BELIEVING in it. Which is pretty much how it is for ME!".

== Critical reception ==
Nick Levine of Digital Spy gave the song a positive review stating: "Though he sounds like a mere number from the Dickensian workhouse, there's nothing anonymous about this debut single."

== Chart performance ==
"Traktor" debuted on the UK Singles Chart on 23 January 2011 at number 5; marking the week's third highest new entry behind Diddy-Dirty Money and Adele. The following week, the single fell two places to number 7; falling out of the top ten to number 12 on 6 February. The single spent a total of six weeks within the top 40, falling to number 44 on its seventh week on 6 March. The single also debuted at number 2 on the R&B singles chart behind Diddy-Dirty Money and Skylar Grey's "Coming Home" and at number two on the independent releases chart behind Adele's "Rolling in the Deep". The single also debuted in Ireland and Scotland at number 45 on 28 January

== Music video ==
A music video to accompany the release of the single "Traktor" was first released on YouTube on 9 November 2010, directed by Ben Newman. The video lasts 3 minutes and 47 seconds long. The video opens with the digits '32' forming out of ice; before the song begins, in which Wretch 32, L and FKA twigs are all show in between the flashing of lights. The video takes place in an underground and empty car park and features Wretch 32 and L performing along with the song, while FKA twigs mimics the song by playing the drums; also dancing. Rapper Chipmunk makes a cameo appearance at the end of the video.

== Track listing ==
Digital download
No.	Title	Length
1.	"Traktor" (radio edit – clean)	3:38
2.	"Traktor" (Dawood & Preston remix – clean)	4:04
3.	"Traktor" (Brookes Brothers remix – clean)	4:25
4.	"Traktor" (Mike Delinquent Project remix – clean)	4:42
5.	"Traktor" (Friction remix – clean)	4:38
6.	"Traktor" (explicit edit)	3:37
7.	"Traktor" (Mike Delinquent Project Go Harder dub – clean)	4:42

CD single
No.	Title	Length
1.	"Traktor" (radio edit)	3:38
2.	"Traktor" (Dawood & Preston remix)	4:04
3.	"Traktor" (Brookes Brothers remix)	4:25
4.	"Traktor" (Mike Delinquent Project remix)	4:42
5.	"Traktor" (Friction remix)	4:38
6.	"Traktor" (explicit edit)	3:37
7.	"Traktor" (Mike Delinquent Project Go Harder dub)	4:42
8.	"Traktor" (instrumental edit)	3:38

== Charts ==
=== Weekly charts ===
Chart (2011)	Peak position
Ireland (IRMA)	45
Scotland (OCC)	8
UK Indie (OCC)	2
UK Hip Hop/R&B (OCC)	2
UK Singles (OCC)	5

=== Year-end charts ===
Chart (2011)	Position
UK Singles (OCC)	104

== Certifications ==
Region	Certification	Certified units/sales
United Kingdom (BPI)	Gold	400,000^{‡}
^{‡} Sales+streaming figures based on certification alone.

== Release history ==
Region	Date	Format
Ireland	16 January 2011	Digital download
United Kingdom	16 January 2011	Digital download
United Kingdom	17 January 2011	Vinyl
