= Hush, Little Baby =

Traditional lullaby

"Hush, Little Baby" is a traditional lullaby, thought to have been written in the Southern United States. The lyrics are from the point of view of a mother trying to appease an upset child by promising to give them a gift. Sensing the child's apprehension, the mother has planned a series of contingencies in case their gift does not work out. The simple structure allows more verses to be added ad lib. It has a Roud number of 470.

== History and traditional versions ==
As with most folk songs, the author and date of origin are unclear. The English folklorist Cecil Sharp collected and notated a version from Endicott, Franklin County, Virginia in 1918, and another version sung by a Julie Boone of Micaville, North Carolina, with a complete version of the lyrics. A version recorded on a phonograph cylinder around 1929–35 in Durham, North Carolina by James Madison Carpenter can be heard online via the Vaughan Williams Memorial Library website.

Alan Lomax recorded several varying traditional renditions of the song in the southern United States in the 1930s and 40s, including from the traditional singer Texas Gladden. All of these versions differ melodically and lyrically, to varying degrees, from the now popular version.

One of the versions recorded by Lomax was that of the influential Appalachian musician Jean Ritchie, who performed a version in 1949 that had been passed down in her family.

The Ritchie family version is identical to the versions which would later become famous. Due to the melodic and lyrical diversity of other traditional recordings and the fact that Ritchie shared a stage with and directly influenced artists who would later record the song such as The Weavers and Joan Baez, it is likely that the popular version of the song descends from Jean Ritchie's Kentucky family.

== Popular versions ==
The song has been performed and recorded by many artists including Joan Baez, Burl Ives, Regina Spektor, Nina Simone, The Weavers and the Mormon Tabernacle Choir. Additionally, the song has been adapted into pop songs such as Maurice King's "Hambone", Inez and Charlie Foxx's "Mockingbird" and Bo Diddley's eponymous song "Bo Diddley", as well as Bobby McFerrin and Yo-Yo Ma's "Hush Little Baby", Tim Minchin's "Lullaby", and Eminem's "Mockingbird".

Aretha Franklin, Carly Simon, James Taylor, Etta James, Taj Mahal and Dusty Springfield have each recorded "Mockingbird", which is an R&B variant of the song.

== Lyrics ==
The most common version of the lyrics are:

Hush, little baby, don't say a word,
Mama's gonna buy you a mockingbird.

If that mockingbird don't sing,
Mama's gonna buy you a diamond ring.

If that diamond ring turns brass,
Mama's gonna buy you a looking glass.

If that looking glass gets broke,
Mama's gonna buy you a billy-goat.

If that billy-goat don't pull,
Mama's gonna buy you a cart and bull.

If that cart and bull turn over,
Mama's gonna buy you a dog named Rover.

If that dog named Rover don't bark,
Mama's gonna buy you a horse and cart.

If that horse and cart fall down,
You'll still be the sweetest baby in town.

There are many different versions of the song. It has a simple structure consisting of a series of rhyming couplets, where a gift is given to the little baby. In the next couplet, the gift is found faulty in some way, and a new gift is presented. The song continues in this pattern as long as the singer likes; and can come up with new gifts that fit the rhyming pattern. An example of some common couplets used in the transcript of the Target commercial "Amase" (1989):

(April) Hush, Apple Dumpling, don't say a word,
Cousin's gonna buy you a Mockingbird.

And if that mockingbird don't sing,
Cousin's gonna buy you a diamond ring.
(She Cries)

And if that diamond ring turns brass...

== See also ==
- List of nursery rhymes
