= Scorcher (rapper) =

English rapper, actor and producer

- Also known as: Scorcher, Skywalker
- Born: Tayó Grant Jarrett; 5 April 1986 (age 40)
- Origin: Bush Hill Park, London, England
- Genres: British hip hop; Grime
- Occupations: Rapper; songwriter; actor
- Years active: 2004–present
- Labels: Adamantium (2006); Creating Monsters Limited (2013–2016); RU Listening Limited (2016–present)
- Formerly of: The Movement

Tayó Grant Jarrett (born 5 April 1986), better known as Scorcher, is an English grime MC, songwriter and actor from Edmonton, London. He was previously a member of the grime collective The Movement and is signed to Blue Colla Music.

== Career ==
=== 2005–08: Early career ===
Jarrett began his career in the Enfield grime crew Cold Blooded, and would regularly attend pirate radio and work his way up through the North London grime circuit. After an incident with fellow Cold Blooded member Cookie, Jarrett left the crew to concentrate on a new collective known as The Movement, alongside Wretch 32, Devlin, Mercston, and Ghetts. He served a short prison sentence in 2006 for driving offences, and while in jail his mixtape Simply the Best was released via Logan Sama's Adamantium label and was greeted with good reviews from the grime scene. He was released on 9 June 2006. While affiliated with The Movement, he and the crew participated in a highly publicised clash and exchange of diss tracks against rival grime collective Boy Better Know. Scorcher did three dubs directed at Wiley, Jammer and Frisco. Scorcher also produces beats, and Thunder Power was a release entirely his own production. He has produced beats such as "Way Down The Road", "Beef with T", "Igloo Remix", "Talk of the Ghetto" and others which were big through the year of 2006. Scorcher won an Official Mixtape Award for best producer in 2009 and was also nominated for best Grime mixtape of 2010.

=== 2009–10: Concrete Jungle and Geffen ===
Concrete Jungle is a 2009 debut album by Scorcher released independently. The album is seen as a critical success in electronic music, but a major disappointment to grime fans. The albums has spawned two singles, "I Know" and "Lipsin' Ting", neither of which charted. The albums has been widely anticipated by many in the grime scene, but disappointed many in the scene. It features collaborations with the likes of Wiley, J2K, and Wretch 32. The album was inspired by a short freestyle by Scorcher. The third single from the album is "Dark Knight". His debut single, "It's My Time", charted on the UK R&B chart at number 38. When Geffen's MD left for Sony and the bigger artist moved to other labels within Universal, Scorcher's deal was ended.

=== 2011–2014: Blue Colla and acting career ===
In 2011, Scorcher began an acting career and played the major role of Kamale, in the 2011 Channel 4 drama, Top Boy. "Making the transition from music to acting hasn't really been that hard for me, as you get used to performing its just performance in a different setting." He described his character as sinister, and an all-out bad man and is working with other rappers such as Ashley Walters, Kano and other first time actors. He has also played a part in the movie Offender which was released on 24 December 2012. After being released from Geffen Records in 2011, Scorcher was signed to independent label Blue Colla Music in 2012 and his first single of the year "It's All Love" premiered on MistaJam's 1XTRA show on 3 March 2012.

=== 2015–present: The Intent and return to music ===
Scorcher was born in England to a Jamaican father and mother from Saint Vincent and the Grenadines. In 2016, Scorcher signed to RU Listening Limited. He, Scorcher starred in the 2016 film The Intent in which he plays small-time criminal called Hoodz, who finds success in robbing stores and small businesses, and finally catches the jackpot by attacking a big drug dealer for his stash of money and drugs. He played the role of Diesel in the film Road (2017).

He returned to music in 2019 and released the singles "Gargoyle", "Could Be Worse", "9", "Sandpit" and was featured on the track "Hunnids" by Tizzy x Brandz. In October 2019 Scorcher attended the Christian Louboutin Palace Nights Collection Launch.

== Discography ==
=== Studio albums ===
- 2009: Concrete Jungle

=== Mixtapes ===
- 2006: Simply The Best
- 2006: Tempo Specialists [w/The Movement]
- 2007: Leader of the New School
- 2007: Thunder Power
- 2008: Simply The Best 2
- 2010: Jungle Book
- 2011: Audio Wave
- 2012: Simply The Best 3
- 2014: 1 of 1
- 2016: Rocket x Scorcher EP [w/Rocket]

=== Guest appearances ===
Year	Song	Artists	Album
2006	"Dealers" (also featuring Wretch 32 & Ghetts)	Devlin	Tales of the Crypt
2006	"Used To Be" (also featuring Ghetto & Mercston)	Wretch 32	Learn From My Mixtape
2006	"Why's He Tryin' It" (also featuring Skilla B)	Wretch 32	Learn From My Mixtape
2006	"Young Sammie" (also featuring Cell 22 & Heady)	Wretch 32	Learn From My Mixtape
2006	"Sorry Remix" (also featuring P. Nero, Frisco, Cell 22 & Calibar)	Wretch 32	Learn From My Mixtape
2006	"16 Bar Rally" (also featuring Rage, Esco, Jammer,& God's Gift)	Wiley	Tunnel Vision Volume 1
2006	"Sometimes I..." (also featuring Frisco)	Wiley	Tunnel Vision Volume 1
2007	"Big Love" (also featuring Big Narstie)	Bashy	Chupa Chups Mixtape
2007	"The Youts" (also featuring Bashy)	Wretch 32	Teacher's Training Day
2007	"They Can't Like Us" (also featuring Calibar)	Wretch 32	Teacher's Training Day
2007	"Gully Flossing" (also featuring Bigz, Danny B, Calibar, Heady, Frisco & Roman)	Wretch 32	Teacher's Training Day
2007	"Touching Music"	Wretch 32	Verses 3 And 2 Chapter
2007	"Testify"	Wretch 32	Verses 3 And 2 Chapter
2007	"Trying To Prevail"	Wretch 32	Verses 3 And 2 Chapter
2007	"DJ Tribute"	Wretch 32	Verses 3 And 2 Chapter
2007	"Flyboy" (also featuring Mercston & Tinie Tempah)	Wiley	Playtime is Over
2007	"U & Me" (also featuring Wretch 32)	Ghetto	Ghetto Gospel
2007	"Biker's Anthem"	Ghetto	Ghetto Gospel
2007	"Freestyle"	S.K.I.T.Z. Beats	In The Zone
2008	"Hustle Hard" (also featuring Slix)	Lightnin	Young and Gifted
2008	"5AM"	Wiley	See Clear Now
2008	"See Clear Now" (also featuring Kano)	Wiley	See Clear Now
2008	"Chinese Whispers" (also featuring Chipmunk)	Wretch 32	Wretchrospective
2008	"Swaggalicious"	Wretch 32	Wretchrospective
2008	"Be Cool (Remix)" (also featuring Chipmunk, Sway, Bashy, Wizzy Wow & Tinie Tempah)	Wretch 32	For The Fun of It
2009	"Ransom" (also featuring Wretch 32)	Bashy	Catch Me If You Can
2009	"She Likes To Remix" (England Top 10)	Wiley	The Elusive
2009	"I'm Not Alone"	Revolver	The Lost Tape
2009	"Dark Knight"	Target/Danny Weed	Aim High: The Revolution
2010	"Pass It Over (Remix)" (also featuring Ghetts, G Frsh, Wretch 32 & Little Dee)	Sincere	
2011	"Good As Gold"	Talay Riley	Sergeant Smash
2011	"The City Remix"	Ed Sheeran	+
2013	"Española Chica"	Lee Muldoon	Española Chica
2013	"Golddiggin"	John Galea	Under Attack E.P
2014	"Wherever I Fall 2.0" (also featuring Kid Bookie)	Richard Osborne	Nothing Personal
2016	"M.I.L.F. $ "	Fergie	Single
2017	"Yellow Bar "	RAII RAII	Single
2019	"Hunnids"	Tizzy x Brandz	Single
2021	"Make It Out" (also featuring Joe Black, Rimzee & Potter Payper)	Tion Wayne	Green With Envy

== Filmography ==
=== Film ===
- Offender (2012) - Essay
- The Intent (2016) - Hoodz
- Road (2017) - Diesel
- Mangrove (2020) - Linton

=== Television ===
- Top Boy (2011) - Kamale (season 1)
- You Don't Know Me (2021) - Spooks

== Personal life ==
Following the Death of Mark Duggan by Police in 2011, which resulted in the 2011 England riots, Scorcher revealed via Twitter that his grandmother was Cynthia Jarret, a 49-year-old Afro-Caribbean woman who was killed by Police on 5 October 1985 during the search of her home. Together with the death of Cherry Groce the previous week (which caused the 1985 Brixton riot, her death is credited with being one of the main causes of the Broadwater Farm riot the following day.

"[sic]25 years ago police killed my grandma in her house in Tottenham and the whole ends rioted, 25 years on and they're still keepin up fuckry. Police R here 2 uphold the law & protect us leadin by example so wen they stop upholdin the law its natural reaction 4 there 2 B lawlessness."

Scorcher is a supporter of Tottenham Hotspur F.C.
