= Wretch 32 =

British rapper (born 1985)

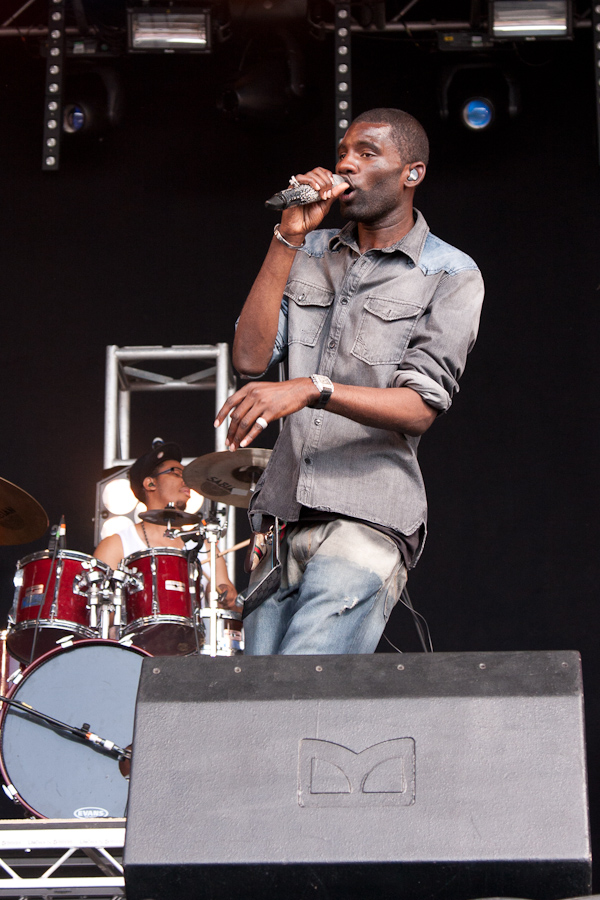
- Performing at Jersey Live in 2011.

Background information
- Born: Jermaine Sinclaire Scott; 9 March 1985 (age 41)
- Origin: Tottenham, London, England
- Genres: Hip-hop; R&B; grime
- Occupations: Rapper; singer; songwriter; creative director
- Instrument: Vocals
- Years active: 2006–present
- Labels: Ministry of Sound; Polydor; AWAL
- Website: wretch32.com

Jermaine Sinclaire Scott (born 9 March 1985), better known by his stage name Wretch 32 ("three two"), is a British rapper, singer and songwriter from Tottenham, North London. He was a member of the grime collective Combination Chain Gang, before forming The Movement with Scorcher, Ghetts, and Mercston.

In 2011, Wretch 32 had three top-five charting songs from debut album Black and White and amassed over a million record sales, including the single "Don't Go" which peaked at number-one on the UK Singles Chart. In 2012, he was employed by both Adidas and Coca-Cola as one of the main faces of their London 2012 Olympics campaigns and on 1 July 2012, he won 'Best International Act' at the 2012 BET Awards.

== Early life ==
Born in March 1985 to a Jamaican family, Jermaine grew up alongside crews Combination Chain Gang and The Movement, the latter of which featured himself, Scorcher, Ghetts, Mercston and Devlin. Continuing his MC career in 2006, Scott under the name Wretch 32 released a series of mixtapes, including Teacher's Training Day – which featured guest appearances from Ghetts, Bashy and Scorcher.

His mother was from Jamaica, where "wretch" meant slim or skinny. She called him Wretch as a child, and the name stuck. 32 is his lucky number and he thought it would be fun to have a number as a surname, so he added 32 to the end of Wretch.

== Career ==
=== 2008–2011: Wretchrospective ===
His debut studio album, Wretchrospective was released in the United Kingdom during 2008, prior to Wretch's signing with record label Ministry of Sound. On 6 December 2010, Wretch 32 was named as one of the nominees for BBC's Sound of 2011, an annual poll which predicts artists that will progress during the upcoming year. In 2010 Wretch 32 won an Official Mixtape Award for the 'best hiphop mixtape of 2009.

=== 2011–2012: Black and White ===
On 16 January 2011, Wretch released "Traktor" as the lead single from his second studio album Black and White. through Ministry of Sound as both a digital download and a CD single. The track saw commercial success, having been selected as BBC Radio 1's Reggie Yates Weekend Anthem on 19–20 December 2010, before debuting at number five on the UK Singles Chart as the third highest entry of the week. "Unorthodox", featuring British rapper Example, was released as the second single from the album on 17 April 2011. The song, which sampled The Stone Roses' 1989 hit "Fools Gold" debuted at number two in the UK, also topping the R&B chart and independent releases chart; having been selected as Jo Whiley's Weekend Anthem on 26–27 March 2011. "Don't Go", featuring Josh Kumra, was released as the album's third single on 14 August 2011. It entered the UK Singles Chart at number one, being Wretch's most successful single to date. On 11 December 2011, "Forgiveness" featuring Etta Bond was released as the album's fourth single. It charted at number 49 on the UK Singles Chart as the album's least successful single. "Hush Little Baby", featuring Ed Sheeran, was released as the fifth and final single from Black and White on 27 May 2012, peaking at number 35 on the UK Singles Chart.

=== 2012–present: Growing Over Life ===
During April and May 2012, Wretch completed an arena tour around the UK, first supporting Example from 20 to 30 April 2012, and then starting his own second headline tour from 8—19, May 2012, supported by Jakwob and Kyra. The tours saw the debut of a new track titled "Blur", to be featured on his upcoming album Growing Over Life. The song features on the FIFA 13 soundtrack, as the full track's first appearance.

In early 2012, Wretch 32 led a national TV and advertising campaign with Adidas for the London 2012 Olympics. Wretch recorded a song alongside friend and producer Wizzy Wow that was used for the Adidas #takethestage campaign and TV advert. He featured as the main face of the TV advert and was also one of the key faces of the billboard and poster campaign across the country. On 1 July 2012, Wretch 32 won 'Best International Artist' at the BET Awards. Over the course of July he also partnered with Coca-Cola and completed a tour along the south coast of Britain, following the Olympic Torch Relay in the buildup to London 2012 and playing sets in the evening celebrations. He played a stripped version of his arena tour setlist, cutting out "Forgiveness", "Hush Little Baby", "Blur" and "Don't Be Afraid". A freestyle rap was filmed in Dorset to celebrate the event, taking a tour of the area with some parkour experts. On 15 August 2012, Wretch released his mixtape Wretchercise. It features collaborations with several artists including Chip, Scorcher, Loick Essien, Krept, Konan and Kano.

In November 2012, Wretch's debut album Wretchrospective was re-released on iTunes, with Action Man (a track from Wretchercise) as a bonus track. In late 2012 a new track titled "Pop?" received airplay on many major radio stations, and remixes from Melé, Fake Blood and Wonder have been revealed. The track was released as a promotional single on 27 January 2013 and the Melé remix features on the Ministry of Sound compilation Clubbers Guide 2013. It received mixed reviews as it samples "P's and Q's" by Kano, a fellow UK rapper.

On 4 March 2013, MistaJam on BBC Radio 1Xtra premiered "Blackout" featuring Shakka, the lead single from Wretch's upcoming third studio album Growing Over Life. The song is produced by Knox Brown, who also worked on several songs for Wretchercise. He revealed in an interview with Link Up TV that he has also been working with George the Poet and Jacob Banks, within the "Renowned" music group. The album was due to be released in August, but is now expected to be released by early 2014.

On 18 June 2013, MistaJam premiered "Doing OK" featuring Jacob Banks, the second single from the album. The song is also produced by Knox Brown. Wretch is due to complete a UK headline tour with George the Poet, Jacob Banks and Context in May 2014. He also made an appearance on Naughty Boy's debut album Hotel Cabana on the track "Pluto" alongside Emeli Sandé.

In a live Google Hangout with Jacob Banks, Wretch confirmed collaborations with Eshraque "iSHi" Mughal, Angel, Daley and Beenie Man on the album. He has since confirmed the track names "Flatline", "Rock Bottom" and "Raindrops" featuring Beenie Man. Another track titled "24 Hours" appears on the soundtrack to FIFA 14, but it ended up not appearing on the album.

The album's third single, "6 Words", premiered in September 2014, and was released in November, reaching number eight in the UK Singles Chart and therefore making it one of his most successful songs.

On 18 December 2015, he released a joint mixtape with a young emerging North London artist; Avelino. The mixtape, Young Fire, Old Flame, has been labelled an industry success. The duo's Fire In The Booth freestyle on BBC Radio 1Xtra was credited by host Charlie Sloth as being the best the show had ever had.

Growing Over Life was released on 2 September 2016. It was preceded by the singles "Antwi", "Liberation", "All a Dream", "I.O.U" and "Open Conversation & Mark Duggan", all released throughout 2016 in the run-up to the album. He released FR32 in 2017.

== Personal life ==
Scott has two children with ex-girlfriend Ashlee: Kyrayn Scott (born 2006) and Skye-Laurell Scott (born 2011). Wretch is the nephew of equal rights campaigner Stafford Scott, who has written for The Guardian, and co-founded the Broadwater Farm Defence Campaign in 1985, and is a family friend of professional boxer (13–0) Viddal Riley.

Although Wretch 32 is from Tottenham, he is an avid Arsenal fan.

In March 2019, Scott claimed he had an Airbnb booking cancelled because the host "had an issue with Coloured folk and felt uncomfortable". Airbnb later said: "We were concerned to hear about this experience and have reached out to Wretch 32 and his management to learn more. Discrimination has no place on Airbnb and goes against everything our community stands for."

== Discography ==
Studio albums

- Wretchrospective (2008)
- Black and White (2011)
- Growing Over Life (2016)
- FR32 (2017)
- Upon Reflection (2019)
- Little Big Man (2021)
- Home? (2025)

== Awards and nominations ==
| Year | Organisation | Nominated work | Award | Result |
|---|---|---|---|---|
| 2006 | BBC 1Xtra | Wretch 32 | Best Hip Hop | Won |
| 2009 | Official Mixtape Awards | Wretch 32 | Most Street Heat | Won |
| 2010 | BBC Sound of 2011 | Wretch 32 | Sound of 2011 | Nominated |
| 2010 | MTV Brand New | Wretch 32 | New for 2011 | Nominated |
| - | Urban Music Awards | Wretch 32 | Artist of the Year | Won |
| - | Urban Music Awards | Wretch 32 | Best Hip Hop Act | Won |
| - | Urban Music Awards | Wretch 32 ft. Example ‘Unorthodox’ | Best Single | Won |
| - | Urban Music Awards | Wretch 32 ft. Example ‘Unorthodox’ | Best Music Video | Won |
| - | MP3 Music Awards | Wretch 32 ft. Example ‘Unorthodox’ | The UGG Award | Won |
| - | 4 Music Video Honours | Wretch 32 ft. L Marshall ‘Traktor’ | Best Big Beats | Nominated |
| - | 4 Music Video Honours | Wretch 32 | Best Breakthrough | Nominated |
| 2012 | BET Best International Act 2012 | Wretch 32 | Best International Act | Won |
| 2012 | NXG Awards | Wretch 32 | Inspiration Act | Won |
| 2017 | MOBO Awards | Growing Over Life | Best Album | Nominated |
