= Raleigh Ritchie discography =

Discography by Ritchie

- Studio albums: 2
- EPs: 4
- Singles: 18
- Music videos: 10

The discography of hip hop recording artist Raleigh Ritchie comprises two studio albums, four EPs and eighteen singles. Signing with Columbia Records in 2013, he released his debut album in 2016.

== Albums ==
=== Studio albums ===
Title	Details	Peak positions	
Title	Details	UK	SCO
You're a Man Now, Boy	Released: 26 February 2016; Label: Columbia Records; Formats: Digital download, CD, LP	32	56
Andy	Released: 26 June 2020; Label: Alacran Records; Formats: Digital download, CD, LP	— (Note: "Andy" did not enter the UK Albums Chart, but debuted and peaked at number 14 on the UK Albums Downloads Chart, number 6 on the UK Hip Hop and R&B Albums Chart and number 24 on the UK Independent Albums Chart.)	—

== Extended plays ==
Title	Details
The Middle Child	Released: 7 June 2013; Label: Columbia Records; Formats: Digital download
Black and Blue	Released: 10 January 2014; Label: Columbia Records; Formats: Digital download
Black and Blue Point Two	Released: 14 April 2014; Label: Columbia Records; Formats: Digital download
Mind the Gap	Released: 16 December 2016; Label: Columbia Records; Formats: Digital download
Dead Ends and Diversions	Released: 26 July 2024; Label: Wanderland Entertainment; Formats: Digital download

== Singles ==
Title	Year	Peak chart positions		Certifications	Album
Title	Year	UK	BEL	Certifications	Album
"The Middle Child"	2013	—	—		The Middle Child
"Stronger Than Ever"	2014	30	28	BPI: Silver	You're a Man Now, Boy
"Birthday Girl"	2014	—	—		You're a Man Now, Boy
"Cuckoo" (feat. Little Simz)	2014	—	—		Non-album single
"The Greatest"	2015	—	—		You're a Man Now, Boy
"Never Say Die" (with Sounwave)	2015	—	—		You're a Man Now, Boy
"Bloodsport '15"	2015	160	—	BPI: Silver	You're a Man Now, Boy
"Keep it Simple" (feat. Stormzy)	2016	—	—		You're a Man Now, Boy
"Time in a Tree"	2018	—	—		Andy
"Me Myself and I"	2018	—	—		Non-album single
"Aristocrats"	2020	—	—		Andy
"Party Fear"	2020	—	—		Andy
"Squares"	2020	—	—		Andy
"I'm Not Okay But I Know I'm Going To Be"	2021	—	—		Non-album singles
"Say What You Mean"	2021	—	—		Non-album singles
"Lucky"	2021	—	—		Non-album singles
"Love Is Dumb"	2024	—	—		Dead Ends and Diversions
"Security"	2024	—	—		Dead Ends and Diversions
"I Had A Feeling"	2026	—	—		Non-album single

== Other charted songs ==
List of non-single guest appearances, with other performing artists, showing year released and album name
Title	Year	Peak chart positions	Album
Title	Year	UK	Album
"Don't Cry For Me" (Stormzy featuring Raleigh Ritchie)	2017	63	Gang Signs & Prayer

== Guest appearances ==
List of non-single guest appearances, with other performing artists, showing year released and album name
Title	Year	Other artist(s)	Album
"I Need Love"	2008	Plan B	Adulthood Soundtrack

== Soundtrack appearances ==
List of film soundtrack appearances, showing year released and album name
Title	Year	Album
"Bad Place"	2015	Just Jim Soundtrack

== Music videos ==
List of music videos, showing year released and directors
Title	Year	Director(s)	Ref.
"Stay Inside"	2013	Kieron Hawkes	
"Stronger Than Ever"	2014	Ninian Doff	
"The Greatest"	2015	Fred Rowson	
"Bloodsport '15"	2015	Shynola	
"Bloodsport '15 (Pt. 2)"	2015	Shynola	
"Never Better"	2016	Casper Kelly	
"You're a Man Now, Boy"	2016	Inari Sirola	
"StraitJacket"	2016	Raleigh Ritchie	
"Time in a Tree"	2018	Raleigh Ritchie	
"Aristocrats"	2020	Raleigh Ritchie	
"Lucky"	2024	Unknown	
