= Origo =

Origo may refer to:

- Origo (album), an album by the band Burst
- Origo (moth), a genus of moth in the family Gelechiidae
- Origo (pragmatics), a concept in pragmatics
- "Origo" (song), by Joci Pápai, representing Hungary in the Eurovision Song Contest 2017
- Origo (website), a Hungarian news website
- Iris Origo, writer
- Origo Sound, a record label
- Origo hf., an Icelandic information technology services company
- Origo (EP), an extended play by singer Natalia Nykiel
- Origo (Martin Garrix EP), an extended play by DJ Martin Garrix
- See also Origin (mathematics)
