= The Voice of Poland season 2 =

The Voice of Poland
- Season 2
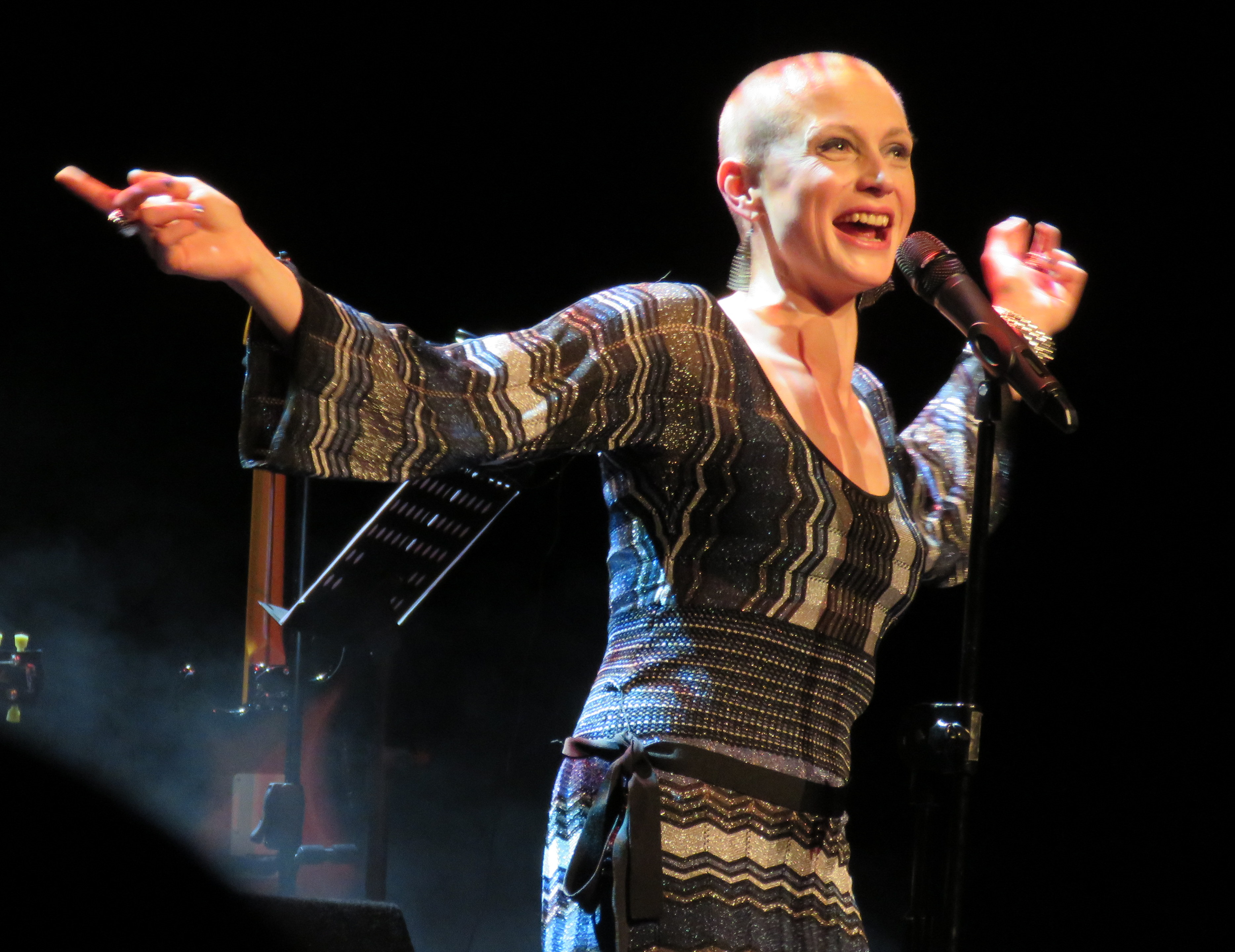
- Hosted by: Tomasz Kammel; Marika; Maciej Musiał (V Reporter); Iga Krefft (V Reporter)
- Judges: Justyna Steczkowska; Patrycja Markowska; Marek Piekarczyk; Tomson & Baron
- Winner: Natalia Sikora
- Runner-up: Dorota Osińska

Release
- Original network: TVP2
- Original release: March 2 – May 18, 2013

Season chronology
- ← Previous; Season 1 Next → Season 3

The second season of The Voice of Poland began airing 2 March 2013 on TVP 2.

For this season, during the battle round, opposing coaches have the ability to steal the singer that was sent home by the original coach. If more than one coach hits their buzzer to recruit the singer in question, it's up to the contestant to decide which coach he or she wants to work with.

== Coaches and Hosts ==
It was announced that Hubert Urbański and Magdalena Mielcarz will not be back to present the series. Tomasz Kammel and Marika, polish reggae singer, will present the show instead. Maciej Musiał will replace Mateusz Szymkowiak as a V Reporter. The new season will feature a new judging panel. The new judges are Justyna Steczkowska, Patrycja Markowska, Marek Piekarczyk and Tomson & Baron from Afromental. On April 6, 2013, it was reported that Iga Krefft will join Musiał as a V Reporter.

Coaches and Hosts gallery

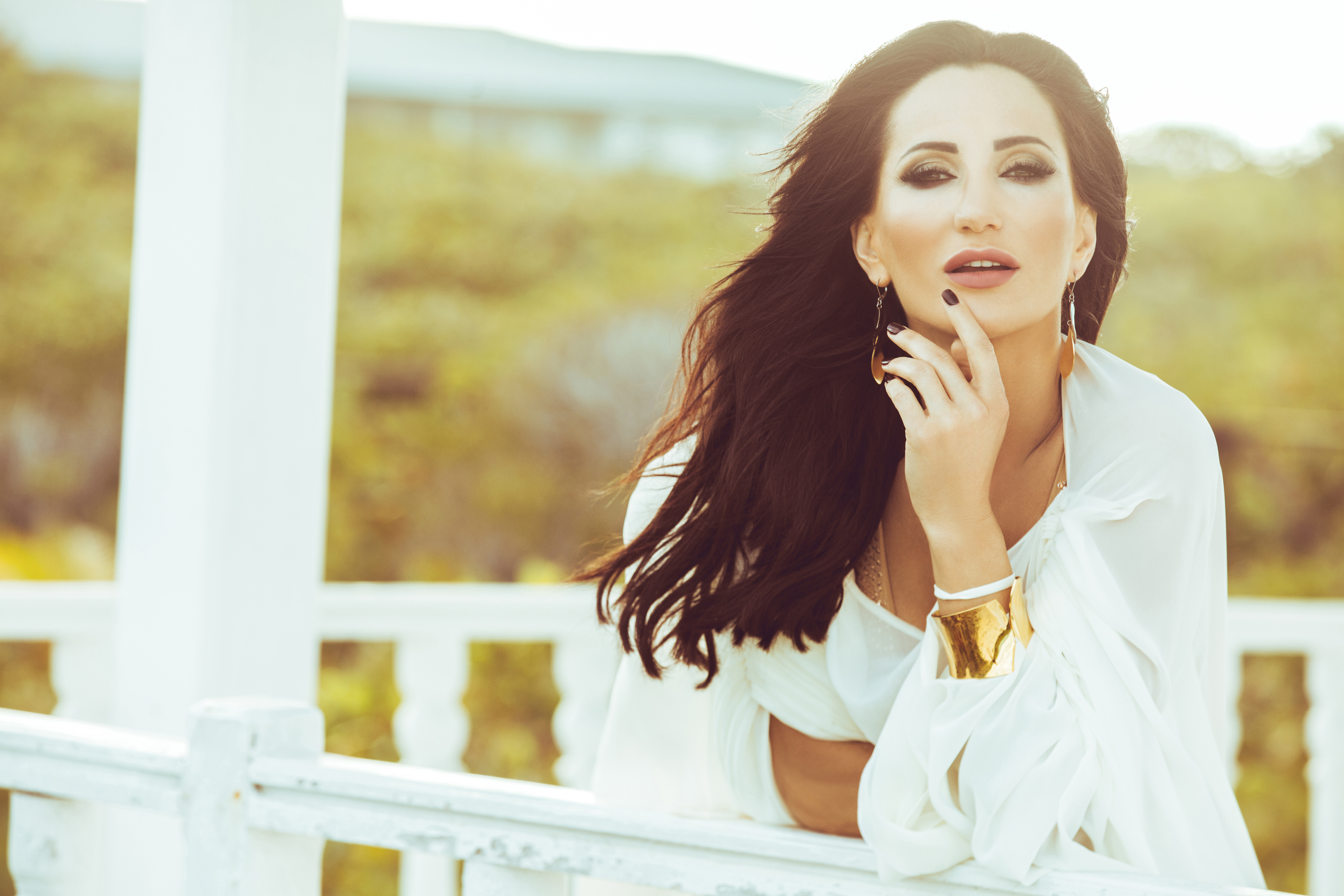
Justyna Steczkowska

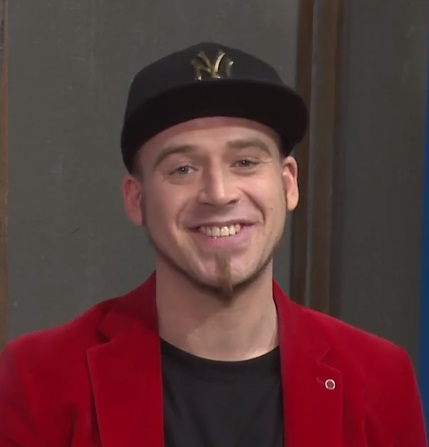
Tomasz Lach (duo)

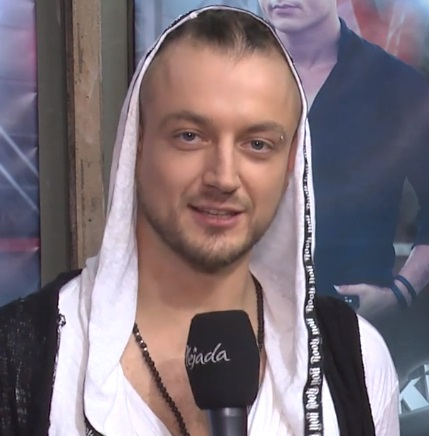
Aleksandr Milwiw-Baron (duo)

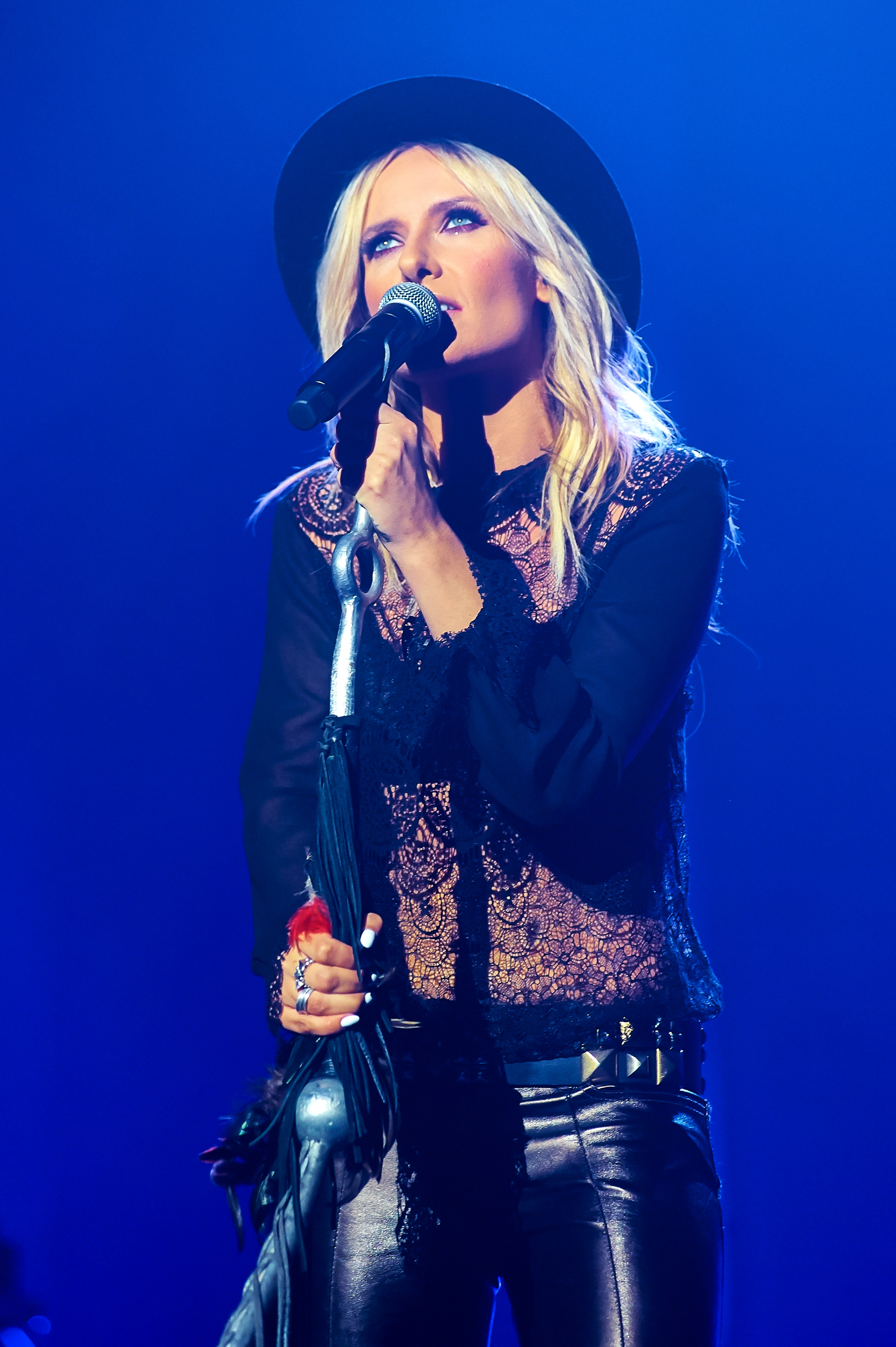
Patrycja Markowska

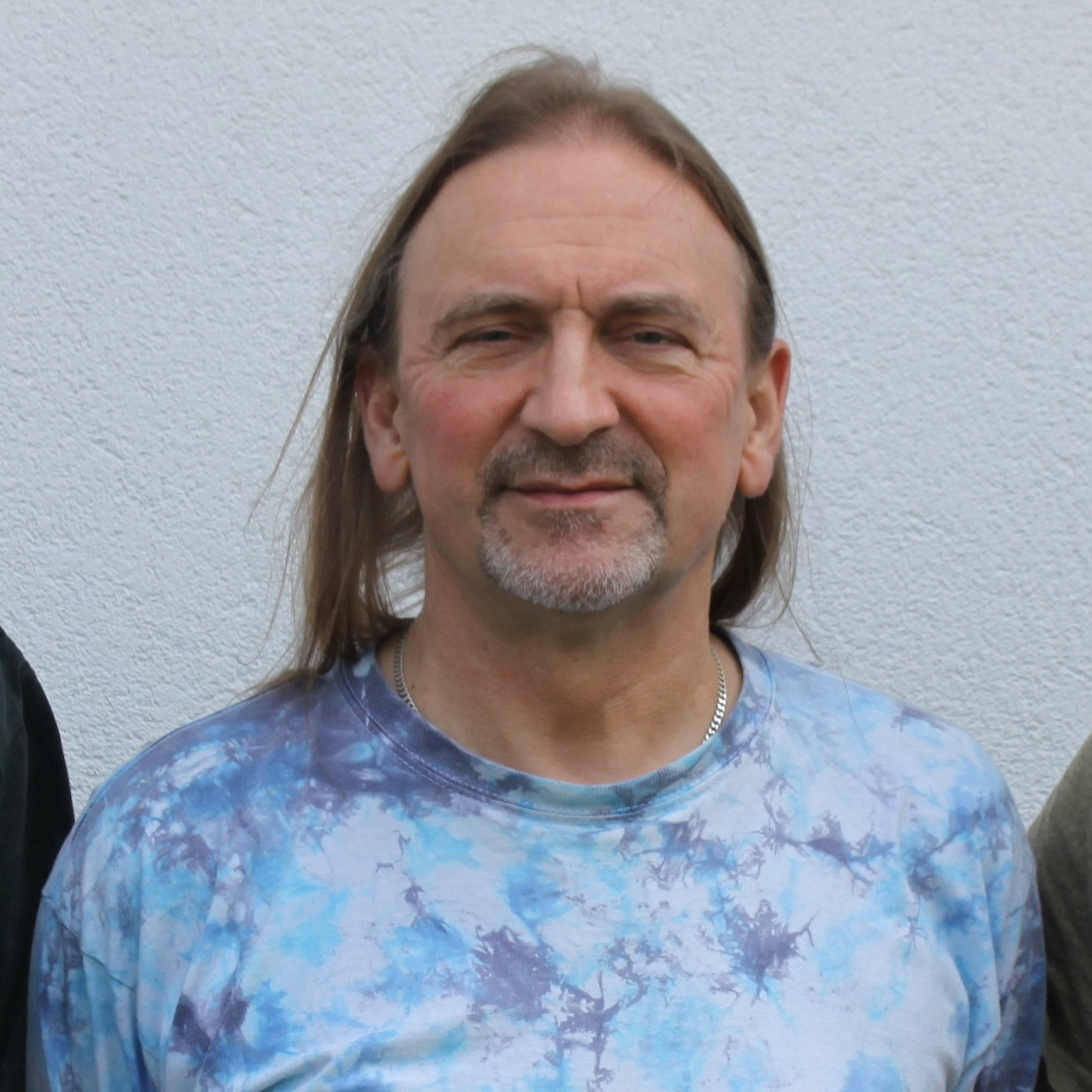
Marek Piekarczyk

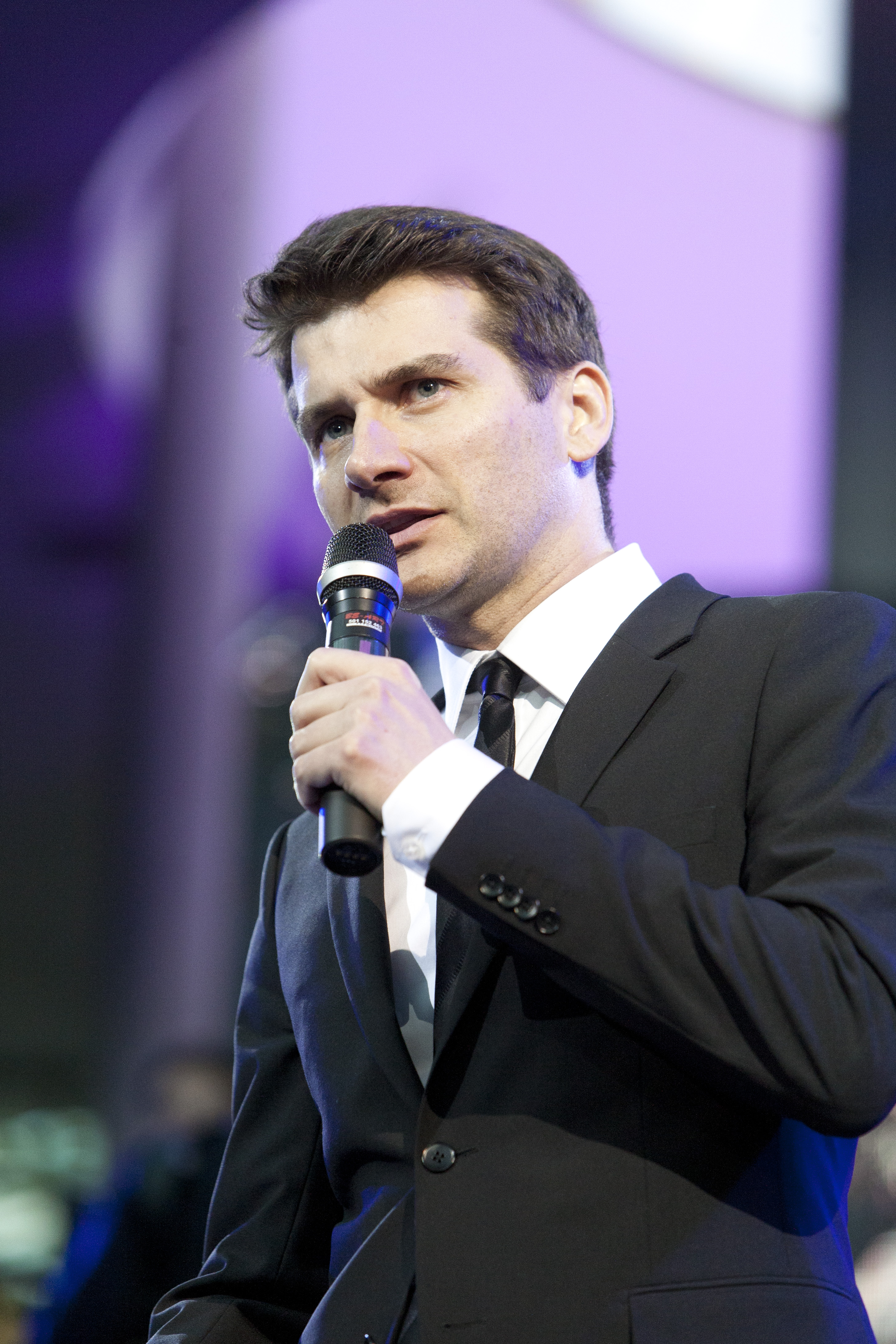
Tomasz Kammel

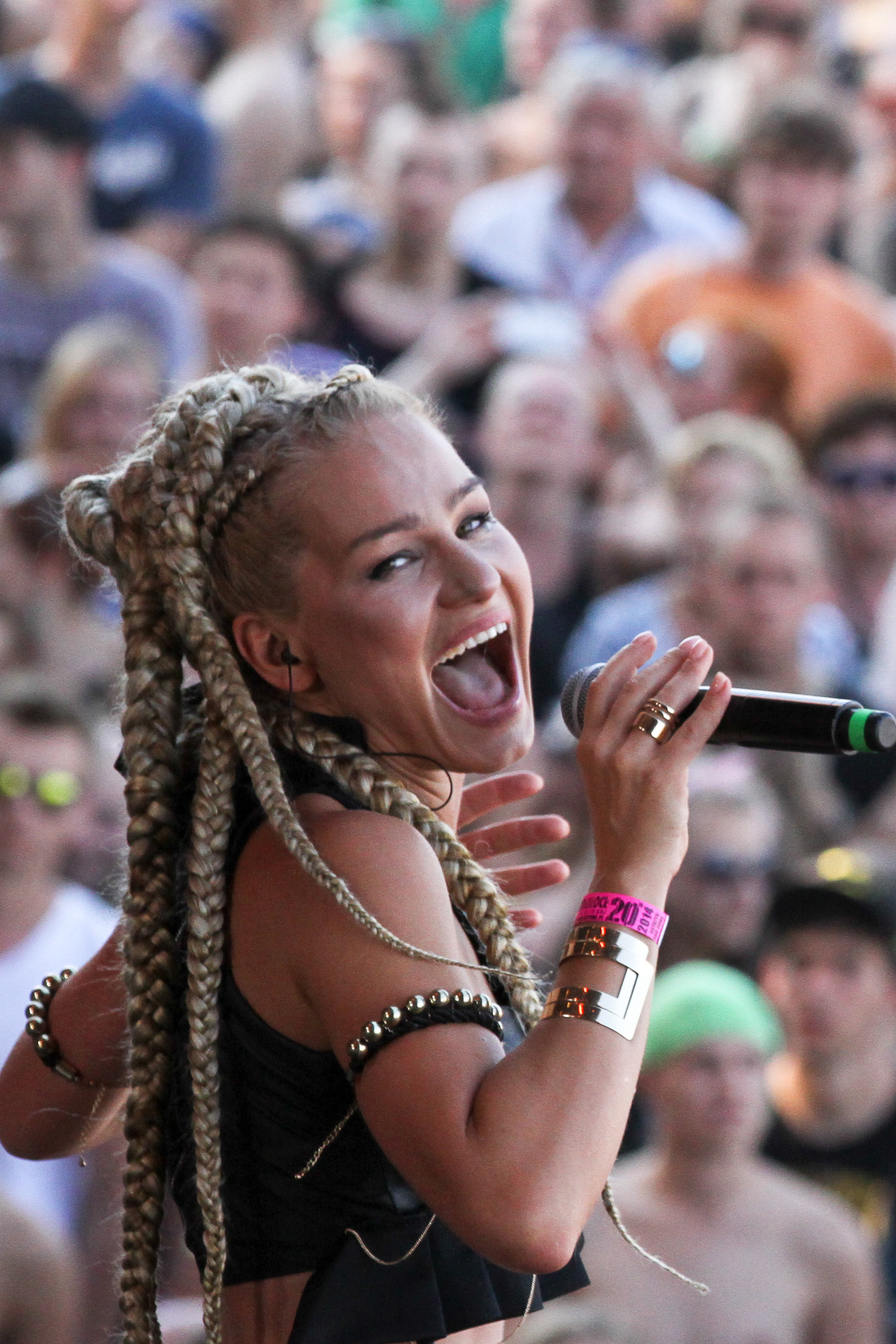
Marta "Marika" Kosakowska

== Teams ==
Color key

- Winner
- Runner-up
- Third place
- Fourth place
- Eliminated in the Semifinals
- Eliminated in the Quarterfinals
- Eliminated in the Live round
- Eliminated in the Knockout round
- Artist was stolen by another coach (Name is struckthrough)
- Eliminated in the Battle rounds

Coaches	Top 48 artists				
Justyna Steczkowska					
Justyna Steczkowska	Michał Sobierajski	Monika Szczot	Beata Dobosz	Michalina Brudnowska	Bartek Kawałek
Justyna Steczkowska	Beata Jankowska-Tzimas	Sabina SaGo	Mateusz Cieślak	Małgorzata Bigaj	Alicja Wasita
Justyna Steczkowska	Agata Świerczewska	Narine Torosyan	Patrycja Ciska		
Tomson & Baron					
Tomson & Baron	Dorota Osińska	Katarzyna Dereń	Michał Jabłoński	Anna Ozner	Mateusz Grędziński
Tomson & Baron	Bartosz Zawadzki	Magdalena Tul	~~Jan Traczyk~~	Daria Kutkowska	Magdalena Wasylik
Tomson & Baron	Marta Zywar	Karolina Jarzyńska	Jacek Maślanka		
Patrycja Markowska					
Patrycja Markowska	Natalia Nykiel	Żaneta Lubera	Justyna Panfilewicz	Jurand Wójcik	Jan Traczyk
Patrycja Markowska	Monika Szostak	Łukasz Choroń	~~Juliusz Kamil~~	~~Sabina SaGo~~	Natalia Iwaniec
Patrycja Markowska	Kamila Apryas	Małgorzata Główka	Ola Niewęgłowska		
Marek Piekarczyk					
Marek Piekarczyk	Natalia Sikora	Juliusz Kamil	Wojciech Gruszczyński	Basia Janyga	Magdalena Bałdych
Marek Piekarczyk	Kinga Kutrzuba	Piotr Salata	~~Dorota Osińska~~	Monika Tyburska	Karolina Żuk
Marek Piekarczyk	Patrycja Makowska	Jakub Hutek	Joanna Zubkowicz		
Stolen artists are italicized.

== Blind Auditions ==
The Blind Auditions took place from 8 to 11 February 2013.

Color keys

✔	Coach hit his/her "I WANT YOU" button
	Artist defaulted to this coach's team
	Artist elected to join this coach's team
	Artist eliminated with no coach pressing his or her "I WANT YOU" button

=== Episode 1 (March 2, 2013) ===
Order	Artist	Age	Hometown	Song	Coach's and contestant's choices			
Order	Artist	Age	Hometown	Song	Justyna	Tomson & Baron	Patrycja	Marek
1	Natalia Nykiel	18	Piecki	"Trouble"	✔	—	✔	—
2	Jan Traczyk	27	Warsaw	"Lemon Tree"	✔	✔	✔	✔
3	Filip Rychcik	22	Warsaw	"Locked Out of Heaven"	—	—	—	—
4	Michalina Brudnowska	30	Warsaw	"Boskie Buenos"	✔	✔	✔	✔
5	Natalia Sikora	27	Słupsk	"Cry Baby"	✔	✔	✔	✔

Non-competition performances
Order	Performers	Song
1	Coaches	"Tysiące głosów"

=== Episode 2 (March 2, 2013) ===
Order	Artist	Age	Hometown	Song	Coach's and contestant's choices			
Order	Artist	Age	Hometown	Song	Justyna	Tomson & Baron	Patrycja	Marek
1	Alicja Wasita	17	Warsaw	"Skinny Love"	✔	✔	✔	✔
2	Jurand Wójcik	37	Wałbrzych	"Tak... Tak... to ja"	—	✔	✔	—
3	Dorota Kaczorek	N/A	Mińsk Mazowiecki	"Tak blisko"	—	—	—	—
4	Bartosz Zawadzki	28	Poznań	"Enter Sandman"	✔	✔	✔	✔
5	Marta Zywar	22	Szczecin	"You Are So Beautiful"	✔	✔	—	✔
6	Michał Sobierajski	19	Poznań/Gliwice	"You Are the Sunshine of My Life"	✔	✔	✔	✔
7	Marcelina Kopyt	20	Radom	"Skyfall"	—	—	—	—

=== Episode 3 (March 9, 2013) ===
Order	Artist	Age	Hometown	Song	Coach's and contestant's choices			
Order	Artist	Age	Hometown	Song	Justyna	Tomson & Baron	Patrycja	Marek
1	Monika Szczot	24	Kalisz	"I Follow Rivers"	✔	✔	✔	✔
2	Kinga Kutrzuba	24	Kraków	"Co mi Panie dasz?"	—	—	—	✔
3	Katarzyna Dereń	28	Warsaw	"Move in the Right Direction"	✔	✔	✔	✔
4	Julia Iwańska	26	N/A	"51"	—	—	—	—
5	Beata Dobosz	26	Nowy Sącz	"End of the Road"	✔	✔	✔	✔
6	Juliusz Kamil	36	Zabrze	"Roxanne"	✔	✔	✔	✔

=== Episode 4 (March 9, 2013) ===
Order	Artist	Age	Hometown	Song	Coach's and contestant's choices			
Order	Artist	Age	Hometown	Song	Justyna	Tomson & Baron	Patrycja	Marek
1	Żaneta Lubera	26	Tarnów	"Sober"	✔	✔	✔	✔
2	Michał Chmielewski	23	N/A	"We Are Young"	—	—	—	—
3	Agata Świerczewska	23	Warsaw	"Tears in Heaven"	✔	—	✔	✔
4	Wojciech Gruszczyński	35	Katowice	"Isn't She Lovely?"	✔	✔	✔	✔
5	Magdalena Tul	32	Gdańsk	"Crazy in Love"	✔	✔	✔	—
6	Dorota Osińska	34	Wrocław	"Calling You"	✔	✔	✔	✔

=== Episode 5 (March 16, 2013) ===
Order	Artist	Age	Hometown	Song	Coach's and contestant's choices			
Order	Artist	Age	Hometown	Song	Justyna	Tomson & Baron	Patrycja	Marek
1	Tobiasz Pietrzyk	19	Ostrów Wielkopolski	"Rock&Rollin' Love"	—	—	—	—
2	Basia Janyga	27	Jaworzno	"Rehab"	—	✔	—	✔
3	Justyna Panfilewicz	28	Skierniewice	"Just Like a Pill"	—	—	✔	—
4	Karolina Jarzyńska	22	Warsaw	"Georgia on My Mind"	—	✔	✔	✔
5	Narine Torosyan	30	Yerevan, Armenia/Warsaw	"Price Tag"	✔	—	—	—
6	Michał Jabłoński	29	Warsaw	"One"	✔	✔	✔	✔

=== Episode 6 (March 16, 2013) ===
Order	Artist	Age	Hometown	Song	Coach's and contestant's choices			
Order	Artist	Age	Hometown	Song	Justyna	Tomson & Baron	Patrycja	Marek
1	Jacek Maślanka	23	Warsaw	"Byłaś serca biciem"	✔	✔	—	—
2	Joanna Zubkowicz	23	Węgorzewo	"Run to the Hills"	—	—	—	✔
3	Bartek Kawałek	17	Piotrowice	"Trouble"	✔	—	—	✔
4	Kasia Kawałek	16	Piotrowice	"Nigdy więcej nie tańcz ze mną"	—	—	—	—
5	Ola Niewęgłowska	20	Końskie	"Forget You"	—	—	✔	—
6	Marta Pyda	36	Częstochowa	"Mister of America"	—	—	—	—
7	Anna Ozner	33	Zielona Góra	"I'm Every Woman"	✔	✔	✔	✔

=== Episode 7 (March 23, 2013) ===
Order	Artist	Age	Hometown	Song	Coach's and contestant's choices			
Order	Artist	Age	Hometown	Song	Justyna	Tomson & Baron	Patrycja	Marek
1	Sebastian Łukaszuk	25	Giżycko	"Urke"	—	—	—	—
2	Monika Tyburska	23	Płock	"Kołysanka dla nieznajomej"	—	—	—	✔
3	Daria Kutkowska	26	Września	"If I Ain't Got You"	—	✔	—	—
4	Łukasz Choroń	33	Opole	"Born in the U.S.A."	—	—	✔	✔
5	Małgorzata Główka	20	Kielce	"Oko za oko, słowo za słowo"	—	—	✔	✔
6	Piotr Salata	49	Końskie	"Georgia on My Mind"	✔	✔	✔	✔

=== Episode 8 (March 23, 2013) ===
Order	Artist	Age	Hometown	Song	Coach's and contestant's choices			
Order	Artist	Age	Hometown	Song	Justyna	Tomson & Baron	Patrycja	Marek
1	Kamila Apryas	23	Lędyczek	"Dude (Looks Like a Lady)"	—	✔	✔	✔
2	Małgorzata Bigaj	24	Dąbrowa Górnicza	"Skyfall"	✔	—	✔	✔
3	Mateusz Dembek	20	N/A	"Candy"	—	—	—	—
4	Magdalena Bałdych	31	Gorzów Wielkopolski	"Tatuaż"	—	—	—	✔
5	Agata Kuśmierczyk	18	Józefów	"Rehab"	—	—	—	—
6	Magdalena Wasylik	17	Sieradz	"Virtual Insanity"	—	✔	✔	✔

=== Episode 9 (March 30, 2013) ===
Order	Artist	Age	Hometown	Song	Coach's and contestant's choices			
Order	Artist	Age	Hometown	Song	Justyna	Tomson & Baron	Patrycja	Marek
1	Monika Szostak	16	Garwolin	"For Once in My Life"	—	—	✔	✔
2	Mateusz Cieślak	21	Olsztyn	"Rolling in the Deep"	✔	—	—	✔
3	Patrycja Makowska	18	Ełk	"Diamonds"	—	—	—	✔
4	Beata Jankowska-Tzimas	43	Gołdap	"Moje serce to jest muzyk"	✔	—	—	—
5	Sabina SaGo	30	Opole	"Queen of the Night"	✔	✔	✔	✔
6	Patryk Kaim	20	Warsaw	"Pray 4 Love"	—	—	—	—
7	Karolina Żuk	28	Kołobrzeg	"Kukułeczka kuka"	—	—	—	✔

=== Episode 10 (March 30, 2013) ===
Order	Artist	Age	Hometown	Song	Coach's and contestant's choices			
Order	Artist	Age	Hometown	Song	Justyna	Tomson & Baron	Patrycja	Marek
1	Natalia Iwaniec	26	Zielona Góra	"Virtual Insanity"	—	—	✔	✔
2	Jakub Hutek	26	Warsaw	"Unchained Melody"	✔	✔	—	✔
3	Monika Niedek	29	Warsaw	"Za późno"	—	—	—	—
4	Patrycja Ciska	20	Warsaw	"If I Ain't Got You"	✔	—	—	✔
5	Oleksandra Zhuravel	N/A	Ternopil, Ukraine/Warsaw	"Million alyh roz"	—	—	—	—
6	Mateusz Grędziński	21	Olsztyn	"Fuck You"	✔	✔	—	✔

== The Battle Rounds ==
The Battle Rounds took place on 9 and 10 March. 'Steals' were introduced this season, where each coach can steal one contestant from another team when he/she lost his/her battle round.

Color keys

Artist won the Battle and advances to the Knockouts
Artist lost the Battle but was stolen by another coach and advances to the Knockouts
Artist lost the Battle and was eliminated

Episode & Date	Coach	Order	Winner	Song	Loser	'Steal' result			
Episode & Date	Coach	Order	Winner	Song	Loser	Justyna	Tomson & Baron	Patrycja	Marek
Episode 11 (April 6)	Tomson & Baron	1	Bartosz Zawadzki	"With a Little Help from My Friends"	Jacek Maślanka	—	—N/a	—	—
Episode 11 (April 6)	Justyna Steczkowska	2	Beata Dobosz	"Set Fire to the Rain"	Patrycja Ciska	—N/a	—	—	—
Episode 11 (April 6)	Marek Piekarczyk	3	Natalia Sikora	"Czas nas uczy pogody"	Dorota Osińska	✔	✔	✔	—N/a
Episode 11 (April 6)	Patrycja Markowska	4	Łukasz Choroń	"Broken Strings"	Ola Niewęgłowska	—	—N/a	—N/a	—
Episode 11 (April 6)	Tomson & Baron	5	Anna Ozner	"Fallin'"	Karolina Jarzyńska	—	—N/a	—	—
Episode 11 (April 6)	Justyna Steczkowska	6	Monika Szczot	"Ain't No Other Man"	Narine Torosyan	—N/a	—N/a	—	—
Episode 11 (April 6)	Marek Piekarczyk	7	Magdalena Bałdych	"Naiwne pytania"	Jakub Hutek	—	—N/a	—	—N/a
Episode 11 (April 6)	Patrycja Markowska	8	Żaneta Lubera	"It's My Life"	Sabina SaGo	✔	—N/a	—N/a	—
Episode 12 (April 13)	Marek Piekarczyk	1	Basia Janyga	"Za daleko mieszkasz miły"	Patrycja Makowska	—N/a	—N/a	—	—N/a
Episode 12 (April 13)	Patrycja Markowska	2	Monika Szostak	"I Wanna Dance with Somebody"	Małgorzata Główka	—N/a	—N/a	—N/a	—
Episode 12 (April 13)	Tomson & Baron	3	Michał Jabłoński	"All for Love"	Jan Traczyk	—N/a	—N/a	✔	—
Episode 12 (April 13)	Justyna Steczkowska	4	Beata Jankowska-Tzimas	"Ludzkie gadanie"	Agata Świerczewska	—N/a	—N/a	—N/a	—
Episode 12 (April 13)	Marek Piekarczyk	5	Wojciech Gruszczyński	"Mówię Ci, że"	Joanna Zubkowicz	—N/a	—N/a	—N/a	—N/a
Episode 12 (April 13)	Patrycja Markowska	6	Jurand Wójcik	"Do kołyski"	Kamila Apryas	—N/a	—N/a	—N/a	—
Episode 12 (April 13)	Tomson & Baron	7	Magdalena Tul	"Only Girl (In the World)"	Magdalena Wasylik	—N/a	—N/a	—N/a	—
Episode 12 (April 13)	Justyna Steczkowska	8	Michał Sobierajski	"You Raise Me Up"	Alicja Wasita	—N/a	—N/a	—N/a	—
Episode 13 (April 20)	Tomson & Baron	1	Mateusz Grędziński	"Freedom! '90"	Daria Kutkowska	—N/a	—N/a	—N/a	—
Episode 13 (April 20)	Patrycja Markowska	2	Justyna Panfilewicz	"Free Your Mind"	Natalia Iwaniec	—N/a	—N/a	—N/a	—
Episode 13 (April 20)	Justyna Steczkowska	3	Bartek Kawałek	"Maybe"	Małgorzata Bigaj	—N/a	—N/a	—N/a	—
Episode 13 (April 20)	Marek Piekarczyk	4	Piotr Salata	"Wspomnienie"	Karolina Żuk	—N/a	—N/a	—N/a	—N/a
Episode 13 (April 20)	Tomson & Baron	5	Katarzyna Dereń	"Nad przepaścią"	Marta Zywar	—N/a	—N/a	—N/a	—
Episode 13 (April 20)	Patrycja Markowska	6	Natalia Nykiel	"Billie Jean"	Juliusz Kamil	—N/a	—N/a	—N/a	✔
Episode 13 (April 20)	Marek Piekarczyk	7	Kinga Kutrzuba	"Poszłabym za Tobą"	Monika Tyburska	—N/a	—N/a	—N/a	—N/a
Episode 13 (April 20)	Justyna Steczkowska	8	Michalina Brudnowska	"Family Affair"	Mateusz Cieślak	—N/a	—N/a	—N/a	—N/a

== The Knockouts ==
After the Battle Round, each coach had 7 contestants for the Knockouts. Each had to choose 3 contestants who advanced to the live shows automatically. The remaining 4 contestants had to participate in the knockout battles. The contestants were not told who they were up against until the day of the Knockout. Each contestant sang a song of their own choice, back to back, and each knockout concluded with the respective coach eliminating one of the two contestants; the two winners for each coach advanced to the live shows.

=== Episode 14 (April 20, 2013) ===
Color keys

Artist won the Knockouts and advances to the Live shows
Artist lost the Knockouts and was eliminated

Order	Coach	Song	Artists		Song
1	Marek Piekarczyk	"Easy"	Piotr Salata	Basia Janyga	"Fuck You"
2	Marek Piekarczyk	"Tell Me 'bout It"	Magdalena Bałdych	Kinga Kutrzuba	"Tak... Tak... to ja"
3	Patrycja Markowska	"Locked Out of Heaven"	Łukasz Choroń	Jurand Wójcik	"Urke"
4	Patrycja Markowska	"Wonderful Life"	Jan Traczyk	Monika Szostak	"I Say a Little Prayer"
5	Justyna Steczkowska	"Need You Now"	Michalina Brudnowska	Sabina SaGo	"I Follow Rivers"
6	Justyna Steczkowska	"Sweet About Me"	Monika Szczot	Beata Jankowska-Tzimas	"Tatuaż"
7	Tomson & Baron	"Make You Feel My Love"	Anna Ozner	Magdalena Tul	"I'm Every Woman"
8	Tomson & Baron	"Dude (Looks Like a Lady)"	Mateusz Grędziński	Bartosz Zawadzki	"(I Can't Get No) Satisfaction"

== Live Shows ==
Color keys

Artist was saved by Public's vote
Artist was saved by his/her coach
Artist was eliminated

=== Episode 15 (April 27, 2013) ===
Order	Coach	Artist	Song	Result
1	Patrycja Markowska	Jan Traczyk	"The Scientist"	Eliminated
2	Patrycja Markowska	Żaneta Lubera	"Bitch"	Patrycja's choice
3	Patrycja Markowska	Jurand Wójcik	"Cicho"	Eliminated
4	Patrycja Markowska	Justyna Panfilewicz	"What's Up?"	Public's vote
5	Patrycja Markowska	Natalia Nykiel	"This World"	Public's vote
6	Justyna Steczkowska	Michalina Brudnowska	"It's Raining Men"	Eliminated
7	Justyna Steczkowska	Monika Szczot	"Im więcej Ciebie, tym mniej"	Public's vote
8	Justyna Steczkowska	Bartek Kawałek	"This Love"	Eliminated
9	Justyna Steczkowska	Beata Dobosz	"I'm Outta Love"	Justyna's choice
10	Justyna Steczkowska	Michał Sobierajski	"Fields of Gold"	Public's vote
11	Marek Piekarczyk	Wojciech Gruszczyński	"Kocham Cię"	Marek's choice
12	Marek Piekarczyk	Magdalena Bałdych	"Summer of '69"	Eliminated
13	Marek Piekarczyk	Basia Janyga	"Kwiaty we włosach"	Eliminated
14	Marek Piekarczyk	Natalia Sikora	"Whole Lotta Love"	Public's vote
15	Marek Piekarczyk	Juliusz Kamil	"Wonderful Tonight"	Public's vote
16	Tomson & Baron	Michał Jabłoński	"Sweet Home Chicago"	Public's vote
17	Tomson & Baron	Anna Ozner	"Fighter"	Eliminated
18	Tomson & Baron	Katarzyna Dereń	"Do kiedy jestem"	Tomson & Baron's choice
19	Tomson & Baron	Mateusz Grędziński	"Cry Me a River"	Eliminated
20	Tomson & Baron	Dorota Osińska	"Je t'aime"	Public's vote

=== Quarterfinal (May 4, 2013) ===
Order	Coach	Artist	Song	Result
1	Justyna Steczkowska	Beata Dobosz	"Stay"	Eliminated
2	Justyna Steczkowska	Monika Szczot	"Proud Mary"	Justyna's choice
3	Justyna Steczkowska	Michał Sobierajski	"Jej portret"	Public's vote
4	Patrycja Markowska	Justyna Panfilewicz	"If I Could Turn Back Time"	Eliminated
5	Patrycja Markowska	Natalia Nykiel	"Nothing Compares 2 U"	Public's vote
6	Patrycja Markowska	Żaneta Lubera	"Run Baby Run"	Patrycja's choice
7	Tomson & Baron	Katarzyna Dereń	"Heaven"	Tomson & Baron's choice
8	Tomson & Baron	Michał Jabłoński	"Hero"	Eliminated
9	Tomson & Baron	Dorota Osińska	"I Have Nothing"	Public's vote
10	Marek Piekarczyk	Wojciech Gruszczyński	"Can You Feel the Love Tonight"	Eliminated
11	Marek Piekarczyk	Juliusz Kamil	"Freelove"	Marek's choice
12	Marek Piekarczyk	Natalia Sikora	"Nie widzę Ciebie w swych marzeniach"	Public's vote

=== Semifinal (May 11, 2013) ===
Coach	Artist	Order	Solo song	Order	Duet	Order	Finalist's song	Summary of points			Result
Coach	Artist	Order	Solo song	Order	Duet	Order	Finalist's song	Coach's	Public's	Total	Result
Tomson & Baron	Katarzyna Dereń	1	"Sweet Dreams"	3	"Niech żyje bal"	Already eliminated		60.00	28.43	88.43	Eliminated
Tomson & Baron	Dorota Osińska	2	"Ruchome piaski"	3	"Niech żyje bal"	4	"Calling You"	40.00	71.57	111.57	Safe
Justyna Steczkowska	Monika Szczot	5	"Respect"	7	"Ktoś między nami"	Already eliminated		48.00	32.69	80.69	Eliminated
Justyna Steczkowska	Michał Sobierajski	6	"Lady (Hear Me Tonight)"	7	"Ktoś między nami"	8	"You Raise Me Up"	52.00	67.31	119.31	Safe
Marek Piekarczyk	Juliusz Kamil	9	"Little Wing"	11	"W żółtych płomieniach liści"	Already eliminated		49.00	41.47	90.47	Eliminated
Marek Piekarczyk	Natalia Sikora	10	"Soldier of Fortune"	11	"W żółtych płomieniach liści"	12	"Cry Baby"	51.00	58.53	109.53	Safe
Patrycja Markowska	Żaneta Lubera	13	"Dirty Diana"	15	"Opowieść"	Already eliminated		51.00	26.51	77.51	Eliminated
Patrycja Markowska	Natalia Nykiel	14	"Feeling Good"	15	"Opowieść"	16	"Trouble"	49.00	73.49	122.49	Safe

=== Final (May 18, 2013) ===
Coach	Artist	Order	Solo song	Order	Duet song	Duet with	Order	Duet with coach	Order	Final song	Result
Tomson & Baron	Dorota Osińska	1	"Ale jestem"	6	"Memory"	Małgorzata Walewska	12	"Najpiękniejsi"	14	"Jaskółka uwięziona"	Runner-up
Marek Piekarczyk	Natalia Sikora	5	"House of the Rising Sun"	2	"Tolerancja"	Stanisław Sojka	11	"Spóźnione pytania"	13	"With a Little Help from My Friends"	Winner
Patrycja Markowska	Natalia Nykiel	3	"Yesterday"	8	"Nad przepaścią"	Bracia	9	"Layla"	Already eliminated		Fourth place
Justyna Steczkowska	Michał Sobierajski	7	"Don't Stop the Music"	4	"Stand by Me"	Audiofeels	10	"Wracam do domu"	Already eliminated		Third place

== Results summary of live shows ==
Color keys
Artist's info

- Artist from Team Justyna
- Artist from Team Tomson & Baron
- Artist from Team Patrycja
- Artist from Team Marek

Result details

- Artist was proclaimed as winner
- Artist was proclaimed as runner-up
- Artist was proclaimed as third place
- Artist was proclaimed as fourth place
- Artist advanced to the finals
- Artist was saved by his/her coach
- Artist was saved by the public
- Artist received the fewest accumulated total points and was eliminated
- Artist received the fewest of the public's vote and was eliminated

Live show results per week
Artist	Week 1	Week 2	Week 3	Final
Natalia Sikora	Safe	Safe	Advanced	Winner
Dorota Osińska	Safe	Safe	Advanced	Runner-up
Michał Sobierajski	Safe	Safe	Advanced	3rd place
Natalia Nykiel	Safe	Safe	Advanced	4th place
Juliusz Kamil	Safe	Safe	Eliminated	Eliminated (Week 3)
Katarzyna Dereń	Safe	Safe	Eliminated	Eliminated (Week 3)
Monika Szczot	Safe	Safe	Eliminated	Eliminated (Week 3)
Żaneta Lubera	Safe	Safe	Eliminated	Eliminated (Week 3)
Beata Dobosz	Safe	Eliminated	Eliminated (Week 2)	
Justyna Panfilewicz	Safe	Eliminated	Eliminated (Week 2)	
Michał Jabłoński	Safe	Eliminated	Eliminated (Week 2)	
Wojciech Gruszczyński	Safe	Eliminated	Eliminated (Week 2)	
Anna Ozner	Eliminated	Eliminated (Week 1)		
Bartek Kawałek	Eliminated	Eliminated (Week 1)		
Basia Janyga	Eliminated	Eliminated (Week 1)		
Jan Traczyk	Eliminated	Eliminated (Week 1)		
Jurand Wójcik	Eliminated	Eliminated (Week 1)		
Magdalena Bałdych	Eliminated	Eliminated (Week 1)		
Mateusz Grędziński	Eliminated	Eliminated (Week 1)		
Michalina Brudnowska	Eliminated	Eliminated (Week 1)		
