= Chris Loco =

English record producer and songwriter

- Born: Christopher Crowhurst
- Genres: R&B; hip hop; pop
- Years active: 2009–present
- Labels: Pulse Music Group; Sony Music Publishing

Christopher Crowhurst, better known by his stage name Chris Loco, is an English record producer and songwriter.

== Discography ==
=== Production and songwriting credits ===
Year	Title	Artist	Release
2012	"Shine Ya Light"	Rita Ora	Ora
2012	"Easier in Bed"	Emeli Sandé	Our Version of Events
2012	"Trouble"	Leona Lewis	Glassheart
2012	"I to You"	Leona Lewis	Glassheart
2012	"Come Alive"	Leona Lewis	Glassheart
2012	"Un-Love Me"	Leona Lewis	Glassheart
2013	"Broken"	Daley	Days & Nights
2013	"My Heart"	Wiley featuring Emeli Sandé and French Montana	The Ascent
2013	"Lost Ones"	Tinie Tempah featuring Paloma Faith	Demonstration
2014	"Stronger Than Ever"	Raleigh Ritchie	You're a Man Now Boy
2014	"Give Me Love"	Maverick Sabre	Innerstanding
2014	"Fine"	Kylie Minogue	Kiss Me Once
2014	"Into You"	Kwabs	Pray for Love EP
2014	"Feels Like"	Etta Bond	#CoolUrbanNewTalent EP
2014	"Lullaby"	Professor Green featuring Tori Kelly	Growing Up in Public
2015	"Ego"	Chris Loco featuring Raye	See No Evil EP
2015	"Human"	Chris Loco featuring Ina Wroldsen	See No Evil EP
2015	"World We Live In"	Chris Loco featuring Etta Bond, Kojey Radical, Avelino	See No Evil EP
2015	"Is It Me"	Chris Loco featuring Eclectic	See No Evil EP
2015	"Cowards"	Raleigh Ritchie	You're a Man Now Boy
2015	"Alien"	Raye featuring Avelino	Non-album single
2015	"Ain't No Use"	Matt Woods	Non-album single
2015	"G.M.O"	Wretch 32 & Avelino featuring Youngs Teflon	Young Fire, Old Flame
2015	"Two"	Ella Eyre	Feline
2015	"Seen and Never Heard"	Etta Bond	Non-album single
2015	"Rockabye"	Elijah Blake	Shadows & Diamonds
2015	"W2TW"	Raye	Welcome to the Winter EP
2015	"Bet U Wish"	Raye	Welcome to the Winter EP
2016	"U Don't Know"	Justine Skye featuring Wizkid	Ultraviolet
2016	"Breathing Underwater"	Emeli Sandé	Long Live the Angels
2016	"Garden" (featuring Jay Electronica and Aine Zion)	Emeli Sandé	Long Live the Angels
2016	"Somebody"	Emeli Sandé	Long Live the Angels
2016	"Babe"	Emeli Sandé	Long Live the Angels
2016	"Give Me Something"	Emeli Sandé	Long Live the Angels
2017	"The River"	Raleigh Ritchie	Non-album single
2017	"Raindrops"	Kamille	My Head's a Mess EP
2017	"Give More"	Kamille	My Head's a Mess EP
2017	"Within"	Kamille	My Head's a Mess EP
2018	"Trigger"	Anne-Marie	Speak Your Mind
2018	"Did We Lose Our Minds"	Sabrina Claudio	No Rain No Flowers
2018	"Loyal"	Paloma Faith	Non-album single
2018	"Photographs"	Professor Green featuring Rag'n'Bone Man	Photographs
2018	"Strip"	Little Mix featuring Sharaya J	LM5
2018	"Love a Girl Right"	Little Mix	LM5
2018	"Monster in Me"	Little Mix	LM5
2019	"FINE"	Bulow	Crystalline EP
2019	"To the Wire"	Julian Jordan	Non-album single
2020	"Pressure"	Raleigh Ritchie	Andy
2020	"Time in a Tree"	Raleigh Ritchie	Andy
2020	"Aristocrats"	Raleigh Ritchie	Andy
2020	"Party Fear"	Raleigh Ritchie	Andy
2020	"Worries"	Raleigh Ritchie	Andy
2020	"STFU"	Raleigh Ritchie	Andy
2020	"Sadboi"	Raleigh Ritchie	Andy
2020	"Shadow"	Raleigh Ritchie	Andy
2020	"Structure"	Raleigh Ritchie	Andy
2020	"Squares"	Raleigh Ritchie	Andy
2020	"Big & Scared"	Raleigh Ritchie	Andy
2020	"Holiday"	Little Mix	Confetti
2020	"Courage"	Ruel	Bright Lights, Red Eyes
2021	"Lonely"	PRETTYMUCH	Smackables (Deluxe Edition)
2021	"Safe with Me"	Gryffin ft. Audrey Mika	Non-album single
2021	”Say What You Mean”	Raleigh Ritchie	Non-album single
