= Wasylik =

Wasylik is a Polish surname. Notable people with the surname include:

- Magdalena Wasylik (born 1995), Polish actress
- Nick Wasylik (1916–2004), American college football coach
- Tesca Andrew-Wasylik (born 1990), Canadian female volleyball player
