= The Spectrum (album) =

Studio album by Daley
- Released: 14 July 2017
- Length: 48:56
- Label: BMG; The End
- Producer: Daniel Aged; Hitesh Ceon; Chiiild; The Confect; Daley Garteth; Andre Harris; Jon Jon; Harvey Mason Jr.; George Moore; The Stereotypes; Swindle; xSDTRK

Daley chronology
Days + Nights (2014)	The Spectrum (2017)

Singles from The Spectrum
- 1. "Until the Pain Is Gone" Released: 24 March 2017; 2. "Sympathy" Released: 31 May 2017

The Spectrum is the second studio album by British recording artist Daley. It was released on 14 July 2017 through BMG and The End Records.

== Critical reception ==
The Spectrum received generally mixed reviews from music critics. Spectrum Culture editor Daniel Bromfield called that it a "frustratingly generic R&B album and not a terribly well thought-out one." He rated the album three stars out of five and wrote that "most of the best moments on the album are sourced directly from [Daley's] throat, in part because of the beauty of his vocals and in part because there’s not much else to grab one here."

== Commercial performance ==
In the United States, the album failed to chart on the Billboard 200, though it debuted and peaked at number 13 on the Independent Albums chart. It also placed seventh on the Heatseekers Albums chart.

== Track listing ==
Credits adapted from the liner notes of The Spectrum.

No.	Title	Writer(s)	Producer(s)	Length
1.	"Introlude"	Daley; Hitesh Ceon	Ceon; Daley	0:49
2.	"Until the Pain Is Gone" (featuring Jill Scott)	Daley; Ceon	Ceon; Daley	3:45
3.	"Selfish"	Daley; Yonatan Ayal; Lisa Scinta	xSDTRK	3:56
4.	"Temple"	Daley; Daniel Aged	Aged; Daley	3:38
5.	"Slow Burn"	Daley; Jon Jon; Claude Kelly	Jon Jon	3:13
6.	"Sympathy" (featuring Swindle)	Daley; Swindle; Alex Talan	Swindle	3:49
7.	"The Only One"	Daley; Louis Brennan; Eric Hudson	Daley	4:30
8.	"On Fire"	Daley; Roses Gabor; The Stereotypes	The Stereotypes	4:06
9.	"Second to None"	Daley; Harvey Mason Jr.; Damon Thomas; Dewain Whitmore	Mason	4:18
10.	"True"	Daley; Andre Harris	Harris; Daley	4:45
11.	"Distance"	Daley; The Confect	The Confect	4:21
12.	"The Fabric (For Richard)"	Daley; George Moore	Moore	4:24
13.	"Careless" (featuring Chiiild)	Daley; Ayal	xSDTRK	3:23
Total length:				48:56

== Charts ==
Weekly chart performance for The Spectrum
Chart (2013)	Peak position
US Independent Albums (Billboard)	13
US Heatseekers Albums (Billboard)	7
