= Tzimas =

Tzimas is a surname. Notable people with the surname include:

- Andreas Tzimas (1909–1972), Greek politician
- Beata Jankowska-Tzimas (born 1970), Polish singer
- Panagiotis Tzimas (born 2001), Greek footballer
- Stefanos Tzimas (born 2006), Greek footballer
