= Alone Together (EP) =

EP by Daley
- Released: 6 November 2012
- Length: 22:57
- Label: Polydor; Republic

Daley chronology
Those Who Wait (2012)	Alone Together (2012)	Days + Nights (2014)

Singles from Alone Together
- 1. "Remember Me" Released: 9 December 2012

Alone Together is an extended play (EP) by British singer-songwriter Daley. It was released on digitally on 6 November 2012 in United States and on 2 December 2012 in United Kingdom. The EP's lead single was the track "Remember Me" featuring singer Jessie J.

== Track listing ==
Alone Together track listing
No.	Title	Writer(s)	Producer(s)	Length
1.	"Alone Together" (featuring Marsha Ambrosius)	Gareth Daley; Ambrosius; Canei Finch	Finch	3:59
2.	"Blame the World"	Daley; Andrea Martin	Shea Taylor; Daley	4:19
3.	"Game Over"	Daley; Hitesh Ceon; Kim Ofstad	Elements	3:49
4.	"Remember Me" (featuring Jessie J)	Daley; Marlena Shaw; Mica Paris; Omar Lye-Fook; Richard Evans; Robert Miller; Scott Wilde	White N3rd; Paul Heard	3:08
5.	"Those Who Wait"	Daley; Ritchie Acheampong	Rich Kidd	4:19
6.	"Love Is a Losing Game" (Acoustic)	Amy Winehouse	Daley	3:23

== Weekly charts ==
Weekly chart performance for Alone Together
Chart (2013)	Peak position
US Top R&B/Hip-Hop Albums (Billboard)	64
US Heatseekers Albums (Billboard)	30

== Release history ==
Alone Together release history
Region	Date	Format(s)	Label(s)
United States	6 November 2012	Digital download	Polydor Records
United Kingdom	2 December 2012	Digital download	Universal Republic Records
