= Until the Pain Is Gone =

"Until the Pain is Gone"

Single by Daley featuring Jill Scott

from the album The Spectrum
- Released: 24 March 2017
- Genre: Pop; soul
- Length: 3:45
- Label: BMG
- Songwriter(s): Gareth Daley; Hitesh Ceon
- Producer(s): Hitesh Ceon; Andre Harris

Daley singles chronology
"Time Travel" (2014)	"Until the Pain is Gone" (2017)

"Until the Pain is Gone" is a song by British singer-songwriter Daley. The song was released as a single through BMG Rights Management on 24 March 2017, and premiered by Billboard. The song was produced by Hitesh Ceon and co-produced by Andre "Dre" Harris, and features guest vocals from Jill Scott.

== Critical reception ==
Beatrice Hazlehurst of Paper wrote: "Just when you thought RnB music was destined to become more genre multi-hyphenate than the syncopated soul we all fell in love with, in comes Daley. While Daley's expert simulation of OG RnB may come as a surprise given the fact Daley is red-haired British boy, but his latest offering, "Until the Pain is Gone", proves he deserves to be in the same arena as the greats."

== Music video ==
The music video was premiered on 31 March 2017, and is directed by Julian Schratter.

== Personnel ==
- Daley – vocals, composition
- Jill Scott – vocals
- Hitesh Ceon – production, composition, instruments
- Andre Harris – co-production, instruments
- Francis Murray – recording

== Charts ==
=== Weekly charts ===
Chart (2017)	Peak position
US Adult R&B Songs (Billboard)	6

=== Year-end charts ===
Chart (2017)	Position
US Adult R&B Songs (Billboard)	21
