= Remember Me (Daley song) =

Single by Daley featuring Jessie J

from the EP Alone Together
- Released: 9 December 2012
- Recorded: 2012
- Genre: Pop, soul
- Length: 3:09
- Label: Universal Republic
- Songwriter(s): Gareth Daley, Omar Lye-Fook, Mica Paris, Scott Wild, Richard Bethely, Alexis Blackmore, Robert Miller, Richard Evans, Marlena Shaw
- Producer(s): White N3rd, Balistiq

Daley singles chronology
"Alone Together" (2012)	"Remember Me" (2012)	"Broken" (2013)

Jessie J singles chronology
"Silver Lining (Crazy 'Bout You)" (2012)	"Remember Me" (2012)	"Wild" (2013)

"Remember Me" is the first single by English singer Daley taken from his second EP, Alone Together. It was released on 9 December 2012 through Levels/Polydor/Universal Republic Records. The song features guest vocals from English singer-songwriter Jessie J. Produced by White N3rd and Balistiq, it samples "I Should've Known Better" by Mica Paris and Omar, as well as Blue Boy's song of the same name.

== Background and composition ==
"Remember Me" is sung with soulful vocals by both Daley and Jessie J, and samples 'Should've Known Better' by Mica Paris (co-written by Omar) and "Woman of the Ghetto" by Marlena Shaw, in a similar manner to The Blue Boy's use of the same samples in his track of the same name. The song was produced by White N3rd and Balistiq – the production duo behind some of Delilah’s best known tracks, and Paul Heard (Wretch 32, "Don’t Go").

The single quickly gained early spins from BBC Radio 1 as well as being added straight to Choice FM, KISS FM and BBC Radio 1Xtra's playlists. The single trended at Number 2 on UK Twitter during its first ever radio play.

== Track listing ==
- Digital download EP
1. "Remember Me" (featuring Jessie J) – 3:08
2. "Remember Me" (MJ Cole Vocal Remix) – 5:55
3. "Remember Me" (MJ Cole Dub Remix) – 8:07
4. "Love Is a Losing Game" (Acoustic Version) – 3:23

== Critical reception ==
Krishma Kudhail of GRM Daily, who gave the song four stars out of five, wrote, "'Remember Me' sounds like a combination of soul and pop and Daley’s voice blends very well with the tempo of the beat. Daley and Jessie J show off their strong vocals, whilst also showing how well they can harmonize together. Daley proves how soulful he is to make it clear to his audience, that he is definitely a soul singer. This single gives a different flavour to UK music, for example, like the type of music Amy Winehouse made."

== Music video ==
Jessie J and Daley in the music video for 'Remember Me'.

The music video was premiered on 26 October 2012. The video features both Daley and Jessie J in front of a camera. Effects include bass-cones vibrating milk and cassettes catching fire. Jessie is seen with a long wavy hair-do, back to back with Daley as the song progresses.

== Personnel ==
- Daley – vocals, composition
- Jessie J – vocals

Production

- Balistiq – production
- Wez Clarke – mixing

== Charts ==
Chart (2012–2013)	Peak position
Slovakia (Rádio Top 100)	14
UK Singles (OCC)	24

== Release history ==
Region	Date	Format	Label
United Kingdom	9 December 2012	Digital download	Universal Records
