= Hitesh Ceon =

Icelandic musician (born 1974)

- Also known as: Helgi Már Hübner
- Born: 17 April 1974 (age 52); Hella, Iceland
- Genres: Hip hop, R&B, pop, soul
- Occupations: Producer, musician, songwriter, composer, arranger
- Instruments: Keyboards, programming
- Years active: 1991–present
- Labels: ELEMENT, Two Steps from Hell, Sony Music, Warner Music Group
- Website: www.elementmusicworld.com, www.ceonmusic.com

Hitesh Ceon (born 17 April 1974) is an Icelandic songwriter, producer and composer. He was a part of the production duo Element before it was disbanded in 2016. Hitesh has produced and written songs for artists like Madcon, CeeLo Green, Musiq Soulchild, Alexandra Burke, Snoop Dogg, Daley, Rick Ross, and reproduced two tracks with Michael Jackson for Motown Records.

Hitesh produced and co-wrote the song "Until the Pain Is Gone" with Daley featuring Jill Scott. It was released 24 March 2017 and reached number six on the Billboard R&B chart.

As a composer, Hitesh has worked on three albums with cinematic trailer music company Two Steps from Hell, called "Open Conspiracy" (2014), "Mind Tracer" (2020), "Insurgent" (2021) as well as a hybrid orchestral album called "Devotion" (2018), released with trailer music label Moon & Sun.

Hitesh produced the song "Beautiful" with Taylor Dayne, and wrote the song together with Taylor. The song was released in 2007 and became a number 1 on the Billboard Club Chart.

Hitesh produced and co-wrote the song "It's OK" with CeeLo Green, which was the second single form the album "The Lady Killer". The album received a grammy nomination.

== Grammy Awards ==
Year	Nominee / work	Award	Result
2010
2010	CeeLo Green The Lady Killer	Best Pop Vocal Album	Nominated
