= Days + Nights =

Days & Nights

Studio album by Daley
- Released: 11 February 2014
- Length: 48:41
- Label: Polydor; Republic
- Producer: Julian Bunetta; Bernard Butler; Gareth Daley; Canei Finch; Matt Hales; Andre Harris; Illangelo; Chris Loco; Happy Perez; Shea Taylor; Pharrell Williams

Daley chronology
Alone Together (2012)	Days & Nights (2014)	The Spectrum (2017)

Singles from Days & Nights
- 1. "Look Up" Released: 24 September 2013; 2. "Broken" Released: 11 November 2013

Days + Nights is the debut studio album by British recording artist Daley. It was released on 11 February 2014 by Polydor Records in the United Kingdom and Republic Records in the United States.

== Background ==
Days + Nights was produced between the United Kingdom and the United States. In the United Kingdom, Daley largely worked with producer Bernard Butler whose sound he called s a "little bit more minimal." Abroad, the singer collaborated with Illangelo, Shea Taylor and Andre Harris. It was not until late into the production of the album, that Daley was given the opportunity to work with Pharrell Williams in Los Angeles. The pair spent the first day just listening to music, barely writing anything, but "really got into it the second day" and evenetually produced the song "Look Up" which would end up on Days + Nights.

Sonically, Daley described the album as "future throwback soul," alluding to his intention to "push it not away from soul, but away from what people expect from soul music; just make it feel of its time and keep the soul at the core." The singer decided to call the album Days + Nights because he found himself "split into almost two people" when writing it, with "one person being a very positive, helpful person who was looking for love and trying to find out what that is. Then, the other person being a lot more pessimistic. It's about all that stuff and the reasons why. So, it's coming from two different perspectives."

== Critical reception ==
Professional ratings
Review scores
Source	Rating
AllMusic	4/5 stars
Financial Times	3/5 stars
MusicOMH	1.5/5 stars
Renowned for Sound	3/5 stars

Days + Nights received generally mixed reviews from music critics. AllMusic editor Andy Kellman found the album "brilliantly put together" and declared it "one of 2014's best debuts." He noted that "that album courses through many moods and modes, yet it's impressively unified." Financial Times journalist Ludovic Hunter-Tilney found that Daley "picked up several influential accomplices along the way, including Pharrell Williams who has produced the seductive "Look Up", a highlight among the sophisticated but too restrained songs on display here. MOBO editor Adenike Gboyega wrote that "on Days + Nights, Daley flips the script and offers a heartfelt, soulful album that shows he is a serious and lasting performer." He noted that "this album has the sound of an artist who is beginning to go places. And thats a good sound to hear in the hands of one so obviously gifted in music and song."

Samantha Kennedy from Vibe called Days + Nights a "courageously emo album." She felt that "Daley truly takes you into his own life experiences with this album, tearing his heart open and letting it bleed [...] After listening, you find his jam-packed LP is truly one-size-fits-all." Rachael McArthur, writing for Renowned for Sound, commented that the album "is a bit of a mixed bag in my opinion and one shouldn't go into it with high expectations. With the exception of a few notable tracks within the record, the rest of the album is fair in its delivery. Not a bad effort though I don't imagine this effort to be featured on any "Best of 2014" album lists." Ross Horton, writing for online music magazine MusicOMH, called the album "a Frankenstein's monster of a record, cobbled together from EPs and singles that have appeared over the past two years." Citing "the music itself as one of the biggest problems with Days & Nights," he found that "Daley, throughout, provides a dextrous and varied vocal approach. His sultry soul emotion reveals his Bee Gees head voice in all its dramatic splendor."

== Commercial performance ==
In the United States, the album debuted and peaked at number 128 on the Billboard 200 and number 21 on the Top R&B/Hip-Hop Albums.

== Track listing ==
Credits adapted from the liner notes of Days & Nights.

No.	Title	Writer(s)	Producer(s)	Length
1.	"Time Travel"	Daley; Carlos Montagnese	Illangelo	3:53
2.	"Look Up"	Daley; Pharrell Williams	Williams	3:58
3.	"Blame the World"	Daley; Andrea Martin	Shea Taylor; Daley	4:18
4.	"Good News"	Daley; Julian Bunetta; John Ryan	Bunetta	4:04
5.	"Love + Affection"	Joan Armatrading	Matt Hales; Daley; Jonathan Quarmby^{[a]}	3:18
6.	"Be"	Daley; Andre Harris	Harris	4:15
7.	"Alone Together" (featuring Marsha Ambrosius)	Daley; Ambrosius; Canei Finch	Finch	3:59
8.	"Pass It On"	Daley; Ambrosius; Finch	Finch	3:59
9.	"Broken"	Daley; Martin; Chris Loco	Loco	3:31
10.	"She Fades"	Daley; Bernard Butler	Butler	4:09
11.	"Love Somebody"	Daley; Nathan Perez; Steve Valdez	Perez	4:49
12.	"Days + Nights"	Daley; Bernard Butler	Butler	4:37
Total length:				48:41

Notes

- ^{^[a]} signifies an additional producer

== Charts ==
Weekly chart performance for Days + Nights
Chart (2014)	Peak position
US Billboard 200	128
US Top R&B/Hip-Hop Albums (Billboard)	21
