= Jacob Anderson =

English actor and singer (born 1990)

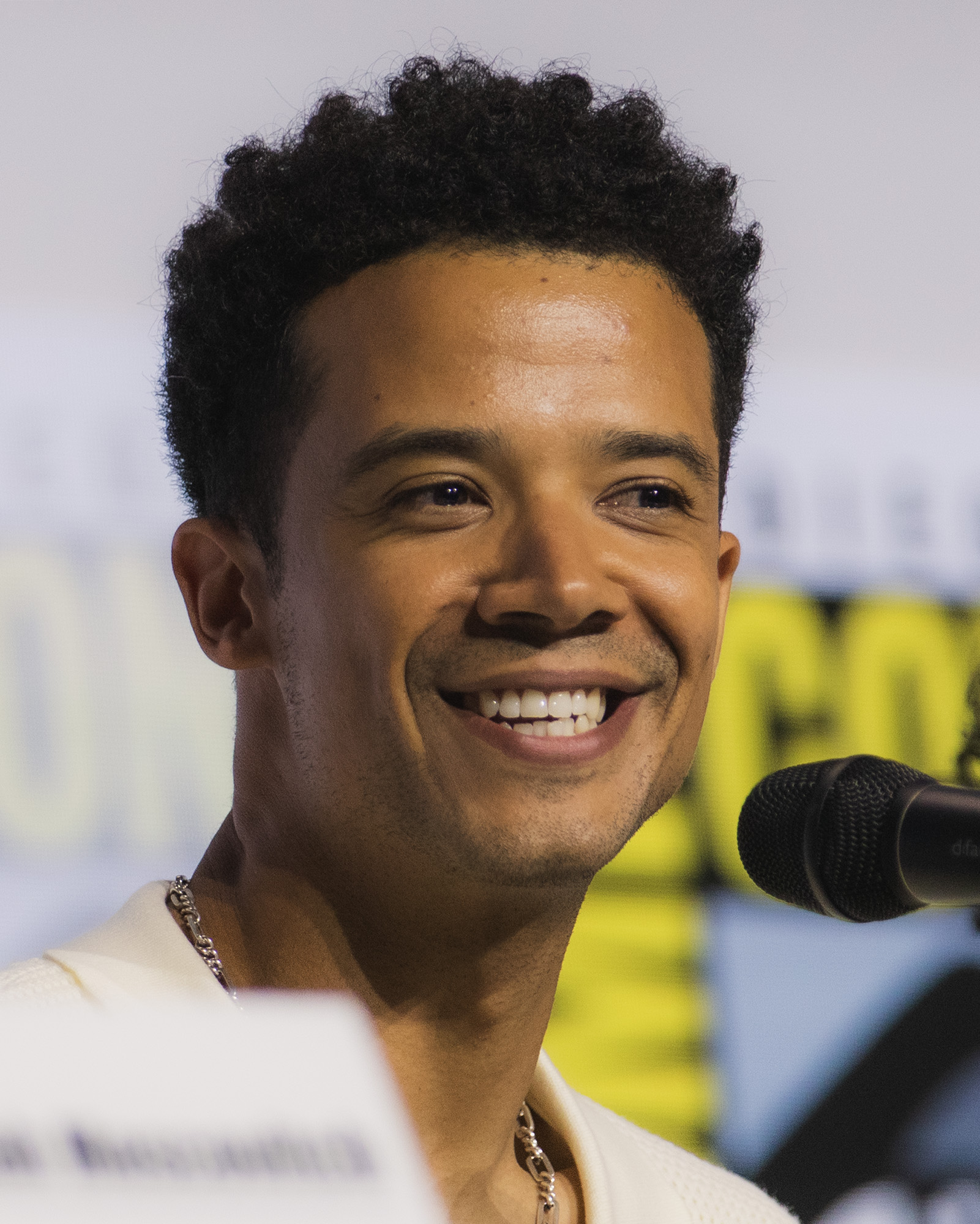
- Anderson in 2026
- Born: Jacob Basil Anderson; 18 June 1990 (age 36); Bristol, England
- Other name: Raleigh Ritchie
- Occupations: Actor; singer; songwriter; rapper
- Years active: 2007–present
- Spouse: Aisling Loftus (m. 2018)
- Children: 2
- Musical career
- Genres: Alternative R&B; trip hop; power pop
- Labels: Alacran; Columbia
- Website: raleighritchie.com

Jacob Basil Anderson (born 18 June 1990) is an English actor and musician. On television, he is known for his roles as Grey Worm in the HBO series Game of Thrones (2013–19) and Louis de Pointe du Lac in the AMC series Interview with the Vampire (2022–present). He also had recurring roles in the BBC sitcom Episodes (2012) and the ITV crime drama Broadchurch (2013), and the thirteenth series of the revival of Doctor Who (2021–22). As a soul and trip hop musician under the alias Raleigh Ritchie, he signed to Columbia Records and released the albums You're a Man Now, Boy (2016) and Andy (2020).

== Early life ==
Jacob Basil Anderson was born on 18 June 1990 in Bristol, England. His father is of Afro-Caribbean descent. His parents were divorced when he was 18 months old; he has sisters from his father's second marriage. Anderson attended Cotham School in Bristol and was encouraged to participate in school plays and started acting professionally at the age of 16. A year later, he left a film-making course to pursue a career in London.

== Career ==
=== Acting ===
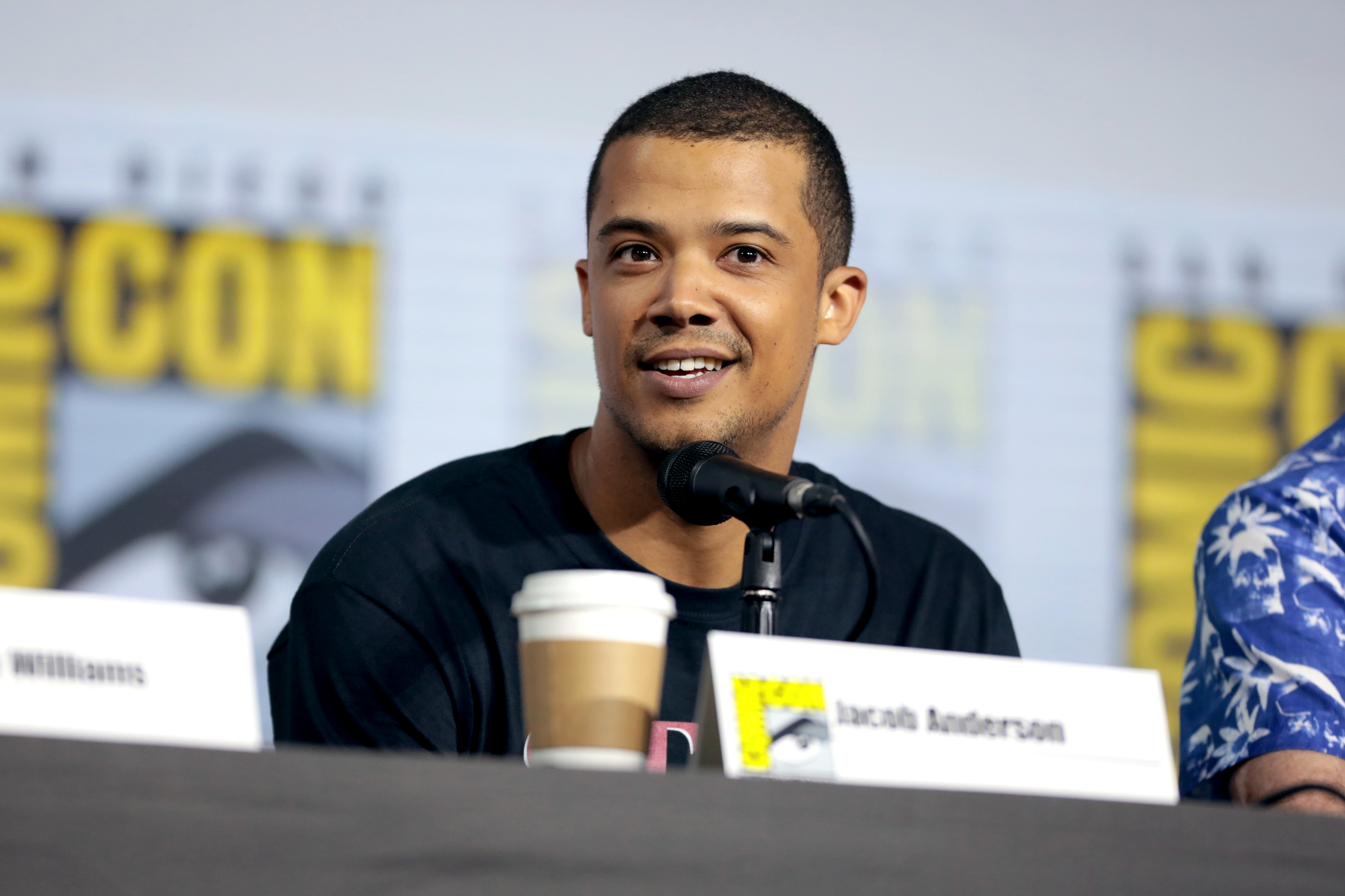
Anderson in 2019

Anderson made his feature film debut in the 2008 film Adulthood. This was followed by a role as Angelo in the 2010 film 4.3.2.1. In 2011, he starred in the ITV drama series Injustice as Simon, a teenager in a youth offender institution. He also had a guest role in the BBC One sitcom Outnumbered. In 2012, he appeared in an episode of the E4 drama Skins and reunited with his Adulthood co-star Adam Deacon the feature film Comedown, directed by Menhaj Huda. Anderson featured in various plays, including Dunsinane for the RSC, King Lear (with Pete Postlethwaite) at the Young Vic Theatre, and War Horse at the National Theatre. He was seen in the teen slasher film Demons Never Die, playing Ricky, and appeared in the BBC Two comedy Episodes, alongside Matt LeBlanc and Stephen Mangan.

In 2012, Anderson was cast for the third season of HBO's television series Game of Thrones as Grey Worm, the leader of Daenerys Targaryen's Unsullied army. Anderson continued to portray this role through season 4, season 5, season 6, season 7 and season 8. He played Dean Thomas, the boyfriend of Chloe Latimer, on the ITV drama Broadchurch in 2013. In July 2021, he was revealed to be joining the cast of Doctor Who for the 13th series.

In August 2021, Anderson was cast as the titular vampire Louis de Pointe du Lac in the AMC television series Interview with the Vampire. His performance was widely praised by critics. In their 2024 best performance reviews, Jackson McHenry of Vulture gave Anderson's performance "immense credits" for grounding the series, while Daniel Canfield of Vanity Fair praised Anderson's ability to fully embrace "the majestic emotional range required" in his portrayal.

=== Music ===
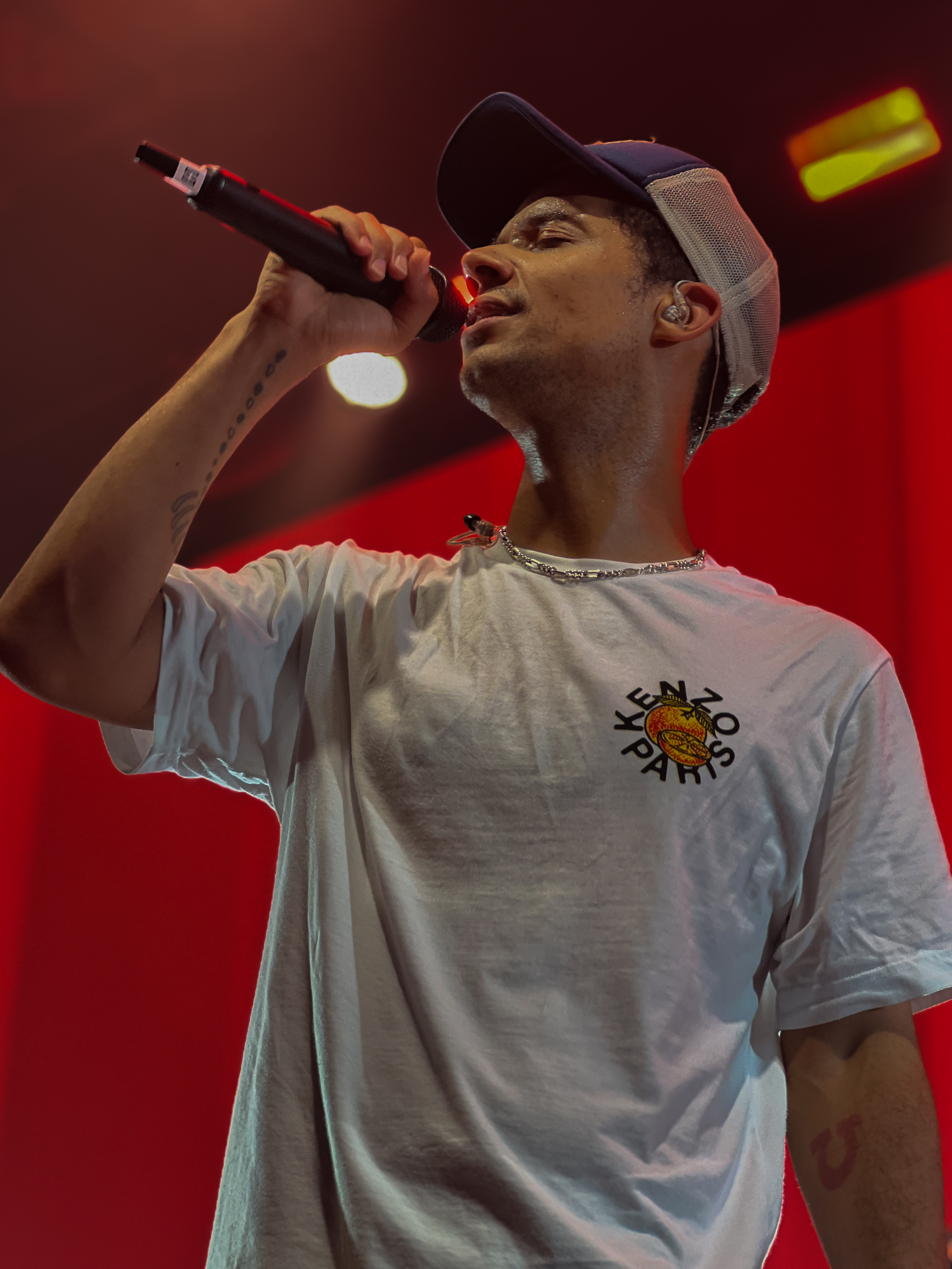
Raleigh Ritchie performing at the 2 Nights Lonely Concert 2024

==== 2005–2009: Early career ====
In 2006, Anderson was featured as a vocalist on Typesun's "The PL". They released another track in 2007, titled "Let Me Know." Anderson recorded a song with Plan B, which was featured on the Adulthood soundtrack, titled "Plan B".

==== 2010–2017: You're a Man Now, Boy ====
In 2013, Anderson signed to Columbia Records, and released a free three-track EP, The Middle Child, under the stage name Raleigh Ritchie. A second EP, Black and Blue, followed in 2014.

Anderson's musical influences include Erykah Badu, David Bowie, Jill Scott, The Smiths, and Stevie Wonder. In March 2014, his track "Stronger Than Ever" from Black and Blue was remixed by UK garage producer MJ Cole and released as a standalone single. "Stronger Than Ever" has been used in television adverts promoting the launch of ITV Encore, as well as in montage videos during Sky Sports' coverage of Professional Darts Corporation events. The song reached number 30 on the UK Singles Chart in June 2014. Anderson supported George Ezra on his February 2015 UK tour.

His debut album, You're a Man Now, Boy, was released on 26 February 2016; it charted at number 32 on the UK Albums Chart. He also featured on Stormzy's debut album Gang Signs & Prayer track 13 – "Don't Cry For Me" which was released on 24 February 2017.

==== 2020–2021: Andy ====
On 6 May 2020, Anderson released a new single called "Aristocrats". It was the second single to promote Anderson's second studio album Andy, after a 2018 single "Time In A Tree" also included on the record. In June, "Aristocrats" was followed by the songs "Party Fear" and "Squares". Andy was released on 26 June 2020 via Alacran Records.

On 30 July 2021, Anderson released the single "Say What You Mean". Robin Murray for Clash called it a "defiant return". Anderson commented, "I write songs for myself, to get things off my chest and process my emotions, but then I release them and I don't own them anymore […] I hope there is someone who listens to it and […] I hope that makes them feel less lonely." "Say What You Mean" was followed by the release of the single "Lucky".

==== 2024–present: Dead Ends and Diversions ====
On 31 May 2024, Anderson released the single "Love Is Dumb" and announced his upcoming project, Dead Ends and Diversions, which was released on 26 July 2024. It was followed by the second single "Security" on 28 June. Described as a 13-track EP, Dead Ends and Diversions features songs that had never made onto an album and several recordings from his live-stream event at The O2 Arena. Anderson held two sold-out shows at Outernet London on July 30 and 31 to support the EP.

== Personal life ==
In December 2018, Anderson married actress Aisling Loftus, after having been together for around seven years. He and Loftus have two daughters (born 2020 and 2024 respectively). Anderson and his family live in West London.

== Acting credits ==
=== Film ===
List of films, with release year and role
Year	Title	Role	Note	Ref.
2008	Adulthood	Omen (Royston Peel)		
2010	Chatroom	Si		
2010	4.3.2.1.	Angelo		
2011	Demons Never Die	Ricky		
2012	The Swarm	Calvin	Short film	
2012	Offender	Patrick		
2012	Comedown	Lloyd		
2012	Paper Mountains	Reveller Boy	Short film	
2016	Hi Maintenance		Short film	
2017	The Super Recogniser	Scott	Short film	
2018	Overlord	Private Charlie Dawson		
2020	Everything – The Real Thing Story	Narrator (voice)	Documentary on The Real Thing	
2023	Slow Burn	Tug	Short film	
2024	Timestalker	Scipio		
2025	Bad Apples	Sam		
2026	Still Life	Max	Short film	
TBA	Good People, Bad Things	Tom	Post-production	
TBA	Blaze	Vincent	Pre-production	

=== Television ===
List of television series, with release year, role and notes
Year	Title	Role	Notes	Ref.
2007	Doctors	Ryan Garvey	Episode: "Social Disease"	
2007	The Bill	Clayton Fortune	Episode: "Code of Silence"	
2007	The Whistleblowers	Anthony James	Episode: "No Child Left Behind"	
2008	Primeval	Lucien	Episode: "#2.4"	
2008	West 10 LDN	Benji	Television film	
2008	Casualty	Dom Parke	Episode: "Diamond Dogs"	
2008	The Things I Haven't Told You	Danny Rae	Television film	
2008	Spooks	Dean Mitchell	Episode: "#7.6"	
2009	Gunrush	Leo	Television film	
2010	Royal Wedding	Wesley	Television film	
2011	Injustice	Simon	Miniseries	
2011	Outnumbered	Chugger	Episode: "#4.2"	
2012	Skins	Ryan	Episode: "Mini"	
2012	Silent Witness	Dave	2 episodes	
2012	Episodes	Kevin Garillo	Recurring role (season 2)	
2012	Beaver Falls	Randy	Episode: "#2.2"	
2013–2014	The Mimic	Steven Coombs	Main role	
2013–2019	Game of Thrones	Grey Worm	Recurring role (seasons 3–7); main role (season 8)	
2013	Broadchurch	Dean Thomas	Recurring role (season 1)	
2021–2022	Doctor Who	Vinder	Recurring role (Series 13 and "The Power of the Doctor")	
2022–present	Interview with the Vampire	Louis de Pointe du Lac	Lead role	
2025	The Sandman	Daniel Hall / Dream of the Endless	2 episodes	

=== Web ===
List of web programs, with release year, role and notes
Year	Title	Role	Notes	Ref.
2016	Chicken Shop Date	Himself	1 episode	
2016-2017	Game Grumps	Himself	4 episodes	
2017	Jack and Dean of All Trades	Marcus Rose	Episode: "Librarians"	
2020	Raleigh Ritchie Live at the O2	Himself	Virtual concert	The O2

=== Stage ===
List of stage performances, with year, title, role and venue
Year	Title	Role	Venue	Ref.
2008–2009	King Lear	Boy	Everyman Theatre, Liverpool; Young Vic, London	
2009	Painting a Wall	Peter	Finborough Theatre, London	
2010	Dunsinane	Soldier	Hampstead Theatre, London	
2010–2011	War Horse	Billy Narracott	Gillian Lynne Theatre, London	

=== Radio ===
List of radio dramas, with release year, role and notes
Year	Title	Role	Notes	Ref.
2017	Anansi Boys	Charlie	BBC Radio 4	

=== Video games ===
List of video games, with release year, role and notes
Year	Title	Role	Notes	Ref.
2023	Asgard's Wrath 2	Abraxas	Voice role	

== Discography ==
- You're a Man Now, Boy (2016)
- Andy (2020)

== Awards and nominations ==
Awards and nominations received by Jacob Anderson
Award	Year (Note: The listed year refers to the date of the ceremony.)	Category	Nominee/work	Result	Ref.
Astra TV Awards	2025	Best Actor in a Drama Series	Interview with the Vampire	Nominated	
Astra TV Awards	2025	Best Cast Ensemble in a Cable Drama Series	Interview with the Vampire	Nominated	
Black Reel Awards	2023	Outstanding Lead Performance in a Drama Series	Interview with the Vampire	Nominated	
Black Reel Awards	2025	Outstanding Lead Performance in a Drama Series	Interview with the Vampire	Pending	
Critics' Choice Super Award	2023	Best Actor in a Horror Series, Limited Series or TV Movie	Interview with the Vampire	Nominated	
Dorian Awards	2024	Best TV Performance–Drama	Interview with the Vampire	Nominated	
Gold Derby Awards	2025	Drama Actor	Interview with the Vampire	Pending	
Gotham Awards	2023	Outstanding Performance in a New Series	Interview with the Vampire	Nominated	
IGN TV of the Year Awards	2019	People's Choice for Best Ensemble	Game of Thrones	Won	
MOBO Awards	2014	Best Newcomer	Raleigh Ritchie	Nominated	
MOBO Awards	2025	Best Performance in a TV Show/Film	Interview with the Vampire	Won	
National Television Awards	2024	Drama Performance	Interview with the Vampire	Longlisted	
Pride Awards	2025	Best Actor in a Series or Miniseries	Interview with the Vampire	Nominated	
Pride Awards	2025	Best Ensemble Cast (Series or Miniseries)	Interview with the Vampire	Won	
Screen Actors Guild Award	2015	Outstanding Performance by an Ensemble in a Drama Series	Game of Thrones	Nominated	
Screen Actors Guild Award	2017	Outstanding Performance by an Ensemble in a Drama Series	Game of Thrones	Nominated	
Screen Actors Guild Award	2018	Outstanding Performance by an Ensemble in a Drama Series	Game of Thrones	Nominated	
Screen Actors Guild Award	2020	Outstanding Performance by an Ensemble in a Drama Series	Game of Thrones	Nominated	
TCA Awards	2025	Individual Achievement in Drama	Interview with the Vampire	Nominated	
UK Music Video Awards	2015	Best Urban Video – UK	"Bloodsport '15 Pt 2"	Nominated	
UK Music Video Awards	2020	Best Styling in a Video	"Aristocrats"	Nominated	
Urban Music Awards	2016	Best Newcomer	Raleigh Ritchie	Nominated	
