= Natalia Nykiel =

Polish singer and songwriter (born 1995)

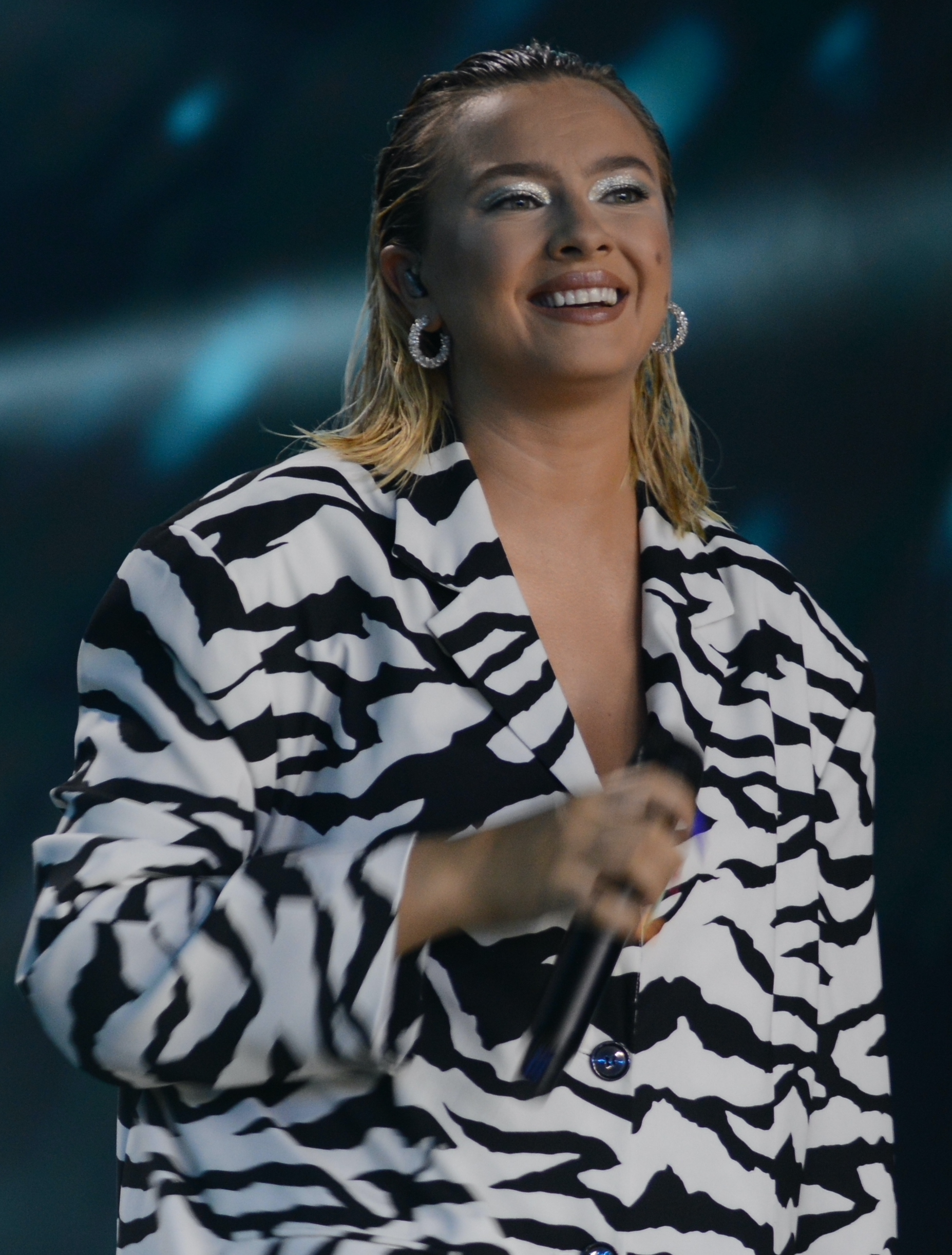
- Nykiel performing in Sopot in 2022

Background information
- Born: 8 February 1995 (age 31); Mrągowo, Poland
- Origin: Piecki, Poland
- Genre: Electropop
- Occupations: Singer; songwriter
- Instrument: Vocals
- Years active: 2012–present
- Labels: Universal Music Polska, OFF THE RECORD

Natalia Nykiel (born 8 February 1995) is a Polish singer and songwriter. She began her career in 2013, finishing in fourth place on season two of The Voice of Poland. Afterwards, she signed a record deal with Universal Music Polska, and released her debut studio album, Lupus Electro (2014). The album's second single "Bądź duży" has been certified diamond by the Polish Society of the Phonographic Industry and established Nykiel as a household name in Poland. Its success was followed by the release of the single "Error", which was also certified diamond and became Nykiel's first chart-topping hit in Poland. Her second studio album, Discordia, was released in 2017, followed by the 2019 EP Origo, which earned her the Fryderyk award.

== Life and career ==
=== Early career ===
Nykiel was born on 8 February 1995 in Mrągowo and was raised in nearby Piecki. She first began pursuing a music career when she took part in the Sing Poetry event in Olsztyn in 2012.

=== The Voice of Poland and Lupus Electro (2013–2016) ===
In 2013, at the age of eighteen, Nykiel began taking part in the second season of The Voice of Poland. She was a member of Team Patrycja Markowska. Nykiel went on to finish in fourth place, and was later signed to Universal Music Polska. In 2014, she released her debut single "Wilk" (Wolf), which had little chart success. The single was followed by the release of her debut album, Lupus Electro, in September, which also saw little success.

The following year Nykiel released a second single "Bądź duży" (Be big) which went on to become a top ten hit in Poland. The song's video won the award for Best Video at the 2015 Eska Music Awards and brought her a nomination for Best Polish Act at the 2015 MTV Europe Music Awards.

On 20 May 2016 Natalia released single "Error" for tour and DVD album. The song peaked at number one on the Polish singles chart.

=== Discordia (2017–2018) ===
May 10, 2017 she released lead single Spokój that later became her 3rd Top10 hit in Poland. Her second album, Discordia, was released on October 20 and was proclaimed by the most influential Polish media the most significant Polish release of 2017. To further promotion Natalia embarked that autumn onto Total Tour and V Tour in spring 2018 playing in the biggest clubs across Poland. Total Błękit and Kokosanki were also released as singles. The album was nominated to the most important award of the Polish phonographic industry, the Fryderyk award.

Natalia's clip for a standalone single “Łuny” received the first prize at the prestigious Queen Palm International Film Festival in Palm Springs. Natalia was chosen Woman of the Year by the “Glamour” magazine, and received the title of the Best Dressed Polish Artist, awarded by the international FashionTV channel.

=== Experimenting in music and international breakthrough with Origo EP (2019–2020) ===
November 15, 2019 Natalia released her new mini album Origo. As she explains “it is a record of internal transformations of a girl who embarks on a journey to find her roots”. This is the first work in Natalia's career released on the international market. New songs have been written by Stevie Aiello (music director of Thirty Seconds To Mars, composer of, among others, „Dangerous Night” and „Hail To The Victor”) or Daley, the British discovery of soul music, who has cooperated, among others, with Pharrell Williams. Josh Farro and Hayley Williams from Paramore agreed for a part of their hit song “Careful” to be used in Natalia's newest single “Volcano”. In one of the songs, the artist is accompanied by the folk band Rodzinny Zespół Śpiewaczy (Family Musical Group) from Rakowicze.

Some of the recording works took place at Electric Feel Studios in California, where, among others, Post Malone recorded his latest album and Rosalía her recent hits. Responsible for mastering is Grammy winner Lewis Hopking from Stardelta studio in the UK.

Natalia has been chosen one of the SXSW 2020 official artists. At the festival in Austin, TX she was meant to present live the tracks from the album Origo but the festival was cancelled due to COVID-19 pandemic.

In June 2020 she has released a country-vibe song Atlantyk and its English version Ocean.

=== Regnum (2021–2022) ===
July 14, 2021 she released P.R.I.D.E as lead single from her next polish project. On October 14 she released second official single Epoka X. Prior to album premiere she released 3 promotional songs Królestwo, Taka Jak Ty and Pętla. Described as the most personal, her third studio album, Regnum, was released February 18, 2022. Due to little promotion and poor sales it became her least successful album to date resulting in tour planned for the album being cancelled. She parted ways with Universal later that year and signed to independent label OFF THE RECORD.

In March 2021 she successfully started her podcast Zrozumieć Latino (eng. To understand latino) in which she talks about Latin music and its origins.

=== Second international release and fourth studio album (2023–present) ===
As an independent artist Natalia began to work on both English and Polish projects simultaneously. August 10, 2023 first English single Bye Bye was released followed shortly by Polish one called Delta on September 8. Another song in English Do It Again was released October 19 for her 10-year artistry anniversary celebratory that also included few limited intimate shows. Natalia started to include more choreography and advanced staging for her TV performances during that time. On September 4, 2024, she released her second international project Atom that was preceded by singles Daylight, Fair Enough and We Girls. EP also included both English songs released last year and Power - English version of Demony Polish single from April that year. During the launch of the EP Natalia became face of both Spotify's Polish and Global EQUAL campaign becoming the first Pole to become a face for the Global playlist.

Autumn 2024 she took part in Polish version of Dancing with the Stars placing 8th after highly criticized jury elimination.

Her fourth Polish studio album is expected to arrive somewhere in 2025.

== Live Performances ==
Throughout the years, Natalia Nykiel has become a popular performer in Poland. She has performed at some large festivals: Audioriver Festival, Orange Warsaw Festival, Kraków Live Festival, Electronic Beats Festival in Köln. She appeared as a special guest with Thirty Seconds to Mars and sang on stage with Jared Leto. Her concert tour promoting the Discordia album was said to be one of the most impressive concert productions of the recent years in Poland. The artist was also invited to Red Bull Stripped Sessions and performed on Saturday Night Live Poland.

== Collaborations ==
Natalia accepted Disney’s proposal to perform the lead song in the animated movie “Moana”.

Among brand partnerships she has cooperated with Yves Saint Laurent Beauty on the project YSL Beauty Music Talent Program.

== Discography ==
=== Studio albums ===
Title	Album details	Peak chart positions	Certifications
Title	Album details	POL	Certifications
Lupus Electro	Released: 23 September 2014; Label: Universal Music Polska; Format: CD, LP, digital download	—	ZPAV: Gold
Discordia	Released: 20 October 2017; Label: Universal Music Polska; Format: CD, LP, digital download	12	
Regnum	Released: 18 February 2022; Label: Universal Music Polska; Format: CD, digital download	17	
"—" denotes a recording that did not chart or was not released in that territory.

=== Extended plays ===
Title	Album details	Peak chart positions
Title	Album details	POL
Lupus EP	Released: 6 August 2014; Label: Universal Music Polska; Format: Digital download	—
Origo	Released: 15 November 2019; Label: Universal Music Polska; Format: CD, digital download	12
Atom	Released: 4 September 2024; Label: OFF THE RECORD; Format: Digital download	—
"—" denotes a recording that did not chart or was not released in that territory.

=== Live albums ===
Title	Album details
Lupus Electro Error Tour	Released: 25 November 2016; Label: Universal Music Polska; Format: CD, DVD

=== Singles ===
Title	Year	Peak chart positions		Certifications	Album
Title	Year	POL	POL New	Certifications	Album
"Wilk"	2014	—	—		Lupus Electro
"Bądź duży"	2015	7	1	ZPAV: Diamond	Lupus Electro
"Ekrany"	2015	—	—		Lupus Electro
"Error"	2016	1	1	ZPAV: Diamond	Lupus Electro Error Tour
"Pół kroku stąd"	2016	—	—	ZPAV: 2× Platinum	Vaiana: Skarb oceanu
"Pół dziewczyna"	2016	—	—		Lupus Electro
"Spokój"	2017	10	—	ZPAV: Platinum	Discordia
"Total Błękit"	2017	—	—		Discordia
"Kokosanki"	2018	—	—		Discordia
"Łuny"	2018	—	—		—
"Jak żądło"	2018	—	—		T.Cover
"Volcano"	2019	—	—		Origo
"Atlantyk"	2020	—	—		Regnum
"P.R.I.D.E."	2021	—	—		Regnum
"Królestwo"	2021	—	—		Regnum
"Epoka X"	2021	—	—		Regnum
"Pętla"	2022	—	—		Regnum
"Bye Bye"	2023	—	—		Atom
"Delta"	2023	—	—		—
"Do It Again"	2023	—	—		Atom
"Demony"	2024	—	—		—
"Daylight"	2024	—	—		Atom
"We Girls"	2024	—	—		Atom
"—" denotes singles which failed to chart.

== Awards and nominations ==
Year	Event	Category	Nominated work	Result
2015	Eska Music Awards	Best Video	"Bądź duży"	Won
2015	MTV Europe Music Awards	Best Polish Act	—N/a	Nominated
2019	Berlin Music Video Awards	Best Art Director	Kokosanki	Nominated
2020	Berlin Music Video Awards	Best Song	Volcano	Nominated
2021	Fryderyk	Album of the Year – Electronica	Origo	Won
