= You're a Man Now, Boy =

- Standard edition cover art. The deluxe edition features a pink background with "Raleigh Ritchie" in white text.

Studio album by Raleigh Ritchie
- Released: 26 February 2016
- Recorded: 2012–2016
- Genre: Alternative R&B
- Length: 46:46
- Label: Columbia
- Producer: Chris Loco; DJ Dahi; George Reid; James Dring; Justin "SumPunk" Broad; Liz Horsman; Mike Elizondo; Mike Spencer; Mikey J; Paul Herman; Raleigh Ritchie; Sounwave; Utters

Raleigh Ritchie chronology
You're a Man Now, Boy (2016)	Andy (2020)

Singles from You're a Man Now, Boy
- 1. "Stronger Than Ever" Released: 14 March 2014; 2. "Birthday Girl" Released: 7 December 2014; 3. "The Greatest" Released: 13 March 2015; 4. "Never Say Die" Released: 14 June 2015; 5. "Bloodsport '15" Released: 23 July 2015; 6. "You're a Man Now, Boy" Released: 11 December 2015; 7. "Keep it Simple" Released: 8 January 2016; 8. "Never Better" Released: 22 January 2016

You're a Man Now, Boy is the debut studio album by British R&B singer and songwriter Raleigh Ritchie, released 26 February 2016 on Columbia Records. It entered the UK Albums Chart at number 32.

== Composition ==
In an interview with Billboard, Anderson explained that "I started putting the album together properly about two years ago. But the oldest song on the album, “Never Better,” is about four years old. I’ve written hundreds of songs, and I was still writing new stuff when I was putting the album together. It was just a matter of deciding how to construct it as something that made sense of how I was feeling." He also noted Kanye West’s album The College Dropout as a source of personal inspiration for his music.

== Critical reception ==
Professional ratings
Review scores
Source	Rating
DJBooth	Very positive
The Evening Standard	4/5 stars
The Guardian	4/5 stars
MTV	Very positive

You're a Man Now, Boy received very positive reviews from critics upon release. Writing for The Evening Standard, John Aizlewood gave the album 4 stars out of 5 and described Raleigh Ritchie as "bold and cutting edge in a Jack Garratt sort of way and the fabulous The Last Romance is a life-affirming combination of confessional vocals and a massed gospel singalong. And for all the electro clutter of 'Werld Is Mine', the throaty rasp to his vocals and the smoother soul of the Stormzy-featuring 'Keep It Simple', he never loses his pop heart."

The Guardian's Dave Simpson likewise gave the album 4 stars out of 5. Noting the lengthy writing and production process for the album, "If the problematic gestation means the mix of soul, R&B, electronica and cinematic orchestral sweeps can occasionally feel a trifle uneven, the Bristolian’s emotional deliveries bring a compelling vulnerability and humanity to the narrative-verse-to-big-chorus format." Simpson notes the title track as a highlight, writing that the track's "comparison of childhood dreams with adult realities ('I was an astronaut, once upon a time. I'm not growing up. I'm ageing') is beautifully moving."

MTV's Matt Tarr wrote very positively about the album. Like Simpson, he notes the title track as a highlight of the album as well as 'Stronger Than Ever' and as "the most powerfully emotive tracks on the album, both featuring dramatic rises and falls before eventually building to intense climactic ending". He also wrote that The orchestral instrumental of the prior is truly noteworthy and wouldn't find itself amiss in a thrilling cinematic film trailer." Concluding the review, Tarr wrote that the album "is an incredible way to mark the humble beginning of an emotionally honest and sensitive artist on the mainstream stage and Raleigh Ritchie’s raw-yet-tender style is a joy to behold. Sure to catch the ear of new fans and current loyalists alike, this album will set the foundations for an exciting and boundary-pushing career in the UK music spotlight for a long while to come."

DJBooth's Lucas G. described the album as "a profoundly emotional album but just like in real life, that emotion is hidden under puns, smiles and spliff smoke. The thing I love most about the album is the way Ritchie wrestles with fear but doesn't wallow in. He stands at the top of the cliff staring into the void, occasionally dangling his feet over, but never jumping. At the same time the album struggles with adulthood identity, connections and love, the album has an upbeat, fresh sound to it."

== Track listing ==
No.	Title	Writer(s)	Producer(s)	Length
1.	"Werld Is Mine"	Jacob Anderson; Justin Broad; Paul Herman	SumPunk	4:01
2.	"Stronger Than Ever"	Anderson; Chris Loco	Chris Loco; Raleigh Ritchie	3:53
3.	"Bloodsport '15"	Anderson; Broad	SumPunk; Ritchie	4:17
4.	"I Can Change"	Anderson; Hanni Ibrahim	Mike Spencer; Liz Horsman	4:06
5.	"Keep It Simple" (featuring Stormzy)	Anderson; Mike Elizondo; Michael Omari	Elizondo	3:41
6.	"The Greatest"	Anderson; Broad; Herman	SumPunk; Herman	3:47
7.	"Never Better"	Anderson; Broad; Herman	SumPunk; Herman; James Dring	3:52
8.	"Cowards"	Anderson; Loco	Loco	3:45
9.	"A Moor"	Anderson; Dan Radclyffe; George Edward	Utters; George Reid	3:18
10.	"Young & Stupid"	Anderson; Mark Spears	Sounwave	4:34
11.	"You're a Man Now, Boy"	Anderson; Broad; Herman	SumPunk; Herman	4:24
12.	"The Last Romance"	Anderson; Broad	SumPunk	3:19
Total length:				46:46

Deluxe edition
No.	Title	Writer(s)	Producer(s)	Length
13.	"Never Say Die"	Anderson; Spears	Sounwave	4:39
14.	"Life in a Box"	Anderson; Dacoury Natche	DJ Dahi	4:23
15.	"The Chased" (with The Internet)	Anderson; Broad	SumPunk	4:11
16.	"Overdose"	Anderson; Spears; Dimitri Grimm	Sounwave	4:21
17.	"Birthday Girl"	Anderson; Broad; Herman; James Bryan	SumPunk; Herman	4:17
18.	"Stay Inside"	Anderson; Michael Asante	Mikey J	3:26
Total length:				72:03

== Personnel ==
Credits adapted from Tidal.

Musicians

- Raleigh Ritchie – vocals (all tracks), keyboards (1), background vocals (13)
- Paul Herman – guitar (1, 6, 12, 17), background vocals (6), synthesizer (6, 7, 12, 17)
- Corinne Bailey – French horn (1)
- Justin Broad – performance arrangement (1), programming (1, 6, 17), synthesizer (1, 6, 17), background vocals (6), bass (6, 7, 11, 17), guitar (7, 12), piano (7), drums (11, 12), keyboards (11)
- Rosie Danvers – performance arrangement (1–4, 7, 11), cello (2–4, 7, 11)
- Dave Stewart – trombone (1)
- Mike Lovatt – trumpet (1)
- Richard Pryce – bass (2)
- Bryony James – cello (2)
- Chris Loco – keyboards, programming (2, 8)
- Wez Clarke – programming (2, 3, 15, 16)
- Wired Strings – strings (2, 4, 7, 11)
- Emma Owens – viola (2–4, 7, 11), vocals (2)
- Nick Barr – viola (2–4, 7, 11), vocals (2)
- Alison Dods – violin (2, 3)
- Debbie Widdup – violin (2–4, 7, 11)
- Gillon Cameron – violin (2, 3)
- Helen Hathorn – violin (2–4, 7, 11)
- Jenny Sacha – violin (2–4, 7, 11)
- Kotona Sato – violin (2, 3)
- Patrick Kiernan – violin (2–4, 7, 11)
- Sally Jackson – violin (2, 3)
- Jane Oliver – cello (3, 4, 7, 11)
- Mike Spencer – background vocals, bass, drums, guitar, keyboards, programming (4)
- Anna Croad – violin (4, 7, 11)
- Ellie Stamford – violin (4, 7, 11)
- Sarah Sexton – violin (4, 7, 11)
- Sam Skirrow – bass (5)
- Jillian Chambers – drums (5)
- Mike Elizondo – keyboards, programming (5)
- Stormzy – vocals (5)
- Aisling Loftus – background vocals (6), vocals (15)
- Kerenza – Peacock (7)
- Etta Bond – vocals (8)
- George Edward – programming (9)
- Utters – programming (9)
- James Bryan – guitar (17)
- Michael Asante – background vocals (18)

Technical

- Jeremy Cooper – mastering engineer
- Dan Parry – mixing engineer (1, 6, 8, 10–14, 17)
- Wez Clarke – mixing engineer (2, 3, 7, 15, 16)
- Mike Spencer – mixing engineer, recording engineer (4)
- Mark Ralph – mixing engineer (5)
- James Reynolds – mixing engineer (9, 18)
- Chris Loco – recording engineer (2, 8)
- Nick Taylor – recording engineer (2), engineer (3, 4, 7, 11)
- Justin Broad – recording engineer (4–6), engineer (15)
- Adam Hawkins – engineer (5)
- Brent Arrowood – engineer (5)
- Cody Acosta – engineer (10)
- Sam Klempner – assistant engineer (9, 18)

== Chart performance ==
Chart (2016)	Peak position
Scottish Albums (OCC)	56
UK Albums (OCC)	32
UK Album Streaming Chart (OCC)	82
UK Album Downloads (OCC)	10
