= Andy (Raleigh Ritchie album) =

Studio album by Raleigh Ritchie
- Released: 26 June 2020
- Genre: Alternative R&B, pop
- Label: Alacran Records
- Producer: Grades, Chris Loco

Raleigh Ritchie chronology
You're a Man Now, Boy (2016)	Andy (2020)

Singles from Andy
- 1. "Time in a Tree" Released: 3 August 2018; 2. "Aristocrats" Released: 6 May 2020; 3. "Squares" Released: 23 June 2020

Andy is the second studio album by British R&B singer and songwriter Raleigh Ritchie, released on 26 June 2020 on Alacran Records. It was produced by Grades and Chris Loco and promoted by singles "Time in a Tree", "Aristocrats" and "Squares".

Professional ratings
Review scores
Source	Rating
Clash	7/10
NME	4/5 stars

== Track listing ==
No.	Title	Writer(s)	Length
1.	"Pressure"	Jacob Anderson; Christopher Crowhurst; Chad Edwards	3:03
2.	"Time in a Tree"	Anderson; Daniel Traynor	3:44
3.	"Aristocrats"	Alessandro Alessandroni; Anderson; Crowhurst; Edwards	4:07
4.	"Party Fear"	Anderson; Crowhurst	3:32
5.	"Worries"	Anderson; Crowhurst; Edwards; Daniel Hutchinson; Samuel Skirrow	2:45
6.	"STFU"	Anderson; Crowhurst; Skirrow	3:47
7.	"27 Club"	Anderson; Traynor	2:05
8.	"Sadboi"	Anderson; Crowhurst; Edwards; Edward Palmer	2:59
9.	"Shadow"	Anderson; Edwards; Crowhurst	3:29
10.	"Structure"	Anderson	1:44
11.	"Squares"	Anderson; Edwards; Crowhurst	3:49
12.	"Big & Scared"	Anderson; Edwards; Crowhurst	5:15
