= Origo (EP) =

EP by Natalia Nykiel
- Released: 15 November 2019
- Recorded: 2019
- Genre: Electronic, pop-rock, electropop
- Length: 18:41
- Language: English, Spanish, Polish
- Label: Universal Music Polska
- Producer: Michał „Fox” Król

Natalia Nykiel chronology
Discordia (2017)	''Origo'' (2019)

Singles from Origo
- 1. "Volcano" Released: 15 November 2019

Origo is the second extended play by Polish singer and songwriter Natalia Nykiel, released 15 November 2019 through Universal Music Polska.

== Track listing ==
No.	Title	Writer(s)	Producer(s)	Length
1.	"Quya"	Natalia Nykiel; Michał „Fox” Król; Alonso Alekian	Nykiel; „Fox” Król	4:03
2.	"Volcano"	Nykiel; „Fox” Król; Josh Farro; Hayley Williams	Nykiel; „Fox” Król	3:13
3.	"Find Me" (featuring Daley)	Nykiel; „Fox” Król; Daley	Nykiel; „Fox” Król; Daley	3:39
4.	"Wanna Go Back"	Nykiel; „Fox” Król; Stevie Aiello	Nykiel; „Fox” Król	3:37
5.	"I'm Not For You" (featuring Rodzinny Zespół Śpiewaczy z Rakowicz)	Nykiel; „Fox” Król; Andrzej Mrozek; Rodzinny Zespół Śpiewaczy z Rakowicz	Nykiel; „Fox” Król; Rodzinny Zespół Śpiewaczy z Rakowicz	4:06
Total length:				18:41

Sampling credits

- "Volcano" samples the song "Careful" by Paramore from their 2009 album Brand New Eyes.

== Charts ==
Chart (2019)	Peak position
Polish Albums (ZPAV)	12

== Release history ==
Country	Date	Format	Label	Ref.
Worldwide	15 November 2019	Digital download, streaming	Universal Music Polska	
Poland	15 November 2019	CD	Universal Music Polska	
Europe	12 June 2021	LP	Universal Music Polska	
