= Typesun =

English record producer, drummer, and DJ

- Born: Luke Harney
- Origin: Bristol, England
- Genres: Dance, soul, house
- Occupations: Producer, drummer, DJ
- Label: Root Elevation

Luke Harney, aka Typesun, is an English record producer, drummer, and DJ from Bristol, England.

== Singles ==
Typesun's track "Last Home" was used as the first track on Bristol Record Label Futureboogies compilation Futureboogie 10

Typesun released his single "Heart Maths", taken from his upcoming album Work Is Love Made Visible, in August 2012. "Heart Maths" was a collaboration with fellow Bristol musician Guido, the release also included a remix from Peverelist.

The release got 9/10 in Mixmag's Dubstep section in both the print mag and the online version.

== "The PL" ==
"The PL" was released 14 January 2013 with a remix from Behling & Simpson. The remix got 5/5 from DJ Magazine. ID Mag listed it as song of the day and This Is Fake DIY included it in The Neu Bulletin.

"The PL" got early support from BBC Introducing with them putting it onto the BBC Radio 1 playlist for a week in their Introducing spot. The track has been played by Sara Cox, Greg James, Dev, Scott Mills and Huw Stephens on Radio 1, Gilles Peterson on BBC 6 Music and MistaJam on 1XTRA.

== Remixes ==
Believe Recordings released a Typesun remix of Mina Tindle's track "Lovely Day" in March 2013.

== Live ==
Typesun performed two live launch shows in March 2013, one in London at The Portobello Flyover and the other in Bristol at The Exchange. The London show was listed in Time Out magazine in the "Take a chance under a tenner" section.
