= Stronger Than Ever (Raleigh Ritchie song) =

Single by Raleigh Ritchie

from the album You're a Man Now, Boy
- Released: 14 March 2014
- Recorded: 2013
- Genre: Alternative R&B
- Length: 3:51
- Label: Columbia Records
- Songwriter(s): Jacob Anderson; Chris Loco
- Producer(s): Chris Loco; Raleigh Ritchie

Raleigh Ritchie singles chronology
"The Middle Child" (2013)	"Stronger Than Ever" (2014)	"Cuckoo" (2014)

"Stronger Than Ever" is a song by British R&B singer and actor Raleigh Ritchie, released as the lead single from his debut album, You're a Man Now, Boy. The song is also included on his EP Black and Blue (2014). The MJ Cole remix was released as a single in the United Kingdom as a digital download on 14 March 2014 through Columbia Records. The song peaked at number 30 on the UK Singles Chart. British singer-songwriter Lily Allen covered the song in an acoustic version at the BBC Radio 1's Live Lounge.

== Music video ==
On 14 January 2014, a music video for the song directed by Ninian Doff was uploaded to VEVO and YouTube. The video shows Ritchie sitting on a park bench drinking coffee when a strong wind starts blowing which only affects him. The wind slowly gets stronger until it blows him off the bench. As of December 2020, the video has over 11.6 million views.

== Track listing ==
Digital download - EP version
No.	Title	Length
1.	"Stronger Than Ever"	3:51

Digital download - Single
No.	Title	Length
1.	"Stronger Than Ever" (MJ Cole Remix)	5:58

== Chart performance ==
Chart (2014)	Peak position
UK Singles (OCC)	30

== Release history ==
Region	Date	Format	Label
United Kingdom	14 March 2014	Digital download	Columbia Records

== Certifications ==
Region	Certification	Certified units/sales
United Kingdom (BPI)	Silver	200,000^{‡}
^{‡} Sales+streaming figures based on certification alone.
