= Daley (musician) =

British singer and artist

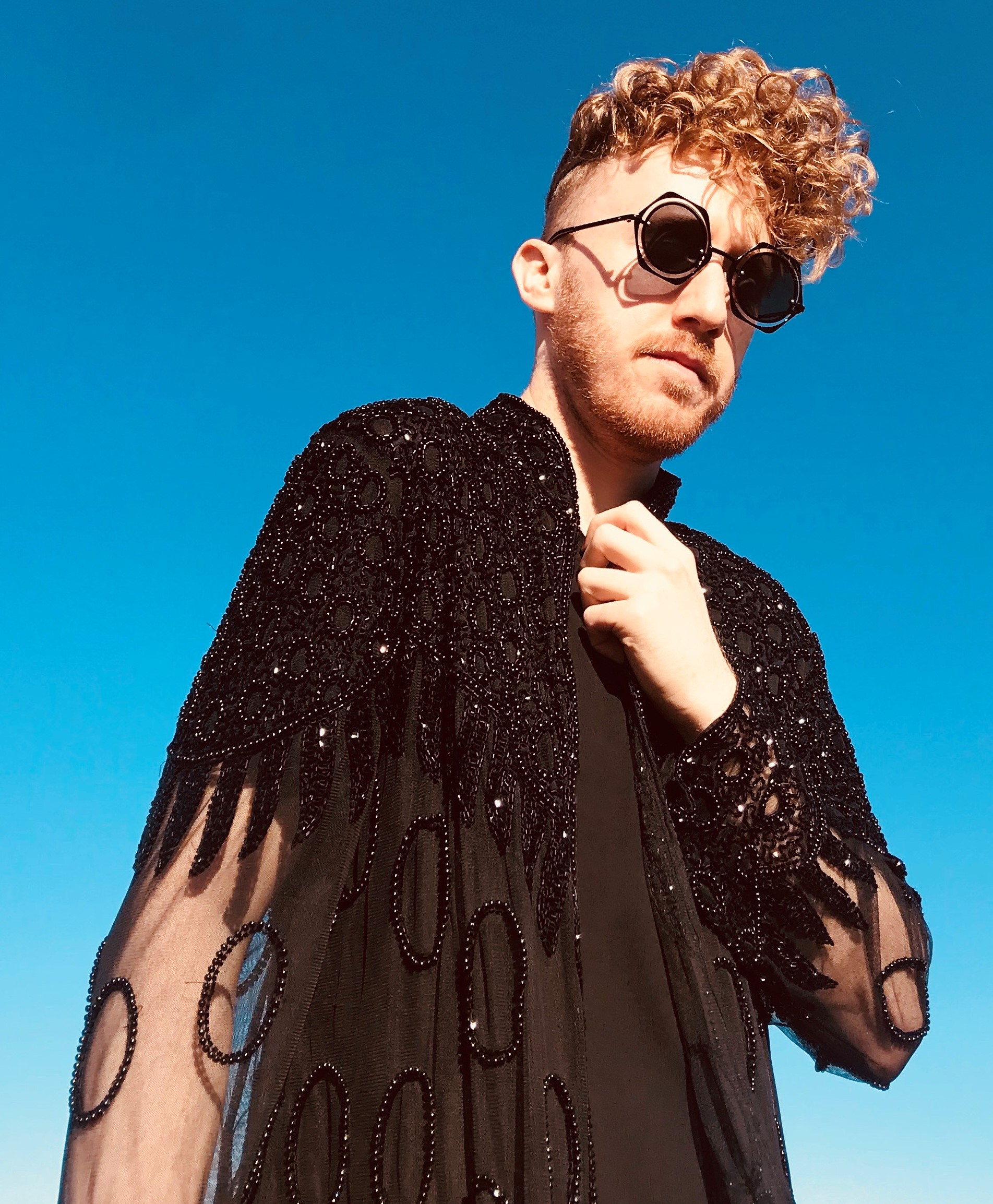
- Daley in 2015

Background information
- Born: Gareth Daley
- Genres: Alternative R&B, soul
- Occupations: Singer-songwriter, musician
- Instruments: Keyboards, piano, vocals
- Years active: 2010–present
- Labels: Republic, Polydor
- Website: daley.tv

Gareth Daley (/ˈdeɪˈli/), known mononymously as Daley, is a British singer-songwriter. After signing with Universal Music, Daley released the singles "Alone Together" with Marsha Ambrosius (of Floetry), the Pharrell Williams-produced "Look Up" and "Until the Pain Is Gone".

== Career ==
Daley released the independent download-only the mixtape Those Who Wait in 2011. His first album, Days + Nights was released on 11 February 2014 by Polydor Records in the United Kingdom and Republic Records in the United States. The album featured collaborations with Pharrell Williams, Illangelo, Bernard Butler and Shea Taylor. His second album, The Spectrum was released via BMG Rights Management. The album featured lead single "Until The Pain Is Gone".

== Discography ==
=== Albums ===
List of albums, with selected chart positions, sales figures and certifications
Title	Details	Peak positions		
Title	Details	US	US Heat	US R&B
Days + Nights	Released: 11 February 2014; Label: Polydor, Republic; Format: CD, digital download	128	1	12
The Spectrum	Released: 14 July 2017; Label: BMG; Format: CD, digital download	—	7	—
Strange Nature	Released: 18 September 2026; Label: TEXX7, SRG/ILS; Format: CD, digital download	—	—	—
"—" denotes albums that did not chart or were not released.

=== EPs ===
Title	Details	Chart positions
Title	Details	US Heat
Those Who Wait	Released: August 2011; Format: Free download	—
Alone Together	Released: 6 November 2012; Label: Republic; Formats: Digital download, CD	30
Songs That Remind Me of You	Released: 18 July 2013; Format: Free download	—
"—" denotes albums that did not chart or were not released.

=== Singles ===
Title	Year	Peak chart positions				Album
Title	Year	UK	US Adult R&B	US R&B/HH	US R&B/HH Airplay	Album
"Doncamatic" (Gorillaz featuring Daley)	2010	37	—	—	—	The Singles Collection 2001–2011
"Those Who Wait"	2011	—	—	—	—	Those Who Wait
"Alone Together" (featuring Marsha Ambrosius)	2012	—	5	66	31	Alone Together
"Remember Me" (featuring Jessie J)	2012	24	—	—	—	Alone Together
"Broken"	2013	—	—	—	—	Days + Nights
"Look Up"	2013	—	10	—	48	Days + Nights
"Time Travel"	2014	—	—	—	—	Days + Nights
"Until the Pain Is Gone" (featuring Jill Scott)	2017	—	5	—	41	The Spectrum
"—" denotes singles that were not officially released.

=== Appearances ===
Song	Year	Artist(s)	Album
"Doncamatic"	2010	Gorillaz featuring Daley	The Singles Collection 2001–2011
"Long Way Home"	2011	Wretch 32 featuring Daley	Black and White
"Heaven"	2013	Nelly featuring Daley	M.O.
"Birds & Bees"	2015	Vince Staples featuring Daley	Summertime '06
"Heaven"	2019	Dyllón Burnside featuring Daley	Heaven (Single)
"Find Me"	2019	Natalia Nykiel featuring Daley	Origo
