= Magdalena Wasylik =

Polish actress and singer (born 1995)

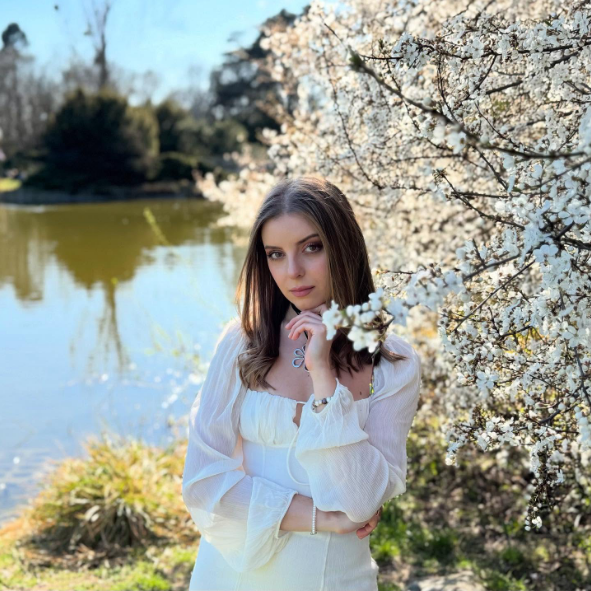
- Born: 31 August 1995 (age 30); Sieradz, Poland
- Occupations: Actress, singer

Magdalena Wasylik (born 31 August 1995 in Sieradz) is a Polish actress and singer.

She is known for her roles in Polish dubbing of Frozen, Oz the Great and Powerful and Despicable Me 2.

== Polish dubbing ==
=== Movies ===
- 2002: Cadet Kelly
- 2004: Pixel Perfect
- 2007: Enchanted
- 2009: Curious George: A Very Monkey Christmas
- 2009: Lilly the Witch: The Dragon and the Magic Book – Mona
- 2009: Princess Protection Program
- 2009: The Dog Who Saved Christmas – Kara Bannister
- 2010: The Dog Who Saved Christmas Vacation – Kara Bannister
- 2011: The Dog Who Saved Halloween – Kara Bannister
- 2012: ParaNorman – Agatha „Aggie” Prenderghast
- 2012: Rise of the Guardians
- 2012: Cat in the Hat Knows a Lot About Christmas – Fig the dolphin
- 2012: A Fairly Odd Christmas
- 2013: Oz the Great and Powerful – The girl on a wheelchair / China doll
- 2013: Despicable Me 2 – Margo
- 2013: Scooby-Doo! Stage Fright
  - Chrissy
  - 2015: Strawberry Shortcake - Słodkie Winogrona
- 2013: Frozen - Anna (singing)
- 2014: Transformers: Age of Extinction – Tessa Yeager
- 2014: My Little Pony: Equestria Girls – Rainbow Rocks - Adagio Dazzle
- 2014: Santa Hunters - Elizabeth
- 2016: Trolls - Poppy
- 2019: Kraina lodu 2 - Anna (singing)
- 2020: Trolls World Tour - Poppy
- 2021: Sing 2 - Meena
- 2023: Trolls Band Together - Poppy
- 2024: Madame Web - Anya Corazon

=== Seriale ===
- 1992: Barney & Friends
  - Sarah (episodes 142, 144, 150),
  - Beth (episode 145)
- 2000: Dora the Explorer – Dora
- 2004-2014: LazyTown – Stephanie
- 2004: Peppa Pig – Peppa Pig (TVP dubbing)
- 2011: Kickin' It – Lindsay (episode 44)
- 2011: Jessie – Ally Dawson (episode 33)
- 2011: Austin & Ally – Ally Dawson
- 2012: Care Bears: Welcome to Care-a-Lot
  - Phoebe (episode 4)
  - Kaja (episode 24)
- 2012: Violetta – Natalia "Naty" Vidal

=== Video games ===
- 2011: The Witcher 2: Assassins of Kings

=== Songs ===
- 1999: SpongeBob SquarePants – opening song
- 2010: Strawberry Shortcake's Berry Bitty Adventures – opening song (episodes 27–52)
- 2014: Steven Universe - "Kochać jak Ty" (Love like you) – ending song
- 2013: Kraina lodu - "Ulepimy dziś bałwana" (Do You Want to Build a Snowman), "Pierwszy raz jak sięga pamięć" + reprise (For the First Time in Forever), "Miłość stanęła w drzwiach" ("Love Is an Open Door")
- 2019: Kraina lodu 2 - "To niezmienne jest" (Some Things Never Change), "Już ty wiesz co" (The Next Right Thing)

== Educational songs for children ==
- 2013: Piosenkowe zabawy dla dzieci Publishing house "Harmonia"
- 2013: Bawię się, uczę i śpiewam Publishing house "Harmonia"
- 2013: Piosenki o Bożym Narodzeniu i zimie Publishing house "Harmonia"
- 2014: Śpiewasz ty i śpiewam ja! Publishing house "Harmonia"
- 2014: Śpiew i zabawa z Marią Konopnicką Publishing house "Harmonia"
