= Beata Jankowska-Tzimas =

Polish singer and actress (born 1970)

Beata Jankowska-Tzimas (born 1 May 1970 in Gołdap) is a Polish singer and actress. In 2013, she became a contestant on The Voice of Poland.

== Polish dubbing ==
- 2008:The Secret Saturdays – Drew Saturday
- 2008:The Little Mermaid: Ariel's Beginning- Ariel
- 2005:Dive, Olly Dive!- Olly
- 2005–2008:Ben 10--
  - Pinky (odc. 29)
  - Kai (odc. 31)
- 2005:The New House- Koko
- 2005:Barbie and the Magic of Pegasus- Troll / Wife No. 3
- 2004:The Backyardigans- Pablo
- 2004:The Terminal
- 2004:Transformers: War of Energon- Mika
- 2003:Little Robots- Tiny
- 2003:Children with Ms. Solar Valley
- 2003–2005:The Teen Titans- Terra
- 2003:The Jungle Book 2
- 2000:Rugrats in the Paris
- 2000:The Little Mermaid 2: Return to the Sea- Ariel
- 1998–2004:The Powerpuff Girls- Blossom
- 1998:Prince of Egypt- Miriam
- 1998:Rudolph the Red-Nosed Reindeer- Morning Star (voice)
- 1997–1998:Saban's Adventures of Oliver Twist
- 1996:Little Mouse on the Prairie- Spryciulka
- 1997:World of Peter Rabbit and His Friends- Singing songs
- 1996:The Why Why Family- Kwik
- 1994:Tonde Burin
- 1994:Swan Princess (TV version)- Odette
- 1990:Pinocchio
- 1989:Little Mermaid- Ariel
- 1987:Yogi Bear and the Magical Flight of the Spruce Goose- Singing songs
- 1984–1991:Muppet Babies- Skeeter
- 1983–1987:Fraglesy
- 1983:Donald Duck presents
- 1960–1966:The Flintstones

Films series, and Scooby-Doo – as Daphne

- 2007:Chill Out, Scooby-Doo!
- 2005:Scooby-Doo on the trail Mumii
- 2005:Aloha, Scooby-Doo!
- 2004:Scooby-Doo! and the Loch Ness Monster
- 2003:Scooby-Doo and Mexican monster
- 2003:Scooby-Doo and the Legend Wampira
- 2001:Scooby-Doo and Cyber Chase
- 2000:Scooby-Doo and
- 1999:Scooby-Doo and the Spirit of magicians
- 1998:Scooby-Doo on Zombie Island
- 1979:Scooby-Doo conquer Hollywood
- 2006:Kudłaty and Scooby-Doo to the trail
- 2002–2005:What's new in Scooby'ego ?
- 1988–1991:A Pup Named Scooby-Doo
- 1985:13 demons Scooby-Doo
- 1979–1984:Scooby-Doo and Scrappy
- 1976–1978:Scooby-Doo
- 1972–1973:New Scooby-Doo
- 1969–1970:Scooby-Doo, Where Are You!
