= List of Old Oakhamians =

Alumni of Oakham School are known as Old Oakhamians.

Oakham School is a British co-educational independent school in the market town of Oakham in Rutland, with a school roll of about 1,000 pupils, aged from 10 to 18. The school was founded in 1584 by archdeacon Robert Johnson, along with Uppingham School, a few miles away.

Notable former pupils include:

== Academics ==
- Joseph George Cumming, geologist and archaeologist, professor of classical literature and geology
- Horace Donisthorpe, entomologist, myrmecologist and coleopterist
- Peter North, principal of Jesus College and Vice-Chancellor of Oxford
- John Henry Pratt, mathematician
- Sir Michael Stoker, virologist and cancer biologist

== Armed forces ==
- Rear Admiral Philip Wilcocks

== Ecclesiastics ==
- James Atlay, 98th Bishop of Hereford
- John Godfrey FitzMaurice Day, Bishop of Ossory, Ferns and Leighlin (1920-1938); Archbishop of Armagh (1938)
- Francis ffolkes, 5th Baronet, Chaplain-in-Ordinary to King George V (1910–1936)
- Leonard Hawkes, Archdeacon of Lindisfarne
- John Henley, clergyman, commonly known as 'Orator Henley'
- Thomas Merton, writer and Trappist monk

== Politics, the Colonial Service and the law ==
- Anthony Clarke, Baron Clarke of Stone-cum-Ebony, Justice of the Supreme Court of the United Kingdom
- Lord Cope of Berkeley, Conservative Member of Parliament for South Gloucestershire 1974-1983; Northavon 1983-1997; during this time he was Paymaster General 1992-1994
- Paul Filing, Australian politician (Member of the House of Representatives for Moore, Western Australia)
- William Allmond Codrington Goode GCMG, last Governor of Singapore 1957-1959; last Governor of North Borneo 1959-1963
- William George "Bill" O'Chee, Australian politician (Senator for Queensland)
- Kate Harrisson, British Ambassador to Peru (2018–present)
- Muhammad V, Sultan of Kelantan and Yang di-Pertuan Agong 2016-2019

== Arts ==
- Annabelle Apsion, actress
- Charlie Bewley, actor
- Lydia Rose Bewley, actor
- Henry Camamile, Rory Young, Andrew Dawson, and Oli Khan of Sea Girls, indie rock band from London
- Katie Hall, actress and soprano
- Andy Harries, UK producer, Left Bank Pictures
- Greg Hicks, actor
- Richard Hope, actor
- Richard Hurst, writer and director
- Daniel Hyde, organist and conductor
- Miles Jupp, actor, comedian
- Jason Kay, singer (Jamiroquai)
- Matthew Macfadyen, actor
- Matthew Manning, psychic
- China Miéville, novelist
- Katie Mitchell, theatre director
- Alexander Newley, painter
- Alfred Young Nutt, Victorian artist and architect
- Malcolm Rogers, director of the Museum of Fine Arts, Boston, Massachusetts
- Kwame Ryan, conductor and musician
- Janek Schaefer, sound artist, British Composer of the Year in Sonic Art
- Indra Sinha, novelist
- Tom Wiggall, composer

== Broadcasting and media ==
- Tom Heap, BBC News rural affairs correspondent (formerly BBC News's science and environment correspondent)
- Charlotte Uhlenbroek, biologist and broadcaster

== Sport ==
- Charlie Beech, professional rugby union player with Bath Rugby and England U19s
- Matthew Boyce, cricketer (Leicestershire)
- Roderick Bradley, player of American football
- J.W.M. Bradshaw, cricketer (Leicestershire)
- Stuart Broad, England international cricketer and England T20 captain
- Alex Brundle, professional racing driver
- Percy Chapman, England cricketer (captain)
- Josh Cobb, cricketer (Leicestershire)
- Rob Cook, rugby union player for Gloucester Rugby
- Sam Costelow, rugby union player for the Scarlets and Wales
- Tom Croft, British and Irish Lions and England player
- Crista Cullen, England and Great Britain field hockey player
- Arthur Cursham, England footballer and county cricketer (Nottinghamshire and Derbyshire)
- John Furley, cricketer
- Alex Goode, rugby union player for Saracens RFC and England Saxons
- Ron Jacobs, rugby union player, England International and captain
- Lyndon James, cricketer
- Frank Jerwood, Olympic oarsman
- Joseph Kendall, cricketer
- Alex Martin, cricketer
- Bhargav Modha, cricketer
- Lewis Moody, British and Irish Lions, England Rugby, Leicester Tigers and Bath Rugby rugby union player; England captain
- Lucy Pearson, England women's cricket captain
- Jack van Poortvliet, rugby union player for Leicester Tigers and England
- Matt Smith, rugby union player, England Saxons
- James Alexander Simpson Taylor, cricketer (Leicestershire and Scotland)
- Hamish Watson, rugby union player for Edinburgh and Scotland
- Alex Wyatt, cricketer (Leicestershire)
- Tom Fell, cricketer

== Others ==
- John Jerwood, founder of the Jerwood Foundation
- Richard Profit, polar explorer
