= Jerwood =

Jerwood is a surname. Notable people with the surname include:

- Colin Jerwood, the vocalist for the Anarcho-punk band Conflict
- Frank Jerwood (1885–1971), British rower who competed in the 1908 Summer Olympics
- John Jerwood (1918–1991), British philanthropist who funded the Jerwood Foundation
- Nia Jerwood (born 1998), Welsh-born Australian competitive sailor

== See also ==
- Jerwood Award, financial award made to assist new writers of non-fiction in the UK
- Jerwood Drawing Prize, United Kingdom award in contemporary drawing
- Jerwood Foundation, major UK funder of arts, education and science
- Jerwood Foundation's sculpture collection, Sculpture park
- Jerwood Sculpture Prize
- Jerwood Space, arts venue at Bankside on Union Street, Southwark, London
