= Jerwood Prize =

Jerwood Prize may refer to:

- the Jerwood Applied Arts Prize, awarded by the Jerwood Foundation
- the Jerwood Drawing Prize
- the Jerwood Fiction Uncovered Prize
- the Jerwood Painting Prize
- the Jerwood Sculpture Prize
- the Jerwood Prize for Non-fiction or Jerwood Award
- the Jerwood Prize for Traditional Arts, awarded to a student at the Prince's School of Traditional Arts in London
- the Jerwood/Photoworks Awards, awarded by the Jerwood Charitable Foundation and Photoworks, for photography
