= John Jerwood =

English businessman and philanthropist (1918–1991)

John Michael Jerwood MC (17 September 1918 – 23 June 1991) was an English businessman and philanthropist.

John Jerwood was born in 1918, some six months after his father, Major John Hugh Jerwood MC, was killed in action. His mother Cecilia Mary Herklots (née Powles) married Arthur Wellesley L'Estrange Fawcett in 1920. Like his father, he was educated at Oakham School where his uncle Frank Jerwood was now chaplain. In 1935 he entered an uncle's pearl and precious stones business in London.

He was commissioned in the King's Own Yorkshire Light Infantry in 1940 and was awarded the Military Cross in 1944 while serving with the 1st battalion in Italy. After the war he transferred to the Royal Auxiliary Air Force as a flight lieutenant and relinquished his commission in 1958.

After the war he moved to Japan where he made a fortune dealing in cultured pearls. With his lawyer and friend, Alan Grieve, he considered how he could use his money for charitable purposes. The Jerwood Foundation was set up in 1977, at first to provide generous benefactions to his old school, Oakham, and prizes and bursaries for young artists and musicians. Oakham School appointed him its Visitor in gratitude and has named its junior department Jerwoods and is home to the Jerwood School of Design. After Jerwood's unexpected death in 1991, Grieve took over the running of the foundation. The Jerwood Foundation and the Jerwood Charitable Foundation are significant patrons of the arts and the Jerwood name has been given to many projects that they have funded.

In 1950 he married Sugiko Kawaii; they had no children.

== See also ==
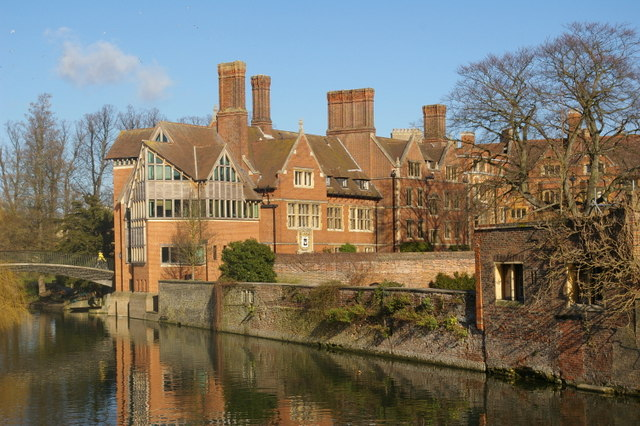
The Jerwood Library at Trinity Hall, Cambridge, was opened in 1999

- Jerwood Award, financial award made to assist new writers of non-fiction
- Jerwood Drawing Prize, award in contemporary drawing
- Jerwood Fiction Uncovered Prize
- Jerwood Foundation, major funder of arts, education and science
- Jerwood Foundation's sculpture collection
- Jerwood Painting Prize
- Jerwood Sculpture Prize
- Jerwood Space, arts venue at Bankside on Union Street, Southwark, London
