= Katie Pratt =

English artist

Katie Pratt is an artist and abstract painter living and working in London. Born in Epsom, UK, 23 May 1969, she is most recognised for large paintings with heavy volumes of oil paint that combine geometric and organic detail in diagrammatic complex systems. She won the Jerwood Painting Prize in 2001.

== Education ==
- MA (RCA) Painting Royal College of Art 1996–1998
- BA (Hons) Fine Art (Painting) Winchester School of Art 1989–1992
- Foundation in Art & Design at Central School of Art & Design 1987–1988
- Wallington High School for Girls 1985–1987
- St Helen's School 1980–1985

== Exhibitions ==
- 2017: The Order of Things Co-curator (with Andrew Bick and Jonathan Parsons) and Exhibitor, 28 January 2017– 2 March 2017: at The Wilson (Cheltenham)
- 2016: Upsom Downs Galerie Peter Zimmermann Mannheim, Germany
- 2015: Revisiting the Jerwood Painting Prize Jerwood Gallery, Hastings
- 2006: Jonathan Lasker, Patrick Heron, Katie PrattJohn Hansard Gallery, University of Southampton curated by Prof. Stephen Foster 14 February to 8 April 2006
- 2005: Landscape Confection, curated by Helen Molesworth Wexner Center for the Arts 29 January −1 May 2005 Contemporary Arts Museum Houston 23 July – 11 September 2005 & Orange County Museum of Art 6 February- 7 May 2006
- 2003: New British Painting: Part 1 John Hansard Gallery, University of Southampton 2 December 2003 – 31 January 2004
- 1999: New Contemporaries99
