= Krut (surname) =

Krut is a Russian language surname. Notable people with the name include:

- Ansel Krut (1959), South African painter
- David Krut, South African publisher
