= Roy Oxlade =

English painter

- Born: 13 January 1929; Tottenham, England
- Died: 15 February 2014 (aged 85); Kent, England
- Education: Bromley School of Art; Goldsmiths; Royal College of Art
- Occupation: Painter

Roy Oxlade (13 January 1929 – 15 February 2014) was an English painter, writer on art, and an art educator.

== Life and education ==
Green Painting, 2007

Roy Oxlade was born on 13 January 1929 in Tottenham, England to Emily and William Oxlade.

Oxlade went to the Bromley School of Art and Goldsmiths, London, and was a student of David Bomberg for two years at the Borough Polytechnic.

While studying at Goldsmiths, Oxlade met the painter, Rose Wylie, a fellow student, and they married in 1957. They had three children together: Luke-John, Elizabeth, and Henrietta.

Oxlade received his PhD from the Royal College of Art. His PhD thesis was on David Bomberg and titled, Bomberg and the Borough: An Approach to Drawing.

== Career ==
In 1961 to 1962 Mr Oxlade was an art teacher at Argyle Secondary High School in North Vancouver.

Sisters Bath, 199

In 1968, Oxlade was appointed as Head of Art at Sittingbourne College of Education. Accordingly, him and Wylie moved to Newnham, Kent.

=== Posthumous exhibitions ===
Roy Oxlade: Work from the 80s & 90s (2018), the first solo exhibition of Oxlade's work since his death, received critical acclaim and coverage in numerous publications including Frieze, ArtLyst and Mousse.

In 2019, it was announced that Oxlade would be the subject of the inaugural exhibition at Hastings Contemporary.

== Work ==
Number 13 Book 18, 1999

Oxlade usually painted using oil on canvas. Believing pure abstraction to be limited, his paintings feature a mix of abstract forms and other representational elements including " some characters, some actors – tables, pots, colours, easels, lamps, scribbles, figures and faces to interact with each other".

Oxlade also wrote several essays.

== Bibliography ==
- Oxlade (1977). David Bomberg 1890-1957. Patronage and Teaching 1913-1945; The Approach to Painting. London: Royal College of Art. ISBN 0902490230.
- Oxlade (2010). Art and Instinct: Selected Writings of Roy Oxlade. Edited by Marcus Reichert. London: Ziggurat Books. ISBN 9780956657909.

== Essays ==
- Oxlade (2008). "'Good' Draughtsmanship or Real Drawing". Art without Art: Selected Writing from the World of Blunt Edge. Edited by Marcus Reichert. London: Ziggurat Books. pp. 16–20. ISBN 9780954665661.
- Oxlade (2008). "Vitamin D: For Drawing". Art without Art: Selected Writing from the World of Blunt Edge. Edited by Marcus Reichert. London: Ziggurat Books. pp. 29–31. ISBN 9780954665661.
- Oxlade (2008). "David Bomberg: The Climate Is Changing". Art without Art: Selected Writing from the World of Blunt Edge. Edited by Marcus Reichert. London: Ziggurat Books. pp. 38–45. ISBN 9780954665661.
- Oxlade (2008). "A Fear of Transcendence". Art without Art: Selected Writing from the World of Blunt Edge. Edited by Marcus Reichert. London: Ziggurat Books. pp. 49–55. ISBN 9780954665661.
- Oxlade (2008). "A Primitive Reformation". Art without Art: Selected Writing from the World of Blunt Edge. Edited by Marcus Reichert. London: Ziggurat Books. pp. 61–65. ISBN 9780954665661.
- Oxlade (2008). "Guston & Eliot". Art without Art: Selected Writing from the World of Blunt Edge. Edited by Marcus Reichert. London: Ziggurat Books. pp. 89–91. ISBN 9780954665661.
- Oxlade (2008). "Trust Me, I'm a Curator". Art without Art: Selected Writing from the World of Blunt Edge. Edited by Marcus Reichert. London: Ziggurat Books. pp. 104–107. ISBN 9780954665661.

== General references ==
- Michael Gaca (2002). "Exhibition List". Belgrave St Ives Gallery. Archived from the original on 13 March 2014.
