= Isabel Abraham Ross =

British teacher, suffragist and pacifist (1885–1964)

- Born: 22 August 1885; Garston, Liverpool, Lancashire, England
- Died: 29 October 1964 (aged 79); Poole, Dorset, England
- Occupations: teacher, suffragist and pacifist
- Employer: Wallington High School for Girls
- Organization(s): Women's Social and Political Union, East Africa Women’s League, Women's International League for Peace and Freedom
- Children: 2

Isabel McGregor Ross (née Abraham, 22 August 1885 – 29 October 1964) was a British teacher, suffragist, pacifist and biographer. She campaigned in England and Kenya.

== Early life ==
Ross was born Isabel Abraham in Garston, Liverpool, Lancashire in 1885. Ross was from a Quaker family. Her father was Thomas Fell Abraham, a pharmaceutical chemist who was descended from the founder of the Religious Society of Friends, Margaret Fell. Later in life, Ross wrote a biography of her ancestor, titled Margaret Fell: Mother of Quakerism. Ross' mother was her father's first wife, Margaret Sarah Abraham (née Brown).

== Education and early activism ==
Ross studied history at the University of Manchester, where she founded the university women's suffrage society. She was also a member of the Women's Social Political Union (WSPU). After graduating from university in 1908, Ross worked as a history teacher at Wallington High School for Girls. She lived whilst teaching with Nellie Ross, who would become her sister-in-law.

== Marriage and life in British East Africa ==
In 1915, she married William McGregor Ross (1876–1940), a civil engineer. They moved to Nairobi in British East Africa in 1917. They had two sons who were born in Africa.

In Kenya, Ross continued to pursue her interest in women's suffrage. After calling for a public meeting at the New Stanley Hotel alongside Blanche Massiah Schill, Ross became the founder and inaugural president of the East Africa Women's League (EAWL) on 14 March 1917. The organisation was open to white women only.

Ross said of the suffrage campaign that:

"Though at present the League's primary work would be to press for a vote here, it would not, I hope, die when it has won it. We women realize fully that the vote is but a means to an end and when we have the vote, then our public constructive work will have a chance of growing."

As president, she organised public campaign meetings and coordinated a petition asking for votes to be granted to European women, which was submitted on 24 February 1919. White European settler women were granted the right to vote in 1919. The EAWL then changed their mission, to "study and take action on, where necessary, all matters affecting the welfare and happiness of women and children of all races in East Africa." The EAWL's Library began under Ross' presidency. She was president until 1920 and was succeeded by Lady Macmillan.

Ross spoke to the Women's Group of the Ethical Movement on the subject of "the Colour Bar in London." She was also a member of the Education Board of Kenya and played an influential part in Nairobi social life.

== Return to England ==
Ross and her family returned to England in 1922. In 1924, she gave evidence to the divorce law committee, which drew up a Parliamentary Bill. In 1926, she advocated for a broader definition of slavery, which would include exploitative labour for private companies to tackle East African forced labour on plantations, and encouraged women to use their electoral votes to influence British Colonial Office policy.

In 1933, Isabel was appointed vice-chair of the British branch of the Women's International League for Peace and Freedom (WILPF). In 1941, then president of the EAWL, Lady Baden-Powell, invited Ross to become an honorary member of the organisation. Ross visited Kenya in 1949 and spoke at an EAWL conference.

== Death ==
She died in 1964 in Poole, Dorset, England.
