= Anna Mazzotta =

British visual artist

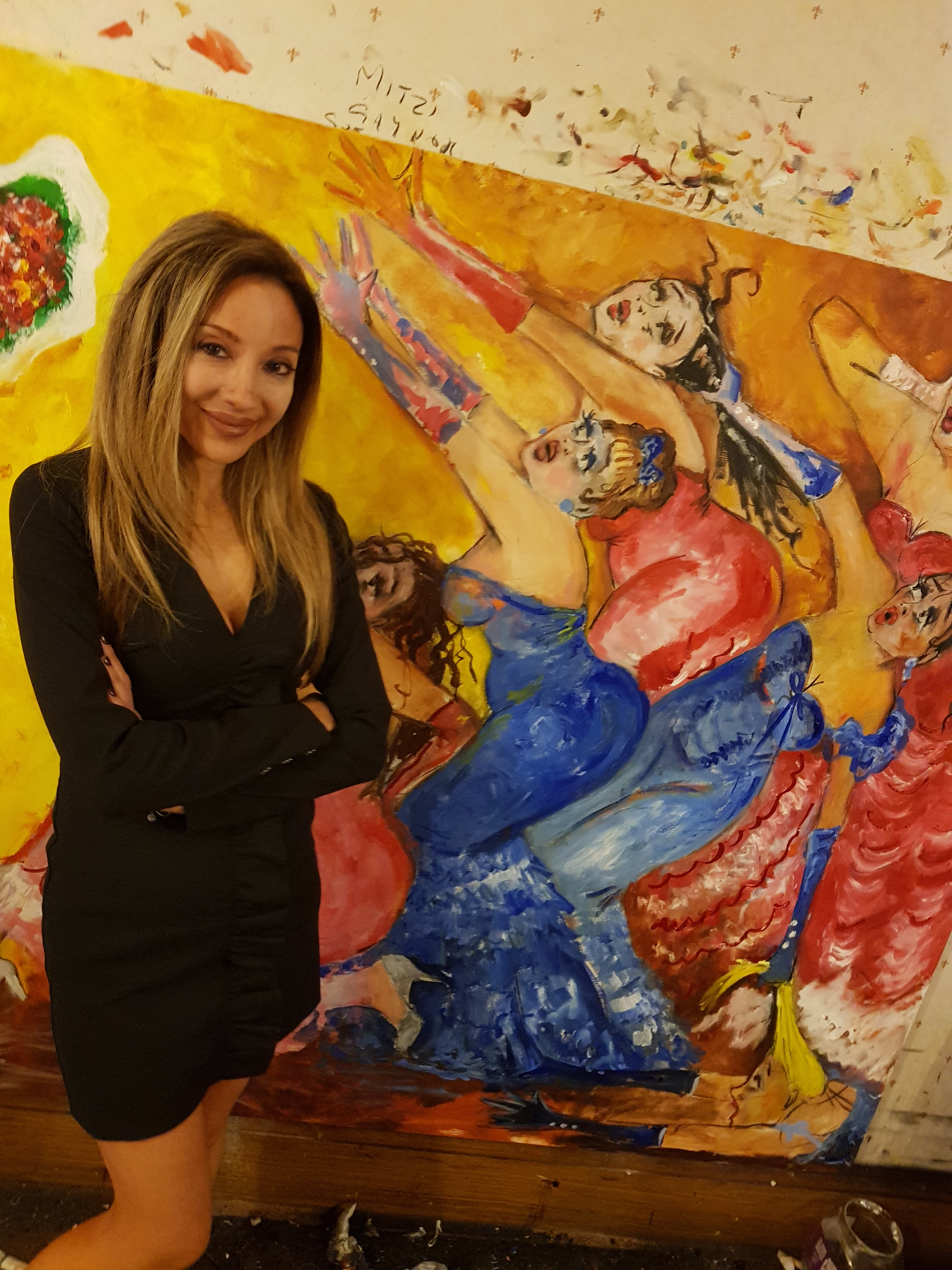
- Born: Swindon, England
- Education: Wimbledon College of Arts; Royal College of Art
- Known for: Oil Paintings, Charcoal Drawings

Anna Mazzotta is a British visual artist of Italian descent. She is best known for her paintings and charcoal drawings, based on observations of life, revivalist glamour underpinned by humour which is often bittersweet.

== Early life and education ==
Mazzotta was born in Swindon, Wiltshire. She studied Fine Art at the Wimbledon College of Arts, where she gained a First Class Honours Degree and afterwards, earned her Masters at the Royal College of Art under the tutelage of Paula Rego, John Bellany and Ken Kiff. Her work was included in the exhibition Five RCA Painters at the Paton Gallery.

== Career ==
Critics note that her art has a depth of narrative that makes her work unique with a distinctive style that is instantly recognisable. Mazzotta's style imitates vaudeville entertainment. Her work has been inspired by expressionism, the city of Weimar, and cinema. She lives and works in Bristol and London, England.

Mazzotta's solo exhibitions have been at Beaux Art in Bath, Gallery 19 in London, GX Gallery in London, Innocent Fine Art in Bristol, and A&D Gallery in London. She has done private commissions for Jane Fonda and Norman Cook.

== Honours and awards ==
- Jerwood Drawing Prize: Major Award Winner
- Society of Women Artists: Great Art Winner
- Susan Kasan Summer Fellowship, USA
