= Wallington High School for Girls =

Location
- Woodcote Road; Wallington, Greater London, SM6 0PH; United Kingdom; 51.348°N 0.1488°W

Information
- Type: Grammar school; Academy
- Motto: Heirs of the past, Makers of the future
- Established: 1888; 138 years ago
- Department for Education URN: 136789 Tables
- Ofsted: Reports
- Chair of the Governors: A Myerscough
- Head teacher: Tracy O’Brien
- Gender: Girls
- Age: 11 to 18
- Enrolment: 1500+
- Houses: Athena, Bronte, Curie, Johnson, Pankhurst, Seacole, Sharman
- Colours: Blue,Orange, Pink ,Red,Yellow, Green,Purple
- Website: http://www.wallingtongirls.sutton.sch.uk/

Wallington High School for Girls is an all-girls selective grammar school in the London Borough of Sutton, England.

== Admissions ==
It is a grammar school, with Tracey O'Brien as the Headmaster since September 2023.

The school is in Woodcote Green on the A237, around a half-mile north of the A2022 crossroads, at the junction of Sandy Lane South, Woodmansterne Lane, and Woodcote Road (A237). It is near the southern edge of the borough of Sutton, and the western edge of Croydon. It is only one mile north-east of Surrey, specifically Woodmansterne.

== History ==
Wallington High School for Girls was established in 1888 by a collective of nuns. The school building has since changed many times, and now accommodates an estimated 2310 students with 210 in each year group, as well as a Sixth Form College.

It was originally on Stanley Park Road in Carshalton, known as Wallington County Grammar School for Girls, the Wallington County School for Girls, Wallington County School, or the County School for Girls, Wallington. This site is now Woodfield primary school.

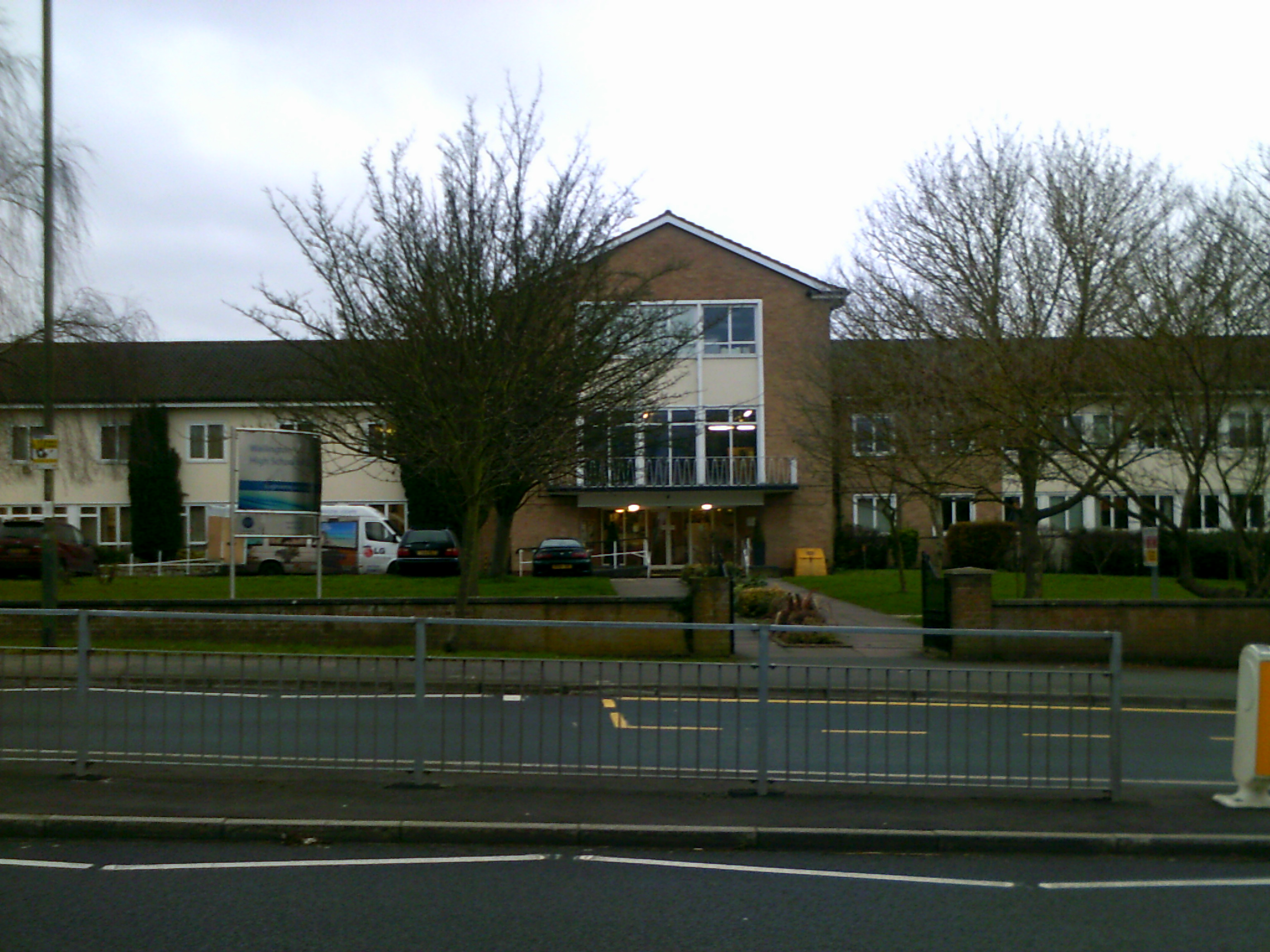
Wallington High School for Girls

It moved to Woodcote Road in 1965, the same year it changed its administration from Surrey County Council to the borough of Sutton. In the late 1970s it had around 750 girls with 150 in the sixth form. In the 1990s it became a grant-maintained school.

=== Headteachers ===
- Agnes Mark (1928–2005) from 1964 to 1980, later Head of Croydon High School from 1980 to 1990
- Amy Bull CBE (1902–1982) from 1937 to 1964, President from 1960 to 1962 of the Association of Headmistresses
- Dr Dorothy Atkinson
- Miss Margaret Edwards
- Barbara Greatorex BSc
- Jane Burton BSc
- Richard Booth
- Tracey O'Brien

=== Faculty ===
- Isabel Abraham Ross

== Church ==
The school lies in the parish of Wallington Holy Trinity, with the nearest church being Wallington St Patrick, and lies on the boundary with Roundshaw.

== Notable former pupils ==
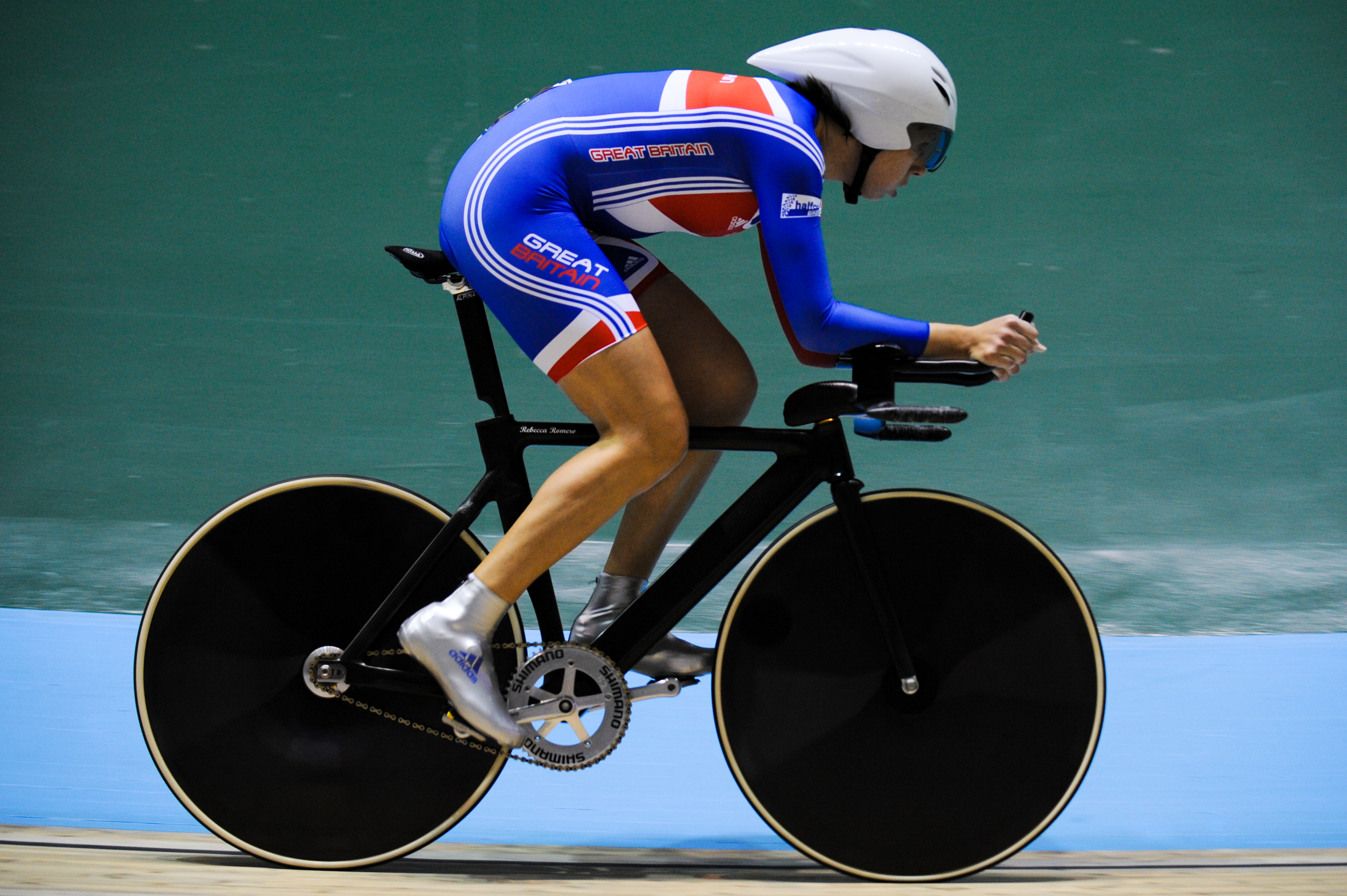
Rebecca Romero at the 2008 Olympics

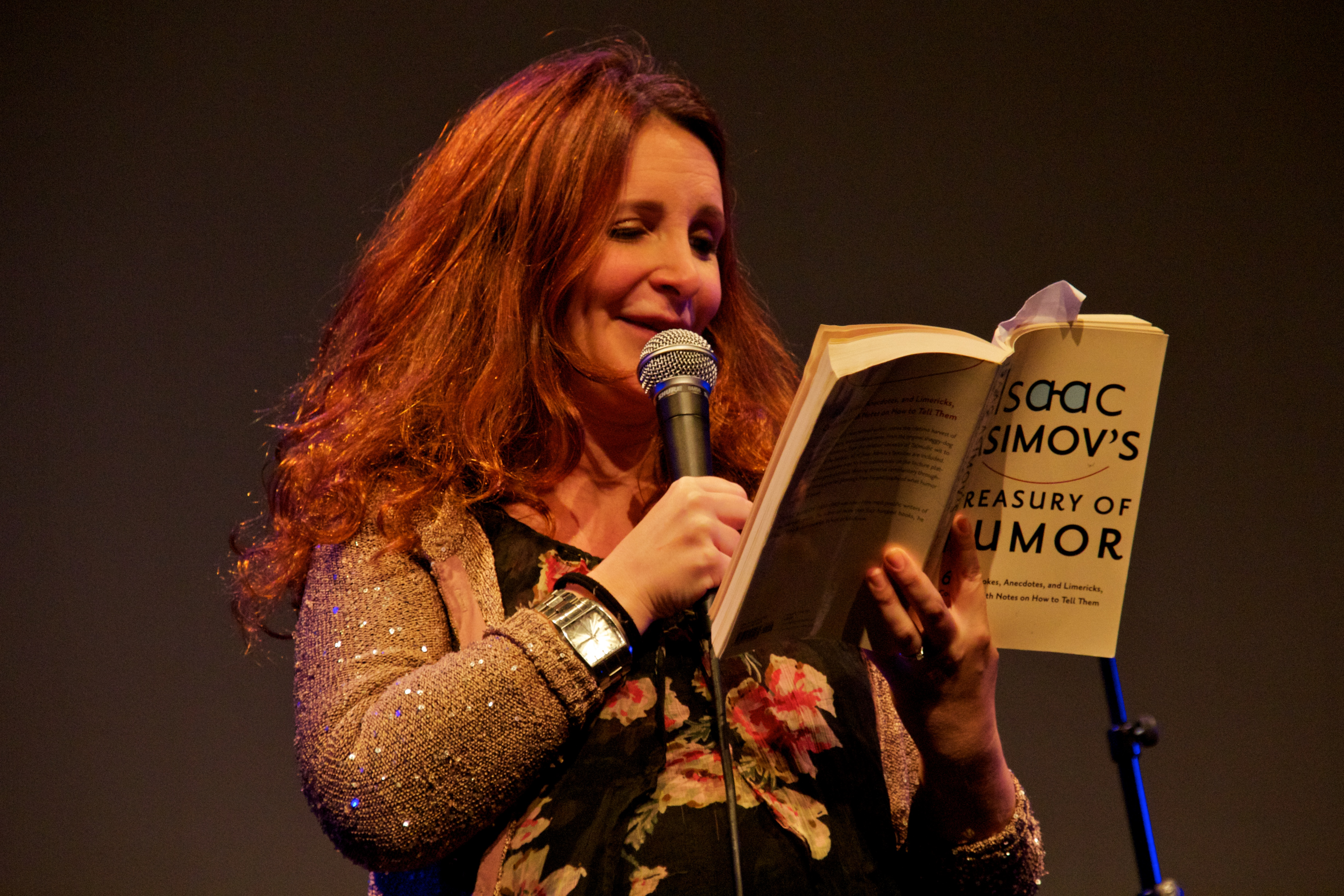
Lucy Porter in November 2011 at the Bright Club

- A. L. Barker, author
- Emily Benn, the Labour Party's youngest ever parliamentary candidate
- Deborah Bosley, travel writer, partner of Richard Ingrams in the 1990s
- Pauline Boty, artist and actress, 1938–66.
- Karen Bridge, badminton player, competed at the 1978 Commonwealth Games
- Marjorie Doggett (1921–2010), Singaporean animal rights advocate, architectural photographer and heritage conservationist.
- Linda Lennon (nee Smith) CBE, Chief Executive since 2015 of the London Stadium, from 2012 to 2015 of The Royal Parks, and from 2009 to 2012 of the Parole Board for England and Wales
- Shelley Newman (nee Drew), discus thrower, won bronze at the 2002 Manchester Commonwealth Games
- Lucy Porter, comedian, attended the school from 1984 to 1991
- Katie Pratt, artist
- Rebecca Romero MBE, rower and cyclist, silver medal winner in the quadruple sculls at the 2004 Summer Olympics, and gold medal winner in the individual pursuit at the 2008 Olympics, who attended from 1991 to 1998
- Isabel Abraham Ross, British teacher, suffragist and pacifist
- Ruth L. Saw, Professor of Aesthetics from 1961 to 1964 at Birkbeck College, and President from 1969 to 1970 of the British Society of Aesthetics, and from 1965 to 1966 of the Aristotelian Society
- Prof. Margaret Scott-Wright, Professor of Nursing Studies from 1972 to 1976 at the University of Edinburgh – the UK's first professor of nursing
- Joanna Taylor, actress who played Geri Hudson in Hollyoaks in the late 1990s, now married to footballer Danny Murphy
