= Rose Wylie =

British painter (born 1934)

Rose Wylie OBE RA
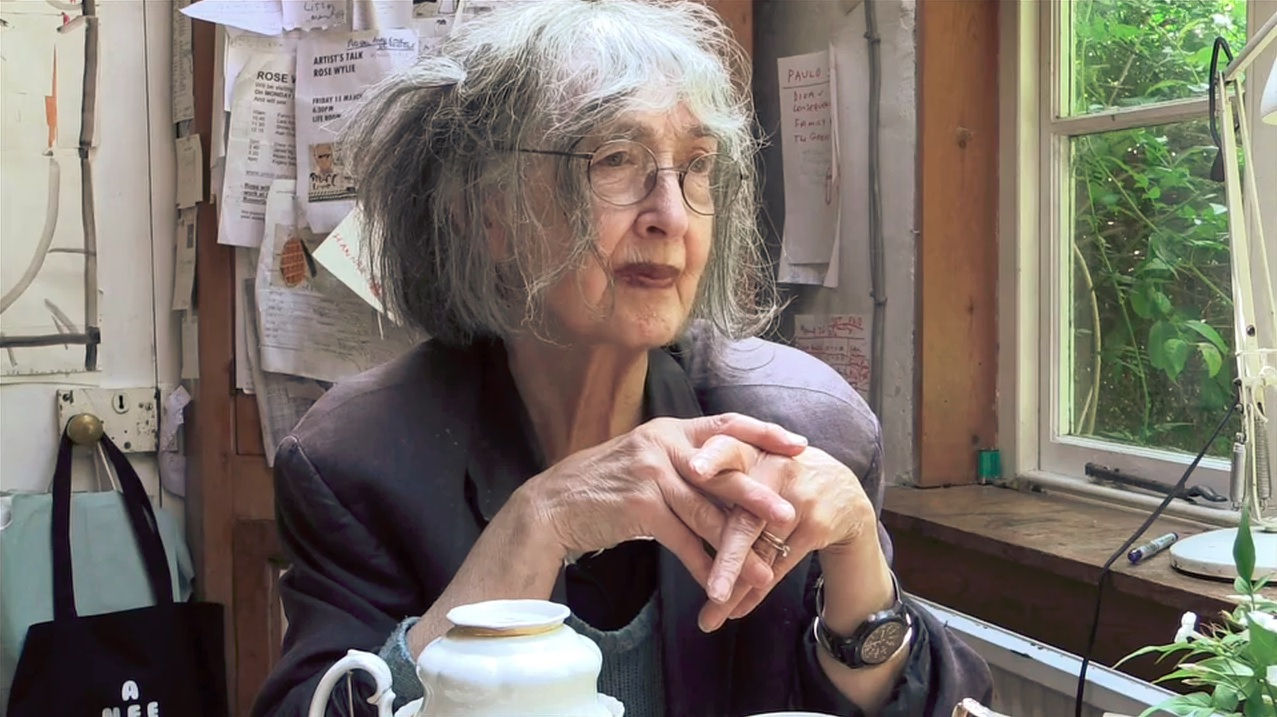
- Rose Wylie in her studio, 2014
- Born: 14 October 1934 (age 91); Hythe, Kent, England
- Education: Folkestone and Dover School of Art; Goldsmiths; Royal College of Art
- Known for: Painting
- Spouse: Roy Oxlade (1957 - 2014)
- Awards: Paul Hamlyn Prize (2011); John Moores Painting Prize (2014); Charles Wollaston Award (2015)
- Elected: Royal Academician (2014)

Rose Wylie OBE RA (born 14 October 1934) is a British painter. She is known for creating large paintings on unprimed canvas.

== Early life and education ==
Wylie was born on 14 October 1934 in Hythe in Kent She was the seventh child. Her father was a civil engineer, who had served as the director of ordnance in India. Whilst he did so, Wylie and her family lived in India with him.

Encouraged by her mother to enrol, from 1952 to 1956, Wylie studied at the Folkestone and Dover School of Art.

Whilst studying, Wylie regularly worked as an artist model for the artist John Ward. In 1995, Anthony Devas was staying with Ward and Wylie was painted by him for his work Alice. She describes herself as being a "rebellious art student" at the time, adding that her look was "more Brigitte Bardot than Mills & Boon cover." The painting was subsequently used for the Rowntree's Aero girl ad campaign, which was published in 1956 in publications including the Daily Express, News of the World and People Illustrated.

After graduating, Wylie took a teacher training course at Goldsmiths, where she met her future husband, painter, Roy Oxlade. In 1968, they moved to Newnham, Kent.

In 1958, when her son Luke John was born, Wylie stopped painting to raise her children, channeling her artistic energies, she said, into "soups, jam, clothes, curtains, and Christmas cards." She did not take up painting again until the late 1970s.

In 1981, aged 47, Wylie graduated with an MA from the Royal College of Art.

== Career ==
In the 1980s and 90s Wylie struggled to gain attention for her work. She was able to fund her creative work by offering informal painting classes at their house and turning the garden into a place for students to camp. Wylie also calls herself "a radical non consumer", so rarely buys new things.

Wylie only began to receive recognition for her work in her seventies. In 2002, she created a group of paintings for the Tunbridge Wells Arts Centre. In 2004, these paintings were selected by Neo Rauch for the open-submission exhibition EAST in Norwich.

In 2010, Wylie was the only non-American artist represented in the Women to Watch exhibition at the National Museum of Women in the Arts, Washington D.C..

Wylie presented solo exhibitions at the Jerwood Gallery in 2012, at Tate Britain in 2013, and at the Serpentine Gallery in 2017.

Wylie was first represented by Union Gallery. In 2017, she became represented by David Zwirner Gallery.

In February 2026, Wylie became the first British female artist to occupy all of the Royal Academy of Arts main galleries with her exhibition, The Picture Comes First. The exhibition comprised over 50 paintings and 42 works on paper.

== Work ==
Wylie creates large paintings on unstretched, unprimed canvas with "stubby brushes, like scrubbing brushes so I can push things around". She also uses her fingers or applies paint straight from the tube. She often sticks, tacks and glues scraps onto the canvas to give the painting texture, with smudges and drips left apparent. "I don't mind imperfection at all," she once said in an interview, "only I don't call it imperfection—I call it "wearing out" or "it's got a stain on it" or "it's falling apart.""

Wylie's work is inspired by her daily life and sources such as movies, comic books, nature, animals, news, sports, and celebrity stories. Combining elements from these different sources, her paintings often combine high and low culture. She has painted footballers, including John Terry. She has painted several movie stars and scenes from films, such as from Quentin Tarantino films, in her Film Notes series.

She has painted scenes, football matches; still lifes of her kitchen burners; portraits of her daughter applying mascara and herself eating a cookie. She often returns to the female figure, with Marilyn Monroe, Nicole Kidman, Queen Elizabeth I, and Serena Williams appearing as returning characters in her work.

Words and phrases frequently appear in Wylie's paintings. These sometimes reference the stories, films, or personal memories behind the imagery. They are also treated as shapes and compositional elements.

== Exhibitions ==
=== Solo ===
Year	Title	Institution	Location	Ref
2012		Jerwood Gallery	London	
2013		Tate Britain	London	
	Rose Wylie: Pink Girls, Yellow curls	Städtische Galerie	Wolfsburg	
2016		Douglas Hyde Gallery	Dublin	
2017	Rose Wylie: Quack Quack	Serpentine Gallery	London	
2020	Rose Wylie: where i am and was	Aspen Art Museum	Aspen, Colorado	
2022	Car and Girls	David Zwirner	London	
2025	Rose Wylie: When Found becomes Given	David Zwirner	London	
	Rose Wylie: Flick and Float	Zentrum Paul Klee	Bern	
2026	The Picture Comes First	Royal Academy of Arts	London	

=== Group ===
Year	Title	Institution	Location	Ref
2010	Women to Watch	National Museum of Women in the Arts	Washington D.C	
2013	Summer Exhibition	Royal Academy of Arts	London	

== Collections ==
Wylie has work in private and public collections including:

- Tate
- Arts Council Collection
- Jerwood Foundation
- Hammer Collection
- York City Art Gallery

== Awards ==
Wylie has won and been elected for several awards and honours for her work including:

- 2009 – Finalist (of seven) – Threadneedle Prize
- 2011 – Winner – Paul Hamlyn Foundation Prize for Visual Arts
- 2014 – Winner – John Moores Painting Prize
- 2014 – Elected a Royal Academician
- 2015 – Winner – Charles Wollaston Award for "most distinguished work" in the Royal Academy Summer Exhibition.

== Personal life ==
Wylie was married the painter Roy Oxlade in 1957, and they remained married until his death in 2014. They had three children together: Luke-John (born 1958), Elizabeth, and Henrietta.

She continues to live and work in the Kent home she once shared with Oxlade.
