= Marjorie Doggett =

Singaporean animal welfare advocate and photographer

- Born: Marjorie Joyce Millest; 21 January 1921; Hastings, England
- Died: 15 August 2010 (aged 89); Singapore
- Citizenship: Singaporean
- Occupations: Animal rights advocate, photographer
- Notable work: Characters of Light (1957)
- Spouse: Victor Doggett (m. 10 April 1952)
- Parent(s): Frank and Edith Millest
- Relatives: Nicolas Millest Doggett (b. 10 October 1958)
- Awards: Singapore Women's Hall of Fame

Marjorie Doggett (née Millest, 21 January 1921 – 15 August 2010) was a Singaporean animal welfare advocate, architectural photographer, and heritage conservationist. She was a founding member of the Society for the Prevention of Cruelty to Animals in Singapore. Her 1957 photo-book, Characters of Light, was the first book to capture Singapore's urban landscape and the first local photographic book by a woman. Her prints and films are preserved at the National Archives of Singapore.

== Early life ==
Doggett was born in Hastings on 31 January 1921. She was the second daughter of Frank and Edith Millest. She attended Wallington High School for Girls.

Her earliest experience with animals was spending time with them on her grandfather's farm. When she was sixteen, she heard a talk given by her headmistress about laboratory animals used in the school and felt that they were being made to suffer.

In an interview by The Straits Times, she described how, as a teenager, she was taught the basic skills of film development and printing by a local chemist. Since then, she had continued photography on her own, compiling her first album in April 1940.

During World War II, she trained as a nurse at the Royal East Sussex Hospital. Despite wartime shortages of film, paper, and chemicals, she continued to pursue photography, bringing her camera "into the sterilized rooms to capture their drama". The negatives of these films are currently held by the National Archives of Singapore. Sometime during the war, she met her future husband, Victor Doggett. The two were photographed together at Haywards Heath, West Sussex in the summer of 1944.

== Life in Singapore ==
Marjorie and Victor Doggett landed at Singapore in February 1947. They rented a garage at Upper Serangoon in the North-East Region of Singapore. Soon after their arrival, Marjorie began working on a photo album featuring colonial buildings, palm trees, roofed homes, and fishing craft. She took up various odd jobs, including dance partner at a tango school and post-natal advisor for Nestlé. Meanwhile, Victor became a part-time music teacher. He passed the Royal Schools of Music exam with merit in 1949 and opened his own school, The Music Studio, in Lavender Street in the same year. The couple became citizens of the self-governing Singapore on 13 June 1961.

=== Animal advocacy ===
Marjorie became involved in the promotion of animal welfare. There were few veterinarians in Singapore in those days, so she would rescue cats from the streets and drive them to the government-run Animal Infirmary in Kampong Java. Her work was the beginning of what is now the Singapore Society for the Prevention of Cruelty to Animals. In 1954, the organisation, then known as the Royal Society for the Prevention of Cruelty to Animals, was formally set up at Orchard Road. Doggett continued to work to raise awareness of cruelty to animals, writing letters to The Straits Times on a variety of animal welfare issues. In 1974, primatologist Shirley McGreal contacted Doggett about illegal wildlife trading. The two women ended up working together for more than 25 years. They uncovered several smuggling incidents and even posed as animal collectors to discover illegal animal trafficking.

In 1982, Doggett became an advisory director for the World Society for the Protection of Animals (WSPA) and the secretary of the International Primate Protection League (IPPL). In 1984, she started a regular column for the SPCA Bulletin.

=== Photography ===
Doggett's photography matured in Singapore. Most of her prints were taken with a medium-format Rolleicord camera on a tripod to allow for slow exposures. Having no proper darkroom, she set up enlarger and chemical trays in her bedroom and washed films and prints in the bathroom. From 1954-55, she entered prints for the Pan-Malayan Photographic Exhibitions, organized by The Singapore Camera Club. She also made several expeditions to Malaya, photographing the eastern coast. There, she became acquainted with Ismail Nasiruddin Shah, the 16th Sultan of Terengganu and a pioneer of pre-war Malayan photography. The Doggett family continued their week-long trips to Malaysia until the late 1990s, which evolved, over the years, into a comprehensive lepidoptera field study.

On 20 May 1957, a selection of Doggett's photographs appeared as Characters of Light: A Guide to the Buildings of Singapore, published by British book agent Donald Moore. The book features 79 buildings with detailed captions about their origins, architects, builders, and styles. It received positive reviews in the press and was praised in The Straits Times for being "exactly the kind of book that unknowingly we have been waiting for." The Sunday Standard described it as "a highly distinguished picture chronicle of the buildings of Singapore by one of the Colony's own photographers, who has also written the text with clarity and simplicity."

In the 1960s, Doggett played an active role in the public debate about colonial architecture and heritage conservation. She wrote three lengthy letters to The Straits Times, remarking that Singapore would "be poor indeed if, amongst all its dynamic modern environment and recreational activity, there is no place for the thinkers and 'dreamers of dreams."

The second edition of Characters of Light was published in 1985 by Times Books. The book jacket showed "Joshua", a Katong mansion near the Doggett's home in Amber Road. The new edition was spearheaded by Goh Eck Keng of Eastern Universities Press. Subtitled Early Buildings of Singapore, it was released in June 1985 with an initial print run of 5,000 copies. It was 46 pages longer than the 1957 edition and contained 28 more photographs. It also included an appendix for all the buildings in the book, sponsored by the Preservation of Monuments Board. The book received extensive coverage in the media.

== Later life and legacy ==
After the 1985 reissue of Characters of Light, Doggett devoted herself to animal advocacy.

She died on 15 August 2010 in her home in Toh Heights. She was 89 years old. She had been diagnosed with Alzheimer's disease, but still loved and protected animals up to her last days.

In 2017, Doggett was inducted into the Singapore Women's Hall of Fame for her advocacy work with animals.

== Published works ==
A selection of Doggett's photography was published in 1957 by Donald Moore, a British-born book agent, publisher, and impresario. Characters of Light: A Guide to the Buildings of Singapore was the first photo-book to capture Singapore's urban landscape and the first of its kind by a female photographer. Seventy-nine photos, taken with a Rolleicord, were printed on wood-free paper with short essay captions from Doggett, presenting the buildings in their historical context. The book differed from its contemporaries in that it was not primarily concerned with Singapore's natural landscape or social conditions. Rather, the photos were products of meticulous research and formed a valuable record of Singapore's architectural heritage. In the Foreword, Doggett expressed her gratitude to Carl Alexander Gibson-Hill, curator of the Raffles Museum, and architects T.H.H. Hancock and Lincoln Page.

The first edition of the book was published two years before Singapore's first general elections, after which the country underwent rapid housing and economic development. In 1985, Times Book International issued a revised edition of Characters of Light with higher production quality and length. The original publication was expanded to include 38 additional photographs and more elaborate commentaries from Doggett on heritage and architectural preservation.

In Conserving the Past, Creating the Future, geographer Lily Kong wrote that Doggett's photo-book recorded "the beauty of the pre-war buildings at a time of impending change."

In 2019, NUS Press published Marjorie Doggett's Singapore, a new illustrated book that included previously unpublished photos of Marjorie Doggett, courtesy of the National Archives of Singapore, and an accompanying narrative on Doggett's life and legacy, penned by Edward Stokes, founder of the Photographic Heritage Foundation. It highlights Doggett's pioneering role as a female photographer, author, and book creator.

Doggett's photos were also published in T.H.H. Hancock's 1986 publication, Coleman's Singapore and Julian Davison's 2019 publication, Swan & Maclaren: A Story of Singapore Architecture.
