= John Hubbard (artist) =

American painter

- Born: 1931; Ridgefield, Connecticut
- Died: 6 January 2017 (aged 85)
- Awards: Jerwood Painting Prize, 1996
- Website: www.johnhubbard.com

John Hubbard (1931 – 6 January 2017) was an American-born abstract impressionist painter who lived and worked in England for more than 50 years. He won the Jerwood Painting Prize in 1996.

== Life ==
John Hubbard was born in Ridgefield, Connecticut in 1931. He attended Harvard University before serving three years of military service with the US Army in Japan during the Korean War. From 1956 he studied at the Art Students League of New York and had evening classes with Hans Hoffman. John then visited Rome and travelled throughout Europe. He married in 1961 and chose to settle near Bridport in Dorset. John enjoyed travelling, visiting Greece, the Netherlands, Morocco and many locations in France and Spain. He died in 2017 at the age of 85.

== Career ==
From 1963 to 1965 Hubbard taught at Camberwell School of Art in London. He also worked as a designer, creating sets and costumes for ballet companies including the Dutch National Ballet and the Royal Ballet, tapestries for the Said Business School, Oxford, and the National Visual Arts Gallery in Kuala Lumpur. During his life, Hubbard had solo exhibitions at the Museum of Modern Art in Oxford, the Yale Center for British Art in New Haven, Connecticut and at Marlborough Fine Art in London. He was a member of numerous arts panels and boards, including for the Tate St Ives, Southwest Arts and Arts Council. Public commissions include paintings produced for the Royal Parks, Dorchester Hospital, and Smith and Nephew, as well those produced while artist-in-residence in New Harmony, Indiana. His work is represented in many private and public collections including the Art Gallery of Ontario, the Fitzwilliam Museum in Cambridge, the National Visual Arts Gallery in Kuala Lumpur, the National Gallery of Victoria, the Pennsylvania Academy of the Fine Arts, Philadelphia, the Scottish National Gallery of Modern Art in Edinburgh, the Tate Gallery, the Victoria and Albert Museum and the Yale Center for British Art.
