= Juliette Losq =

British artist (born 1978)

- Born: 1978 (age 47–48)
- Education: Courtauld Institute of Art
- Known for: Photorealism
- Website: https://www.losq.co.uk/

Juliette Losq (born 1978, London, UK) is a London-based contemporary artist known for photorealistic pieces. She is the recipient of several awards for her art. Her work is part of the permanent collection at the Saatchi Gallery, the All Visual Arts collection, and in Cambridge's New Hall Art Collection.

Losq received a BA in English Literature and Art History at Newnham College, Cambridge, commencing her studies in 1997. In 2001, Losq received a Master of Arts in 18th century British and French Art from the Courtauld Institute of Art. She graduated with a BA in Fine Art: Painting from Wimbledon College of Arts in 2007. She was awarded her MA in Fine Art from Royal Academy Schools in 2010.

== Awards ==
As a first year undergraduate arts student, Losq won the Jerwood Drawing Prize, the UK’s most prestigious drawing competition. The chair of the judges panel commented: “The most staggering thing after we decided on the winner, of course we didn’t know her name, was that it was a student – a first year BA student – who happened to go to Wimbledon College of Art.”

In 2010 she received the first place Winsor & Newton Painting Prize.

In 2014 she was voted John Moores Painting Prize Visitors’ Choice for her watercolor work Vinculum, described as "a stunning feat, belying the usual expectations of a watercolour... with its dizzying sense of perspective and incredible detail."

She was awarded the John Ruskin Prize 2019, a multi-disciplinary award for those "artists, designers and makers whose work defies easy categorisation".

== Selected exhibitions ==
- 2010: RA Schools Show, London
- 2013: Viewing Room, All Visual Arts
- 2015:The Tragedy of Landscape, Griffin Gallery, London
- 2016: Juliette Losq: Terra Infirma, Waterhouse & Dodd, London
- 2019: Corpus, Mall Galleries, London
