= Charles Boyle (poet) =

British poet

- Born: 1955 (age 70–71); Leeds, England
- Other names: Jack Robinson; Jennie Walker
- Education: Cambridge University
- Occupations: Poet, novelist, publisher
- Known for: Founder of CB editions
- Notable work: 24 for 3
- Spouse: Madeleine Strindberg (m. 1980)
- Awards: McKitterick Prize

Charles Boyle (born 1955 in Leeds) is a British poet and novelist. He also uses the pseudonyms Jack Robinson and Jennie Walker. As Walker, he won the 2008 McKitterick Prize for his novella 24 for 3.

In 2012, Boyle wrote a short piece for The Times Literary Supplement in which he good-naturedly referred to vandalism of this Wikipedia biography.

== Biography ==
Boyle read English at Cambridge University, taught in a Sheffield comprehensive school and in Egypt and worked in publishing, including for several years at Faber and Faber.

In 1980, he married painter Madeleine Strindberg.

Boyle is well known for his 2001 book of poems The Age of Cardboard and String, which had favourable reviews from The Guardian ("The voice is quite beguiling: completely unpretentious yet still resonant and lyrical; linguistically precise and emotionally evasive, often at the same time. We like that.") and Magma Poetry ("['My Alibi'] is an exquisite distillation of much of what Boyle has to say".

In 2007, as a result of his difficulty in getting 24 for 3 published, he established CB editions, a small press dedicated to novellas, translations, and writing in other genres often neglected by mainstream publishers.

Titles published by CB editions have won awards including the McKitterick Prize, the Scott Moncrieff Translation Prize, the Aldeburgh First Collection Prize, and the Republic of Consciousness Prize, as well as being shortlisted for the Goldsmiths Prize, the Guardian First Book Award, and Forward Prizes for Poetry.

Boyle's An Overcoat: Scenes from the Afterlife of H.B. (2016), written under the pseudonym "Jack Robinson", was featured in The Guardian's "Nicholas Lezard's choice" column in April 2017, with Lezard concluding: "I can't think of a wittier, more engaging, stylistically audacious, attentive and generous writer working in the English language right now".

== Awards ==
- 1981: Cholmondeley Award
- 1996: Forward Prize shortlist for Paleface
- 2001: T. S. Eliot Prize shortlist for The Age of Cardboard and String
- 2001: Whitbread Awards shortlist for The Age of Cardboard and String
- 2008: McKitterick Prize for 24 for 3 (as Jennie Walker)

== Works ==
- Paleface (paperback ed.). Faber and Faber. 1 April 1996. ASIN B00VYP9KRO.
- The Age of Cardboard and String (paperback ed.). Faber and Faber. 19 March 2001. ISBN 978-0571206674.
- The Manet Girl (paperback ed.). Salt Publishing. 15 February 2013. ISBN 978-1907773457.
- The Other Jack (paperback ed.). CB Editions. 1 June 2021. ISBN 9781909585416.

=== As Jennie Walker ===
- 24 for 3 (UK open market ed.). Bloomsbury Publishing. 6 July 2009. ISBN 978-0747598756.

=== As Jack Robinson ===
- Recessional (Paperback ed.). CB Editions. 24 April 2009. ASIN B01HCADYLW.
- Days and Nights in W12 (Paperback ed.). CB Editions. 10 November 2010. ISBN 978-0956107374.
- An Overcoat: Scenes from the Afterlife of H.B. Paperback (Paperback ed.). CB Editions. 17 March 2016. ISBN 978-1909585249.
