= 24 for 3 =

Novella by Jennie Walker

- First edition
- Author: 'Jennie Walker'
- Language: English
- Publisher: CB Editions/Bloomsbury (UK); Soho Press (US)
- Publication date: 2007 (UK), 2010 (US)
- Publication place: United Kingdom
- Media type: Print & eBook
- Pages: 128
- Awards: McKitterick Prize
- ISBN: 0-9557285-0-9
- Dewey Decimal: 823.92
- LC Class: PR6052.O9196 A12 2008

24 for 3 is a 2007 novella by Jennie Walker (a pen name of English poet Charles Boyle); it won the 2008 McKitterick Prize. (awarded to authors over 40 for their first novel) and was selected by Karl Miller of the Times Literary Supplement as one of his books of the year in 2008.

== Title and setting ==
The title comes from England's second innings score at the start of the final day of a Test cricket match against India, which forms the backdrop to the story; each of the chapters is set on one day of the five-day match; from Friday through to Tuesday.

== Author identity ==
It was only at the Society of Authors awards ceremony in June 2008 that most people realised that the author was in fact a man: 'Many initially assumed Boyle must be Walker's agent when he walked up to accept the £4,000 McKitterick Prize'.

== Plot introduction ==
A woman whose life is split between her lover (a loss adjuster) and husband worries about the whereabouts of her teenage son and wonders about the rules of cricket. Her husband draws elaborate diagrams of fielding positions, in contrast her lover prefers mystery. As the woman becomes more intrigued by the game she draws parallels between the characters in her life and the strategies of the game...

== Publication history ==
The author was frustrated at his inability to find a publisher. On the same day as a rejection arrived he received an inheritance from a relative's will enabling him to set up his own publishing house CB Editions to get it in to print. After receiving positive reviews the book then gained the backing of Bloomsbury Publishing who published it with a quote on the cover from Mick Jagger saying that he 'loved it'. It was published under the title The Rules of Play in the US by Soho Press in 2010.

== Reviews ==
James Smart writing in The Guardian concludes "Evocative and clever, this concise tale is engaging rather than resounding, a deft clip for two rather than a thrilling slog for six."

Lionel Shriver praises the novel in The Daily Telegraph: "24 for 3 is written with a beguiling simplicity, and the small wisdoms it offers up are readily accessible to readers (like this one) who have never been able to make head or tail of cricket. Its clarity and musing tone perfectly suit a rainy afternoon. Indeed, this is an ideal release for August, save for the pity that you can't slip it in your spouse's stocking until December."

Benjamin Golby from The Cricket Monthly writes "24 for 3 is not a standard cricket novel. Not that there will ever be one. The writing on cricket is striking yet it's a book one is more confident commending to the keen reader of sophisticated contemporary literature than an all-and-sundry sports fan...24 for 3 is an exercise with a theme, using the range of cricket as a literary tool. That, you may worry, risks being abstruse, but the reward is a cricket book that is unexpected and thoughtful.
