= Madeleine Strindberg =

German painter

- Born: 1955 (age 70–71)
- Education: Byam Shaw School of Art; Royal College of Art
- Occupation: Artist
- Spouse: Charles Boyle (m. 1980)
- Awards: Jerwood Painting Prize

Madeleine Strindberg (born 1955) is a German-born artist, winner of the 1998 Jerwood Painting Prize.

== Education ==
Strindberg graduated from the Byam Shaw School of Art and Royal College of Art in 1985 with a master's degree in painting.

== Work ==
Strindberg won the Barclays Bank Award in 1985. She was the Artist in Residence at the National Gallery in 1989. That same year, she also won the GLC Peace Prize. In 1996, she was awarded the Abbey Award in Painting by the British School at Rome. She was one of the artists shortlisted for the John Moores Painting Prize in 1997. In 2000, she was once again on the shortlist for the Charles Wollaston Award.

Preferring to be called an artist as opposed to a painter, Strindberg works with various media. She uses 3-dimensional objects, photography and video, as well as the written word to convey her subject matter. Painting remains her most frequent medium. She uses a lot of unusual materials in her work, from newspaper cuttings to pages from scientific textbooks to her own writings.

== Exhibitions ==
Strindberg has held numerous exhibitions. Her exhibitions explored various themes. Her exhibition "Just Look at Yourself!" portrayed the psychologically charged internal world. Another unique work was "Central Nervous System". Her "Among the Believers" was a strong political statement on the occupation of Iraq.

== Style ==
Strindberg's work is somewhere between expressionism and grunge minimalism. Her work is not one that can be seen as belonging to one particular. Rather it is ceaseless striving to attain meaning through unusual and experimental means.

== Awards ==
She was chosen from more than 1200 artists to win the Jerwood Painting Prize in 1998, for her delicate paintings, which explored aspects of the human body. She has subsequently used MRI sections through the human brain to create her abstract works.

Four of her oil paintings are in UK public collections (including the Jerwood Collection).

== Personal life ==
In 1980, Strindberg married Charles Boyle, a poet.

Strindberg has lived in London, UK, for most of her life and worked from a studio in Bow for 25 years. She had multiple sclerosis and, in 2011, was forced out of the studio by the landlord for not using it enough.
