= James Taylor (sportsman) =

Scottish cricketer, umpire, rugby union player & international rugby union referee

Personal information
- Full name: James Alexander Simson Taylor
- Born: 19 June 1917; Weston-super-Mare, Somerset, England
- Died: 16 May 1993 (aged 75); Edinburgh, Midlothian, Scotland
- Batting: Right-handed
- Bowling: Right-arm medium

International information
- National side: Scotland

Domestic team information
- Years: Team
- 1952–1954: Scotland
- 1937: Leicestershire

Career statistics
Competition	First-class
Matches	9
Runs scored	198
Batting average	19.80
100s/50s	–/1
Top score	78
Balls bowled	97
Wickets	1
Bowling average	58.00
5 wickets in innings	–
10 wickets in match	–
Best bowling	1/11
Catches/stumpings	12/–
- Source: Cricinfo, 30 October 2011

Major James Alexander Simson Taylor TD (19 June 1917 – 16 May 1993) was an English born Scottish cricketer, umpire, rugby union player and international rugby union referee.

== Early life, cricket and rugby ==
Taylor was born at Weston-super-Mare, Somerset, but was educated at Oakham School in Rutland and Wyggeston Grammar School for Boys. He later undertook studies at the University of Cambridge and Carnegie College, Leeds.

A right-handed batsman who bowled right-arm medium pace, he made his first-class cricket debut for Leicestershire against Lancashire in 1937 County Championship. He made two further first-class appearances for the county in that season, against Glamorgan and Warwickshire. He scored 49 runs at an average of 12.25, with a high score of 22 in his three matches. While playing for Leicestershire he also took what would be his only first-class wicket, that of Emrys Davies.

Taylor served during World War II, entering service with the Northamptonshire Regiment as a 2nd Lieutenant in October 1940.

== Move to Scotland ==
He later moved to Scotland in 1948, where he transferred from the Northamptonshire Regiment to the Royal Scots and was at the same time promoted to lieutenant. On 1 June 1950 he was still serving in the Royal Scots and at this time was promoted to captain. In October 1950 he was awarded the Territorial Decoration for his service in the Territorial Army. He was removed from the Active List in February 1951, but was allowed to retain his then rank of captain. Following the war he taught at Loretto School, having started teaching there in 1951, where he helped run the schools Combined Cadet Force.

He first appeared for the Scotland in first-class cricket in 1952 against Yorkshire. He made five further first-class appearances for Scotland, the last of which came against the touring Pakistanis in 1954. In his six first-class matches for Scotland, he scored 149 runs at an average of 24.83, with a high score of 78. Later in 1957, Taylor finally resigned his commission from the Territorial Army, but was again allowed to retain the rank of captain. He was still teaching at the school in 1966, the year in which he was promoted to lieutenant, the highest substantive rank in the Combined Cadet Force. He resigned his commission in the Combined Cadet Force in January 1971, upon which he was granted the honorary rank of Major.

He later briefly stood as an umpire in first-class cricket, once in 1978 when Scotland played Ireland and again in 1979 when Scotland played the touring Sri Lankans. He died at Edinburgh, Midlothian on 16 May 1993.
