= Alex Martin (cricketer) =

English cricketer (born 1992)

Personal information
- Full name: Alexander Thomas Martin
- Born: 17 November 1992 (age 33); Huntingdon, Huntingdonshire, England
- Batting: Right-handed
- Role: Wicket-keeper

Domestic team information
- Years: Team
- 2013–2014: Bedfordshire
- 2014–2017: Oxford MCCU

Career statistics
Competition	First-class
Matches	3
Runs scored	52
Batting average	8.66
100s/50s	–/–
Top score	28
Catches/stumpings	1/–
- Source: Cricinfo, 25 July 2019

Alexander Thomas Martin (born 7 November 1992) is an English former first-class cricketer.

Martin was born at Huntingdon in November 1992. He was educated at Oakham School, before going up to Oxford Brookes University. While studying at Oxford Brookes, he made his debut in first-class cricket for Oxford MCCU against Nottinghamshire at Oxford in 2014. He made two further first-class appearances for Oxford MCCU, against Surrey and Warwickshire in 2017. He scored 52 runs in his three matches, with a high score of 28. In addition to playing first-class cricket, Martin also played minor counties cricket for Bedfordshire in 2013 and 2014, making ten appearances in the Minor Counties Championship and eight appearances in the MCCA Knockout Trophy.
