= Bhargav Modha =

English cricketer

Personal information
- Full name: Bhargav Ramesh Modha
- Born: 20 October 1985 (age 41); Jamnagar, Gujarat, India
- Height: 6 ft 1 in (1.85 m)
- Batting: Right-handed
- Bowling: Leg break

Domestic team information
- Years: Team
- 2007: Cambridge UCCE

Career statistics
Competition	First-class
Matches	3
Runs scored	41
Batting average	13.66
100s/50s	–/–
Top score	27
Balls bowled	432
Wickets	7
Bowling average	44.57
5 wickets in innings	–
10 wickets in match	–
Best bowling	3/101
Catches/stumpings	2/–
- Source: Cricinfo, 3 September 2020

Bhargav Ramesh Modha (born 20 October 1985) is an Indian-born English former first-class cricketer.

Modha was born at Jamnagar in October 1985. Emigrating to England as a child, he was educated at Oakham School, where he was a part of the England and Wales Cricket Board's fast-track spin bowling programme in 2004 under Terry Jenner. From Oakham he went up to Anglia Ruskin University, where he played first-class cricket for Cambridge UCCE in 2007, making three appearances against Northamptonshire, Derbyshire and Essex. (Note: Cambridge UCCE differed from Cambridge University Cricket Club in that it was open to students at Anglia Ruskin University, whereas Cambridge University Cricket Club is exclusively for students of the constituent colleges of the University of Cambridge.) Modha scored 41 runs in his three matches, in addition to taking 7 wickets with his leg break bowling.
