= Prunella Clough =

British artist

- Prunella Clough, c. 1958, photograph by Lord Snowdon
- Born: 14 November 1919; London, United Kingdom
- Died: 26 December 1999 (aged 80); London, United Kingdom
- Known for: Painting

Prunella Clough (14 November 1919 – 26 December 1999) was a prominent British artist. She is known mostly for her paintings, though she also made prints and created assemblages of collected objects. She was awarded the Jerwood Prize for painting, and received a retrospective exhibition at Tate Britain.

== Background ==
Born on 14 November 1919 in Chelsea, London to an affluent upper-middle-class family, she was initially educated privately by her father, the poet Eric Taylor, before enrolling as a part-time student at the Chelsea School of Art (now Chelsea College of Art and Design) in 1937. In 1938, she took classes at Chelsea with the sculptor Henry Moore. Her aunt was Irish designer Eileen Gray. Clough lived in London throughout her career.

== Career ==
Apart from wartime service, during which she worked as a cartographer for the Office of War Information, Clough painted full-time until her death in 1999, supplementing her income with teaching posts at Chelsea (1956–1969) and Wimbledon School of Art (1966–1997). The Clough-Taylor family often holidayed in Southwold, and in 1945 Clough's mother Thora Clough purchased Woldside house in Southwold, which became an important base for the artist until it was sold after Thora's death in 1966. Clough retained strong links with the area throughout her career; the coastal landscape, a local quarry, and fishermen at nearby Lowestoft and Yarmouth harbours provided significant early subjects. Clough also produced a number of still lifes. Clough had her first solo show at the Leger Gallery in London in 1947. In 1951, Clough participated in the exhibition 60 Paintings for '51, organised by the Arts Council to coincide with the 1951 Festival of Britain, for which they commissioned 60 artists to produce paintings of 4 by 5 feet or more. Clough's submission was entitled Lowestoft Harbour (1951), a painting of two fishermen weighing a catch of fish. The painting was subsequently purchased by the Arts Council Collection.

Clough's early subject matter led to her being linked with Neo-Romantic artists such as John Minton and Michael Ayrton. From the 1950s onwards, she increasingly painted the industrial landscapes of post-WWII Britain. Although based in London, she made frequent trips to East Anglia and the Midlands. During the 1950s, Clough became close friends with the painter and critic John Berger; they went drawing together in the marshalling yards at Willesden Junction. Clough also visited a number of factories and industrial sites with the sculptor Ghisha Koenig, and became close friends with the painter David Carr, who also shared her interest in the industrial landscape as a subject. These trips resulted in a number of paintings of men and women at work in factories and on building sites, together with images of power stations, electrical plants and chemical works. The novelist Margaret Drabble has noted that while many of her early paintings included the human figure, it gradually disappeared from her works, and Clough's canvases became more abstract during the 1960s and 1970s. In 1960, Clough had her first retrospective at the Whitechapel Art Gallery, under the directorship of the curator Bryan Robertson. During a 1982 interview with Robertson, which was published in the catalogue for an exhibition of Clough's work held that year at the Warwick Arts Trust, the artist described how: "I prefer to look at the urban or industrial scene or any unconsidered piece of ground." In the latter decades of her career, Clough made a number of abstract works that reference fragments of urban detritus and rubbish that she found on the streets of London, such as plastic bags, discarded gloves, and oil stains. The first time she exhibited these paintings was in 1989 in a show entitled Prunella Clough: Recent Paintings, 1980–1989 at Annely Juda Fine Art Gallery in London. The exhibition was a "critical and financial success" and helped Clough gain recognition and popularity. The early 1980s saw Clough embark on a series of paintings that focussed on an abstracted 'gate' motif, and she also became fascinated by the shadows cast by passing people on subway walls, creating a number of works on this theme. In 1979, Clough played a key role in helping to organise the major retrospective of Eileen Gray's work at the Victoria & Albert Museum and the Museum of Modern Art, New York.

Although Clough worked predominantly as a painter, she was also an accomplished printmaker. Clough created lithographs early in her career, and from the early 1960s often worked at the Curwen Studio in Plaistow. Throughout her career, Clough also made a number of assemblages from found objects that she gathered on her trips to industrial sites, the extent of which only became clear when these were discovered in her studio after her death.

Clough's work enjoyed increasing recognition from the 1970s onwards, with exhibitions at the Serpentine Gallery in 1976, followed by shows at the Warwick Arts Trust, the Camden Arts Centre and Kettle's Yard. From 1988 Clough was represented by Annely Juda Fine Art. In 1999, the year of her death, she was awarded the Jerwood Prize for Painting, and in 2007 she received a retrospective exhibition at Tate Britain.

Clough is recognised as an accomplished artist, although she did not achieve the same level of fame as some of her contemporaries. Her preference for privacy contributed to this relative lack of public recognition. She was also known for her generosity, both with money and with her art. She frequently allowed others to reproduce her work without seeking payment. When she sold or gave away a painting, she did not attempt to retain any control or rights over it.

== Artistic style ==
Clough's paintings often share a mild or neutral colour palette, sometimes with punctuating strong or harsh colors. Clough cites the weather in England as the probable cause for this trend. Clough often made changes to her paintings after she had begun working on them. In doing this she left traces of the old lines and shapes, creating a many-layered surface. Her actual painting techniques furthered this by adding more texture. "Clough employed thick impasto, she daubed, she scraped, she gauged and scratched, she obliterated, experimenting with a variety of mixed media". Gerard Hastings has described how Clough used a variety of tools and materials to apply paint to her canvas and create a variety of visual effects, including sandpaper, wire wool, rollers, wallpaper scrapers, and pieces of wire mesh. She would sometimes mix textured materials like sand into her paint.

Clough's paintings gave unique views of everyday features of the urban landscape. Prunella Clough sometimes took photographs of her subject matter, but more important to her was the memory of the experience of seeing something.

"Her subjects are closely observed details and scenes from the landscape. The images are combined and filtered through memory, and evolve through a slow process of layering and re-working."

In an interview with Bryan Robertson she said, "I work from the subject matter, things perceived, and the things that I see tend to be somewhat murky".

== Awards ==
- The City of London Midsummer Prize (1977)
- The £30,000 Jerwood Prize for painting (1999)
- She declined an OBE in 1968 and a CBE in 1979.

== Selected exhibitions ==
- Leger Gallery, London (1947)
- Roland, Browse and Delbanco, London (1949)
- Leicester Galleries, London (1953)
- Whitechapel Gallery, London (1960, this was her first retrospective)
- Grosvenor Gallery, London (1964, 1968)
- Bear Lane Gallery, Oxford (1971)
- Graves Art Gallery, Sheffield (1972)
- New Art Centre, London (1973, 1976)
- Serpentine Galleries, London (1976)
- Perth, Western Australia (1974)
- Edinburgh (1976)
- Aberdeen (1981)
- Warwick Arts Trust (1982)
- Hiroshima (1988)
- Annely Juda Fine Art, London (1989)
- Camden Arts Centre, London (1996)
- Austin/Desmond Fine Art, London (1996, 2012)
- Kettle's Yard, Cambridge (1999)
- The Olympia Fine Art & Antiques Fair (2004, retrospective)
- Tate Gallery (2007, retrospective)
- Pallant House Gallery (2019–20, centenary)

== Public collections ==
- Art Gallery of New South Wales
- Arts Council Collection
- Ashmolean Museum, Oxford
- Bolton Museum
- Bristol Museum and Art Gallery
- British Council Collection, London
- Camden Town Hall Extension, London
- Chelsea and Westminster Hospital, London
- Clare College, Cambridge
- Courtauld Gallery, London
- Falmouth Art Gallery, Cornwall
- Fitzwilliam Museum, Cambridge
- Government Art Collection
- Hatton Gallery, Newcastle upon Tyne
- Hepworth Gallery, Wakefield
- Herbert Art Gallery, Coventry
- Jerwood Gallery, Hastings
- Kettle's Yard, Cambridge
- Lady Margaret Hall, Oxford
- Leeds Art Gallery
- Manchester Art Gallery
- National Galleries of Scotland.
- National Museum of Wales, Cardiff
- New Walk Museum & Art Gallery, Leicester
- Pallant House Gallery, Chichester
- Pembroke College, Oxford
- Plymouth City Council Museum & Art Gallery
- Reading Museum
- Rugby Art Gallery & Museum
- Salford Museum & Art Gallery
- Southampton City Art Gallery
- Southwark Art Collection, London
- Sunderland Museum and Winter Gardens
- Tate, London
- Tate Britain, London
- 2 Willow Road (National Trust) London
- Walker Art Gallery, Liverpool
- Whitworth Gallery, Manchester
- York Art Gallery

== Death ==
She died on 26 December 1999, aged 80, following a battle with cancer.

== Favourite quote ==
"Painting is like throwing oneself into the sea to learn to swim." (Édouard Manet, often quoted in interviews by Clough)

== Sources ==
- Prunella Clough, Banks, R. (Ed.) (2003, London, Annely Juda Fine Art), ISBN 1-870280-99-7
