= Jerwood Foundation's sculpture collection =

Coordinates: 52.1977°N 1.8975°W

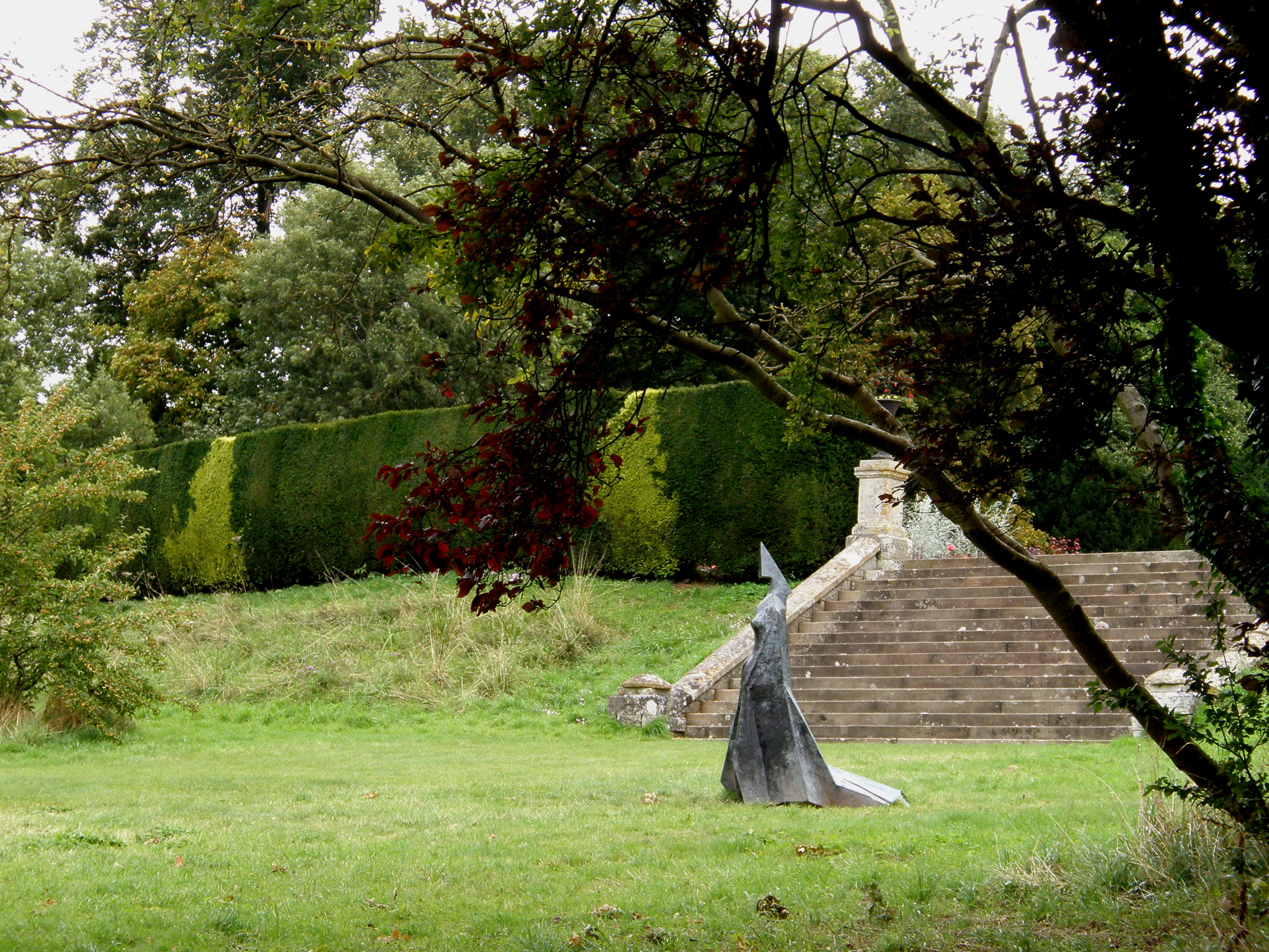
Image of the gardens, 2009

The Jerwood Foundation's sculpture collection was a collection of 20th- and 21st-century sculptures. They were displayed at Ragley Hall in Warwickshire, England. Most of the collection was sold in 2012 at Sotheby's and can no longer be seen at Ragley Hall.

From its beginning in 1999, Jerwood Sculpture displayed large sculptures in natural environments. It was established by the Jerwood Foundation, a major UK funder of arts, education and science.

Alongside works by artists of international reputation such as Elisabeth Frink, Lynn Chadwick, Kenneth Armitage, Michael Ayrton, Antony Gormley and Peter Randall-Page, the Jerwood Sculpture collection included works by emerging artists who had won the Jerwood Sculpture Prize.
