= Frank Jerwood =

British rower

Olympic medal record

Men's rowing
| Bronze medal – third place | 1908 London | Eight |

Frederick Harold Jerwood known as Frank Jerwood (29 November 1885, Keighley – 17 July 1971) was an English clergyman and rower who competed for Great Britain in the 1908 Summer Olympics, winning a bronze medal.

The son of Rev. Thomas Frederick Jerwood, rector of Little Bowden, Jerwood was educated at Oakham School and Jesus College, Cambridge and rowed as bowman for the winning Cambridge eight in the Boat Race in 1908. He was bow in the Cambridge crew which competed in the eights and won the bronze medal for Great Britain rowing at the 1908 Summer Olympics.

Jerwood took holy orders in 1911 and first served as curate at All Saints' Church, Northampton. He became chaplain at Oakham School (1914–37) where he commanded the OTC. In July 1914 he married Lilian West at Little Bowden. In 1938 he accepted the benefice of Mountsorrel. He became rector of Burton Overy from 1945 until his retirement in 1958.

Jerwood died at the age of 85.

== See also ==
- John Jerwood, his nephew
- List of Cambridge University Boat Race crews
