= Barbara Walker (artist) =

British artist

Barbara Walker MBE RA
- Born: Barbara Walker; Birmingham, England
- Education: University of Central England (BA) (1993–96); Wolverhampton University (PGCE (FE)) (2003–04)
- Awards: Evelyn Williams Drawing Award (2017)

Barbara Walker MBE RA is a British artist who lives and works in Birmingham, England. The art historian Eddie Chambers calls her "one of the most talented, productive and committed artists of her generation". She is known for colossal figurative drawings and paintings, often drawn directly onto the walls of the gallery, that frequently explore themes of documentation and recording, and erasure. Walker describes her work as social reflective practice intended to address misunderstandings and stereotypes about the African-Caribbean community in Britain.

Walker grew up in Birmingham and graduated from the University of Central England, Birmingham, in 1996. Her work is part of private and public collections including the Arts Council Collection, Fitzwilliam Museum, and the Usher Gallery. She was selected to be included in the first Diaspora Pavilion at the 57th Venice Biennale 2017.

In 2017, Walker was awarded the Evelyn Williams Drawing Award, part of the Jerwood Drawing Prize. Walker was awarded the 2020 Bridget Riley Fellowship at The British School at Rome. She was appointed a Member of the Order of the British Empire (MBE) in the 2019 New Year Honours for services to British Art.

Walker was nominated for the 2023 Turner Prize for her work Burden of Proof.

== Selected exhibitions ==
=== Solo exhibitions ===
- Being Here, The Whitworth, 2024–2025
- Place, Space and Who, Turner Contemporary, Margate, Kent, 2019–2020
- Shock and Awe, curated by Lynda Morris and Craig Ashley, mac, Birmingham, 2016
- Louder Than Words, Unit 2 Gallery, London Metropolitan University, 2006
- Testimony, Queen's Hall, Northumberland, 2005
- Private Face, EMACA, Nottingham, 2002

=== Group exhibitions ===
- Life Between Islands: Caribbean-British Art 1950s–Now, Art Gallery of Ontario, 2023–2024
- Protest and Remembrance, Alan Cristea Gallery, 2019
- UNTITLED: Art on the Conditions of Our Time, New Art Exchange, 2017
- The Meaning of Style: Black British Style, and the underlying political and social environment, New Art Exchange, Nottingham, 2010
- Families, Oxford House, London, 2006
- Birmingham Artsfest 06, 2006
- True Stories, Wolverhampton Art Gallery, 2003
- Intervention Project, Birmingham, 2002
