= Ansel Krut =

- Born: 1959 (age 66–67); Cape Town, South Africa
- Citizenship: South Africa
- Education: Royal College of Art (MA)
- Occupation: Painter

Ansel Krut (born 1959 in Cape Town, South Africa) is a painter who lives and works in London, United Kingdom.

== Education and career ==
Ansel Krut graduated with an MA in Painting from the Royal College of Art in 1986, after which he was awarded the Abbey Major scholarship to the British School in Rome. He attended the Cité internationale des arts in Paris (1982-1983), and completed his BA in Fine Art at the University of the Witwatersrand, Johannesburg (1979-1982).

Krut's technique is to construct the surfaces of his canvases with layers of colourful paint. There is a strong relationship to the structure of drawing and use of flattened pictorial space. Each canvas carries a particular and spirited character: fans, vortexes, geometric angles, dynamic and judiciously suggestive organic shapes recur throughout his compositions, revealing an abstracted, abject portraiture.

His 2010 solo exhibition at Modern Art, London was reviewed by Frieze magazine and Art in America.

In 2014, fifteen of his paintings were exhibited at the Jerwood Gallery in Hastings.

In 2016, his works were exhibited at the Saatchi Gallery in London.
