= Hastings Contemporary =

Coordinates: 50.8560606°N 0.5927716°E

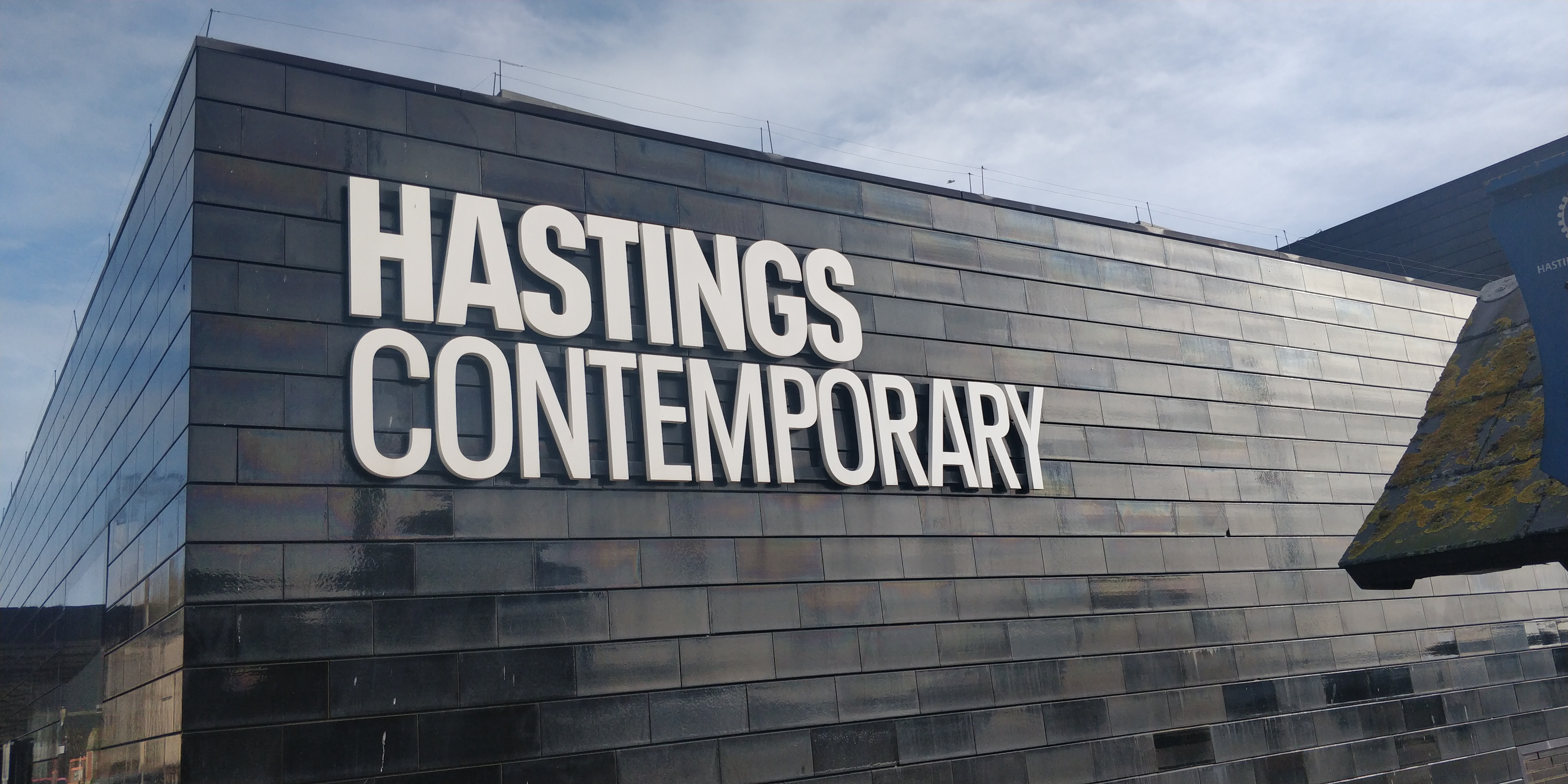
The west side of the Hastings Contemporary Gallery (formerly the Jerwood Gallery)

The Hastings Contemporary is a museum of contemporary British art located on The Stade in Hastings, East Sussex and is a not-for-profit organisation. The gallery opened in March 2012 as the Jerwood Gallery and cost £4m to build. The gallery contains temporary exhibitions that included work from artists including L. S. Lowry, Augustus John, Stanley Spencer, Walter Sickert, Ben Nicholson, Patrick Caulfield, Maggi Hambling, Craigie Aitchison and Prunella Clough.

== Architecture ==
The building was designed by Hana Loftus and Tom Grieve (son of Alan Grieve, the chairman of the Jerwood Foundation) from the architecture firm HAT Projects. The outside of the gallery building is covered with over 8,000 black tiles that were glazed in Kent. In The Observer, the architecture critic Rowan Moore says that the Jerwood building "is not embarrassed by the stuff and clobber around it, and does not embarrass them". Moore concludes that the building is "a simple and straightforward place for viewing art".

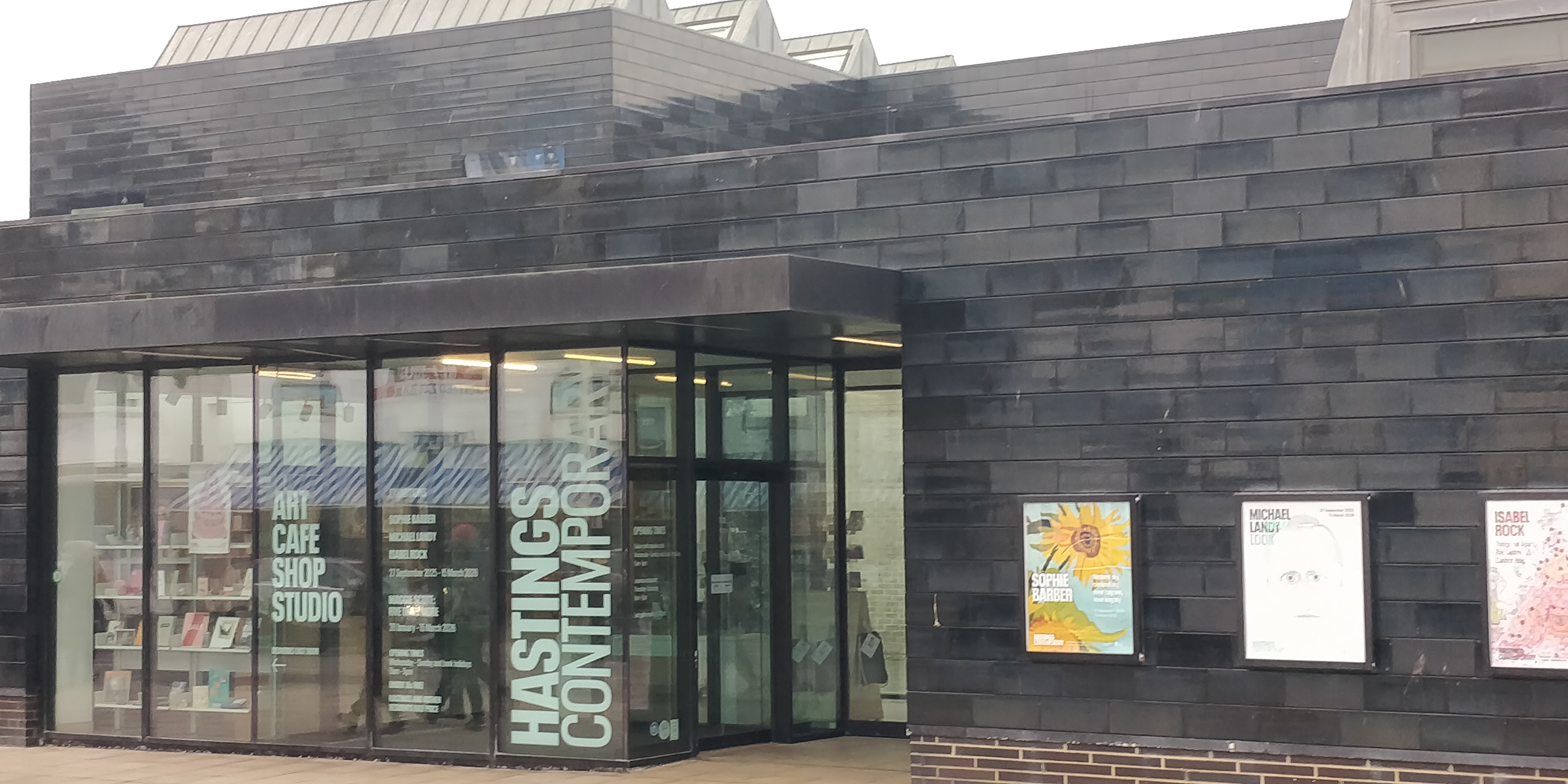
Hastings Contemporary Gallery frontage

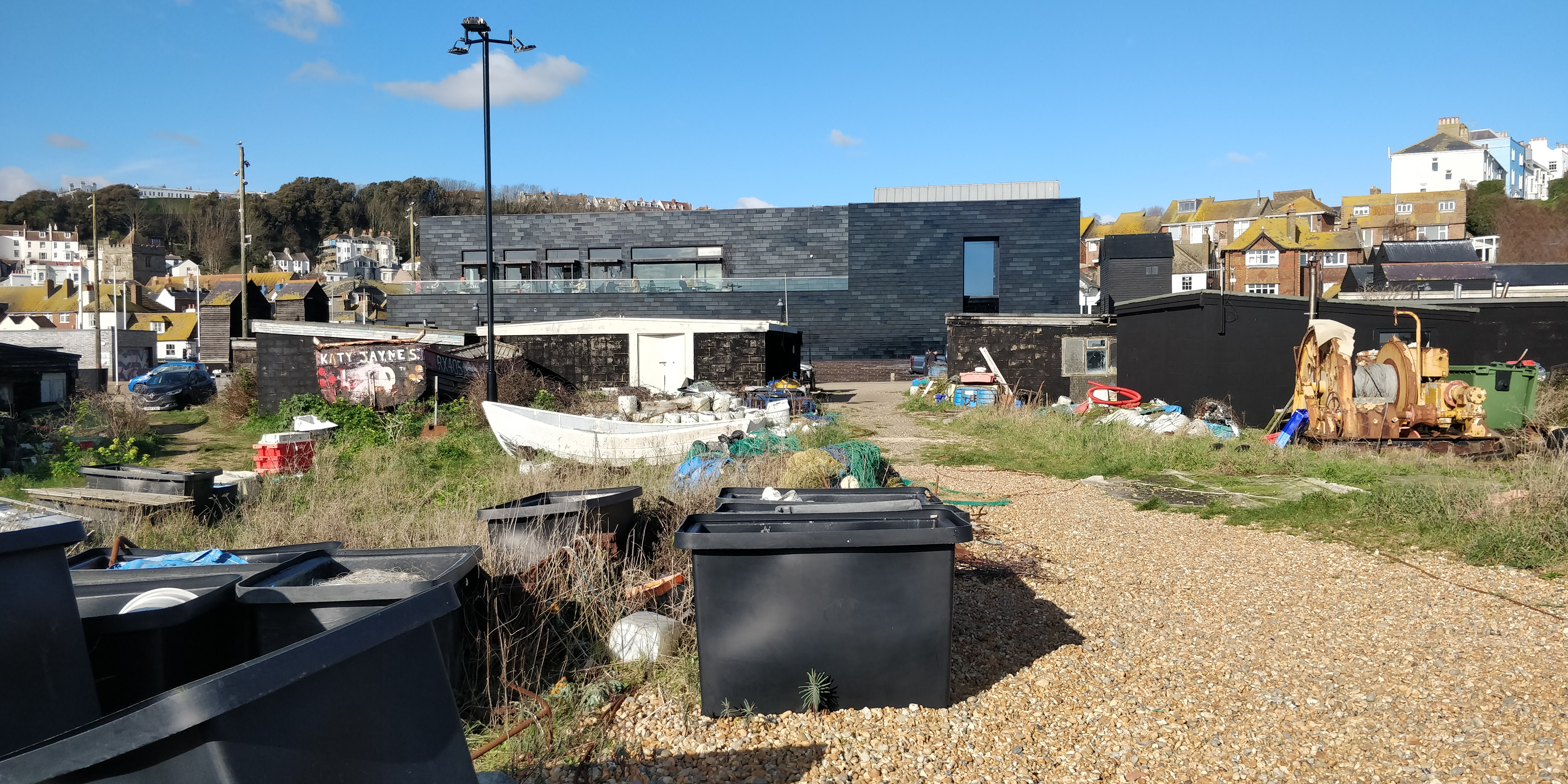
The Gallery as seen from the working beach.

Wallpaper described the gallery as "a perfectly formed, modest space, that doesn't try too hard".

The building was given a National Award in 2013 by the Royal Institute of British Architects.

== Exhibitions ==
The following artists have had exhibitions at Hastings Contemporary:

- Rose Wylie
- Gary Hume
- Gillian Ayres
- William Scott
- Philip Guston
- Basil Beattie
- Marlow Moss
- Christopher Wood
- Alfred Wallis
- Ansel Krut
- Quentin Blake
- Chantal Joffe

The gallery has also been a venue for an exhibition of art works from the Jerwood Drawing Prize in 2012.

== Controversy and opposition ==
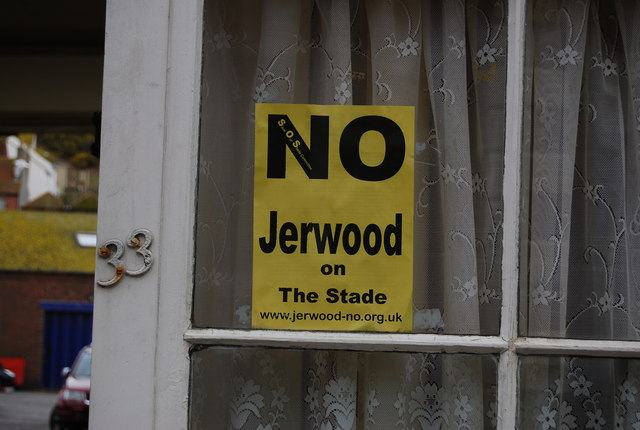
An anti-Jerwood poster in the Old Town

The building of the gallery led to protests from local residents fearing that it would lead to gentrification of the surrounding area. In 2008, the Hastings Bonfire Society burned a model of the gallery in effigy. Keith Leech from the bonfire society said that the gallery represented "a long string of things that people are trying to foist upon us".

As the gallery replaced a coach park, opponents of the development believed it would reduce the amount of business from coach trip parties, while others believe it should have been located elsewhere in the town. Posters and banners opposing the development have been displayed nearby. Local residents pay a reduced rate to enter the gallery.

== Renaming ==
In Summer 2019 the Jerwood Gallery cut ties with the Jerwood Foundation amid a funding dispute. As part of its separation, the gallery rebranded to be called Hastings Contemporary, though the building remained in the ownership of the Jerwood Foundation.

In Spring 2023, the head lease of the gallery was gifted to Hastings Borough Council by the Jerwood Foundation (Hastings Council had always owned the freehold). Hastings Council subsequently granted a 99-year lease of the building to the Hastings Contemporary charitable trust, which now runs the gallery.

The independent charity Hastings Contemporary is an Arts Council NPO receiving £100,000 per year grant from Arts Council England.
