= Jerwood Painting Prize =

The Jerwood Painting Prize was a prize for originality and excellence in painting in the United Kingdom, awarded and funded by the Jerwood Foundation. It was open to all artists born or resident in the UK, regardless of age or reputation. Winners of the prize include Craigie Aitchison, Patrick Caulfield, Prunella Clough and Maggi Hambling. The prize was instituted in 1994, and at £30,000 was the largest of its kind in Britain. The prize is no longer awarded.

== Prize winners ==
The winners of the prize were:

- 1994: Craigie Aitchison
- 1995: Maggi Hambling and Patrick Caulfield
- 1996: John Hubbard
- 1997: Gary Hume
- 1998: Madeleine Strindberg
- 1999: Prunella Clough
- 2000: no award
- 2001: Katie Pratt
- 2002: Callum Innes
- 2003: Shani Rhys James

== See also ==
- Jerwood Award
- Jerwood Drawing Prize
- List of European art awards
