= Jerwood Foundation =

Jerwood Foundation is an independent grant-making foundation in the United Kingdom. In 1999 the Jerwood Foundation established the Jerwood Charitable Foundation, a registered charity under English law.

== History ==
The Jerwood Foundation was established in 1977 by Alan Grieve for John Jerwood, an international businessman and philanthropist. Since Jerwood's death in 1991 it has been administered by Grieve. The Jerwood Foundation is a patron of the arts.

The Foundation has made strategic capital grants reflecting its support for the arts and education. In 2012 the Foundation placed the Jerwood Collection of 20th and 21st Century works of art in the public domain on display in the Jerwood Gallery in Hastings, but in 2019 the Gallery cut ties with the Foundation amid a funding dispute and the Foundation withdrew its collection while the gallery rebranded to be called Hastings Contemporary (as a venue for temporary exhibitions) though remaining in the building owned by the Jerwood Foundation.

Other capital grants made by the foundation include:

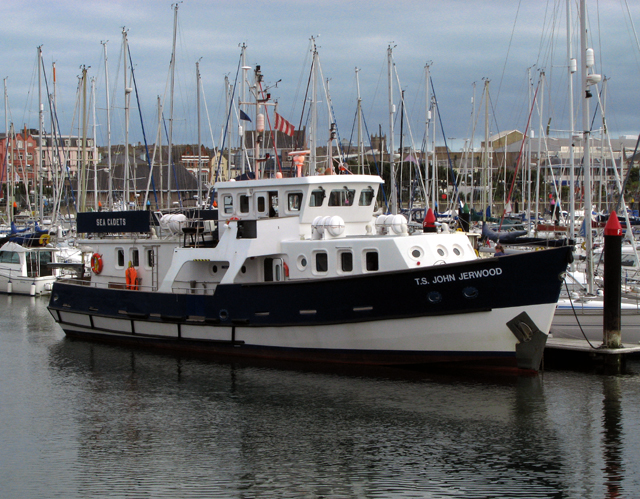
TS John Jerwood at Bangor

- Jerwood Library: Trinity Hall, Cambridge
- Jerwood Gallery: Natural History Museum, London
- Royal Court Theatre, London
- Jerwood Vanburgh Theatre: RADA, London
- Jerwood Studio: Glyndebourne, East Sussex
- Jerwood Medical Education Centre: Royal College of Physicians, London
- TS John Jerwood: Sea Cadets Association
- Jerwood Hall: LSO St Luke's, London
- Jerwood Centre at Wordsworth Trust, Grasmere
- Jerwood School of Design: Oakham School, Rutland
- Jerwood Kiln Studio: Aldeburgh, Suffolk

== Jerwood Collection of Modern and Contemporary British Art ==
The Jerwood Collection of Modern and Contemporary British art is a privately owned collection of 20th- and 21st-century British art. The Jerwood Collection is home to a sizable collection of paintings, works on paper, sculptures, and prints by British artists such as Wilhelmina Barns-Graham, Barbara Hepworth, John Piper, Stanley Spencer, Barbara Walker and Rose Wylie. The entire collection can be seen on Art UK and are available for loan. The Jerwood Collection was established with the goals of increasing public access to a privately owned collection and fostering appreciation for this era of British art. The collection continues to grow with new acquisitions and donations and is widely accessible through loans to national and international institutions.

== Prizes ==
Prizes funded by the Foundation include the Jerwood Award, the Jerwood Drawing Prize, Jerwood Painting Prize and the Jerwood Fiction Uncovered Prize.

The Evelyn Walker Drawing Prize was introduced in 2017, in association with the Evelyn Williams Trust. Worth £10,000, the prize is intended to support an individual artist with a significant track record to develop and make new drawings for a solo exhibition.

== See also ==
- Jerwood Space
- Jerwood Sculpture Prize
