= Jerwood Sculpture Prize =

The Jerwood Sculpture Prize was launched in 2001 as an initiative of the Jerwood Foundation. This commissioning prize aims to give support to emerging talent within the medium of outdoor sculpture. Since the inaugural Prize, the intention has been that the commissioned work joins the Jerwood Foundation's sculpture collection at Ragley Hall.

Originally open to artists under the age of 35, the second year of the prize saw the modification of the entry criteria so that all artists who are within 15 years of graduation from a recognised School of Art are eligible. Also, to remove anxieties about production and casting costs, the second year saw an increase in the value of the Prize, rising from £20,000 to £25,000.

It has evolved that the commission is offered approximately every eighteen months, as each Prize Year sees the full completion of the commission before the next Prize is launched.

== Winners ==
- 2001 Benedict Carpenter for his large bronze work, Universal Object
- 2003 Gereon Krebber for his aluminium sculpture entitled Tin
- 2005 Judith Dean for her site inspired bronze piece, Field
- 2007 Juliet Haysom for her ephemeral water vapour work entitled Spring
- 2008 Nicholas Rena for his bold clay vessels, 'The Ecstasy of St Teresa'
- 2009 Michael Visocchi for his work entitled Yield

== General references ==
- "Jerwood Sculpture Prize". Archived from the original on 2007-01-02.
