= Trinity Buoy Wharf Drawing Prize =

British art prize

- Description: United Kingdom's leading award and longest-running annual open exhibition for contemporary drawing
- Country: United Kingdom

The Trinity Buoy Wharf Drawing Prize is the United Kingdom's leading award in contemporary drawing.

Initially awarded in 1991 as the Malvern Open Drawing Prize, it became the Cheltenham Open Drawing Competition in 1994, and then the Jerwood Drawing Prize from 2001 until 2017. It is claimed to be the largest and longest running annual open exhibition for drawing in the UK.

== Background ==
It was established by Malvern Drawing Associates in 1991 to promote excellence in contemporary drawing practice and moved to Cheltenham in 1994.

From 2001 until 2017 it was funded by the Jerwood Charitable Foundation and organised by Wimbledon College of Art. The exhibition is open to entry by all artists resident or domiciled in the United Kingdom. It takes place annually, and includes an exhibition of all the shortlisted drawings which then forms a touring exhibition.

The Trinity Buoy Wharf Trust, which since 1998 has used income from properties at Trinity Buoy Wharf in east London to fund arts projects, took over sponsorship of the Prize in 2018.

In 2004 approximately 2,000 entries were received. In 2011 the competition accepted approximately 3,500 entries. A first prize of £6,000 and a second prize of £3,000 were awarded. In addition there were two student awards, each with a £1,000 prize. In 2016 the first prize was £8,000 with a second prize of £5,000 and two runners up prizes of £2,000 each. In 2019, the first prize was £8,000; the runner-up received £5,000.

== Winners ==
Previous first prize winners include:

=== Malvern Open Drawing Prize ===
- 1991 – Clare Jarrett

=== Cheltenham Open Drawing Competition ===
- 1994 – Sharon Beavan
- 1995 –
- 1996 – Kenny Lowe
- 1997 – Rebecca Salter
- 1998 – Wynn Jones
- 1999 – Anna Mazzotta
- 2000 – David Connearn

=== Jerwood Drawing Prize ===
- 2001 – Kate Davis
- 2002 – Adam Dant
- 2003 – Paul Brandford for Snatch
- 2004 – Sarah Woodfine
- 2005 – Juliette Losq for We are the fiction of the vanished lives and buildings
- 2006 – Charlotte Hodes
- 2007 – Sophie Horton
- 2008 – Warren Baldwin
- 2009 – Mit Senoj (AKA Tim Jones)
- 2010 – Virginia Verran for her drawing Bolus-Space (signal)
- 2011 – Gary Lawrence for his drawing Homage to Anonymous
- 2012 – Karolina Glusiec for her film Velocity
- 2013 – Svetlana Fialova for her drawing Apocalypse (My Boyfriend Doesn’t Care)
- 2014 – Alison Carlier for her audio work Adjectives, lines and marks
- 2015 – Thomas Harrison
- 2016 – Solveig Settemsdal for her video, Singularity. A "temporal and sculptural process of drawing", it was the first video to win the prize.
- 2017 – Gary Lawrence. Second Prize Ana Mendes, Evelyn Williams Drawing Award Barbara Walker, Student prize Jade Montserrat

=== Trinity Buoy Wharf Drawing Prize ===
- 2018 – Caroline Burraway, for her charcoal drawing, Eden, The Jungle Calais 2016 (2017).
- 2019 – Alice Motte-Muñoz for her drawing, Reverie.
- 2020 – M.Lohrum for her performance drawing You are It. Second prize Nancy Haslam-Chance, Student award Ayeshah Zolghadr, Working Drawing award Ben Johnson, three Special Commendations to Frank Leuwer, James Robert Morrison, Isabel Rock.
- 2021 – Gary Lawrence for Ye Olde Keyhole Surgery (2020). Second Prize David Haines, Student Award Gabriela Adach, Working Drawing Award Zahra Akbari Baseri, Evelyn Williams Drawing Award Roland Hicks
- 2022 – Elisa Alaluusua for Unconceivable Line a single-channel video drawing (2022). Second Prize Aleksandra Czuja, Student Prize Kasia Depta-Garapich, Working Drawing Award Gemma Thompson.
- 2023 – Jeanette Barnes for New Battersea Tube Station & Developments (2023). Second Prize Victoria Hunter McKenzie, Student Award Peter Blodau, Working Drawing Award Ade Olaosebikan, Evelyn Williams Drawing Award Isabel Rock.
- 2024 – Max L Adams for Out of Round: An Abbreviated Outline of British Studio Pottery (2024). Second Prize Owen Johnson, Student Award Hyeyeon Chung, Working Drawing Award Emma Douglas.
- 2025 – Olivia Rowland for I am Destroy, second prize Eleanor Wood, Student Award Wei Wang, Working Drawing Award Kanto Ohara Maeda.

== See also ==
- Jerwood Painting Prize
- List of European art awards
