= Oakham School =

Public school in Oakham, Rutland, England

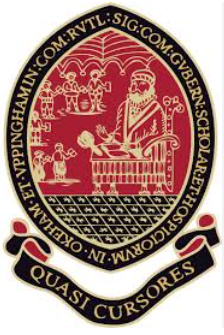

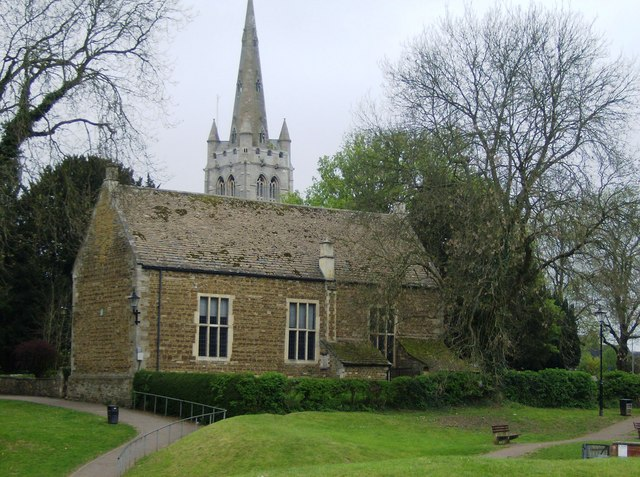

Location
- Market Place; Oakham, Rutland, LE15 6DT; England; 52.6704°N 0.7277°W

Information
- Type: Public school Private boarding and day school
- Motto: Latin: quasi cursores vitai lampada tradunt (Like runners, they pass on the torch of life)
- Religious affiliation: Church of England
- Established: 1584 (442 years ago)
- Founder: Robert Johnson
- Department for Education URN: 120322 Tables
- Chairman of trustees: Geraint Davies
- Head: Lucy Pearson
- Chaplain: Timothy Tregunno
- Staff: 160
- Gender: Coeducational
- Age: 11 to 18
- Enrolment: 1,082
- Houses: 16 day and boarding houses
- Colours: Red and black
- Alumni: Old Oakhamians
- School Seal: Latin: Sig Com Gubern Scholar et Hospiciorum in Okeham et Uppingham in Com Rutl; Common seal of the governors of the schools and hospitals of Oakham and Uppingham in the county of Rutland
- Website: http://www.oakham.rutland.sch.uk/

Oakham School is a public school (English fee-charging boarding and day school) in Oakham, Rutland, England.

It was founded in 1584 by Archdeacon Robert Johnson, along with the nearby Uppingham School. They share a badge design (and a strong rivalry), but Oakham's colours are black and red, whereas Uppingham's colours are blue and white.

Under its headmaster John Buchanan, in 1971 Oakham was the first boys' independent secondary school in Britain to accept both male and female pupils throughout the whole school rather than only in the sixth form. In 1995, it was the first British public school to establish an online presence.

== History ==
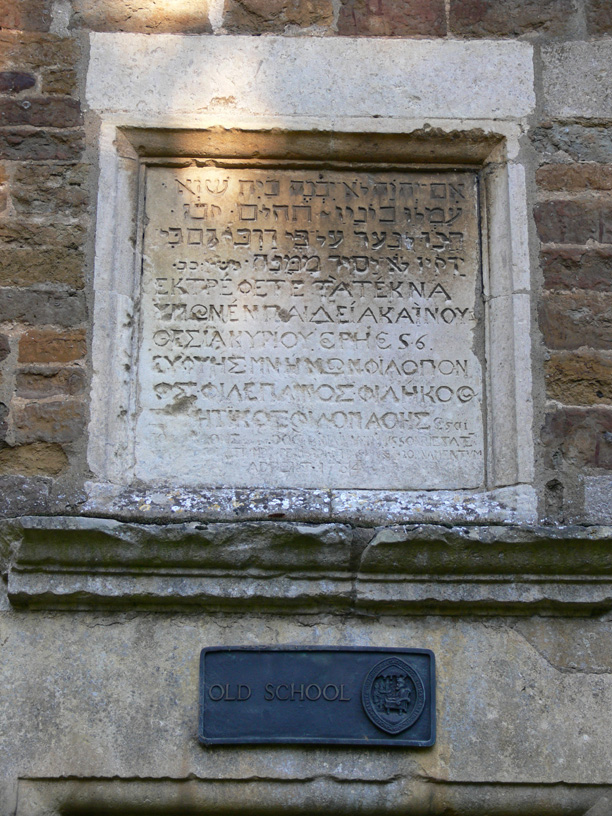
Inscription above the door of the Old School

Oakham School was founded in 1584 by Robert Johnson, Archdeacon of Leicester. Johnson used his income from his church offices to found charitable institutions, including the two free grammar schools at Oakham and Uppingham, in accordance with his Puritan Christianity.

According to Johnson's statutes for the school, "the schoolmaster shall teach all those grammar scholars that are brought up in Oakham, freely without pay, if their parents be poor and not able to pay, and keep them constantly to school." The master of the school was to teach Hebrew, Latin and Greek. Although the schooling was free, each permanent attendance entailed a family's loss of a source of income, so the very poor did not attend. The master could supplement his income of £24 per year by taking in boarders. Johnson's endowment of the school was confirmed by a royal charter that was granted by Queen Elizabeth I.

The original school-building was restored in the eighteenth century and remained the school's sole classroom for 300 years. In 1749 a case involving payment of rates recorded that "the school of Uppingham is not nor hath been of equal repute with that of Oakham". The headmastership of John Doncaster (1808–46), who had been a pupil at the school, advanced the school academically: "This was the man who returned to his old school at the age of thirty-six, with University honours and university experience, to give it fresh life, and to set a mark on it which it never quite lost". However, its enrolment remained below 50 pupils during the second half of the nineteenth century whilst its rival Uppingham flourished.

In 1869 Oakham was one of the founding members of the Headmasters' Conference (HMC). In 1875, as a result of the Endowed Schools Act 1869, there were just 2 day boys and 2 boarders in the school, and the exhausted headmaster, William Spicer Wood (1846–75), retired, only for his successor to last only three years before being dismissed.

All classes were still taught in the one room: that of the original old school, which still exists next to the parish church. Science and modern languages were added to the curriculum. The subjects examined for a scholarship within the school were English history (1066–1603), geography of the British Isles, English grammar, arithmetic, English composition and dictation. A more successful headmaster, E. V. Hodge, headmaster from 1879 to 1902, saw numbers increase, to 125 in 1896, with slightly more boarders than day boys. Then followed onto the scene three successful headmasters: Walter Lee Sargant (1902–29) under whom numbers rose to over 200 with consequent new buildings, Francis Cecil Doherty (1929–34), who went on to be headmaster of Lancing College, and Grosvenor Talbot Griffith (1935–57) who took the numbers to over 300, before the advent of John Buchanan.

However, the 125 of Hodge's leadership was not maintained, and by 1905 the enrolment had fallen back to 66. Sargant's response to the financial difficulties that were caused by this decline, namely to only 80 pupils when he commenced his headmastership, was to apply in 1910 for direct grant status, and to become in effect the boys' grammar school for Rutland at the same time as continuing as a public school for the boarders. New facilities for science teaching were created, boarding accommodation was improved with new building and extensions, and a new school house was built. Pupil numbers rose again, to 105 in 1910, and to 200 in 1923.

The Memorial Chapel was dedicated on 29 October 1925; it was built as a memorial to the 68 old boys and masters who were killed in the First World War. The Memorial Library was opened in 1955 by Prince Henry, Duke of Gloucester as a memorial to the 82 old boys who were killed in the Second World War.

John David Buchanan took over from Talbot Griffith in 1958. When the Circular 10/65 demanded comprehensivisation of maintained schools, of which Oakham was one as a direct-grant school for the Rutland dayboys, he and the Rutland Local Education Authority did not agree on the reorganisation of Rutland's schools, and as a result in 1970 the school (then 700 in size, all boys) reverted to full independence from the local authority. In 1971, Oakham admitted female pupils for the first time, with the intention from the beginning of being co-educational throughout. The school remains co-educational throughout its entire age range (10–18), with an approximately 50:50 split at all levels (c. 550 boys and 500 girls in 2011–12). There are an equal number of girls' houses (8) to boys' houses.

When Buchanan retired in 1977 the school was 950 in total size (c. 550 boys and 400 girls), and the next headmaster, Richard Bull (1977–84, before he went on to be headmaster of Rugby School, developed the co-education process, which was not completed until 1990 during the headmastership of Graham Smallbone (1985–96) when equality of numbers was attained. When Tony Little, later headmaster of Eton College, took over in 1996 there were 528 boys and 510 girls, and the school was evenly divided between boarders and day pupils, including "day boarders" from the age of 13 years and "transitional boarders" between the ages of 10 and 13 years.

In 1981, the school was the subject of an action brought by Novello & Co and the Music Publishers Association (UK) for photocopying sheet-music for Christmas carols. This was the first case of its kind in the UK. The High Court settlement ordered the school to pay £4250 in damages plus costs.

In 1984 the quatercentenary of the school was celebrated by a visit from Queen Elizabeth II and Prince Philip, Duke of Edinburgh.

In 2005 Oakham School was one of fifty independent schools found guilty of running an illegal price-fixing cartel which had allowed them to drive up fees for thousands of parents. Each school was required to pay a nominal penalty of £10,000 and all agreed to make ex-gratia payments totalling three million pounds into a trust designed to benefit pupils who attended the schools during the period in respect of which fee information was shared.

== Lower school ==
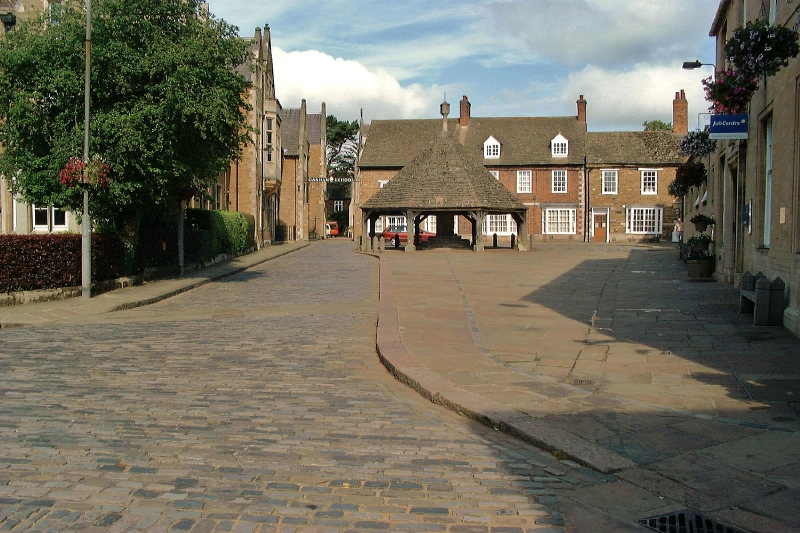
School entrance in Oakham Market Place

The current school set-up comprises three distinct "levels" of education. The lower school, for children aged 10–13, is also known as "Jerwoods" after the benefactor Old Oakhamian John Jerwood. The buildings that comprise it mostly date back to the early 1970s, when the four houses that comprise the area were established, but the main building, now part of the boys' boarding site known as 'Hodges', was the old vicarage, which was bought by the school in 1870. The girls' boarding site, formally Lincoln house, is in a round building to the west. Now the two Houses have both day and boarding students, Sargants for boys and Ancaster for girls, are found on different floors of the main eastern building, which also houses all seven classrooms which are not used anymore . During their time in the lower school, pupils study all of the core subjects (mathematics, English, science, history and geography) as well as French and either German or Spanish, religious education, Latin, Design & Technology and ICT. There is also a carousel system of creative and performing arts courses, which include textiles, 2D art and sculpture, and a separate carousel for drama and dance, and pupils take part in a physical education scheme of swimming and general ball skills.

== Middle school ==
All pupils study English (language and literature), mathematics, a dual-award science course, and a foreign language (French, German or Spanish) to GCSE, as well as at least two of history, geography and RP (Religion & Philosophy). Pupils then choose two subjects from a selection, including a second foreign language, drama and theatre studies, Textiles, Painting, Sculpture, Design & Technology, sports science and a combined Greek and Latin course.

There are ten houses in the middle school, six boarding and four day houses, split evenly between boys and girls. The day houses are located at the north end of campus, in the grounds of the former Oakham Workhouse, later Catmose Vale Hospital. The main building houses the two girls' houses, Gunthorpe and Hambleton, while the boys' houses, Barrow and Clipsham, are in a newer house alongside. The Girls Full-boarding houses, Rushbrokes and Buchanans, are just south of the Schanschieff day site. The Girls transitional boarding house, Stevens, is located alongside the boys counterpart, Wharflands, in the center of the campus. The boys full-boarding houses Chapmans and Haywoods are on Kilburn road ( the western-most part of the campus)

== Upper school ==
Oakham offers both the International Baccalaureate (IB) and AS/A2 levels.

=== AS/A2 levels ===
Most students take four subjects at AS Level and continue to A2 level in at least three of those subjects.

=== International Baccalaureate (IB) ===
In the upper school, all students take six subjects.

In 2019, 49.34% of pupils scored A*-A for their A-Levels examination, whereas 51.88% scored A*-A for their GCSEs. The average IB score for students in 2019 was 36.7.

== Sport ==
Oakham offers a range of sports to its pupils; main sports for boys are rugby (Daily Mail champions twice), hockey, cricket and athletics, and for girls are hockey, netball, tennis and athletics. The school has won the Ashburton Shield in shooting on three occasions. OO RSF Shouler won the Queens Prize at the imperial meeting in 2021 Sovereign's Prize.

The school offers, both the Combined Cadet Force and The Duke of Edinburgh's Award; in the latter it has gained awards at the three levels of bronze, silver and gold. In November 2000 the Duke of Edinburgh came to the school to present the 1000th Gold Award.

Oakham have won the National Schools cup final in rugby three times, 2002, 2003, and 2023.

Prior to 2003 Leicestershire County Cricket Club occasionally played games on the school grounds.

== Old Oakhamians ==
For a list of notable alumni, see List of Old Oakhamians.

== See also ==
- W. L. Sargant, The Book of Oakham School (1928)
- J. L. Barber, The Story of Oakham School (1984) (ISBN 0 905837 185)
- J. D. Buchanan, Operation Oakham (1984) ISBN 0-905837-14-2)
- Brian Needham, Oakham School - The Continuing Story - unpublished, available for researchers only
- Brian Needham, various internal booklets (Notable Old Oakhamians, Old Oakhamian Obituaries, Old Oakhamian Military War Service, History of OTC / JTC / CCF at Oakham, The Duke of Edinburgh's Award at Oakham, Overseas Expeditions, Scouting and Guiding at Oakham, Cricket / Rugby / Hockey / Netball Statistical Histories, Oakham School and the Boer War, Oakham School and the Great War, Oakham School and the Second World War)
