= Frances Aviva Blane =

English painter

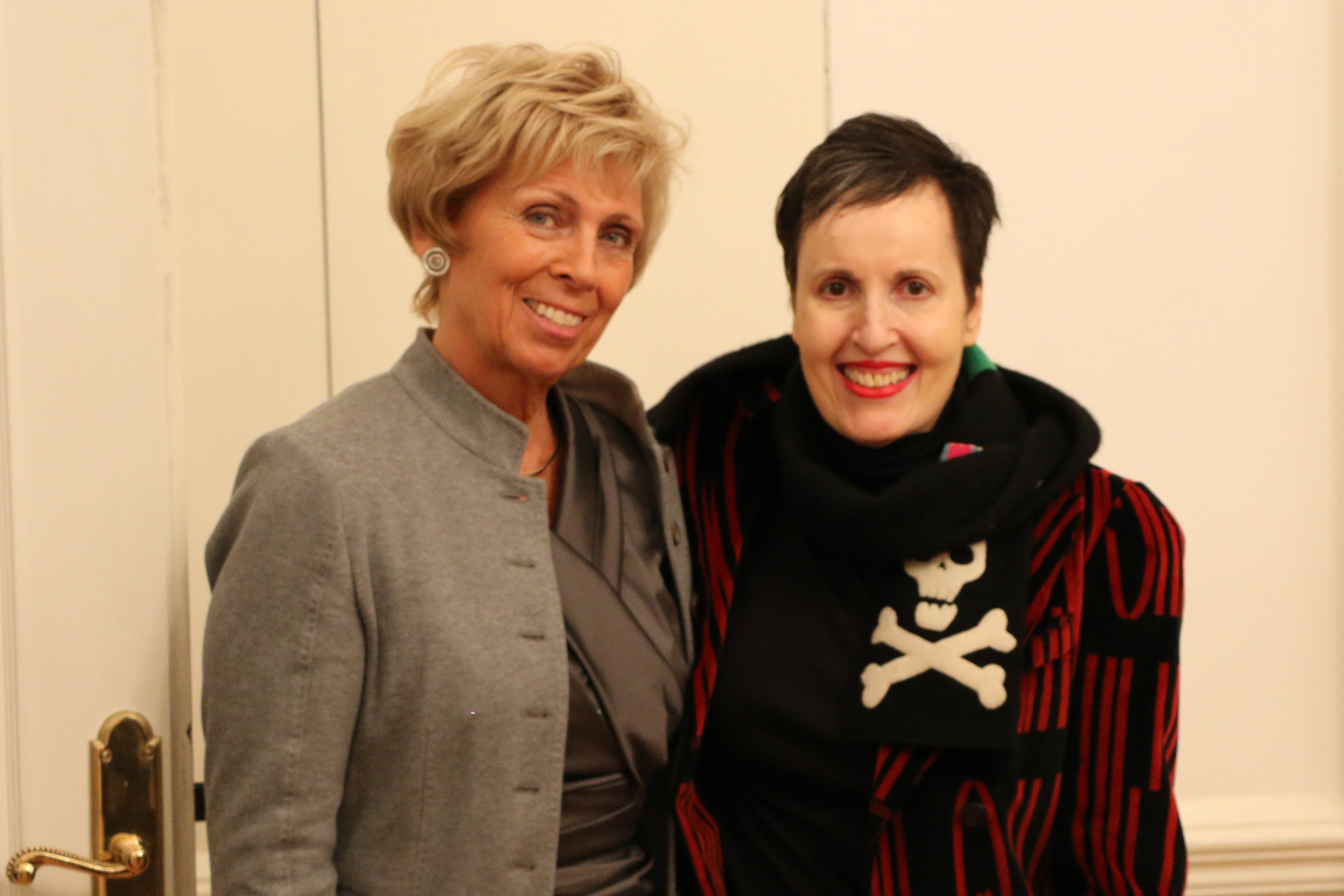
Frances Blane (right) with Marliese Heimann-Ammon

Frances Aviva Blane (née Sternberg), is a British abstract painter who works in the Expressionist tradition. Her subject matter is the disintegration of paint and personality. Although her paintings are mainly non-referential, her drawings are often portraits of heads.

She has exhibited alongside Louise Bourgeois, Frank Auerbach, Basil Beattie and John McLean in Europe, Japan, Australia and the UK.

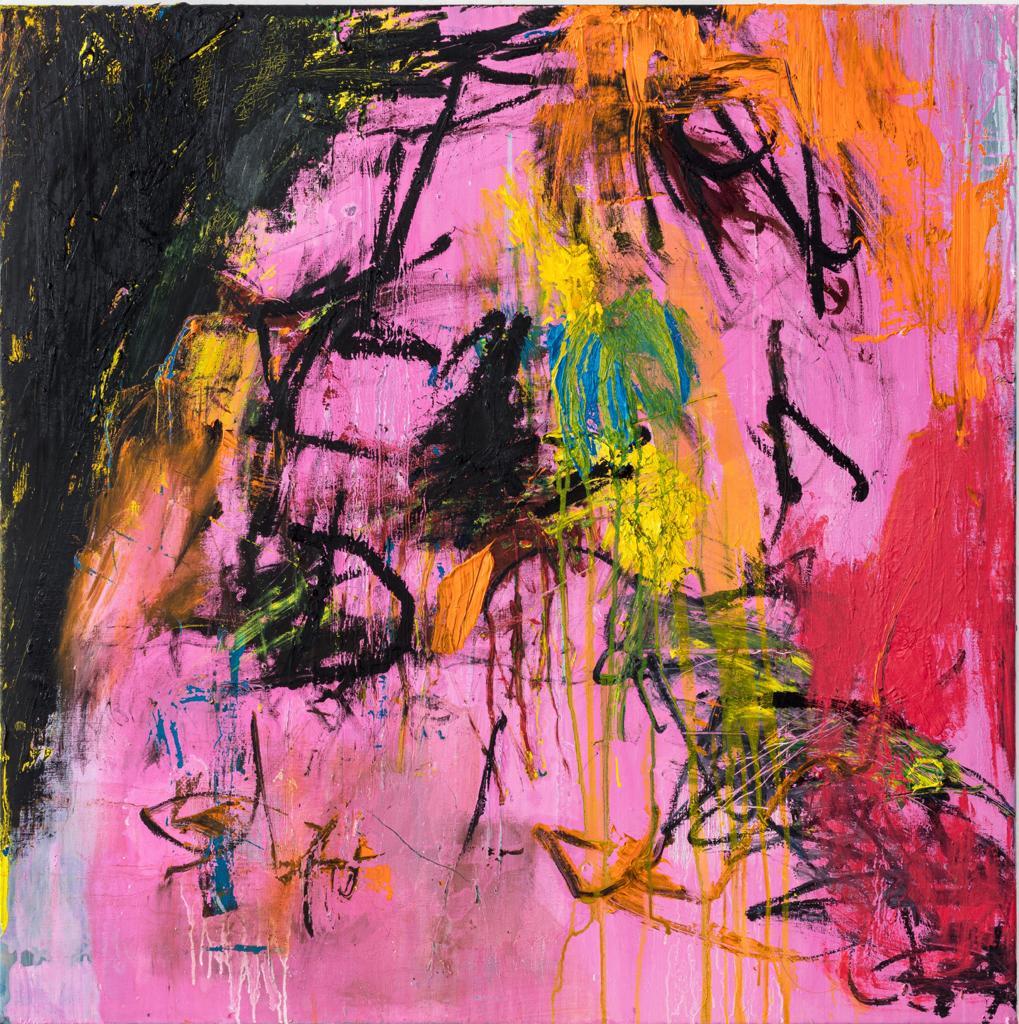
Portrait (2020) by Frances Aviva Blane oil and linen 90x90 cm. Photographer Richard Ivey

== Education ==
Blane studied at Chelsea School of Art (1988), Byam Shaw School of Painting and Drawing (1991) and the Slade School of Fine Art, London (1993).

== Films ==
- If the Answer is No... Then Actually Yes (2026) directed by Penny Woolcock, a conversation between Susie Orbach, Anna McNay, Corinna Lotz and Frances Aviva Blane.
- Portrait (2024) directed by Penny Woolcock, is a conversation between Susie Orbach and Frances Aviva Blane.
- Who is Frances Aviva Blane? (2020) directed by Penny Woolcock, camera Leo Regan, editing Alex Fry
- Two Metres Apart with Susie Orbach (2020) directed by Penny Woolcock.

== Books ==
- Impossible (2026). Paintings and works on paper by Frances Aviva Blane with essays by Corrina Lotz and Manick Govinda.
- Yes! (2025). Paintings and works on paper by Frances Aviva Blane with essays by Corrina Lotz and Manick Govinda.
- Me Me Me! (2024) Paintings and drawings by Frances Aviva Blane with essay by Anna McNay.
- Portrait (2024). Paintings and drawings by Frances Aviva Blane with essays by Susie Orbach and Penny Woolcock.
- Dark (2023). Paintings and drawings by Frances Aviva Blane with essay by Anna McNay.
- On Paint (2022). A book of paintings and drawings by Frances Aviva Blane with essay by Sacha Craddock.
- August (2022). Paintings and drawings by Frances Aviva Blane with essay by Susie Orbach.
- Basil Beattie and Frances Aviva Blane 2021 (2021). A book documenting a show by Blane and Beattie at ecArtspace with essays by Sue Hubbard and Manick Govinda.
- Frances (2021) by Susie Orbach, Eddy Frankel and Corinna Lotz.
- COVID (2020) by Susie Orbach and Frances Aviva Blane – a book of paintings and drawings made by Blane during the first COVID-19 lockdown with an essay by Susie Orbach.
- Who is Frances Aviva Blane? (2020) Blane, Orbach, Woolcock. A book accompanying the film of the same name directed by Penny Woolcock.
- FAB (2019) by Frances Aviva Blane with introduction by Susie Orbach.
- More. Works on Paper by Frances Aviva Blane with essay by Mark Gisbourne was published by Starmount Publications in January 2018.
- Embassy by Frances Aviva Blane. A book of paintings and drawings chronicling Blane's exhibition at the German Embassy London with introduction by Tess Jaray was published by Starmount Publications in 2017.
- Nothing by Frances Aviva Blane, a book of paintings and works on paper with a catalogue essay by Diana Souhami was published by Starmount Publications in 2015.

== Exhibitions ==
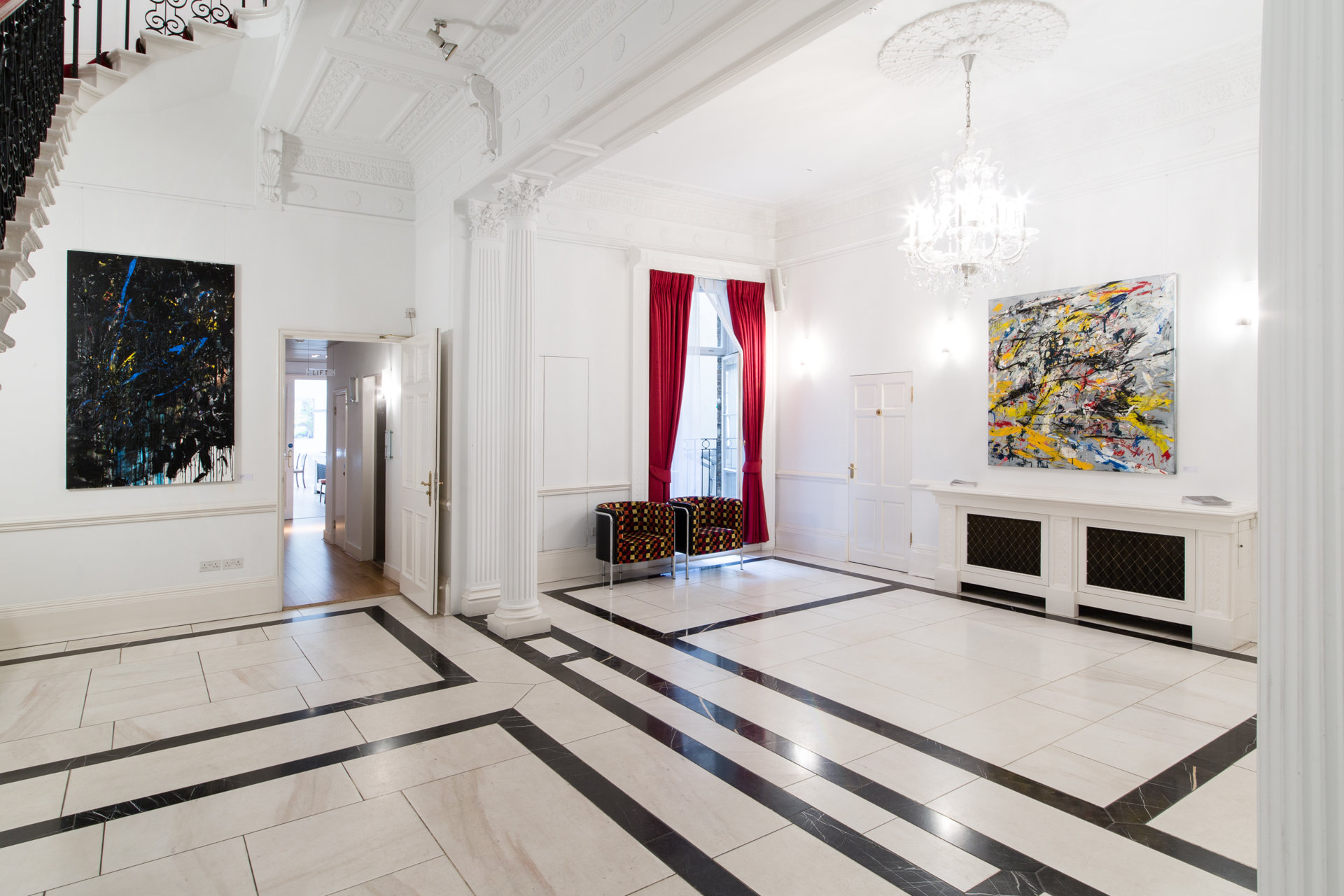
Installation view (2016) of Frances Aviva Blane show Two Faces at the German Ambassador's Residence, London

Blane's first show in London was curated by Andrew Mummery, a British gallerist. She is also an award-winner of the Jerwood Drawing Prize (1999) and took part in their exhibition Drawing Breath, an anniversary show.

Blane has been included in many group shows including Chora (London and touring the UK) curated by art critic Sue Hubbard and Women's Contemporary Self Portraits at the Usher Gallery (Lincoln and touring). Blane also showed at the Annely Juda Gallery in the exhibition Annely Juda – A Celebration. She has had two-handed exhibitions with Basil Beattie and John Mclean, both prominent British abstract painters.

She was sponsored by the British Council and the Goethe Institut to take part in a painting swap with German artists. She has also exhibited at The Architectural Biennale in Clerkenwell in 2004 and at Our Most Holy Redeemer Church in Exmouth Market.

=== Solo shows ===
- Impossible. Greatorex Street Gallery, London (2026)
- Me me me! Zuleika Gallery, Woodstock, Oxford (2024)
- Disturb Shippon Gallery, Chardstock, Axminster, Devon (2024)
- On Paint, ecArtspace.com, London 2022
- Frances Aviva Blane, The Brave Truth, at Zuleika Gallery, Oxfordshire, UK, November 2022
- Frances Aviva Blane, Fired with Claudia Clare, Gallery 286, London, October 2022
- Frances Aviva Blane, Dark, De Queeste Kunstkamers, Abele/Watou, Belgium from 11 November to 9 December 2018
- Blane. Broken Heads, Broken Paint, 12 Star Gallery at Europe House, London 2018
- Two Faces, a show of work by Frances Aviva Blane, The German Ambassador's Residence, London, 2016 – 2017
- Deconstruct, Frances Aviva Blane shown alongside exhibitions of Francis Bacon and Louise Bourgeois, De Queeste Kunstkamers, Abele/Watou, Belgium, 2014
- Big Black Paintings, Bay Hall, King's College London, 2014
- Frances Aviva Blane, Paintings & Drawings, De Queeste Kunstkamers, Abele/Watou, Belgium, 2013
- Paintings and Works on Paper, Quest 21, Brussels, 2011
- Portrait/Painting, Shillam and Smith3 London, 2006
- Prime Time: Painting, Frances Aviva Blane – paintings & drawings at Galerie Seitz & Partner, Berlin, 2006
- Paintings in The Church of Our Most Holy Redeemer, ecArtspace, Exmouth Market, London, 2004
- Frances Aviva Blane Paintings and Drawings ecArtspace in conjunction with London Architecture Biennale, St John's Street EC1, 2004
- Delinquent Paintings, ecArtspace, 2001
- Berry House Solo x 9: artists in Clerkenwell – including Susan Hiller, 1998
- Frances Aviva Blane Drawing, Shillam Smith 3, 1997
- F Blane Only, curated by Andrew Mummery, London, 1996
- Curwen Gallery, London, curated by Andrew Mummery, 1995

=== Group shows ===
- Danger! New works by Frances Aviva Blane and Claudia Clare, Peggy Jay Gallery, Burgh House, London 2026
- Het Festijn. New works by Frances Aviva Blane, Eleanor Havsteen-Franklin, Evelien Hiele, Thomas Lohmann and Dimitri Kolibarov, De Queeste Art, Belgium 2024
- An Echo in Time. Paintings and works on paper by Frances Aviva Blane, De Queeste Art, Abele/Watou and at the group show in Watou, Belgium 2024
- Curated at Dorfold Hall – British art then and now. A group show at Zuleika Gallery, Oxfordshire, UK, December 2023
- Salon van de Tekening. A group show with Frank Auerbach, George Grosz and Erich Heckel. De Queeste Kunstkamers, Abele/Watou Belgium, March 2023
- Basil Beattie + Frances Blane drawings and paintings, (20th anniversary show), ecArtspace, Burgh House, London, 2022
- Trinity Buoy Wharf Drawing Prize, London, 2021
- Moi et Les Autres. A group show with Daniel Enkaoua Etc. De Queeste Kunstkamers Abele/Watou Belgium, 2021
- Ruth Borchard Collection, The Self Portrait Prize, 2021
- Art from The Heart, Zuleika Gallery Exhibition in aid of Maggies Cancer Centre with Anish Kapoor, Trevor Sutton and Claudia Clare, 2021
- Sea of Change with Stockwell and Jason Oddy online at www.ecartspace.com and Lemnos Greece, 2021
- Fragmented, with Claudia Clare, Zuleika Gallery, London SW1, 2020
- Distancing’, with Basil Beattie, Susan Stockwell, Dryden Goodwin, ecArtspace online, 2020
- The Desire Of Looking, with Daniel Enkaoua, Marcelle Hanselaar, De Queeste Kunstkamers Abele/Watou Belgium, 2020
- Age is Just a Number, Summer Show at Zuleika Gallery, London SW1, 2019
- Ikonoclash #01 including Anton Kannemeyer and Marcelle Hanselaar, De Queeste Kunstamers, Abele/Watou Belgium, 2019
- Abstract Allies including Trevor Sutton, Nigel Hall at Zuleika Gallery, London SW1, 2019
- John Moores Painting Prize, Walker Gallery, Liverpool, 2018
- Human, The German Embassy, London, October 2017
- Creekside Open 2017 selected by Jordan Baseman
- Liquid Thought, with Daniel Enkaoua and Chris Stevens, De Queeste Kunstkamers, Abele/Watou, Belgium, 2016
- Impact, with Louise Bourgeois, Marthe Zink, De Queeste Kunstkamers, Abele/Watou, Belgium, 2016
- Jerwood Drawing Prize 2015 – 2016. London and UK tour
- De Vage Grens, with Frank Auerbach, Reniere&Depla, etc. De Queeste Kunstkamers, Abele/Watou, Belgium, 2015
- Critics Circle, Selector Corinna Lotz, Mall Galleries, London, 2013
- Drawing Breath, Jerwood Anniversary Exhibition, London, Sydney, Bristol, 2006 – 2008
- Annely Juda A Celebration. Annely Juda Fine Art, London, 2007
- Marlborough Fine Art, The London Print Fair, 2006
- Blind Art, Royal Cornwall Museum, Truro, 2005
- Sense and Sensuality, Blind Art, London, New York, Leicester, 2006
- Blind Art, Royal College of Art, London, 2005
- Weiss zieht und gewinnt, Galerie Seitz & Partners, Berlin, 2005
- Small is Beautiful, Flowers Central, London, 2004
- Very British?, Arbeiten von Britschen Kunstlerinnen with Tacita Dean, Mike Silva, Die Drostei, Pinneberg, 2004
- The Discerning Eye, Mall Galleries London, 2004
- Art Works in Mental Health, Royal College of Art, London, touring Cardiff, Birmingham, Edinburgh, Manchester, 2003
- Dialogue with Nigel Ellis, ecArtspace London, 2002
- Absolut Secret, Royal College of Art, London, 2002 − 2004, 2006 − 2010
- Drawings for All, Gainsborough's House, Suffolk, 2002
- The Contemporary Art Society, Art Futures, 2002
- German and English Painting Swap, Berlin/London, sponsored by the British Council and Goethe institut, 2002
- Drawing – Frances Aviva Blane with Basil Beattie, ecArtspace, London, 2001
- Galerie Stuhler, Berlin, 2000, 2001
- Jerwood Open Drawing Show award winner touring Berlin and Ghent, 2000
- Before, Now and After with Helen Sears and Sheila Gaffney, Berlin and London, 2000
- Painting with John Mclean, 53–54 St John's Square, London, 2000
- Chora, curated by Sue Hubbard, London and touring, 1999–2000
- The Cheltenham Open Drawing Show, 1999
- Small is Beautiful, Flowers Gallery East, 1999–2003
- In The Looking Glass, women contemporary self-portraits, Usher Gallery Lincoln and touring, 1996
- The London Group Biennial exhibition, Barbican Centre, 1995
- Royal Academy of Art, Summer Exhibition, 1995
- Into the Nineties, Pick of the Postgraduates, showcase of new artists, Mall Galleries, 1993

== Awards ==
- A Jerwood Drawing Award, 1999
- Mid-America ART Alliance Fellowship for Visual Arts, 1998
- Residency at Djerassi Artists' Foundation, California, 1998
- Graham Hamilton Drawing Prize, 1991
