= EXR =

EXR may refer to:

- EXR (app), an indoor rowing application
- ExR, an English musical duo
- EXR (clothing), a South Korean clothing company
- Exeter station (New Hampshire), a train station
- Essex Road railway station, London, UK
- OpenEXR, an image file format
- Extra Space Storage (NYSE symbol EXR)
