= Dubzy =

English grime MC, actor and entrepreneur

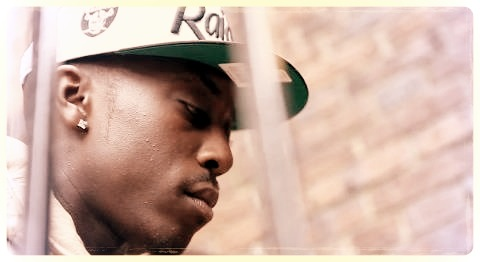
Dubzy shooting for GRM Daily in 2014.

Jesse James, better known by his stage name Dubzy, is an English grime MC, actor and entrepreneur. He is the co-founder of music collective and fashion label Snazz. Since 2022, he has been in a distribution agreement with Universal Music.

He won Red Bull's 2016 Grime-a-Side championship with the Derby team and finished second in UK Grime's best MC's of 2016.

In November 2016, Dubzy signed a publishing deal with Sony ATV and Reprezent for a single alongside fellow grime artists Kannan & Eyez entitled 'Highs & Lows'.

== Career ==
Dubzy started out producing on PlayStation's Music 2000 music creation program at the age of 12 before moving on to music production on FL Studio as well as picking up rapping in his early teens. At 15, he released his first LP entitled 'On Music Daily: Vol. 1'. James released a series of mixtapes between 2012 and 2014 including Apples & Blackberrys and Beat Is My Counsellor, the latter of which spent three consecutive months in Audiomack's top 5 most downloaded mixtapes/albums in 2012. In 2014, he released Gift of the Gab; the CD features collaborations with Bloodline recording artist Paper Pabs as well as tracks with Roll Deep MC Trim.

In 2015, BBC Radio 1 DJ Charlie Sloth selected Dubzy as one of his three 'MC's to watch in 2016' and praised Snazz headwear in a Fire in the Booth workshop episode of his live prime-time radio show. An invitation from Tim Westwood to perform a Crib Session on Capital Xtra alongside fellow Grime artist Eyez followed. The two also performed at every leg of the MOBO Awards' Unsung tour and released a single Let's Play a Game in the same period. Dubzy has featured on a number of singles by other artists including Hear Me which debuted on Sian Anderson's BBC 1xtra show and features him alongside Roll Deep's Manga, Rukus, Kobi Onyame and Eyez. Dubzy also collaborated with Z Dot, Mez, Snowy, Row-d & Eyez on 'Raise The Bar' single last year.

On 1 January 2016, Dubzy released single "Hungry For Dis" alongside Eyez and Kannan. He became the face of high street retailer Footasylum's #WeAreFootasylum campaign.

In October 2016, Dubzy signed a publishing deal with Sony ATV and Reprezent for a single entitled 'Highs and Lows'. He won Red Bull's Grime-a-Side 2016 national championship for the Derby team, the smallest team/city in the competition.
