= FYO (EP) =

EP by Avelino
- Released: 7 April 2016
- Genre: UK rap; experimental hip hop
- Length: 17:22 (standard); 25:42 (deluxe)
- Label: OddChild Music; More Music Records
- Producer: Raf Riley

Avelino chronology
Young Fire, Old Flame (2015)	FYO (2016)	No Bullshit (2017)

Singles from FYO
- 1. "Welcome to the Future" Released: 31 March 2016; 2. "FYO" Released: 14 April 2016

FYO (an acronym for Fuck Your Opinion) is the debut extended play (EP) by English rapper Avelino. It was produced in its entirety by Raf Riley, and released for free download through OddChild Music, on 7 April 2016. The project was also released onto the iTunes Store on 11 April 2016, accompanied by two bonus tracks. It spawned one single; "Welcome to the Future", which premiered on 31 March 2016, a week before the rest of the project.

The project has received considerable support from BBC Radio 1 and 1Xtra; "Youniverse" has been played by MistaJam, and the title track has been played by Annie Mac, DJ Target and Charlie Sloth. The project also topped Semtex's Mixtape Top 5 chart, and "Welcome to the Future" and "Rich Soul" both received airplay on his 1Xtra show. Numerous songs from the project also received airplay on Manny Norte's Capital XTRA show, and Mally's Reprezent show. "FYO" was added to the Reprezent B-list playlist.

"FYO" was released as the project's second single, with a video released to YouTube on 14 April 2016. The track's production was praised by Grant Brydon of RWD as being "beautifully jarring", and by FACT as being "ribcage-quakingly bassy". Avelino told FACT that the video was "minimal [...] in a sense of one location, one setting, one room", as this allows listeners to "focus on what [he's] really saying on the record."

== Track listing ==
All tracks produced by Raf Riley.

Digital download
No.	Title	Length
1.	"Rich Soul"	2:22
2.	"Welcome to the Future"	3:39
3.	"FYO"	2:56
4.	"What Do They Know?" (featuring Eclectic and MC Neat)	4:19
5.	"Youniverse"	4:07
Total length:		17:22

digital bonus tracks
No.	Title	Length
6.	"Way Up"	4:26
7.	"Okay Mama" (featuring Daecolm)	3:54
Total length:		25:42
