= Penny Woolcock =

Argentine filmmaker

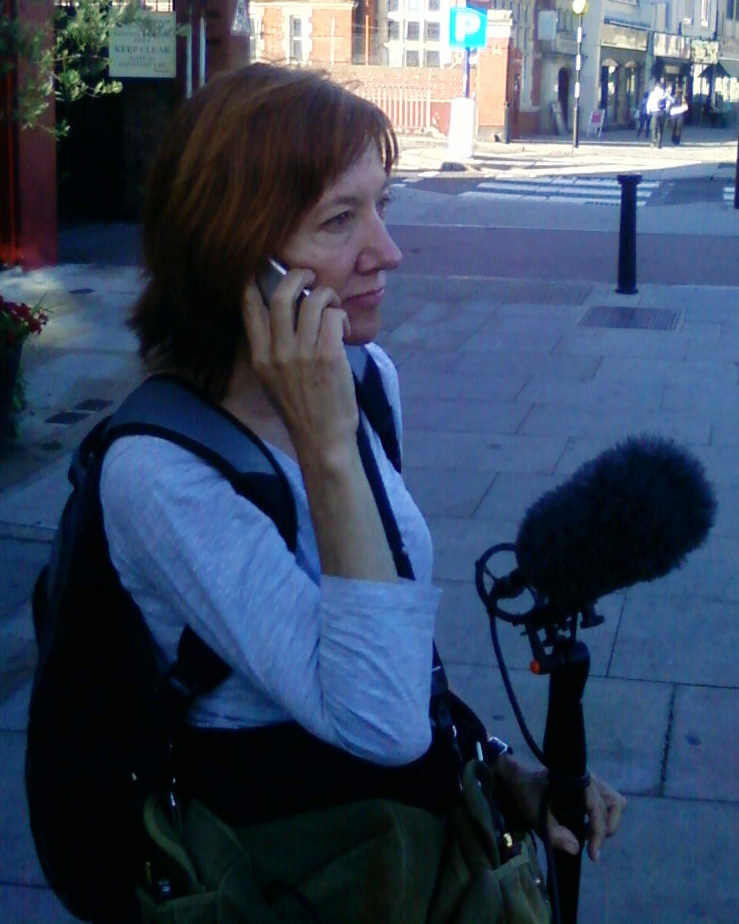
- Woolcock in 2008
- Born: 1 January 1950 (age 76); Buenos Aires, Argentina
- Occupations: Screenwriter, film director, opera director, screenwriter
- Years active: 1980s–present

Penny Woolcock (born 1 January 1950) is an Argentine filmmaker, opera director, and screenwriter.

== Early life ==
Penny Woolcock was born in Argentina and raised in a British community. In 1967, she performed in a play called "Liberty and other Intoxications", which was about dictatorship in Argentina; she was briefly arrested as a result. Her parents wanted to send her to Europe for safety; instead she fled to Spain with a man from the theatre group and had a baby in Barcelona.

In 1970, she moved to Oxford, England, as a single mother. There, she educated herself in the arts by visiting Modern Art Oxford. She did factory work and other jobs. In her thirties, she enrolled in a filmmakers' workshop, borrowed some film-making equipment and sold the resulting feature to the BBC. She was then hired as a director and editor of a current affairs program in Newcastle and subsequently went on to feature making.

== Career ==
Her first feature as a writer and director was Women in Tropical Places in 1989. Since then she has directed and written numerous documentary and feature films, for television and screen. She adapted and directed Macbeth on the Estate in 1997. As with her earlier film Shakespeare on the Estate (made with Michael Bogdanov), African-Caribbean people living in tower blocks in Ladywood, Birmingham were revealed to have a natural affinity with Shakespearean language and great skill at making Shakespeare relevant to present-day inner-city life.

Her breakthrough film was Tina Goes Shopping which was a collaborative piece with the real residents of the Gipton estates in Leeds, and which forms part one of what is now known as the Tina Trilogy (along with Tina takes a Break and the feature film Mischief Night). As well as starring in the Tina Trilogy, people from the estate (including Kelli Hollis) went on to appear in other TV and feature films, a social action feature of much of Woolcock's work. She has provided informal support to many people she has encountered whilst making documentaries and has tried to have social impacts over and above the making of her films. In Birmingham she was involved in helping to bring about a gangland truce after the making of the movie 1 Day and the documentary One Mile Away (both of which illustrated gangland "postcode wars"). She is part of a social enterprise with Dylan Duffus, Shabba Thompson and other ex-gang members trying to bring about change in parts of Birmingham affected by gang violence.

In 2013, Woolcock released a new documentary, Storyville: From the Sea to the Land Beyond - Britain's Coast on Film, which was broadcast on the BBC. Based on archive movie footage from early cinematography to recent times it illustrated working-class life in the 20th century, with an original soundtrack by British indie-rock band Sea Power. It has since been performed at the BFI Southbank, Latitude Festival, Sundance London, at Doc/Fest 2013, and under the hull of the Cutty Sark.

In 2014, she directed a documentary for Channel 4 called Going to the Dogs, investigating inner city dog fighting in the UK. She is currently the executive director of Ackley Bridge, a television series broadcast on Channel 4.

In 2020, she directed a documentary called Who is Frances Aviva Blane? a profile of the artist in lockdown (camera Leo Regan, editing Alex Fry).
In 2020, she directed a documentary entitled Two Metres Apart, a short film about the artist Frances Aviva Blane featuring psychotherapist and author Susie Orbach, (camera Leo Regan, editing Alex Fry).

== Opera ==
Woolcock's operas include a production of John Adams' Doctor Atomic which she directed for the Metropolitan Opera's 2008–2009 season. She had previously filmed Adams' The Death of Klinghoffer as a feature film. In 2014, she staged Bizet's The Pearl Fishers at English National Opera in London (English translation version), then recreated it in a highly acclaimed French version at The Metropolitan Opera in January 2016.

In 2016, she was invited by Streetwise Opera to direct a production of the Bach St Matthew Passion, performed predominantly by homeless people. Sir James MacMillan composed a new finale for the occasion, which was broadcast on BBC4 on Sunday 27 March 2016.

== Notes ==
- Katrina Ames, "The Surprising Career of Penny Woolcock," Opera News, October 2008, pp 38–39
