= Raf Riley =

- Also known as: The Grand Spectacular; Sabotage Party
- Born: Rafael Nathan Greifer; February 8, 1992 (age 34)
- Origin: North London
- Genres: Trap; dubstep; grime
- Instruments: Vocals; keyboard; drums; bass guitar; synthesizer
- Years active: 2011–present
- Labels: OddChild Music; Mad Decent; Slimkat Records
- Member of: ExR

Rafael Nathan Greifer, better known by his stage name Raf Riley, is a record producer and artist from North London. He was formerly a member of ExR alongside Etta Bond, and is signed to OddChild Music and has released on Diplo's Mad Decent label. ExR released two EPs: Emergency Room and Meds. He released his own EP titled Now That's What I Call Gangster Beats!! in January 2013. Riley is also known for his comedy production: alongside Reuben "Dangerman" Dangoor, Riley is one half of the Grand Spectacular. Their 2010 single "Being A Dickhead's Cool" became a viral video, receiving over thirteen million YouTube views. Riley and Dangerman are also part of the comedy rap trio Sabotage Party alongside Ray Knotts, in which he raps as well as produces. Dangerman also designs and directs all OddChild Music artwork and ExR videos.

Raf Riley has worked with many artists including Professor Green, Labrinth, Diplo, Naughty Boy, Dr. Luke and Mike Skinner. Riley has had cuts with Elliphant, Skepta and has remixed for Sigma, Conor Maynard and Plan B.

== Discography ==
=== EPs ===
Year	Album	Label
2012	Dog Unit	Mad Decent
2012	Emergency Room (with Etta Bond)	OddChild Music
2013	Now That's What I Call Gangster Beats!!	OddChild Music
2013	Meds (with Etta Bond)	OddChild Music
2017	Sass Pancakes (with Ashnikko)	Parlophone

=== Singles ===
==== As lead artist ====
Year	Song
2013	"Goblinz (The Wake)"
2013	"Buckshot"
2014	"The Funeral" (with Etta Bond)
2014	"Yo Rudeboy!!"
2014	"Ammunition"
2014	"King Richard's Revenge"
2014	"COP KILLA 2k15"
2015	"Hiding Place"
2015	"Summer" (featuring Etta Bond, Avelino and Dun D)
2015	"Bitches (Want It)" (featuring JenayFaith, Avelino, Ashnikko, Etta Bond and Dun D)
2015	"Never Did" (with Etta Bond featuring A2)
2015	"Bad or Not"
2016	"Shake Your Anus"

==== As the Grand Spectacular ====
Year	Song
2010	"Being A Dickhead's Cool"

==== As Sabotage Party ====
Year	Song
2013	"Silly Drake Noise"

=== Production credits ===
Year	Song	Release	Label
2011	"Tear it All Down" (Mz. Bratt)	Non-album single	Warner
2012	"Love Cards" (Devlin featuring Etta Bond)	A Moving Picture	Island
2012	"Under the Knife" (Labrinth featuring Etta Bond)	Atomic	OddChild Music
2013	"Free Weed for Single Mothers" (Lunar C)	Good Times & Dead Brain Cells	Insanity
2013	"Yippy Yay Yippy Yo" (Lady Leshurr)	Mona Leshurr	N/A
2014	"Wetter Than Tsunami" (RiFF RAFF)	NEON iCON	Mad Decent
2014	"Everything 4 U" (Elliphant)	Look Like You Love It	Mad Decent
2014	"Mark Your Territory" (Etta Bond)	#CoolUrbanNewTalent	OddChild Music
2014	"In the Morning" (Etta Bond)	#CoolUrbanNewTalent	OddChild Music
2014	"King to Be" (Etta Bond)	#CoolUrbanNewTalent	OddChild Music
2014	"Bubble" (Etta Bond featuring Delilah)	#CoolUrbanNewTalent	OddChild Music
2014	"High Wire" (Sinead Harnett)	N.O.W EP	Virgin EMI
2015	"The Fame" (Avelino) (co-produced by AceKeyz)	#NextGen10	GRM Daily
2015	"BodyRock" (Bluey Robinson)	The Cool EP	N/A
2015	"In a Rave" (Etta Bond x Raf Riley)	Ralph Hardy Presents: Growing Pains	NANG
2016	"Rich Soul" (Avelino)	FYO	OddChild Music
2016	"Welcome 2 The Future" (Avelino)	FYO	OddChild Music
2016	"FYO" (Avelino)	FYO	OddChild Music
2016	"What Do They Know" (Avelino featuring Eclectic and MC Neat)	FYO	OddChild Music
2016	"Youniverse" (Avelino)	FYO	OddChild Music

=== Remixes ===
Year	Song	Artist
2012	"Last Time"	Labrinth
2012	"Climax"	Usher
2012	"Treatment" (with Etta Bond)	Labrinth
2013	"Playing with Fire" (with Etta Bond)	Plan B featuring Labrinth
2013	"Overload"	Random Impulse
2013	"Are You Getting Enough?"	Professor Green featuring Miles Kane
2013	"Lifted"	Naughty Boy featuring Emeli Sandé
2013	"Year Round Summer"	Lolo
2013	"R U Crazy"	Conor Maynard
2013	"You're Nobody 'til Somebody Loves You" (featuring Lunar C)	James Arthur
2014	"Let It Be" (featuring Avelino)	Labrinth
2015	"Higher"	Sigma featuring Labrinth
2016	"Bad 4 Me"	Etta Bond

=== Unreleased tracks ===
Year	Song
2011	"Come Over" (with Etta Bond)
2011	"Every Dream" (with Etta Bond)
2012	"Fight Til the Death" (with Etta Bond)
2013	"Raid on Heathrow" (with Jason Julian)
2013	"Vomit" (with Etta Bond)
2013	"Mr. Manly" (with Etta Bond)
2014	"Chronic 2014"
2014	"Ghost on Toast"
2015	"Hiding Place"
2015	"Summer" (featuring Etta Bond, Avelino and Dun D)
