= Etta Bond =

British singer-songwriter

- Born: Henrietta Bond
- Origin: Cambridge, England
- Genres: Soul
- Occupation: Singer-songwriter
- Years active: 2011–present
- Label: OddChild Music

Henrietta "Etta" Bond is a British singer-songwriter. She was the first signing to OddChild Music, partially owing to Bond becoming friends with Labrinth thanks to a fluke Myspace encounter.

== Career ==
Writing material for her debut release, Bond worked with producer DaVinChe – having already uploaded the demo singles "Ask Me to Stay" and "Come Over". Credited as Henrietta, she appeared on DaVinChe's song "No Significance", which was also featured on the 4.3.2.1. film soundtrack. Bond also made an appearance on British rapper Wretch 32's second studio album, Black and White, on the track "Forgiveness" – which was released on 11 December 2011 as a single.

Bond and fellow OddChild signing Raf Riley (who's also had releases with Mad Decent) released a free collaboration EP on 20 July 2012 under the name Emergency Room, featuring the previously unreleased demo "Ask Me To Stay" alongside 7 other tracks, including the single "Boring Bitches", featuring Lady Leshurr. The video was produced by Reuben Dangoor alongside the EP artwork, and received mixed opinions due to the controversial content shown in the video.

The EP received support from many notable artists, including Labrinth, Diplo, Professor Green and Mike Skinner among others. "Resolve" was released in the form of a promotional video in December 2012. Both the video and artwork again made by Dangoor.

On 26 July 2013, ExR released the music video for "Big Girl's Vogue", the first promotional single from their second EP Meds. The eight-track EP was released for free download on 8 August 2013. The duo appeared on DJ Target's BBC Radio 1Xtra show on 13 August 2013 to promote the EP. They also appeared on CJ Beatz' "Soundcheck Special" to perform "Loophole" on 1Xtra on 9 September 2013. On 30 September 2013, they appeared on Rinse FM to perform "Break Free".

On 13 October 2014, Bond released her third extended play, entitled #CoolUrbanNewTalent. The release was her first solo EP, and features collaborations with Raf Riley and Delilah. As a follow-up to #CoolUrbanNewTalent Etta released her first single '18' featuring Etta's old lady alter ego who is 'growing old disgracefully' produced by MNEK. The video of '18' was released on 10 July 2015. Etta is currently working on new music with Raf Riley, Wilkinson, Mojam, Fred Ball (producer) and Naughty Boy.

Etta cites Labrinth, Jill Scott, Amy Winehouse, Erykah Badu, Michael Jackson, J Dilla and D'Angelo as major influences.

== Discography ==
=== Extended plays ===
Title	Details	Track listing
Emergency Room (with Raf Riley)	Released: 20 July 2012; Label: OddChild Music; Formats: Digital download	"Intro"; "Ask Me to Stay"; "Premeditated Murder"; "Boring Bitches" (featuring Lady Leshurr); "Resolve"; "Baddy"; "One Way on a Train"; "Outro"
Meds (with Raf Riley)	Released: 8 August 2013; Label: OddChild Music; Formats: Digital download	"Intro"; "Fanbabe"; "Me First"; "Loophole"; "1 More Time"; "Supposed to Say Goodbye"; "Break Free"; "Big Girl's Vogue"
#CoolUrbanNewTalent	Released: 13 October 2014; Label: OddChild Music; Formats: Digital download	"Mark Your Territory"; "In the Morning"; "King to Be"; "Bubble" (featuring Delilah); "Feels Like" (with Chris Loco)

=== Singles ===
==== As lead artist ====
Year	Song	Release	Label
2015	"18"	"18" - single	OddChild Music
2015	"Seen and Never Heard"	"Seen and Never Heard" - single	OddChild Music
2018	"Love Me Up"	"Love Me Up" - single	OddChild Music
2021	"How Could I Forget You"	"How Could I Forget You" - single	TLD Records

==== As featured artist ====
Year	Song	Album	Label
2011	"Forgiveness" (Wretch 32 featuring Etta Bond)	Black and White	Ministry of Sound
2012	"Treatment" (Labrinth featuring Etta Bond)	Electronic Earth	Syco
2012	"Playing with Fire" (Plan B featuring Labrinth & Etta Bond)	iLL Manors	679
2013	"Love Cards" (Devlin featuring Etta Bond)	A Moving Picture	Island
2014	"Life Round Here" (James Blake cover) (LayZ featuring Skepta and Etta Bond)	Non-album single	Self-released

=== Other appearances ===
Year	Song	Release	Label
2010	"No Significance" (DaVinChe featuring Henrietta Bond)	4.3.2.1. Soundtrack	Sony
2012	"Saved Me" (Josh Osho featuring Etta Bond)	The Manifesto	N/A
2012	"Condition" (LifeLines featuring Etta Bond)	One Hope	N/A
2012	"Mastermind" (Skepta featuring Etta Bond)	Blacklisted	3Beat
2013	"Under the Knife" (Labrinth featuring Etta Bond)	Atomic	OddChild Music
2015	"Yes, I Helped You Pack" (Ghostpoet featuring Etta Bond)	Shedding Skin	Play It Again Sam
2017	"Something New" (SiR featuring Etta Bond)	November	Top Dawg Entertainment
2019	"I Like the Way" (Moon Willis featuring Etta Bond)	"I Like the Way" (single)	Moon Willis Limited

=== Remixes ===
Year	Song	Artist
2012	"Treatment" (with Raf Riley)	Labrinth
2013	"Playing with Fire" (with Raf Riley)	Plan B featuring Labrinth

=== Unreleased tracks ===
Year	Song
2011	"Come Over" (with Raf Riley)
2011	"Every Dream" (with Raf Riley)
2012	"The Funeral" (with Raf Riley)
2012	"ThirsD" (with Fred Cox)
2012	"Fight Til the Death" (with Raf Riley)
2013	"Inside My Head" (with Balistiq)
2013	"Examine Me" (Warren Xclnce featuring Etta Bond)
2013	"Vomit" (with Raf Riley)
2013	"Corner Shop" (featuring RTKal & Fred Cox)
2013	"Mr. Manly" (with Raf Riley)

=== Music videos ===
Title	Year	Director	Notes
"Boring Bitches"	2012	Reuben Dangoor	with Raf Riley feat. Lady Leshurr
"Resolve"	2013	Reuben Dangoor	with Raf Riley
"Big Girl's Vogue"	2013	Jeremy Cole	with Raf Riley
"Under the Knife"	2013	Jeremy Cole	with Raf Riley
"Feels Like"	2014	Jeremy Cole	
"King to Be"	2014	Jeremy Cole	
"Fanbabe"	2014	Matthew Walker	with Raf Riley
"18" (Chris Loco Remix)	2015	Kojey Radical	
"Seen and Never Heard"	2015	Mike Gripz	with Chris Loco
"4U"	2016	Etta Bond, Rosie Matheson	
"Met Him"	2016	Etta Bond, Rosie Matheson	
"#bad4me"	2016	Etta Bond, Rosie Matheson	
"Kiss My Girlfriend"	2017	Sophie Jones	with Chris Loco
"Kiss My Girlfriend" (ExR Edition)	2017	Rosie Matheson	with Chris Loco
"Addiction"	2017	Rosie Matheson	
"Surface"	2018	Sophie Jones	feat. A2
"Let Me Hit It"	2018	Curtis Jehsta	
"No More Love"	2019	Tarique Al-Shabazz	
"Die in Your Arms"	2019	Jesse May Fisher	feat. Kaleem Taylor
"On a Beach"	2020	Curtis Jehsta	
"Break My Quarantine"	2020	Curtis Jehsta	
"On a Beach" (Champion & Double S Remix)	2020	Curtis Jehsta	feat. Champion & Double S
How Could I Forget You	2021	Curtis Jehsta	
