= 1 Day =

2009 film directed by Penny Woolcock

- Directed by: Penny Woolcock
- Written by: Penny Woolcock
- Starring: Dylan Duffus; Duncan Tobias; Yohance Watson; Ohran Whyte
- Release date: 6 November 2009
- Running time: 102 minutes
- Country: United Kingdom
- Language: English
- Budget: £750,000

1 Day is a 2009 British crime film about gangs and their communities in the urban areas of inner city Birmingham, with the majority of the film being shot in Handsworth, Birmingham and Winson Green. The story follows a young drug dealer, Flash as he attempts to get £100,000 to his boss Angel in less than 24 hours or face certain death. Directed by Penny Woolcock, the film is street-cast and features no professional actors. It stars Dylan Duffus, Duncan Tobias, Yohance Watson, and Ohran Whyte.

== Plot ==
Drug dealer, Flash (Dylan Duffus) receives a phone call from Angel (Yohance Watson) announcing that he is being released early from prison and wants the £500,000 he has left Flash for safekeeping during his incarceration. Flash is £100,000 short of the full amount and is pushed for time. Flash is forced to strike a deal with a rival gang member and drug dealer, Evil (Duncan Tobias) who more than lives up to his name. The film also includes the daily issues Flash faces due to his past actions as he is pressured by his three irate baby mothers and his grandmother due to his lack of involvement in his children's lives and constant upkeep of trouble. The movie follows Flash's race against time as he is pursued by a rival gang called The Zampa Boys as Flash is part of OSC (Old Street Crew). The movie reflects the reality of many young males involved in drug and gang activity within Birmingham and is said to give an insight into the notorious rivalry between the Burger Bar Boys and Johnson Crew.

== Cast ==
- Dylan Duffus as Flash
- Duncan Tobias as Evil
- Yohance Watson as Angel
- Ohran Whyte as Pest
- Monica Ffrench as Nanny
- Lady Leshurr as Shakia
- Chris Wilson as Prison Officer
- Malik MD7 as El Presidente

== Reception ==
The film has received a mixed reception amongst film critics.

In Birmingham it was withdrawn from the Odeon Cinemas chain, on the advice of the West Midlands Police. The West Midlands Police say they did not give such a statement.

== See also ==
- List of hood films
