= Atomic (EP) =

EP by Labrinth
- Released: 1 February 2013
- Recorded: 2012 at Milmark Studios, London
- Genre: Electronic; dubstep; R&B
- Length: 21:42
- Label: Odd Child
- Producer: Labrinth; Da Digglar; Raf Riley

Labrinth chronology
Electronic Earth (2012)	Atomic (2013)	LSD (2019)

Atomic (stylised as ATOMIC!) is an extended play (EP) by English electronic musician and producer Labrinth. Written and recorded throughout 2012, it was self-released on Labrinth's own label Odd Child Recordings on 1 February 2013 as a free digital download.

== Background ==
In May 2012, Labrinth uploaded a number of sketches of new songs on his second SoundCloud account 'Clean water', including "If Mario Had a Dad" (a demo version of "Let the Dogs Run Wild") and "Angry Mob" (a demo version of "Atomic"). "Let the Dogs Run Wild" samples a scene from the film Snatch where the character Tommy is asked if he likes "dags" (a pronunciation of dogs). "No Prisoners" was produced as the follow-up to an SB.TV collaboration project titled "Upcomers Anthem". The idea behind it was grouping together new talent on a track. The official video for "No Prisoners" premiered on SB.TV on 19 February 2013. Yungen was removed from the final version of the track but features in the video.

The EP in its entirety was made available for streaming on SoundCloud on Christmas Day 2012, although no downloadable edition was initially distributed. The EP was made available as a free digital download on Labrinth's Facebook page from 1 February 2013. Speaking about the collection, Labrinth has identified "Under the Knife" as one of his particular favourites, revealing that "it's basically about doing surgery on [your] soul or character instead of your appearance or being fake".

== Track listing ==
No.	Title	Length
1.	"Atomic" (featuring Plan B)	5:01
2.	"Let the Dogs Run Wild" (featuring Lady Leshurr)	4:28
3.	"No Prisoners" (featuring Marger, Lunar C, Mr Faiz and Maxsta)	4:18
4.	"Meanest Man" (featuring Devlin, Wretch 32, Ed Sheeran and ShezAr)	4:42
5.	"Under the Knife" (featuring Etta Bond)	3:14
