= ExR =

Etta Bond & Raf Riley's musical side project

- Origin: Cambridge via North London
- Genres: Soul-pop; glitch; bass music
- Years active: 2011
- Labels: Odd Child
- Members: Etta Bond; Raf Riley

ExR is a musical side project of Etta Bond and Raf Riley, signed to Labrinth's record label Odd Child. The duo released their first collaborative extended play Emergency Room for free download on 20 July 2012 following a series of unreleased ExR demos. They released two promotional singles from the EP in the form of music videos. Etta also performed "Baddy" in May 2013 for SB.TV as part of their String Sessions feature alongside a string quartet. After the EP, Riley released a solo EP and Bond worked on some new material with other producers.

On 26 July 2013, ExR released the music video for "Big Girl's Vogue", the first promotional single from their second EP Meds. The eight-track EP was released for free download on 8 August 2013. The duo appeared on DJ Target's BBC Radio 1Xtra show on 13 August 2013 to promote the EP. They also appeared on CJ Beatz' "Soundcheck Special" to perform "Loophole" on 1Xtra on 9 September 2013. On 30 September 2013, they appeared on Rinse FM to perform "Break Free".

The duo toured throughout 2013, performing at the likes of Global Gathering, Reading Festival, Leeds Festival and Wireless Festival. They've also supported Labrinth on his 2012 arena tour.

== Discography ==
=== EPs ===
Year	Album	Label
2012	Emergency Room	Odd Child
2013	Meds	Odd Child

=== Unreleased tracks ===
Year	Song
2011	"Come Over"
2011	"Every Dream"
2012	"The Funeral"
2012	"Fight Til the Death"
2013	"Vomit"
2013	"Mr. Manly"
