= OddChild Music =

- Type: Limited liability company
- Industry: Entertainment
- Founded: 2011
- Founder: Marc Williams
- Headquarters: London, UK.
- Area served: Worldwide
- Website: oddchildmusic.com

OddChild Music is an independent, London-based management company and record label founded by Marc Williams in 2011.

== History ==
The record label title comes from its purpose: to locate and nurture young and upcoming artists. It was revealed on 5 July 2011 that OddChild made its first signing with singer Etta Bond. Writing material for her debut release, Bond worked with producer DaVinChe – having already uploaded the demo singles "Ask Me to Stay" and "Come Over". Bond also made an appearance on British rapper Wretch 32's second studio album, Black and White, on the track "Forgiveness" – which was released on 11 December 2011 as a single.

Bond and fellow OddChild signing Raf Riley released a free collaboration EP as ExR on 20 July 2012 called Emergency Room, featuring the previously unreleased demo "Ask Me To Stay" alongside 7 other tracks. The EP includes the promotional single "Boring Bitches", featuring Lady Leshurr. The video was produced by Reuben Dangoor alongside the EP artwork, and received mixed opinions due to the controversial content shown in the video.

The EP received support from many notable artists, including Labrinth, Diplo, Professor Green and Mike Skinner amongst others. "Resolve" was released in the form of a promotional video in December 2012. Both the video and artwork were made by Dangoor.

On 26 July 2013, ExR released the music video for "Big Girl's Vogue", the first promotional single from their second EP Meds. The eight-track EP was released for free download on 8 August 2013.

On 13 October 2014, Etta Bond's third EP and debut solo EP, #CoolUrbanNewTalent, was released for free download. It features collaborations with Delilah, Raf Riley and Chris Loco. The video for Etta Bond's debut solo single '18' was released on 10 July 2015.

On 17 January 2015, the label released Ofei's Dreamers EP.

== Artists ==
- Ashnikko
- Chris Loco
- Coldabank
- Etta Bond
- Jason Julian
- Moon Willis
- New Machine
- Raf Riley

== Releases ==
Year	Artist	Release	Type	Release date
2012	Etta Bond & Raf Riley	Emergency Room	EP	20 Jul 2012
2013	Labrinth	Atomic	EP	1 Feb 2013
2013	Raf Riley	Now! That's What I Call Gangster Beats	EP	7 Feb 2013
2013	Etta Bond & Raf Riley	Meds	EP	8 Aug 2013
2014	Etta Bond	#CoolUrbanNewTalent	EP	13 Oct 2014
2015	Ofei	Dreamers	EP	17 Jan 2015
2015	Etta Bond	18	Single	10 Jul 2015
2015	Etta Bond & Chris Loco	Seen and Never Heard	Single	28 Jul 2015
2015	Chris Loco	See No Evil	EP	14 Oct 2015
2015	Etta Bond & Chris Loco	Seen and Never Heard (Remixes)	EP	6 Nov 2015
2015	Wretch 32 & Avelino	Young Fire, Old Flame	Mixtape	18 Dec 2015
2016	Avelino	FYO	EP	7 Apr 2016
2016	New Machine featuring Aaron London	Dare 4 U	Single	22 June 2016
