= Mavis Cheek =

English novelist (1948–2023)

Mavis Mary Cheek
- Born: Mavis Wilson; February 25, 1948; Wimbledon, London
- Died: June 14, 2023 (aged 75)
- Education: Hillcroft College
- Writing career
- Genre: Literary fiction

Mavis Mary Cheek (née Wilson, 25 February 1948 – 14 June 2023) was an English novelist. She was the author of fifteen novels, several of which have been translated into other languages. Cheeks' debut novel Pause Between Acts won the 1988 She/John Menzies First Novel Prize.

== Life and career ==
Cheek was born on 25 February 1948, in Wimbledon, now part of London. Her Scottish father, who was in the Royal Army Medical Corps, had a second family in another area of London. Cheek met him only once, when she was seven. When he abandoned them, her mother began working in a factory to support herself, her own mother and her daughter. Cheek felt she was unloved by her grandmother and her mother, and said that her feeling of being an outcast spurred her to become an observer in life.

Cheek was educated in church schools until the age of eleven when she failed her eleven-plus examination and was placed in the B stream of her girls' secondary modern school in Raynes Park. They did not do O-levels in her stream, but they did do drama. She appeared in school plays, including the title role of Julius Caesar, which began her lifelong love of theatre. She left school at sixteen to become a receptionist with Editions Alecto, a Kensington art publishing company. They produced the first series of etchings by David Hockney, "A Rake's Progress", and other groundbreaking works by contemporary artists. She later moved to the firm's gallery in Albemarle Street, where she dealt with Hockney and other artists such as Allen Jones, Patrick Caulfield and Gillian Ayres. In 1969 when she was twenty-one, Cheek married a childhood sweetheart, Chris Cheek, whom she had met at a meeting of the Young Communist League in New Malden when she was fifteen. He was a physicist. They both attended the Wimbledon Youth Parliament. They separated when Cheek was twenty-four. After twelve years with Editions Alecto, Cheek left to take a degree at Hillcroft College, a further education college for women, from which she graduated in the Arts with distinction. Shortly after this her daughter Bella was born. Bella's father is the artist Basil Beattie, with whom Cheek lived for ten years.

Although Cheek had planned to take a degree course, she turned instead to fiction writing while her daughter was a child, reading her early literary efforts aloud at weekly meetings of the Richmond Community Centre Writers' Circle, which she attended for several years. She completed a first, very serious novel, which she said she is thankful was never published. Instead she found her metier in "beady-eyed humour". She moved from London to Berkshire in 2001, and then to Aldbourne in the Wiltshire countryside in 2003.

Cheek was a moving force in 2010 behind the Marlborough LitFest. Her vision was to stop the celebrities taking over such festivals and celebrate authors who objectively write well. This has proved successful. Cheek also taught creative writing for the Arvon Foundation, for Tŷ Newydd, the Welsh affiliate to Arvon, and elsewhere. The occasions have varied from university weekend schools to voluntary work on courses at Holloway and Erlestoke prisons. As she described in an article, "What I see [at Erlstoke] is reflected in my own experience. Bright, overlooked, unconfident men, who are suddenly given the opportunity to learn, grow wings and dare to fail. It helps to be able to tell them that I, too, was once designated thick by a very silly [education] system. My prisoners have written some brilliant stuff, and perhaps it gives them back some self-esteem." She was Royal Literary Fund fellow at Chichester University (twice) and at the University of Reading. She gave talks and readings at Festivals, at literary lunches and as an after-dinner speaker. In 2011 and 2012 she was the judge for the Society of Authors' McKitterick Prize, awarded for a first novel.

Cheek expressed interest in environmental issues, notably her carbon footprint as a gas-guzzling former countrywoman. She also appeared in discussions of literature and classical music on the BBC Radio 4, in Michael Berkley's Private Passions, and on Sarah Walker's morning programme.

Cheek died from oesophageal cancer on 14 June 2023, at the age of 75.

== Writings ==
The subject of Cheek's first published novel, Pause between Acts (1988), is an amused look at her own dismay at discovering that a favourite actor, Ian McKellen, was gay. It won the She/John Menzies First Novel Prize. Cheek wrote it after being advised by literary agent Imogen Parker that comedy was art, and that she should forget about her serious novel as she seemed a natural at humour. Her favourite review classed her as "Jane Austen in modern dress." Her sales of 90,000 with Mrs Fytton's Country Life (2000) doubled her previous record. In 2012 Cheek said that she was one in a line of feminist, subversive women authors – with jokes. Pause Between Acts, Aunt Margaret's Lover and Amenable Women were reissued in 2019.

Cheek's work is full of comedy. She claimed to pay little attention to plot, but enjoyed dotting her work with literary quotations and allusions. As one journalist put it in 2006, "Mavis Cheek is generally acknowledged by those who generally acknowledge these things to be a writer of the genre known as 'comedies of manners' who may count herself in the same class as Jane Austen and Charlotte Brontë and Barbara Pym. She describes, as they did, the relationship between herself and the society in which she finds herself, and is often, as they were, excruciatingly funny about it without ever being remotely arch...." She mentioned Jane Austen, George Eliot, Arnold Bennett, Stella Gibbons, William Boyd and Beryl Bainbridge as "literary heroes". For "A Good Read" on the BBC Radio 4 programme of that name broadcast on 7 June 2011 she chose Micka by Frances Kay. Her own novel, Janice Gentle Gets Sexy, was chosen for A Good Read in its year of paperback publication, 1994.

The Sex Life of My Aunt (2002), her tenth novel, draws liberally on Cheek's own background and childhood, including something of her family's uneasy relationships. There are strong autobiographical elements also in her twelfth novel, Yesterday's Houses (2006), about the beginning of a woman's life married to a house converter. Amenable Women (2008), her 13th novel, tells how a woman, freed from an infuriating husband by a fatal balloon accident, decides to complete a local history he began and then becomes deeply involved, through a Holbein portrait, with Anne of Cleves, the fourth wife of Henry VIII. Alison Weir, the historical writer and novelist, has said of this, "If you want to know the truth about Anne of Cleves, read this book." Cheek's fifteenth novel is titled, The Lovers of Pound Hill (2011).

Cheek's novels have been translated into German, Spanish, Polish, Croatian, Dutch, Italian, Greek, Hebrew and several other languages.

In 2011 Cheek contributed a short story to The Best Little Book Club in Town, an anthology published by The Orion Publishing Group.

Cheek wrote the introduction for the 2011 reissue by Virago Modern Classics of Barbara Pym's 1950 novel, Some Tame Gazelle.

In 2016 Cheek's novel Dog Days was reissued by Ipso Books. When asked by an interviewer what sort of man her divorced heroine Patricia might be happiest with, Cheek said she would choose someone who resembled author Henning Mankell, businessman and television presenter Gerry Robinson, or actor Martin Shaw as a partner for her.

In 2019, Amenable Women, Aunt Margaret's Lover, and Pause Between Acts were reissued by Psychology News Press Ltd, with new introductions by the author.

== Awards ==
1988 – Pause Between Acts wins the She/John Menzies Prize for a first novel.

2004 – Patrick Parker's Progress is shortlisted for the UK's Saga Prize, awarded to authors over age fifty.

== Bibliography ==
- Pause Between Acts (The Bodley Head Ltd, 1988; Simon and Schuster, 1988; Psychology News Press Ltd, 2019)
- Parlour Games (Simon and Schuster, 1989)
- Dog Days (Charnwood, 1990; Peters Fraser & Dunlop - Ipso Books, 2016)
- Janice Gentle Gets Sexy (Hamish Hamilton, 1993)
- Aunt Margaret's Lover (Penguin Books Ltd, 1994; 2014; Psychology News Ltd, 2019)
- Sleeping Beauties (Faber and Faber Ltd, 1996)
- Getting Back Brahms (Faber and Faber Ltd, 1997)
- Three Men on a Plane (Faber and Faber Ltd, 1999; Chivers Press Ltd, 2002)
- Mrs Fytton's Country Life (Faber and Faber Ltd, 2000)
- The Sex Life of My Aunt (Faber and Faber Ltd, 2002)
- Patrick Parker's Progress (QPD, 2004)
- Yesterday's Houses (Faber and Faber, 2007)
- Amenable Women (Faber and Faber, 2008; Psychology News Ltd, 2019)
- Truth to Tell (Charnwood, 2011)
- The Lovers of Pound Hill (Hutchinson Publishing, 2011)

== Sources ==
- An appearance at the 2006 Charleston Festival in Sussex, England: Retrieved 3 April 2012.
- A discussion of Patrick Parker's Progress on BBC Woman's Hour, 26 January 2004: Retrieved 3 April 2012.
- A discussion of Yesterday's Houses on BBC Woman's Hour, 3 February 2006: Retrieved 3 April 2012.
- Cheek Cheek short stories online: Jubilee Tuck: Retrieved 3 August 2012; A Wasp Sting: Retrieved 3 August 2012; A Suitable Evening Class: Retrieved 3 August 2012.
- A 2012 picture of Cheek Cheek talking with Margaret Drabble. Retrieved 3 August 2012.
