= Young Fire, Old Flame =

Mixtape by Wretch 32 and Avelino
- Released: 18 December 2015
- Genre: British hip hop
- Length: 49:38
- Label: Renowned; Odd Child
- Producer: Wizzy Wow; DJ Smasherelly; KZ; Mikey Muzik; Mokeyzz; Chris Loco; Pr02 Jay

Wretch 32 chronology
Wretchercise (2012)	Young Fire, Old Flame (2015)	Growing Over Life (2016)

Avelino chronology
Iconic Ambition (2014)	Young Fire, Old Flame (2015)	FYO (2016)

Singles from Young Fire, Old Flame
- 1. "Echoes" Released: 8 September 2015; 2. "Young Fire, Old Flame" Released: 14 December 2015; 3. "Hulk Hogan" Released: 16 December 2015; 4. "GMO" Released: 22 December 2015; 5. "The 15th" Released: 15 January 2016; 6. "Gift to You" Released: 26 February 2016

Young Fire, Old Flame is a collaborative mixtape by British rappers Wretch 32 and Avelino, released for free download on 18 December 2015. It serves as Wretch's seventh and Avelino's third mixtape. The project features guest appearances from Sneakbo, Loick Essien and Fuse ODG among others. Its artwork was designed by Funny Tummy. A deluxe version was released ten years later on 12 December 2025, Containing eight new songs.

== Background and release ==
On 8 September 2015, "Echoes" was uploaded to Jada's SoundCloud account for free download, prior to the announcement of Young Fire, Old Flame.

The mixtape release was preceded by a joint Fire in the Booth freestyle segment on Charlie Sloth's BBC Radio 1Xtra show on 12 December 2015, during which host Charlie Sloth praised Wretch for delivering "the hardest verse [the show] has ever had". Noisey's Joe Zadeh said of the freestyle that it was "like watching Macklemore Jekyll and Hyde himself into Kendrick for an evening", considering that Wretch's commercial singles are "soft as trifle".

A video for a live version of the mixtape's title track, "Young Fire, Old Flame", premiered on Link Up TV on 14 December 2015 as the first offering from the project. This was followed by a video for "Hulk Hogan" two days later on the same channel, and the full mixtape was released for free download via mixtape sites on 18 December 2015. This was followed by a live version of "GMO", performed on Not For The Radio on 22 December. A video for "The 15th" was, appropriately, released on 15 January 2016 on the Link Up TV channel. The mixtape's fifth single, "Gift to You", was accompanied by a video, released on 26 February 2016.

"Young Fire" represents Avelino and the youth of the UK rap scene, whereas "Old Flame" represents Wretch and his previous successes in the industry. The two rappers changed their Twitter display names to Young Fire and Old Flame respectively to promote the mixtape's release.

== Critical reception ==
The mixtape was generally met with positive feedback from critics. Complex’s Tobi Oke said of the collaboration that "this tag-team was just meant to be". MTV's Kamilla Baiden complimented the project for being "packed with unlimited quotables", NME described it as "explosive" and RWD Magazine’s Grant Brydon called the release "an earlier [sic] Christmas gift" which "sets the pair up nicely for a great 2016". Pardon My Blog’s Sarah Malik described the tape as "an eclectic representation of the capabilities encompassed by both artists" which "brews with nostalgia".

== Track listing ==
Digital download
No.	Title	Producer(s)	Length
1.	"Young Fire, Old Flame" (featuring J. Warner)	Wizzy Wow	3:43
2.	"Nothing Will" (featuring Bobii Lewis and Super Nero)	DJ Smasherelly	3:45
3.	"Crucifly" (featuring Bobii Lewis and KZ)	KZ	4:40
4.	"Hulk Hogan"	Wizzy Wow	4:36
5.	"The 15th" (featuring Moelogo and Sneakbo)	Mikey Muzik; Mo "Mokeyzz" Samuels	4:28
6.	"Issues" (featuring Loick Essien and Hurricane Hunt)	KZ	4:16
7.	"GMO" (featuring Youngs Teflon)	Rascal; Chris Loco	4:21
8.	"Echoes" (featuring Jada and Bobii Lewis)	KZ	4:08
9.	"Marathon Girl" (featuring Yungen and Fuse ODG)	KZ	2:46
10.	"Gift to You" (featuring Moelogo)	Mikey Muzik; Mo "Mokeyzz" Samuels; Pr02 Jay	3:19
11.	"Dear Summer" (featuring Bobii Lewis and EMO)	Mikey Muzik; Mo "Mokeyzz" Samuels	4:20
12.	"Dry Cry" (featuring Stacey Barthe)	KZ	5:23
Total length:			49:38

Notes

- "GMO" samples "Halfway Love (Chris Loco Flip)" by Elhae.

10th Anniversary Deluxe Edition
No.	Title	Producer(s)	Length
1.	"More Fire More Flamez"	Finlay Woolfson	3:10
2.	"Off the Throne" (featuring tendai)	Finlay Woolfson; GX	2:54
3.	"Black Orchid" (featuring Tiny Boost and Youngs Teflon)	Knox Brown	3:01
4.	"Baguettes" (featuring Proph)	Emil; Yogic	2:38
5.	"10 Years"	Knox Brown	2:35
6.	"GMO2"	Chris Loco	2:30
7.	"Collage Basquiat" (featuring AV Allure)	Knox Brown	4:01
8.	"Daily Duppy" (Bonus)	Knox Brown	2:55
Total length:			23:44
