= Avelino (rapper) =

- Also known as: AA; Young Fire
- Born: Achi Avelino; 4 June 1993 (age 33); Angola
- Origin: Tottenham, London, England
- Genres: British hip hop
- Occupations: Rapper; singer
- Years active: 2008–present
- Label: More Music (2008–present)
- Website: officialavelino.com

Achi Avelino (born 4 June 1993), better known mononymously by his stage name Avelino, is a British rapper and singer known for his "unique tone" and "deep wordplay".

== Early life ==
Avelino was born in Angola as one of six siblings and moved to England with his family aged three amidst the Angolan Civil War, initially as refugees before obtaining British citizenship. In his youth, he used lyrics as a form of journal therapy.

== Career ==
=== 2011–2014: Beginnings ===
Originally rapping under the monikers AA (derived from his initials), Avelino first released freestyles on YouTube. His debut mixtape, Underdog Music, was released in 2013 through More Music Records. The project was credited by GRM Daily's Charlie-Louise Akintilo as being "edgy" and "refreshing".

=== 2014–2015: Commercial breakthrough and Iconic Ambition ===
Avelino rose to prominence in 2014 following the release of his second mixtape, Iconic Ambition, which was featured on DJ Semtex's Mixtape Top 5 on BBC Radio 1Xtra. He went on to support Stormzy on tour throughout 2015, having previously collaborated on the mixtape track "No Comment".

=== 2015–2016: Collaborations with Wretch 32 and Young Fire, Old Flame ===
Throughout 2015, Avelino was championed by fellow Tottenham MC Wretch 32. The two rappers released a joint mixtape, entitled Young Fire, Old Flame, on 18 December 2015, to positive reception. Avelino was Young Fire, whereas Wretch 32 was Old Flame. The mixtape was accompanied by a Fire in the Booth freestyle on BBC Radio 1, which was heralded by host Charlie Sloth as the "hardest" Fire in the Booth of all time, and by Noiseys Joe Zadeh as "staggering". Wretch and Avelino also collaborated on the promotional singles "M.O.E" and "Freedom", as well as an unofficial remix of Kanye West's "No More Parties in LA", renamed "No More Parties in DSTRKT". The two performed the mixtape at KOKO on 12 May 2016.

== 2016–2022: FYO extended play and non-album singles ==
On 7 April 2016, Avelino released his debut EP, FYO, for free download. It was executive produced by Raf Riley. The project, which stands for Fuck Your Opinion, has received considerable support from BBC Radio 1; "Youniverse" has been played by MistaJam, and the title track was added to 1Xtra's C-list playlist on 6–12 May 2016. Supporters of the song include Annie Mac and Charlie Sloth. The EP topped Semtex's Mixtape Top 5 chart. It was said in 2015 that he was working on his debut studio album.

Avelino released a new single, "On a Roll", for free download via SoundCloud on 30 August 2016. The song features guest vocals from Abra Cadabra, and has been played by DJ Target on 1Xtra. The same week, Avelino featured on Wretch 32's single "Open Conversation & Mark Duggan", released on 1 September 2016, a day prior to his third studio album, Growing Over Life.

On 10 February 2017, Avelino released a single titled "Energy" which features Skepta and Stormzy. The single was used by EA Sports game, FIFA 18 demo and is being touted as the headline song on FIFA 18 soundtrack. At the time of writing, Energy's official music video has racked up over 1.5 million views on YouTube and various remixes, notably with regular collaborator Wretch 32, have been released.

In May 2018, Avelino released "So Fine", featuring Haile WSTRN, which was certified Silver by the British Phonographic Industry (BPI) in 2023. Later in 2018, he released "Boasy", featuring Not3s, which was certified silver by the BPI in 2019.

== 2022–2023: Debut album God Save the Streets ==
In 2023, three years after announcing it, Avelino released his debut album God Save the Streets. Named in reference to the Sex Pistols song "God Save the Queen" as a nod to the commonalities between rap and punk rock, the album featured bass guitar from Glen Matlock on its lead single "Vex", which featured Ghetts and BackRoad Gee. Over the course of the album, its lyrics tackle subjects such as inequality and mental health.

== Personal life ==
Avelino is an avid supporter of Manchester United F.C.

== Discography ==
=== Studio albums ===
Title	Details	Peak chart positions UK
GOD SAVE THE STREETS	Released: 14 April 2023; Label: OddChild Music, More Music Records; Format: Digital download	12

=== Extended plays ===
Title	Details
FYO	Released: 7 April 2016; Label: OddChild Music, More Music Records; Format: Digital download

=== Mixtapes ===
Title	Details	Peak chart positions
Title	Details	UK
Underdog Music	Released: 11 January 2013; Label: More Music Records; Format: Free digital download	—
Iconic Ambition	Released: 10 September 2014; Label: More Music Records; Format: Free digital download	—
Young Fire, Old Flame (with Wretch 32)	Released: 18 December 2015; Label: Renowned, More Music Records; Format: Free digital download	—
No Bullshit	Released: 27 October 2017; Label: More Music Records / OddChild Music; Format: digital download	—
Ego Kills	Released: 23 July 2021; Label: More Music Records / OddChild Music; Format: digital download	—
