= Lady Leshurr =

British rapper and singer (born 1987)

Lady Leshurr BEM
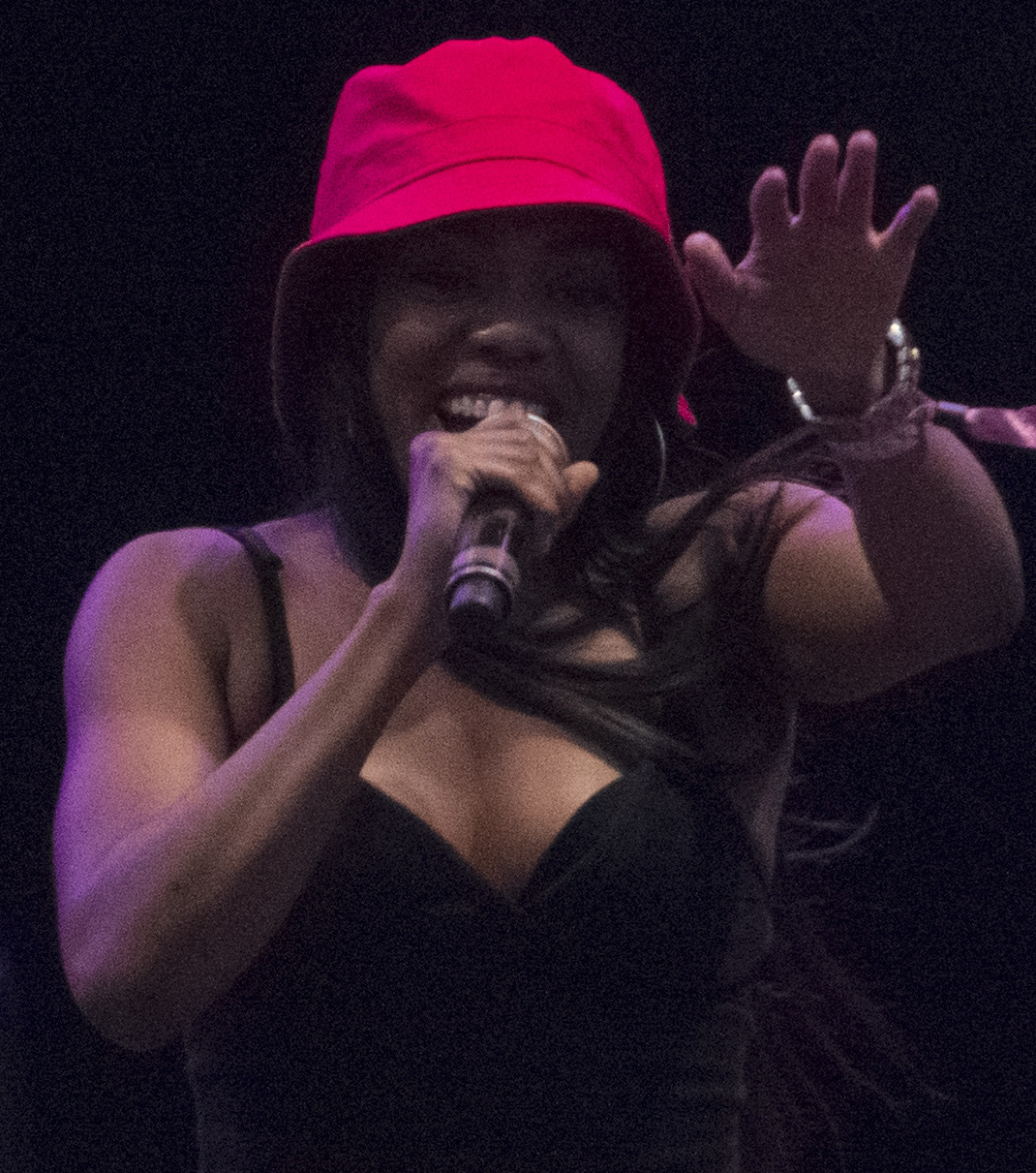
- Lady Leshurr performing at Field Day 2017

Background information
- Born: Melesha Katrina O'Garro; 15 December 1987 (age 38)
- Origin: Kingshurst, Solihull, England
- Genres: Hip hop; grime; dancehall
- Occupations: Rapper; singer; songwriter; record producer
- Years active: 2009–present
- Labels: RCA; Sony; Unleshed Records

Melesha Katrina O'Garro BEM (born 15 December 1987), known professionally as Lady Leshurr (/ˈliːʃər/), is a British rapper, singer, songwriter and producer. She is known for her Queen's Speech series of freestyles, the fourth of which became popular in 2016. Her subsequent freestyle, Queen's Speech 5, was called "brilliant" and "2015's crowning freestyle" by Spin. In 2021, she entered the Channel 4 series The Celebrity Circle for Stand Up to Cancer, catfishing as Big Narstie, and won. She also competed in the thirteenth series of Dancing on Ice, where she reached the semi-final.

== Early life ==
Melesha Katrina O'Garro was born on 15 December 1987 to Kittitian parents. She became interested in poetry and writing at the age of six, but decided that writing music would bring her to a wider audience. She released her first mixtape at the age of fourteen. In her words:

I grew up around music. My mum used to play a lot of reggae like Sister Nancy and Bob Marley around the house so basically, when I was around six, I was messing about and doing my own little raps and songs. My family are all rappers and singers anyway so I was always involved in it from a young age.

— Lady Leshurr, 2011

== Career ==
Leshurr played one of the lead female roles in Vertigo Films' 2009 film 1 Day. In 2010 Leshurr's first television music video appearance came in the music video "Game Over Female Takeover", featuring Amplify Dot, Mz Bratt, Ruff Diamondz and others. The music video was directed by Nick Donnelly and produced by Carla Marie Williams. Leshurr won second place in the Best Female category of the Official Mixtape Awards 2011. To complement the music releases, she has designed a range of merchandise, the "Friggin L" clothing line named after her 2011 mixtape Friggin L.

In 2016, she won the MOBO Award, celebrating excellence in black music, for Best Female Act. In 2019, she won the award for "Best Rap / Grime Act" and in 2020 she won "Best Solo Female" at the Birmingham Music Awards. In 2019, Leshurr performed at The Nicki Wrld Tour in Birmingham and Manchester as a special guest for rapper Nicki Minaj.

She was awarded the British Empire Medal (BEM) in the 2020 Birthday Honours for services to music and charity.

In 2020, she appeared in a commercial advertising for beauty brand Olay and became the first Black British woman to lead a campaign for the company.

In late 2020, it was announced that Lady Leshurr would be joining the line-up at BBC Radio 1Xtra with her own Saturday afternoon radio show. In February 2023, it was announced that she would be replaced by Joelah Noble as presenter of the Saturday afternoon show.

In 2021, she appeared as a contestant on the thirteenth series of Dancing on Ice, partnered with Brendyn Hatfield. After surviving three skate-offs during the competition, Leshurr was eliminated in the semi-final, leaving her in fourth place. She also won The Celebrity Circle for Stand Up to Cancer.

In 2021, Leshurr announced a partnership with Kamo Premium Vodka, through which she became a co-owner.

In April and August 2022, Leshurr appeared as a guest panellist on the ITV show Loose Women.

In 2025, Leshurr was announced in the line-up for Celebrity SAS: Who Dares Wins.

== Influences ==
Leshurr has named Eminem, Busta Rhymes, Ms. Dynamite, Missy Elliott and Lil Wayne as her primary influences. Nia Kay, a competitor on The Rap Game season 2, stated that Leshurr was one of her influences due to her uniqueness and rap skill.

== Personal life ==
Leshurr came out as pansexual in September 2018.

In late 2019 Leshurr took time out from her music career following the death of her sister from breast cancer.

On 22 October 2022, Leshurr and Sherelle Smith allegedly assaulted Leshurr's ex-girlfriend Sidnee Hussein and Hussein's new girlfriend Chante Boyea. She was charged with two counts of assault occasioning actual bodily harm, and Smith was charged with one count of the same offence. Both women pleaded not guilty to their charges and were bailed. Twelve months later, the pair were found not guilty at Snaresbrook Crown Court. The prosecution said that Leshurr had bitten Boyea's hand, while the defence said that Leshurr had been bitten by Boyea's Belgian Shepherd dog. After her acquittal, Leshurr said that her career had been ruined due to loss of deals and income because of the charges.

== Discography ==
=== Mixtapes ===
Title	Details
Friggin L	Released: 8 April 2011; Label: Self-released; Formats: Streaming
2000 and L	Released: 11 May 2012; Label: Self-released; Formats: Streaming
L Yeah!	Released: 15 February 2013; Label: Self-released; Formats: Streaming
Mona Leshurr	Released: 9 March 2013; Label: Self-released; Formats: Streaming, Digital download
Lil Bit of Lesh	Released: 22 May 2014; Label: Self-released; Formats: Streaming, Digital download

=== Extended plays ===
Title	Details
Queen's Speech	Released: 9 September 2016; Label: Self-released; Formats: Streaming, digital download
Mode	Released: 27 April 2017; Label: Sony; Formats: Streaming, digital download
Quaranqueen	Released: 6 June 2020; Label: Unleshed Records; Formats: Streaming, digital download
Astronaut	Released: 26 December 2020; Label: Unleshed Records; Formats: Streaming, digital download

=== Singles ===
==== As lead artist ====
Year	Title	Album
2011	"Friggin L"	Friggin L
2011	"Lego"	Non-album singles
2015	"Lukatar"	Non-album singles
2015	"Queen's Speech 1"	Queen's Speech
2015	"Queen's Speech 2"	Queen's Speech
2015	"Queen's Speech 3"	Queen's Speech
2015	"Queen's Speech 4"	Queen's Speech
2016	"Queen's Speech 5"	Queen's Speech
2016	"Panda Freestyle"	Non-album singles
2016	"Where Are You Now?" (featuring Wiley)	Non-album singles
2016	"Queen's Speech 6"	Non-album singles
2017	"Juice"	Mode
2017	"Queen's Speech 7"	Non-album singles
2018	"R.I.P"	Non-album singles
2018	"New Freezer"	Non-album singles
2018	"OMW"	Non-album singles
2018	"Black Madonna" (featuring Mr Eazi)	Non-album singles
2018	"Black Panther"	Non-album singles
2018	"3AM In Brum"	Non-album singles
2019	"Horrid"	Non-album singles
2019	"I've Gotta Be Me"	Non-album singles
2019	"Your Mr"	Non-album singles
2020	"Carmen"	Non-album singles
2020	"Quarantine Speech"	Quaranqueen
2020	"Quaranting" (featuring Busy Signal)	Quaranqueen
2020	"Unleshed 4"	Non-album single
2020	"DIV"	Astronaut
2021	"2Gether Now"	Non-album singles
2022	"Likkle Darling"	Non-album singles
2022	"Tabasco"	Non-album singles
2024	"Not Guilty"	Non-album singles
2025	"Set Up Chicks"	Back 2 Basics

==== As featured artist ====
Year	Title	Album
2011	"Move" (Fire Camp featuring Lady Leshurr and Scrufizzer)	Move
2012	"Murder" (Lea-Anna featuring Lioness, Lady Leshurr and Ce'Cile)	Murder EP
2012	"Finally" (Leon & Harvey featuring Lady Leshurr)	Finally EP
2012	"Wonky" (Orbital featuring Lady Leshurr)	Wonky
2012	"Boring Bitches" (Etta Bond and Raf Riley featuring Lady Leshurr)	Emergency Room
2012	"Run Your Mouth" (Noisses featuring Rtkal, Foreign Beggars and Lady Leshurr)	Run Your Mouth EP
2012	"Step in the Dance" (Mike Delinquent Project featuring Lady Leshurr)	Step in the Dance EP
2012	"Sick Love" (Vince Kidd featuring Lady Leshurr)	Sick Love EP
2013	"Blazin'" (Torqux featuring Lady Leshurr)	Blazin' EP
2013	"Bet on It" (Young O featuring Griminal and Lady Leshurr)	Bet on It
2013	"Swag Fi Dem" (RSXG Productions, Juki Ranx and Brooklynne featuring Lady Leshurr)	Swag Fi Dem EP
2013	"I Ain't Rich... Yet" (J. Appiah featuring Lady Leshurr)	I Ain't Rich... Yet EP
2016	"Run" (Tiggs Da Author featuring Lady Leshurr)	Non-album singles
2018	"Block and Delete" (C4 featuring Lady Leshurr)	Non-album singles
2018	"Don't Believe You" (Lethal Bizzle featuring Lady Leshurr)	Non-album singles
2019	"Pretty Little Thing" (will.i.am featuring Lady Leshurr, Lioness & Ms Banks)	Non-album singles
2019	"Mike Myers" (Swifta Beater featuring Lady Leshurr, Remtrex and Bowzer Boss)	Non-album singles
2019	"Still Here" (Off course featuring Lady Leshurr)	Non-album singles
2020	"Up In Smoke" (Remtrex feat. Lady Leshurr and Yates)	Bars From the Pen 2
2021	"No Time For Tears" (Nathan Dawe and Little Mix)	Non-album singles
2022	"Likkle Miss (The Fine Nine Remix)" (Nicki Minaj feat. Skeng, Spice, Destra, Patrice Roberts, Lady Leshurr, Pamputtae, Lisa Mercedez, Dovey Magnum, London Hill)	Queen Radio: Volume 1

=== Guest appearances ===
Year	Title	Album	Label
2010	"This is SRE (Drop the Funk)" (Invasion Remix) (SRE featuring Lady Leshurr, Jaykae and Hitman)	This is SRE EP	Sidewinder Raw
2011	"We Know" (Trilla featuring R.I.O and Lady Leshurr)	01:21	Trilla Music
2011	"Ready" (Remix 2) (Cons featuring Tor, Kasay, Tempa, Lady Leshurr and Nolay)	June Bug	RGS
2011	"Gangster" (Lady Leshurr Remix) (Zdot featuring Lady Leshurr)	Gangster	Elite Music
2011	"So Much More" (Manga featuring KOF and Lady Leshurr)	Obzokey Wranglings	—N/a
2012	"Heart of Stone" (Bashy featuring Dot Rotten, Black the Ripper and Lady Leshurr)	The Great Escape	SB.TV
2012	"Level Up" (Remix) (Sway featuring Kelsey and Lady Leshurr)	Level Up EP	3Beat
2012	"WAVY" (Seamix) (Kano and Footsie featuring Lady Leshurr, Jme, D Double E and Sway)	WAVY / Kano Stencils	—N/a
2012	"Hoods Up" (Remix) (Teddy Music featuring Lil Nasty, Double S, Lady Leshurr, Scrufizzer, Dot Rotten and Tre Mission)	Hoods Up EP	Teddy Music
2012	"I Wanna Rock" (All Stars Remix) (Maxsta featuring Tinchy Stryder, Rizzle Kicks and Lady Leshurr)	I Wanna Rock EP	Sony
2012	"Move to Da Gyal Dem" (Female Remix) (Donae'o featuring Mz. Bratt, Lioness, Terri Walker and Lady Leshurr)	Move to Da Gyal Dem	Zephron
2012	"Da Cypher (Part Deux)" (Bigz featuring Lady Leshurr and Mistah Fab)	The Bigz Bang Theory	DCypha
2012	"Va Heter Det" (Max Peezay featuring Lady Leshurr)	F.A.S 3	Devrim
2013	"Let the Dogs Run Wild" (Labrinth featuring Lady Leshurr)	Atomic	Odd Child
2013	"Now That You're Gone" (Remix) (Tanya Lacey featuring Lady Leshurr)	Now That You're Gone EP	Laceywood
2013	"Hoods Up" (Remix) (Lil Nasty featuring Double S, Lady Leshurr, Dot Rotten and Tre Mission)	This is UK Grime Vol. 3	Defenders
2013	"Off the Leash" (Teddy Music featuring Double S and Lady Leshurr)	Rehearsals	Teddy Music
2013	"Spitfire" (Big Shizz, Lady Leshurr, Jammer, Realz, Jammin and Villain)	Lord of the Mics V	Lord of the Mics
2014	"Evolution 2.0" (Kid Bookie Samantha Mumba, Kuniva, Crooked I, Scrufizzer, Lady Leshurr & Dot Rotten)	That SP Compilation, Vol.1	That SP Studios
2014	"Bother You" (Remix) (D'banj featuring Lady Leshurr)	Bother You	Mi7, DKM
2014	"Got It" (Zdot and Krunchie featuring Krept, Konan and Lady Leshurr)	Adrenaline EP	Sonus Music
2014	"Blow It Up" (Zdot and Krunchie featuring Lady Leshurr)	Adrenaline EP	Sonus Music

== Filmography ==
=== Film ===
Year	Title	Role	Notes
2009	1 Day	Shakia	Credited as Lady L
2010	Fifty	Keema	Short film
2015	Lapse of Honour	Eve	
2018	The Intent 2: The Come Up	Cameo	
2021	On the Other Foot	Therese	

=== Television ===
Year	Title	Function	Notes
2018	Later... with Jools Holland	Musical guest	
2018	Sunday Brunch	Musical guest	
2018	The X Factor UK	Musical guest	
2018	Happy Hour with Olly Murs	Musical guest	
2018	The Big Narstie Show	Guest	
2018	I'm a Celebrity: Extra Camp	Guest panelist	5 episodes
2018–2022	Don't Hate the Playaz	Team captain	4 series
2019	The Rap Game UK	Special guest judge	
2019	Even Later...with Jools Holland & Lady Leshurr	Special guest co-host	
2019, 2021	CelebAbility	Contestant	2 episodes
2020	Celebrity MasterChef	Contestant	3 episodes
2020	Ghost Bus Tours	Participant	
2020	I'm a Celebrity: The Daily Drop	Guest panellist	
2020	The Jonathan Ross Show	Guest	
2020	Shopping with Keith Lemon	Guest	
2020	The Russell Howard Hour	Guest	5 episodes
2020–2021	Steph's Packed Lunch	Guest co-host	10 episodes
2021	Dancing on Ice	Contestant	Semi-finalist
2021	The Celebrity Circle	Contestant	Winner
2021	The Wheel	Contestant	
2021	The Hit List	Contestant	
2021	I Like the Way U Move	Guest judge	
2021	Rock of All Ages	Mentor	
2021, 2022	Blankety Blank	Contestant	2 episodes
2022	Taskmaster's New Year Treat II	Contestant	
2022	Would I Lie to You?	Contestant	
2022	Rock Till We Drop	Presenter	4 episodes
2022	Loose Women	Guest panellist	4 episodes
2022	Never Mind the Buzzcocks	Contestant	
2023	Celebrity Catchphrase	Contestant	
2025	Celebrity SAS Who Dares Wins	Contestant	8th Place
