= Reniere & Depla =

Belgian artist duo

Reniere & Depla is a Belgian artist duo, consisting of Paul Reniere (Poperinge, Belgium,°1956) and Martine Depla (Ostend, Belgium,°1954). Together they paint primarily with acrylic paint on canvas and wood panel. They have curated exhibitions in Belgium and France, showing the works of [Berlinde De Bruyckere], [Hans op de Beeck], and other celebrated Belgian artists. In 2018, they organised the first edition of Art Autun, a biennale of contemporary art in Autun. Their common career as artists began in 1995. They live and work in [Watou] (West-Flanders, Belgium) and Autun (Burgundy, France). Like a growing group of contemporary artists they use photography as source material for their work.

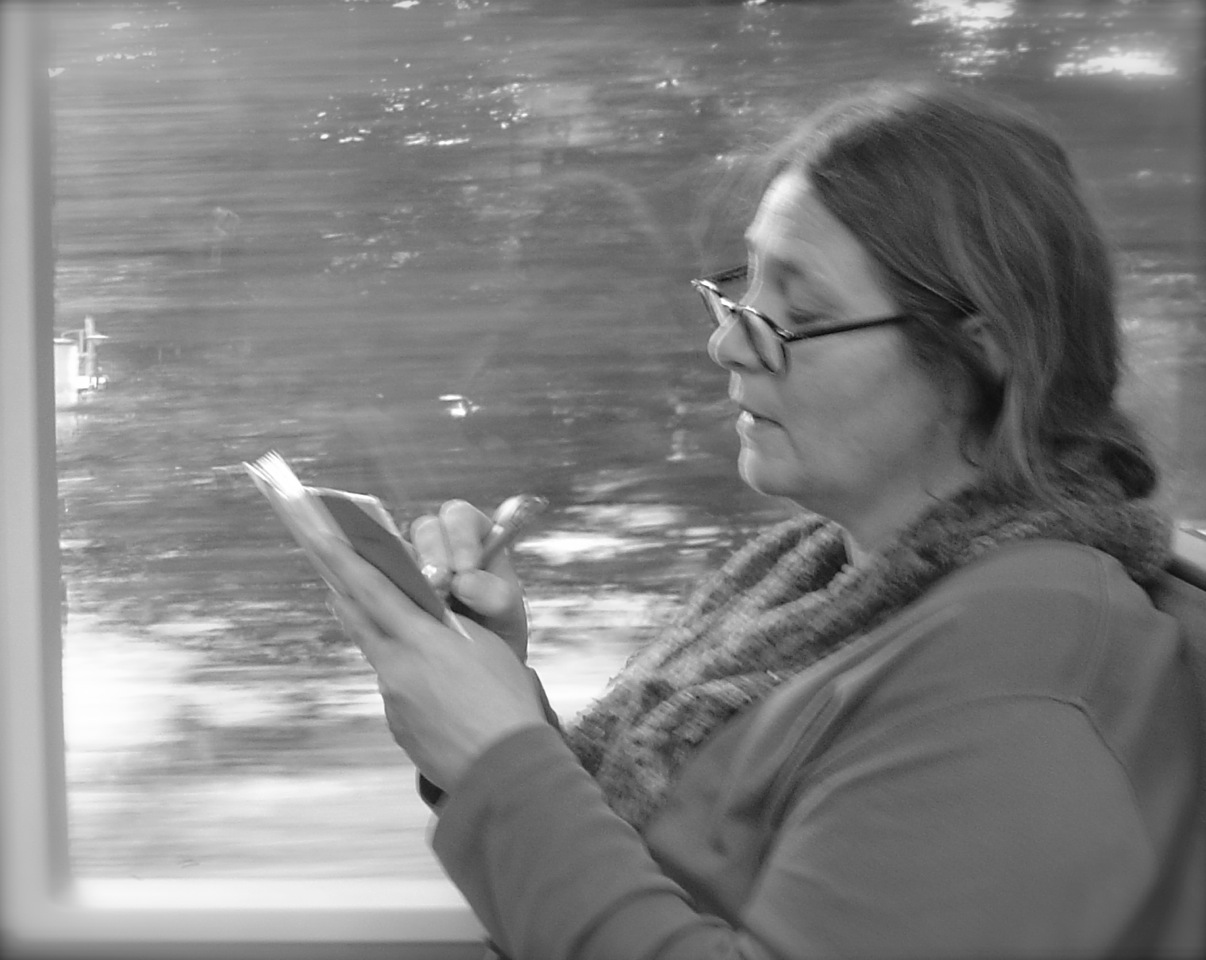
Martine Depla

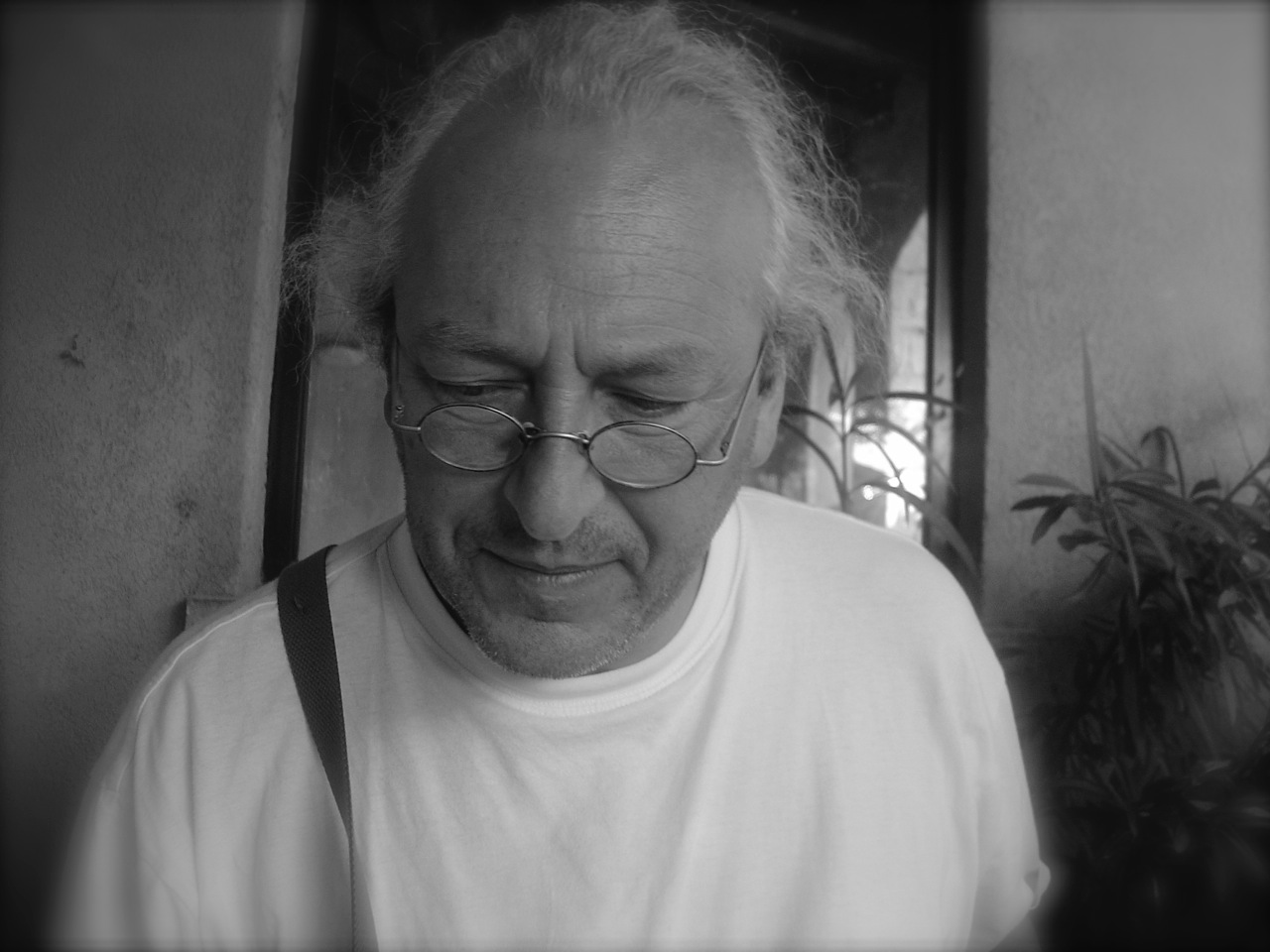
Paul Reniere

== Biography ==
Paul Reniere was born in Poperinge on November 23, 1956. He studied printmaking at the Saint-Lucas Academy for fine arts in Ghent where he graduated in 1980. In 1982 he becomes laureate for the “Gaverprijs” for painting and in 1982 he wins the Europa prize for painting. In 1981 he is appointed teacher of free graphics and painting at the Poperinge Academy of Art, a position he held until 2014 . Martine Depla was born in Ostend on December 29, 1954. She studied biology at Ghent University, but did not finish her studies. In 1991 she enrolls at the Poperinge Academy of Art where Paul Reniere becomes her teacher. In 1995 Martine Depla becomes laureate of the Louise Dehem prize for painting and in 1996 she wins the prize for painting in Harelbeke, Belgium. During the initial years of their relationship the artistic work of Paul Reniere and Martine Depla remains separate. They exhibit in their own name. In 1995 they present their work together for the first time under the name ‘Reniere&Depla’. Since then they make no distinction as to whom painted which work.

== Positioning ==
Their oeuvre consists of paintings (on wood panel and on canvas), drawings (on paper and carton) and sculpture in various materials (fabric, leather, wax and plaster). They paint with acrylic paint and build up their work with glaze layers. The white parts of their work (e.g. light) are being overpainted several times which gives them depth and makes them “shine”.

Professor and art philosopher Willem Elias described their work as exemplary of the neo-symbolic style, a term he created, whereby the photographic source material of the painter plays an important role. Art Critic Hans Theys wrote about the unique role light plays in most of their work:

“One of the most striking characteristics of these paintings is the way in which the light seems to appear from the depths and seems to be woven into the whole construction. The objects represented have a certain mistiness or instability to them, in spite of their being in the way. Indeed, our view of the reality invoked is often immediately blocked by walls; yet these are not real walls, not only as they have been painted, but also as they pose as a yielding, porous surface slowly corroded by thousands of incidents.”

Their style bears resemblance to several artists. Erik Rinckhout, journalist for the Belgian daily newspaper De Morgen compared their work to that of Léon Spilliaert, Xavier Mellery, Maurice Gilliams and Edgar Dégas.

In 2006 the Marlborough Fine Art (a London gallery) runs it’s ‘Summer Exhibition’ with work of Reniere&Depla. In 2009 they take part in ‘Voices Across the Plain: Flemish Artists in London’, an exhibition in Pitzhanger Manor (House and Gallery, London) showing the work of several Flemish artists. In 2009 curator and art critic Sven Vanderstichelen selects their work for the exhibition “Fading” at the museum of Ixelles, Brussels, with a.o. Luc Tuymans, Michaël Borremans, Koen Van den Broeck, Jan Van Imschoot, Bert De Beul, Robert De Vriendt.

In 2011 Reniere&Depla organize ‘La Part des Anges’, a group exhibition featuring 19 contemporary visual artists in an interbellum mansion ‘Villa de Olmen’, in Wieze, Belgium. Among represented artists were Berlinde De Bruyckere, Peter Buggenhout, Bert De Beul, Jan Van Imschoot, Marc Vanderleenen, Céline Butaye.

In 2012 they again invite four artists to Villa De Olmen, for the exhibition ‘Mais l’Aile ne fait pas l’Oiseau’: Johan Tahon, Tamara Van San, Rein Dufait and Sven Verhaeghe. Since 2012 there have been several exhibitions in S&H De Buck Gallery (Ghent, Belgium), De Queeste Art Gallery, and other galleries. In 2013 they took part in ‘The Gunshot’ an exhibition curated by Hans Theys in Marion de Canniére in Antwerp. Els Wuyts brings in ‘ La joie de se perdre’ a double exhibition in Wieze and Meigem, Belgium, featuring a.o. Renato Nicolodi, Dirk Braeckman, Anne Wenzel, Jasper Rigolle, Peter De Koninck, Piki and Liesbet Verschueren, Vaast Colson, Yves Velter, and Griet Teck. In 2014 they are requested by curator Wim Lambrecht to participate in ‘The Divided Body’, an exhibition in the Preachers Church of Louvain.

== Books ==
The oeuvre of Reniere&Depla has been compiled in three catalogs. In 2004 Reniere&Depla published a book under own management with texts of Joannes Késenne showing their work in the period 2000-2004. In 2009 ASP Editions issued the book ‘Reniere&Depla 2004-2009’. This catalog compiles their work from 2004 to 2009 and contains comments by Eleen Deprez, Hans Theys and Willem Elias. In 2014 the art publishing house Lannoo issued the book ‘Quatre Mains, Reniere&Depla 2009-2014’. It contains comments about the work of Reniere&Depla and about the way they cooperate, by Hans Theys en Eleen Deprez.

== Exhibitions ==
2014 'Quatre Mains', galerie s&h de buck, Ghent
2014 'The Divided Body', curator Wim Lambrecht, Preachers Church, Louvain
2013 'Eerste poging tot inventarisatie van de wolken', De Queeste Art Gallery, Abele
2013 'Vous n'avez pas honte d'être si beau', Le coin C Gallery, Knokke
2013 'The gunshot', Galerie Marion De Cannière, Antwerp
2013 'Paradise/Paradis/Paradijs', galerie s&h de buck, Ghent
2013 'La joie de se perdre', Villa de Olmen en d' Apostrof, Meigem
2012 'Le temps de réponse', s&h De Buck gallery, Ghent
2012 'Portret / Zelfportret' Quest 21, Brussels
2012‘Mais l'aile ne fait pas l'oiseau’ Villa de Olmen, Wieze
2011 ‘Salon Blanc’ Ostend, Belgium
2011 'Que chose soit!' Quest 21, Brussels
2011 ‘La part des anges’ Villa de olmen, Wieze, Belgium
2011 'Mystieke stemmen' Artist, Genk
2010 De Queeste, Art Gallery, Watou, Belgium
2010 ‘Labomax’ Ostend, Belgium
2010 ‘Nighthawks’ With, Kortrijk, Belgium
2010 ‘Oevertude’ ShDebuck galerie, Ghent, Belgium
2010 ‘Lineart’ The Border, ShDebuck galerie, Ghent, Belgium
2009 Revemuseum, Amsterdam, Netherlands
2009 ‘Locus Amoenus’ S.H.De Buckgallery, Ghent, Belgium
2009 ‘De breekbaarheid van de schaduw’Quest 21, Brussels, Belgium
2009 ‘Across the plain’ PM gallery & house, London, UK
2009 ‘Fading’ Museum Elsene, Brussels, Belgium, curator Sven Vanderstichelen
2008 ‘l’Enclyclopédie des autres’A&Agallery, Stevoort, Belgium
2008 ‘Locus amoenus’ en’De breekbaarheid van de schaduw’CC, Hasselt, Belgium
2008 ‘Locus amoenus’ Hof van Ryhove, Ghent, Belgium
2007 ‘L’encyclopédie des autres’, De Queeste, Art Gallery, Watou, Belgium
2006 ‘Summer Exhibition’ Marlborough Fine Art, London, UK
2006 ‘Voorbij het zwart’ Be-Part, platform voor actuele kunt, Waregem,

== Distinctions ==
Internationale prijs hoppeland voor Schilderkunst, eervolle vermelding, Poperinge, Belgium 1998
Prijs voor Schilderkunst, Harelbeke, Belgium 1996(MD)
Louise Dehemprijs voor Schilderkunst, laureaat, Ieper, Belgium 1995(MD)
Stimulans 85, eervolle vermelding, Kortrijk, Belgium 1985
Prix international d’art contemporain, Monte-Carlo, France 1983
Godecharles art price, Brussels, Belgium 1983
Medaille voor Cultuur, K.Poma, 1983
Prijs voor Schilderkunst, eerste premie, Harelbeke, Belgium 1983
Europaprijs voor Schilderkunst, bronzen medaille, Ostend, Belgium 1982
Gaverprijs voor Schilderkunst, laureaat, Waregem, Belgium 1982
