= Lunar C =

- Born: Jake Brook; 21 June 1990 (age 35)
- Origin: Bradford, West Yorkshire, England
- Genres: Hip hop
- Occupation: Rapper
- Years active: 2006–present

Jake Brook (born 21 June 1990), better known by his stage name Lunar C, is an English rapper.

Between his rap battles in Don't Flop, Lunar C has accumulated over eight million hits and was awarded trophies for 'Best Newcomer' and 'Performance of the Year' within the league in 2011.

His widespread popularity has led to multiple appearances on the media channel SB.TV, and an appearance on British singer-songwriter Labrinth's EP, Atomic. His latest mixtape, Breakdown Rebuild, also features collaborations with UK artists Dirty Dike and Tommy Dockerz.

He is in a crew called 'Fly Tippers' whose logo also features on designs for Boisht Clothing. Other members of the group are PTRM, Minas, Wyde Boi and Chief Wigs.

== Career ==
=== 2010: The Lunar CD ===
The Lunar CD was the first EP released by Lunar C, produced by Sinoptic Music in 2010. On 31 July 2012, it saw release to the UK iTunes store. The EP has one single, titled "StillSkint".

=== 2012–present: SewerSideSex and collaborations ===
Lunar C's mixtape SewerSideSex was released for free on 21 September 2012, also produced by Sinoptic Music. It features collaborations with UK artists Dot Rotten and JME, and contains the two singles "Mobstacles" (feat. Dot Rotten) and "Jesus Swag". Both tracks have had significant airplay over Charlie Sloth's Hood Heat Chart on BBC Radio 1Xtra.

In August 2012, Lunar C also appeared amongside Labrinth, Maxsta, Faiz, Marger and Yungen on Labrinth's single "Upcomers Anthem" for SB.TV.

In early December 2012, Lunar C announced on his verified Twitter page that he would be appearing on Labrinth's upcoming EP Atomic. On Christmas Day 2012, the EP was released, with Lunar C appearing on the third track, "No Prisoners" with Faiz, Maxsta and Marger.

In early 2014, Lunar C featured on Australian artist 360's album Utopia on the single "Sixavelli". In September 2014 he joined 360's Futopia tour as a supporting act performing in some of Australia's biggest cities.

=== 2019: Very Important ===
On 10 November 2019, Lunar C announced that he would be releasing his second studio album, Very Important, on 29 November 2019. In the months after his album, Lunar C did several shows across the UK. During this time, he supported The Game during his tour of the UK.

== Discography ==
Mixtapes

- 2012: SewerSideSex
- 2015: Breakdown Rebuild
- 2016: WhyAmIEvenAliveRightNow
- 2017: Jake
- 2021: “The Chaos Theory Vol 1”

EPs

- 2010: The Lunar CD
- 2013: Good Times and Dead Brain Cells
- 2014: Not Good at Life

Albums

- 2018: Dirtbrain
- 2019: Very Important
- 2020: Pink Lagoon
- 2022: Most High
