= Reprezent =

Coordinates: 51.4635°N 0.1123°W

- London; United Kingdom
- Broadcast area: Greater London
- Frequencies: FM: 107.3 MHz; DAB: 9A Central London

Programming
- Format: Grime, hip hop, dance music, alternative, talk

History
- First air date: 18 April 2011; 15 years ago

Links
- Webcast: www.reprezentradio.org.uk
- Website: www.reprezent.org.uk

Reprezent 107.3 FM is a youth-led radio station based in Brixton, South London that reaches young people aged between 18 and 30.

== History ==
The station has its origin in a one-month restricted service licence focusing on youth issues including gun and knife crime, which was a successful broadcast that enabled them to apply for a community radio licence. Reprezent was awarded a community licence in 2010, and from April 2011 has been broadcasting live across London.

Playing R&B, grime, hip hop, dance music, and alternative music, it champions youth culture. Reprezent provides a platform for young people to showcase their talents but also to discuss social issues that affect them. It aims to challenge youth stereotypes and help young people better represent themselves in society. Their licence agreement says that:

The station will give young people in south London access to their own platform for discussing issues that matter to them, representing their views, and dispelling negative stereotypes; and feature music they like, and which is rarely played on mainstream services.

In 2016, Reprezent started broadcasting on DAB in London alongside their FM frequency.

Reprezent broadcasts from three converted shipping containers in the Pop Brixton park.

== Programming ==
As part of the station's community broadcasting remit, it is expected to provide social gain initiatives. Reprezent provides unique services to London's young population ranging from radio training and media training to providing a gateway for young musicians to develop their music and do live performances on air. Reprezent also work with Tate Britain, ICA and a range of music labels, PR agencies and management companies to provide a range of opportunities for young people. Reprezent also works with youth-centric brands such as Nike, Apple, Parklife, Lovebox, Nando's, Converse, Boiler Room, NFL, MLB and many more.

In March 2017, Reprezent collaborated with The xx, Young Turks and XL Recordings to programme a week of radio that saw shows produced with artists ranging from Warpaint, Goldie and Novelist, to Kurupt FM, Jehnny Beth from Savages and J Hus.

The station has over 100 presenters and radio shows, that broadcast all original content from 9 am through until 3 am, with the rest of the night being their user-curated playlist.

== Music ==
Reprezent's playlist is managed entirely by its presenters and all music is playlisted solely on the strength of its quality. All presenters submit music that is then decided on by a panel of presenters and volunteers.

Over the last few years, Reprezent's 'hothouse' approach to finding new talent has been instrumental in launching many successful careers. Past presenters include Novelist, Stormzy, Lady Leshurr, Remi Burgz, Henrie Kwushue, Jamz Supernova, Jeremiah Asiamah, Snoochie Shy, Kenny Allstar and many more. The recent 'Grime n Reason' album released through Sony ATV saw Reprezent bring 14 emerging artists together and produce a collection of music specifically for licensing to TV and Film - the first time a project like this has been undertaken for sync.

With a remit to provide a platform for young people in south London, Reprezent playlists UK artists only and regularly uncovers new music that then goes on to become critically acclaimed by other platforms. From the BBC Sound of 2017, seven of the acts were uncovered by Reprezent, including Ray BLK, Nadia Rose and Jorja Smith. This focus on south London's music scene has helped raise the profile of a wide range of artists.
