= Basil Beattie =

British artist

Basil Beattie RA (born 1935) is a British artist, whose work revolves around abstraction and is known for its emotive and gestural forms.

Born in West Hartlepool, County Durham, Beattie attended the West Hartlepool College of Art from 1950 until 1955. He continued his education at the Royal Academy schools from 1957 until 1961. He then began a long teaching career: during the 1980s and 1990s, Beattie taught at Goldsmiths College in London. He retired from the role in 1998, spending a further year as assessor at the Chelsea School of Art.

Beattie's unusual use of hieroglyphs with signs and characters arranged in a cellular format was displayed with a 1986 production called Legend. 10 ft by 12 ft its originality and multi-layered appearance was a hallmark of a painter who had many one-man solo exhibitions, as well as the normal group shows, including a significant event at Curwen Gallery in 1990. He was shortlisted for the Jerwood Painting Prize in both 1998 and 2001, in addition to the Charles Woolaston Prize in 2000. An exhibition of paintings produced from the 1990s was held at Tate Britain in 2007 and his works are part of the Tate permanent collection.

Beattie lived in the 1970s with Mavis Cheek, later a successful novelist, and has a daughter by her.
