= Rogue Films =

- Company type: Production Company
- Industry: Film & Commercial Production
- Founder: David van der Gaag & Charlie Crompton
- Headquarters: London, United Kingdom
- Website: www.roguefilms.co.uk

Rogue is a commercial, TV, music video and documentary production company, originally organised under the name of Drum Films in 1974, as part of The Moving Picture Company. In 1983 Michael Green purchased both companies, making them part of his Carlton Communications. Renamed Rogue Films in 1992, the company became an independent entity in 1998, and represents award-winning British directors, such as Academy Award winner Kevin Macdonald (One Day in September, Last King of Scotland, Life in a Day) and Grammy Award-winning Sam Brown (music videos for Adele, Jay-Z and Foo Fighters).

In the field of commercials Rogue has won many awards over the years from festivals such as the Cannes Lions, British Arrows, and Creative Circle.

== Commercials ==
Rogue has created numerous award-winning commercials for clients as varied as Audi, Apple, Adidas, British Airways, BBC, Coca-Cola, Dyson, McDonald's, Google, Heinz, HSBC, NatWest, Nike, Levi's, Lloyds, Phillips, Virgin Atlantic and Virgin Media.

== Music videos ==
Rogue has created numerous videos for artist such as Adele, Jay-Z, Jon Hopkins, and Foo Fighters.

== Online content ==
Rogue has created and produced online content and interactive films for companies such as Ford, Jaguar, Lexus and Philips.

== Film and television ==
Rogue's film and television division has produced various shorts including Roundabout Five (2005) featuring Martin Freeman, Lena Headey, and Jodhi May; and Occasional Strong (2002) with Daniel Craig. Documentaries include 11M (in post production), and The Manager written by Nick Moorcroft.
