= Susie Orbach =

British psychotherapist and author

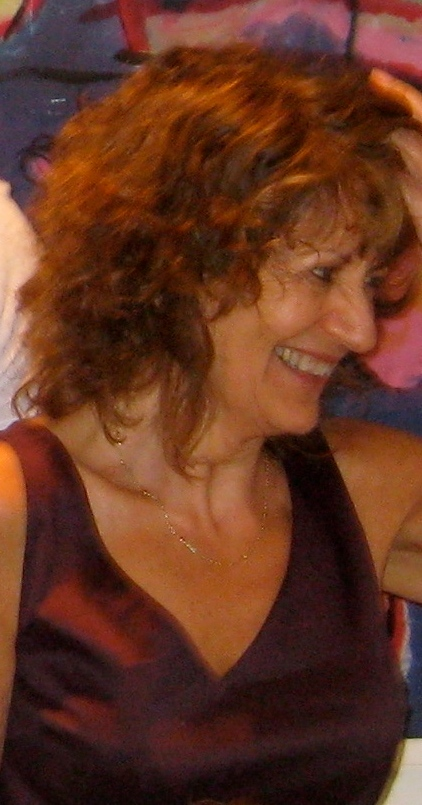
- Born: 6 November 1946 (age 79); London, England
- Occupations: Psychotherapist, psychoanalyst, writer, social critic
- Spouse: Jeanette Winterson (m. 2015; sep. 2019)
- Partner(s): Joseph Schwartz (1968–2015)
- Children: 2
- Parent: Maurice Orbach (father)

Susie Orbach (born 6 November 1946) is a British psychotherapist, psychoanalyst, writer and social critic. Her first book, Fat is a Feminist Issue, analysed the psychology of dieting and over-eating in women, and she has campaigned against media pressure on girls to feel dissatisfied with their physical appearance. She was married to the author Jeanette Winterson. She is honoured in BBC'S 100 Women in 2013 and 2014 and was elected a Fellow of the Royal Academy of Literature in 2019. She was the therapist to Diana, Princess of Wales during the 1990s.

== Background ==
Orbach was born in London in 1946 into a Jewish family, and was brought up in Chalk Farm, North London. Her mother was an American teacher, and her father the British Labour MP Maurice Orbach. She won a scholarship to North London Collegiate School. Despite being expelled at the age of 15, Orbach went on to study Russian History at the School of Slavonic Studies, but left in her final year. She then moved to New York to study law, but did not complete her training, She enrolled instead on the Women's Studies course at Richmond College, City University of New York, graduating with a BA (Highest Hons.) in 1972. Reminiscing about her time there in the Times Educational Supplement 30 years later, Orbach described the course as "concerning contemporary ideas, feminism, history – all things that were just right for me. It was like an Alternative University." She subsequently gained a Master's degree in Social Welfare from the State University of New York at Stony Brook in 1974 and a PhD in Psychoanalysis from University College London in 2001.

== Career ==
With Luise Eichenbaum, Orbach created the Women's Therapy Centre in 1976 and the Women's Therapy Centre Institute, a training institute in New York, in 1981. She has been a consultant for The World Bank, the NHS and Unilever and was co-originator of the Dove Campaign for Real Beauty.

Orbach is member of the steering group for the Campaign for Body Confidence, co-founded by Lynne Featherstone and Jo Swinson in March 2010.

=== Scholarship ===
Orbach has been a visiting scholar at the New School for Social Research in New York and for 10 years was visiting professor at the London School of Economics. She was chair of the Relational School in the UK. Orbach is a convener of Anybody, an organisation that campaigns for body diversity. She is a co-founder and board member of Antidote, which works for emotional literacy. Orbach is also a co-founder of Psychotherapists and Counsellors for Social Responsibility. She lectures and broadcasts extensively world-wide and has been profiled in numerous newspapers, such as The Guardian.

=== Practice ===
Orbach has a clinical practice and sees both individuals and couples in London.

== Personal life ==
Orbach's relationship with Joseph Schwartz, the father of her two children, ended after more than 30 years.

According to writer Jeanette Winterson, whom she married in 2015, Orbach "calls herself post-heterosexual". They separated in 2019.

== Works ==
Orbach's first book, Fat is a Feminist Issue, brought the problems of women's relationships to their bodies and their eating to public consciousness. In this book she looked at the unconscious meanings of fat and thin and why people eat when they aren't physically hungry. She also developed ways to overcome compulsive eating. Her other books addressing food and the body are Fat is a Feminist Issue II, Hunger Strike, On Eating and her latest book Bodies. In Bodies, she proposed new theory on how we acquire a bodily sense of self. The book includes case studies of amputees and children who have been fostered or adopted and offers a critique of the beauty, diet, style and pharmaceutical industries as well as current thinking on the 'obesity' crisis.

Another important area of her work relates to the dynamics in relationships. What do Women Want (written with Luise Eichenbaum) discusses the dynamics in couples, especially heterosexual ones, and explores issues of dependency and the impact of the mother/daughter, mother/son relationship on an adult's sense of self. In this book Orbach & Eichenbaum lay the foundations for more emotionally democratic intimate relationships, Bittersweet, now re-titled Between Women, (also written with Luise Eichenbaum) focuses on friendships, relationships at work and love affairs, between women. The book describes the merged attachments that can occur between women & the struggle to achieve separated attachments. In Understanding Women, Orbach and Eichenbaum theorise women's psychology from the perspective of their work at the Women's Therapy Centre and introduce the concept of 'the little girl inside'.

The Impossibility of Sex was a new departure. It is a collection of imagined stories from therapy, written from the perspective of the therapist. The stories are interwoven with theory and a discussion of the key psychological concepts, as well as a frank discussion of the therapist's experience. Although these are imagined cases, they tell a truth about the daily struggles, ruminations and experience of being a therapist.

=== False bodies ===
Susie Orbach saw the false self as an overdevelopment (under parental pressure) of certain aspects of the self at the expense of other aspects — of the full potential of the self — producing thereby an abiding distrust of what emerges spontaneously from the individual himself or herself. Orbach went on to extend Donald Winnicott's account of how environmental failure can lead to an inner splitting of mind and body, so as to cover the idea of the False Body — a falsified sense of one's own body. Orbach saw the female false body in particular as built upon identifications with others, at the cost of an inner sense of authenticity and reliability. Breaking up a monolithic but false body-sense in the process of therapy could allow for the emergence of a range of authentic (even if often painful) body feelings in the patient.

=== Journalism ===
For 10 years Orbach had a column in The Guardian on emotions in public and private life. These have been compiled into two volumes: What's Really Going on Here and Towards Emotional Literacy. She still writes for newspapers and magazines and campaigns vigorously on many fronts.

=== Books ===
- Orbach, Susie (2018). In Therapy - The Unfolding Story London: Profile Books.
- Orbach, Susie (2016). In Therapy London: Profile Books.
- Orbach, Susie (1978). Fat is a feminist issue: the anti-diet guide to permanent weight loss. New York: Paddington Press. ISBN 9780448227856.
- Orbach, Susie (1982). Fat is a feminist issue II: a program to conquer compulsive eating. New York: Berkley Books. ISBN 9780425093870.
- Orbach, Susie; Eichenbaum, Luise (1983). Understanding women: a feminist psychoanalytic approach. New York: Basic Books. ISBN 9780465088645.
- Orbach, Susie; Eichenbaum, Luise (1983). What do women want: exploding the myth of dependency. New York: Coward-McCann. ISBN 9780698112100.
- Orbach, Susie (1986). Hunger strike: the anorectic's struggle as a metaphor for our age. New York: Norton. ISBN 9780393022780.
- Orbach, Susie; Eichenbaum, Luise (1987). Bittersweet: facing up to feelings of love, envy, and competition in women's friendships. London: Century. ISBN 9780712614764.

Published in the US as: Orbach, Susie; Eichenbaum, Luise (1988). Between women: love, envy, and competition in women's friendships. New York, N.Y.: Viking. ISBN 9780670811410.

- Orbach, Susie (1994). What's really going on here. London: Virago. ISBN 9781853817984.
- Orbach, Susie (1999). Towards emotional literacy. London: Virago. ISBN 9781860496547.
- Orbach, Susie (2005). The impossibility of sex. London: Karnac. ISBN 9781780495842.
- Orbach, Susie (2002). On eating. London: Penguin. ISBN 9780141007519.
- Orbach, Susie (2009). Bodies. New York: Picador. ISBN 9780312427207.
- Orbach, Susie; Appignanesi, Lisa; Holmes, Rachel (2013). Fifty shades of feminism. London: Virago. ISBN 9781844089451.

=== Chapters in books ===
- Orbach, Susie (2013), "The commercialisation of girls' bodies", in Wild, Jim (ed.), Exploiting childhood: how fast food, material obsession and porn culture are creating new forms of child abuse, London: Jessica Kingsley Publishers, pp. 110–115, ISBN 9780857007421.
- Susie Orbach (2019). "Chapter 9: Climate sorrow". In Extinction Rebellion (ed.). This Is Not a Drill: An Extinction Rebellion Handbook. Penguin Books. pp. 65–68. ISBN 9780141991443.
