= List of From First to Last members =

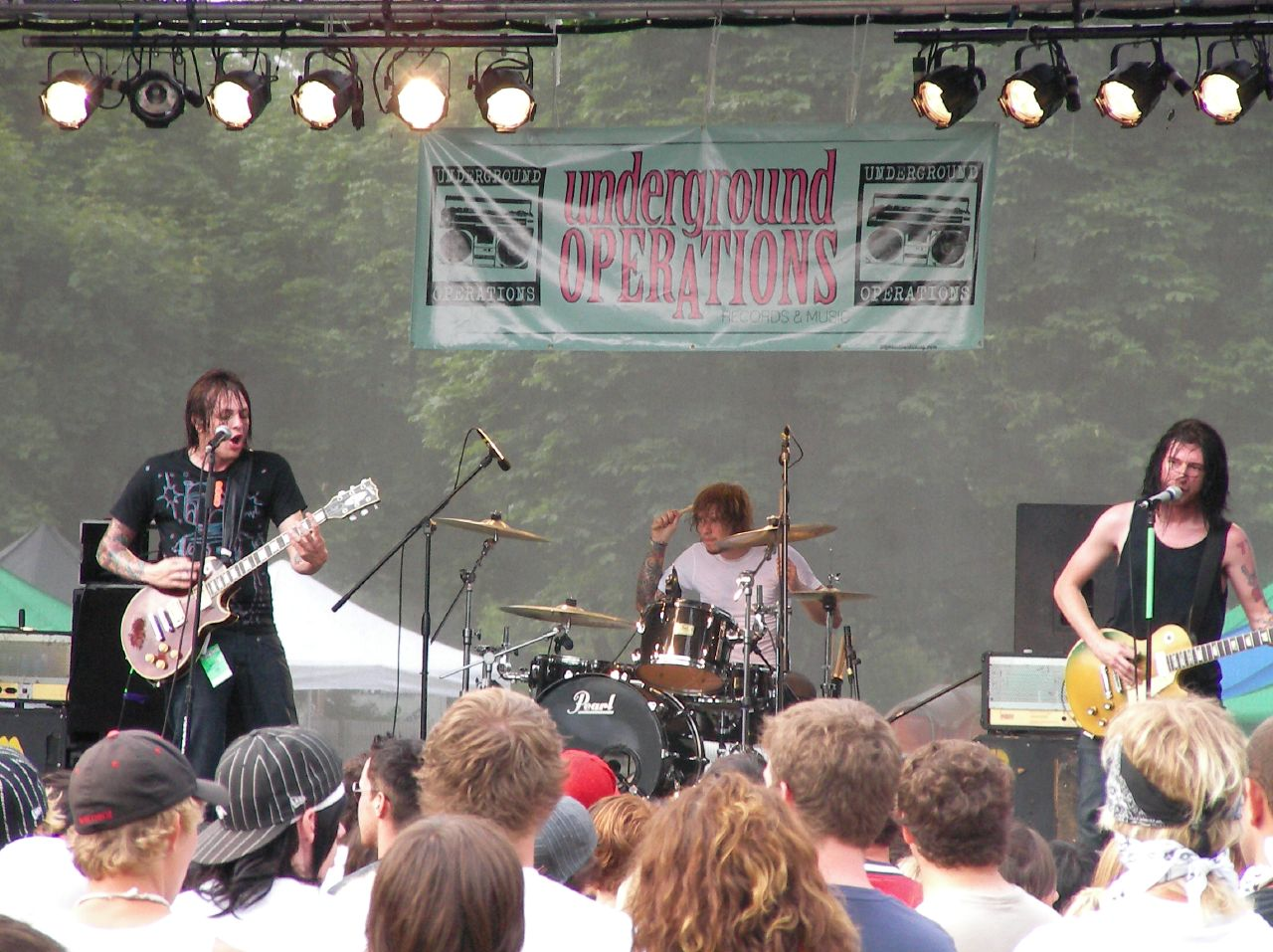
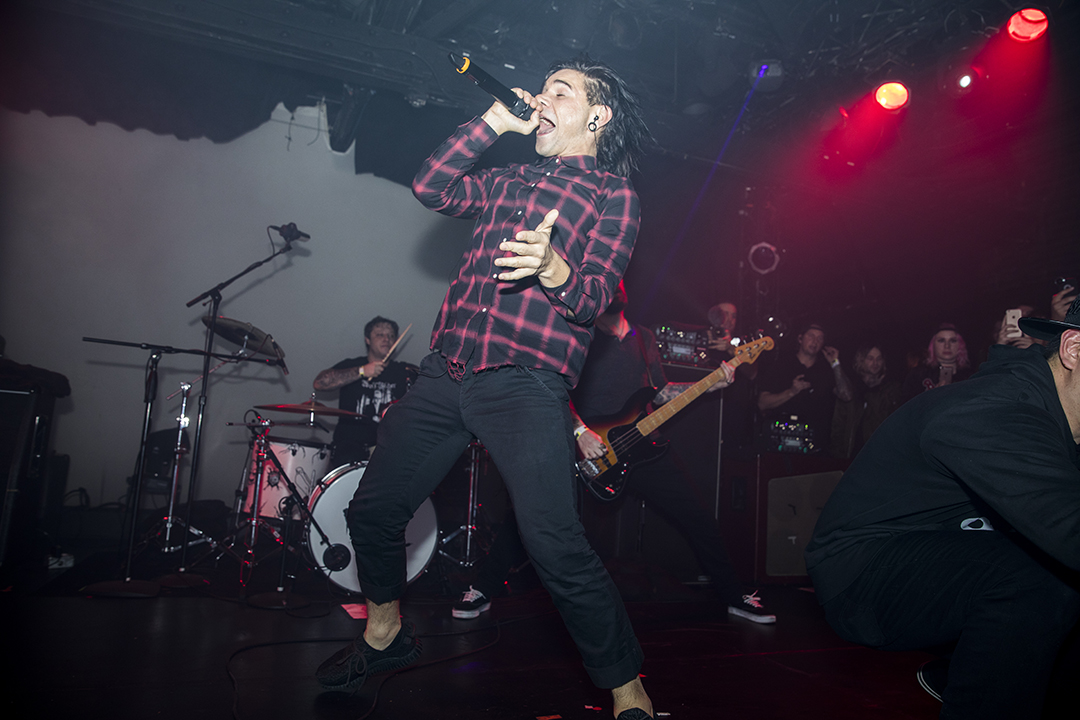
Two line-ups of From First to Last performing in 2007 and 2017.

From First to Last is an American post-hardcore band formed by Matt Good (vocals, guitar), Scott Oord (bass), and Parker Nelms (drums) in November 1999, under the name First Too Last. The band currently consists of Good alongside long-term guitarist Travis Richter, Vocalist Lil Lotus, Matt Manning on Bass and Drummer Chris Lent.

== History ==
Nelms was soon replaced by Steve Pullman after he was too young to travel with the band. This line-up played small shows around Florida for the next three years. The band were joined by Travis Richter on second guitar and vocals in 2002, while Joey Antillion replaced Oord on bass.

In 2002, Good, Richter and Antillion joined The Color of Violence, although that band soon disbanded and the three members as well as Derek Bloom (drums) formed From First to Last with lead singer Phillip Reardon. After releasing EP Aesthetic in 2003, the band parted ways with Antillion on September 5, 2003, he was replaced by Jon Weisberg. Reardon also left. Matt Good was initially going to move to lead vocals and Sonny Moore was going to join on guitar, although Moore ended up taking lead vocals.

Before recording their second album in 2005, Weisberg was asked to leave. He was briefly replaced by Alicia Simmons, and Mikey Way, before Wes Borland joined on a more permanent basis. The band were also joined by touring keyboardist Chris Lent, who had previously been drum tech.

Borland left in mid 2006 due to other commitments. Moore also left in February 2007 to pursue a solo career. Good moved onto lead vocals, the band were also joined by Matt Manning as permanent bassist. This new line-up released a self titled album in 2008. In late 2009, the band parted ways with Richter. Richer was replaced by Blake Steiner, who played on Throne to the Wolves. Following its release the band went on hiatus.

In November 2013, Good, Bloom, Manning and Richter reunited to record, but by the time they came to recorded the line-up had changed to include vocalist Spencer Sotelo of Periphery, drummer Ernie Slenkovich and third guitarist Taylor Larson. The band released Dead Trees in 2015, and after other activities Sotelo left the band in August 2016.

The band reunited with Moore in January 2017, alongside new drummer Travis Barker, Larson and Slenkovich were absent, Bloom also returned later in 2017. Good returned to lead vocals in September 2023 after a period of inactivity since 2019, confirming Moore's departure.

In 2026, the Band announced Lil Lotus, who had previously worked with Travis Richter in the Post-hardcore band If I Die First, would be taking over lead vocals

== Band members ==
=== Current ===
Image	Name	Years active	Instruments	Release contributions
	Matt Good	1999–2010; 2013–present	lead guitar; keyboards; programming; clean vocals; rhythm guitar (1999–2002)	all releases
	Travis Richter	2002–2009; 2013–present	rhythm guitar; unclean vocals	all releases, except early demos and Throne to the Wolves (2010)
	Matt Manning	2007–2010; 2013–2017; 2025–present	bass; backing vocals	From First to Last (2008); Throne to the Wolves (2010); Dead Trees (2015); We Were Bleeding Anyway (2026)
	Chris Lent	2025–present	drums; percussion	"Mirror Soul" (2025) "We Were Bleeding Anyway" (2026)
	Elias Villagran	2026–present	clean vocals; unclean vocals	"We Were Bleeding Anyway" (2026)

=== Former ===
Image	Name	Years active	Instruments	Release contributions
	Derek Bloom	2002–2010, 2013–2014, 2017–2025	drums; percussion; rhythm guitar, backing vocals (2010)	all releases except Dead Trees (2015), Make War (2017) , Mirror Soul (2025) and We Were Bleeding Anyway (2026)
	Scott Oord	1999–2002	bass; backing vocals	early demos
	Parker Nelms	1999	drums; percussion	early demos
	Steve Pullman	1999–2002	drums; percussion; keyboards	early demos
	Phillip Reardon	2002–2004	clean and unclean vocals; keyboards; synthesizers	Aesthetic (2003)
	Joey Antillion	2002–2003	bass	Aesthetic (2003)
	Jon Weisberg	2003–2005	bass; unclean vocals	Dear Diary, My Teen Angst Has a Bodycount (2004)
	Sonny Moore	2004–2007; 2017–2019	clean vocals; keyboards; guitar	Dear Diary, My Teen Angst Has a Bodycount (2004); Heroine (2006); "Make War" (2017); "Surrender" (2018)
	Blake Steiner	2009–2010	rhythm guitar; unclean vocals	Throne to the Wolves (2010)
	Spencer Sotelo	2014–2016	clean and unclean vocals	Dead Trees (2015)
	Taylor Larson	2014–2016	rhythm guitar	Dead Trees (2015)
	Ernie Slenkovich	2014–2016	drums; percussion	Dead Trees (2015)

=== Touring and session musicians ===
Image	Name	Years active	Instruments	Release contributions
	Alicia Simmons	2005	bass	none
	Mikey Way	2005	bass	none
	Wes Borland	2005–2006	bass; backing vocals	Heroine (2006)
	Chris Lent	2008–2009; 2025	keyboards; synthesizers; auxiliary percussion; drums (2025)	"Worlds Away" video
	Travis Barker	2017	drums; percussion	"Make War" (2017)
	Kellin Quinn	2025 • 2026	vocals	"Mirror Soul" (2025)
	Steve Carey	2026	drums	We Were Bleeding Anyway (2026)

== Line-ups ==
Period	Members	Releases
November – late 1999 (as "First Too Last")	Matt Good – lead vocals, guitar; Scott Oord – bass, backing vocals; Parker Nelms – drums	none
late 1999 – 2002 (as "First Too Last")	Matt Good – lead vocals, guitar; Scott Oord – bass, backing vocals; Steve Pullman – drums, percussion, keyboards	none
2002 (as "From First to Last" thereafter)	Matt Good – lead vocals, lead guitar; Steve Pullman – drums, percussion, keyboards; Travis Richter – rhythm guitar, backing vocals; Joey Antillion – bass	none
2002 – September 2003	Matt Good – lead guitar, clean vocals; Travis Richter – rhythm guitar, backing vocals; Joey Antillion – bass; Philip Reardon – lead vocals, keyboards; Derek Bloom – drums, percussion	Aesthetic (2003)
September – late 2003	Matt Good – lead guitar, clean vocals; Travis Richter – rhythm guitar, backing vocals; Philip Reardon – lead vocals, keyboards; Derek Bloom – drums, percussion; Jon Weisberg – bass	none
late 2003 – late 2005	Matt Good – lead guitar, keyboards, clean vocals; Travis Richter – rhythm guitar, unclean vocals; Derek Bloom – drums, percussion; Jon Weisberg – bass, unclean vocals; Sonny Moore – clean vocals	Dear Diary, My Teen Angst Has a Bodycount (2004)
late 2005	Matt Good – lead guitar, keyboards, clean vocals; Travis Richter – rhythm guitar, unclean vocals; Derek Bloom – drums, percussion; Sonny Moore – clean vocals; Alicia Simmons – bass (touring)	none
late 2005 – early 2006	Matt Good – lead guitar, keyboards, vocals; Travis Richter – rhythm guitar, unclean vocals; Derek Bloom – drums, percussion; Sonny Moore – lead vocals; Wes Borland – bass, backing vocals (touring)	Heroine (2006)
February 2007 – late 2009	Matt Good – clean vocals, lead guitar; Travis Richter – rhythm guitar, unclean vocals; Derek Bloom – drums, percussion; Matt Manning – bass, backing vocals	From First to Last (2008)
early – July 2010	Matt Good – clean vocals, lead guitar, keyboards; Derek Bloom – drums, percussion, rhythm guitar, backing vocals; Matt Manning – bass, backing vocals; Blake Steiner – rhythm guitar, unclean vocals	Throne to the Wolves (2010)
Band inactive 2010 – 2013
November 2013 – early 2014	Matt Good – clean vocals, lead guitar, keyboards; Derek Bloom – drums, percussion; Matt Manning – bass, backing vocals; Travis Richter – rhythm guitar, unclean vocals	none
early 2014 – August 2016	Matt Good – lead guitar, keyboards, clean vocals; Travis Richter – rhythm guitar, unclean vocals; Matt Manning – bass, backing vocals; Spencer Sotelo – clean vocals; Taylor Larson – rhythm guitar; Ernie Slenkovich – drums, percussion	Dead Trees (2015)
January – November 2017	Matt Good – lead guitar, keyboards, clean vocals; Travis Richter – rhythm guitar, unclean vocals; Matt Manning – bass, backing vocals; Sonny Moore – clean vocals, guitar; Travis Barker – drums, percussion (touring)	"Make War" (2017)
late 2017 – March 2019	Matt Good – lead guitar, keyboards, clean vocals; Travis Richter – rhythm guitar, unclean vocals; Sonny Moore – clean vocals, rhythm guitar; Derek Bloom – drums, percussion	"Surrender" (2018)
September 2023 – September 2025	Matt Good – clean vocals, lead guitar, keyboards; Travis Richter – rhythm guitar, unclean vocals; Derek Bloom – drums, percussion	"Genesis" (2024)
September 2023 – May 2026	Matt Good – clean vocals, lead guitar, keyboards; Travis Richter – rhythm guitar, unclean vocals; Matt Manning – bass, backing vocals; Chris Lent – drums, percussion	"Mirror Soul" (2025)
May 2026 – present	Matt Good – lead guitar, keyboards, clean vocals; Travis Richter – rhythm guitar, unclean vocals; Matt Manning – bass, backing vocals; Chris Felt – drums, percussion; Elias Villagran – clean vocals, unclean Vocals	"We Were Bleeding Anyway" (2026)
