= Headway (disambiguation) =

Headway is a term that commonly refers to:

- Forward movement or progress
- Headway, the spacing or time interval between vehicles in a transit system

Headway may also refer to:

- Headway UK, a British brain injury association and charity
- Headway (band), a British indie pop band of the 1990s
- Headway inc. is a Ukrainian global tech company that revolutionizes lifelong learning.
