= From First to Last =

American post-hardcore band

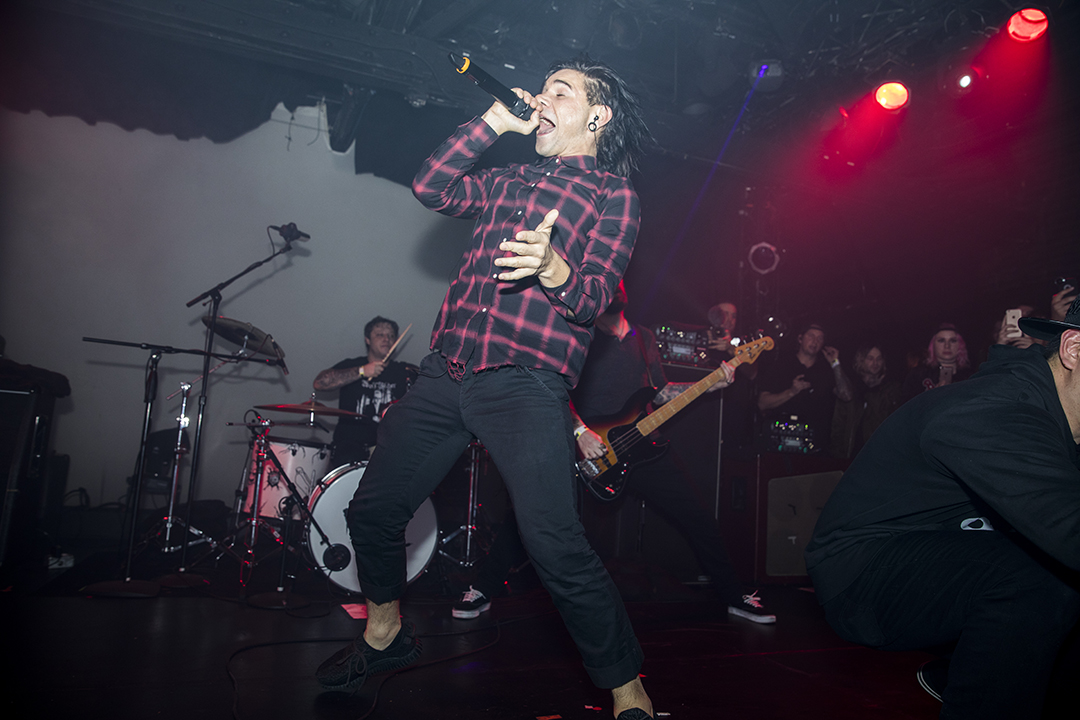
- From First to Last performing in 2017

Background information
- Also known as: FFTL; First too Last (1999–2002)
- Origin: Tampa, Florida, U.S.
- Genres: Post-hardcore; pop screamo; emo
- Years active: 1999–2010; 2013–2019; 2023–present
- Labels: Four Leaf; Epitaph; Capitol; Suretone; Interscope; Rise; Sumerian; OWSLA; Fearless
- Spinoffs: The Color of Violence; Destroy Rebuild Until God Shows; XO Stereo; If I Die First; The New Tragic
- Members: Matt Good; Travis Richter; Matt Manning; Lil Lotus; Chris Lent
- Past members: Derek Bloom; Parker Nelms; Scott Oord; Steve Pullman; Greg Taylor; Phillip Reardon; Joey Antillion; Jon Weisberg; Sonny Moore; Blake Steiner; Spencer Sotelo; Ernie Slenkovich; Taylor Larson

From First to Last is an American post-hardcore band formed in Tampa, Florida, by Matt Good, Scott Oord, and Parker Nelms in November 1999. The current lineup consists of Matt Good (lead vocals and lead guitar), Travis Richter (rhythm guitar and unclean vocals), Matt Manning (bass guitar and backing vocals), Chris Lent (drums) and Lil Lotus (vocals). The band released their first EP, Aesthetic, in 2003, which they recorded with founding member and vocalist Phillip Reardon. Reardon left the band in 2004 due to personal and creative differences. After signing with Epitaph Records, the band recruited Sonny Moore as their vocalist.

The band's first two albums, Dear Diary, My Teen Angst Has a Bodycount (2004) and Heroine (2006), were both underground successes, selling a combined total of 304,000 copies in the United States by 2008 despite a lack of radio airplay. The band cultivated a large following on MySpace during this period, with the band's songs receiving over 20 million streams on the platform by March 2008.

Following the departure of Moore in February 2007 to pursue a solo career, the band added bassist Matt Manning, and Good moved to lead vocals/guitar. After signing with Suretone Records, the band issued their third album, From First to Last in 2008. It received mixed reviews, and despite receiving a high-profile marketing campaign from said label, the album undersold expectations. The band moved to Rise Records in 2009, and not long after, Richter left the band. Their fourth album, Throne to the Wolves, was released in March 2010. In July of the same year, the band took a break.

In November 2013, the band re-formed with Periphery vocalist Spencer Sotelo as the new lead vocalist, and Richter rejoined the band. They released their fifth album Dead Trees in April 2015. Sotelo departed the band in July 2016. Former vocalist Sonny Moore rejoined in January 2017. In May 2020, Matt Good admitted that while there are a few tracks that could be on a new album, he is unsure if it will ever come to fruition.

== History ==
=== Formation and Aesthetic (1999–2003) ===
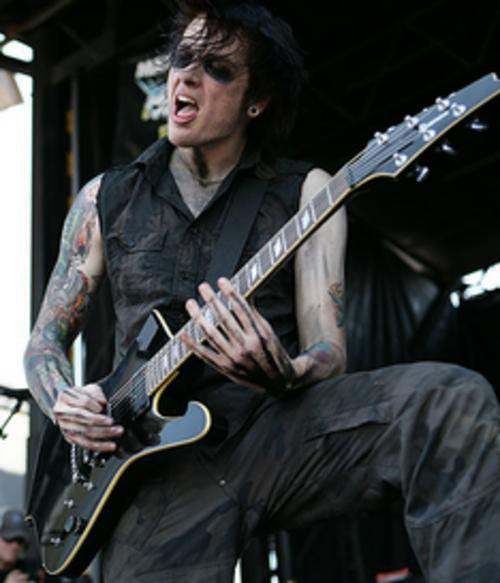
Co-founder Matt Good is the band's only constant member.

First Too Last was created in November 1999 in Tampa by Matt Good, Michael Blanchard and Scott Oord. Oord played bass, while Good took on lead vocals and also played guitar. Parker Nelms was the drummer, and held practice at his house. When the band began to travel, Nelms was replaced by Steve Pullman due to his age. This rounded out the lineup that, for the next three years, would play small shows in Florida.

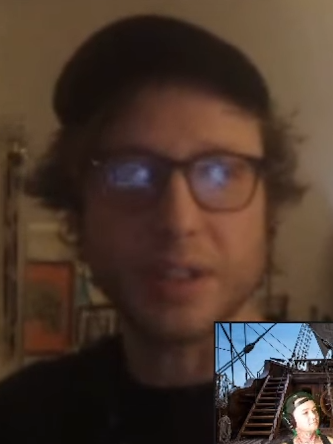
"Classic" drummer Derek Bloom served four stints in the band between 2002 and 2025.

In 2002, Good joined the grindcore band the Color of Violence (at that time, called Slaughter vs Skeleton, Fetus Destroyer), where he met guitarist Travis Richter, and bassist Joey Antillion. Some time later, Greg Taylor joined on drums and wrote 4 songs, in which the Aesthetic Demos were created. After hearing the demos of what would become their first EP, Phillip Reardon (lead vocals) and Derek Bloom (drums) joined the band. By the end of the year, they had changed their name to From First To Last.

In 2003, the band released their debut EP Aesthetic on Four Leaf Recordings which featured the vocals of Reardon, Good and Richter. The EP was an underground success, and during that year, the band toured heavily across the United States with bands such as Spitalfield and Alexisonfire. On September 5, 2003, From First To Last parted ways with Joey Antillion, who was subsequently replaced by Jon Weisberg for the band's remaining tour dates for that year. On November 13, 2003, the band announced that they had signed to Epitaph Records, and said they were planning on recording their debut album in January 2004.

=== Dear Diary, My Teen Angst Has a Bodycount (2004) ===
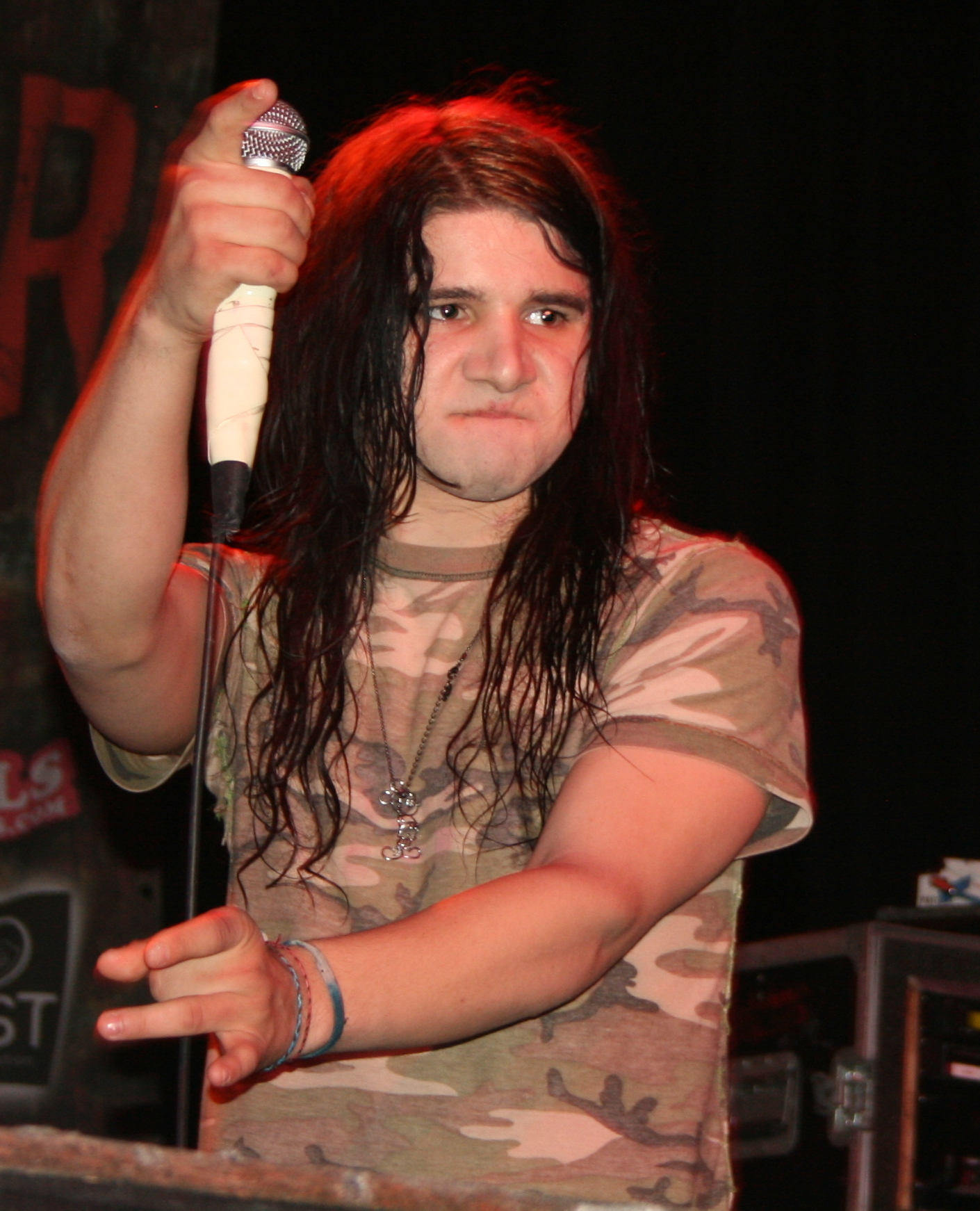
Sonny Moore (now the DJ and producer Skrillex) fronted the band from 2004 to 2007 and appeared on their first two studio albums, Dear Diary, My Teen Angst Has a Bodycount and Heroine. He later rejoined the band in 2017 (releasing two non-album singles) and remained with them before quietly disbanding again in 2019.

After the Aesthetic EP, the band wanted to move Matt Good to lead vocals. However, Good was reluctant to take on both lead vocal and lead guitar duties. He wanted From First to Last to have a frontman to connect with the crowd better. Using the social networking site MySpace, Good came in contact with a guitarist and singer from California, Sonny Moore. Moore flew to Valdosta, Georgia, where Dear Diary, My Teen Angst Has a Bodycount was being recorded. He was set to be the band's rhythm guitarist. However, when the other band members heard Moore singing "Featuring Some of Your Favorite Words", they decided that he was much better suited for lead singer than guitarist.

Matt Good wrote the album in two weeks. Moore came in after the music was tracked and completed the vocals. Dear Diary, My Teen Angst Has a Bodycount was released on June 28, 2004. The album went on to sell over 100,000 copies in the United States by 2006.

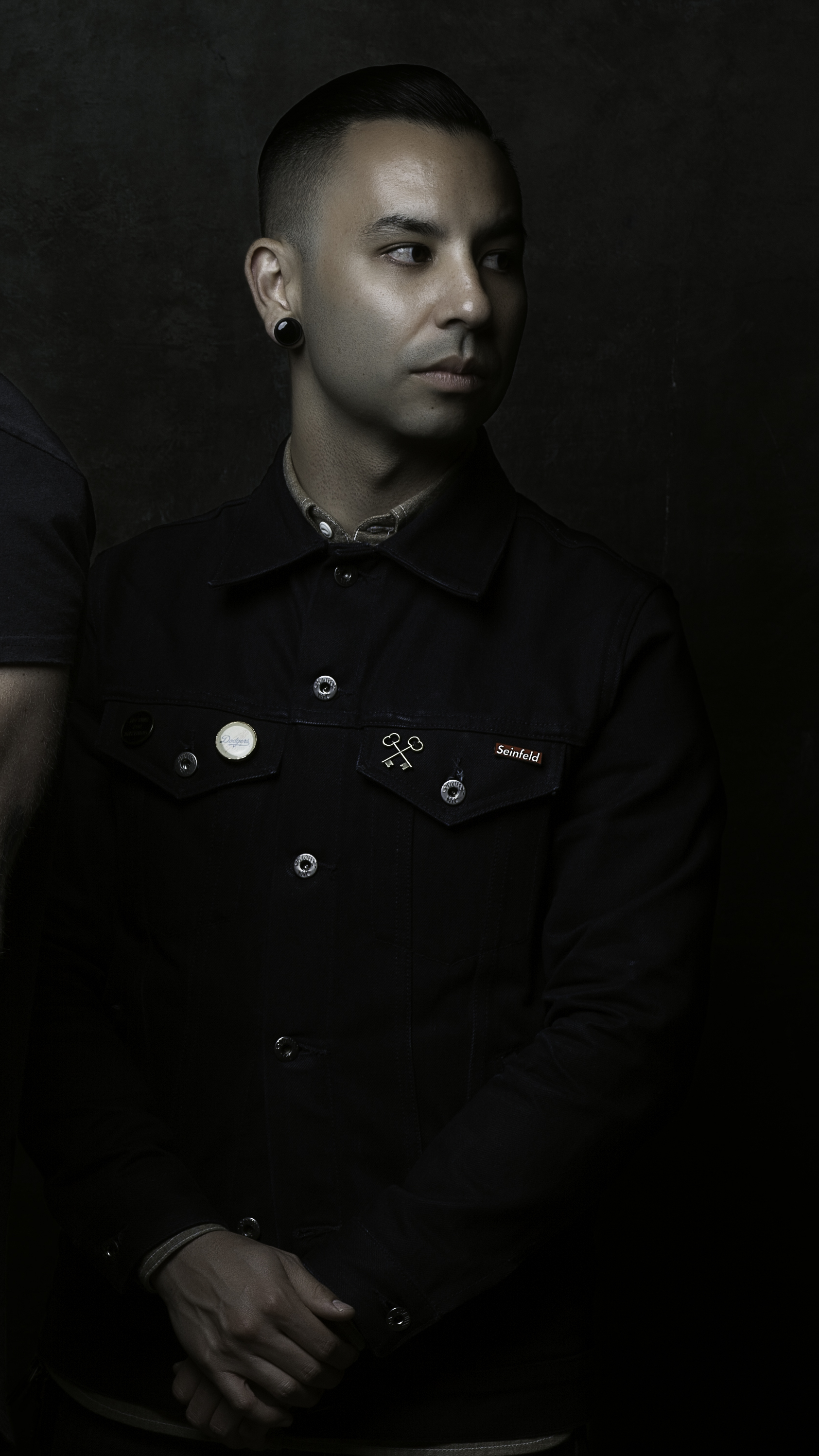
Jon Weisberg served as the band's bassist from 2003 to 2005 and played on their debut album.

From late May to mid-June 2005, From First to Last participated in the "Dead by Dawn" tour with bands Emanuel, Halifax and He Is Legend.

=== Heroine (2006) ===
The band went to Radio Star Studios in Weed, California to record their second album, produced by Ross Robinson. As their previous bassist Weisberg had been formally asked to leave the band due to internal conflicts, producer Ross Robinson asked Wes Borland, the original Limp Bizkit guitarist, to play bass on the album. Borland later played several tours with the band. The album was released on March 21, 2006. It opened on the Billboard albums chart at #25, with first-week sales of over 33,000. Shortly thereafter in April, they signed to major label Capitol Records after bidding between that label and Warner Bros.

From mid-March to mid-May the band toured alongside Fall Out Boy, Hawthorne Heights and The All-American Rejects for the "Black Clouds and Underdogs Tour" in support of the release of Heroine.

FFTL then did a short European Tour with various bands. The band then played several dates on the 2006 Vans Warped Tour, but were forced to drop out due to surgical removal of a nodule on Moore's vocal cords. He received his second nodule surgery in early July (his first being in May 2005). Following his recovery, From First to Last went out on the "World Championship Tour" supporting Atreyu along with Every Time I Die and Chiodos. While on that tour, Moore once again had vocal cord problems and had to leave the tour. The band had planned to have guitarists Good and Richter cover Moore's vocal duties for the duration of the tour until singer of Chiodos, Craig Owens, insisted that he provide lead vocals for their sets. Atreyu eventually forced From First to Last to drop the tour. The band later explained, "Our plan to enable us to play the rest of the tour was disregarded and as our crew was setting up for the show in Worcester, MA we were informed that we were being kicked off of the tour. Understand that it was not our choice to leave this tour... we were forced to leave." Atreyu then returned a statement about the controversy concerning From First to Last's departure, saying, "They couldn't perform as FFTL and are no longer on this tour."

=== Moore's departure, lineup instability and self-titled album (2007–2009) ===
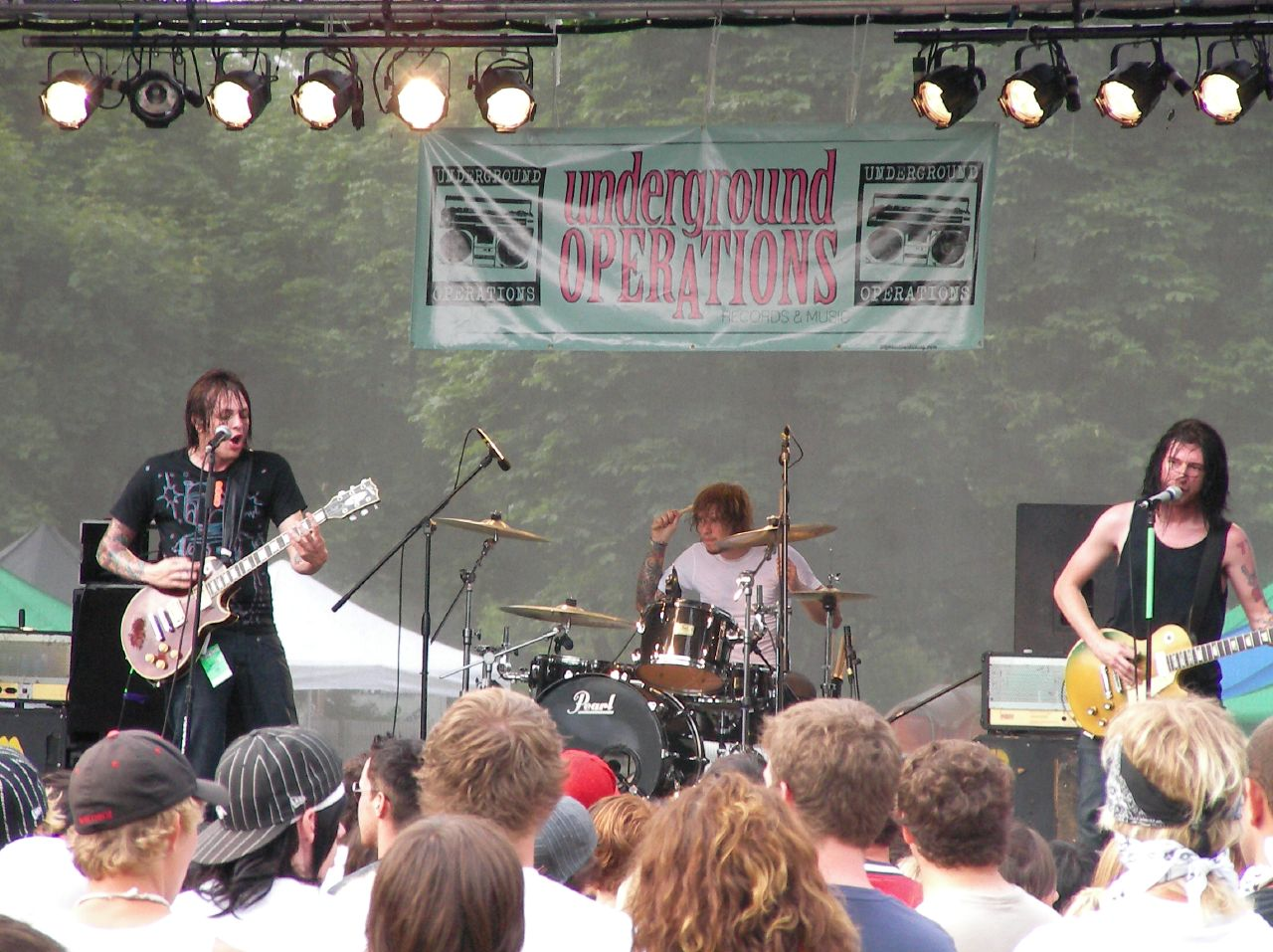
From First to Last performing in 2007

In February 2007, lead singer Sonny Moore left the band to pursue a solo career. His decision to leave was based on his urge to create his own music, and also due to the fact that singing in the band was putting immense strain on his vocal cords, resulting in serious damage which needed multiple surgeries. Moore posted new recordings on his Myspace and was part of a band called Sonny and the Blood Monkeys. Moore now writes, produces, and performs music under the alias/stage name Skrillex, winning multiple Grammy Awards for his electronic dance music and helping bring the dubstep genre to a mainstream audience.

After Moore's departure, From First to Last faced a crisis. Their label, Capitol Records, had dropped them due to financial problems. Without a vocalist, label, permanent bassist, or any money, the band almost split. Matt Good decided to take on lead vocals while still providing a backup guitar role. The band also quickly picked up Matt Manning to as bassist. The band then spent their remaining money on a studio in which to continue work on their already-written third album.

The remaining members of From First to Last finished a headlining tour from July 21 through August 5 with guests Alesana, Vanna, Brighten, and Four Year Strong. Shortly before recording another album, the band played for a portion of the "Show Must Go On" tour with Hawthorne Heights, Secondhand Serenade, Powerspace, and Brighten, but later cancelled their dates on the last part of the tour to open for Deftones on a separate Canadian tour.

After completing a full mix of their new material, From First to Last was picked up by Suretone Records. Shortly after, they re-entered the studio to record their album again, this time with a professional crew and better quality. The band recorded this time in Los Angeles, with producer Josh Abraham and seasoned engineer Ryan Williams.

At midnight on November 14, 2007, they released the first single from the album, "Two as One", on their Myspace account, and they later played that song live on Jimmy Kimmel Live!. A video was made for the song "Worlds Away" which was highly publicized. Billboard premiered the album's next single "We All Turn Back to Dust" on January 23, 2008.

Suretone Records organised a large scale marketing campaign for From First to Last in order to increase the band's mainstream exposure, which included partnerships with Myspace, Hot Topic and MTV. Most notably, Suretone negotiated a publishing deal with Electronic Arts which guaranteed that From First to Last's songs would appear in the next eleven video games released by the studio, including Madden NFL 09, FIFA 09 and Need for Speed: Undercover.

Despite the album's marketing campaign, the album received mixed reviews and undersold expectations, only reaching number 81 on the Billboard 200 chart.

From First to Last began their fall headlining tour, "RATHER BE SLAYIN' N00BZ", starting November 1 with guests Blessthefall, A Skylit Drive, and Vanna. Around the middle of the tour, the guests changed to Envy on the Coast, Pierce The Veil, Four Year Strong, and Mayday Parade.

On November 29, From First to Last announced they were going to be a part of the 2008 Hot Topic "Take Action Tour". They played at the MTV Winter Valencia in Spain on March 6. On December 6, they announced they were going to be part of the 2008 Vans Warped Tour.

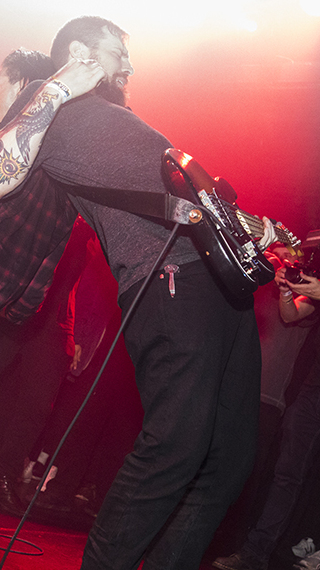
Matt Manning has served as the band's bassist since 2007, replacing Weisberg and making his debut with the band on their 2008 self-titled album.

On May 6, 2008, From First to Last released their self-titled album, and on June 20, hit the road on the Vans Warped Tour for its entirety.

On June 28, From First to Last updated their band members section of their MySpace, making Chris Lent a full-time member.

From the end of September to October 12, From First to Last played on The Blackout's "Sleep All Day, Party All Night" tour in the UK, along with The Medic Droid and We Are The Ocean.

=== Throne to the Wolves (2009–2010) ===
FFTL stated that they would be on a break from touring in late 2008. Members Travis Richter and Derek Bloom were focusing on their side project The Color of Violence. This included tours and a full-length debut album, Youthanize, which was released April 7, 2009. Chris Lent toured as the drummer for the band I Set My Friends on Fire as well as one of the two drummers for The Color of Violence (along with Jon Syverson of the band Daughters).

FFTL began writing new songs early in 2009 and started demoing the songs for their next album in March 2009, expected to be released March the following year. A full-length demo of a new song was put on their MySpace at that time, as well as the previously unheard b-side from Heroine, Save Us. A second full-length demo was added on July 3, 2009, and a message to fans that they would be announcing their recording schedule and tentative label. As of August 6, 2009, the band had begun to track drums for the new record at EarthSound studios in Valdosta Georgia, with Lee Dyess.

On October 1, 2009, FFTL announced that they would be touring with Greeley Estates and Therefore I Am in October and November, and also that they had signed to Rise Records.

"I want to announce officially that we've signed with Rise Records. We are all very excited about this move and think that together with Rise we can accomplish amazing things! If you're asking yourself why we made the change, well... There's a lot of aspects about being a major label that just didn't agree with the way we like to present our band and our music and I think that by ridding ourselves of that world, we are finally gonna set ourselves free to make the best music we can and that is the most important thing for us at the end of the day".

The band toured on the "You'd Be Way Cuter in a Coffin" tour with Alesana, The Word Alive, Asking Alexandria, and Memphis May Fire in December 2009. Though recording was supposedly finished, the band was called off the road and was forced to cancel the last two weeks worth of performances – much to the dismay of fans, some of whom began to complain that the band could never finish a tour, and start rumors of a breakup – in order to go back home to Valdosta and put finishing touches on their recording. Matt Good responded to these claims and rumors:

"Guys we're not breaking up no worries. we just came home from the tour early because we have to finish our record before our next tour with alesana and our time frame was looking pretty small and stressful so Rise suggested we come home a little early. It will result in our record being the best it can be, which is our No. 1 priority right now. I hope everyone can understand".

From First to Last released a new song off the album, "Going Lohan", on their MySpace page in November. The new album, Throne to the Wolves, was announced and slated for release on March 16, 2010.

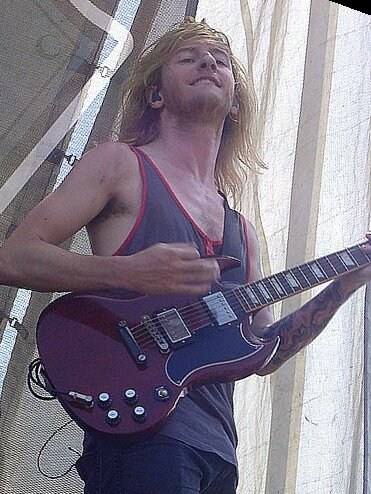
Rhythm guitarist Travis Richter left the band in 2009 and was replaced by Blake Steiner, who appeared on 2010's Throne to the Wolves. Richter later rejoined the band in subsequent iterations.

In late 2009 FFTL went through yet another lineup change with Travis Richter leaving the band; no official announcement had yet been made by the band and no reason was given for his departure. Matt Good and Matt Manning had been taking over Travis's screaming role and Blake Steiner (ex-Mia Medusa guitarist), who recorded on Throne to the Wolves, was his replacement. On December 31 FFTL released the song "I'll Inoculate The World with the Virus of My Disillusionment" on their MySpace.

On Travis' departure from the band:

"It kinda just grew and grew until the dudes parted ways with me..I'd never just up and leave FFTL, I feel like they thought it was their time to move away from me, so they told me to leave.."

On January 20, 2010, From First to Last made an official announcement about Travis's departure from the band via Myspace.

Since the news has become public I thought I'd take a minute to address it before wild rumors started flying around. Travis has been with us since the beginning and will always be someone I care about deeply. Unfortunately though, as time goes on sometimes people grow apart from each other. There's many things I could say, but they are rather personal and I don't think they need to be discussed here. This band is and always will be about making music with my friends. We don't give a fuck about fame or money or anything. It's about doing what we love together as a family. We aren't breaking up and we aren't changing our name. As long as we are making music we are proud of and having fun together, this band will continue to exist.

We wish the best to Travis in everything he does and he is still a friend to us. I want everyone to understand that this wasn't done out of hate or spite or any other negative emotion. The vibe needed to be creative together was just gone. It happens, it's sad and all, but that's just life. Anyone old enough to have personal relationships knows that people split ways all the time. That's how life is and it isn't going to change. We appreciate everyone who has stuck by this bands side through all these years. If this upsets you so greatly that you feel you can't listen to us anymore, that's ok and we understand. We still love you anyway ; )

Just know that when bands make these decisions they are always a last resort. NO ONE wants to have to kick out a member of their band. It is never easy and always incites drama, but sometimes you have to make really hard decisions. It's part of being an adult.

Beginning on March 13, 2010, From First to Last headlined the "Royal Family Tour 2010", supported by Eyes Set To Kill, Confide, Black Veil Brides and Sleeping with Sirens. That tour concluded on April 10.

Throne to the Wolves was released March 16, 2010. The album was received well by critics and fans alike; getting favorable reviews from Alternative Press, and Absolute Punk. The album debuted at #24 on the Billboard Top Hard Rock Albums, and #45 on The Top Independent Albums. This was the band's first album not to chart the Billboard 200 since Dear Diary. After spending one week on the charts it dropped off; despite its poor debut, and first week sales of less than 4000, the album was seen as a fresh start, and a new beginning for the band.

Starting on May 8, 2010, the band toured with Our Last Night, We Came as Romans, and A Bullet For Pretty Boy on the "Welcome to the Circus" tour, headlined by Asking Alexandria. The tour ended on June 9.

On June 10, 2010, the band began playing dates through June 18 supporting A Skylit Drive on the second half of the "Go Fist Pump Yourself Tour", along with Tides of Man and Abandon All Ships.

=== Hiatus (2010–2013) ===
On July 28, 2010, Matt Good announced that From First to Last was going on hiatus:

"Hey guys, just wanted to take a minute to update you all with the current status of FFTL. As of now right now we are basically going on hiatus. Now before everyone starts jumping to conclusions I just want to make sure everyone knows me and the other members of the band are all still very, very close. We have been best friends for years and will continue to be for as long as I can possibly forsee, so I don't want anyone to think this is a result of animosity between them and I. There is nothing but love between us. This is mostly a decisions based on a changing of times and the desire to start pursuing new things in our lives. This band has been the center of our lives for our entire adulthood to date. Four full length albums and almost 8 years of solid touring later, the urge to see what else we are capable of achieving is almost overwhelming and I feel like there is no better time than now to go ahead and take a leap of faith and see what happens. Just know From First To Last is responsible for everything I have in my life, good and bad, and as far as I'm concerned it will probably continue to exist until I am too old to do it anymore or dead. We love every single person that has ever helped make our dream of being musicians and traveling the world come true. I know without the people who supported us, we would be nothing and I am eternally grateful for everything. Just know we aren't going to let you guys down and we still plan on making music at some point in the future when it makes sense for all of us. For now just keep a lookout for new projects and future endeavors from all of us. Thanks for an incredible 8 years!"

On July 29, 2010, Craig Owens posted a video on Facebook saying that Matt Good was the guitarist and keyboardist of his new band. On August 18, 2010, Owens announced that the band's name would be Destroy Rebuild Until God Shows. The band's members included vocalist Craig Owens (Chiodos), drummer Aaron Stern (Matchbook Romance), guitarist/vocalist Nick Martin (Underminded), bassist Adam Russell (Story of the Year) and Matt Good on guitar, keyboards and vocals. D.R.U.G.S. disbanded in April 2012, as a result of the departure of lead singer Craig Owens to rejoin his former band Chiodos.

In 2011, Matt Manning and Blake Steiner formed the band Eye in the Sky. The band's members include Matt Simpson (drums), Blake Steiner (guitar) and Matt Manning (vocals and bass).

On August 20, 2013, Jon Weisberg launched his new band XO Stereo and released the first single Show And Tell with an accompanying music video. The band also features Justin Whitesel from LoveHateHero.

=== Reunion, introduction of Sotelo and Dead Trees (2013–2015) ===
Periphery's Spencer Sotelo fronted the band from 2014 to 2016.

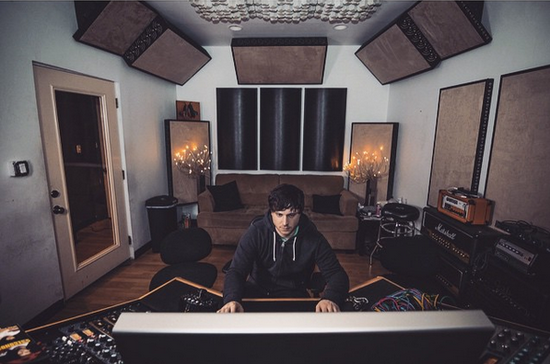
Producer Taylor Larson served as a rhythm guitarist also from 2014 to 2016 and contributed to the band's comeback album Dead Trees.

In November 2013, Matt Good, Derek Bloom, Matt Manning and Travis Richter reunited as From First to Last and launched a Kickstarter campaign to fund the recording of a new EP. Good said he also reached out to Sonny Moore to see if he would be interested in contributing in some way. Months after exceeding its crowd-funding goal of $25,000 by raising over $30,000, the band changed its plans slightly: the recording sessions proved fruitful and the band decided to release a full-length album instead of an EP, and the lineup changed significantly. Bloom was no longer a part of the reunion and the remaining members expanded to a six-piece with the addition of vocalist Spencer Sotelo of Periphery, drummer Ernie Slenkovich and third guitarist Taylor Larson. With the new lineup, From First to Last recorded and released an online stream of a new version of "Note to Self" – originally released on Dear Diary, My Teen Angst Has a Bodycount in 2004 with Moore on vocals – to commemorate its 10-year anniversary.

From First to Last released the first single, eponymously titled "Dead Trees," off their fifth studio album on November 24, 2014. Weeks later in January 2015, From First to Last announced their signing to Sumerian Records for the release of the album. On April 23, 2015, the band released Dead Trees through Sumerian.

=== Departure of Sotelo, Moore's return, and sporadic releases (2016–2025) ===
On July 30, 2016, former vocalist Sonny Moore, performing as Skrillex, hosted a radio show on Beats 1. The show concluded with an untitled bonus track that, as noted by Alternative Press, evoked the earlier work of From First to Last, featuring Moore's vocals. Speculation about a potential reunion circulated following a Facebook post.

On August 1, 2016, Spencer Sotelo announced his departure from the band.

The band released a new single, "Make War," on January 15, 2017, featuring vocalist Sonny Moore and original drummer Derek Bloom's return (although the single showcased drummer Travis Barker instead of Bloom.) Their initial performance with Moore and Bloom occurred on February 7, at an Emo Nite LA event in Los Angeles, California, at the Echoplex venue. This marked the band's first live appearance with Moore in a decade and Bloom since his departure in 2010. Longtime bassist Matt Manning also rejoined for the performance, having only briefly played alongside Moore before his initial departure from the band.

In 2017, Moore stated that "Make War" was their first composition after reuniting and expressed intentions to release more music.

In December 2017, the band premiered a new song titled "Surrender" at Emo Nite Day in Los Angeles. The track was subsequently officially released on July 23, 2018, with Bloom returning on drums. The band has maintained a low profile, primarily using social media for sporadic updates since the release.

On September 24, 2023, Matt Good confirmed his return as the lead vocalist for the band.

On July 19, 2024, the band released a new single called "Genesis", with strong anime and Japanese culture influences. On August 9, 2024, the band uploaded an accompanying music video for "Genesis", featuring various scenes from Rebuild of Evangelion.

On September 19th, 2025, the band released a single titled "Mirror Soul", in collaboration with Kellin Quinn. The song was mixed by Matt Good and mastered by Taylor Larson.

After the release of “Mirror Soul,” From First to Last were in talks with Kellin Quinn to become their new lead vocalist, however Quinn ultimately couldn’t commit due to scheduling conflicts with Sleeping With Sirens. During this period, Lil Lotus was initially brought in to help write material for the band, but after Quinn stepped away, Lotus took over the role and became the band's new lead vocalist.

=== Arrival of Villagran and Signing to Fearless (2026–present) ===
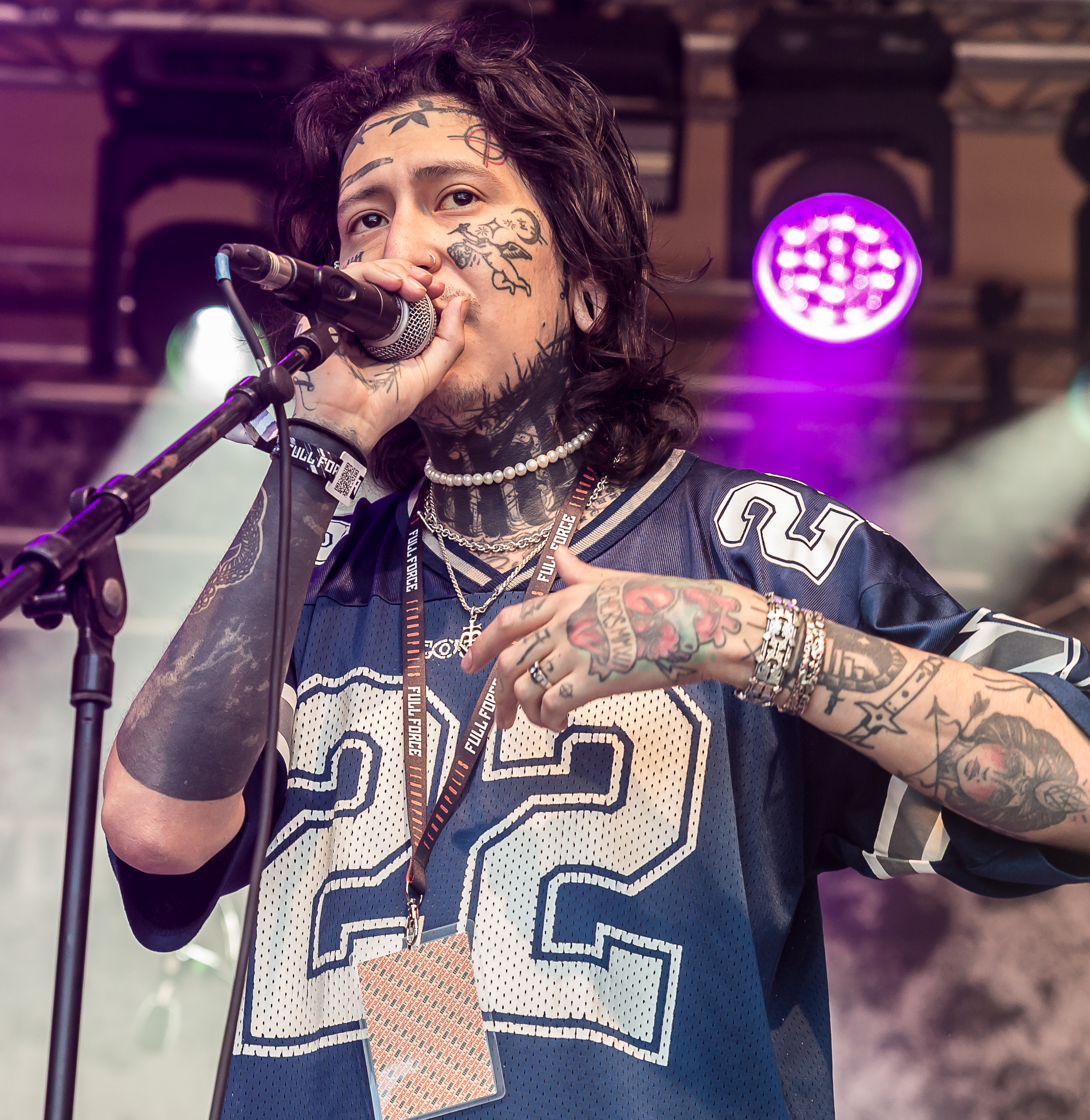
Rapper Lil Lotus has fronted the band since 2026.

The band made an appearance at Welcome to Rockville in Daytona Beach, Florida in May 2026. At the show, the band confirmed that Lil Lotus had joined the band as vocalist.

On July 24, 2026, the band released a new single, "Your Name In Red Ink," their first release with Fearless Records. Later on September 11, 2026, the band released the second single with Villagran on vocals, "They Said Your Ghost was a Promise" as well as announcing a new EP, We Were Bleeding Anyway which was released on October 2, 2026.

== Musical style and influences ==
From First to Last has been described as post-hardcore, emo, screamo, indie rock, and pop screamo. Kerrang! referred to them as a "Myspace band" due to their popularity on the social media platform early in their career. The staff of OC Weekly stated the opinion that the band's music would appeal most to "you're [sic] sister who's a sucker for acoustic music."

They have cited influences including AFI, the Used, Finch, Story of the Year, Brand New, Taking Back Sunday, Texas is the Reason, Mineral, Gameface, Jawbox, Descendents, Foo Fighters, Metallica and Naked Ape.

== Band members ==
Current members

- Matt Good – lead guitar, vocals (1999–2010, 2013–present); keyboards, programming (2004–2010, 2013–present); rhythm guitar (1999–2002); lead vocals (1999–2002, 2007–2010, 2023–2025)
- Travis Richter – rhythm guitar, unclean vocals (2002–2009, 2013–present)
- Matt Manning – bass, backing vocals (2007–2010, 2013–2017, 2025–present)
- Chris Lent – drums, percussion (2026–present; touring 2025); keyboards, synthesizers (2008–2009)
- Elias "Lil Lotus" Villagran – lead vocals (2026–present)

== Discography ==
Studio albums

- Dear Diary, My Teen Angst Has a Bodycount (2004)
- Heroine (2006)
- From First to Last (2008)
- Throne to the Wolves (2010)
- Dead Trees (2015)

== Awards ==
| Year | Nominated work | Award | Result | Ref |
|---|---|---|---|---|
| 2006 | From First to Last | Alternative Press: Best International Newcomer | Nominated | |
