= Naked Ape =

Naked Ape may refer to:

== Biology ==
- The Naked Ape, a 1967 book on human evolutionary history by Desmond Morris
  - Human (idiomatic)
  - Pre-humans, in human evolution that were hairless

== Other uses ==
- Naked Ape (band), a Swedish indie/electronica band
- The Naked Ape (film), a 1973 American comedy film
- Sirens (2011 TV series), a British comedy-drama series, working title Naked Apes
