= Throne to the Wolves =

Studio album by From First to Last
- Released: March 16, 2010
- Recorded: 2009
- Studio: Earthsound Recording
- Genres: Post-hardcore; metalcore; pop screamo
- Length: 37:10
- Label: Rise
- Producers: Lee Dyess, Matt Good

From First to Last chronology
From First to Last (2008)	Throne to the Wolves (2010)	Dead Trees (2015)

Singles from Throne to the Wolves
- 1. "Going Lohan" Released: November 17, 2009; 2. "Cashing Out" Released: December 24, 2009; 3. "I'll Inoculate the World with the Virus of My Disillusionment" Released: December 31, 2009

Professional ratings
Review scores
Source	Rating
Alternative Press	4/5 stars
AbsolutePunk.net	(76%)

Throne to the Wolves is the fourth studio album by the post-hardcore band From First to Last. This was the only album by From First to Last to be released on the record label Rise Records and is the first and only album the band made without guitarist and backup singer Travis Richter (who left the band in 2009, returning in 2013 as part of their reunion). It is also the band's only release with guitarist Blake Steiner and the band's last release before their hiatus in 2010, until the band's reunion in 2013 whereupon they announced the recording of a new album. No song of the album has become a single, but "Going Lohan", "Cashing Out" and "I'll Inoculate the World with the Virus of My Disillusionment" were released in 2009, before album release, via MySpace for free listening.

== Track listing ==
All tracks are written by Matt Good, Derek Bloom and Matt Manning.

No.	Title	Length
1.	"Cashing Out"	3:06
2.	"Chyeaaaaa!"	1:01
3.	"Elvis Said Ambition Is a Dream with a V8 Engine"	4:21
4.	"G.R.I.T.S."	3:03
5.	"Going Lohan"	2:39
6.	"I'll Inoculate the World with the Virus of My Disillusionment"	4:31
7.	"You, Me, and the Significant Others"	3:52
8.	"The He Man Woman Haters Club"	3:14
9.	"M.O."	4:04
10.	"A Soft War"	2:16
11.	"Now That You're Gone"	5:03
Total length:		37:10

== Personnel ==
- Throne to the Wolves album personnel as listed on Allmusic.

From First to Last

- Matt Good – lead vocals, lead guitar, keyboards, synthesizers, programming, production
- Blake Steiner – rhythm guitar, unclean vocals production
- Matt Manning – bass, unclean vocals, production
- Derek Bloom – drums, percussion, programming, additional guitars, backing vocals, production

Production

- Lee Dyess – production, engineer, mixing
- Kamal Moo – management
- Thomson Moore – artwork
- Dan Shike – mastering

== Charts ==
Chart performance
Chart (2010)	Peak position
US Independent Albums (Billboard)	45
US Top Hard Rock Albums (Billboard)	24
