= Derek Bloom =

American drummer (born 1983)

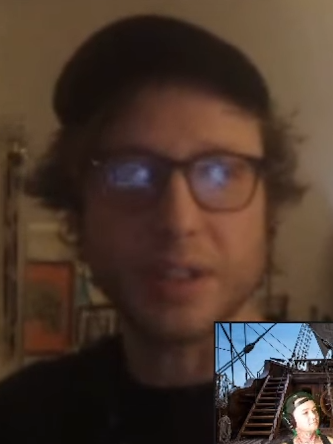
- Bloom in 2022

Background information
- Born: January 30, 1983 (age 43); South Pasadena, California, U.S.
- Genres: Post-hardcore; grindcore; experimental rock; emo; alternative rock; mathcore; screamo
- Occupation: Drummer
- Years active: 2001–present
- Member of: The Color of Violence
- Formerly of: From First to Last

Derek Bloom (born January 30, 1983) is an American drummer best known as a member of the post-hardcore band From First to Last. He is also the drummer for his grindcore side-project with Travis Richter, known as The Color of Violence.

== Career ==
=== From First to Last (2002–2010, 2017–2025) ===
Bloom was the second drummer, although technically the first official drummer of post-hardcore band From First to Last. He was featured in every release by the band, up until their indefinite hiatus, which was announced on July 28, 2010. Lead vocalist Matt Good release this statement about the hiatus:

"Hey guys, just wanted to take a minute to update you all with the current status of FFTL. As of now right now we are basically going on hiatus. Now before everyone starts jumping to conclusions I just want to make sure everyone knows me and the other members of the band are all still very, very close. We have been best friends for years and will continue to be for as long as I can possibly foresee, so I don't want anyone to think this is a result of animosity between them and I. There is nothing but love between us. This is mostly a decisions based off a changing of times and the desire to start pursuing new things in our lives. This band has been the center of our lives for our entire adulthood to date. Four full length albums and almost 8 years of solid touring later, the urge to see what else we are capable of achieving is almost overwhelming and I feel like there is no better time than now to go ahead and take a leap of faith and see what happens. Just know From First To Last is responsible for everything I have in my life, good and bad, and as far as I'm concerned it will probably continue to exist until I am too old to do it anymore or dead. We love every single person that has ever helped make our dream of being musicians and traveling the world come true. I know without the people who supported us, we would be nothing and I am eternally grateful for everything. Just know we aren't going to let you guys down and we still plan on making music at some point in the future when it makes sense for all of us. For now just keep a lookout for new projects and future endeavors from all of us. Thanks for an incredible 8 years!"

=== The Color of Violence (2002–2003, 2006–present) ===
Bloom formed grindcore band The Color of Violence with future members of From First to Last, including current guitarist and vocalist Matt Good, as well as former bassist Joe Antillion and former guitarist Travis Richter, as well as Richter's friend Chad Crews on guitar. The band started out full-time from 2002 to 2003, but all of the members, except for Crews, decided to focus on From First to Last. But in 2006, Richter and Bloom decided to remake the project as a two-man duo, with Richter. The two released their debut full-length album, Youthanize, on April 7, 2009. The band said that "[Youthanize] may not be groundbreaking, and it may not sell any copies, but we tried to be ourselves and experiment, and we're all really happy with the way it turned out, so fuck it." The album did not chart on any of Billboard's music charts.

== Discography ==
From First to Last

- Aesthetic (Four Leaf Recordings, 2003)
- Dear Diary, My Teen Angst Has a Body Count (Epitaph Records, 2004)
- Heroine (Epitaph Records, 2006)
- From First to Last (Suretone/Interscope Records, 2008)
- Throne to the Wolves (Rise Records, 2010)

The Color of Violence

- Youthanize (Epitaph Records, 2009)
