= Heroine (From First to Last album) =

Studio album by From First to Last
- Released: March 21, 2006
- Recorded: 2005
- Studios: Radio Star (Weed, California); Ross Robinson's bedroom (Venice, Los Angeles)
- Genres: Post-hardcore; screamo; nu metal; hardcore punk; emo
- Length: 43:41
- Label: Epitaph
- Producer: Ross Robinson

From First to Last chronology
Dear Diary, My Teen Angst Has a Bodycount (2004)	Heroine (2006)	From First to Last (2008)

Singles from Heroine
- 1. "The Latest Plague" Released: June 20, 2006

Heroine is the second studio album by the American post-hardcore band From First to Last, released on March 21, 2006, through Epitaph Records. The album was recorded in late 2005 by producer Ross Robinson in Weed and Venice, California. Wes Borland played bass on the album in place of Jon Weisberg, who left the band shortly before recording. A darker and more serious album compared to From First to Last's debut album Dear Diary, My Teen Angst Has a Bodycount (2004), Heroine is a post-hardcore, screamo and nu metal album utilizing complex arragments and incorporating elements from various genres. It was From First to Last's final album with vocalist Sonny Moore before his departure in November 2006, though he would later reunite with the band between 2017 and 2019.

Heroine received positive reviews from critics, who highlighted From First to Last's growth and Robinson's production, though some found it inconsistent and unoriginal. It sold 33,000 copies within its first week to debut at number 25 on the US Billboard 200, giving the band their first and only top forty album. Throughout 2006, From First to Last toured North America and Europe with Story of the Year, Every Time I Die, Fall Out Boy, the All-American Rejects and Hawthorne Heights. The band's tours later in the year, on the Warped Tour and with Atreyu, were marred by issues with Moore's vocals that resulted in them leaving both prematurely.

== Background and recording ==
In 2004, From First to Last released their debut studio album, Dear Diary, My Teen Angst Has a Bodycount, which sold more than 100,000 copies and established the band in the post-hardcore scene. Thereafter, the band spent an extended period of time writing Heroine. Drummer Derek Bloom described the album's writing process as less chaotic and pressured compared to that of Dear Diary. Guitarist Travis Richter said the band decided early on to write whatever they liked, and wanted to emphasize musicianship over other people's expectations. From First to Last sent their demoes to producer Ross Robinson, who had worked on albums by bands they were inspired by including At the Drive-In, Korn, and Slipknot; guitarist Matt Good said they believed he would help them "[create] their own avenue on the musical highway." Though they did not think he would be interested, Robinson responded enthustiastically to the band's demoes.

Following a period of pre-production at a studio in Albany, Georgia, From First to Last began recording Heroine with Robinson in California in late September 2005. Recording sessions were held at Radio Star Studios in Weed, whose secluded nature Robinson hoped would prevent From First to Last from becoming distracted, and Robinson's bedroom in Venice, Los Angeles. They utilized Pro Tools "as a tape medium" for recording, and did not do anything they could not replicate on tape, such as applying drum triggers. Robinson set up recording to be like a live show and cheered the band on through speakers. Bloom was made to practice with the other members of From First to Last before going to record his tracks in a cramped space in the studio's "dungeon". The guitars were recorded directly to console instead of through amps, whilst vocalist Sonny Moore recorded full takes.

Wes Borland played bass on Heroine in place of Jon Weisberg, who departed the band shortly before recording commenced. Good said that he and Richter did not want to play bass as they "wanted another vibe", so Robinson asked Borland, who drove to Weed from Los Angeles and completed his parts in three or four days; he also wrote a song with the band that did not make the final album. Borland joined From First to Last as their bassist during their tours in support of Heroine, but not as an official member of the band due to his commitments in other bands including Black Light Burns. Good handled all programming on the album with the exception of "The Levy", which was done by Atticus Ross. The album was mixed by Andy Wallace, and it was completed by late December 2005.

== Composition ==
The [Heroine] is whoever, actually. It's kind of a paradox. We chose that name because we knew people would instantly think of [heroin], and that's a direct pointing of the finger, like saying, "Look at you, you're so negative. You immediately think of the drug, when obviously, the spelling indicates that it's a female hero." And a heroine can be a mother or a savior. It means life, essentially.

— Travis Richter

Heroine has been described as post-hardcore, screamo, nu metal, hardcore punk and emo. A darker and more serious album compared to Dear Diary, My Teen Angst Has a Body Count, Heroine features more complex songwriting with melodic elements and hooks, irregular, shifting tempos, effects-laden guitars and hard-hitting drums. The album also incorporates elements of progressive music, black metal, industrial music, and electronica, with the latter drawing influence from artists including Aphex Twin, Nine Inch Nails, and Squarepusher. Moore's vocals emphasize singing over screaming; Alternative Press's Aaron Burgess called his "upper-register vocal acrobatics" defining of From First to Last's sound.

Heroine's opening track, "Mothersound", begins atmospherically with wailed vocals before breaking into doom guitars. Daniel Lukes of Decibel called the song an "adrenaline-rush cavalcade". "The Latest Plague" is a pummelling track about From First to Last embracing that they are different; Richter viewed it as a "call to arms" for the band's "true fans". Scott Weber of AbsolutePunk considered "...And We All Have a Hell" reminiscent of "previous Ross Robinson type bands". Moore wrote "Afterbirth" after discovering he was adopted and had also known who his biological parents were his entire life; he intended its lyrics to be "the most intense thing I could think of". "World War Me" combines "clinky" drums and guitars and features a chorus of "woahs". Good said the song is about "self-destruction, getting wasted, kissing your cares away and fucking girls." "Shame Shame" is about feeling intense shame after doing things one knows are wrong, and is marked by "mentalist" guitar riffing, and double kick drums. "The Crows Are Coming for Us" begins with rolling drums that lead into chanted choruses pairing wails with "interlaying, heavily spacey noise" that Brian Schultz of Punknews.org compared with Creative Eclipses-era Cave In. Schultz considered the piano-driven composition of "The Levy" reminiscient of Nine Inch Nails' third album The Fragile (1999). Drowned in Sound's Raziq Rauf states that Moore "stretches [his] vocal talents to the max" on the track. "Goodbye Waves" is an electronic ballad that cuts into distorted sounds. Moore details his struggles with bulimia in "Waltz Moore", and calls out for his mother on Heroine's closing title track, which Burgess described as a "time-crunching workout".

== Release and promotion ==
From First to Last announced Heroine and unveiled its artwork and track listing on December 20, 2005. The band toured with Story of the Year and Every Time I Die in January 2006, before embarking on a headlining European tour in February. A music video for Heroine's lead single, "The Latest Plague", was filmed in Sweden that month and released online on March 14, 2006. Four days after being streamed on From First to Last's Myspace page, Heroine was released on March 21, 2006, through Epitaph Records; the band signed to Capitol Records shortly thereafter, following a four-month bidding war between the label and Warner Bros. Records. The album sold 33,000 copies within its first week to debut at number 25 on the US Billboard 200, giving From First to Last their first and only top forty album. The album also charted at number 71 on the Australian Albums chart, and number 192 on the UK Albums Chart. On June 20, 2006, "The Latest Plague" was serviced to radio stations. A music video for "Shame Shame" was released in October 2006. In February 2009, an unreleased Heroine B-side, "Save Us", was posted to the band's Myspace page.

From March 15 to May 12, 2006, the band toured with Fall Out Boy, the All-American Rejects and Hawthorne Heights as part of the former's Black Clouds and Underdogs Tour. Following a European festival tour, the band returned to the United States to perform on as a headlining act on the Warped Tour 2006, but dropped off the tour on July 4, 2006, owing to Moore requiring vocal chord nodule surgery. In October 2006, From First to Last toured as a supporting act for Atreyu, alongside Every Time I Die and Chiodios. On October 24—approximately halfway through the tour—Moore tore a vocal cord and was advised by a doctor to rest his voice or risk permanently damaging it. From First to Last planned to continue the tour with Craig Owens of Chiodios filling in on vocals and Moore playing guitar, but later announced they had been "kicked off" the tour by Atreyu, resulting in a feud between the two bands. Atreyu's then-vocalist, Alex Varkatzas, accused the band of wanting to be paid the same amount of money for using a fill-in singer, though expressed sympathy with Moore's condition. From First to Last cancelled a planned tour of the United Kingdom supporting Lostprophets and ended touring in support of Heroine early to begin work on new material in Orlando, where Moore told the band he was leaving in November 2006; they left Capitol shortly thereafter and signed to Suretone Records in early 2007. Moore briefly reunited with From First to Last between 2017 and 2019.

== Critical reception ==
Professional ratings
Review scores
Source	Rating
AbsolutePunk	72%
AllMusic	3.5/5 stars
Alternative Press	4/5
Big Cheese	5/5 stars
Drowned in Sound	7/10
Kerrang!	4/5 stars
Ox-Fanzine	4/10
Punknews.org	3/5 stars
Rock Hard	8/10

Heroine received positive reviews from music critics. Yates of Kerrang! called the album a "very real breath of fresh air" and felt it made From First To Last "one of the most daring and, courtesy of Robinson's stellar production job, aurally harrowing bands in the emo/hardcore world." Corey Apar of AllMusic praised the band's growth from Dear Diary and chose "The Latest Plague", "World War Me", and "Waltz Moore" as track picks from Heroine. Rauf of Drowned in Sound described it as an "almost total turnaround" from the album and highlighted its overall execution, despite feeling it lacked inventiveness. Punknews.org's Schultz and Weber of AbsolutePunk both highlighted the album's growth but criticized its later tracks and pacing, with the latter stating it "effectively dies" and became repetitive after "The Crows Are Coming for Us". Lachlan Marks of Drum Media remarked that From First to Last's technical abilities did not stop the album from being "momentarily mind blowing then completely forgettable." Ox-Fanzine's Thomaz Renz called the album dated and likened Robinson's production to a "can of stale electronic fiddlesticks", whilst Exclaim!'s Cam Lindsay dismissed it as "cookie-cutter melodic hardcore/screamo/whatever" and compared From First to Last unfavourably with My Chemical Romance. Schultz, Weber, Burgess of Alternative Press and Lukes of Decibel discussed From First to Last's divisive image and reputation amongst contemporary listeners in their reviews of Heroine and felt the album largely transcended it; the latter two anticipated it would receive polarizing responses within From First to Last's fanbase but nevertheless grow on listeners over time. Good observed in a July 2006 interview with The Nerve that there was a "strong faction" of fans that received it well, and another large group that didn't receive it as well due to it being "as drastic a difference from Dear Diary as it was."

Kerrang! ranked Heroine as the 20th best album of 2006, and included "The Latest Plague" in its list of the "250 Rock Anthems You Must Own". In 2019, Rock Sound ranked Heroine at number 174 on its list of the 250 greatest albums released since the publication's debut in 1999. In a 2020 retrospective article for Alternative Press, Marian Phillips credited the album with establishing From First to Last in the mainstream and stated that it "remains a staple to scene culture". Nick Martin of Sleeping with Sirens cited the album as an influence on the initial songwriting of Destroy Rebuild Until God Shows, before Good joined the band. During the recording of Sleeping with Sirens' sixth album How It Feels to Be Lost (2019), vocalist Kellin Quinn asked Good, who produced the album, to make the band do something unexpected in reference to Heroine. With over 232,000 copies sold in the United States by April 2008, it remains From First to Last's best selling album.

== Track listing ==
All tracks are written by From First To Last.

No.	Title	Length
1.	"Mothersound"	4:00
2.	"The Latest Plague"	3:18
3.	"... And We All Have a Hell"	3:22
4.	"Afterbirth"	3:15
5.	"World War Me"	3:10
6.	"Shame Shame"	3:35
7.	"The Crows Are Coming for Us"	4:55
8.	"The Levy"	3:49
9.	"Goodbye Waves"	4:22
10.	"Waltz Moore"	4:08
11.	"Heroine"	5:40
Total length:		43:41

== Personnel ==
Adapted from liner notes.

From First to Last
- Sonny Moore – lead vocals
- Matt Good – lead guitar, vocals; programming (all tracks except 8)
- Travis Richter – rhythm guitar, screamed vocals
- Derek Bloom – drums

Additional musicians

- Wes Borland – bass
- Brett Gurewitz – vocals (track 1)
- Jaqueline Marie – vocals (track 1)
- Atticus Ross – programming (track 8)
Production
- Ross Robinson – producer
- Ryan Boesch – engineer
- Kale Holmes – assistant engineer
- Bernie Grundman – mastering
- Andy Wallace – mixing

Artwork

- Nick Pritchard – art direction, design
- Lauren Steil – photography

== Charts ==
Chart performance
Chart (2006)	Peak position
Australian Albums (ARIA)	71
Canadian Albums (Nielsen SoundScan)	38
UK Albums (Official Charts)	192
UK Independent Albums (Official Charts)	20
UK Rock & Metal Albums (Official Charts)	5
US Billboard 200	25
US Independent Albums (Billboard)	2
US Top Rock Albums (Billboard)	7
