= Matt Good =

American musician (born 1984)

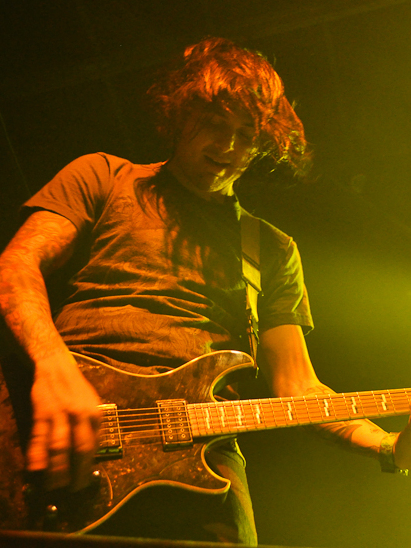
- Good performing with Destroy Rebuild Until God Shows in 2011

Background information
- Born: Matthew Aaron Good; February 11, 1984 (age 42); Valrico, Florida, United States
- Origin: Tampa, Florida, United States
- Genres: Post-hardcore; metalcore; experimental rock; emo; alternative rock; screamo; dubstep; electronica
- Occupations: Musician; singer; record producer
- Instruments: Vocals; guitar; keyboards
- Years active: 1999–present
- Labels: Decaydance; Rise; Suretone; Interscope; Capitol; Epitaph; Sumerian; Four Leaf Recordings
- Member of: From First to Last
- Formerly of: Kit Fysto; Destroy Rebuild Until God Shows; The Color of Violence
- Children: 1

Matthew Aaron Good (born February 11, 1984) is an American musician, singer and record producer. He is best known for being the lead guitarist, lead vocalist and the only constant member of the post-hardcore band From First to Last from its conception in 1999 until now. He was formerly the guitarist of grindcore band The Color of Violence, which featured future From First to Last members Travis Richter, Derek Bloom, and Joey Antillon. He joined Chiodos vocalist Craig Owens' band, D.R.U.G.S., eventually moving on to produce music under the name Kit Fysto with friend AJ Calderon. He currently owns and operates a music recording studio in Tempe, Arizona called Good Sounds and plays guitar in From First to Last. He also produced Asking Alexandria's self titled album, which was released on 15 December 2017.

== Musical career ==
=== The Color of Violence and From First to Last (2002–2010, 2013–Present) ===
Good was originally in grindcore outfit The Color of Violence, then known as Skeleton Slaughter vs. Fetus Destroyer. The band had started as a full-time project, but Good, along with fellow members Travis Richter, Derek Bloom, and Joey Antillon, decided to move on to form From First to Last.

From First to Last (then known as simply First Too Last) was founded by guitarist-vocalist Travis Richter and Good. The group, then having a rotating line-up, released their debut EP, Aesthetic, on Four Leaf Recordings in New York. Good and Bloom were the only original members to be on all of the band's releases. They were featured on all four of the band's full-length albums and went on all of their tours.

=== Destroy Rebuild Until God Shows (D.R.U.G.S.) (2010–2012) ===
After being kicked out of Chiodos in late 2009, Craig Owens had started saying that he was putting a new band together, which was unnamed at the time. Owens later revealed the name of the new band was D.R.U.G.S., which is an acronym for Destroy Rebuild Until God Shows. Owens started to reveal band members one by one through video blogs. By the time the last member was announced, the band consisted of Craig Owens as the lead vocalist, Matt Good as a guitarist and vocalist, Nick Martin also as a guitarist and vocalist, Adam Russell as bassist and Aaron Stern as the drummer. The band entered the recording studio on August 25, 2010, and finished recording the album on October 21 of the same year. The band then went on their first headlining tour Rise from the Ashes Tour, supported by Eyes Set To Kill and New Medicine, taking place between December 4–19, 2010. The band announced that the album would be titled D.R.U.G.S. with a release date of February 22, 2011.

=== Kit Fysto and Rumors Surrounding New D.R.U.G.S. Project (2012–2013) ===
While in D.R.U.G.S., Matt Good and friend AJ Calderon created a side project named "juiceb0x". The two produced a few Dubstep/Electronica remixes under that name. Later, however, they changed their name from "juiceb0x" to Kit Fysto, due to a copyright infringement issue. After Matt Good and two other band members left D.R.U.G.S., Kit Fysto became Matt Good and AJ Calderon's full-time project. The two are scheduled to play their first live show together June 22, 2012 at The Electric Glow Festival in Allentown, Pennsylvania. The two have an official YouTube channel, KitFystoOfficial, which only has one video due to the fact that Matt Good and AJ Calderon have a newfound addiction to Diablo III.

Matt Good and all the other former members of Destroy Rebuild Until God Shows excluding Craig Owens who returned to Chiodos, discussed forming a new unnamed project together, but due to Good and the other two ex-members of D.R.U.G.S having to sign a contract when they first joined the band stating that they could not be a band without Owens, they could not carry on with this new project.

=== From First to Last Reunion (2013–Present) ===
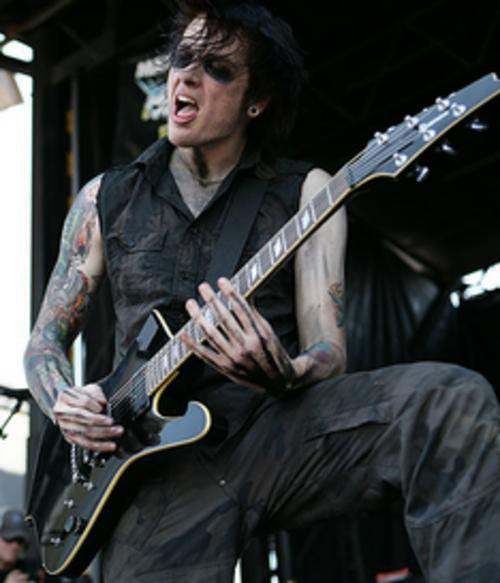
Good with From First to Last

In November 2013, it was announced that FFTL would be reuniting. The lineup would consist of Good, Travis Richter, Derek Bloom and Matt Manning. Bloom was unable to take part in the reunion, so Good recruited Taylor Larson on guitar, Spencer Sotelo of Periphery on vocals, and Ernie Slenkovich on drums. FFTL's Kickstarter project was successfully funded in late 2013. Their original goal was to write and record an EP, but they ultimately decided to release an LP. That full-length album, titled "Dead Trees," was released in April 2015 under Sumerian Records. FFTL played their first reunion show with Black Veil Brides on Halloween night of 2014 at the Marquee Theater in Tempe, Arizona. They went on to complete a short West coast U.S. tour in December 2014.

=== Kill It With Fire (2016) ===
In October 2016, Matt announced via Twitter that he is involved in a new band called Kill It With Fire. The band includes Matt Good on vocals and guitar, along with Ben Bruce from Asking Alexandria on guitar, and Zack Hansen from The Word Alive on bass,(drummer TBA). Matt Good stated "It's gonna be pretty pop punk, but not too pop punk. Just the right amount". Matt also stated the record will probably be done by Christmas. However, all tweets regarding the project has since been deleted and has not been mentioned since, placing the status of project in unknown.

=== Good Sounds and Music Production ===
Aside from performing, Good runs a recording studio in Tempe, Arizona called Good Sounds where he produces, mixes, and masters full-length albums and EPs. He works closely with K&Z Entertainment and has many releases to his name. He has worked with many big bands such as Asking Alexandria, The Word Alive, and Attila.

== Discography ==
with From First to Last

Year	Artist	Album	Label	Credits
2003	From First to Last	Aesthetic	Four Leaf Recordings	Guitarist/Vocalist
2004	From First to Last	Dear Diary, My Teen Angst Has a Body Count	Epitaph Records	Guitarist/Backing Vocalist
2006	From First to Last	Heroine	Epitaph Records	Guitarist/Backing Vocalist
2008	From First to Last	From First to Last	Suretone/Interscope Records	Guitarist/Vocalist
2010	From First to Last	Throne to the Wolves	Rise Records	Guitarist/Vocalist
2015	From First to Last	Dead Trees	Sumerian Records	Producer/Writer/Guitarist/Backing Vocalist

with Destroy Rebuild Until God Shows (D.R.U.G.S.)

Year	Artist	Album	Label	Credits
2011	D.R.U.G.S.	D.R.U.G.S.	Decaydance Records	Guitarist/Backing Vocalist

as a producer

Year	Artist	Album	Credits
2026	Escape the Fate	The Last Goodbye	Producer/Mixer/Co-Writer
2026	Sleeping With Sirens	An Ending in Itself	Mixer
2026	TX2	The End of Us	Producer/Mixer/Co-Writer
2025	Survive Said the Prophet	Luv Sux Sessions	Producer/Mixer
2025	TX2	"Hollow Frame"	Producer/Composer/Mixer
2025	Archers	Temporary High EP	Producer/Writer
2025	Keep Close	Let You In EP	Producer/Writer/Mixer
2025	Nerv	Lost EP	Producer/Co-Writer
2025	TX2	"Infamous"	Producer/Composer/Mixer
2025	Arsenic Kitchen	"G.S.S."	Producer
2024	Remember the Monsters	Hostage EP	Producer
2024	Escape the Fate	"M.O.N.S.T.E.R"	Producer
2024	TX2	Cruel World EP	Writer/Mixer/Guitar/Producer
2024	Remember the Monsters	"Toxic"	Producer
2024	Danny Rose	Danny Rose EP	Producer/Writer "Treading Water", "Too Long", "Better Than Yesterday"
2024	TX2	"Vendetta"	Producer/Mixer
2024	Az The World Burnz	"Kiss From A Rose"	Producer
2023	TX2	Ghost of LA EP	Writer/Producer "Black Wedding", "6 Seconds Left"
2023	Hyro the Hero	Bound for Glory	Producer/Composer/Mixer
2023	Asking Alexandria	Where Do We Go from Here?	Producer/Mixer/Co-Writer
2023	The Word Alive	Hard Reset	Producer/Writer "One of Us", "Fade Away", "War With You"
2023	Eerie Weather	Pale Flowers	Producer/Mixer/Co-Writer "Colorless"
2023	Butcher Babies	Eye for an Eye...	Producer/Mixer/Co-Writer
2023	Zillion	Chew EP	Producer/Writer/Mixer "Chew", "The Basement", "War Inside of Me"
2022	Hyro the Hero	"Retaliation Generation"	Producer/Composer/Mixer
2022	Capsize	"Fading Face"	Producer/Writer/Mixer
2022	Dragged Under	Upright Animals	Composer/Mixer
2021	Gemini Syndrome	3rd Degree - The Raising	Producer/Co-Writer
2021	Asking Alexandria	See What's on the Inside	Producer
2021	Johnny 3 Tears	The Abyss	Producer/Writer/Engineer
2021	The Haunt	Social Intercourse EP	Producer/Writer/Engineer/Mixer
2020
2020	Hollywood Undead	New Empire, Vol. 2	Producer/Co-Writer/Engineer
2020	The Word Alive	"Pardon Me"	Producer
2020	Asking Alexandria	Like a House on Fire	Producer
2020	Paul Bartolome	Screaming Through the Radio	Producer
2020	Stitched Up Heart	Darkness	Producer/Guitar/Composer/Mixer
2020	Alita	"Human Nature"	Mixer
2020	Hollywood Undead	New Empire, Vol. 1	Producer/Engineer
2020	Tattoo the Scars	"Cheers To the Tragedy"	Producer
2020	Anti-Flag	20/20 Vision	Producer/Mixer/Engineer
2019	Otherwise	Defy	Producer/Composer
2019	Remember the Monsters	"Close Encounters"	Producer
2019	Sleeping with Sirens	How It Feels to Be Lost	Producer
2019	First and Forever	"Chicago"	Producer/Engineer
2019	A Fall to Break	Disaster, Destruction and After	Producer/Mixer/Mastering/Engineer
2019	Skrillex	"Mumbai Power"	Writer
2019	At My Mercy	Balance Symmetry	Producer
2019	Remember the Monsters	"Sink"	Producer
2019	Famous Last Words	Arizona EP	Producer
2018	After the Calm	"Stuck on Repeat"	Producer
2018	Capsize	"Fragile"	Producer
2018	Never Us	Retrograde EP	Producer/Guest Vocals
2018	Hollywood Undead	"Another Level"	Producer
2018	The Word Alive	Violent Noise	Producer/Mixer
2018	Blessthefall	Hard Feelings	Co-Producer
2018	Attila	"Callout 2"	Producer
2018	American Avenue	"Make War"	Writer
2018	Amor	Love vs. Logic	Producer/Composer
2017	Asking Alexandria	Asking Alexandria	Producer
2017	Beyond Unbroken	Don't Wake the Dead EP	Producer
2017	Ded	"Architect"	Mixer
2017	Memphis May Fire	"Virus"	Producer
2017	The Word Alive	"Misery"	Producer
2016	Note to Self	"Agony Complete"	Producer
2016	Upon a Burning Body	Straight From The Barrio	Producer
2016	Whitney Peyton	Firecracker	Producer
2016	Caroline Burt	"100"	Producer
2016	Romance Mechanics	Ghost Stories EP	Producer/Mixer
2016	Memphis May Fire	This Light I Hold	Producer/Mixer
2016	Stands With Fists	"The Meaning"	Producer
2016	At My Mercy	At My Mercy EP	Producer
2016	The Word Alive	Dark Matter	Producer/Co-Writer
2016	Vampires Everywhere!	Ritual	Producer/Co-Writer
2016	Orenda	In Difference	Producer
2015	Run 2 Cover	Lovesick	Producer/Co-Writer
2015	From First to Last	Dead Trees	Producer/Co-Writer
2015	Veil of Maya	Matriarch	Programming
2015	Message to the Masses	Means to an End EP	Producer/Co-Writer
2015	Animus Complex	Immersion	Producer
2015	Stands with Fists	Cinematic Mind	Producer/Co-Writer
2015	Nekrogoblikon	Heavy Meta	Mixer
2015	Ella Kaye	Comas Collide EP	Producer/Co-Writer
2014	Capture	Reign of Terror	Producer/Co-Writer
2014	Some Call Us Heroes	Destinations EP	Producer/Co-Writer
2014	Crisis In Victory	Drown Your Sorrows EP	Producer/Co-Writer
2014	Chivalry Is Dead	This Is Rebellion EP	Producer/Co-Writer
2014	Straight on 'til Morning	Ruckus EP	Producer/Mixer
2013	Chivalry Is Dead	To Those Who Are Abandoned EP	Producer/Co-Writer
