= Dead Trees =

Studio album by From First to Last
- Released: April 23, 2015
- Recorded: 2014–2015
- Genres: Post-hardcore; metalcore
- Length: 34:29
- Label: Sumerian
- Producers: Matt Good; Taylor Larson; Spencer Sotelo

From First to Last chronology
Throne to the Wolves (2010)	Dead Trees (2015)	We Were Bleeding Anyway (2026)

Singles from Dead Trees
- 1. "Dead Trees" Released: November 24, 2014; 2. "Black and White" Released: April 7, 2015; 3. "I Solemnly Swear That I Am Up to No Good" Released: April 20, 2015

Dead Trees ratings
Review scores
Source	Rating
The Circle Pit	8/10
Sputnikmusic	1.5/5

Dead Trees is the fifth studio album by post-hardcore band From First to Last, released April 23, 2015, via Sumerian Records. It is the first and only release to feature vocalist Spencer Sotelo (singer of progressive metal band Periphery), Taylor Larson as third guitarist, and new drummer, Ernie Slenkovich (original drummer Derek Bloom would return to the band in 2017). Returning to the group is guitarist/vocalist and founder Travis Richter, who had left the band in 2009. The band planned for the release to be an EP but due to the success of their Kickstarter campaign, the band had enough money to fund this LP.

== Track listing ==
All tracks are written by Spencer Sotelo, Matt Good, Travis Richter, Taylor Larson, Matt Manning and Ernie Slenkovich, except where noted.

No.	Title	Length
1.	"Heresy..."	1:09
2.	"Straight to the Face"	1:49
3.	"H8 Meh"	3:30
4.	"Dead Trees"	4:04
5.	"I Solemnly Swear That I Am Up to No Good"	3:07
6.	"Black and White"	3:46
7.	"Back to Hannalei"	3:19
8.	"Never in Reverie"	3:47
9.	"2 11"	3:46
10.	"Electrified"	2:57
11.	"I Don't Wanna Live in the Real World"	3:20
Total length:		34:29

Bonus track
No.	Title	Writer(s)	Length
12.	"Note to Self" (Remake)	Good, Richter, Bloom, Jon Weisberg	4:01
13.	"Ride the Wings of Pestilence" (Remake)	Good, Richter, Bloom, Weisberg	3:40
14.	"The Latest Plague" (Remake)	Good, Richter, Bloom, Sonny Moore	3:23
Total length:			46:04

== Personnel ==
- Spencer Sotelo – lead vocals, production
- Matt Good – lead guitar, co-lead vocals, keyboards, programming, production
- Travis Richter – rhythm guitar, unclean and background vocals
- Taylor Larson – lead and rhythm guitar, production, sound engineer, mixing, mastering
- Matt Manning – bass guitar, background unclean vocals
- Ernie Slenkovich – drums, percussion, pro tools editing, additional tracking
- Unlimited Visual – artwork, layout

== Charts ==
Chart performance
Chart (2015)	Peak position
US Independent Albums (Billboard)	12
US Top Alternative Albums (Billboard)	20
US Top Current Album Sales (Billboard)	99
US Top Hard Rock Albums (Billboard)	5
US Top Rock Albums (Billboard)	27
