= Youthanize =

Studio album by The Color of Violence
- Released: April 7, 2009
- Recorded: Winter 2008
- Genres: Grindcore, mathcore, screamo, experimental rock
- Length: 28:30
- Label: Epitaph
- Producers: Travis Richter, Lee Dyess, Derek Bloom

Professional ratings
Review scores
Source	Rating
Alternative Press	4/5 stars
Artistdirect	3/5 stars

Youthanize is the debut full-length album by grindcore band The Color of Violence. It was released under Epitaph Records on April 7, 2009. The album was made purely for fun as guitarist and vocalist stated, "It may not be groundbreaking, and it may not sell any copies, but we tried to be ourselves and experiment, and we're all really happy with the way it turned out, so fuck it."

== Track listing ==
No.	Title	Length
1.	"Rock Music" (Pixies cover)	1:53
2.	"Large Hardon Collider"	2:13
3.	"God Gave Me Deeze Nutz"	1:24
4.	"Me and My Enormous Spiritual Erection"	1:56
5.	"Youthanize"	1:57
6.	"Christina, Christina" (featuring Matt Mehana of I Set My Friends On Fire)	1:38
7.	"Create a Merkaba, and Get Me Outta Here!"	2:01
8.	"Crapandemic"	2:50
9.	"Even I Use to Be Sex"	1:26
10.	"Look! I Made It! I'm Dating an Actress!"	4:37
11.	"Un-cool" (Hidden track)	6:35
Total length:		28:30

== Personnel ==
Credits for Youthanize adapted from Allmusic.

=== Musicians ===
The Color of Violence

- Travis Richter – lead vocals, guitars, composer
- Derek Bloom – drums, guitars, bass guitar, percussion, keyboards, synthesizers, programming, composer

Session musicians

- Matt Mehana – composer, vocals on "Christina, Christina"
- Matt Manning – bass guitar, additional vocals
- Wes Borland – bass guitar
- Josh Lasseter – backing vocals

=== Production ===
- Lee Dyess – production, mixing, engineering, tambourine
- Dan Shike – mastering
- Travis Richter – production
- Derek Bloom – production
- Nabil Moo – production
- Nick Pritchard – artwork, design

- Joey Antillion – composer
- Chad Crews – composer
- Matt Good – composer
- Charles Thompson – composer
- Jon Syverson – composer, drums
- Joel Croan – composer, drums
