= Beyond Unbroken (band) =

American rock band

- Origin: Las Vegas, Nevada, U.S.
- Genres: Post-hardcore; metalcore; alternative rock; emo; alternative metal; pop rock
- Years active: 2013–present
- Label: FiXT
- Spinoff of: Escape the Fate
- Members: Monte Money; Michael Money; Ashley Davis; Chas Cantrell
- Past members: Zach Snell; Matti Hoffman; Cameron Daly; Daimen Horrell
- Website: Beyond Unbroken on Facebook

Beyond Unbroken is an American rock band formed by former Escape the Fate members Monte and Michael Money in 2013. The band was initially named "Money Brothers" until the name change to "Beyond Unbroken" with the release of their debut EP "Don't Wake the Dead" in 2017, and their debut album "Running Out of Time" in 2020. the band's second album, "Destruction", was released in 2024.

== History ==
=== Formation (2013–2015) ===
After their departure from Escape the Fate, Monte and his brother Michael started a new solo project called Money Brothers. They released two singles before rebranding. "Break Free" was released in October 2013, and "Clarity (Behind the Curtain)" in February 2014.

The Money's revealed "Money Brothers" would be put on hold indefinitely to focus on a new project. "Beyond Unbroken" was created shortly after joined by Daimen Horrell as the official bassist, and Matti Hoffman as the official lead guitarist.

=== Recent works (2015–present) ===
On October 30, 2015, their first single titled "Under Your Skin" was released.

On February 22, 2016, the single "Dont Wake the Dead" was released. in "Don't Wake the Dead," the lyrics "fuck your fate" could be read as an insult to Escape the Fate. However, Monte says that's not the case. "The song lyric has nothing to do toward the Escape the Fate band. That lyric in that particular song means fate is irrelevant to those who strongly believe in destiny." On March 30, 2016, The band released their first music video for the single "Losing My Mind" debuting on Alternative Press.

On August 29, 2017, the band released a new single entitled "Overdose" accompanied by an animated video. with the release of the video it was also announced Matti Hoffman had left the band as a full time member to pursue other musical endeavors, but would be joining the band for their "Blackout The Sun Tour". On September 1, 2017, the band's debut EP "Don't Wake the Dead" was released. This EP was produced by Matt Good.

On August 17, 2018, the band released their final video off the "Don't Wake the Dead" EP for the song "Memories". In December 2019, the band parted ways with Daimen Horrell due to creative differences.

On February 7, 2020, the band released two singles titled "Enemy" and "In My Head". On April 3, 2020, the band's debut album "Running Out of Time" was released. On April 29, 2020, the band covered Lil Peep and Twenty One Pilots mashup, "Falling Down + Heathens". On June 10, 2021, the band released the single titled "Silver Spoon". On July 14, 2021, the band released the single "With or Without Me". On December 14, 2021, the band released an acoustic version of "Memories".

On September 8, 2023, the band released "Running Out of Time" Deluxe Edition and also announced the band's signing with the FiXT label with new lineup changes.

== Band members ==
Current

- Monte Money – clean vocals, guitar (2013–present), drums (2013–2015; 2018–2023; studio only)
- Michael Money – lead guitar (2013–2015; 2017–present), unclean vocals (2015–present), rhythm guitar (2015–2017)
- Ashley Davis – bass, backing vocals (2023–present)
- Chas Cantrell – drums (2023–present)

Former

- Patrick Crisci – unclean vocals, bass (2013–2015)
- Zach Snell – drums (2015–2016)
- Matti Hoffman – lead guitar (2015–2017)
- Cameron Daly – drums (2017–2018)
- Daimen Horrell – bass, backing vocals (2015–2019)

== Discography ==
EPs

- Don't Wake the Dead (2017)

Studio albums

- Running Out of Time (2020)
- Destruction (2024)

== Music videos ==
Title	Year	Director	Link
"Losing My Mind"	2016	Marcus Eden	
"Overdose"	2017	Davie Brown	
"Memories"	2018	Jacob Reynolds	
"In My Head"	2020	Lance Gergar	
"Running Out of Time"	2020	Lance Gergar	
"Silver Spoon"	2021	Lance Gergar	
"With Or Without Me"	2021	Michael & Monte Money	
"Memories (Acoustic)"	2021	Michael & Monte Money	
"Blood On My Hands"	2023	Michael & Monte Money	
"The Madness"	2024	Monte Money	
"Destruction"	2024	Michael Levine	
