= Error Boy =

Studio album by Lil Lotus
- Released: August 20, 2021
- Genre: Pop punk
- Length: 29:28
- Label: Epitaph
- Producer: John Feldmann

Lil Lotus chronology
All My Little Scars, Vol. 3 (2020)	Error Boy (2021)	Nosebleeder (2023)

Error Boy (stylized as ERRØR BØY) is the debut studio album by American rapper Lil Lotus, released through Epitaph Records, on August 20, 2021.

== Background and recording ==
Lil Lotus released his debut single "Romantic Disaster", featuring Chrissy Costanza, on May 25, 2021. For his debut album, Lil Lotus worked with producers such as John Feldmann and Drew Fulk.

== Themes and influences ==
Error Boy's themes focus on overcoming drug addiction and toxic relationships.

== Critical reception ==
Kerrang! reviewer Jake Richardson praised the album, stating it "presents plenty of throwback moments", although said that there's "nothing overly original".

== Track listing ==
Error Boy track listing
No.	Title	Length
1.	"Think of Me Tonight"	3:00
2.	"Romantic Disaster" (featuring Chrissy Costanza)	2:37
3.	"Over and Over Again"	2:24
4.	"Rooftop"	2:35
5.	"Butterfly K"	2:38
6.	"Girl Next Door" (featuring Lil Aaron)	2:37
7.	"Lips That Kill"	2:34
8.	"Doctor Doctor"	2:40
9.	"No Getting Over This" (featuring Travis Barker)	2:05
10.	"Fake Love"	2:16
11.	"Why U Do Me Like This"	2:30
12.	"Don't Fuck This Up" (featuring Travis Barker)	1:56
Total length:		29:28

== Personnel ==
- Lil Lotus – vocals
- Chrissy Costanza – vocals (track 2)
- Travis Barker – drummer (tracks 9 and 12)
- John Feldmann – producer
- Drew Fulk – producer
