= From First to Last (album) =

Studio album by From First to Last
- Released: May 6, 2008
- Recorded: August–September, 2007
- Genres: Post-hardcore; screamo; alternative rock; emo
- Length: 39:02
- Labels: Suretone; Interscope
- Producer: Josh Abraham

From First to Last chronology
| Heroine (2006) | From First to Last (2008) | Throne to the Wolves (2010) |

Singles from From First to Last
- 1. "Two as One" Released: November 14, 2007; 2. "Worlds Away" Released: April 1, 2008

From First to Last is the third studio album by American post-hardcore band From First to Last, released on May 6, 2008 through Suretone and Interscope Records. "Two as One" is the album's first single, which hit the radio on March 17. It is the band's first full-length album without lead vocalist Sonny Moore, with the band's guitarist, Matt Good, filling the role. In contrast to the band's previous album Heroine, the album features a more accessible, alternative rock sound.

From First To Last received mixed reviews from critics, and its change in sound alienated the band's fanbase. Subsequently, despite being given a high profile marketing campaign by Suretone, the album underperformed commercially, and only reached number 81 on the Billboard 200; as a result, the band split from the label the following year.

Professional ratings
Review scores
| Source | Rating |
|---|---|
| AllMusic | 3/5 stars |
| Alternative Press | 2/5 stars |
| AbsolutePunk.net | (68%) |
| Kerrang! | 3/5 stars |

== Background ==
The first song on the album to be released was "Two As One", through the band's MySpace in November 2007. On January 23, one of the songs from the new album, "We All Turn Back to Dust", was released exclusively through Billboard.com.

On February 12, From First to Last released an exclusive 2-song CD through Hot Topic which featured the songs "We All Turn Back to Dust" and "I Once Was Lost, But Now Am Profound" from the band's then-upcoming album, the former of which was also released through Billboard.com. This release coincided with a Hot Topic in-store performance in Novi, Michigan on February 13. A limited quantity of the exclusive CD was available at the 2008 Take Action Tour. The song information from "We All Turn Back to Dust" revealed that the album would have 11 tracks.

"Tick Tick Tomorrow" appeared as a remix on the Underworld: Rise of the Lycans OST. Several songs from the album also appeared in Electronic Arts video games. FaceBreaker features "We All Turn Back to Dust” and "Worlds Away”. NASCAR 09, NHL 09, and Madden NFL 09 features "Two As One", and "Worlds Away”. Need for Speed: Undercover features "I Once Was Lost, But Now Am Profound”.

== Track listing ==
All tracks are written by Matt Good, Travis Richter and Derek Bloom, except where noted.

| No. | Title | Writer(s) | Length |
|---|---|---|---|
| 1. | "Two as One" | Bloom, Richter, Good, Matt Manning | 3:21 |
| 2. | "The Other Side" | | 3:41 |
| 3. | "Worlds Away" | | 4:03 |
| 4. | "We All Turn Back to Dust" | | 4:01 |
| 5. | "Medicinal Reality" | | 3:09 |
| 6. | "A Perfect Mess" | | 4:24 |
| 7. | "Tick Tick Tomorrow" (On the special Hot Topic Edition this track is called "Swallow" on the back) | | 3:27 |
| 8. | "Deliverance!" | | 3:40 |
| 9. | "I Once Was Lost, But Now Am Profound" | | 3:39 |
| 10. | "Be-Headed (Marathon Man)" | | 3:43 |
| 11. | "In Memorium in Advance" | | 1:58 |
| Total length: | | | 39:02 |

Hot Topic version
| No. | Title | Writer(s) | Length |
|---|---|---|---|
| 12. | "Everything's Perfect" | Bloom, Richter, Good, Manning | 2:47 |
| Total length: | | | 41:49 |

iTunes version
| No. | Title | Length |
|---|---|---|
| 12. | "Worlds Away" (acoustic) | 4:25 |
| Total length: | | 43:27 |

European version
| No. | Title | Length |
|---|---|---|
| 12. | "Tick Tick Tomorrow" (acoustic) | 3:42 |
| Total length: | | 42:44 |

Japanese version
| No. | Title | Length |
|---|---|---|
| 12. | "Tick Tick Tomorrow" (acoustic) | 3:42 |
| 13. | "Medicinal Reality" (acoustic) | 3:42 |
| Total length: | | 46:42 |

== Personnel ==
From First to Last

- Matt Good – clean vocals, lead guitar
- Travis Richter – rhythm guitar, screamed vocals
- Matt Manning – bass, background unclean vocals
- Derek Bloom – drums

Production

- Josh Abraham – production
- Ryan Williams – sound engineer
- Marcus Samperio – assistant engineer
- Tom Syrowski – assistant engineer
- Ted Jensen – mastering
- Brendan O'Brien – mixing
- Luke Walker – additional vocal production

Additional musicians

- Ken Pattengale – slide guitar (tracks 4, 5), keyboards (track 10)
- Lee Dyess – cello (track 11)
- Ryan Williams – keyboards (tracks 3, 7), additional guitars (track 9)
- Josh Lasseter – keyboards (track 11)

== Charts ==
The album sold 9,765 copies in its first week; less than one-third of the band's previous release Heroine which sold 33,000 copies in its first week.

Chart performance
| Chart (2008) | Peak position |
|---|---|
| US Billboard 200 | 81 |
| US Top Alternative Albums (Billboard) | 18 |
| US Top Hard Rock Albums (Billboard) | 7 |
| US Top Rock Albums (Billboard) | 25 |
