= The Color of Violence =

American band

- Also known as: Skeleton Slaughter vs. Fetus Destroyer (2002–2003); Cholera Violins (2021–present)
- Origin: Tampa, Florida, U.S.
- Genres: Grindcore; screamo; sasscore; mathcore; digital hardcore
- Years active: 2001–2003, 2006–2009, 2017–present
- Label: Epitaph
- Spinoffs: If I Die First
- Spinoff of: From First To Last
- Members: Travis Richter; Derek Bloom
- Past members: Matt Good; Joey Antillon; Chad Crews; Jon Syverson

The Color of Violence is an American experimental hardcore band, currently a side project of the post-hardcore band From First to Last. It features drummer Derek Bloom and vocalist/guitarist Travis Richter.

== History ==
=== Formation and early history (2002–2006) ===
The Color of Violence formed in 2002 originally as a full-time band under the name Skeleton Slaughter vs. Fetus Destroyer. The members attempted to make music that resembled grindcore, specifically the band Discordance Axis. It featured Travis Richter, Derek Bloom, Matt Good, Joey Antillion and Chad Crews. After changing the name to The Color of Violence then recording and releasing an EP and touring in early 2003, all members but Crews put most of their attention into From First to Last (then under the name "First too Last"). Between 2003 and most of 2006, The Color of Violence saw little to no activity.

By the end of 2006, Richter and Bloom decided to return to making music as The Color of Violence as a two-piece band. In 2006 they sent a couple of songs to Brett Gurewitz, founder and CEO of Epitaph Records and guitarist for punk rock band Bad Religion. At this time, From First to Last was also signed to Epitaph, but have since switched to Interscope Records, and later Rise Records.

=== Youthanize (2007–2009) ===
December 19, 2007, COV released a bulletin via their MySpace, announcing they would be recording next year.

The Color of Violence will be documenting tones and patterns in January of '08. Please don't ask any questions as we have only booked the studio time and have absolutely no idea what we are going to record, just know that its going to be some of the following adjectives, "Brutal" ,"Far out", "Hip" "Gay","Not gay" and then of course "Really gay" Respectively yours, Guy&Glitch The Color of Violence"

Recently, the band posted a re-recorded version of “God Gave Me Deeze Nutzz” on their MySpace page. The album is listed as “Youthanize Demos”.

November 10, 2008, FFTL released a bulletin via their MySpace, announcing that an album for COV will be out in 2009.

"CONSTIPATED? relieve yourself with knowing that Derek and I of from first to last are recording our other band The Color of Violence right now and its slated to come out on epitaph in early '09 like march or april.. We had the awesome pleasure of flying in two sick drummers for this recording..JonSyverson from Daughters and Joel Coan from The Felix Culpa.. We have 11 songs for this release and are really excited to do some high octane shred! Add us on myspace or facebook! we are trying to build up our fanbase online so we can tour and what not one day!"

From First to Last announced on December 31, 2008, that a new single will be released in January for the band Color of Violence. The song, a cover of the Pixies' “Rock Music”, was released on February 12, on the band's MySpace page.

The Color of Violence played at the 2009 Warped Tour on the Pomona stop on June 26.

The Color of Violence also supported From First to Last on their tour in October 2009 with their sign to Rise Records.

As of late 2009, Travis Richter parted ways with From First to Last. He then became the vocalist for progressive metal band The Human Abstract.

=== New Music and Cholera Violins (2017–present) ===
Around April 2017, the band's Twitter became active, Travis himself also tweeted out on July 11: "pumped on the new @colorofviolence !! Jams are turning out exciting and refreshing"

On February 9, 2018, they released a new single called "Dreadophile". This followed a long period of teases from the band and two official mixtapes.

In late 2021, the band began releasing Singles under the name Cholera Violins to "release more moody and mellow songs that don't completely fit with The Color of Violence". Unlike the bands earlier grindcore/hardcore work, Cholera Violins is heavily inspired by New Wave and atmospheric Dark Wave.

== Band members ==
Current

- Travis Richter (Guy Nucleosity) – lead vocals (2002–2003, 2006–2009, 2017–present); guitars (2006–2009, 2017–present)
- Derek Bloom (Glitch Killgasm) – drums, percussion (2002–2003, 2006–2009, 2017–present); all instruments (2006–2009, 2017–present)

Former

- Matt Good – lead guitar, vocals (2002–2003)
- Joey Antillion – bass (2002–2003)
- Chad Crews – rhythm guitar (2002–2003)
- Jon Syverson – drums, percussion (2009)

Touring/session

- Joel Croan – drums, percussion (2008–2009)
- Chris Lent – drums, percussion, keyboards (2009)
- Wes Borland – bass (2008–2009)
- Matt Manning – bass (2008–2009)

== Discography ==
Studio albums

- Youthanize (2009)
- FALSE METAL FOREVER (2020)

EPs

- Winter Tour EP (2003)
- Demo 2005 (2005)
- Cholera Violins (2020)

Mixtapes

- Halloween (2017)
- I Can't Believe It's Not Garbage Vol.1 (2017)
- Fright Fiesta (2019)
- Halloween Dreams (2021)
- Dead Dreams Halloween (2022)

Singles

- Dreadophile (2018)
- Miine (2020)
