= Headway (band) =

British Britpop revival band

- Origin: Hucknall, Nottingham, England
- Genres: Indie rock, pop rock, post-Britpop, alternative rock
- Years active: 2003–2009
- Labels: Suretone; Interscope; Geffen
- Members: David Wright; Joe Watts; Jason Wright; Thomas Harrison; Dave Astbury
- Past members: Johnny Dakers
- Website: www.myspace.com/headway

Headway was a five-piece British Britpop revival band from Hucknall, Nottinghamshire. In early 2003, childhood friends singer/guitarist, David Wright, and guitarist, Joe Watts, recruited two more members. These were Dave Astbury on bass and Johnny Dakers on drums (later replaced by David Wright's brother Jay). The keyboardist Tom Harrison was added and Headway had fully formed.

They gained a following within the English club scene, and struck a recording contract with the newly founded Suretone Records after Jordan Schur, the label's president, saw one of their concerts. Their song "Lord Knows" appeared on the US television program, ER.

Headway toured with OneRepublic during the UK leg of their tour.

== Discography ==
=== EPs ===
Year	EP details
2008	The Start EP: Label: Suretone/Interscope

=== Singles ===
2008	"Remind Me To Miss You"	#56 (UK Indie Chart)
2009	"Lord Knows"	#8 (UK Indie Chart), No. 63 (UK Singles Chart), No. 42 (US Modern Rock)
