= Dear Diary, My Teen Angst Has a Bodycount =

Studio album by From First to Last
- Released: June 28, 2004
- Recorded: February 2004
- Genres: Post-hardcore; emo; screamo; scene; punk rock; heavy metal; hardcore punk
- Length: 38:07
- Label: Epitaph
- Producers: Lee Dyess, From First to Last

From First to Last chronology
Aesthetic (2003)	Dear Diary, My Teen Angst Has a Bodycount (2004)	Heroine (2006)

Singles from Dear Diary, My Teen Angst Has a Bodycount
- 1. "Populace In Two" Released: August 17, 2004; 2. "Ride the Wings of Pestilence" Released: October 8, 2004; 3. "Note to Self" Released: January 26, 2005

Professional ratings
Review scores
Source	Rating
Allmusic	3/5 stars

Dear Diary, My Teen Angst Has a Bodycount is the debut studio album by American post-hardcore band From First to Last. It was released on June 28, 2004, through Epitaph Records. The album peaked at number 12 on the US Top Heatseekers chart and number 21 on the Top Independent Albums.

== Background ==
The title was taken from a monologue in the film Heathers, in which Winona Ryder's character is writing in her diary. Production was handled by Lee Dyess and the band themselves. The album was remastered by Beau Burchell from Saosin, however, it is not indicated on the personnel, possibly due to a contemporary feud between the band.

== Music and lyrics ==
Dear Diary, My Teen Angst Has a Bodycount is considered to be a "scene album" by some publications, such as Alternative Press. The album has variously been described as post-hardcore, emo screamo, punk rock, heavy metal and hardcore punk. The album also incorporates other elements of heavy metal, such as double kick drumming. Lead vocalist Sonny Moore incorporates clean singing, while guitarist Travis Richter and bassist Jon Weisberg incorporate screaming. Some of the material has drawn comparisons to blink-182. The track "Kiss Me, I'm Contagious" incorporates dual vocals. The track "Emily" is an acoustic ballad. The album's "emo lyrics" explore themes such as heartbreak, angst, self-pity and anger.

== Critical reception ==
The album received generally mixed reviews from music critics. It reached number 12 and 21 on the Billboard Heatseekers Albums and Independent Albums chart. It spawned two singles: "Ride the Wings of Pestilence" and "Note to Self". The hidden track (commonly referred to as "Dead Baby Kickball") features contributing vocals from American rapper Major League Playa. "Populace in Two" was included in the soundtrack for the video game Burnout 3: Takedown. It was released on the iTunes store for download on July 26, 2005.

Loudwire named "Note to Self" the best emo track of 2005.

== Track listing ==
All tracks are written by Matt Good, Travis Richter, Jon Weisberg and Derek Bloom.

No.	Title	Length
1.	"Soliloquy" (Instrumental)	0:25
2.	"The One Armed Boxer vs. The Flying Guillotine"	3:18
3.	"Note to Self"	3:59
4.	"I Liked You Better Before You Were Naked on the Internet"	1:54
5.	"Featuring Some of Your Favorite Words"	4:01
6.	"Emily"	2:39
7.	"Secrets Don't Make Friends"	4:01
8.	"Populace in Two"	4:25
9.	"Kiss Me, I'm Contagious!"	3:22
10.	"Minuet" (Instrumental)	1:02
11.	"Ride the Wings of Pestilence"	3:45
12.	"Untitled"	5:16

== Personnel ==
From First to Last

- Sonny Moore – lead vocals, additional guitar, programming
- Matt Good – co-lead vocals, lead guitar, keyboard, background vocals
- Travis Richter – rhythm guitar, unclean vocals, background vocals
- Jon Weisberg – bass, unclean vocals
- Derek Bloom – drums

Additional musicians

- Major League Playa – vocals (on "Untitled")

Production

- Lee Dyess – production, mixing
- Beau Burchell – mastering, mixing
- Brian Gardner – mastering
- Nick Pritchard – album design
- Adam Krause – photography
- Cody Nierstadt – design
