= XO Stereo =

American rock band (2013–2015)

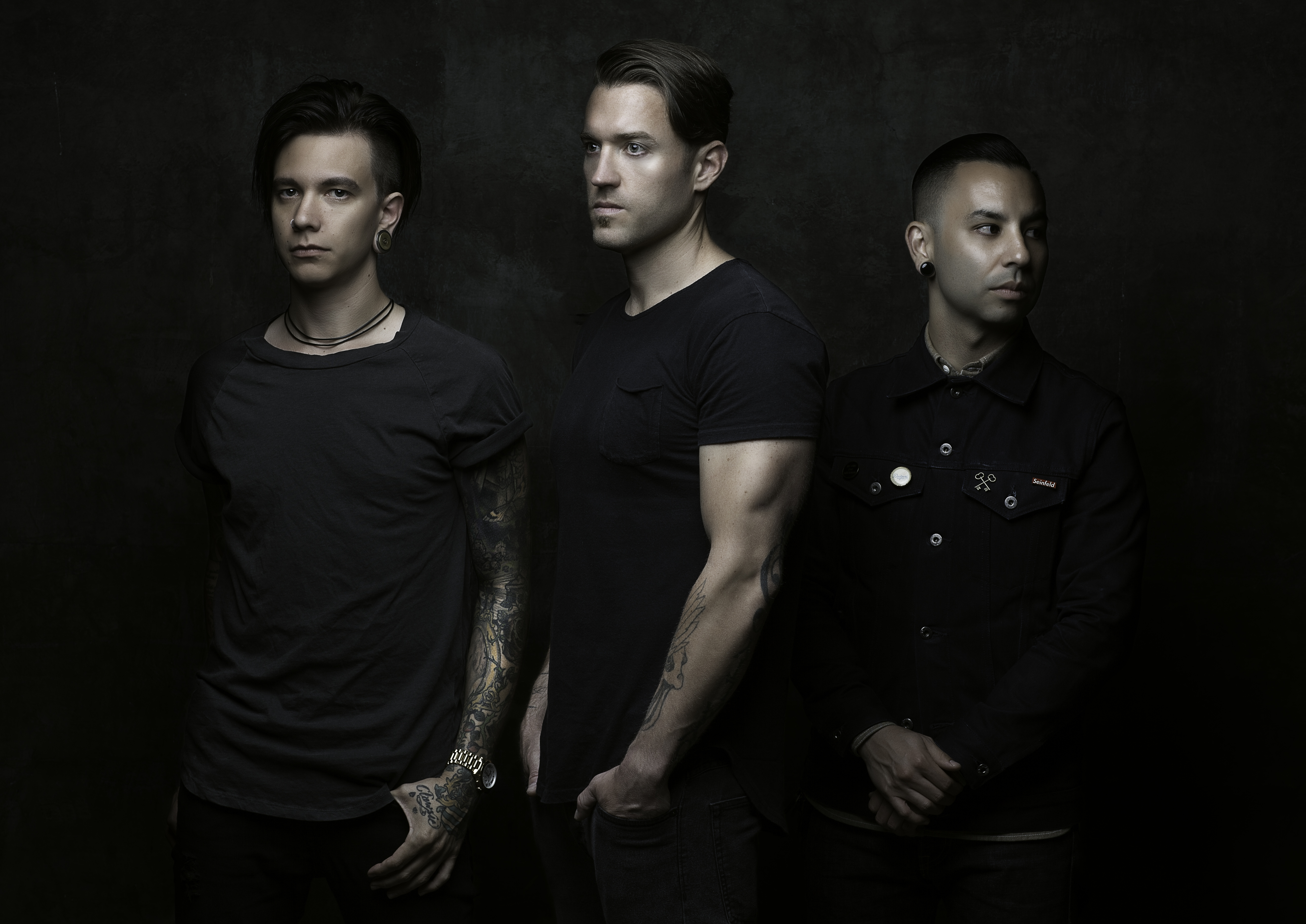
- XO Stereo promo shot by Adam Barnett, June 2015

Background information
- Origin: Los Angeles, California, United States
- Genres: Post-hardcore; pop rock; alternative rock; emo
- Years active: 2013–2015
- Labels: Another Century; RED; Sony; Century Media
- Spinoff of: LoveHateHero; I Am Ghost; Falling in Reverse; From First To Last; The Hollowed
- Past members: Cooper Campbell; Justin Whitesel; Jon Weisberg
- Website: http://www.anothercentury.com/artist.aspx?IdArtist=841

XO Stereo was an American rock band from Los Angeles, California. The band was formed in 2013 by ex-members of From First To Last, LoveHateHero, and The Hollowed and consists of lead vocalist / drummer Cooper Campbell, guitarist / keyboardist Justin Whitesel, and guitarist / bassist / keyboardist Jon Weisberg. The group was signed to Another Century Records with then became RED Music, a division of Sony Music and have released one EP entitled The Struggle. The group is known for the members past projects and the fact that each member plays multiple instruments in the band's recording process, allowing them to stay a three-piece band.

== Background ==
=== Formation ===
The band was formed by guitarist Justin Whitesel after finishing a tour with Eyes Set To Kill. He wrote multiple songs, even employing the help of longtime friend and colleague Jinxx of Black Veil Brides fame to help with recording duties. Whitesel then went on to enlist Cooper Campbell for all vocal and drum duties and Jon Weisberg, formerly of From First to Last, for all bass and additional guitar duties.

=== Show And Tell video shoot and signing with Another Century Records ===
On August 26, 2013, the band released their first single and accompanying music video for the song Show And Tell. They hired session members to fill the roles of rhythm guitar and drum duties, as Campbell would be unable to front the band as the singer and play the drums at the same time. The song was met with primarily positive reviews and even got them a feature in Substream Magazine's Top Unsigned Bands.

In September 2014, longtime friend (and former LoveHateHero bandmate) Kevin Thrasher of Escape The Fate asked the group if they’d be interested in playing their first show with them at The Glasshouse in Pomona, CA. The band agree’d and decided to employ Ronnie Ficarro (ex: Falling In Reverse) for and Justin McCarthy (ex: I Am Ghost) for all bass and drum duties, respectively.

The show gained a lot of industry attention, including Century Media Records. In June 2015, the band announced they have signed a worldwide record deal with Another Century Records under Sony Music Entertainment.

=== The Struggle EP, Working with Matt Squire, and being dropped from RED Music ===
On October 2, 2015, the band released The Struggle EP. It had a limited US-only release and received generally positive reviews from outlets throughout the nation. The album was featured on Highwire Daze's Top 10 of 2015 List, Modern Rock Review's January Choice, and was featured as a free-stream for one week on the frontpage of Substream Magazine's Website

The band was featured on the 2015 Rock the Vote social campaigns and last told fans they were to begin working on their debut full-length record with a "producer I've always dreamed of working with" according to songwriter / guitarist Justin Whitesel.

RED Music acquired Another Century and placed XO Stereo in the studio with producer Matt Squire (Panic At The Disco), however after finishing a short-run of California tour dates with The Red Jumpsuit Apparatus in 2015 the band was dropped from RED Music and they disbanded shortly after.

== Band members ==
Current members

- Cooper Campbell – lead vocals, drums, percussion (2013–2015)
- Justin Whitesel – lead guitar, keyboards, programming, backing vocals (2013–2015)
- Jon Weisberg – rhythm guitar, bass, keyboards, programming (2013–2015)

Touring members

- Ronnie Ficarro – bass, backing vocals (2014–2015)
- Justin McCarthy – drums, percussion (2014–2015)

== Discography ==
EPs

- “The Struggle” (Another Century, 2015)

== Videography ==
Year	Title	Director(s)
2013	“Show And Tell”	Theodore Kushner, Douglas Riggs
