= Lil Lotus =

American rapper (born 1994)

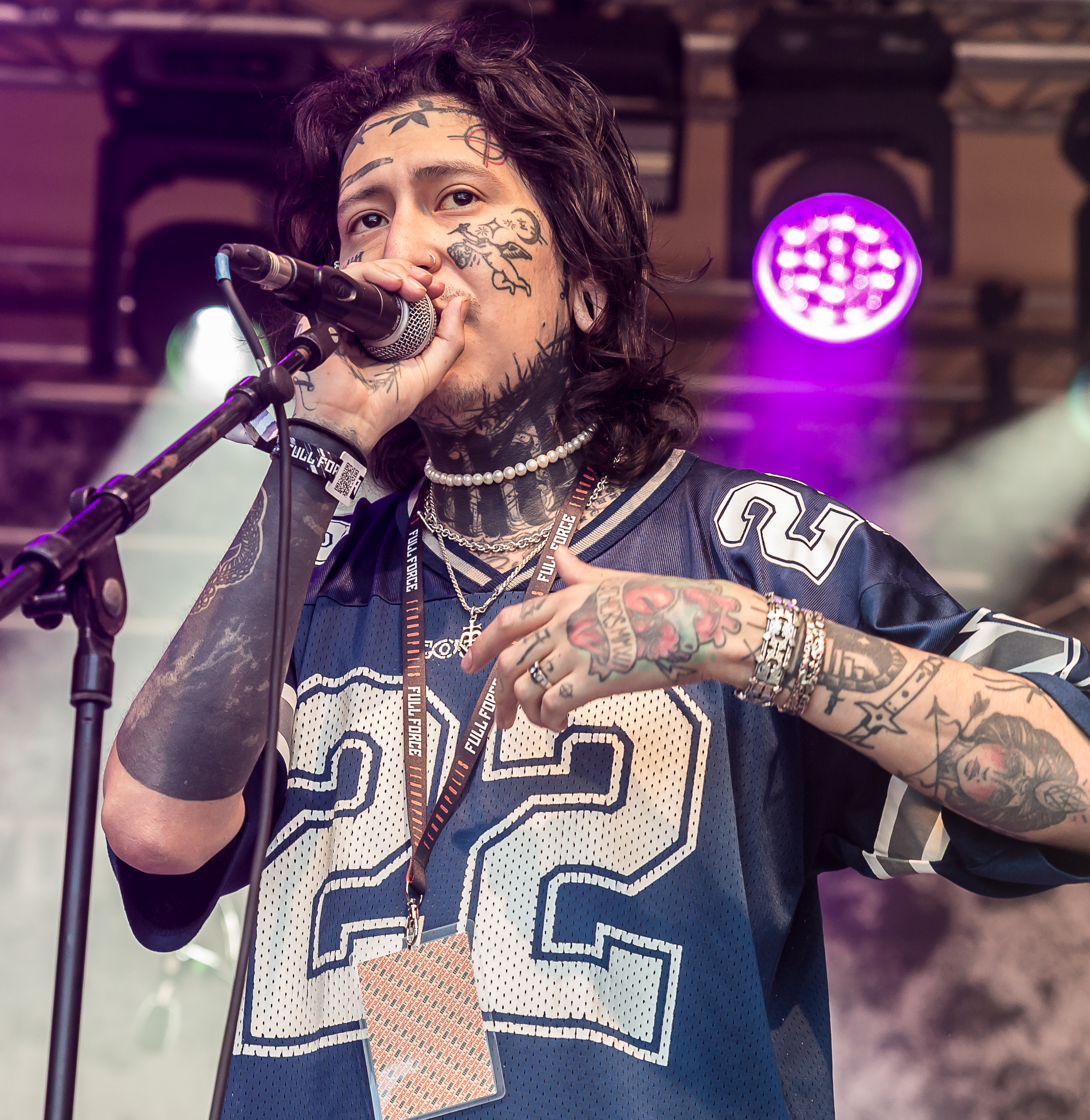
- Lil Lotus at Full Force Festival 2023

Background information
- Also known as: Tremor
- Born: John Elias Villagran III; March 1, 1994 (age 32); Dallas, Texas, U.S.
- Genres: Emo rap; post-hardcore; pop-punk; emo; metalcore; alternative hip-hop
- Occupations: Rapper; singer; songwriter; record producer
- Instruments: Vocals; guitar
- Years active: 2016–present
- Labels: Epitaph; Repost
- Member of: Boyfriendz; From First to Last; If I Die First

John Elias Villagran III (born March 1, 1994), known professionally as Lil Lotus (stylized as LiL Lotus) is an American rapper and record producer from Dallas, Texas. He has released two solo studio albums, four solo EPs, three collaborative EPs and an additional two EPs as a part of the alternative hip hop group Boyfriendz and three EPs as a member of the post-hardcore band If I Die First. In 2026, he became the lead vocalist of From First to Last.

Beginning his career playing in multiple local Texas metalcore bands, he began an acoustic solo career in 2016 under the name Tremor. After posting a number of songs on SoundCloud he became increasingly influenced by the emerging emo rap scene on the platform, which led to him taking on the Lil Lotus moniker and associating with members and affiliates of GothBoiClique.

== Early life ==
John "Elias" Villagran grew up in Pleasant Grove, Dallas, Texas with devout Christian parents. In childhood, he and his family attended Fellowship Church. His father was a musician, who introduced him to a wide variety of musical styles including jazz, reggaeton and oldies. He became influenced to make music through groups like Linkin Park and Paramore, as well as various emo and heavy metal songs that his friend had put on an iPod that Villagran had stolen. He was eventually accepted into a music and arts high school and began being taught guitar by his father. By fourteen, he and his brother were performing praise and worship music at their church, which led to him forming a Christian melodic hardcore band. His first concert was at the Palladium Ballroom at fourteen, watching Paramore, the Starting Line and the Almost. He found himself doing fill-in spots for various acts in his local metalcore scene, including Be//Gotten and Azurah, as well as becoming a frequent user of drugs such as LSD and Xanax. When Villagran was eighteen, his father died, which led him to leave home and live in his car for the following two years. He spent much of this period parked in friends' driveways and talking to his mother once a month by phone call. After returning home, he commenced his fill-in roles, organising local concerts and working day jobs in factories. The birth of his son Luca led him to stop performing with bands and begin pursuing music solo.

== Career ==
=== Solo ===
Villagran began recording and mixing acoustic solo music and uploading the songs online in 2016. At this time he was performing under the name Tremor. He soon changed his stage name to Lil Lotus, after being introduced to and becoming influenced by the sound of GothBoiClique members Wicca Phase Springs Eternal, Horse Head and Coldhart. His career began to grow as he began having tracks of his such as "Run Home" and "Scared to Die" be uploaded on YouTube channels like Astari. On June 15, 2017, he released the EP Bodybag. On September 14, 2017, he released the song "Ur Dad Has A Gun" featuring Shinigami. A music video was released for the track "Bodybag", which features Coldhart was released on January 15, 2018. From March 3 to April 6, he opened for Nothing,Nowhere on his U.S. headline tour alongside Shinigami and Jay-Vee. Between May 13 and 31, he opened for Senses Fail on their U.S. headline tour alongside Sharptooth. On August 10, he released a collaborative EP with Horse Head titled "I Did This to Myself". He was featured on the song "Don't Take Me For Pomegranate" by I Set My Friends on Fire released on September 7. From October 5 to 9, he opened for Papa Roach on their short U.S. tour, alongside Of Mice & Men. On May 31, 2019, he released a collaborative EP with I Set My Friends on Fire, featuring one track where Villagran covers I Set My Friends on Fire, one track where I Set My Friends on Fire cover Villagran and two original collaborative songs. On December 11, it was announced that he had signed to Epitaph Records, which coincided with the release of the single "Never Get Away".

On February 3, 2020, he was featured on the single "Promise" by Tisoki. On February 21, he released the song "I Don't Even Like U", as a single. On April 6, he released the song "Never Felt Better" as a single. On May 15, he released the EP All My Little Scars, Vol. 1, the first in a trilogy of EPs released in 2020. He featured on the song "Dead Roses" by Slit, which was released on July 31. On August 3, he released the EP All My Little Scars Vol. 2. On August 31, he released the final EP in the All My Little Scars trilogy. He was featured on the song "So In Love" by Danny Goo, which was released September 4, 2020. On February 16, 2021, he released the single "Girl Next Door" featuring Lil Aaron. On May 25, he released the single "Romantic Disaster" featuring Chrissy Costanza, and announced the release of his debut album Errør Bøy. On June 29, he released the single "Think of Me Tonight". On August 1, he released the single "Rooftop". Errør Bøy was officially released on August 20, 2021.

=== Boyfriendz ===
In late 2017, Villagran formed the group Boyfriendz, with Smrtdeath and Lil Aaron. They released their debut self-titled EP in December 2017. The EP was recorded in a single night and was released within a week through SoundCloud.

On February 14, 2018, Boyfriendz released their second EP BFZ2.

=== If I Die First and From First to Last ===
In 2020, he formed the band If I Die First. Villagran is the band's lead vocalist, accompanied by emo rappers Lil Zubin (clean vocals and keyboard) and Nedarb Nagrom (guitar and clean vocals), From First to Last guitarist Travis Richter (guitar and unclean vocals) and Ghostemane backing band musicians Cayle Sain (drums) and Nolan Nunes (bass). Their music has been categorised as metalcore, post-hardcore and screamo.

The members of the band met through both SoundCloud and frequenting Richter's music venue in Los Angeles. The band was formed in April 2020 with Villagran on vocals, Zubin on vocals, Nagrom on guitar and vocals, Sain on drums and Nunes on bass, with Richter joining and Zubin beginning to play keyboard by the end of the month. They took their name from Philadelphia rapper Chynna Rogers' EP In Case I Die First. Rogers was a friend of Nagrom's, who died in April 2020. On July 8 they released a music video for their debut single "Where Needles And Lovers Collide", directed by Max Beck and Ritcher, and announced the release of their debut EP My Poison Arms. On July 10, they released the EP, which consisted of six tracks. It was recorded by each member individually during the COVID-19 pandemic.

On March 30, 2021, the band announced a split EP with SeeYouSpaceCowboy called A Sure Disaster, which will be released on May 14, 2021, through Pure Noise Records. They also released a video for the collaborative single from the EP called bloodstainedeyes.

On May 10, 2026, From First to Last confirmed Villagran as their new lead vocalist.

== Personal life ==
Villagran has one child, his son named Luca. Luca was born when Villagran was twenty-one, to a woman named Miranda that he had been in a relationship with since he was nineteen. The couple broke up and got back together multiple times, but eventually broke up permanently after two years, for a year of which the relationship was long-distance, as she had moved to Oklahoma. Villagran then had a relationship with rapper Sage Aquafina, who he had become engaged to, and bought a house in Dallas with in 2019. By 2020, the couple had split up, an event which influenced multiple of his subsequent songs.

Later on in Lil Lotus' career, he became addicted to cocaine and various opiates (mainly oxycodone and fentanyl). Eventually he reached sobriety in the summer of 2019. After almost a year of sobriety, he relapsed for three months, before becoming sober once again in April 2020. He relapsed one more time and posted about it on Instagram in July 2024 when he announced he was one year clean again.

Villagran has been diagnosed with bipolar disorder. He is also openly bisexual.

== Musical style ==
Villagran's early solo music has been categorised by critics as emo rap, with Hysteria magazine hailing him as "one of the biggest influences of the emo-rap genre". However, he disavows the label himself, preferring to say that his music is simply an updated version of emo. His music often incorporates elements of Contemporary R&B, trap and pop punk. Dead Press writer Tyler Turner described his music as "push[ing] the boundaries of modern emo without falling too deeply into the trap of instrumental idleness".

On his debut album Error Boy, Villagran transitioned his music closer to pop punk.

He has cited influences including the Red Jumpsuit Apparatus, Saosin, Alesana, Escape the Fate, SeeYouSpaceCowboy, Wicca Phase Springs Eternal, Horse Head and Cold Hart.

== Filmography ==
- My New Friend Jim (TBA); acting feature debut

== Discography ==
=== Studio albums ===
Title	Album details
Error Boy	Released: August 20, 2021
Nosebleeder	Released: December 1, 2023

==== with Boyfriendz ====
Title	EP details
Boyfriendz	Released: December 6, 2017; Label: Independent; Format: Digital download, streaming
BFZ2	Released: February 14, 2019; Label: Independent; Format: Digital download, streaming

==== with If I Die First ====
Title	EP details
My Poison Arms	Released: July 10, 2020; Label: Independent; Format: Digital download, streaming
Bloodstainedeyes (split with SeeYouSpaceCowboy)	Released: May 14, 2021; Label: Pure Noise Records; Format: Digital download, streaming
They Drew Blood	Released: August 13, 2021; Label: Independent; Format: Digital download, streaming

==== Collaborative ====
Title	EP details
I Did This to Myself (with Horse Head)	Released: August 10, 2018; Label: Independent; Format: Digital download, streaming
Online Now (with I Set My Friends on Fire)	Released: January 21, 2019; Label: Death Quartz; Format: Digital download, streaming
Bullet (with Nedarb)	Released: January 21, 2020; Label: Independent; Format: Digital download, streaming

=== Extended plays ===
Title	EP details
Bodybag	Released: June 15, 2017; Label: Repost Records; Format: Digital download, streaming
All My Little Scars, Vol. 1	Released: May 15, 2020; Label: Epitaph Records; Format: Digital download, streaming
All My Little Scars, Vol. 2	Released: August 3, 2020; Label: Epitaph Records; Format: Digital download, streaming
All My Little Scars, Vol. 3	Released: August 31, 2020; Label: Epitaph Records; Format: Digital download, streaming

=== Singles ===
==== As lead artist ====
Title	Year	Album
"Ur Dad has a Gun" (featuring Shinigami)	2017	N/A
"Never Get Away"	2019	N/A
"I Don't Even Like U"	2020	All My Little Scars, Vol. 1
"Razor"	2020	All My Little Scars, Vol. 1
"Me"	2020	All My Little Scars, Vol. 2
"Never Felt Better"	2021	All My Little Scars, Vol. 3
"Girl Next Door" (featuring Lil Aaron)	2021	Error Boy
"Romantic Disaster" (featuring Chrissy Costanza)	2021	Error Boy
"Think of Me Tonight"	2021	Error Boy
"Rooftop"	2021	Error Boy
"Nosebleeder"	2023	Nosebleeder
"When Life Gives You Lemons (featuring Sophie Powers)	2023	Nosebleeder
"She's a Vampire"	2023	Nosebleeder

==== As featured artist ====
Title	Artist	Year
"Revealing Hope"	killedmyself	2016
"So Long, Goodbye"	familypet	2017
"Nightmare"	shinigami	2017
"Don't Take Me For Pomegranate"	I Set My Friends on Fire	2018
Motorola	Smrtdeath	2018
"Trying"	Supmikecheck	2019
"Promise"	Tisoki	2020
"Dead Roses"	Slit	2020
"So In Love"	Danny Goo	2020
"Scream Your Name"	Drippin So Pretty	2020
"Knock It All Down"	Scary Kids Scaring Kids	2022
"Dying World"	WITHIN DESTRUCTION	2022
"Lonely Love"	Ocean Sleeper	2024
"Sentence"	weknewnothing	2024
