= Naked Ape (band) =

Swedish band

- Origin: Stockholm, Sweden
- Genres: Indie; Electronica; Electro
- Years active: 2000–2014
- Labels: Lobotom Records, K-Werks
- Members: Jonas Mathiasson; Albion Venables; Olof Bendt
- Website: www.nakedape.se

Naked Ape is a Swedish indie/electronica band from Stockholm, formed in 2000.

Starting out as a duo (Jonas Mathiasson/Albion Venables), they gained notoriety after opening for one of the biggest Swedish indie bands at the time, Bob Hund. Their first release, entitled Television, received positive reviews from Swedish press, around the time that third member Olof Bendt joined the band. Their first album was "Anropa apornA". Their second full album, "For the Sake of the Naked Ape", secured international recognition, propelled by the popularity of their unconventional music videos for songs "Fashion Freak" and "Undo Redo" - which feature undead females entertaining the living.

== Discography ==
Slagen 12" (02/2003)

1. "Slagen" (side A)
2. "Kommer Ner Igen" (side B)

Anropa Aporna (03/2004)

1. "Loop"
2. "Stenbecksmörkt"
3. "Prima Typ"
4. "Sjätte Sinnet"
5. "Gulnad Och Blek"
6. "Anropa Aporna"
7. "Innerst Inne"
8. "Tekknisk Eld"
9. "Mr. Alter Ego"
10. "Noll Noll"

A Naked EP 12" (10/2005)

1. "Undo Redo" (side A)
2. "Fashion Freak" (side A)
3. "Super 8 Nights" (side B)
4. "C.O.M.P.U.T.E.R.U" (side B)

For the Sake of the Naked Ape (02/2006)

1. "Elsewhere"
2. "Undo Redo"
3. "Fashion freak"
4. "Super 8 Nights"
5. "Ape Machine"
6. "Television"
7. "Zombie Ape Landscape"
8. "C.O.M.P.U.T.E.R.U"
9. "When I Was a Robot"
10. "CNN Sandwich"
11. "For the Sake

Du vet det svänger (11/2014)

1. "Du vet det svänger"
