= Travis Richter =

American musician (born 1981)

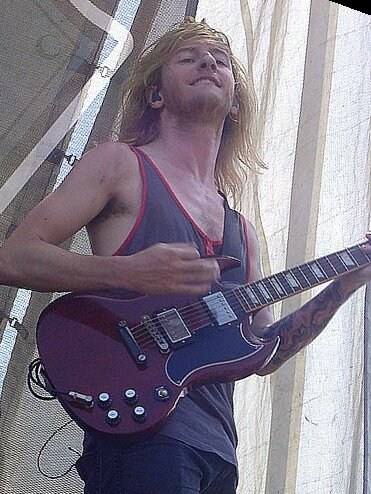
- Richter performing with From First to Last in 2008

Background information
- Also known as: The Rattlesnake, Mr. Odom, daddi long legs
- Born: Travis Brandon Richter; November 3, 1981 (age 44)
- Origin: Albany, Georgia, United States
- Genres: Post-hardcore; metalcore; dubstep; progressive metal; grindcore
- Occupations: musician, singer, record producer
- Instruments: Vocals; guitar
- Years active: 1998–present
- Labels: Epitaph; Capitol; Interscope; Rise; Hopeless; E1; Velocity
- Website: myspace.com/thecolorofviolence myspace.com/thehumanabstract lungr.net

Travis Brandon Richter (born November 3, 1981, in Albany, Georgia) is an American musician, singer and record producer. He is known for being a vocalist and guitarist in the band From First to Last and the lead vocalist of The Color of Violence and The Human Abstract. He is also a record producer (I Set My Friends on Fire, Snails, Lil Zubin, Etc.) and in 2018 cofounded a music venue in Los Angeles, CA called "1720", with Alex Alereza (Nekrogoblikon) and Brett Powell (The Human Abstract).

== Musical career ==
=== From First to Last (2002–2010, 2013–present) ===
Richter was the original guitarist/screamer of post-hardcore band From First to Last, and was featured on every release by the band, both albums and music videos. After being with the band from the beginning, From First to Last announced that Richter and the band had parted ways due to artistic differences; Not long after his departure, the band announced their indefinite hiatus after eight years of touring and four full-length albums. Upon the bands reformation, Richter rejoined the band as guitarist and scream vocals.

=== The Color of Violence (2002–2003, 2006–present) ===
Richter formed grindcore band The Color of Violence with future members of From First to Last, including current guitarist and vocalist Matt Good and drummer Derek Bloom, as well as former bassist Joe Antillion, and his friend Chad Crews on guitar. The band started as a full-time band from 2002 to 2003, but all of the members, except for Crews, decided to focus on From First to Last. However, in 2006, Richter and Bloom decided to restart the band as a two-man duo, with Richter under the alias of Guy Nucleosity and Bloom went under the alias of Glitch Killgasm. The two released their debut full-length album, Youthanize, on April 7, 2009. The band said that "[Youthanize] may not be groundbreaking, and it may not sell any copies, but we tried to be ourselves and experiment, and we're all really happy with the way it turned out..."

In 2008, Richter helped produce post-hardcore group I Set My Friends On Fire's debut album, You Can't Spell Slaughter Without Laughter, along with main producer Lee Dyess of Earthsound Recordings and additional production with former band member Nabil Moo. The band recorded their second album with Dyess in early to mid-2010, but several factors, including Moo leaving the band, pushed production to Los Angeles, California where Richter ultimately produced the album in late 2010 to early 2011. This album, entitled Astral Rejection was released on June 21, 2011.

=== The Human Abstract (2010–2011, 2012–present) ===
Richter became the third lead vocalist of the progressive metal band The Human Abstract, replacing Nathan Ells. He joined recently after his departure of From First to Last. His membership was confirmed in an interview with AbsolutePunk, where he stated that he was contacted by guitarist Andrew Tapley while he was departing from From First to Last.

=== If I Die First (2020–present) ===
In 2020, he joined the band If I Die First, consisting of Richter on guitar and unclean vocals, accompanied by emo rappers Lil Lotus (lead vocals) and Lil Zubin (clean vocals and keyboard), producer Nedarb Nagrom (guitar and clean vocals), and Ghostemane backing band musicians Cayle Sain (drums) and Nolan Nunes (bass). Their music has been categorised as metalcore, post-hardcore and screamo.

The members of the band met through both SoundCloud and frequenting Richter's music venue in Los Angeles. The band was formed in April 2020 with Villagran on vocals, Zubin on vocals, Nagrom on guitar and vocals, Sain on drums and Nunes on bass, with Richter joining and Zubin beginning to play keyboard by the end of the month. They took their name from Philadelphia rapper Chynna Rogers' EP In Case I Die First. Rogers was a friend of Nagrom's, who died in April 2020. On July 8 they released a music video for their debut single "Where Needles And Lovers Collide", directed by Max Beck and Richter, and announced the release of their debut EP My Poison Arms. On July 10, they released the EP, which consisted of six tracks. It was recorded by each member individually during the COVID-19 pandemic.

On March 30, 2021, the band announced a split EP with SeeYouSpaceCowboy called A Sure Disaster, which will be released on May 14, 2021, through Pure Noise Records. They also released a video for the collaborative single from the EP called bloodstainedeyes.

== Discography ==
With From First to Last

- Aesthetic (Four Leaf Recordings, 2003)
- Dear Diary, My Teen Angst Has a Body Count (Epitaph Records, 2004)
- Heroine (Epitaph Records, 2006)
- From First to Last (Suretone/Interscope Records, 2008)
- Dead Trees (Sumerian Records, 2015)
- Make War (Owsla / Sumerian Records, 2017)
- Surrender (Owsla / Sumerian Records, 2018)

With The Color of Violence

- Youthanize (Epitaph Records, 2009)
- Dreadophile (Suck-Mart 2018)

The Human Abstract

- Digital Veil (E1, 2011)

If I Die First

- My Poison Arms (EP) (2020)
- A Sure Disaster (Split EP w/ SeeYouSpaceCowboy) (2021)
- they drew blood (EP) (2021)

Production credits

- 2008: You Can't Spell Slaughter Without Laughter (I Set My Friends On Fire, Epitaph Records)
- 2009: Youthanize (The Color of Violence, Epitaph Records)
- 2011: Astral Rejection (I Set My Friends On Fire, Epitaph Records)
- 2011: The Consumer (Fit for an Autopsy, Black Market Activities)
- 2017: The Anthem (Snails, Slugz Music)
- 2018: Elephant March (Wooli & Mastodon, Never Say Die Records)
- 2018: Snailephant (Snails & Wooli, Slimeageddon)
- 2018: Heavy Down Pour EP (Self Released)
- 2018: Over It (Lil Lotus, Self Released)
- 2018: I'd Had Enough (Nedarb, Self Released)
