= Suretone Records =

- Parent company: Universal Music Group (2006–2010); Suretone Entertainment (2016–present)
- Founded: 2006
- Founder: Jordan Schur
- Distributors: Interscope Geffen A&M (United States) (2006–2010); Polydor Records (United Kingdom) (2006–2010); Alternative Distribution Alliance (2016–present)
- Genre: Alternative rock
- Country of origin: United States
- Location: Los Angeles, California
- Official website: suretone.com

Suretone Records is an American record label established in 2006 as a joint venture by Jordan Schur, former CEO of Geffen Records, and Interscope Records, to release alternative rock music. Several high-profile bands such as Weezer, The Cure, Rooney, New Found Glory and Angels and Airwaves remained on Geffen and carried the Suretone imprint.

The label shut down in 2010 after the failures of albums by Chris Cornell and Shwayze. In 2016, the Suretone label returned with distribution through the Alternative Distribution Alliance.

== Artists ==
- Angels & Airwaves
- The Black Angels
- Collective Soul
- Chris Cornell
- The Cure
- Ded
- Drop Dead, Gorgeous
- Eastern Conference Champions
- From First to Last
- Goodbye June
- Headway
- Limp Bizkit
- Manic
- Meriwether
- New Found Glory
- The Pink Spiders
- Ryan Adams
- Santana
- Sarah Davidson
- Sayyi
- Shwayze
- Twin Limb
- ZZ Top
