= Last drop =

Last drop is often an allusion to the proverb "The last drop makes the cup run over". It may also refer to:

- The Last Drop (Leyster), a 1639 painting by Judith Leyster
- The Last Drop of Water, a 1911 American film by D.W. Griffth
- "Last Drop", a 2004 song by Kevin Lyttle
- The Last Drop, a 2006 British-Romanian WWII film by Colin Teague
- Every Last Drop, a 2008 horror novel by Charlie Huston in the Joe Pitt series
- Last Drop (film), Last Drop is a 2020 Indian 1-minute short film
- Last Drop (video game), an upcoming Finnish video game

== See also ==
- Seneca's phrase "It is not the last drop that empties the water-clock, but all that which previously has flowed out"
- Final straw (disambiguation)
