= Kevin Lyttle (album) =

Studio album by Kevin Lyttle
- Released: 27 July 2004
- Recorded: 2003–2004
- Genres: Soca; dancehall
- Label: Atlantic
- Producers: Salaam Remi; Nicholas Brancker; Adrian Bailey; Cherry Ince; Scott Storch; Troyton Rami; Troy Taylor; Andreas S. Jensen; Da Bhann; Anastas Hackett; Jeremy Harding

Kevin Lyttle chronology
Kevin Lyttle (2004)	Fyah (2008)

Singles from Kevin Lyttle
- 1. "Turn Me On" Released: 13 October 2003; 2. "Last Drop" Released: 2004

Kevin Lyttle is the debut studio album by Vincentian singer Kevin Lyttle. The album was released in 2004 and included the hit "Turn Me On", which went to top 5 in many countries worldwide.

== Album information ==
The album was produced by a team of various producers, including Salaam Remi and Troy Taylor. It includes Lyttle's biggest hit "Turn Me On" and the second single "Last Drop", both recorded with contribution from Jamaica dancehall artist Spragga Benz, and the cover version of "Sign Your Name" by Terence Trent D'Arby. On some US releases, the song "So High" is replaced with "Dance with Me", featuring Trey Songz, who also delivers guest vocals in "Call Me".

The album entered the Billboard albums chart at number 8, selling 84,000 copies, and would eventually be certified gold. As of January 2009, it has sold 375,000 copies in the US. The album also charted within top 10 of Swiss albums chart and reached number 12 in Japan, but was met with only modest success elsewhere.

== Singles ==
"Turn Me On" was released as the first single in 2003, meeting with a worldwide success at the turn of 2003 and 2004 and placing within top 10 in no less than fifteen countries, including number 1 in Denmark. "Last Drop" followed as the second single in 2004 and although did not repeat the success of "Turn Me On", it still was a top 40 hit in Australia and a number of European countries. "I Got It" was planned as next single, supported by a big promotion, however, "Drive Me Crazy" was released instead in October 2004, with "I Got It" following in January 2005. None of the two latter singles charted.

== Critical reception ==
Professional ratings
Review scores
Source	Rating
AllMusic	3/5 stars
Billboard	Favorable
The Boston Globe	Favorable
The Daily Telegraph	Favorable
Entertainment Weekly	C
The Guardian	3/5 stars
The New York Times	Mixed

Kevin Lyttle received mixed to favorable reviews. Ken Capobianco of The Boston Globe described the album as "a sharply melodic and consistently engaging set of songs...a buoyant mix of soca, dancehall, modern reggae, and American R&B and soul". Tom Horan of The Daily Telegraph described the album as "beautifully judged," comparing Lyttle's voice to Marvin Gaye. AllMusic writer David Jeffries rated the album three stars out of five, stating "Lyttle's breezy and dreamy voice supplies the flair, lilting lightly over a musical background that is as sparkling as it is limited".

The New York Times music critic Kelefa Sanneh described it as "a lightweight but appealing collection of dance tracks, with precise digital beats that sound oddly similar to some European pop" while conceding: "...the songwriting isn't always very interesting, and Mr. Lyttle's voice sometimes seems less expressive than the computers that filter it." Grading the album with a "C" for Entertainment Weekly, Neil Drumming characterized Lyttle's singing as a "weak, whiny wavelength that, at its very best moment ('So High'), mocks Al Green's vulnerable texture."

== Track listing ==
No.	Title	Writer(s)	Producer(s)	Length
1.	"Turn Me On"	Arnold Hennings; Daron Tavaris Jones; Michael Keith; Quinnes Parker; Marvin Scandrick; Courtney Douglas Sills; Kevin Lyttle; Raeon Primus	Adrian Bailey; Jeremy Wheatley (add.)	3:14
2.	"Last Drop" (featuring Spragga Benz)	Godfrey "Cherry" Ince; Lyttle; Carlton Grant	Cherry Ince; Salaam Remi (add.); Nicholas Brancker (add.); Ryan Toby (voc.)	3:20
3.	"Never Wanna Make U Cry"	Ince; Lyttle	Cherry Ince; Craig Derry (voc.)	3:36
4.	"If You Want Me (Call Me)"	Adrian Bailey; Troy Taylor; Tremaine Neverson	Adrian Bailey; Troy Taylor (voc.); Trey Songz (voc.)	3:46
5.	"I Got It"	Bernard Edwards; Nile Rodgers; Salaam Remi; Nicholas Brancker; Lyttle	Salaam Remi; Nicholas Brancker; Craig Derry (voc.)	3:30
6.	"Sign Your Name"	Terence Trent D'Arby	Scott Storch; Craig Derry (voc.)	4:24
7.	"Screaming Out My Name" (featuring Assassin)	Troyton Rami; Lyttle; Jeffrey Campbell	Troyton Rami	3:14
8.	"My Lady"	Remi; Lyttle; Ryan Toby	Salaam Remi; Ryan Toby (voc.)	3:32
9.	"Ya Kiss"	Taylor; Neverson; Ezekiel Lewis; Brandon Howard	Troy Taylor	3:32
10.	"So High"	Andreas S. Jensen; Delroy Blake	Andreas S. Jensen; Troy Taylor (voc.); Trey Songz (voc.)	3:25
11.	"Dancing Like Making Love"	Remi; Lyttle; Brancker	Salaam Remi; Nicholas Brancker; Ryan Toby (voc.)	3:12
12.	"My Love"	Lyttle; Craig Christopher; Winston Riley	Da Bhann; Salaam Remi (add.)	3:45
13.	"Mama Mia" (featuring Spragga Benz)	Anastas Hackett; Lyttle; Grant	Anastas "Nas/T" Hackett; Ryan Toby (voc.)	4:23
14.	"Turn Me On" (remix; featuring Spragga Benz)	Hennings; Jones; Keith; Parker; Scandrick; Sills; Lyttle; Grant	Jeremy Harding	3:22

Alternate edition
No.	Title	Writer(s)	Producer(s)	Length
1.	"Turn Me On"	Hennings; Jones; Keith; Parker; Scandrick; Sills; Lyttle; Primus	Adrian Bailey; Jeremy Wheatley (add.)	3:14
2.	"Last Drop" (featuring Spragga Benz)	Ince; Lyttle; Grant	Cherry Ince; Salaam Remi (add.); Nicholas Brancker (add.); Ryan Toby (voc.)	3:20
3.	"Never Wanna Make U Cry"	Ince; Lyttle	Cherry Ince; Craig Derry (voc.)	3:36
4.	"Call Me"	Bailey; Taylor; Neverson	Adrian Bailey; Troy Taylor (voc.); Trey Songz (voc.)	3:45
5.	"I Got It" (featuring Spragga Benz)	Edwards; Rodgers; Remi; Brancker; Lyttle	Salaam Remi; Nicholas Brancker; Craig Derry (voc.)	3:39
6.	"Sign Your Name"	D'Arby	Scott Storch; Craig Derry (voc.)	4:23
7.	"Screaming Out My Name" (featuring Assassin)	Rami; Lyttle; Campbell	Troyton Rami	3:14
8.	"My Lady"	Remi; Lyttle; Toby	Salaam Remi; Ryan Toby (voc.)	3:32
9.	"Ya Kiss"	Taylor; Neverson; Lewis; Howard	Troy Taylor	3:32
10.	"Dance with Me" (featuring Trey Songz)	Bailey; Lyttle; Taylor; Neverson	Adrian Bailey; Troy Taylor (co.)(voc.); Trey Songz (voc.)	3:31
11.	"Dancing Like Making Love"	Remi; Lyttle; Brancker	Salaam Remi; Nicholas Brancker; Ryan Toby (voc.)	3:12
12.	"My Love"	Lyttle; Christopher; Riley	Da Bhann; Salaam Remi (add.)	3:45
13.	"Drive Me Crazy" (featuring Mr. Easy)	Tony Kelly; Ian Dyer	Tony "CD" Kelly	3:48
14.	"Mama Mia" (featuring Spragga Benz)	Hackett; Lyttle; Grant	Anastas "Nas/T" Hackett; Ryan Toby (voc.)	4:23
15.	"Turn Me On" (remix; featuring Spragga Benz)	Hennings; Jones; Keith; Parker; Scandrick; Sills; Lyttle; Grant	Jeremy Harding	3:22

Sample credits

- "Turn Me On" embodies portions of "All My Love", written by Arnold Hennings, Daron Tavaris Jones, Michael Keith, Quinnes Parker, Marvin Scandrick, and Courtney Douglas Sills.
- "I Got It" contains interpolations of the composition "Upside Down", written by Bernard Edwards and Nile Rodgers.

== Charts and certifications ==
=== Charts ===
Chart performance for Kevin Lyttle
Chart (2004)	Peak position
Australian Albums (ARIA)	100
Austrian Albums (Ö3 Austria)	68
Dutch Albums (Album Top 100)	39
French Albums (SNEP)	105
German Albums (Offizielle Top 100)	42
Italian Albums (FIMI)	48
Japanese Albums (Oricon)	12
Norwegian Albums (VG-lista)	33
Portuguese Albums (AFP)	24
Swiss Albums (Schweizer Hitparade)	10
UK Albums (Official Charts)	86
US Billboard 200	8
US Reggae Albums (Billboard)	1
US Top R&B/Hip-Hop Albums (Billboard)	8

=== Certifications ===
Certifications for Kevin Lyttle
Region	Certification	Certified units/sales
Japan (RIAJ)	Platinum	250,000^{^}
United States (RIAA)	Gold	500,000^{^}
^{^} Shipments figures based on certification alone.
