= Last Drop =

Single by Kevin Lyttle

from the album Kevin Lyttle
- Released: 2004
- Genre: Soca
- Length: 3:21
- Label: Atlantic
- Songwriters: Carlton Grant, Cherry Ince, Kevin Lyttle
- Producers: Cherry Ince, Salaam Remi, Nicholas Brancker

Kevin Lyttle singles chronology
"Turn Me On" (2003)	"Last Drop" (2004)	"Drive Me Crazy" (2004)

"Last Drop" is a song by Vincentian singer Kevin Lyttle, released in 2004 as the second single from his self-titled debut album. The follow-up to Lyttle's highly popular international debut single "Turn Me On", "Last Drop" was met with modest chart success.

== Track listings ==
CD single

1. "Last Drop" (featuring Spragga Benz) – 3:28
2. "Drive Me Crazy" (featuring Mr. Easy) (non-album track) – 3:32

CD maxi

1. "Last Drop" (featuring Spragga Benz) – 3:28
2. "I Like" (non-album track) – 3:48
3. "Drive Me Crazy" (featuring Mr. Easy) (non-album track) – 3:32
4. "Last Drop" (video enhancement)

== Charts ==
Chart (2004)	Peak position
Australia (ARIA)	39
Belgium (Ultratop 50 Flanders)	37
Belgium (Ultratip Bubbling Under Wallonia)	12
Finland (Suomen virallinen lista)	10
Germany (GfK)	58
Italy (FIMI)	22
Netherlands (Dutch Top 40 Tipparade)	2
Netherlands (Single Top 100)	23
Sweden (Sverigetopplistan)	36
Switzerland (Schweizer Hitparade)	20
Scotland Singles (OCC)	48
UK Singles (OCC)	22
