= I Feel Everything (album) =

Studio album by Maggie Lindemann
- Released: October 17, 2025
- Length: 46:51
- Label: Swixxzaudio
- Producers: Captain Cuts, Cody Tarpley, Erik Ron, Josh Murty, Kill Dave, Scro, Zach Jones

Maggie Lindemann chronology
| Headsplit (2024) | I Feel Everything (2025) |

Singles from I Feel Everything
- 1. "One of the Ones" Released: July 25, 2025; 2. "Spine" Released: August 22, 2025; 3. "2022" Released: September 26, 2025

I Feel Everything is the second studio album by American singer Maggie Lindemann, released on October 17, 2025, via her own label Swixxzaudio. It was supported by three singles, "One of the Ones", "Spine", and "2022" featuring Julia Wolf.

== Background and release ==
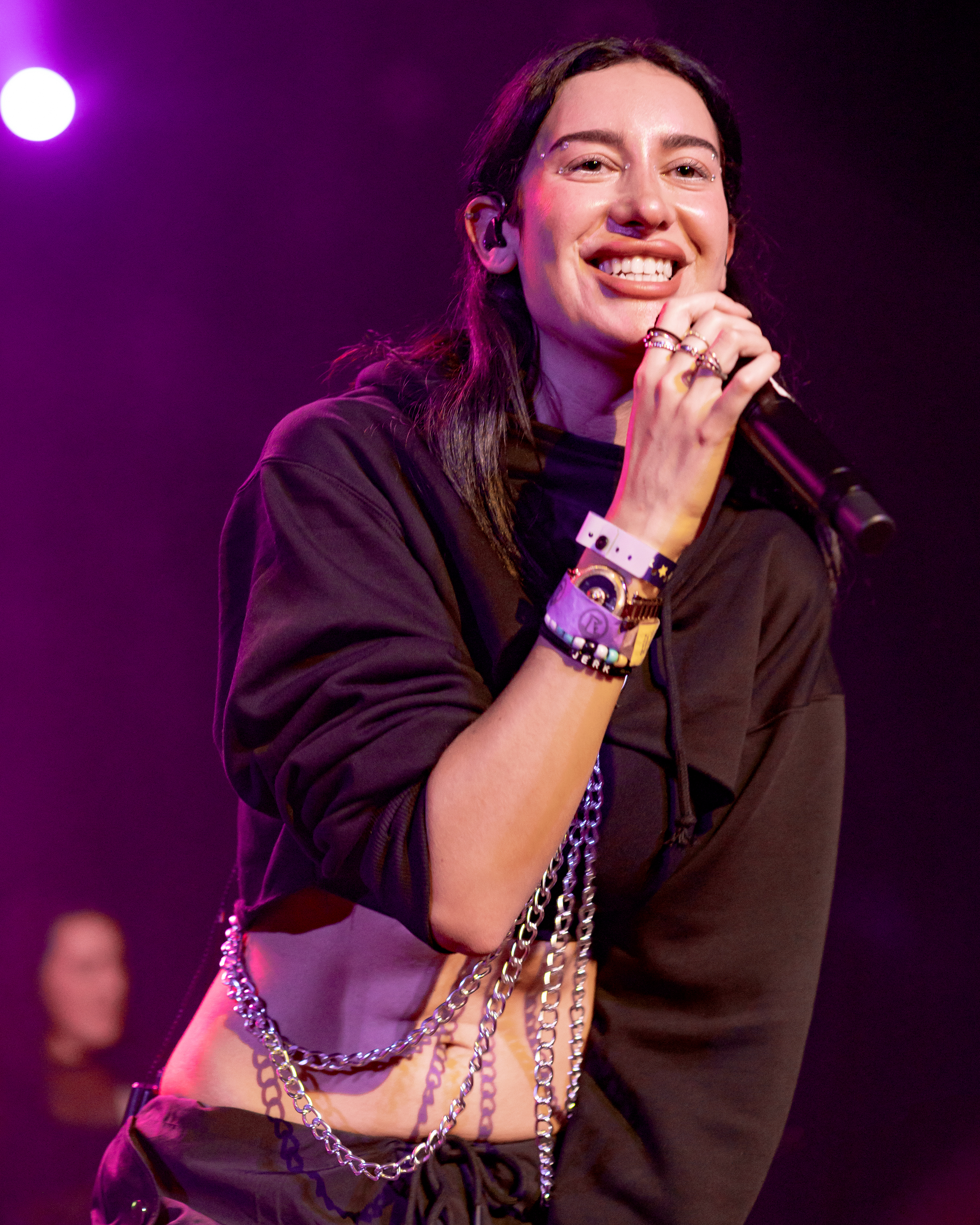
Julia Wolf (pictured) featured on the track "2022".

Following 2022 album Suckerpunch and 2024 EP Headsplit, Lindemann announced her sophomore album, I Feel Everything, which was set to be released on October 17. In an interview with People, Lindemann explained that the title reflects a period in which she felt emotionally overwhelmed. She said, "I just feel everything. I'm feeling so much", adding that she experienced "a lot of highs, lows, confusion, sadness, happiness, pain, all of it", and described herself as "literally feeling everything".

== Release and promotion ==
Alongside the album's announcement, Lindemann revealed its tracklist, featuring collaborations with Julia Wolf, Max Fry, and the Warning. To give listeners a preview of the album's sound, she released the lead single "One of the Ones", followed by her next single "Spine", released on the same day as the album was announced. "2022", featuring Wolf, was released on September 26, 2025. In 2026, Lindemann announced the I Feel Everything Tour, in support of the album.

== Composition ==
I Feel Everything showcases Lindemann's exploration of emotional honesty. It addressese themes such as leaving a volatile partner in "Split" and the thrill of a chaotic relationship in "Joyride". The album incorporates an updated pop-rock sound that reinforces the record's energetic yet introspective tone.

=== Songs ===
"Spine" is written as a letter to someone lacking courage, following Lindemann's earlier single "One of the Ones". The alt-pop track, which blends dark pop rock, the song criticizes weakness and repeated behaviors through sharp lyrics and vocals. "2022" explores themes of self-worth and abandonment, which Lindemann described as "a turning point" when things began to unravel. Featuring Julia Wolf, it blends ache and growth through heartfelt vocals.

== Critical reception ==
Professional ratings
Review scores
| Source | Rating |
|---|---|
| New Noise Magazine | 4/5 stars |

Kayla Moreno from New Noise Magazine praised I Feel Everything for its confident blend of hyperpop and alternative elements, noting Lindemann's artistic growth and emotionally resonant collaborations. Allyson Franzo of Melodic Magazine praised the album for its raw, emotional depth, blending vulnerable tracks like "Mourning" with punk-inspired anthems like "Let Me Burn".

== Track listing ==
I Feel Everything track listing
| No. | Title | Length |
|---|---|---|
| 1. | "Fang" | 3:10 |
| 2. | "Spine" | 2:27 |
| 3. | "Mourning" | 3:42 |
| 4. | "Joyride" | 2:19 |
| 5. | "Suburbs" | 2:42 |
| 6. | "Let Me Burn" (featuring The Warning) | 3:51 |
| 7. | "I Don't Belong Here" | 3:36 |
| 8. | "Evil" | 2:47 |
| 9. | "Lost Cause" | 2:37 |
| 10. | "2022" (featuring Julia Wolf) | 2:55 |
| 11. | "Fate" | 2:11 |
| 12. | "Heart Drop" | 3:15 |
| 13. | "Split" | 3:11 |
| 14. | "One of the Ones" | 2:06 |
| 15. | "It's Still You" (featuring Max Fry) | 3:08 |
| 16. | "I Feel Everything" | 2:54 |
| Total length: | | 46:51 |
