= Cade (musician) =

American singer & producer (born 1996)

CADE
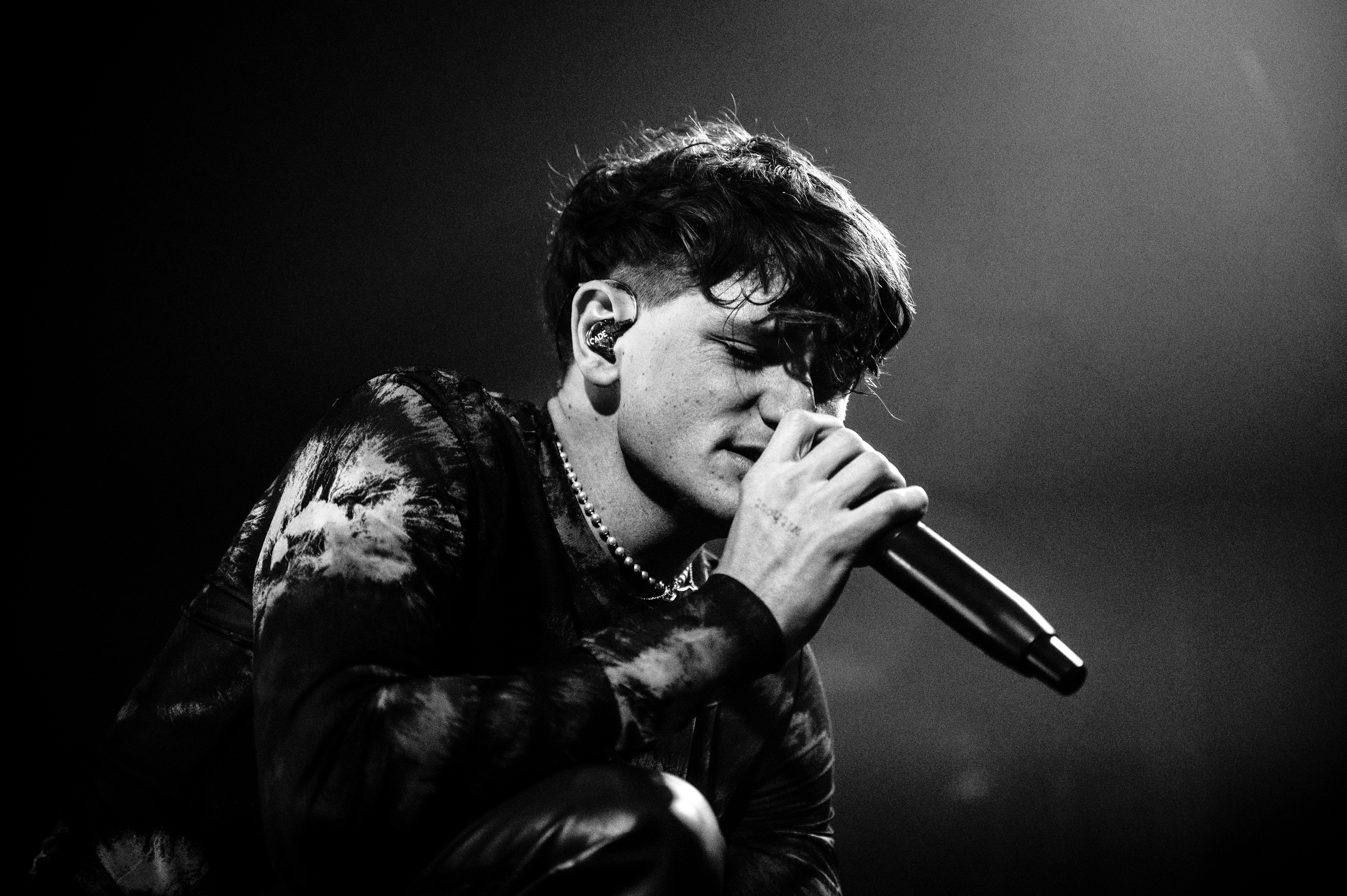

Background information
- Born: Cade Larson; September 26, 1996 (age 29); Savannah, Georgia, United States
- Genres: Electronic; R&B
- Occupations: Musician; singer; songwriter; record producer
- Years active: 2016–present
- Labels: Ultra; Spinnin'; Armada

Cade Cameron Larson (born September 26 1996), better known by his stage name as Cade (stylized as CADE), is an American musician, singer, songwriter and record producer. He has released three EPs.

== Early life ==
Cade Cameron Larson was born on September 26, 1996, in Savannah, Georgia, and moved to Tampa, Florida, as a child. Cade's earliest music memories were music videos of Lou Bega and Shania Twain and watching his mother sing in church. CADE started playing guitar at the age of eight, and performed for the first time at his elementary school talent show in fourth grade. CADE performed Crazy Train by Ozzy Osbourne on guitar, with his older brother playing the drums for him. At 13, CADE started writing his own songs, and was taught how to record himself by an older friend who was a member of his middle school garage band.

== Career ==
=== 2014–2016: Career beginnings ===
CADE began writing and recording his own music while living in his parents' home in Tampa, Florida, and attending H.B. Plant High School. At the age of 16, CADE, who was the president of his Junior Class, left Plant High School and switched to virtual school to focus more time on his music career. During this time, he wrote and recorded a demo that would later become 'Stay With You'. In 2016, CADE moved to Los Angeles, California, where he would live with two of his friends who had just started the DJ-trio Cheat Codes.

=== 2016–2018: Care EP, Pretty Girl & Stay With You ===
CADE launched his solo endeavors with his EP, 'Care', which was released in July 2016 via Spinnin' Records. His debut single, 'Care' premiered exclusively on Billboard, where CADE says that he feels his sound "mixes the emotion of R&B music with the dynamic elements of electronic dance music". "Care" was produced by Cheat Codes' Trevor Dahl, who befriended Larson on a tour in 2015. "Care" quickly turned the heads of and garnered support from the likes of The Chainsmokers, Louis The Child, Chloe Grace Moretz, Pia Mia, and more.

Following the EP, CADE collaborated with electronic artist Mokita on their song 'Monopoly', which was released by Armada. They shot a music video for the song in Amsterdam.

On February 17, 2017, CADE released 'Sorry For Myself' with Spinnin' Records. Cade wrote the single alongside Michael Pollack (musician), Lauv, Trevor Dahl, and Phil Good, and the song was produced by Dutch-DJ, R3hab. The music video has over a million views on YouTube.

In March 2017, CADE collaborated on production with pop trio, Cheat Codes, to remix Maggie Lindemann’s "Pretty Girl", which resulted in over 800 million streams on Spotify. The song achieved Platinum RIAA certification in the US and 2× Platinum BPI certification in the UK.

CADE was given an opportunity to open for some well-known artists on tour, including Ke$ha, Jeremih, and Juicy J.

Later in the year, CADE was playing some of his old demos for his roommate, Trevor Dahl. Trevor heard the demo of 'Stay With You' and asked CADE if he would be interested in making the song a collaboration with Cheat Codes. Their collaboration, "Stay with You", peaked at #35 on the US Hot Dance/Electronic Songs Chart.

=== 2018–19: Signing to Ultra Records & WOLF BLUE. ===
On June 23, 2018, CADE signed his first exclusive record deal with Ultra Records / Sony. Cade's first release with the label was 'Strip Club' featuring Lil Aaron.

CADE was at Ultra Records' studio in Los Angeles working in a session with producer, Gazzo, when he started writing a topline vocal for a beat that Gazzo had shown to Desiigner. The Panda-rapper met them at the studio where they would finish the collaboration to be called "Home to You" featuring Desiigner.

CADE released two additional solo singles, "Yours" and "Better Off Alone". Simultaneously, CADE was performing overseas at festivals including We The Fest in Jakarta, Indonesia, and Ultra Europe alongside Cheat Codes.

On November 15, 2019, CADE released his first EP with Ultra Records, titled WOLF BLUE. The project was inspired by a trip CADE took to the forest and focused on his "spirit-animal", the wolf. The EP included his previous singles, as well as two additional songs, "Too Much" and "Crazy".

=== 2020–2021: Down, Kill Me Softly, & Who Set Us On Fire ===
On August 14, 2020, Indonesian-DJ Dipha Barus and CADE released a collaboration titled 'Down'. The song went on to win an AMI award in Indonesia for Best Male / Solo Artist / Group Dance Collaboration. While the two artists were located on opposite sides of the world during a global pandemic, the duo managed to shoot a green-screen music video for the record that where the artists appear to be performing in outer space.

CADE then went on to release two additional solo-singles, trap-infused 'Kill Me Softly' and rock-inspired 'Who Set Us On Fire' with Ultra Records.

=== 2021–present: Watching You Cry ===
In December 2021, CADE started releasing the first three singles off of his forthcoming EP, Watching You Cry (which will be released via Ultra Records on September 16, 2022). The singles included '20 Missed Calls (featuring Nate Traveller)', 'Problem$', and '1942'.

CADE’s next project, 'Watching You Cry' will be a 7-song album "inspired by heartache, passion, love, self-discovery and personal growth".

== Discography ==
=== Extended plays ===
Title	Album details
Care	Released: July 22, 2016; Format: Digital download; Label: Source (Spinnin' Records)
Warning Sign	Released: April 20, 2018; Format: Digital download; Label: Spinnin' Records
WOLF BLUE.	Released: November 15, 2019; Format: Digital download; Label: Ultra Records

=== Charted singles ===
Title	Year	Peak chart positions	Album
Title	Year	US Dance	Album
"Stay with You" (with Cheat Codes)	2017	35	Non-album single

=== Other singles ===
2016

- Care (SOURCE)
- Make You Feel Loved (SOURCE)
- Monopoly (with Mokita) (Armada Trice)
- Let Me Love You (Dastic featuring CADE) (Spinnin' Records)

2017

- Can't Take It (Breathe Carolina and Bassjackers featuring CADE) (Spinnin' Records)
- Sorry for Myself (Spinnin' Records)
- Give It to You (Niko the Kid and Bee's Knees featuring CADE) (Armada Trice)
- Done with You (Boehm featuring Cade) (Armada Deep)
- Stay with You (with Cheat Codes) (300 Entertainment)
- Where We Left (SOURCE)
- I Know You Know (featuring TK Kravitz) (CADE Music)
- Thinkin' Bout Myself (with CMC$) (Stmpd Rcrds)

2018

- Warning Sign (Spinnin' Records)
- Strip Club (featuring Lil Aaron) (Ultra Records)

2019

- Home To You (featuring Desiigner) (Ultra Records)
- Yours (Ultra Records)
- Better Off Alone (Ultra Records)

2020

- Down (Dipha Barus featuring CADE) (Ultra Records)
- Kill Me Softly (Ultra Records)

2021

- Who Set Us On Fire (Ultra Records)
- 20 Missed Calls (featuring Nate Traveller) (Ultra Records)

2022

- Problem$ (Ultra Records)
- 1942 (Ultra Records)
