= Final straw =

Final straw is an allusion to the proverb "It is the last straw that breaks the camel's back".

It may also refer to:

- Final Straw, a 2003 album by the rock band Snow Patrol
  - Final Straw Tour, a concert tour in 2003–2005 by Snow Patrol
- Final Straw: Food, Earth, Happiness, a 2015 film
- The Final Straw (TV series), a 2022 American game show

== See also ==
- Last drop (disambiguation)
