= Caringi =

Caringi is an Italian surname. Notable people with the surname include:

- Pete Caringi Jr. (born 1955), American soccer coach
- Pete Caringi III (born 1992), American soccer player
- Tania Marie Caringi (1986–2025), Italian-American model
