= One Last Time =

One Last Time may refer to:

== Songs ==
- "One Last Time" (Agnes song), 2012
- "One Last Time" (Ariana Grande song), 2014
- "One Last Time" (Dusty Drake song), 2003
- "One Last Time" (Hamilton song), from Hamilton: An American Musical, 2015
- "(Let's Get Together) One Last Time", by Tammy Wynette, 1977
- "All of Me" (John Legend song), briefly retitled "One Last Time", 2013
- "One Last Time", by Arch Enemy from Deceivers
- "One Last Time", by Arjun
- "One Last Time", by Bonnie Pink from One
- "One Last Time", by Dream Theater from Metropolis Pt. 2: Scenes from a Memory
- "One Last Time", by Edie Brickell & New Bohemians from Stranger Things
- "One Last Time", by Elise Estrada from Elise Estrada
- "One Last Time", by Girls' Generation from Holiday Night
- "One Last Time", by Glen Campbell from Glen Travis Campbell
- "One Last Time", by Gromee
- "One Last Time", by HIM from Razorblade Romance
- "One Last Time", by K-Ci & JoJo from X
- "One Last Time", by Kellie Pickler from Kellie Pickler
- "One Last Time", by Maggie Lindemann from Headsplit
- "One Last Time", by Mumzy Stranger and Stevie Hoang
- "One Last Time", by The Plot in You from Dispose
- "One Last Time", by Simon Webbe from Smile
- "One Last Time", by Westlife from Spectrum
- "One Last Time", by Alesso and DubVision

== Television episodes ==
- "One Last Time" (Good Girls), 2019
- "One Last Thing" (Homeland) or "One Last Time", 2013

== See also ==
- One Last Time Live in Concert, a 2001 documentary featuring Tina Turner
- Live – One Last Time, a 2007 album by The Clark Sisters
- "Just One Last Time", a song by David Guetta
- One Last Time: An Evening with Tony Bennett and Lady Gaga, a 2021 television special
