= Cheat Codes (DJs) =

American pop rock band

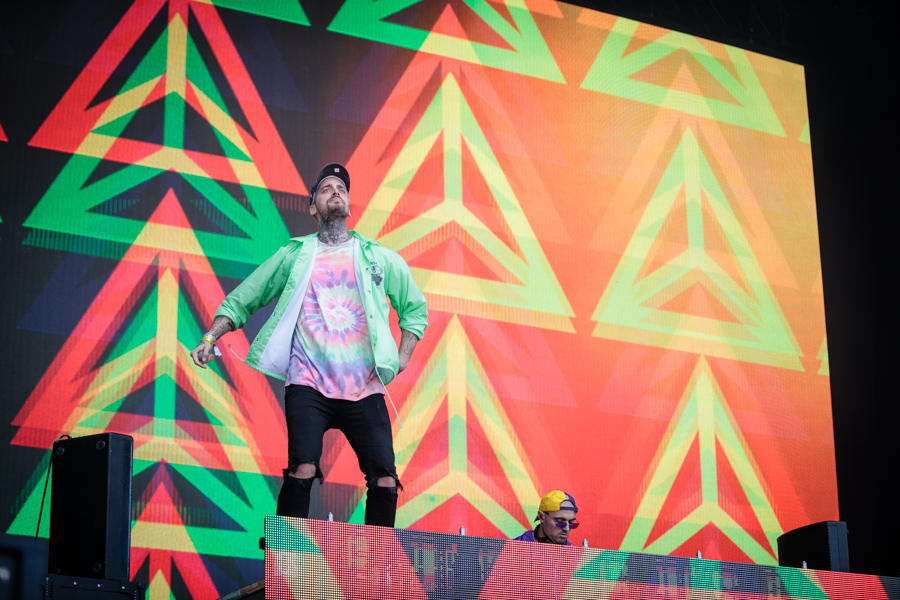
- Cheat Codes performing live in Stavernfestivalen in 2018

Background information
- Origin: Los Angeles, California, United States
- Genres: EDM; pop
- Years active: 2014–present
- Labels: 300; Spinnin'; Parlophone; Warner; Atlantic
- Members: KEVI (Kevin Pederson / Kevin Ford / Prince$$ Rosie); Trevor Dahl; Matthew Russell
- Website: cheatcodesmusic.com

Cheat Codes is an American electronic music DJ trio from Los Angeles, California. The group—consisting of KEVI (Kevin Ford / Prince$$ Rosie), Trevor Dahl, and Matthew Russell—is notable for their 2016 single "Sex", which samples the chorus from "Let's Talk About Sex" by Salt-N-Pepa, and their 2017 single "No Promises", which featured American singer Demi Lovato and peaked within the Top 40 of the US, UK and Australia. The track was certified Platinum by the RIAA.

== History ==
=== 2014–2015: Formation and debut singles ===
Prior to the 2014 formation of the band, Trevor and Matthew lived together and later wrote and recorded music with Kevin. Their name was inspired by Kevin's brother who told him that he had found the "cheat code" to getting anything he wanted in life. "We really embody the idea that anything is possible. To us, the real 'cheat code' to life is loving what you do and we hope to convey that energy through our music," they said in an interview.

In 2015, they released their debut single titled "Visions", which reached number 1 on the Hype Machine chart. It was followed by the singles "Don't Say No", "Senses", and "Adventure". "Adventure" reached number 3 on the Hype Machine chart. The group gained over 15 million views on YouTube and later toured with The Chainsmokers.

=== 2016–present: Other singles, first EPs and Hellraisers ===
In July 2016, they released "Let Me Hold You (Turn Me On)" with Dante Klein, which samples Kevin Lyttle's song "Turn Me On". The song has since gained over 100 million streams.

Before "Let Me Hold You (Turn Me On)" was released, in February 2016, they released "Sex" with Kris Kross Amsterdam, quickly gaining over 300 million streams. Talking about "Sex", band member Matthew admitted that the song was affected by divine intervention as it only took 45 minutes to write. In August 2016, a music video was released for the song, and the band performed at the Billboard Hot 100 festival.

They signed to 300 Entertainment in September 2016. In November, they released "Queen Elizabeth", co-produced by "Foreign Noi$e". They released "No Promises", a collaboration with Demi Lovato, in March 2017. In May 2017, the single "Stay With You" was released. The single "Sober" was released in July 2017. The group released "Feels Great", a collaboration with Fetty Wap and CVBZ, on October 13, 2017.

The group released the single "Put Me Back Together" with Kiiara on March 2, 2018. Cheat Codes collaborated with U2 and released a remixed version of U2's single "Love Is Bigger Than Anything in Its Way" on May 29, 2018.

In June 2018, they released their extended play, Level 1 consisting of 6 songs, include "I Love It" and "Balenciaga". On June 22, 2018, Cheat Codes released "Only You" with Little Mix as a part of the compilation album Love Island: The Pool Party, which was released on July 6, 2018, by Ministry of Sound. They released the song "Feeling of Falling" with Kim Petras on November 30, 2018. On July 26, 2019, they released their second extended play, Level 2.

On June 26, 2020, the group released the single "Heaven". The music video was released the following month. In August, they released "No Time" featuring Wiz Khalifa and DVBBS. On September 2, 2020, they announced their upcoming three-part debut studio album Hellraisers and released the lead single "Between Our Hearts" featuring Australian singer Cxloe. On November 4, they released the single "Washed Up".

== Members ==
Current members

- KEVI (Kevin Ford / Prince$$ Rosie) – lead and backing vocals, guitars, bass, keyboards, synthesizer, tambourine, drums, percussion, DJ, production, programming, mixing, mastering (2014–present)
- Trevor Dahl – lead and backing vocals, guitar, bass, synthesizer, keyboards, drums, percussion, DJ, production, programming, mixing, mastering (2014–present)
- Matthew Russell – lead and backing vocals, bass guitar, keyboards, synthesizer, violin, drums, percussion, DJ, production, programming, mixing, mastering (2014–present)

Current touring musicians

- Morgan Paros – lead and backing vocals, guitar, keyboards, electric violin, violin (2017–present)
- Mark Evitts – violin, fiddle, viola, mandolin, guitar, piano, banjo, tenor guitar (2017–present)
- Kyle Jordan Mueller – drums, percussion (2017–present)
- Saša Maček – drums, percussion (2019–present)

== Discography ==
=== Studio albums ===
Title	Details
Hellraisers, Pt. 1	Released: May 7, 2021; Label: 300 Entertainment; Formats: Digital download, streaming
Hellraisers, Pt. 2	Released: October 15, 2021; Label: 300 Entertainment; Formats: Digital download, streaming
Hellraisers, Pt. 3	Released: May 27, 2022; Label: 300 Entertainment; Formats: Digital download, streaming
One Night in Nashville	Released: January 27, 2023; Label: DashGo; Formats: Digital download, streaming
Future Renaissance	Released: July 25, 2025; Label: Create Music; Formats: Digital download, streaming

=== Extended plays ===
Title	Details
Level 1	Released: June 8, 2018; Label: 300 Entertainment; Formats: Digital download, streaming
Level 2	Released: July 26, 2019; Label: 300 Entertainment; Formats: Digital download, streaming
Find Love Now	Released: August 2, 2024; Label: Create Music; Formats: Digital download, streaming
Bloom	Released: August 23, 2024; Label: Create Music; Formats: Digital download, streaming
Modern Tragedy	Released: September 13, 2024; Label: Create Music; Formats: Digital download, streaming
TYSM	Released: November 21, 2024; Label: Create Music; Formats: Digital download, streaming
Don't Leave	Released: April 25, 2025; Label: Create Music; Formats: Digital download, streaming
More Than Anybody	Released: May 23, 2025; Label: Create Music; Formats: Digital download, streaming

=== Singles ===
==== As lead artist ====
List of singles, with selected chart positions and certifications
Title	Year	Peak chart positions											Certifications	Album
Title	Year	US	US Dance	AUS	BEL (FL)	DEN	GER	NLD	NOR	NZ Hot	SWE	UK	Certifications	Album
"Visions"	2015	—	—	—	—	—	—	—	—	—	—	—		Non-album singles
"Adventure" (with Evan Gartner)	2015	—	—	—	—	—	—	—	—	—	—	—		Non-album singles
"Senses" (featuring Lostboycrow)	2015	—	—	—	—	—	—	—	—	—	—	—		Non-album singles
"Follow You"	2015	—	—	—	—	—	—	—	—	—	—	—		Non-album singles
"Please Don't Go" (with Dresses)	2015	—	—	—	—	—	—	—	—	—	—	—		Non-album singles
"Say Goodbye"	2016	—	—	—	—	—	—	—	—	—	—	—		Non-album singles
"Sex" (with Kris Kross Amsterdam)	2016	— (Note: "Sex" did not chart on the Billboard Hot 100, but peaked at number 15 on the Bubbling Under Hot 100 Singles chart.)	10	17	25	3	14	2	2	—	2	9	RIAA: Gold; ARIA: 2× Platinum; BEA: Gold; BPI: Platinum; BVMI: 3× Gold; GLF: 4× Platinum; IFPI DEN: 2× Platinum; IFPI NOR: 3× Platinum	Non-album singles
"Runaway"	2016	—	—	—	—	—	—	—	—	—	—	—		Non-album singles
"Fed Up" (with Lvndscape)	2016	—	—	—	—	—	—	—	—	—	—	—		Non-album singles
"Can't Fight It" (with Quintino)	2016	—	48	—	—	—	—	—	—	—	—	—		Non-album singles
"Let Me Hold You (Turn Me On)" (with Dante Klein)	2016	—	14	38	55	19	49	27	15	—	12	36	ARIA: Platinum; BPI: Gold; BVMI: Gold; GLF: 2× Platinum; IFPI DEN: Platinum; IFPI NOR: Platinum	Non-album singles
"Queen Elizabeth"	2016	—	49	—	—	—	—	—	—	—	—	—		Non-album singles
"No Promises" (featuring Demi Lovato)	2017	38	2	17	37	30	44	35	39	—	37	18	RIAA: Platinum; ARIA: 3× Platinum; BEA: Gold; BPI: Platinum; BVMI: Gold; IFPI DEN: Platinum; IFPI NOR: 2× Platinum	Non-album singles
"Stay with You" (with Cade)	2017	—	35	—	—	—	—	—	—	—	—	—		Non-album singles
"Sober" (with Nicky Romero)	2017	—	41	—	—	—	—	—	—	—	—	—		Non-album singles
"Feels Great" (featuring Fetty Wap and CVBZ)	2017	—	9	39	—	—	—	—	—	—	99	—	RIAA: Gold; ARIA: Platinum	Non-album singles
"Put Me Back Together" (featuring Kiiara)	2018	—	—	—	—	—	—	—	—	—	— (Note: "Put Me Back Together" did not enter the Swedish Singellista Chart, but peaked at number 14 on the Swedish Heatseeker Chart.)	—		Non-album singles
"NSFW" (with Danny Quest)	2018	—	—	—	—	—	—	—	—	—	—	—		Level 1
"Balenciaga"	2018	—	41	—	—	—	—	—	—	—	—	—		Level 1
"I Love It" (with Dvbbs)	2018	—	40	—	—	—	—	—	—	—	—	—		Level 1
"Only You" (with Little Mix)	2018	—	15	92	85	—	—	—	—	—	89	13	BPI: Platinum	LM5 (Deluxe Edition)
"Home"	2018	—	38	—	—	—	—	—	—	39	—	—		Non-album singles
"Feeling of Falling" (with Kim Petras)	2018	—	23	—	—	—	—	—	—	—	—	—		Non-album singles
"Ferrari" (featuring Afrojack)	2019	—	—	—	—	—	—	—	—	—	—	—		Level 2
"Who's Got Your Love" (with Daniel Blume)	2019	—	25	—	—	—	—	—	—	17	—	—		Level 2
"Be the One" (with Kaskade)	2019	—	—	—	—	—	—	—	—	—	—	—		Level 2
"I Feel Ya" (with Danny Quest and Ina Wroldsen)	2019	—	—	—	—	—	—	—	—	—	—	—		Level 2
"All of My Life" (with Trixxie)	2019	—	—	—	—	—	—	—	—	—	—	—		Level 2
"Highway" (featuring Sofía Reyes and Willy William)	2019	—	—	—	—	—	—	—	—	—	— (Note: "Highway" did not enter the Swedish Singellista Chart, but peaked at number 5 on the Swedish Heatseeker Chart.)	—		Non-album single
"No Service in the Hills" (featuring Trippie Redd, blackbear and Prince$$ Rosie)	2020	—	—	—	—	—	—	—	—	—	—	—		Hellraisers, Pt. 2
"On My Life"	2020	—	—	—	—	—	—	—	—	—	—	—		Hellraisers, Pt. 1
"Heaven"	2020	—	—	—	—	—	—	—	—	—	—	—		Hellraisers, Pt. 1
"No Time" (with Dvbbs featuring Wiz Khalifa and Prince$$ Rosie)	2020	—	—	—	—	—	—	—	—	—	—	—		Non-album single
"Between Our Hearts" (featuring Cxloe)	2020	—	—	—	—	—	—	—	—	—	—	—		Hellraisers, Pt. 1
"Stay" (with Bryce Vine)	2020	—	19	—	—	—	—	—	—	37	—	—		Hellraisers, Pt. 1
"Washed Up"	2020	—	37	—	—	—	—	—	—	—	—	—		Hellraisers, Pt. 1
"Do It All Over" (featuring Marc E. Bassy)	2020	—	—	—	—	—	—	—	—	—	—	—		Hellraisers, Pt. 1
"I Just Wanna" (with Felix Jaehn featuring Bow Anderson)	2020	—	—	—	—	—	—	—	—	—	—	—		Hellraisers, Pt. 3
"No Chill" (featuring Lil Xxel)	2021	—	24	—	—	—	—	—	—	—	—	—		Hellraisers, Pt. 1
"Hate You + Love You" (featuring AJ Mitchell)	2021	—	11	—	—	—	—	—	—	31	—	—		Hellraisers, Pt. 1
"That Feeling" (with Danny Quest featuring Hayley May)	2021	—	—	—	—	—	—	—	—	—	—	—		Hellraisers, Pt. 3
"Lean on Me" (featuring Tinashe)	2021	—	12	—	—	—	—	—	—	30	—	—		Hellraisers, Pt. 1
"Never Love You Again" (with Little Big Town and Bryn Christopher)	2021	—	33	—	—	—	—	—	—	—	—	—		One Night in Nashville
"All Things $ Can Do" (with Travis Barker and Tove Styrke)	2021	—	—	—	—	—	—	—	—	—	— (Note: "All Things $ Can Do" did not enter the Swedish Singellista Chart, but peaked at number 14 on the Swedish Heatseeker Chart.)	—		Hellraisers, Pt. 2
"Ghost Story" (with All Time Low)	2021	—	21	—	—	—	—	—	—	—	—	—		Hellraisers, Pt. 2
"Hurricane" (with Grey and Tyson Ritter)	2021	—	—	—	—	—	—	—	—	—	—	—		Hellraisers, Pt. 2
"How Do You Love" (with Lee Brice and Lindsay Ell)	2021	—	21	—	—	—	—	—	—	—	—	—		One Night in Nashville
"Lucky" (with Quarterhead and Kiddo)	2021	—	—	—	—	—	—	—	—	—	—	—		Hellraisers, Pt. 3
"Running" (with Martin Jensen and Teresa Rex)	2022	—	—	—	—	—	—	—	—	39	—	—		Hellraisers, Pt. 3
"Memory" (with Space Primates featuring Gashi)	2022	—	—	—	—	—	—	—	—	—	—	—		Hellraisers, Pt. 3
"Payback" (featuring Icona Pop)	2022	—	—	—	—	—	—	—	—	—	—	—		Hellraisers, Pt. 3
"Afraid of Love" (with Stondon Massey)	2022	—	—	—	—	—	—	—	—	—	—	—		Hellraisers, Pt. 3
"Tell Me You Love Me"	2022	—	—	—	—	—	—	—	—	—	—	—		Hellraisers, Pt. 3
"Back Again" (with Loote and Emma Løv)	2022	—	47	—	—	—	—	—	—	—	—	—		Hellraisers, Pt. 3
"I Remember" (with Russell Dickerson and Dixie D'Amelio)	2022	—	—	—	—	—	—	—	—	40	—	—		One Night in Nashville
"Lose You" (with Jimmie Allen)	2022	—	—	—	—	—	—	—	—	—	—	—		One Night in Nashville
"One Night Left" (with MacKenzie Porter)	2022	—	—	—	—	—	—	—	—	—	—	—		One Night in Nashville
"When You Know" (with Matt Stell)	2022	—	—	—	—	—	—	—	—	—	—	—		One Night in Nashville
"Bets on Us" (with Dolly Parton)	2023	—	—	—	—	—	—	—	—	—	—	—		One Night in Nashville
"What's It Gonna Take" (with Mitchell Tenpenny)	2023	—	33	—	—	—	—	—	—	—	—	—		One Night in Nashville
"Location" (featuring A7S)	2023	—	—	—	—	—	—	—	—	—	—	—		Non-album singles
"You Don't Even Know Me" (with Sam Feldt)	2023	—	—	—	—	—	—	—	—	—	—	—		Non-album singles
"Head Up" (featuring Birdy)	2024	—	—	—	—	—	—	—	—	—	—	—		Non-album singles
"The Way It Is" (with Two Friends)	2024	—	—	—	—	—	—	—	—	—	—	—		Non-album singles
"Stay Another Night" (featuring Regard)	2024	—	—	—	—	—	—	—	—	—	—	—		Non-album singles
"Morning" (with Jason Derulo featuring De La Ghetto and Galantis)	2024	—	—	—	—	—	—	—	—	—	—	—		Non-album singles
"Find Love Now" (featuring Punctual and Raphaella)	2024	—	—	—	—	—	—	—	—	—	—	—		Find Love Now
"Bloom" (featuring Train)	2024	—	—	—	—	—	—	—	—	—	—	—		Future Renaissance
"Modern Tragedy" (with Julia Church)	2024	—	—	—	—	—	—	—	—	—	—	—		Future Renaissance
"Chasing Ghosts" (with Timmy Trumpet)	2024	—	—	—	—	—	—	—	—	—	—	—		Non-album singles
"Cinema" (with YouNotUs featuring Barbz)	2024	—	—	—	—	—	—	—	—	—	—	—		Non-album singles
"TYSM" (with Salem Ilese)	2024	—	—	—	—	—	—	—	—	—	—	—		Future Renaissance
"Stand by Me"	2025	—	—	—	—	—	—	—	—	—	—	—		Future Renaissance
"Don't Leave"	2025	—	—	—	—	—	—	—	—	—	—	—		Future Renaissance
"Carnival" (with Öwnboss)	2025	—	—	—	—	—	—	—	—	—	—	—		Future Renaissance
"More than Anybody" (featuring Izzy Bizu and Kenny G)	2025	—	—	—	—	—	—	—	—	—	—	—		Future Renaissance
"Be Your Friend" (with Edward Maya and Enisa)	2025	—	—	—	—	—	—	—	—	—	—	—		Future Renaissance
"Human" (with LP)	2025	—	—	—	—	—	—	—	—	—	—	—		Future Renaissance
"Go to Hell" (with CeeLo Green)	2025	—	—	—	—	—	—	—	—	—	—	—		Future Renaissance
"Loving You Is Life" (with Alle Farben featuring Joseph)	2025	—	—	—	—	—	—	—	—	—	—	—		Non-album singles
"Miss Me" (with ALTÉGO & Hannah Boleyn)	2026	—	—	—	—	—	—	—	—	—	—	—		Non-album singles
"Last Night On Earth" (with Jonita)	2026	—	—	—	—	—	—	—	—	—	—	—		Non-album singles
"End Of Time" (with Good Humans)	2026	—	—	—	—	—	—	—	—	—	—	—		Non-album singles
"Miles Away" (featuring Joy Oladokun)	2026	—	—	—	—	—	—	—	—	—	—	—		Non-album singles
"River" (featuring Lily Fitts)	2026	—	—	—	—	—	—	—	—	—	—	—		Non-album singles
"The House That We Don't Live in Anymore"	2026	—	—	—	—	—	—	—	—	—	—	—		Non-album singles
"Who I Am"	2026	—	—	—	—	—	—	—	—	—	—	—		Non-album singles
"—" denotes a single that did not chart or was not released.

==== As featured artist ====
List of singles, with selected chart positions and certifications
Title	Year	Peak chart positions										Certifications	Album
Title	Year	US Dance	AUS	BEL	DEN	FRA	GER	ITA	NLD	NOR	UK	Certifications	Album
"Monsters Are Everywhere" (The Siege featuring Cheat Codes)	2015	—	—	—	—	—	—	—	—	—	—		Non-album singles
"Hold On" (Moguai featuring Cheat Codes)	2015	47	—	64	—	—	—	—	86	—	—		Non-album singles
"Shed a Light" (Robin Schulz and David Guetta featuring Cheat Codes)	2016	11	23	26	35	44	6	27	20	30	24	ARIA: 2× Platinum; BPI: Gold; BVMI: Platinum; FIMI: 2× Platinum; IFPI DEN: Gold; SNEP: Gold	Uncovered
"Live Forever" (Liam Payne featuring Cheat Codes)	2019	—	—	—	—	—	—	—	—	—	—		LP1
"Drinking Games (House Rules)" (Warren Zeiders featuring Cheat Codes)	2026	—	—	—	—	—	—	—	—	—	—		
"—" denotes a single that did not chart or was not released.

=== Guest appearances ===
List of non-single guest appearances, showing other artist(s), year released and album name
Title	Year	Other artist(s)	Album
"Revival"	2018	Sigala, MAX	Brighter Days

=== Remixes ===
Title	Year	Artist	Album
"Second Wind"	2015	Kelly Clarkson	Piece by Piece Remixed
"The Daze"	2016	Syn Cole featuring Madame Buttons	Non-album remixes
"New Obsession"	2016	FRANKIE	Non-album remixes
"You Don't Know Love"	2016	Olly Murs	Non-album remixes
"Party"	2016	JP Cooper	Non-album remixes
"Pretty Girl" (Cheat Codes X CADE Remix)	2016	Maggie Lindemann	Non-album remixes
"Heartlines"	2016	Broods	Non-album remixes
"I Got You"	2016	Bebe Rexha	Non-album remixes
"This Town"	2016	Niall Horan	Non-album remixes
"Weak"	2017	AJR	Non-album remixes
"Nights with You"	2017	MØ	Non-album remixes
"Swish Swish"	2017	Katy Perry featuring Nicki Minaj	Non-album remixes
"Wearing Nothing" (Cheat Codes and Cade Remix)	2017	Dagny	Non-album remixes
"Your Song"	2017	Rita Ora	Non-album remixes
"I Like Me Better"	2017	Lauv	Non-album remixes
"Dangerous Night"	2018	Thirty Seconds to Mars	Non-album remixes
"Leave a Light On"	2018	Tom Walker	Non-album remixes
"Mad Love"	2018	Sean Paul and David Guetta featuring Becky G	Non-album remixes
"Love Is Bigger Than Anything in Its Way"	2018	U2	Non-album remixes
"Waste It on Me"	2018	Steve Aoki featuring BTS	Non-album remixes
"Dancing with a Stranger"	2019	Sam Smith and Normani	Non-album remixes
"South of the Border"	2019	Ed Sheeran feat. Camila Cabello and Cardi B	Non-album remixes
