= Fyah =

Studio album by Kevin Lyttle
- Released: 27 August 2008
- Genres: Soca; dancehall
- Labels: Tarakon; Universal
- Producers: De Red Boyz; Fredrik Odesjo; Adrian Bailey; Brian Kierulf; Mark Cyrus; Kevin Rudolf; Godfrey Cherry Ince; Chris Allman; Great Zeee; Parry Jack; Ricardo Raffington

Kevin Lyttle chronology
Kevin Lyttle (2004)	Fyah (2008)	I Love Carnival (2012)

Fyah is the second studio album by Vincentian singer Kevin Lyttle. It was first released in 2008 on Lyttle's own label Tarakon Records.

== Album information ==
Similarly to Lyttle's debut album, Fyah was produced by a team of various producers, blending soca, dancehall and other genres of Caribbean music. The album included a re-recording of his most famous song, "Turn Me On", featuring popular Barbadian soca singer Alison Hinds. Most notably, the song "Something About You," was co-written by well-known American songwriter, Larry Nacht and artist/songwriter Kevin Rudolf. Fyah was released by Lyttle's own music label, Tarakon Records, in Japan in 2008, followed by its international release in 2009. The album charted in Japan, where it was distributed through a licensing deal with Universal Records.

== Singles ==
"Fyah" was released as the lead single in 2008, followed by "Only You" in 2009. Both singles were unsuccessful in charts. "Nobody Like U" was chosen as the next single, accompanied by a remix contest. It was released in 2011 as a limited edition EP with 17 remixes, but failed to chart.

== Track listing ==
Fyah track listing
No.	Title	Length
1.	"Fyah"	3:29
2.	"That Vibe"	3:33
3.	"Be Alright" (featuring Skinny Fabulous)	3:37
4.	"Dangerous"	3:52
5.	"Something About You"	3:58
6.	"Never Got Her Name"	3:25
7.	"My Girl" (featuring Problem Child)	2:56
8.	"Nobody Like U"	2:57
9.	"One More Try"	4:07
10.	"Come See Me" (featuring Lexxus)	3:39
11.	"Party wid Me"	3:42
12.	"Too Good for Me"	4:00
13.	"Don't Want U to Cry"	4:54
14.	"Take a Ride"	3:24
15.	"Only You" (extended mix)	4:02
16.	"Turn Me On" (Love Child Remix) (featuring Alison Hinds)	3:32
17.	"Fyah" (remix) (featuring Problem Child)	3:38
18.	"Fyah" (Tony Moran and Warren Rigg Club Mix))	8:14

== Charts ==
Chart (2008)	Peak position
Japanese Albums Chart	46
