= Let Me Hold You (Turn Me On) =

Single by Cheat Codes and Dante Klein
- Released: July 1, 2016
- Genre: EDM; dancehall; tropical house
- Length: 2:42
- Label: Spinnin' Records
- Songwriters: Arnold Hennings; Daron Jones; Michael Keith; Kevin Lyttle; Quiness Parker; Raeon Primus; Marvin Scandrick; Courtney Sills
- Producer: Dante Klein

Cheat Codes singles chronology
"Can't Fight It" (2016)	"Let Me Hold You (Turn Me On)" (2016)	"Queen Elizabeth" (2016)

Dante Klein singles chronology
"Ertesuppe" (2014)	"Let Me Hold You (Turn Me On)" (2016)	"Harder" (2017)

"Let Me Hold You (Turn Me On)" is a song by American DJ trio Cheat Codes and Dutch DJ Dante Klein. Released by Spinnin' Records on July 1, 2016, the song is largely a cover of Kevin Lyttle's 2003 hit "Turn Me On", though it does include new lyrics. It is the follow-up to Cheat Codes' internationally successful single "Sex".

== Music video ==
The song's music video was released to the Spinnin' Records YouTube channel on June 30, 2016, and was directed by Chris Campbell.

== Track listing ==
Digital download
No.	Title	Length
1.	"Let Me Hold You (Turn Me On)"	2:42
2.	"Let Me Hold You (Turn Me On)" (Extended Mix)	4:17

== Charts ==
=== Weekly charts ===
Chart (2016–17)	Peak position
Australia (ARIA)	38
Austria (Ö3 Austria Top 40)	47
Belgium (Ultratip Bubbling Under Flanders)	5
Belgium (Ultratip Bubbling Under Wallonia)	6
Canada Hot 100 (Billboard)	83
Czech Republic Singles Digital (ČNS IFPI)	32
Denmark (Tracklisten)	19
Germany (GfK)	49
Ireland (IRMA)	22
Italy (FIMI)	51
Mexico Airplay (Billboard)	27
Netherlands (Single Top 100)	27
Norway (VG-lista)	15
Portugal (AFP)	30
Scottish Singles Sales (Official Charts)	35
Slovakia Singles Digital (ČNS IFPI)	30
Sweden (Sverigetopplistan)	12
Switzerland (Schweizer Hitparade)	40
UK Singles (Official Charts)	36
US Hot Dance/Electronic Songs (Billboard)	14

=== Year-end charts ===
Chart (2016)	Position
Denmark (Tracklisten)	80
Netherlands (Single Top 100)	91
Sweden (Sverigetopplistan)	89
US Hot Dance/Electronic Songs (Billboard)	30

== Certifications ==
Region	Certification	Certified units/sales
Australia (ARIA)	Platinum	70,000^{‡}
Denmark (IFPI Danmark)	Platinum	90,000^{‡}
Germany (BVMI)	Gold	200,000^{‡}
Italy (FIMI)	Platinum	50,000^{‡}
New Zealand (RMNZ)	Gold	15,000^{‡}
Norway (IFPI Norway)	Platinum	40,000^{‡}
Sweden (GLF)	2× Platinum	80,000^{‡}
United Kingdom (BPI)	Gold	400,000^{‡}
^{‡} Sales+streaming figures based on certification alone.
