= Who's Got Your Love =

Single by Cheat Codes featuring Daniel Blume

from the EP Level 2
- Released: March 15, 2019
- Recorded: 2019
- Genre: Electropop, dance-pop, EDM
- Length: 2:37
- Label: Too Easy; 300; Spinnin' Records
- Songwriter(s): Daniel Blume; J. Mur; Kevin Ford; Trevor Dahl; Matthew Russell
- Producer(s): Kevin Ford; Trevor Dahl; Daniel Blume

Cheat Codes singles chronology
"Ferrari" (2019)	"Who's Got Your Love" (2019)	"Be the One" (2019)

Music video
- "Who's Got Your Love" on YouTube

"Who's Got Your Love" is a song that was co-produced, co-written and recorded by the American electronic trio Cheat Codes, featuring Irish electronic DJ/singer Daniel Blume. The second release off Cheat Codes' second EP Level 2, the electropop/dance track became their first number one on the Billboard Dance/Mix Show Airplay chart in August 2019.

== Track listing ==
Single

1. Who's Got Your Love - 2:37
