= Andreas S. Jensen =

Danish-born British record producer

- Born: Denmark
- Genres: Alternative rock; indie pop; electronic
- Occupations: Singer-songwriter; record producer; multi-instrumentalist
- Instruments: Vocals; guitar
- Works: Disturbed (2017)
- Years active: 2004–present
- Member of: Dub Pistols
- Formerly of: The Funktuary

Andreas S. Jensen is a Danish-born, London-based, singer-songwriter, record producer and multi-instrumentalist.

== Career ==
Andreas S. Jensen is best known as the guitar player in Dub Pistols, and as the writer and remixer of Armand Van Helden's hit "My My My". Andreas released his solo album Disturbed in late 2017 and received great reviews by classic UK music magazine/blog Sounds Magazine and other cutting edge outlets. The album was preceded by singles Take My Heart And Go, Trust Is My Anchor and Only Die Once which were all played by BBC6 Music, the first two also featuring on Tom Robinsons Mixtape, while the latter ones each had several 100 radio stations, blogs and online mags supporting. In 2020 Andreas released the single Love & War, written with Dustin Welch. The video went viral and was shared approximately 400 times. In 2021 Andreas released the duet "Ordinary People" written with Joe Two Ton Killington and featuring Danish banjo player and vocalist Sine Bach Rüttel.

Other work includes production and arrangement work on the Sam and the Womp song East Meets West (2016), guitar playing on Dub Pistols album "Worshipping the Dollar", and Abbey Road recordings with Desert Ships produced by Hadyn Bendall. Previous years has seen Andreas doing vocal production for Rizzle Kicks vs Dido, producing The King Blues' single "Under The Lampost", recording and mixing The Neutronics debut album, Pete Lawrie and Speech Debelle, and engineering Beatbullyz.

Jensen's song "Painfully Easy" (co-written with Julia Coles) featured on Stefanie Heinzmann's album Masterplan (2008) which went number two on the German Album Chart. His song "So High" (co-written with Delroy Blake and produced by Jensen) features on Kevin Lyttle's self-titled debut album, released by Atlantic Records. In 2006 Jensen produced Daz Sampsons "Teenage Life" which represented the United Kingdom at The Eurovision in Athens that year. As part of The Funktuary, Jensen co-wrote, remixed and did additional production on Armand Van Helden's 2006 hit "My My My", the second most played song on BBC Radio 1 in the year. Jensen co-wrote "Said I'd Show You" on Nate James' debut album Set The Tone (2005), and the song "SMF", which featured on Nate's 2007 album Kingdom Falls, while his song "Baby, Baby" was a Top 40 hit for the Belgian pop star Isabelle Adam in 2004.

In 2010, Jensen co-wrote and produced all eleven songs on The Funktuary's debut album. The Hot City remix of the song "Wip Electric" received support and airplay from BBC Radio 1's Judge Jules and Annie Mac, Kiss FM's Sinden and Loose Cannon, another remix of "Wip Electric" was done by French remixer team Auto, while the Dave Silcox remix of "House On The Hill" written with Chipmunk collaborator Loick Essien (RCA/Sony) was playlisted for six weeks on Gaydar Radio, and was on the Cool Cuts Chart and RecordOfTheDay.com.

As part of the Wise Buddah roster, Jensen and Richard Evans remixed/produced the radio mix of "Truly" by Delerium feat. Nerina Pallot (Nettwerk), which went to number 1 on the UK club charts in early 2004. During the Wise Buddah years, Jensen also did several other radio mixes amongst them two of the song "Been Around The World" by Zena, the first featuring Beenie Man, and the latter Vybz Kartel.

Jensen has written songs with Sam Richie, Loick Essien, Cass Fox, Rollo Armstrong, Booty Luv, Tara McDonald, Jeremy Nail, Charlie MIdnight, Dustin Welch, Ollie J, Nate James, Nano Whitman, Jess Greenfield, Ralph McCarthy, Harmonay, Dominic Brown, Holly James, Joe Killington (aka 2 Ton), Julia Coles, Adam Powers, Liberty X, D-Side, Marcus Winther-John (co-writer of several hits with Danish EMI artist Tim Christensen), and many other writers.
