= Purge (song) =

Single by Willow featuring Siiickbrain
- Released: April 1, 2022
- Genre: Pop-punk; rock
- Length: 2:37
- Label: Roc Nation
- Songwriters: Willow Smith; Siiickbrain
- Producer: No Love for the Middle Child

Willow singles chronology
"Emo Girl" (2022)	"Purge" (2022)	"psychofreak" (2022)

Siiickbrain singles chronology
"Moonlight" (2022)	"Purge" (2022)	"Break Me" (2022)

"Purge" is a song written and performed by American singer Willow featuring fellow American singer Siiickbrain. Produced by No Love for the Middle Child, it was released on April 1, 2022, through Roc Nation.

== Composition ==
"Purge" is a pop-punk and rock song which has been described as an aggressive, high-energy, "screamo-tinged" track. It reminded journalist Emily Zemler of the 2000s. Several publications noted that the song was Willow's most heavy song to date.

== Music video ==
The music video for "Purge", self-directed by Willow, was uploaded to YouTube a week prior to the song's release on other music streaming platforms.

=== Synopsis ===
In the clip, the two artists move around a warehouse with low light levels. Willow applies a tattoo to Siiickbrain's face. The two sing and yell into each others' faces, and kiss in a car. After kissing, the duo destroys the car they were inside of using baseball bats.

=== Reception ===
Zemler remarked that, though the clip was most likely filmed prior to the Chris Rock–Will Smith slapping incident, where the latter was slapped by the former, the clip felt like a "pointed statement" directed at Rock due to the two singers "showcas[ing their] shaven heads", as if it was meant to be a response to Rock's jokes about Jada Pinkett Smith's baldness. Brenton Blanchet called the music video a "good time".

== Credits ==
Credits are adapted from Spotify.

- Willow Smith – performer, songwriter
- Siiickbrain – performer, songwriter
- No Love for the Middle Child – producer

== Release history ==
Release history and formats for "Purge"
Country	Date	Format(s)	Label	Ref.
Various	April 1, 2022	Music download; streaming	Roc Nation; MSFTS	
