= Suckerpunch (Maggie Lindemann album) =

Studio album by Maggie Lindemann
- Released: September 16, 2022
- Recorded: 2021–2022
- Genres: Pop rock; pop-punk; alternative metal
- Length: 39:50
- Labels: swixxzaudio; Virgin
- Producers: Maggie Lindemann; Raziel; Morgotth Beatz; Joshua Murty; Cody Tarpley; No Love For Middle Child; Kmoe; Andrew Goldstein; John Feldmann; Dylan Mclean; Scot Stewart

Maggie Lindemann chronology
Maggie Lindemann Live in Los Angeles – Paranoia (2022)	Suckerpunch (2022)	Headsplit (2024)

Singles from Suckerpunch
- 1. "She Knows It" Released: October 29, 2021; 2. "Break Me!" Released: June 3, 2022; 3. "You're Not Special" Released: July 15, 2022; 4. "Cages" Released: September 16, 2022

Suckerpunch is the debut studio album by American singer-songwriter Maggie Lindemann, released through swixxzaudio on September 16, 2022.

== Background and production ==
Following the success of "Pretty Girl", which became a chart-topping success in several countries, Maggie Lindemann no longer wanted to be pushed by her former label into recording more pop singles. Lindemann stated, "I was so young, and being so young, and then put into something where you don't know anything about it, you just kind of listen to what people say, and then it fucks you in the long run." She later stated that the "bubblegum stuff" she did was not a representation of her at all.

Lindemann eventually departed her record label and started releasing music through a distributor to be able to own her masters and have creative control.

On the album title, Lindemann stated that "suckerpunch means 'a series of unexpected blows or punches,' and that's what I felt like it was. It was a series of blows emotionally and mentally", in relation to her disapproval of being in her previous record label.

Suckerpunch was preceded by the release of several singles—"She Knows It", "How Could You Do This to Me?", "Break Me!", "You're Not Special", "Self Sabotage" and "Cages".

== Composition ==
=== Artwork ===
The album's cover artwork is an image depicting Maggie Lindemann smoking in a small restroom with a sultry look on her face and the surroundings in green light. Lindemann stated that the image was taken in her old bathroom and that she pasted the cutouts from old issues of Playboy on the walls herself.

=== Music ===
The album has been described as a pop-punk and rock and roll record. Its sound and lyrical matter has been compared to Created from Filth and Dust by Lilith Czar and Holy Fvck by Demi Lovato. The album's lyrical matter deals with loss, love, anger, jealousy and pride.

The album features guest vocalists such as Siiickbrain on "Break Me!" and Kellin Quinn of Sleeping with Sirens on "How Can You Do This to Me?".

The closing track, "Cages", is a "rebellious" song telling people to act without shame and be proud of who they are.

== Touring ==
Lindemann held her first two sold-out headline shows at the Moroccan Lounge in Los Angeles and Mercury Lounge in New York respectively, in October 2022, playing the album in its entirety.

Between September and October 2022, Lindemann also performed at Louisville's Louder Than Life festival and Sacramento's Aftershock Festival, playing alongside popular acts such as Foo Fighters, My Chemical Romance and Evanescence.

In January 2023, Lindemann will be an opening act for Pvris on their European concert tour in Manchester, Glasgow, Birmingham, and London. In May, she will travel to Slam Dunk festival in Hatfield and Leeds, playing alongside popular acts such as Enter Shikari and The Offspring. In June, she will perform at Rock am Ring and Rock im Park in Nürburgring and Nuremberg, Germany.

On January 17, she announced the Suckerpunch World Tour, her first headlining concert tour, which is set to begin March 21 in San Diego and conclude June 9 in Milan.

== Track listing ==
Suckerpunch track listing
No.	Title	Writer(s)	Producer(s)	Length
1.	"Intro / Welcome In"	Maggie Lindemann; Austin Woodward	Raziel	1:16
2.	"Take Me Nowhere"	Lindemann; Woodward; Elijah Noll; Morgoth Beatz	Raziel; Morgoth Beatz	2:54
3.	"She Knows It"	Lindemann; Joshua Murty; Cody Tarpley; Paris Carney	Murty; Tarpley	2:36
4.	"Casualty of Your Dreams"	Lindemann; Andrew Migliore; Carney	No Love For The Middle Child	3:17
5.	"Self Sabotage"	Lindemann; Tarpley; Murty; Larzz Principato; Lauren Mandel	Murty; Tarpley; Kmoe; Lindemann	3:02
6.	"Phases"	Lindemann; Andrew Goldstein; Nick Long	Goldstein	3:03
7.	"I'm So Lonely with You"	Lindemann; Murty; Tarpley; Carney	Murty; Tarpley; kmoe	2:49
8.	"Break Me!" (with Siiickbrain)	Lindemann; Caroline Miner Smith; Migliore	No Love For Middle Child	2:33
9.	"Girl Next Door"	Lindemann; Murty; Tarpley; Marisa Maino	Murty; Tarpley; kmoe	2:00
10.	"We Never Even Dated"	Lindemann; Tarpley; Murty; Principato; Mandel	Lindemann; Murty; Tarpley	2:46
11.	"Novocaine"	Lindemann; Murty; Alex Lahey	Murty; Tarpley	2:41
12.	"You're Not Special"	Lindemann; Tarpley; Murty; Mandel	Murty; Tarpley	2:46
13.	"Hear Me Out"	Lindemann; Murty; Tarpley; Carney	Murty; Tarpley	2:50
14.	"How Could You Do This to Me?" (with Kellin Quinn)	Lindemann; Murty; Tarpley; Lahey	Murty; Tarpley	2:40
15.	"Cages"	Lindemann; John Feldmann; Rachel West; Lahey	Feldmann; Dylan Mclean; Scot Stewart	2:31
Total length:				39:50
