= Turn Me On (Kevin Lyttle song) =

2003 single by Kevin Lyttle

Single by Kevin Lyttle featuring Spragga Benz

from the album Kevin Lyttle
- Released: 13 October 2003
- Genre: Soca
- Length: 3:13 (album version); 3:21 (remix)
- Label: Atlantic
- Songwriters: Arnold Hennings; Daron Jones; Michael Keith; Kevin Lyttle; Quinnes Parker; Raeon Primus; Marvin Scandrick; Courtney Sills
- Producers: Adrian Bailey (original); Jeremy Harding (remix)

Kevin Lyttle singles chronology
"Turn Me On" (2003)	"Sexy Ways" (2003)

Music videos
- "Turn Me On" on YouTube
- "Turn Me On" (remix) on YouTube

"Turn Me On" is a song by Vincentian singer Kevin Lyttle. It was released as his debut single and as the lead single from his self-titled debut album. The song was originally a soca ballad released in 2002 on the VP Records sublabel Waist Line Muzik, remade into a dance hit for the US release. Featuring Spragga Benz in the radio remix, "Turn Me On" became a worldwide hit, reaching number one in Denmark and peaking within the top 10 in 16 other countries.

== Song information ==
The song interpolates "All My Love", a song by R&B group 112 from their album Room 112. The remix features additional lyrics performed by dancehall artist Spragga Benz.

Various remixes of the song exist. Some radio stations played the pop mix with added drums or a 'Bubbling/Part II' remix by DJ Lipe (Santiago, Chile), featuring additional female vocals. There have also been several reggaeton remixes of the song including one featuring Ivy Queen. A 'Mad Hatters Ball' remix featuring Alison Hinds was also released. In 2008, the song was re-recorded with Hinds for Lyttle's second album, Fyah.

The song peaked on the Billboard Hot 100 at number four on 14 August, staying on the chart for months. It reached number two in the United Kingdom for two weeks (being the best selling non-new entry song twice), number one in Denmark, and number three in Australia. It remains Lyttle's biggest hit to date.

The song was included on Billboard's "12 Best Dancehall & Reggaeton Choruses of the 21st Century" at number one.

== Track listings ==
UK CD single

1. "Turn Me On" (UK mix) – 3:12
2. "Turn Me On" (radio edit featuring Spragga Benz) – 3:21
3. "Turn Me On" (original mix) – 3:21
4. "Turn Me On" (video featuring Spragga Benz)

UK 12-inch single

A1. "Turn Me On" (UK mix) – 3:12
B1. "Turn Me On" (radio edit featuring Spragga Benz) – 3:21
B2. "Turn Me On" (original instrumental) – 3:21

European CD single

1. "Turn Me On" (radio mix)
2. "Turn Me On" (featuring Spragga Benz)

Australian CD single

1. "Turn Me On" (UK mix) – 3:12
2. "Turn Me On" (radio edit featuring Spragga Benz) – 3:21
3. "Turn Me On" (original mix) – 3:21

US 7-inch single

A. "Turn Me On" (album version) – 3:13
B. "Turn Me On" (remix featuring Spragga Benz) – 3:20

US 12-inch single

A1. "Turn Me On" (album version) – 3:13
A2. "Turn Me On" (club mix) – 3:58
A3. "Turn Me On" (album instrumental) – 3:13
B1. "Turn Me On" (remix featuring Spragga Benz) – 3:20
B2. "Turn Me On" (remix instrumental) – 3:20

== Charts ==
=== Weekly charts ===
Chart (2003–2004)	Peak position
Australia (ARIA)	3
Australian Urban (ARIA)	2
Austria (Ö3 Austria Top 40)	6
Belgium (Ultratop 50 Flanders)	5
Belgium (Ultratop 50 Wallonia)	11
Belgium Dance (Ultratop Flanders)	11
Canada CHR/Pop Top 30 (Radio & Records)	12
Czech Republic (IFPI)	6
Denmark (Tracklisten)	1
Europe (Eurochart Hot 100)	3
France (SNEP)	10
Germany (GfK)	2
Greece (IFPI)	2
Hungary (Rádiós Top 40)	33
Hungary (Dance Top 40)	4
Hungary (Single Top 40)	4
Ireland (IRMA)	14
Italy (FIMI)	3
Netherlands (Dutch Top 40)	3
Netherlands (Single Top 100)	2
New Zealand (Recorded Music NZ)	19
Norway (VG-lista)	2
Romania (Romanian Top 100)	7
Scottish Singles Sales (Official Charts)	8
Sweden (Sverigetopplistan)	5
Switzerland (Schweizer Hitparade)	3
UK Singles (Official Charts)	2
UK Hip Hop/R&B (Official Charts)	1
US Billboard Hot 100	4
US Dance Club Play (Billboard) Remixes	22
US Dance Radio Airplay (Billboard)	1
US Dance Singles Sales (Billboard) Remixes	1
US Hot R&B/Hip-Hop Singles & Tracks (Billboard)	20
US Mainstream Top 40 (Billboard)	4
US Rhythmic Top 40 (Billboard)	5

=== Year-end charts ===
Chart (2003)	Position
Ireland (IRMA)	96
Netherlands (Dutch Top 40)	43
Netherlands (Single Top 100)	34
UK Singles (OCC)	14
UK Urban (Music Week)	26

Chart (2004)	Position
Australia (ARIA)	29
Australian Urban (ARIA)	8
Austria (Ö3 Austria Top 40)	29
Belgium (Ultratop 50 Flanders)	54
Belgium (Ultratop 50 Wallonia)	44
France (SNEP)	58
Germany (Media Control GfK)	19
Italy (FIMI)	8
Sweden (Hitlistan)	60
Switzerland (Schweizer Hitparade)	12
US Billboard Hot 100	27
US Dance Radio Airplay (Billboard)	2
US Dance Singles Sales (Billboard)	25
US Hot R&B/Hip-Hop Singles & Tracks (Billboard)	85
US Mainstream Top 40 (Billboard)	24
US Rhythmic Top 40 (Billboard)	20

Chart (2005)	Position
US Dance Singles Sales (Billboard)	10

== Certifications ==
Region	Certification	Certified units/sales
Australia (ARIA)	Platinum	70,000^{^}
Denmark (IFPI Danmark)	Gold	45,000^{‡}
Germany (BVMI)	Gold	150,000^{^}
New Zealand (RMNZ)	Platinum	30,000^{‡}
Norway (IFPI Norway)	Gold	5,000^{*}
Switzerland (IFPI Switzerland)	Gold	20,000^{^}
United Kingdom (BPI)	2× Platinum	1,200,000^{‡}
United States (RIAA) Digital	Gold	500,000^{*}
United States (RIAA) Mastertone	Gold	500,000^{*}
^{*} Sales figures based on certification alone.^{^} Shipments figures based on certification alone.^{‡} Sales+streaming figures based on certification alone.

== Release history ==
Region	Date	Format(s)	Label(s)	Ref.
United Kingdom	13 October 2003	7-inch vinyl; CD	Atlantic	
Australia	9 February 2004	CD	Atlantic	
United States	26 April 2004	Rhythmic contemporary radio	Atlantic	
United States	3 May 2004	Urban radio	Atlantic	
United States	10 May 2004	Contemporary hit radio	Atlantic	

== Other versions ==
In 2016, the song was covered by American DJ trio Cheat Codes and Dutch DJ Dante Klein, titled "Let Me Hold You (Turn Me On)", released on Spinnin' Records.

The song was interpolated by American singer Chris Brown in his 2017 single "Questions".

In January 2017, a revamped Latin version was released by Colombian singer AstrA under the title "Turn Me On Fuego" featuring Kevin Lyttle himself and Costi on the Cortes Entertainment label. The recording is a bilingual version in English and Spanish.

In 2023, Australian electronic musician Luude and English rapper Bru-C released their version titled "TMO (Turn Me On)" which peaked at No. 42 on the UK Singles Chart.
