= Headsplit =

- Standard cover

EP by Maggie Lindemann
- Released: March 8, 2024
- Genre: Pop-punk
- Length: 22:54
- Label: Swixxzaudio
- Producer: No Love for the Middle Child; Zach Jones; Joshua Murty

Maggie Lindemann chronology
| Suckerpunch (2022) | Headsplit (2024) | I Feel Everything (2025) |

Singles from Headsplit
- 1. "Deprecating" Released: October 13, 2023; 2. "Hostage" Released: January 19, 2024

Headsplit is the second extended play by American singer-songwriter Maggie Lindemann, released through Swixxzaudio on March 8, 2024.

== Background ==
Lindemann released her debut EP Paranoia in 2021, and her debut studio album Suckerpunch in 2022. Headsplit was announced by Lindermann in February 2024. She released the lead single from the EP in January 2024 which was called "Hostage". Headsplit features collaborations from Siiickbrain, Alexis Munroe and Jasiah. A music video for "Taking Over Me" featuring Jasiah, was released to coincide with the EP on March 8, 2024, inspired by the film Thirteen.

== Composition ==
Headsplit finds Lindemann expanding her pop-punk roots by incorporating goth-rock, hyperpop, and industrial elements across its eight-track run. Thematically, the EP explores emotional turbulence, with songs touching on red flags in relationships and crippling anxiety. Lindemann described the project as showing "a softer side" of herself, noting that it explores aspects of love and emotional openness she had previously avoided: "It's diving into a different part of my life that I haven’t really ever been comfortable to talk about", she explained, adding that despite her intention for a lighter tone, "everyone's been saying it doesn't [sound that way], so I guess it doesn't".

== Singles ==
On October 13, 2023, Lindemann released a collaboration with Siiickbrain called "Deprecating", the lead single from the EP. The second single "Hostage" was released on January 19, 2024, alongside an official music video.

== Critical reception ==
Headsplit received a positive response from some music critics. Euphoria Magazine praised the EP as "a triumphant response to the music executives who stole her sound", noting that it continues the artistic direction established in Lindemann's 2021 project Paranoia. The outlet described the EP as "spine-chilling" and highlighted Lindemann's unapologetic embrace of her identity as a defining strength. Jake Richardson of Kerrang! stated "The overall result is the sound of an artist finding their voice and embracing their identity, and that’s something worth celebrating."

== Track listing ==
Headsplit – Standard edition
| No. | Title | Writer(s) | Producer(s) | Length |
|---|---|---|---|---|
| 1. | "Rip My Heart Out" | Maggie Lindemann | No Love For The Middle Child | 2:50 |
| 2. | "Die For" | Lindemann | Zach Jones | 3:27 |
| 3. | "Deprecating" (with Siiickbrain) | Lindemann; Caroline Miner Smith | No Love For The Middle Child | 2:06 |
| 4. | "You Hold My Love" | Lindemann | Joshua Murty | 3:22 |
| 5. | "One Last Time" | Lindemann | Jones | 3:10 |
| 6. | "24" (with Alexis Munroe) | Lindemann | Murty | 2:50 |
| 7. | "Hostage" | Lindemann | Murty | 2:43 |
| 8. | "Taking Over Me" (with Jasiah) | Lindemann; Jasiah | Jones | 2:23 |
| Total length: | | | | 22:54 |

Headsplit – Deluxe edition
| No. | Title | Writer(s) | Producer(s) | Length |
|---|---|---|---|---|
| 1. | "Who Are You When You're Alone?" | Maggie Lindemann | No Love For The Middle Child | 2:25 |
| 2. | "If It's Not With You" | Lindemann | No Love For The Middle Child | 2:33 |
| 3. | "Decode" | Hayley Williams; Josh Farro; Taylor York | Joshua Murty | 4:20 |
| Total length: | | | | 32:12 |
