= Tania Marie Caringi =

American-Italian model (1986–2025)

- Caringi in 2022
- Born: September 1986; Michigan, U.S.
- Died: 1 May 2025 (aged 38); Rome, Italy
- Other names: Tania Marie
- Occupation: Model

Tania Marie Caringi (September 1986 – 1 May 2025), also known as Tania Marie, was an American-Italian model. She appeared in magazines such as Playboy, Sports Illustrated, and Maxim. Other magazines that she appeared in include GQ, Celeb, FHM, and Esquire.

== Early life ==
Caringi was born in Michigan to an Italian father from Sora, Lazio and an American mother from New Jersey. She spent her childhood in the United States and Italy. She began her modeling career after being scouted by a fashion agent in Italy at the age of 19. She was a contestant in the Miss Italia USA 2010 pageant.

== Career ==
In 2013, Caringi was featured in the music video for "Anywhere" by Kevin Lyttle feat. Flo Rida. In October 2014, she joined the Vyzion Radio Elite Model Team.

She was featured among MODE's 100 Most Beautiful Women for three consecutive years. She was ranked #1 in 2014, #27 in 2015, and #7 in 2016. Caringi also worked with LuLu Cosmetics in 2014.

Caringi appeared in Playboy Venezuela in 2017, and was also on the cover of the June 2017 edition of Playboy Italia. She was also featured in GQ Mexico in October 2017.

She was featured as Playbabe of the Month in the January–February 2018 edition of Mancave Playbabes. In March 2018, she was featured in a pictorial for Sports Illustrated. She was also featured in both the United States and Italian 2018 editions of Maxim. Caringi appeared on the cover of the 2020 Collector's Edition Update of MODE's 2016 100 Most Beautiful Women list. She also appeared in the March 2020 issue of Vogue Italia.

Caringi co-hosted the 2019 Miss Universe Italy beauty pageant in August 2019.

Other magazines that Caringi appeared in include FHM, Celeb, and Esquire. She modeled clothing for designers and companies in fashion markets such as Milan, Rome, New York, and Los Angeles.

Caringi continued to live and work in both the United States and Italy.

== Death ==
Caringi died from an illness at Agostino Gemelli University Policlinic in Rome, on 1 May 2025, at the age of 38.
