= Kevin Lyttle =

Vincentian soca artist (born 1976)

- Born: Lescott Kevin Lyttle Coombs; 14 September 1976 (age 49); Kingstown, Saint Vincent and the Grenadines
- Genres: Soca; dancehall; R&B
- Years active: 2001–present
- Labels: Atlantic, Tarakon, Star
- Spouse: Jacqueline James
- Website: facebook.com/KevinLyttleMusic

Lescott Kevin Lyttle Coombs (born 14 September 1976) is a Vincentian soca singer. He is best known for his 2003 hit single "Turn Me On", which peaked at number four on the Billboard Hot 100.

== Career ==
Lyttle was encouraged by his family to pursue music at the young age and has been performing at local events in his teens. Prior to his musical career, Lyttle had subsisted on day jobs, such as customs officer and radio disc jockey. Investing his savings of EC$1,500, Lyttle recorded "Turn Me On" as a soca ballad in Saint Vincent and the Grenadines in 2001, and the song subsequently became a radio hit throughout the Caribbean.

Lyttle signed with Atlantic Records in 2003 and a remixed version of "Turn Me On" was officially released as a single in the UK at the end of the year, with dancehall pop artist Spragga Benz's guest vocals. The song reached number two in the UK, spending seven weeks in the Top 10 of the UK Singles Chart. It eventually became a worldwide hit in 2004, reaching number 4 in the United States, number 3 in Australia and placing within Top 5 in many European countries.

The debut self-titled album Kevin Lyttle followed in July 2004, charting within Top 10 in the US, where it was certified Gold, and meeting with a minor success in Europe. The second single, "Last Drop", was released in markets outside the US, but didn't manage to repeat the success of "Turn Me On", becoming only a minor hit in Europe. "Drive Me Crazy" was released as the third single in autumn 2004, followed by a promotional only single "I Got It". Both songs were commercial failures. In 2005, Lyttle released a new song in Jamaica only, "Jimmy Johnny".

In 2007, along with Byron Lee and Arrow, he performed at the Cricket World Cup opening ceremony in Greenfield Stadium, Jamaica. The same year Kevin Lyttle founded his own record label, Tarakon Records. Lyttle's second album, Fyah, was released by Tarakon and Universal Records in 2008, featuring a duet version of "Turn Me On" recorded with Alison Hinds and contributions from other artists. The title song was released as the first single and both the single and the album were unsuccessful in terms of commercial performance.

Lyttle released "Anywhere", a collaboration single with Flo Rida in 2011, followed by "Nobody Like U", accompanied by a remix contest. The music video featured model Tania Marie Caringi. His third studio album, I Love Carnival, was released in 2012, promoted by "Wine and Go Down" and the title song. 2013 saw the release of his new single, "Bounce", followed by "Feel So Good", a collaboration with Shaggy, in 2014.

In 2016, American electronic group Cheat Codes sampled Lyttle's "Turn Me On" in a remix entitled "Let Me Hold You (Turn Me On)". The following year, American singer Chris Brown also sampled "Turn Me On" to make his song "Questions" in 2017.

== Personal life ==
Born Lescott Kevin Lyttle Coombs in Kingstown, Saint Vincent and the Grenadines, Lyttle now lives in Miami, Florida. He is married to Dr. Jacqueline James, with whom he has a son.

== Discography ==
=== Studio albums ===
List of studio albums, with selected chart positions and certifications
Title	Album details	Peak chart positions										Certifications
Title	Album details	AUT	FRA	GER	JPN	NLD	NOR	POR	SWI	UK	US	Certifications
Kevin Lyttle	Released: 27 July 2004 (US); Label: Atlantic; Formats: CD, LP, digital download	68	105	42	12	39	33	24	10	86	8	RIAA: Gold
Fyah	Released: 27 August 2008 (JPN); Labels: Tarakon, Universal; Formats: CD, digital download	—	—	—	46	—	—	—	—	—	—	
I Love Carnival	Released: 7 August 2012 (US); Label: Tarakon; Formats: CD, digital download	—	—	—	—	—	—	—	—	—	—	
"—" denotes a recording that did not chart or was not released in that territory.

=== Extended plays ===
List of extended plays
Title	EP details
It's On	Released: 20 October 2012 (US); Label: RSQTHP; Format: Digital download

=== Singles ===
List of singles, with selected chart positions and certifications, showing year released and album name
Title	Year	Peak chart positions										Certifications	Album
Title	Year	AUS	BEL (FL)	DEN	GER	NLD	NOR	SWE	SWI	UK	US	Certifications	Album
"Turn Me On"	2003	3	5	1	2	2	2	5	3	2	4	ARIA: Platinum; BPI: 2× Platinum; BVMI: Gold; IFPI DEN: Gold; IFPI NOR: Gold; IFPI SWI: Gold; RIAA: Gold	Kevin Lyttle
"Sexy Ways" (featuring Trini Jacobs)	2003	—	—	—	—	—	—	—	—	—	—		Kevin Lyttle (Japan release); Sexy Ways (Trini Jacobs album)
"Last Drop"	2004	39	37	—	58	23	—	36	20	22	—		Kevin Lyttle
"Drive Me Crazy"	2004	—	—	—	—	—	—	—	—	—	—		Kevin Lyttle
"I Got It"	2005	—	—	—	—	—	—	—	—	—	—		Kevin Lyttle
"Jimmy Johnny"	2005	—	—	—	—	—	—	—	—	—	—		—N/a
"Fyah"	2008	—	—	—	—	—	—	—	—	—	—		Fyah
"Only You"	2009	—	—	—	—	—	—	—	—	—	—		Fyah
"Anywhere" (featuring Flo Rida)	2011	—	—	—	—	—	—	—	—	—	—		—N/a
"Nobody Like U"	2011	—	—	—	—	—	—	—	—	—	—		Fyah
"Wine and Go Down"	2011	—	—	—	—	—	—	—	—	—	—		I Love Carnival
"Hot Girls & Alcohol"	2011	—	—	—	—	—	—	—	—	—	—		—N/a
"I Love Carnival" (featuring Skinny Fabulous)	2012	—	—	—	—	—	—	—	—	—	—		I Love Carnival
"Paradise" (featuring Victoria Aitken)	2012	—	—	—	—	—	—	—	—	—	—		—N/a
"Come a Little Closer" (Fucha Kid featuring Kevin Lyttle)	2013	—	—	—	—	—	—	—	—	—	—		—N/a
"Bounce"	2013	—	—	—	—	—	—	—	—	—	—		—N/a
"It's On" (Remix) (featuring Xyclone, Red Rat, Deva Bratt and Delly Branx)	2013	—	—	—	—	—	—	—	—	—	—		It's On
"Feel So Good" (featuring Shaggy)	2014	—	—	—	—	—	—	—	—	—	—		—N/a
"Busy" (Boy Face & Wolffman featuring Kevin Lyttle and Rootsy)	2014	—	—	—	—	—	—	—	—	—	—		—N/a
"Bum Bum" (featuring Mýa)	2015	—	—	—	—	—	—	—	—	—	—		—N/a
"Slow Motion (Banx & Ranx Edit)"	2017	—	—	—	—	—	—	—	—	—	—		—N/a
"—" denotes a recording that did not chart or was not released in that territory.
