= Siiickbrain =

American singer and model

SIIICKBRAIN
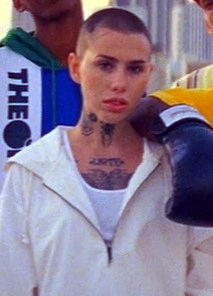
- SIIICKBRAIN in 2018
- Born: Caroline Miner Smith; Morganton, North Carolina, U.S.
- Occupations: Singer; model
- Years active: 2020–present
- Musical career
- Origin: Los Angeles, California, U.S.
- Genres: Alternative metal; alternative rock
- Instrument: Vocals
- Labels: Lowly; Rise
- Website: siiickbrainworld.com

Caroline Miner Smith (born November 26, 1995), known professionally as Siiickbrain, is an American singer, songwriter, and model. She began independently releasing music in 2020 and her debut studio album, My Masochistic Mind, was released in 2023.

== Life and career ==
Caroline Miner Smith was born and raised in Morganton, North Carolina, where she lived on a farm. She has stated that she "didn't fit in" with those from her conservative hometown and that she had anxiety stemming from her agoraphobia, which kept her from pursuing music as a career. She moved to Brooklyn to attend the Makeup Designory, a cosmetology school in SoHo, and later worked as a makeup artist. She also started modeling after walking the runway at a hairstylist convention and soon moved to Los Angeles and signed to Next Management.

In March 2020, following the death of her best friend from a drug overdose, she wrote and independently released her first song, "Cigarettes and Cartier", as Siiickbrain, which was her Instagram handle at the time. She was featured on Maggie Lindemann's single "Gaslight!" in September 2020. Siiickbrain appeared in the 2021 film Downfalls High, which was directed by Machine Gun Kelly and based on his 2020 album Tickets to My Downfall. Her single "Power", a collaboration with Pussy Riot founder Nadya Tolokonnikova, was released in March 2021 and later included on the soundtrack for the 2022 film Bullet Train. She was featured on the Skrillex song "Too Bizarre" alongside Swae Lee in May 2021 and on the Willow single "Purge" in April 2022. Her single "Hellslide" was released in September 2021, while her single "Jealousy" was released in July 2022.

Siiickbrain was featured on Maggie Lindemann's song "Break Me!" in June 2022 and performed as a supporting act on Bring Me the Horizon's North American tour in fall 2022. Siiickbrain released her single "Bloodpuddle" in March 2023. She was featured on Maggie Lindemann's single "Deprecating" in October 2023. She signed to Lowly Records in 2023 and her debut studio album, My Masochistic Mind, was released through the label on December 1, 2023. Its singles "Die Quietly" and "Psychopath" were released in August and October 2023, respectively.

== Musical style ==
Siiickbrain has listed Death Grips, Deftones, and Suicideboys as her biggest musical influences. For V, Kala Herh wrote that Siiickbrain "blends dark pop with alternative rock", while Sam Law of Kerrang! wrote that she was "caught between the worlds of airy alt. pop and thumping dark electro" and described her lyrics as "a runaway stream-of-consciousness". Steffanee Wang of Nylon wrote described her songs as "jagged part-metal, part-hyperpop explosions on which she screams most of her downcast lyrics". Her music has also been described as alternative metal, alt-punk, and experimental rock.

== Discography ==
=== Studio albums ===
Title	Album details
My Masochistic Mind	Released: December 1, 2023; Label: Lowly; Formats: Digital download, streaming

=== Extended plays ===
Title	Album details
Ashtray for Your Agony	Released: December 10, 2021; Label: Lowly; Formats: Digital download, streaming

=== Singles ===
==== As lead artist ====
Title	Year	Album
"Cigarettes and Cartier"	2020	Non-album singles
"So Scary"	2020	Non-album singles
"Waste My Time"	2020	Non-album singles
"Pin Cushion"	2020	Non-album singles
"Power" (with Pussy Riot)	2021	Bullet Train
"Too Bizarre" (with Skrillex and Swae Lee)	2021	Non-album singles
"Silence"	2021	Non-album singles
"Hellslide"	2021	Non-album singles
"Ohio Is for Lovers" (with Hawthorne Heights)	2021	Non-album singles
"Zombie"	2021	Non-album singles
"Destructible"	2021	Ashtray for Your Agony
"Help_Urself 2" (with Ezekiel)	2022	Earcandy
"Moonlight" (with Kayzo)	2022	New Breed
"Break Me!" (with Maggie Lindemann)	2022	Suckerpunch
"Jealousy"	2022	Non-album singles
"Cut the Cable" (with Ezekiel)	2022	Non-album singles
"Fear the Sun"	2022	Non-album singles
"Don't Wait"	2023	Non-album singles
"Blood Puddle"	2023	Non-album singles
"Absolution"	2023	Non-album singles
"Deep End"	2023	Non-album singles
"Parasite"	2023	My Masochistic Mind
"Die Quietly"	2023	My Masochistic Mind
"Deprecating" (with Maggie Lindemann)	2023	Headsplit
"Psychopath"	2023	My Masochistic Mind

==== As featured artist ====
Title	Year	Album
"Gaslight!" (Maggie Lindemann featuring Siiickbrain)	2020	Paranoia
"Purge" (Willow featuring Siiickbrain)	2022	Non-album single

=== Other charted songs ===
List of other charted songs, showing year released, selected chart positions and album
Title	Year	Peak chart positions	Album
Title	Year	US Dance	Album
"Too Bizarre (Juked)"	2023	36	Quest for Fire
