= Last Drop (film) =

- Directed by: Nishith Sahasransu Ray
- Written by: Nishith Sahasransu Ray
- Cinematography: Swarup Ranjan
- Edited by: Nishith Sahasransu Ray
- Release date: 2020
- Running time: 1 minute
- Country: India
- Language: English

Last Drop is a 2020 Indian 1-minute short documentary film written and directed by Nishith Sahasransu Ray. This short film is an awareness film on water conservation.

== Plot ==
"Last Drop" ingeniously uses a simple idea—a leaking tap – to deliver a profound message about water conservation. Through its minimalist approach.

== Production ==
This film was produced, written, edited, and directed by Nishith Sahsransu Ray. He made the film while he was pursuing engineering. Swarup Ranjan was the cinematographer. Sound mixing was done by Pratap Kumar.

== Awards ==
“Last Drop” has been selected for screening in various film festivals. It was selected for screening at Central Illinois Feminist Film Festival (USA) in 2020 for its documentary category, Japan world's tourism film festival in 2020, Longless Film Festival 2020, Lift Off global Network sessions film festival, 2020 (UK), Muestra de Video Arte Faenza (Cuba)-2020, and Miami 4 Social Change Youth Film Festival (USA), 2020 and Honorable Mention at Cinemaking International Film Festival (Dhaka), 2021.
