= Dante Klein =

Dutch DJ and record producer

- Born: Donny de Soet; 17 October 1997 (age 28); Amsterdam, Netherlands
- Genres: House; pop; tropical house; deep house
- Occupations: DJ; record producer
- Years active: 2014—present
- Labels: Spinnin' Deep; Spinnin'

Donny de Soet (Dutch pronunciation: [ˈdɔni də ˈsut]; born 17 October 1997), also known professionally as Dante Klein (pronounced [ˈdɑntə ˈklɛin]), is a Dutch DJ and record producer. He is best known for his collaboration with American DJ trio Cheat Codes for the single "Let Me Hold You (Turn Me On)".

== Career ==
Klein's first single, "Ertesuppe," was released in 2014 on Spinnin' Records and was featured on Pete Tong's BBC Radio 1. His 2016 collaboration "Let Me Hold You (Turn Me On)" with Cheat Codes was a commercial success and has been awarded Gold and Platinum status in several countries. He has also released collaborations with numerous other artists, including HAILZ, Bone Thugs n Harmony, Jantine, Dylan Jagger, Feli Ferraro, and Cimo Frankel.

Klein has performed at numerous electronic music festivals around the world, including Tomorrowland (Belgium), Ushuaïa (Ibiza), Nova Era Festival (Portugal), Sunrise Festival (Poland), Ohrid Calling (Macedonia), Sounce Parade (South Korea), and ADE (Amsterdam).

== Discography ==
=== Charted singles ===
List of singles, with selected chart positions and certifications
Title	Year	Peak chart positions										Certifications	Album
Title	Year	NLD	AUS	BEL	DEN	GER	IRE	NOR	POR	SWE	UK	Certifications	Album
"Let Me Hold You (Turn Me On)" (with Cheat Codes)	2016	27	38	55	19	49	22	15	30	12	36	ARIA: Platinum; BPI: Silver	Non-album single
"—" denotes a single that did not chart or was not released.

=== Other singles ===
Adapted from iTunes.

- "Ertesuppe" (2014)
- "Feels Like Home" (with Sam Feldt featuring Milow) (2016)
- "Harder" (featuring HAILZ) (2017)
- "Coke & Hennessy" (with the 87's featuring Bone Thugs-N-Harmony) (2017)
- "What I Like About U" (with Jantine) (2017)
- "Contagious" (with Dylan Jagger featuring Feli Ferraro) (2018)
- "what i like about u" (with Jantine) (2018)
- "Nothin' On You" (2018)
- "The Way I Love You" (with Cat Carpenters featuring Cimo Fränkel) (2018)
- "Lost At Sea" (2019)
- "Escape" (with Raven & Kreyn)(2019)
- "Tell It to My Heart" (with Megan Brands) (2022)

=== Remixes ===
Adapted from SoundCloud.

- Kim Churchill — "Window To The Sky" (2015)
- Dimitri Vegas & Like Mike featuring Ne-Yo — "Higher Place" (2015)
- Tobtok featuring Alex Mills — "Shelter" (2015)
- Yellow Claw featuring Yade Lauren — "Invitation" (2016)
- Cheat Codes — "Queen Elizabeth" (2017)
- CVBZ — "Be Like You" (2017)
