= Pretty Girl (Maggie Lindemann song) =

Single by Maggie Lindemann
- Released: September 30, 2016 (original); March 3, 2017 (Cheat Codes x CADE remix)
- Genre: Pop (original version); house; tropical house (Cheat Codes x CADE remix)
- Length: 3:39
- Label: 300
- Songwriters: Maggie Lindemann; Alexandra Yatchenko; Sean Myer
- Producer: Jayson DeZuzio

Maggie Lindemann singles chronology
"Things" (2016)	"Pretty Girl" (2016)	"Personal" (2017)

Music video
- "Pretty Girl" on YouTube

"Pretty Girl" is a song by American singer and songwriter Maggie Lindemann. It is her first major-label single, and was released on September 30, 2016, through 300 Entertainment. The song was written by Lindemann, Sasha Sloan, and Sean Myer, with the production being handled by Jayson DeZuzio.

== Background ==
Lindemann said in an interview with Billboard's Braudie Blais-Billie:

"'Pretty Girl' is about being more than just what people see online and girls being more than our physical appearances. I think people need to look past just that and find what's deeper."

== Critical reception ==
Jeff Nelson of People said "in the defiant pop track, Lindemann, 18, blasts haters and affirms that she's more than her appearance" and called it an "infectious single". Idolator's Mike Wass stated that "Pretty Girl" is "something of a departure from her independent fare. The dark and gloomy sound of the 18-year-old's early material has given way to a more defiant and optimistic approach" and later claimed "I preferred the diva's dark-pop phase, but the song has an important message". Hugh McIntyre of Forbes called it "a catchy pop number" but later remarked that the song is "off to a fair start on streaming sites, but will she be able to break through and become a mainstream hitmaker? It wouldn't be out of the question for a social star to top the charts, so don't laugh off the possibility".

== Music video ==
A music video for the song, directed by Roman White, was released on March 9, 2017.

=== Background ===
In an interview with People, Lindemann said:

"'Pretty Girl' was inspired by my experiences growing up on social media and being constantly judged and underestimated based on the superficial, which is something I think a lot of girls are going through right now. Being on the set of 'Pretty Girl' with all of the amazing girls was so much fun, just hanging out and getting into trouble. We had a good time, and I think it shows, especially in the shots outside where we got to be a bit sassier."

== Track listing ==
Digital download
No.	Title	Length
1.	"Pretty Girl"	3:39

Digital download
No.	Title	Length
1.	"Pretty Girl" (YE remix)	3:06

Digital download
No.	Title	Length
1.	"Pretty Girl" (Taylor Wise remix)	3:50

Digital download
No.	Title	Length
1.	"Pretty Girl" (Cheat Codes x CADE remix)	3:13

== Charts ==
=== Weekly charts ===
Chart (2017)	Peak position
Australia (ARIA)	12
Austria (Ö3 Austria Top 40)	27
Belgium (Ultratip Bubbling Under Flanders)	6
Belgium (Ultratip Bubbling Under Wallonia)	21
Canada Hot 100 (Billboard)	71
Czech Republic Singles Digital (ČNS IFPI)	21
Denmark (Tracklisten)	13
Europe (Euro Digital Song Sales)	15
France (SNEP)	78
Germany (GfK)	25
Hungary (Single Top 40)	30
Ireland (IRMA)	6
Italy (FIMI)	40
Malaysia (RIM)	18
Mexico (Mexico Ingles Airplay)	9
Netherlands (Single Top 100)	16
New Zealand (Recorded Music NZ)	20
Norway (VG-lista)	8
Philippines (Philippine Hot 100)	27
Portugal (AFP)	57
Scottish Singles Sales (Official Charts)	2
Slovakia Singles Digital (ČNS IFPI)	29
Sweden (Sverigetopplistan)	4
Switzerland (Schweizer Hitparade)	42
UK Singles (Official Charts)	8

Cheat Codes x CADE Remix version
Chart (2017)	Peak position
Philippines (Philippine Hot 100)	63

=== Year-end charts ===
Chart (2017)	Position
Australia (ARIA)	60
Austria (Ö3 Austria Top 40)	62
Denmark (Tracklisten)	39
Germany (Official German Charts)	68
Hungary (Stream Top 40)	69
Netherlands (Single Top 100)	57
Sweden (Sverigetopplistan)	22
UK Singles (Official Charts Company)	28

== Certifications ==
Region	Certification	Certified units/sales
Australia (ARIA)	3× Platinum	210,000^{‡}
Denmark (IFPI Danmark)	2× Platinum	180,000^{‡}
France (SNEP)	Gold	66,666^{‡}
Germany (BVMI)	Platinum	400,000^{‡}
Italy (FIMI)	Platinum	50,000^{‡}
New Zealand (RMNZ)	3× Platinum	90,000^{‡}
Poland (ZPAV)	Gold	25,000^{‡}
Portugal (AFP)	Platinum	10,000^{‡}
Spain (Promusicae)	Gold	30,000^{‡}
United Kingdom (BPI)	2× Platinum	1,200,000^{‡}
United States (RIAA)	2× Platinum	2,000,000^{‡}
^{‡} Sales+streaming figures based on certification alone.

== Release history ==
Region	Date	Format	Version	Label	Ref.
Various	September 30, 2016	Digital download	Original	300	
Various	January 13, 2017	Digital download	(YE remix)	300	
United States	January 17, 2017	Top 40 radio	Original	300	
Various	February 10, 2017	Digital download	(Taylor Wise remix)	300	
Various	March 3, 2017	Digital download	(Cheat Codes x CADE remix)	300	
