= Spragga Benz =

Jamaican dancehall musician (born 1969)

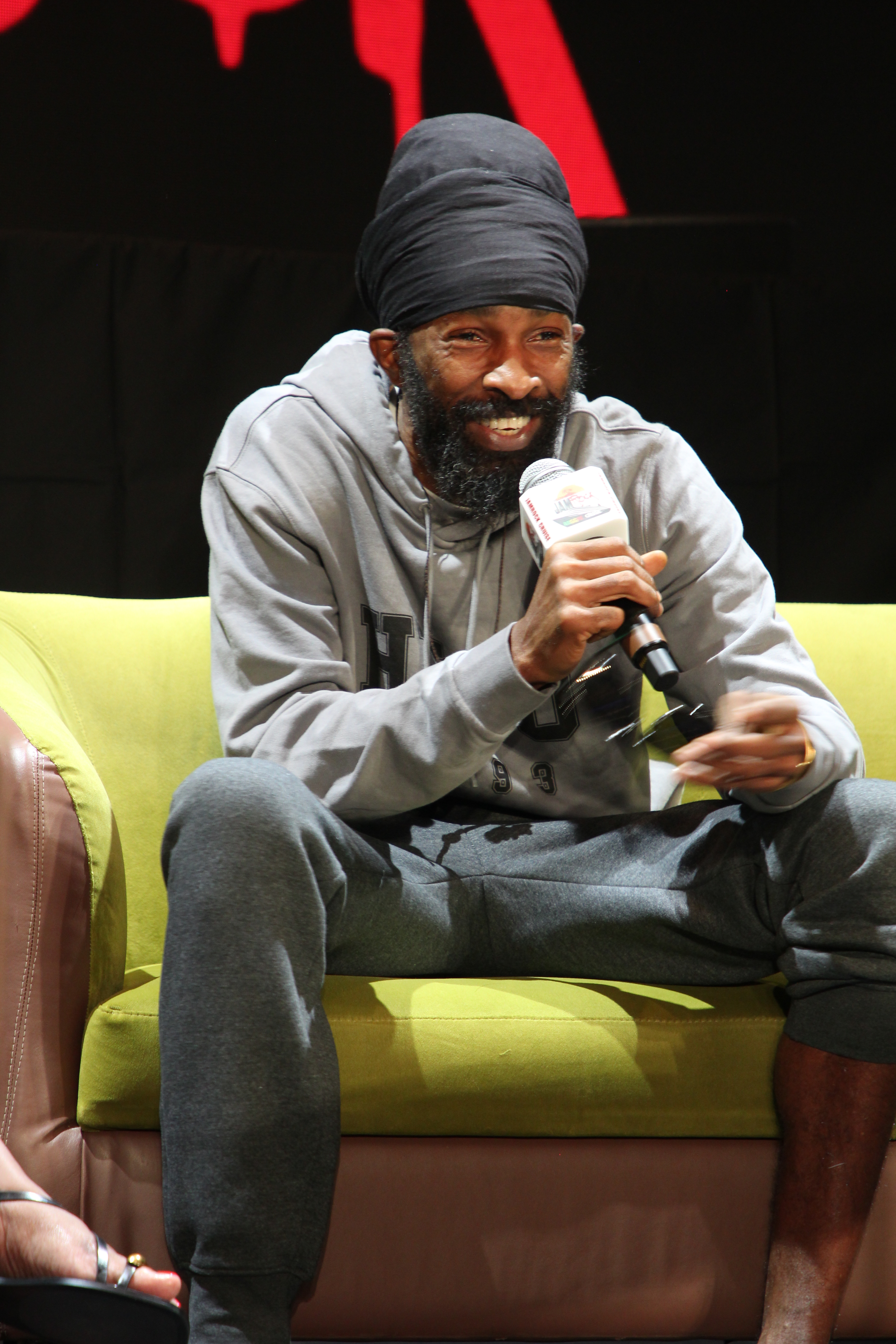
- Benz in 2025 on the JamRock Cruise

Background information
- Born: Carlton Errington Grant; 30 May 1969 (age 57); Kingston, Jamaica
- Genre: Dancehall
- Occupation: Deejay
- Years active: 1991–present
- Labels: VP; Capitol

Carlton Errington Grant (born 30 May 1969), better known by his stage name Spragga Benz, is a Jamaican dancehall singer.

== Career ==
He began his career around 1991. He was once known to his friends as "Spaghetti" (tall and slim), but this was later shortened to Spragga. The Benz in his name comes from the sound system for which he used to work for, L.A. Benz, and it is through this that he found his way into the music industry at a dubplate recording session with Buju Banton. The famed elder DJ was slated to do four tracks for L.A. Benz but only voiced two and suggested that Spragga do the other two. Since he was new to recording, he freestyled a couple of lines of what would then become, "Love Mi Gun", a popular tune.

He soon became an in-demand performer for numerous producers, including Bobby Digital, and hits followed with "Could a Deal" (produced by Winston Riley) and "Girls Hooray" (Steely & Clevie). A series of well-received singles followed, many included on his debut album, Jack It Up (1994). This success led to a deal with Capitol Records, who issued his second album, Uncommonly Smooth, in 1995, featuring duets with Chevelle Franklyn ("A-1 Lover") and "Spanish Harlem" (with Ben E. King). The album didn't sell well enough for Capitol, who dropped him, after which he spent a few years releasing further singles in Jamaica, also collaborating with the likes of Wyclef Jean and KRS-One. In 1999, he recorded a 'clash' album with Beenie Man, Two Badd DJs, and had a number one Jamaican hit single with "She Nuh Ready Yet (Hype Up)", which was also included on his third album, Fully Loaded (2000). This album featured duets with Lady Saw (on "Backshot") and Foxy Brown (on "Too Stoosh"), and was co-produced by house music legend Todd Terry. In the same year, Benz made his film acting debut in Brooklyn Babylon, and the following year played a leading role in the gangster film Shottas. 2002 saw the release of his fourth album, Thug Nature.

In 2003, Benz recorded a number of duets, with the likes of Carly Simon, Kevin Lyttle and Shannon, with the aim of breaking into the US market. In July 2007, Benz co-hosted the Urban Music Awards in New York with Foxy Brown. Benz was nominated for three awards at the first Caribbean Urban Music Awards, held in Jamaica in April 2008. On 31 August 2010 Spragga Benz released his sixth solo album Shotta Culture.

His 2019 album Chiliagon topped the Billboard Reggae Albums chart.

== Personal life ==
In the late 1990s, Benz founded the Stay in School program which provided help for needy students in his hometown of Franklin Town.

Carlton "Carlyle" Grant Jr., his 17-year-old son who had played a younger version of Benz's character in the film Shottas, was killed by local police in Kingston, Jamaica, on 23 August 2008. Police say they stopped two men on a bicycle in the Kingston 8 area, and when they approached them, one of the men began firing at them. The police said they returned fire and the men fled. When they searched the area they found Grant Jr. suffering from gunshot wounds and in possession of a .45 semi-automatic pistol. Grant Jr. was rushed to hospital where he was pronounced dead.

Following his son's death, Benz founded the Carlisle Foundation, with the aim of helping local youths.

== Discography ==
=== Albums ===
- Jack It Up (1994), VP
- Uncommonly Smooth (1995), Capitol
- Two Bad DJs with Beenie Man (1999)
- Fully Loaded (2000), VP
- Thug Nature (2002), Empire Musicwerks
- Live Good (2007)
- Shotta Culture (2010)
- Chiliagon (2019), Easy Star

=== Singles ===
- "Oh Yeah" feat. Foxy Brown - US R&B No. 63
- "A1 Lover"
- "Jack It Up"
- "Run Things"
- "Wi Nuh Like"
- "Y" feat. Carly Simon
- "Chicken Head Remix" feat. Wyclef Jean
- "She Nuh Ready Yet" / "Backshot" feat. Lady Saw
- "Mad House Tek Him"
- "No Way Remix"
- "Red Dot Special (Rha-Ta-Ta-Ta)"(featuring Swizz Beatz, Shabba Ranks and Kardinal Offishall)
- "Shotta Culture"
- "This Is the Way" feat. Nas
- "Eat Buddy" feat. Poizn Ivy
- "Hotter Dan Dem" (2012)
- "Nothin' But Love" feat. Black Pearl (2014), WonderSound Records
- "Pop It Off" and "Pop It Off REMIX" feat. Smoke DZA & Sierra Leone (2014), WonderSound Records

=== Notable appearances ===
- "Turn Me On", Kevin Lyttle feat. Spragga Benz - US No. 4, US R&B No. 20, UK No. 2, AUS No. 3, AUT No. 6, BEL No. 5, DEN No. 1, FRA No. 10, GER No. 2, GRE No. 2, ITA No. 3, NETH No. 2, NOR No. 2, SWE No. 5, SWI No. 3
- "Fire", Kelis feat. Spragga Benz
- "The Best Man", Kardinal Offishall feat. Spragga Benz and Darryl Riley
- "Gangsta Gal", Tanya Stephens feat. Spragga Benz
- "Iron Bars", Stephen Marley feat. Julian Marley and Spragga Benz
- "Working Ways", Stephen Marley feat. Spragga Benz (2011)
- "Lullabye", Toni Norville feat. Spragga Benz
- "Bounce with Me Remix", Lil Bow Wow feat. Spragga Benz
- "We Can", Alison Hinds feat. Spragga Benz (WI Cricket Theme Song, 2002)
- "Spanish Harlem" (feat. Ben E King) (uncommonly smooth 1995 capitol)
- "Another One Partner", Machel Montano feat. Spragga Benz, Red Rat and Buccaneer (Same High album)
- "Jealousy", video with Charles & Eddie, 1995
- "Don't Walk Away", Skull feat. Spragga Benz

== Filmography ==
- Shottas (Source Award Winner 2002) (as Wayne)
- Brooklyn Babylon (1999) (as himself)
- Unbelievable (2025) (as Christopher)
