= Maggie Lindemann =

American singer (born 1998)

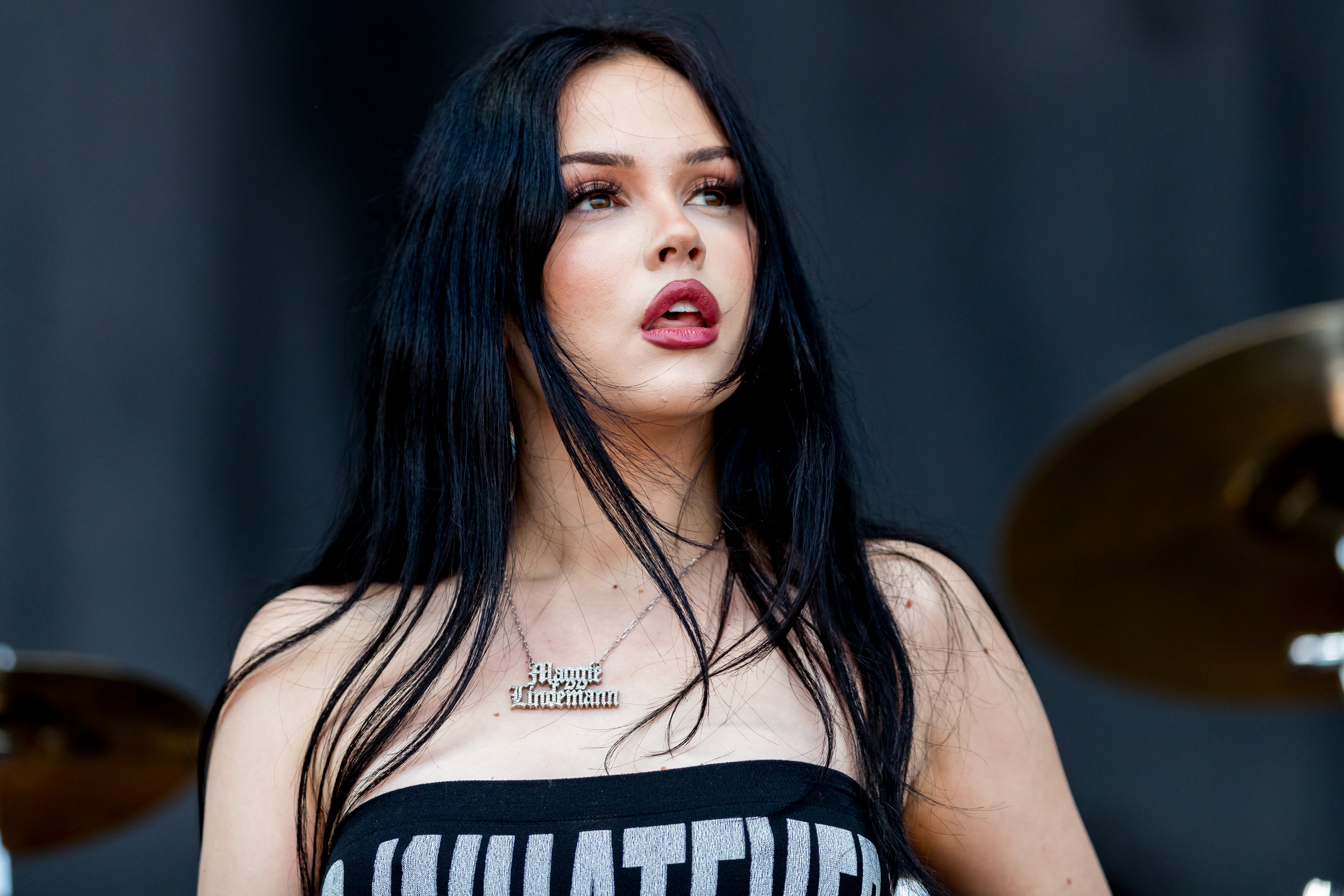
- Lindemann in 2023

Background information
- Born: Margaret Elizabeth Lindemann; July 21, 1998 (age 28); Dallas, Texas, U.S.
- Genres: Pop; rock
- Occupations: Singer; songwriter
- Years active: 2015–present
- Labels: Caroline; Swixxzaudio (current); 300; Atlantic (former)
- Website: maggielindemann.com

Margaret Elizabeth Lindemann (born July 21, 1998) is an American singer. She is best known for her 2016 breakout single "Pretty Girl", which peaked at number 4 in Sweden, number 6 in Ireland, and number 8 in the UK and the Netherlands. Following the song, Lindemann transitioned her music into a more alternative sound. She released her debut EP, Paranoia, in 2021, followed by her debut album, Suckerpunch, in 2022. Her second studio album, I Feel Everything, was released in 2025.

== Early life ==
Margaret Elizabeth Lindemann was born July 21, 1998, in Dallas, Texas, into a German-Scottish family. She began posting recordings of her singing on the social media apps Tumblr and Keek, gaining a following across these alongside her other social media accounts. Her career in music began after her manager, Gerald Tennison, discovered a video of her singing on her Instagram page. She then relocated to Los Angeles to pursue music.

== Career ==
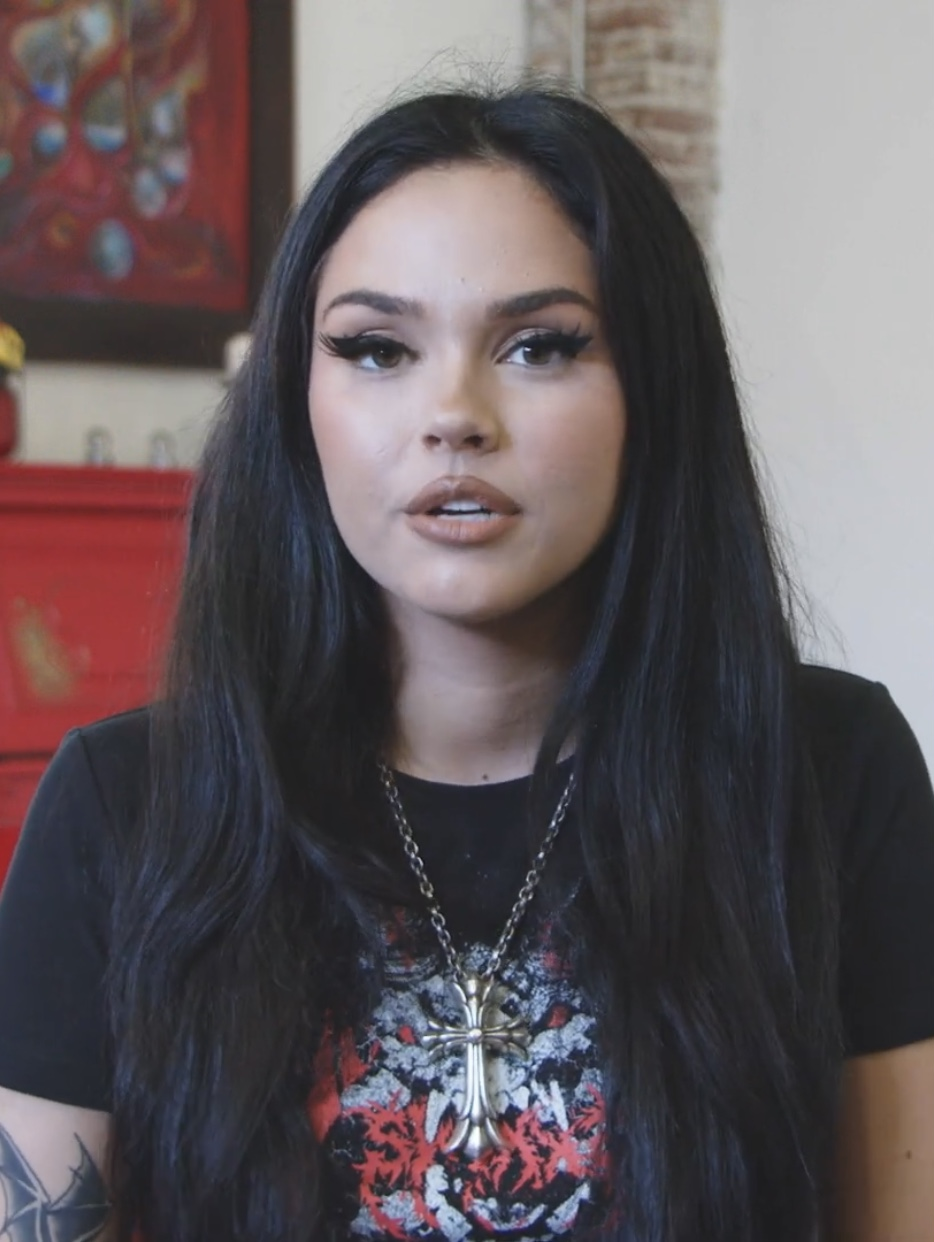
Lindemann in 2022

Lindemann's debut single "Knocking on Your Heart" was released in September 2015. Her second single "Couple of Kids" was released on October 30, 2015. On January 29, 2016, her third single "Things" was released. The official music video of "Things" was released on her YouTube channel on February 5, 2016.

On September 29, 2016, Lindemann released the single "Pretty Girl", her first single since signing to 300 Entertainment. The song peaked at number 4 on the Next Big Sound chart. Lindemann wrote the song to "show people that there's more to girls than just being pretty. We have so much to offer. People should get past the physical appearance to something deeper." The music video for "Pretty Girl" premiered through People on March 9, 2017. "Pretty Girl" is Lindemann's first song to ever chart on the US pop radio charts, peaking at number 50. It also peaked at number eight on the UK Singles Chart. Lindemann featured in the Vamps' single "Personal", released October 13, 2017. Lindemann released the single "Obsessed" on November 17, 2017. On October 26, 2018, she released the single "Human". She released the single "Would I" on November 16, 2018. In March 2019, Lindemann was the supporting act for Sabrina Carpenter on the North American leg of the Singular Tour, and has also opened for The Vamps, as well as Madison Beer on her Life Support Tour in 2021.

Lindemann released the single "Friends Go" on April 24, 2019. The song was later rereleased, featuring Travis Barker. Through 2020, she released four singles; "Knife Under My Pillow", "Gaslight!", "Scissorhands" and "Loner". All four of the songs, as well as four new songs, were included on Lindemann's debut EP, Paranoia, released on January 22, 2021. The EP and Lindemann herself received praise from Alternative Press, who acknowledged her "pop background" and appreciated Lindemann "blending genres and experimenting with rock and metal sounds", and credited her with "keeping emo alive". Lindemann says Avril Lavigne was a big influence on the EP, particularly on "Knife Under My Pillow".

Her song "Crash and Burn" was Radio.com's Alternative Pick of the Week from March 20–27, 2021, which landed Maggie Lindemann's first debut on Mediabase radio chart peaking at number 33. Lindemann hosts a podcast called "swixxzaudio", sharing the name of her record label which she founded in 2020. On the podcast, which currently has 10 episodes and began on April 20, 2020, she has discussed various topics such as the making and release of "Paranoia". She describes the podcast as her "speaking to anyone that wants to listen".

On April 15, 2022, she announced the second single from her upcoming debut album, Suckerpunch. The single, "How Could You Do This to Me", which follows the first single, "She Knows It", released in October 2021, features Kellin Quinn of Sleeping with Sirens and was released on April 29. It was performed live while Lindemann opened for Madison Beer on tour in 2021. The album's title was revealed the same day and released on September 16, 2022. The album's third single, "Break Me!" featuring Siiickbrain was released on June 3, 2022. On July 11, Lindemann announced the fourth single of the album, "You're Not Special", which released on July 15. On July 14, she announced Suckerpunch would be released on September 16. On August 12, the fifth single, "Self Sabotage" was released.

Lindemann explained the reason it took her 7 years to come out with her debut album, in which she struggled with constant disappointment in the work she was producing with her label. Along with her music, the singer-songwriter faced several obstacles from leaving her label to devising a new sound that strayed heavily from her bright and bubbly image. Lindemann states that her favorite songs on her sophomore project are "Self-Sabotage" and "Hear Me Out".

On September 16, 2022, she released her debut album Suckerpunch.

== Personal life ==
In 2016, Lindemann publicly came out as bisexual. Lindemann was in a relationship with Brandon Arreaga, a member of the boy band PrettyMuch, from 2019 to 2022. In May 2022, Lindemann shared via her Instagram stories that she and Arreaga had broken up. She confirmed to People in September of that year that she was in a relationship with NBA player Jordan Clarkson of the Utah Jazz. The couple broke up in early 2025.

In 2019, while performing in Malaysia, Lindemann was escorted off the stage and arrested for performing without a professional visit pass, as required by all foreigners performing work in the country. She was released on bail the next day, with the event organizers pleading guilty. She has described the incident as "five days of living hell". In 2022, Lindemann confirmed she underwent breast augmentation.

== Influences ==
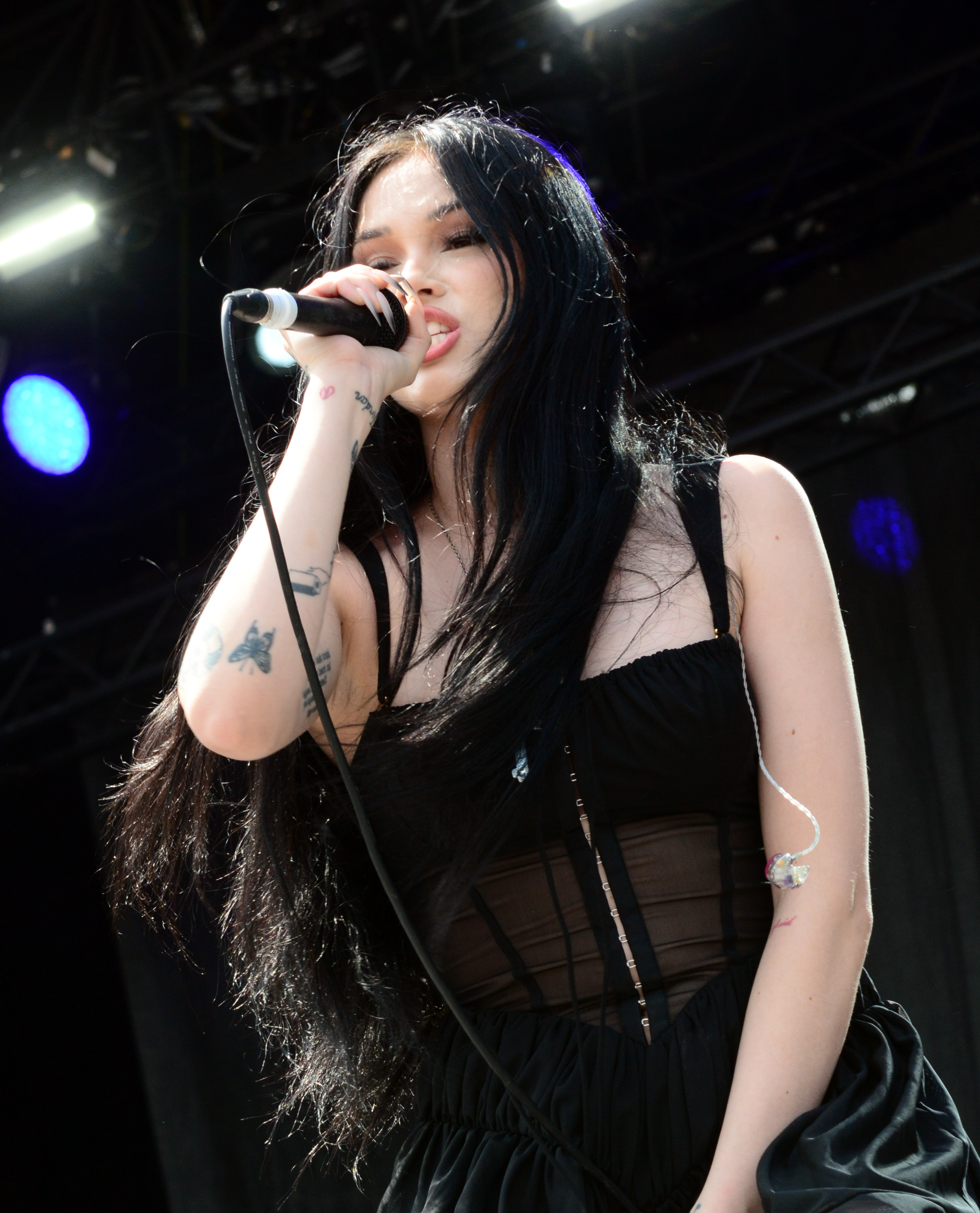
Lindemann performing at Rock im Park 2023

Lindemann credits Lana Del Rey, Banks, Spooky Black, and XXXTENTACION as some of her main influences, calling them "the 'anti pop stars'...off-kilter artists who do their individual thing and are unconcerned with being mainstream." She has credited rock and alternative acts of the early 2000s, such as Gwen Stefani, Avril Lavigne, Paramore, Evanescence and Flyleaf, as influences, saying, "That's actually my favorite time in music, but I felt like I had to hide that side of myself in order to fit this pop princess vibe." Lavigne particularly influenced Lindemann's song "Knife Under My Pillow" and "cages." Lindemann also cites Ariana Grande as one of her musical inspirations and "someone I've always looked up to".

== Discography ==
=== Studio albums ===
List of studio albums, with selected details
Title	Album details
Suckerpunch	Released: September 16, 2022; Label: Swixxzaudio; Formats: CD, digital download, LP, streaming
I Feel Everything	Released: October 17, 2025; Label: Swixxzaudio; Formats: CD, digital download, LP, streaming

=== Live albums ===
List of live albums, with selected details
Title	Album details
Maggie Lindemann Live in Los Angeles – Paranoia	Released: April 8, 2022; Label: Swixxzaudio; Format: LP

=== Extended plays ===
List of extended plays, with selected details
Title	EP details
Paranoia	Released: January 22, 2021; Label: Swixxzaudio; Formats: Cassette, CD, digital download, LP, streaming
Headsplit	Released: March 8, 2024; Label: Swixxzaudio; Formats: Cassette, CD, digital download, LP, streaming

=== Singles ===
==== As lead artist ====
List of singles as lead artist, showing year released, selected chart positions, certifications, and originating album
Title	Year	Peak chart positions											Certifications	Album
Title	Year	AUS	AUT	CAN	DEN	GER	IRL	NLD	NOR	SWE	SWI	UK	Certifications	Album
"Knocking on Your Heart"	2015	—	—	—	—	—	—	—	—	—	—	—		Non-album singles
"Couple of Kids"	2015	—	—	—	—	—	—	—	—	—	—	—		Non-album singles
"Things"	2016	—	—	—	—	—	—	—	—	—	—	—		Non-album singles
"Pretty Girl"	2016	12	27	71	13	25	6	16	8	4	42	8	RIAA: 2× Platinum; ARIA: 3× Platinum; BPI: 2× Platinum; IFPI DEN: Platinum	Non-album singles
"Obsessed"	2017	—	—	—	—	—	—	—	—	—	—	—		Non-album singles
"Human"	2018	—	—	—	—	—	—	—	—	—	—	—		Non-album singles
"Would I"	2018	—	—	—	—	—	—	—	—	—	—	—		Non-album singles
"Friends Go" (solo or with Travis Barker)	2019	—	—	—	—	—	—	—	—	—	—	—		Non-album singles
"Knife Under My Pillow"	2020	—	—	—	—	—	—	—	—	—	—	—		Paranoia
"Gaslight" (featuring Siiickbrain)	2020	—	—	—	—	—	—	—	—	—	—	—		Paranoia
"Scissorhands"	2020	—	—	—	—	—	—	—	—	—	—	—		Paranoia
"Loner"	2020	—	—	—	—	—	—	—	—	—	—	—		Paranoia
"Love Songs"	2021	—	—	—	—	—	—	—	—	—	—	—		Paranoia
"Different"	2021	—	—	—	—	—	—	—	—	—	—	—		Paranoia
"She Knows It"	2021	—	—	—	—	—	—	—	—	—	—	—		Suckerpunch
"Break Me!" (with Siiickbrain)	2022	—	—	—	—	—	—	—	—	—	—	—		Suckerpunch
"You're Not Special"	2022	—	—	—	—	—	—	—	—	—	—	—		Suckerpunch
"Cages"	2022	—	—	—	—	—	—	—	—	—	—	—		Suckerpunch
"Deprecating"	2023	—	—	—	—	—	—	—	—	—	—	—		Headsplit
"Hostage"	2024	—	—	—	—	—	—	—	—	—	—	—		Headsplit
"One of the Ones"	2025	—	—	—	—	—	—	—	—	—	—	—		I Feel Everything
"Spine"	2025	—	—	—	—	—	—	—	—	—	—	—		I Feel Everything
"Let Me Burn" (with The Warning)	2025	—	—	—	—	—	—	—	—	—	—	—		I Feel Everything
"—" denotes a single that did not chart or was not released.

==== As featured artist ====
List of singles as featured artist, showing year released, selected chart positions, certifications, and originating album
Title	Year	Peak chart positions	Certifications	Album
Title	Year	UK	Certifications	Album
"Personal" (The Vamps featuring Maggie Lindemann)	2017	76		Night & Day (Day Edition)
"Moon & Stars" (Snot featuring Maggie Lindemann)	2020	—	RIAA: Gold	Tragedy +
"OhMami" (Chase Atlantic featuring Maggie Lindemann)	2021	—		Non-album singles
"Debbie Downer" (Lølø featuring Maggie Lindemann)	2022	—		debbie downer

=== Promotional singles ===
List of promotional singles, showing year released and originating album
Title	Year	Album
"How Could You Do This To Me?" (with Kellin Quinn)	2022	Suckerpunch
"Self Sabotage"	2022	Suckerpunch

== Tours ==
Headlining

- Suckerpunch World Tour (2023)
- i feel everything Tour (2026)

Supporting

- The Vamps – Night & Day Tour (2018)
- Sabrina Carpenter – Singular Tour (2019)
- Madison Beer – Life Support Tour (2021)
- Pvris – UK Tour 2023 (2023)

== Filmography ==
Year	Title	Role	Ref.
2021	Downfalls High	Tiffany Lindy	
