= The Vamps discography =

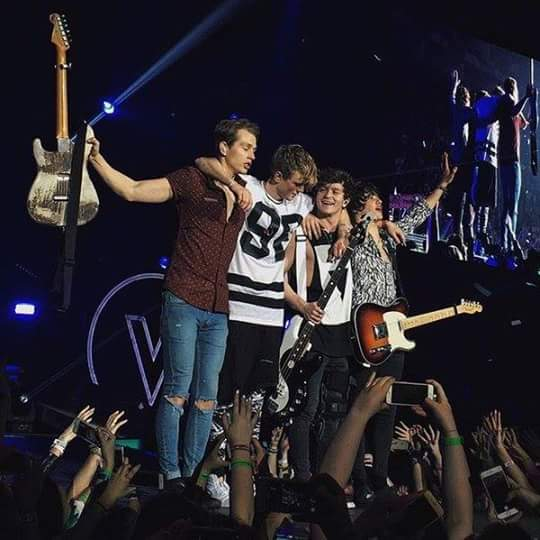
- The Vamps performing in 2016
- Studio albums: 5
- EPs: 18
- Singles: 25 (Note: This count includes the band's 3 singles as a featured artist. The Vamps has 22 singles as lead artist.)
- Video albums: 3
- Music videos: 18

The discography of British pop band the Vamps comprises five studio albums and twenty-three singles.

On 29 September 2013, the Vamps released their debut single "Can We Dance", which debuted at number two on the UK Singles Chart. Their second single "Wild Heart" was released on 18 January 2014 and peaked at number 3 on the UK Singles Chart. Their third single "Last Night" was released on 6 April 2014 and also reached number two. Their debut album Meet the Vamps was released on 15 April 2014. Their fourth international single "Somebody to You", featuring Demi Lovato", debuted at number four in the UK. Their debut EP Somebody to You entered the top 10 of the US Billboard 200. Their fifth single "Oh Cecilia", which previously appeared on the album, was released on 12 October 2014 featuring Shawn Mendes.

"Wake Up", released on 2 October 2015, was the first single from their second album. "Rest Your Love", released on 27 November 2015, was the second single from their second album. "I Found a Girl" was the third single. "Cheater" was released as the first countdown single from the album on 13 October 2015, with "Stolen Moments" following. On 27 November 2015 they released Wake Up, their second album.

On 14 July 2017, the Vamps released the first part of their concept album, Night & Day (Night Edition), with the second part, Night & Day (Day Edition), being released on 13 July 2018. These two parts form their third and fourth studio albums. The albums received mixed reviews.

The band celebrated their ten years in music in 2022 with the release of a fanzine titled Ten Years of the Vamps produced as a collaboration between band members and the fans and the 11-date 10 Years of the Vamps - The Greatest Hits Tour that travelled across the UK and Ireland in November and December 2022.

== Albums ==
=== Studio albums ===
List of studio albums, with selected chart positions and certifications
Title	Details	Peak chart positions										Certifications
Title	Details	UK	AUS	BEL (Fl)	FRA	IRE	JPN	NZ	SPA	SWI	US	Certifications
Meet the Vamps	Released: 15 April 2014; Label: Virgin EMI; Format: CD, digital download	2	3	34	29	2	34	8	9	70	40	BPI: Platinum
Wake Up	Released: 27 November 2015; Label: Virgin EMI; Format: CD, digital download	10	23	37	—	17	81	—	23	—	186	BPI: Gold
Night & Day (Night Edition)	Released: 14 July 2017; Label: Virgin EMI; Format: CD, LP, digital download	1	22	26	108	6	109	— (Note: Night & Day (Night Edition) did not enter the NZ Top 40 Albums Chart, but peaked at number three on the NZ Heatseeker Albums Chart.)	17	88	— (Note: Night & Day (Night Edition) reached number 87 on the US Billboard Top Current Albums, which only ranks recent releases. It never made the Billboard 200, which lists both current albums and catalog LPs.)	BPI: Gold
Night & Day (Day Edition)	Released: 13 July 2018; Label: Virgin EMI; Format: CD, LP, digital download	2	—	—	—	11	156	—	—	—	—	BPI: Gold
Cherry Blossom	Released: 16 October 2020; Label: EMI; Format: CD, LP, digital download	1	—	77	—	9	77	—	—	—	—	
"—" denotes a recording that did not chart or was not released in that territory.

=== Video albums ===
List of video albums
Title	Details
Story of the Vamps	Released: 22 April 2014; Label: Virgin EMI; Format: DVD+CD, digital download
Meet the Vamps: Live in Concert	Released: 1 December 2014; Label: Virgin EMI; Format: DVD, digital download
Access All Areas	Released: 8 December 2015; Label: Virgin EMI; Format: DVD, digital download

=== Compilation albums ===
List of compilation albums, with selected chart positions
Title	Details	Peak chart positions
Title	Details	UK
10 Years of The Vamps	Released: 14 October 2022; Label: Virgin EMI; Format: Digital download, CD	30

== Extended plays ==
List of extended plays, with selected chart positions
Title	Details	Peak
Title	Details	US
Can We Dance (Remixes)	Released: 2013; Label: Virgin EMI; Format: Digital download, streaming	—
Wild Heart	Released: 2014; Label: Virgin EMI; Format: Digital download, streaming	—
Somebody to You	Released: 18 May 2014; Label: Island; Format: CD, digital download	10
Live	Released: 4 September 2015; Label: Island; Format: Digital download	—
Wake Up	Released: 15 September 2015; Label: Virgin EMI; Format: Digital download, streaming	—
The Christmas EP	Released: 20 November 2015; Label: Virgin EMI; Format: Digital download	—
All Night	Released: 4 August 2017; Label: Virgin EMI; Format: Digital download	—
Night & Day (Extra Tracks)	Released: 4 August 2017; Label: Virgin EMI; Format: Digital download, streaming	—
Middle of the Night (The Vamps and Martin Jensen)	Released: 4 August 2017; Label: Virgin EMI; Format: Digital download, streaming	—
Night & Day (Day Edition: Extra Tracks)	Released: 27 July 2018; Label: Virgin EMI; Format: Digital download, streaming	—
Missing You	Released: 19 April 2019; Label: Virgin EMI; Format: Digital download	—
All The Lies (Remixes) (Alok, Felix Jaehn, and The Vamps)	Released: 19 July 2019; Label: Virgin EMI, Spinnin'; Format: Digital download, streaming	—
Collabs by Brad	Released: 12 August 2022; Label: Virgin EMI; Format: Digital download	—
Hidden Gems by James	Released: 26 August 2022; Label: Virgin EMI; Format: Digital download	—
Acoustic by Connor	Released: 9 September 2022; Label: Virgin EMI; Format: Digital download	—
Live by Tristan	Released: 23 September 2022; Label: Virgin EMI; Format: Digital download	—
10 Years of The Vamps – Chosen by You	Released: 25 November 2022; Label: UMG; Format: Streaming, digital download	—
Meet the Vamps (ReVamped)	Released: 20 September 2024; Format: Streaming, digital download	—
"—" denotes a recording that did not chart or was not released in that territory.

== Singles ==
=== As lead artist ===
List of singles, with selected chart positions and certifications
Title	Year	Peak chart positions									Certifications	Album
Title	Year	UK	AUS	BEL (Fl) Tip	FRA	IRE	JPN	NZ	SCO	US	Certifications	Album
"Can We Dance"	2013	2	17	—	—	21	36	19	2	—	BPI: Platinum; ARIA: Platinum; RMNZ: Platinum	Meet the Vamps
"Wild Heart"	2014	3	63	33	—	6	—	—	3	—	BPI: Silver	Meet the Vamps
"Last Night"	2014	2	37	—	—	12	—	—	2	—	BPI: Silver	Meet the Vamps
"Somebody to You" (featuring Demi Lovato)	2014	4	14	84	153	10	—	17	1	— (Note: "Somebody to You" did not enter the Billboard Hot 100, but peaked at number 10 on the Bubbling Under Hot 100 Singles chart.)	BPI: Platinum; ARIA: Platinum; RMNZ: 2× Platinum; RIAA: Gold	Meet the Vamps
"Oh Cecilia (Breaking My Heart)" (featuring Shawn Mendes)	2014	9	46	—	—	42	—	13	3	—	BPI: Gold; RMNZ: Gold	Meet the Vamps
"Wake Up"	2015	12	65	10	88	46	—	—	3	—		Wake Up
"Rest Your Love"	2015	—	—	—	—	—	—	—	—	—		Wake Up
"I Found a Girl" (featuring Omi)	2016	30	—	—	—	98	—	—	11	—	BPI: Silver	Wake Up
"All Night" (with Matoma)	2016	24	41	5	—	6	—	12	18	—	BPI: Platinum; ARIA: Gold; RMNZ: 3× Platinum	Night & Day (Night Edition)
"Middle of the Night" (with Martin Jensen)	2017	44	127	—	—	82	—	— (Note: "Middle of the Night" did not enter the NZ Top 40 Singles Chart, but peaked at number eight on the NZ Heatseeker Singles Chart.)	8	—	BPI: Silver; RMNZ: Gold	Night & Day (Night Edition)
"Hands" (with Mike Perry and Sabrina Carpenter)	2017	— (Note: "Hands" did not enter the UK Singles Chart, but peaked at number 58 on the UK Singles Download Chart and at number 59 on the UK Singles Sales Chart.)	—	—	—	—	—	—	—	—		Night & Day (Night Edition)
"Staying Up" (with Matoma)	2017	80	—	—	—	—	—	—	31	—		Non-album single
"Personal" (featuring Maggie Lindemann)	2017	76	—	—	—	—	—	—	45	—		Night & Day (Day Edition)
"Too Good to Be True" (with Danny Avila featuring Machine Gun Kelly)	2018	— (Note: "Too Good to Be True" did not enter the UK Singles Chart, but peaked at number 85 on the UK Singles Downloads Chart.)	—	—	—	—	—	—	59	—		Night & Day (Day Edition)
"Hair Too Long"	2018	— (Note: "Hair Too Long" did not enter the UK Singles Chart, but peaked at number 53 on the UK Singles Downloads Chart.)	—	—	—	—	—	—	31	—		Night & Day (Day Edition)
"Just My Type"	2018	— (Note: "Just My Type" did not enter the UK Singles Chart, but peaked at number 56 on the UK Singles Downloads Chart.)	—	—	—	—	—	—	45	—	BPI: Silver	Night & Day (Day Edition)
"We Don't Care" (with Sigala)	2018	— (Note: "We Don't Care" did not enter the UK Singles Chart, but peaked at number 99 on the UK Singles Downloads Chart.)	—	—	—	59	—	—	85	—		Brighter Days
"Right Now" (with Krept & Konan)	2019	—	—	—	—	—	—	—	—	—		Missing You
"Married in Vegas"	2020	— (Note: "Married in Vegas" did not enter the UK Singles Chart, but peaked at number 34 on the UK Singles Downloads Chart.)	—	—	—	—	—	—	25	—		Cherry Blossom
"Chemicals"	2020	—	—	—	—	—	—	—	—	—		Cherry Blossom
"Better"	2020	—	—	—	—	—	—	—	—	—		Cherry Blossom
"Seat at the Table"	2022	—	—	—	—	—	—	—	—	—		Non-album single
"—" denotes a recording that did not chart or was not released in that territory.

=== As featured artist ===
Title	Year	Peak chart positions	Album
Title	Year	SCO	Album
"Beliya" (Vishal Dadlani and Shekhar Ravjiani featuring the Vamps)	2016	—	Non-album single
"All the Lies" (Alok and Felix Jaehn featuring the Vamps)	2019	74	Breathe
"Another You" (Alok and Bloodline featuring the Vamps)	2021	—	Non-album single
"—" denotes a recording that did not chart or was not released in that territory.

=== Promotional singles ===
Title	Year	Album
"Dangerous"	2014	Meet the Vamps
"Hurricane"	2014	Alexander and the Terrible, Horrible, No Good, Very Bad Day
"Cheater"	2015	Wake Up
"Stolen Moments"	2015	Wake Up
"Kung Fu Fighting"	2016	Kung Fu Panda 3
"What Your Father Says (Live at Sofar Sounds, London)"	2018	Night & Day (Day Edition)
"Somebody to You (ReVamped)"	2024	Meet the Vamps (ReVamped)
"Last Night (ReVamped)"	2024	Meet the Vamps (ReVamped)
"Oh Cecilia (Breaking My Heart) (ReVamped)"	2024	Meet the Vamps (ReVamped)

== Other charted songs ==
Title	Year	Peak			Album
Title	Year	UK	SCO	NZ Hot	Album
"Fall"	2014	183	—	—	Meet the Vamps
"On the Floor"	2014	164	—	—	Meet the Vamps
"Missing You"	2019	—	36	38	Missing You
"—" denotes a recording that did not chart or was not released in that territory.

== Other appearances ==
Title	Year	Other artist	Album
"Counting Stars"	2014	R5	Live in London
"Nasty"	2014	Pixie Lott	Pixie Lott
"You Got It All"	2014	Union J	Non-album song

== Music videos ==
Title	Year	Director	Notes
"Can We Dance"	2013	Nick Bartleet	
"Wild Heart"	2014	Nick Bartleet	
"Last Night"	2014	Emil Nava	
"Nasty" (version 2)	2014	Dean Sherwood	Featured video; Pixie Lott's music video
"Counting Stars" (Live)	2014	Tim Wheeler	Featured video; R5's music video
"Somebody to You"	2014	Emil Nava	
"Oh Cecilia (Breaking My Heart)"	2014	Frank Borin	
"Hurricane"	2014	Emil Nava	
"I Wish It Could Be Christmas Everyday"	2014	Dean Sherwood	
"Wake Up"	2015	Frank Borin	
"Cheater"	2015	Dean Sherwood	
"Rest Your Love"	2015	Frank Borin	
"Kung Fu Fighting"	2016	Frank Borin	Features clips from Kung Fu Panda 3
"I Found a Girl"	2016	The Young Astronauts	
"Beliya"	2016	Dean Sherwood	
"All Night"	2016	Craig Moore	
"Middle of the night"	2017	Mike Baldwin	
"Staying Up"	2017	Craig Moore	Featured video; Matoma's video
"Personal"	2017	Frank Borin	
"Hair Too Long"	2018	Dean Sherwood	
"Just My Type"	2018	Declan Whitebloom	
"Too Good To Be True"	2018		Featured video; Danny Avila's video
"All The Lies"	2019		Featured video; Spinnin' Records video
"Married in Vegas"	2020		
"Better"	2020	Jordan Rossi	
"Would You"	2021	Dean Sherwood	
