= Four Corners Tour =

2019 concert tour by the Vamps

- Tour by The Vamps
- Start date: 27 April 2019
- End date: 1 June 2019
- Legs: 1
- No. of shows: 22

The Vamps concert chronology
- USA 2018 Tour (2018); Four Corners Tour (2019); The Vamps UK Tour (2021)

The Four Corners Tour was the tenth headlining concert tour by British pop rock band The Vamps. The tour began on 27 April 2019 in Plymouth and concluded on 1 June 2019 in Bournemouth.

== Background and development ==
On 6 July 2018 The Vamps announced they would be headlining a United Kingdom and Ireland tour, with New Hope Club and Hrvy joining the group as openers. Taylor Grey was also announced as an opening act on select dates. Additional dates in the UK, Europe and Asia were later added.

== Setlist ==
This setlist is representative of the show on 29 May 2019 in Dublin. It does not represent all the shows from the tour.

1. "Just My Type"
2. "Personal"
3. "Wild Heart"
4. "For You"
5. "All The Lies"
6. "We Don't Care"
7. "Drum Solo"
8. "Somebody to You"
9. "Waves"
10. "Middle of the Night"
11. "What Your Father Says"
12. "Right Now"
13. "Hair Too Long"
14. "Can We Dance"
15. "Wake Up"

Encore

16. "Cheater"
17. "Risk It All"
18. "Missing You"
19. "All Night"

== Tour dates ==
Date	City	Country	Venue	Opening act
Europe
27 April 2019	Plymouth	England	Plymouth Pavilions	New Hope Club
28 April 2019	Newport	England	Newport Centre	New Hope Club
30 April 2019	Swindon	England	Swindon Oasis	New Hope Club
1 May 2019	Nottingham	England	Nottingham Royal Concert Hall	New Hope Club
3 May 2019	Birmingham	England	Arena Birmingham	New Hope Club; HRVY
5 May 2019	Liverpool	England	M&S Bank Arena	New Hope Club; HRVY
7 May 2019	Sheffield	England	Sheffield City Hall	New Hope Club; Taylor Grey
8 May 2019	Newcastle	England	Newcastle City Hall	New Hope Club; Taylor Grey
10 May 2019	Aberdeen	Scotland	Aberdeen AECC	New Hope Club; HRVY
11 May 2019	Glasgow	Scotland	SSE Hydro	New Hope Club; HRVY
13 May 2019	Carlisle	England	Sands Centre	New Hope Club; Taylor Grey
15 May 2019	Hull	England	Hull Arena	New Hope Club; Taylor Grey
17 May 2019	Harrogate	England	Harrogate Convention Centre	New Hope Club; Taylor Grey
18 May 2019	Manchester	England	O2 Apollo Manchester	New Hope Club; Taylor Grey
20 May 2019	Leicester	England	De Montfort Hall	New Hope Club; Taylor Grey
22 May 2019	Norwich	England	University of East Anglia	New Hope Club; Taylor Grey
23 May 2019	Cambridge	England	Cambridge Corn Exchange	New Hope Club; Taylor Grey
25 May 2019	London	England	The O2 Arena	New Hope Club; HRVY
28 May 2019	Belfast	England	The SSE Arena	New Hope Club; HRVY
29 May 2019	Dublin	Ireland	3Arena	New Hope Club; HRVY
31 May 2019	Brighton	England	Brighton Centre	New Hope Club; HRVY
1 June 2019	Bournemouth	England	Bournemouth International Centre	New Hope Club; HRVY
3 June 2019	Douglas	Isle of Man	Villa Marina Royal Hall	New Hope Club
23 June 2019	Dumfries	Scotland	Youth Beatz Festival	
5 July 2019	Ampthill	England	Ampthill Great Park	
27 July 2019	Solihull	England	Tudor Grange Park	
