= Night & Day (The Vamps album) =

- Night Edition standard cover

Studio album by The Vamps
- Released: 14 July 2017 (Night Edition); 13 July 2018 (Day Edition)
- Recorded: 2016–2018
- Genre: Pop
- Length: 25:35 (Night Edition); 59:38 (Day Edition)
- Labels: Mercury; Virgin EMI
- Producers: Bradley Simpson; Jack & Coke; Danny Majic; DJ Frank E; Red Triangle; Matt Rad; Steve James; Chris Wallace; Martin Jensen; Matoma; Mikael Persson; Dimitri Vangelis; Andreas Wiman; Andrew Bolooki; Will Simms; Jacob Manson; Jordan Riley; Trackside; Kris Kross Amsterdam; Joren van der Voort; Captain Cuts; Digital Farm Animals; Sean Meier; OzGo; Oscar Holter; Space Primates

The Vamps chronology
Wake Up (2015)	Night & Day (2017)	Missing You (2019)

The Vamps studio album chronology
Wake Up (2015)	Night & Day (2017)	Cherry Blossom (2020)

Singles from Night & Day (Night Edition)
- 1. "All Night" Released: 14 October 2016; 2. "Middle of the Night" Released: 28 April 2017; 3. "Hands" Released: 19 May 2017

Singles from Night & Day (Day Edition)
- 1. "Personal" Released: 13 October 2017; 2. "Too Good to Be True" Released: 2 March 2018; 3. "Hair Too Long" Released: 20 April 2018; 4. "Just My Type" Released: 15 June 2018

Night & Day is the third studio album released by British pop rock band The Vamps, initially released as the Night Edition on 14 July 2017. Described as a concept album by the band, Night & Day was released in two parts, with the Day Edition following on 13 July 2018.

The Night Edition album was preceded by the release of the singles "All Night" and "Middle of the Night", and includes collaborations with Matoma, Martin Jensen, Mike Perry, Sabrina Carpenter and Joe Don Rooney. The album debuted at number one on the UK Albums Chart, making it the band's first number-one album.

On 13 July 2018, they released the second part of the album titled Night & Day (Day Edition). It debuted at number one on the Official Scottish Albums Chart and number two on the UK Albums Chart.

== Formats ==
On 3 May 2017, the band posted a video on their social media accounts detailing several formats of the Night Edition which were made available for pre-order from 5 May. The released versions include:

- standard digital edition which contains eight tracks
- deluxe digital edition which contains ten tracks plus videos from the Wake Up World Tour: Live at the O2 Arena live DVD
- "Brad Edition", which contains ten tracks plus a DVD of the Wake Up world tour and a poster of Brad
- "James Edition", which contains two exclusive tracks and a poster of James
- "Connor Edition", which contains two exclusive tracks and a poster of Connor
- "Tristan Edition", which contains two exclusive tracks and a poster of Tristan
- collector's bundle which contains all four versions of the album, all signed by each individual band member, plus a pre-sale code for the band's Night and Day Showcase tour
- vinyl version of the album which was released on 15 August 2017

The Day Edition was released on the same formats but with three exclusive tracks for each member instead of two.

== Tour ==
=== Night Edition ===
To support the album, the band undertook two tours. The first, the Middle of the Night Tour, took place in arenas across the United Kingdom and Ireland between April and May 2017. During the first show on 28 April, the album's title and release date of 14 July 2017 was officially confirmed. During the tour, the band performed "Hands", "Paper Hearts", "Shades On" and "Middle of the Night" live for the first time, as well as premiering a previously unreleased song, "Time is Not on Our Side", set to be released on the Day Edition. A second tour, known as the Night and Day Showcase, took place throughout the first two weeks of July, preceding the album's release. During the show, the band performed all ten songs from the standard edition of the album. Then, the Middle of the Night Tour visited South America, Oceania, Asia and Mexico between May and September 2017. During the show, the band performed most of the songs from the original setlist, with some changes like "Same to You" and "Sad Song" being added to the setlist, "It's a Lie" was also performed in Brazil and Argentina with Tini.

=== Day Edition ===
The band also took two tours to promote the album. The first, the Night & Day Tour, also took place in arenas across the United Kingdom and Ireland between April and May 2018. The band did a European tour between May and June 2018. During the tour, the band performed "Just My Type" and "Hair Too Long" live for the first time. Maggie Lindemann was a special guest during the UK leg where she performed "Personal" and "Pretty Girl" with the band. There was also a couple summer show that took place between July and September 2018 in Europe. The second part of the tour will start on 13 September 2018 in Mexico, then going through United States, then to South Korea, finishing in Buenos Aires, Argentina on 17 November 2018.

The second tour, the Four Corners Tour will go start on 27 April 2019 and end on 1 June. Their support acts are the British band New Hope Club and singer HRVY

== Singles ==
=== Night Edition ===
- "All Night", a collaboration with the Norwegian DJ Matoma, was released as the first single from the night edition on 14 October 2016. It peaked at number 24 on the UK Singles Chart and was certified gold in the country.
- "Middle of the Night", a collaboration with Danish DJ Martin Jensen, was released as the second single from the night edition on 28 April 2017. The song debuted at number 44 on the UK Singles Chart.
- "Hands", a collaboration with DJ Mike Perry and Sabrina Carpenter, was released as a single on 19 May 2017.

=== Day Edition ===
- "Staying Up", a second collaboration with Matoma, was originally released as the lead single on 31 August 2017. Despite being at #80 on the UK Singles Chart, "Staying Up" was later removed from the final tracklisting of the album.
- "Personal", a duet with singer-songwriter Maggie Lindemann, was released as the official lead single from the album on 13 October 2017. It peaked at #76 on UK Singles Chart.
- "Too Good to Be True", a collaboration with Danny Avila featuring Machine Gun Kelly, was released as the second single from the album on 2 March 2018.
- "Hair Too Long" was released as the third single from the album on 20 April 2018.
- "Just My Type" was released as the fourth single from the album on 15 June 2018.

== Track listing ==
=== Night Edition ===
Night & Day (Night Edition) – Standard
No.	Title	Writer(s)	Producer(s)	Length
1.	"Middle of the Night" (with Martin Jensen)	Christopher Wallace; Matthew Radosevich; Anders Christiansen; Edward Drewett; Steven James; Martin Jensen; Stephen Philibin	Matt Rad; James^{[a]}; Wallace^{[b]}; Jensen^{[b]}; Christiansen^{[b]}	2:56
2.	"All Night" (with Matoma)	Brad Simpson; James McVey; Connor Ball; Tristan Evans; Justin Franks; Daniel Majic; John Mitchell	DJ Frank E; Danny Majic; Matoma	3:17
3.	"Hands" (with Mike Perry and Sabrina Carpenter)	Ball; Evans; McVey; Simpson; Michael Perry; Samuel Preston; Rick Parkhouse; George Tizzard; Rachel Furner; Mikael Persson; Dimitri Vangelis; Andreas Wiman	Red Triangle; Persson; Vangelis; Wiman	2:46
4.	"Same to You"	Ball; Evans; McVey; Simpson; Svante Halldin; Jakob Hazell	Jack & Coke	3:35
5.	"Paper Hearts"	Ball; Evans; McVey; Simpson; Jacob Kasher Hindlin; Justin Tranter; Phillip Shaouy	Jack & Coke; Andrew Bolooki^{[a]}	3:30
6.	"Shades On"	Ball; Evans; McVey; Simpson; William Simms; Daniel Shah	Rad; Simms^{[b]}	3:06
7.	"It's a Lie" (featuring Tini)	Ball; Evans; McVey; Simpson	Simpson	3:14
8.	"Stay"	Ball; Evans; McVey; Simpson; Franks; Joseph O'Neill; Majic	The Vamps; Majic; DJ Frank E; Simpson^{[a]}	3:11
Total length:				25:35

Night & Day (Night Edition) – Digital and Brad Edition
No.	Title	Writer(s)	Producer(s)	Length
9.	"My Place"	Ball; Evans; McVey; Simpson; O'Neill	Evans; Simpson	3:33
10.	"Sad Song"	Ball; Evans; McVey; Simpson; Simms; Shah	Simms	3:18
Total length:				32:26

Night & Day (Night Edition) – James Edition
No.	Title	Writer(s)	Producer(s)	Length
9.	"I Love Loving You" (featuring Joe Don Rooney)	Ball; Evans; McVey; Simpson	McVey
10.	"Higher"	Ball; Evans; McVey; Simpson	McVey

Night & Day (Night Edition) – Connor Edition
No.	Title	Writer(s)	Producer(s)	Length
9.	"On My Way"	Ball; Evans; McVey; Simpson	Ball
10.	"Middle of the Night" (Rock Version; featuring Sainte)	Drewett; Radosevich; Wallace; James; Jensen; Christiansen; Philibin	Ball

Night & Day (Night Edition) – Tristan Edition
No.	Title	Writer(s)	Producer(s)	Length
9.	"Come Grind with Me"	Ball; Evans; McVey; Simpson	Simpson
10.	"All Around the World" (featuring Will Simms)	Ball; Evans; McVey; Simpson; Simms; Jon Maguire; Rick Parkhouse; Roy Stride; Michael Orabiyi	Simms; Mike 'Scribz' Riley

Night & Day (Night Edition) – DVD: Wake Up World Tour – Live from the O2
No.	Title	Length
1.	"Rest Your Love"	4:21
2.	"Cheater"	3:18
3.	"Somebody to You"	3:28
4.	"Medley: Kung Fu Fighting / Sorry / Stressed Out / Perfect / Can't Feel My Face / Stitches / Lean On^{[c]}"	6:54
5.	"Wild Heart"	3:50
6.	"Windmills"	2:58
7.	"Acoustic Medley: Written Off / Risk It All^{[d]}" (James & Connor duet)	4:01
8.	"Stay" (Brad Solo)	2:58
9.	"I Found a Girl" (with Conor Maynard)	3:25
10.	"Volcano"	4:45
11.	"Oh Cecilia (Breaking My Heart)" (with New Hope Club)	5:02
12.	"Last Night"	4:48
13.	"Can We Dance"	5:17
14.	"Stolen Moments"	6:40
15.	"Wake Up"	6:03
Total length:		60:54

Night & Day (Extra Tracks) – EP
No.	Title	Length
1.	"I Love Loving You" (featuring Joe Don Rooney)	3:20
2.	"Higher"	4:26
3.	"On My Way"	3:03
4.	"Middle of the Night" (Rock Version; featuring Sainte)	3:00
5.	"Come Grind with Me"	3:23
6.	"All Around the World" (featuring Will Simms)	3:26

=== Day Edition ===
Night & Day (Day Edition) – Standard
No.	Title	Writer(s)	Producer(s)	Length
1.	"Just My Type"	Ball; Evans; McVey; Simpson; Alexander James; Iain Farquharson; James Abrahart; Philip Plested; Jacob Manson; Tobias Tripp; Dale Anthoni	Manson	3:31
2.	"Hair Too Long"	Ball; Evans; McVey; Simpson	Jordan Riley	3:26
3.	"Talk Later"	Ball; Evans; McVey; Simpson; Richard Boardman; Pablo Bowman; Sarah Blanchard; Manson	Manson; Simpson	3:01
4.	"Too Good to Be True" (with Danny Avila featuring Machine Gun Kelly)	Bryn Christopher; Tizzard; Parkhouse; Plested; Colson Baker	Red Triangle	3:32
5.	"For You"	Ball; Evans; McVey; Simpson	Simpson	3:15
6.	"What Your Father Says"	Ball; Evans; McVey; Simpson; Benjamin Berger; Ryan McMahon; Ryan Rabin	Captain Cuts	3:24
7.	"Cheap Wine" (with Kris Kross Amsterdam)	Ball; Evans; McVey; Simpson; Jordy Huisman; Sander Huisman; Diederik van Elsas; Parrish Warrington; Joren van der Voort; Kiberley Anne Sutherland; Michael Aljadeff; Yannis Constantinou; Adrian Roye	Trackside; Kris Kross Amsterdam; van der Voort	3:00
8.	"Personal" (featuring Maggie Lindemann)	Ball; Evans; McVey; Simpson; Nicholas Gale; Preston; Tizzard; Parkhouse; Furner	Red Triangle; Digital Farm Animals^{[b]}; Sean Meier^{[b]}	3:13
9.	"Time Is Not on Our Side"	Oscar Gorres; Oscar Holter; Sean Douglas	OzGo; Holter	4:01
10.	"Pictures of Us"	Alexandra Hughes; Hazell; Halldin; Ammar Malik; Hindlin; Shaouy	Jack & Coke	3:38
11.	"Middle of the Night" (with Martin Jensen)	Wallace; Radosevich; Christiansen; Drewett; S. James; Jensen; Philibin	Rad; S. James^{[a]}; Wallace^{[b]}; Jensen^{[b]}; Christiansen^{[b]}	2:54
12.	"All Night" (with Matoma)	Ball; Evans; McVey; Simpson; Ball; Evans; Franks; Majic; Mitchell	DJ Frank E; Majic; Matoma	3:17
13.	"Hands" (with Mike Perry and Sabrina Carpenter)	Ball; Evans; McVey; Simpson; Perry; Preston; Parkhouse; Tizzard; Furner; Persson; Vangelis; Wiman	Red Triangle; Persson; Vangelis; Wiman	2:47
14.	"Same to You"	Ball; Evans; McVey; Simpson; Halldin; Hazell	Jack & Coke	3:34
15.	"Paper Hearts"	Ball; Evans; McVey; Simpson; Hindlin; Tranter; Shaouy	Jack & Coke; Andrew Bolooki^{[a]}	3:29
16.	"Shades On"	Ball; Evans; McVey; Simpson; Simms; Shah	Rad; Simms^{[a]}	3:06
17.	"It's a Lie" (featuring Tini)	Ball; Evans; McVey; Simpson	Simpson	3:13
18.	"Stay"	Ball; Evans; McVey; Simpson; Franks; O'Neill; Majic	The Vamps; DJ Frank E; Majic; Simpson^{[a]}	3:11
Total length:				59:38

Night & Day (Day Edition) – Brad Edition
No.	Title	Writer(s)	Length
8.	"If I Was Your Man"	Ball; Evans; McVey; Simpson	3:30
9.	"Kiss"	Ball; Evans; McVey; Simpson	3:20
10.	"Sometimes"	Ball; Evans; McVey; Simpson	3:38

Night & Day (Day Edition) – Connor Edition
No.	Title	Writer(s)	Length
8.	"Black & Blue"	Ball; Evans; McVey; Simpson; Joe Scoltock	3:16
9.	"Naked"	Ball; Evans; McVey; Simpson	3:36
10.	"Shivers"	Ball; Evans; McVey; Simpson	3:03

Night & Day (Day Edition) – Tristan Edition
No.	Title	Writer(s)	Length
8.	"My Life" (featuring New Hope Club)	Ball; Evans; McVey; Simpson; Shah; Blake Richardson; George Smith; Reece Bibby	3:25
9.	"Juicy Fruit" (featuring Silentó)	Ball; Evans; McVey; Simpson; Ricky Hawk	3:50
10.	"Sometimes it Rains in LA"	Ball; Evans; McVey; Simpson; Nathan Cunningham; Nick Hodgson; Marc Sibley; Joe O'Neill	3:21

Night & Day (Day Edition) – James Edition
No.	Title	Writer(s)	Length
8.	"On Your Mind"	Ball; Evans; McVey; Simpson	3:33
9.	"Stumble Home" (featuring Lindsay Ell)	Ball; Evans; McVey; Simpson; Lindsay Ell	3:31
10.	"Tequila"	Dan Smyers; Nicolle Galyon; Jordan Reynolds	3:05

Night & Day (Day Edition) – DVD: Middle of the Night Tour – Live from the O2
No.	Title	Length
1.	"Intro"
2.	"Wake Up"
3.	"Wild Heart"
4.	"Hands" (with Sabrina Carpenter)
5.	"Somebody to You" (with Sabrina Carpenter)
6.	"Platinum Album Presentation"
7.	"Paper Hearts"
8.	"Oh Cecilia (Breaking My Heart)"
9.	"Shades On"
10.	"Time Is Not on Our Side"
11.	"Middle of the Night"
12.	"Risk It All"
13.	"Last Night"
14.	"Can We Dance"
15.	"Rest Your Love"
16.	"All Night"
17.	"End Credits"

Night & Day (Day Edition) – Japan bonus tracks
No.	Title	Writer(s)	Producer(s)	Length
19.	"If I Was Your Man"	Ball; Evans; McVey; Simpson	Simpson	3:30
20.	"Black & Blue"	Ball; Evans; McVey; Simpson	Simpson	3:16
21.	"Sometimes it Rains in LA"	O'Neill; Marc Sibley; Nathan Cunningham; Nicholas Hudgson	Space Primates	3:21
22.	"On Your Mind"	Ball; Evans; McVey; Simpson; Gorres	Simpson	3:33
Total length:				73:22

Night & Day (Day Edition: Extra Tracks) – EP
No.	Title	Length
1.	"If I Was Your Man"	3:30
2.	"Kiss"	3:20
3.	"Sometimes"	3:38
4.	"Black and Blue"	3:16
5.	"Naked"	3:36
6.	"Shivers"	3:03
7.	"My Life" (with New Hope Club)	3:25
8.	"Juicy Fruit" (featuring Silentó)	3:50
9.	"Sometimes It Rains in L.A."	3:21
10.	"On Your Mind"	3:33
11.	"Stumble Home" (featuring Lindsay Ell)	3:31
12.	"Tequila"	3:05

Notes

- ^a Signifies a co-producer
- ^b Signifies an additional producer
- ^c Not included on the digital version
- ^d Separated into different tracks on the digital version

== Charts ==
=== Night Edition (2017) ===
Chart (2017)	Peak position
Australian Albums (ARIA)	22
Austrian Albums (Ö3 Austria)	40
Belgian Albums (Ultratop Flanders)	26
Belgian Albums (Ultratop Wallonia)	75
Dutch Albums (Album Top 100)	39
French Albums (SNEP)	108
German Albums (Offizielle Top 100)	85
Irish Albums (IRMA)	6
Italian Albums (FIMI)	74
Japanese Albums (Oricon)	109
New Zealand Heatseeker Albums (RMNZ)	3
Polish Albums (ZPAV)	15
Scottish Albums (Official Charts)	1
Spanish Albums (Promusicae)	17
Swiss Albums (Schweizer Hitparade)	88
UK Albums (Official Charts)	1

=== Day Edition (2018) ===
Chart (2018)	Peak position
Irish Albums (IRMA)	11
Scottish Albums (Official Charts)	1
UK Albums (Official Charts)	2

=== Year-end charts ===
Chart (2018)	Position
UK Albums (OCC)	95

== Certifications ==
Region	Certification	Certified units/sales
New Zealand (RMNZ)	Gold	7,500^{‡}
Singapore (RIAS)	Gold	5,000^{*}
United Kingdom (BPI)	Gold	100,000^{‡}
^{*} Sales figures based on certification alone.^{‡} Sales+streaming figures based on certification alone.
