= Would You =

Would You may refer to:

- "Would You?", song by Bing Crosby from the 1946 film Road to Utopia
- "Would You?" (Iris song), 2012
- "Would You...?", a 1998 song by Touch and Go
- "Would You", a song by the Vamps from their 2020 album Cherry Blossom
- "Would You?", a short story by Poppy Z. Brite
