= List of events at the O2 Arena =

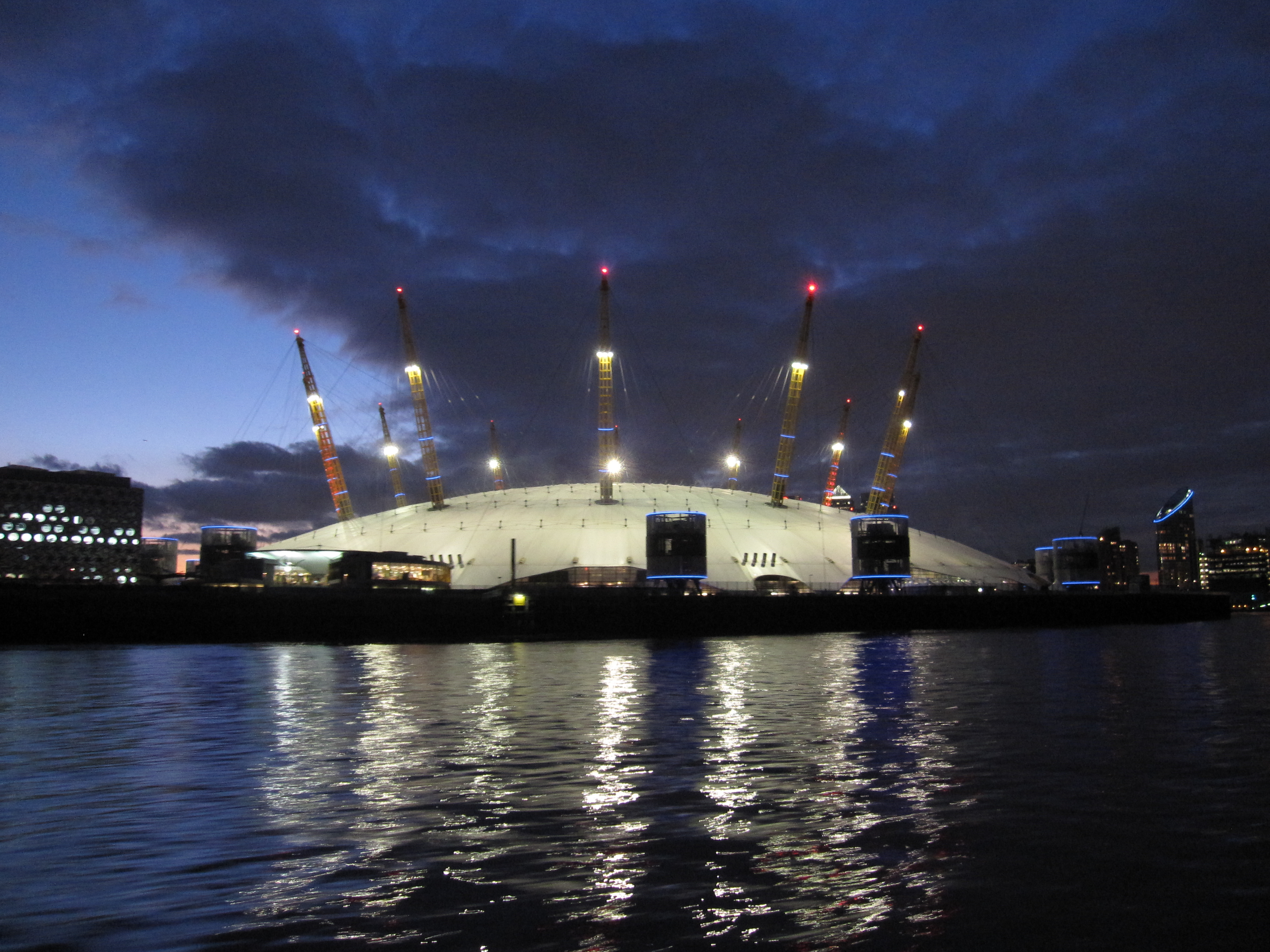

The O2 Arena, Greenwich, London, has hosted some of the best known performers, comedy acts and sports teams from around the world. Since 2010, the O2 has hosted over 2000 events from various sporting events to world famous artists. Some of the events that have been held there are listed below.

== Entertainment events ==
=== Concert tours ===
Cancelled events

List of concerts held at the O2 Arena
Year	Date	Artist	Tour	Notes
2007	4-5 July, 7-8 July, 10 July	Justin Timberlake	FutureSex/LoveShow	
2007	10 December	Led Zeppelin	Ahmet Ertegun Tribute Concert	A reunion show of the original band members and Jason Bonham on drums
2007	15-16 December, 18 December	Spice Girls	The Return of the Spice Girls Tour	
2007	1 August, 3-4 August, 7 August, 10-11 August, 14 August, 17-18 August, 24-25 August, 28 August, 31 August; 1 September, 6 September, 9 September, 12-13 September, 16 September, 20-21 September	Prince	The Earth Tour: 21 Nights in London	The set list changed every night, so no two shows would be the same.
2008	2-4 January, 6 January, 8-9 January, 11-13 January, 15-16 January, 18 January, 20 January, 22 January	Spice Girls	The Return of the Spice Girls Tour	
2009	3 June, 4 June, 6 June, 7 June, 10 June, 11 June, 12 June, 13 June	Britney Spears	The Circus Starring Britney Spears	The rush for these London residency tickets resulted in over 100,000 tickets being sold in just one week.
2009-2010	13 July - 6 March	Michael Jackson	This Is It	Cancelled, due to Jackson's death on 25 June.
2011	25-26, 28-29, 30 June	Glee	Glee Live! In Concert!	
2011	27-28 October	Britney Spears	Femme Fatale Tour	During her Femme Fatale Tour stop at The O2 Arena in London, pop star Joe Jonas served as her special opening act
2012	26-27 March	Drake	Club Paradise Tour	
2012	22 October	Jennifer Lopez	Dance Again World Tour	
2013	23-24 February, 1-2 April, 4-6 April	One Direction	Take Me Home Tour	
2014	24-26 March	Drake	Would You Like a Tour?	
2014	1-2 April, 10 June	Justin Timberlake	The 20/20 Experience World Tour	
2014	28 November	Enrique Iglesias	Sex and Love Tour	
2016	24-25 March	Ellie Goulding	Delirium World Tour	
2017	January 30, 1-2, 4-5, 14-15 February, 20 March	Drake	Boy Meets World Tour	
2017	26-27 May	Ariana Grande	Dangerous Woman Tour	Cancelled, due to the Manchester Arena bombing on 22 May.
2017	3 July	Linkin Park	One More Light World Tour	Last tour with original frontman Chester Bennington due to his death on 20 July.
2018	9 July, 11 July	Justin Timberlake	The Man of the Woods Tour	
2018	24-26 August	Britney Spears	Piece of Me Tour	Britney's Last UK Tour before Retirement.
2019	1-2, 4-5, 8-9, 11 April	Drake	Assassination Vacation Tour	
2019	25 May	The Vamps	Four Corners Tour	First artists to headline the O2 Arena 5 years in a row.
2019	8 June	Tame Impala	World Tour 2019	
2019	17 August, 19-20 August; 15-16 October	Ariana Grande	Sweetener World Tour	
2019	30 November	JoJo Siwa	D.R.E.A.M. The Tour.	The youngest person to perform in the O2 Arena at the age of 16.
2020	2 February	Jonas Brothers	Happiness Begins Tour	
2020	21-22 February	The 1975	NOACF Tour	
2022	26 April	Blondie	Against The Odds Tour	
2022	14 May	Little Mix	The Confetti Tour	The group's last show before their indefinite hiatus.
2022	12 August	Diljit Dosanjh	Born to Shine World Tour	
2023	14-16, 20 February, 19-20 March	Chris Brown	Under the Influence Tour	
2023	22 February	ATEEZ	The Fellowship: Break The Wall	
2023	15-16 March	Lizzo	The Special Tour	
2023	16 June	Tenacious D	The Spicy Meatball Tour	Recorded for The Complete Master Works 3
2023	7-8 September	TWICE	Ready to Be World Tour	
2023	28 September	Aespa	Synk: Hyper Line	
2023	14-15 October, 17-18 October	Madonna	The Celebration Tour	
2023	22 October	Terence Lam	L*underground	
2023	27-28 October	S Club	The Good Times Tour	
2023	11 November	50 Cent	The Final Lap Tour	with Busta Rhymes and guest appearance by Ed Sheeran
2023	17 November	Louis Tomlinson	Faith in the Future World Tour	
2023	28 November	Mayday	Fly to 2023 European Tour	
2024	9-10 January	Jay Chou	Carnival World Tour	
2024	10 May	Keane	Keane20 world tour	
2024	14-15 May, 17-18 May	Olivia Rodrigo	GUTS World Tour	
2024	16 June	IVE	Show What I Have World Tour	
2024	4-5 July, 7-8 July, 10-11 July	The Killers	Rebel Diamonds Tour	
2024	11-12 August	Justin Timberlake	The Forget Tomorrow World Tour	
2024	13-14 September	Jonas Brothers	Five Albums. One Night. The World Tour	
2024	24 September	Linkin Park	From Zero World Tour	With new front-woman Emily Armstrong
2024	4-5 October, 18 October	Diljit Dosanjh	Dil Luminati Tour	
2024	28 November	Charli xcx	Brat Tour	With special guests Caroline Polachek, Robyn, Yung Lean and Shygirl
2025	27-28 January	ATEEZ	Towards The Light: Will To Power	
2025	29 January	Kehlani	Crash World Tour	
2025	14 February	Zhou Shen	9.29 Hz 10th Anniversary Concert Tour	Cancelled due to illness.
2025	21 February	Pitbull	Party After Dark Tour	
2025	6 March	Gracie Abrams	The Secret of Us Tour	
2025	8-9 March	Sabrina Carpenter	Short n' Sweet Tour	
2025	11 March	JJ Lin	JJ20 Final Lap World Tour	
2025	25 March	Tomorrow X Together	Act: Promise	
2025	29 March; 1-2 April, 5-6 April, 8-9 April, 11 April	Usher	Usher: Past Present Future World Tour	
2025	13-14 May	Twenty One Pilots	The Clancy World Tour	
2025	19 May, 21-22 May	Tyler, the Creator	Chromakopia: The World Tour	
2025	20 May; 24 June	Tate McRae	Miss Possessive Tour	
2025	26-27 May; 2 June, 3 June	Kylie Minogue	Tension Tour	
2025	30 May	BABYMETAL	BABYMETAL World Tour	
2025	19 June	Ado	Hibana World Tour	
2025	10-11 July, 13-14 July, 16-17 July	Billie Eilish	Hit Me Hard and Soft: The Tour	
2025	25 July	Judas Priest with Alice Cooper	Invincible Shield Tour	
2025	22 August	ENHYPEN	Walk The Line Tour	
2025	3-5 November	Benson Boone	American Heart Tour	
2025	02-03 December	Wolf Alice	The Clearing Tour	
2025	4 December	Sabaton	The Legendary Tour	
2026	5 March	MGK	Lost Americana Tour	
2026	2 April	5 Seconds of Summer	Everyone's a Star! World Tour	
2026	3 May	How Did We Get Here? World Tour	Louis Tomlinson	
2026	5-6 May	Rosalía	Lux Tour	
2026	7 May	Tame Impala	Deadbeat Tour	
2026	30 May	Madison Beer	The Locket Tour	
2026	3-4 June	TWICE	This Is For World Tour	
2026	15-16 August, 19-20 August, 23-24 August, 27-28 August, 31 August, 1 September	Ariana Grande	The Eternal Sunshine Tour	
2026	12 November	Hatsune Miku	Miku Expo Europe 2026	

=== Music festivals ===
Since March 2013, the arena has hosted C2C: Country to Country, Europe's largest country music festival, which annually attracts over 20,000 fans. UK and Irish acts, as well as up-and-coming American acts, perform sets several times across various pop-up stages in and around the arena, with the main stage accessible only to ticket-holders. The seventh C2C was held on 8–10 March 2019.

=== Comedy ===
In May 2008, Chris Rock became the first comedian to play the arena, breaking a Guinness World Record for the largest audience for a comedy show, though this was never an official record and has since been broken by German comedian Mario Barth. Lee Evans, Steve Coogan and The Mighty Boosh all appeared at the arena in 2008, followed by Canadian stand-up Russell Peters in February 2009. High-profile stand-ups Al Murray, Eddie Izzard and Michael McIntyre have all performed in 2009. Russell Brand performed at the O2 Arena in April 2009; as well as performing stand-up comedy, he recorded several scenes for his new movie Get Him to the Greek, using the audience for his stand-up as a live crowd for a rock concert.

On 30 March 2010, the O2 Arena hosted Channel 4's Comedy Gala, a stand-up comedy benefit show in aid of Great Ormond Street Children's Hospital, in front of 14,000. With over 25 comedians appearing, organiser Channel 4 billed it as "the biggest live stand up show in United Kingdom history".

Some of the UK's most successful comedians are now performing at the O2 Arena during their stand-up tours such as Russell Howard who performed there in his 2011 tour "Right Here, Right Now". Jerry Seinfeld performed a one night only stand-up show at the O2 Arena in 2011. Alan Carr performed his tour "Spexy Beast" in late 2011. Louis C.K. performed there on 20 March 2013.

On 21 November 2013, the five surviving members of Monty Python announced that they would perform a one off reunion show at the arena on 1 July 2014. Another 9 dates were added after the first show sold out in 43 seconds.

Peter Kay started a 29 show residency at the arena with a show on 16 December 2022, with a show scheduled every month until July 2025. Combined with his previous tour, Kay will have performed at the arena 44 times, which will set a new record previously held by Take That (34 performances).

=== Other ===
On 26 October 2026, as part of the Echoes of Exandria tour, Critical Role will film an actual play live show where they play Dungeons & Dragons. Their last show in London, titled The Mighty Nein Reunion: Echoes of the Solstice, occurred at the OVO Arena Wembley in October 2023.

== Sports events ==
=== Tennis ===
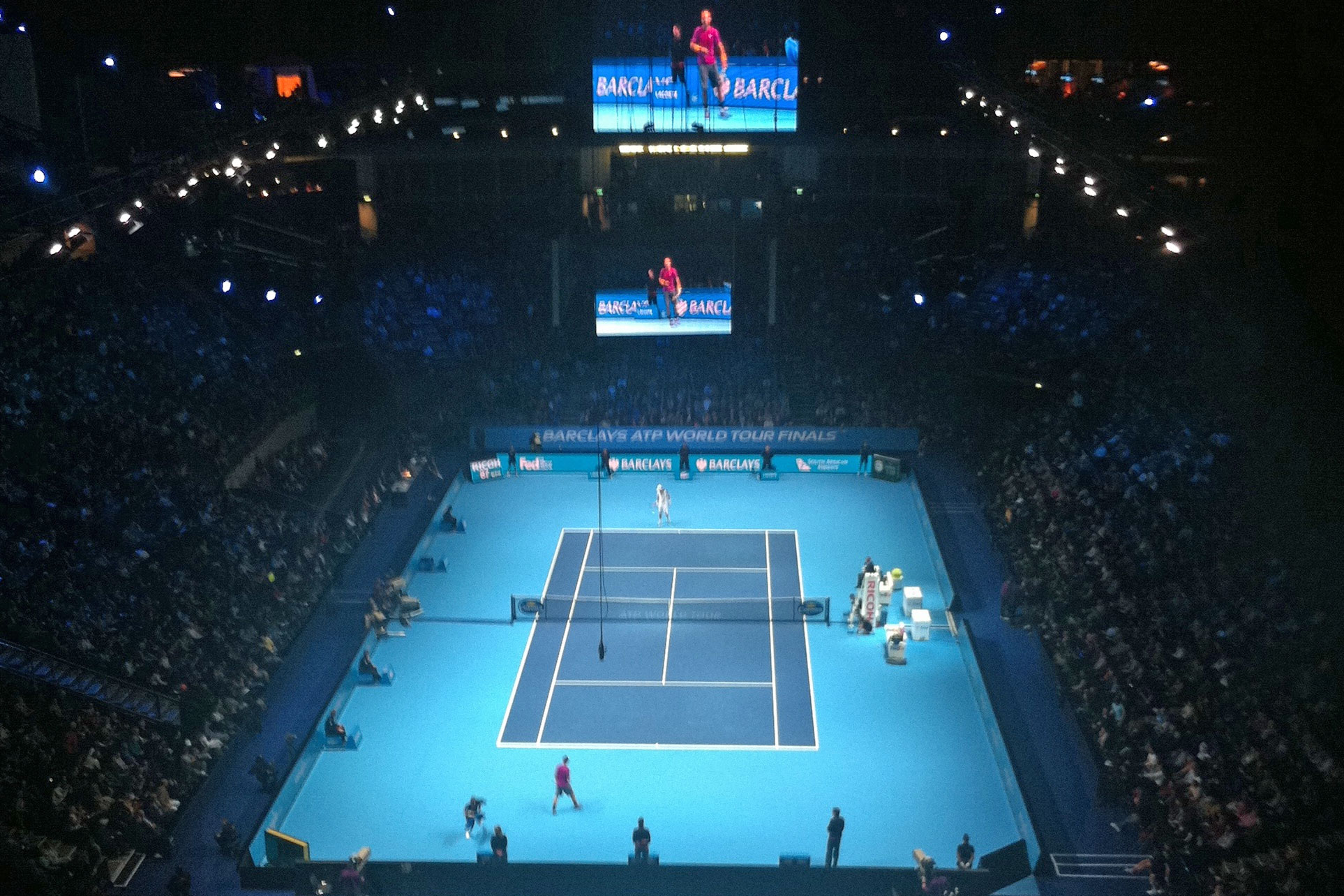
Rafael Nadal against Andy Roddick in the 2010 ATP World Tour Finals

The arena hosted the first ever Turbo Tennis Tournament on 15 September 2007 which was won by Andy Murray. From 2009 until 2020 it was selected as the venue for the ATP World Tour Finals. The venue hosted the 2022 edition of the Laver Cup where Roger Federer played his final match before retiring.

=== Ice hockey ===
The arena has also hosted two National Hockey League contests, which started the 2007–08 NHL season, on 29 and 30 September, both involving the Anschutz-owned Los Angeles Kings and their regional rivals from Southern California, the Anaheim Ducks.

=== Basketball ===
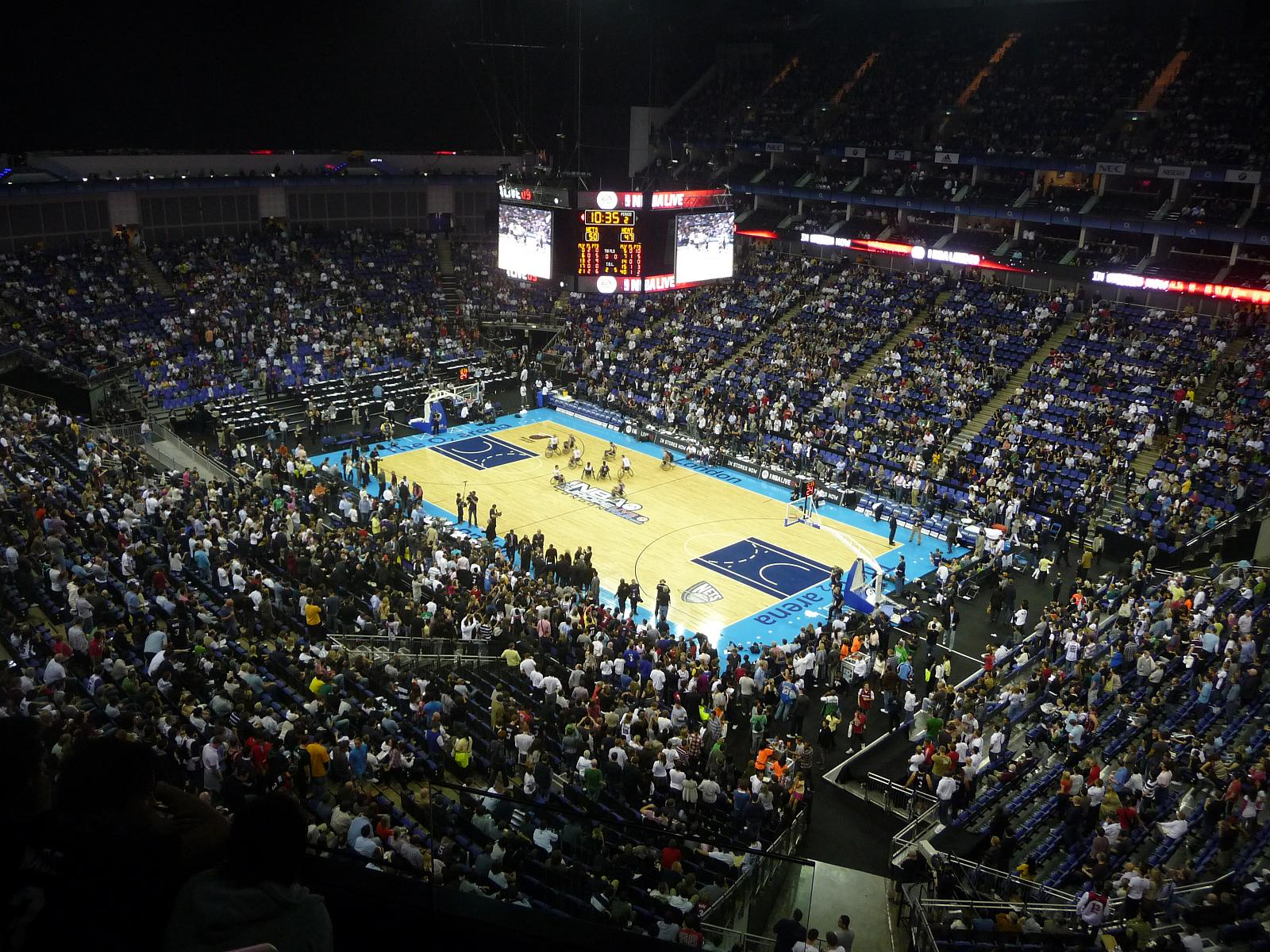
New Jersey Nets v Miami Heat NBA game

An NBA exhibition match between the Boston Celtics and the Minnesota Timberwolves took place at the arena on 10 October 2007. The game sold out more than three months beforehand. The arena also hosted the Miami Heat and New Jersey Nets (NBA) pre-season games before the 2008–09 season. Just like the previous NBA exhibition game, tickets for the game sold out three months beforehand.

The Chicago Bulls and the Utah Jazz played an exhibition match on 6 October 2009 in London as part of NBA Europe Live. The Chicago Bulls won the match 102–101 in front of a sell-out crowd.

On 4 October 2010, The Los Angeles Lakers took on the Minnesota Timberwolves. The Timberwolves won the game 111–92 in front of a crowd of 18,689.

The New Jersey Nets defeated the Toronto Raptors on 4 March 2011, by a score of 116–103. The teams met again on 5 March 2011, with a New Jersey Nets victory in 3 overtimes, 137–136. 4 March marked the first time an NBA regular season game has taken place at the O2 Arena.

The Great Britain National Basketball Team have also played several games there, with an attendance of 7,244 for the win over the Czech Republic qualification match for EuroBasket 2009. It is expected this will soon become a home arena for the National Side.

The arena hosted the knockout stage of the men's and women's basketball tournaments during the 2012 Summer Olympics.

A 2012–13 NBA season game took place at the O2 Arena between the Detroit Pistons and the New York Knicks on 17 January 2013. The Knicks won the match 102–87.

A 2014–15 NBA season game took place at the O2 Arena between the Milwaukee Bucks and the New York Knicks on 15 January 2015. The Bucks won the match 95–79.

The arena hosted the 2013 Euroleague Final Four.

In December 2022, the arena hosted a college basketball game between the Michigan Wolverines and Kentucky Wildcats.

=== Gymnastics ===
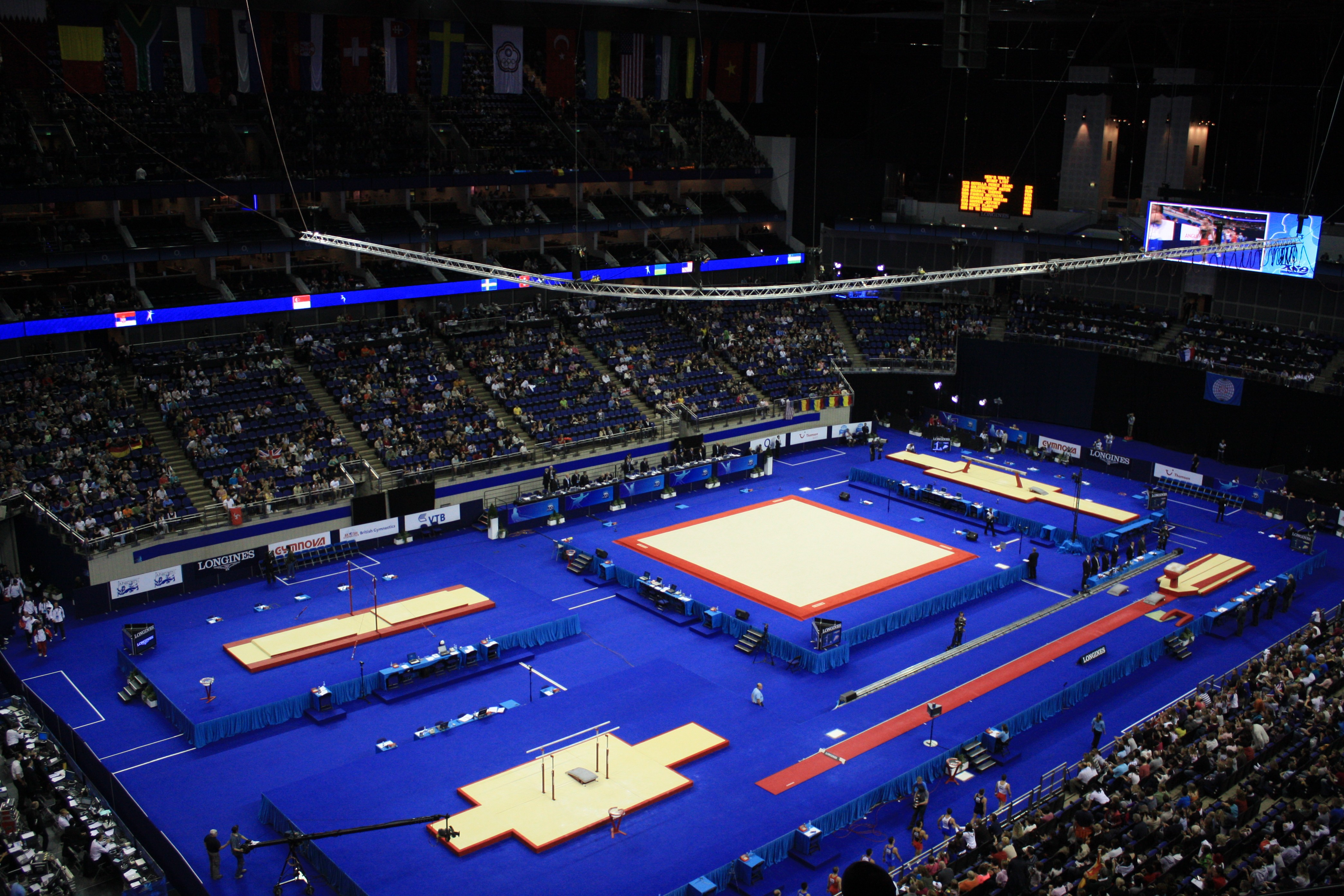
2009 World Artistic Gymnastics Championships

It was used for the 2009 World Artistic Gymnastics Championships and hosted artistic gymnastics events at the 2012 Summer Olympics.

=== Boxing ===
The first sporting event to take place was the Commonwealth Boxing Lightweight title fight featuring Amir Khan on 14 July 2007. In March 2008, the arena hosted a match between David Haye and Enzo Maccarinelli, and in November 2008 Haye fought Monte Barrett. 2008 Olympic gold medalist James DeGale fought rival George Groves in May 2011 and the arena hosted the much anticipated rematch between Carl Froch and Mikkel Kessler in May 2013. In January 2016, the arena hosted David Haye's comeback fight in over 3 years promoted by Salter Brothers Entertainment. The arena hosted the inaugural MF & DAZN: X Series event for KSI vs Swarmz & Luis Alcaraz Pineda on 27 August 2022. On 15 October 2022, the arena hosted a boxing match between Claressa Shields and Savannah Marshall that was the first time two female boxers headlined at a major venue in the United Kingdom. Shields won, and the fight headlined the first all-female boxing card in the United Kingdom.

=== Squash ===
The arena hosted the British Open 2012, one of the two most prestigious tournaments in the world.

=== Mixed martial arts ===
The arena has hosted ten mixed martial arts events promoted by the Ultimate Fighting Championship, including UFC 75: Champion vs. Champion in September 2007, UFC 85: Bedlam in June 2008, UFC 95: Sanchez vs. Stevenson in February 2009, UFC 120: Bisping vs. Akiyama in October 2010, UFC Fight Night: Gustafsson vs. Manuwa in March 2014, UFC Fight Night: Silva vs. Bisping in February 2016, UFC Fight Night: Manuwa vs. Anderson in March 2017, UFC Fight Night: Werdum vs. Volkov in March 2018, UFC Fight Night: Till vs. Masvidal in March 2019, UFC Fight Night: Volkov vs. Aspinall in March 2022, UFC Fight Night: Blaydes vs. Aspinall in July 2022, UFC 286: Edwards vs. Usman 3 in March 2023, UFC Fight Night: Aspinall vs. Tybura in July 2023, UFC Fight Night: Edwards vs. Brady in March 2025 and UFC Fight Night: Evloev vs. Murphy in March 2026.

UFC 120 featuring Michael Bisping and Yoshirio Akiyama had an attendance of 17,133 breaking the European attendance and gate receipts record which was set by the AO Arena at UFC 105. It was also the biggest box office sporting event in O2 Arena history.

=== Darts ===
On 11 February 2010, the O2 Arena hosted the opening night of the Premier League Darts, Britain's biggest indoor sporting event. Fans travelled from all over the UK to see the likes of Phil Taylor, Raymond van Barneveld, Simon Whitlock and James Wade in action. Over 8,000 fans attended the event. In 2010 and 2011, it hosted week 1 and since 2012, it has hosted the play-offs.

=== Olympics and Paralympics ===
During the 2012 Summer Olympics it was the venue for gymnastics, for which it had a spectator capacity of 16,500, and for basketball finals, with a capacity of 20,000. During the 2012 Summer Paralympics it was the venue for some wheelchair basketball round robin matches (when the basketball arena at Olympic Park was in use for other matches) and finals, for which it had a capacity of 18,000. Due to IOC sponsorship regulations, it was officially known as North Greenwich Arena during the games. The rest of the basketball and wheelchair basketball competitions took place at an arena in the Olympic Park. A 6,000 seat temporary venue called North Greenwich Arena 2 was to be built nearby to stage the Olympic badminton and rhythmic gymnastics events, but instead these took place at Wembley Arena.

=== Rugby union ===
On 29 October 2019, RugbyX was hosted at the O2 Arena. RugbyX is an indoor 5v5 rugby union tournament for both men's and women's.

=== Professional wrestling ===
Since 2008, the O2 Arena has regularly hosted professional wrestling events run by the WWE. These events would include their flagship shows Monday Night Raw and Friday Night SmackDown but also non-televised events.

The O2 Arena hosted Money in the Bank on July 1, 2023.

The O2 Arena hosted its first All Elite Wrestling and New Japan Pro-Wrestling event, Forbidden Door, on 24 August 2025.

== Other events ==
The O2 Arena held the Scout event Live 07 in 2007 to celebration of the centenary of the Scout movement.

The O2 Arena hosted Andrew Reynolds Entrepreneurs Bootcamp – the largest conference event held to date at the venue. Andrew Reynolds Bootcamp broke a UK record with its innovative High Definition projection screen – not only the largest ever used at the O2 Arena – but also the largest indoor screen in the UK. Measuring around 34.5 metres by 12 metres, the huge screen formed the central part of a huge stage set for the Entrepreneurs event which was provided by smyle.co.uk.

The O2 Arena has also held Hillsong Conference every year since 2014.
