= Tich (singer) =

- Born: Rachel Clare Furner; 1 July 1992 (age 34)
- Origin: Northampton, England
- Genres: Pop; dance
- Instrument: Vocals
- Years active: 2010–present
- Labels: AATW; Universal Music Publishing; JEM Publishing

Rachel Clare Furner (born 1 July 1992), known professionally as Tich, is an English singer and songwriter signed to Universal Music Publishing. She originally performed as an artist under Tich and as Rachel Furner, signed to Mercury Records.

== Background ==
Furner was born in Reading, Berkshire and grew up in Northampton. She began to learn to play the piano at the age of six. By age 11 she started to write her own songs about her struggles at school, these experiences inspired her to write a song called Sticks and Stones which she recorded and uploaded to Myspace. In 2006 she became a member of Youth Music Theatre UK joining the Missing Melanie company at London's Greenwood Theatre. At age 15, she got her first record deal with Mercury Records. She attended Northampton High School before moving to London at the age of 16.

== Career ==
Furner left Mercury Records after two and a half years without releasing any material. Performing under her new artist name Tich, she released an EP titled Candelight, which was released on 20 December 2012 via Gravity. Tich later signed a record deal with AATW. She supported Olly Murs across his arena tour in early 2013 and released her debut single "Dumb" on 12 May 2013 reaching number 23 on the UK Singles Chart. Her second single "Obsession" was released on 19 August 2013 and peaked at number 56 in the UK. Her second EP Candlelight II was released on 8 December 2013. Tich's 3rd single "Breathe In Breathe Out" co-written by Nick Jonas (Jonas Brothers) was released on 6 April 2014.

Furner decided to take a break from being an artist to focus on songwriting, she signed to Universal Music Publishing out of Los Angeles in June 2014.

Furner's songwriting credits include Little Mix, Jason Derulo, Craig David, The Vamps, Maggie Lindemann, Sabrina Carpenter, Ward Thomas, Ella Henderson, Matt Terry, Frances, Sweet California, Earl, Catherine McGrath and Una Healy.

Furner was presented with a plaque for sales in excess of 1,500,000 for her song "Secret Love Song" performed by Little Mix ft Jason Derulo. "All We Needed" co-written by Furner and performed by Craig David was the official Children In Need single for 2016.

== Songwriting credits ==
2026

- XO – "No Sour"
- Jasmine Jethwa - “Alright Now”
- Jasmine Jethwa - “Ladybird”
- Jasmine Jethwa - “Evensong”
- Jasmine Jethwa- “Girl Who Cried Wolf”
- Jasmine Jethwa - “I Believe In Love”
- The Butterfly Effect - “Time After Time”
- The Butterfly Effect - “Magpie”
- The Butterfly Effect - “Hollywood”
- The Butterfly Effect - “Dark Side Of The Moon”

2025

- Red Velvet - Irene & Seulgi – "Tilt"

2024

- Rachel Grae – "Stranger to Love"
- Ella McRobb – "First to Apologise"

2023

- Jasmine Jethwa – "Money to Burn"

2022

- Grace Davies – "Already Gone"
- The Streets – "Brexit at Tiffany's"
- Calum Scott – "The Way You Loved Me"
- Lisa Wright – "Ready Now"
- Jazz Morley – "Nobody Knows"
- Taeyeon – "INVU"
- Conf3ssions – "Hallelujah"
- James Morrison – "Don't Mess With Love"

2021

- Megan McKenna – "Won't Go Back Again"
- Natalie Imbruglia – "Just Like Old Times"
- Birdy – "Lighthouse"

2020

- Steps – "Under My Skin"
- Ronan Keating – "Love Will Remain"
- Josef Salvat – "Call On Me"
- The Shires – "About Last Night"
- HRVY – "Me Because Of You"
- Julian Jordan – "Love You Better"

2019

- Little Mix – "One I've Been Missing"
- Professor Green – "Alice"
- Kato – "Always Been You"
- Mans Zelmerlow – "Walk with Me"
- Ward Thomas – "One More Goodbye"
- Ward Thomas – "Ain't That Easy"
- Ward Thomas – "It's Not Just Me"
- Claire Richards – "Brave"
- Claire Richards – "Ruins"

2018

- Little Mix – "American Boy"
- Little Mix – "Woman's World"
- Alice Chater – "Heartbreak Hotel"
- Craig David – "Focus"
- Kara Marni – "All Or Nothing"
- Cailin Russo – Joyride
- Craig David – "Love Me Like It's Yesterday"

2017

- The Vamps ft Maggie Lindemann – "Personal"
- Matt Terry – "Trouble"
- Catherine McGrath – "Talk of This Town"
- Gray ft Frances – "Room 101"
- Mike Perry ft The Vamps & Sabrina Carpenter – "Hands"
- Una Healy – "Staring at the Moon"
- Una Healy – "Grow Up, Not Old"
- Frances – "Under Our Feet"
- Earl – "Travelling Heart"

2016

- Craig David – "All We Needed"
- Sebastian Wibe – "Fall Like A Hero"
- Little Mix ft Jason Derulo – "Secret Love Song"
- Little Mix – "Secret Love Song, Pt. II"

2015

- Edurne – "Va A Ser Mejor"
- Sweet California – "Just One"

== Discography ==
=== Extended plays ===
Title	Album details
Candlelight	Released: 20 December 2012; Label: Gravity Digital; Format: Digital download
Candlelight II	Released: 8 December 2013; Label: AATW; Format: Digital download

=== Singles ===
Year	Title	Peak chart positions		Album
Year	Title	UK	SCO	Album
2013	"Dumb"	23	22	
2013	"Obsession"	56	—	
2014	"Breathe in Breathe Out"	129	—	
