= Dumb (Tich song) =

Debut single from British singer Tich

Single by Tich

from the album What I'm Meant to Say
- Released: 13 May 2013
- Recorded: 2012–13
- Genre: Pop
- Length: 3:17
- Label: All Around the World
- Songwriter(s): Rachel Furner, Nick Atkinson, Timz Lam, Mushtaq Uddin
- Producer(s): Mushtaq Uddin, Timz Lam

Tich singles chronology
"Dumb" (2013)	"Obsession" (2013)

"Dumb" is the debut single from British singer Tich. The song was released in the United Kingdom as a digital download on 13 May 2013. The song has peaked at number 23 on the UK Singles Chart and at number 22 in Scotland.

== Music video ==
A music video to accompany the release of "Dumb" was first released onto YouTube on 12 March 2013 at a total length of three minutes and twenty-three seconds.

== Track listing ==
Digital download
No.	Title	Length
1.	"Dumb"	3:17

== Chart performance ==
Chart (2013)	Peak positions
Scotland (OCC)	22
UK Singles (OCC)	23

== Release history ==
Country	Date	Format	Label
United Kingdom	13 May 2013	Digital download	All Around the World
