= The Ocean (Mike Perry song) =

2016 debut single by Mike Perry

Single by Mike Perry featuring Shy Martin
- Released: 15 April 2016
- Genre: Tropical house; deep house
- Length: 3:03
- Label: DF Records; Sony Music Entertainment
- Songwriter(s): Mikael Persson; Sara Hjellström (SHY Martin); Nirob Islam (SHY Nodi)
- Producer(s): Mike Perry

Mike Perry singles chronology
"The Ocean" (2016)	"Inside the Lines" (2016)

Music video
- The Ocean on YouTube

"The Ocean" is a song by Swedish DJ and music producer Mike Perry, featuring vocals from Shy Martin. It was released as a digital download in Sweden on 15 April 2016. The song peaked at number 1 in Sweden, and reached the top 20 in Australia, Austria, Denmark, Finland, Germany, the Netherlands, Norway and Switzerland. The song has additionally peaked at number 39 in the UK. The song was performed by Perry during the Summerburst Festival at Ullevi in Gothenburg, Sweden.

== Background ==
Mike Perry, whose real name is Mikael Persson, only produces music alongside his regular job, which is servicing Volvo diesel car engines in Skövde, Sweden. Although he had played "some gigs" before the song, he began receiving more offers after the song became a viral hit on Spotify, later playing the Summerburst Festival and a festival in Gärdet. Perry credited the song's "simple" and "no frills" nature as well as its "timely" sound as the reason for its success, saying that he prefers not to complicate the sound of songs he creates. The song was later placed in the Chill Hits playlist on Spotify, which helped it achieve chart success.

The vocalist and co-writer of the song, 23-year-old Sara Hjellström, who records under the alias Shy Martin, said she "did not think it would be a hit". Hjellström, originally part of the band Browsing Collection, co-wrote the song with her bandmate Nirob Islam from her current group, Södra Station. They also co-wrote the song "Summer Love" for the boy band FO&O.

As of November 2020, the music video, aired 2016-07-20, has been viewed 154 million times on YouTube, and the audio-only version published on 2016-06-03 on the promotion channel Tropical House Records additional 100 million times.

== Track listing ==
Digital download
No.	Title	Length
1.	"The Ocean" (featuring Shy Martin)	3:03

== Chart performance ==
=== Weekly charts ===
Chart (2016–17)	Peak position
Australia (ARIA)	11
Austria (Ö3 Austria Top 40)	4
Belgium (Ultratop 50 Flanders)	17
Belgium (Ultratop 50 Wallonia)	9
Canada (Canadian Hot 100)	58
Czech Republic (Rádio – Top 100)	31
Czech Republic (Singles Digitál Top 100)	13
Denmark (Tracklisten)	13
Finland (Suomen virallinen lista)	6
France (SNEP)	11
Germany (GfK)	5
Ireland (IRMA)	18
Italy (FIMI)	24
Netherlands (Dutch Top 40)	10
Netherlands (Single Top 100)	10
New Zealand (Recorded Music NZ)	32
Norway (VG-lista)	3
Poland (Polish Airplay Top 100)	4
Portugal (AFP)	23
Russia Airplay (Tophit)	26
Scotland (OCC)	44
Slovakia (Rádio Top 100)	4
Slovakia (Singles Digitál Top 100)	10
Slovenia (SloTop50)	13
Spain (PROMUSICAE)	48
Sweden (Sverigetopplistan)	1
Switzerland (Schweizer Hitparade)	4
UK Singles (OCC)	39
US Bubbling Under Hot 100 (Billboard)	10
US Hot Dance/Electronic Songs (Billboard)	11

=== Year-end charts ===
Chart (2016)	Position
Australia (ARIA)	62
Austria (Ö3 Austria Top 40)	25
Belgium (Ultratop Flanders)	68
Belgium (Ultratop Wallonia)	66
Denmark (Tracklisten)	46
France (SNEP)	83
Germany (Official German Charts)	27
Italy (FIMI)	69
Netherlands (Dutch Top 40)	53
Netherlands (Single Top 100)	48
Switzerland (Schweizer Hitparade)	33
Sweden (Sverigetopplistan)	5
US Hot Dance/Electronic Songs (Billboard)	25

== Certifications ==
Region	Certification	Certified units/sales
Australia (ARIA)	2× Platinum	140,000^{‡}
Austria (IFPI Austria)	Gold	15,000^{‡}
Belgium (BRMA)	Platinum	20,000^{‡}
Canada (Music Canada)	Gold	40,000^{‡}
Denmark (IFPI Danmark)	2× Platinum	180,000^{‡}
France (SNEP)	Diamond	233,333^{‡}
Germany (BVMI)	3× Gold	600,000^{‡}
Italy (FIMI)	2× Platinum	100,000^{‡}
Mexico (AMPROFON)	3× Platinum+Gold	210,000^{‡}
New Zealand (RMNZ)	2× Platinum	60,000^{‡}
Poland (ZPAV)	2× Platinum	40,000^{‡}
Spain (PROMUSICAE)	Platinum	60,000^{‡}
United Kingdom (BPI)	Gold	400,000^{‡}
United States (RIAA)	Gold	500,000^{‡}
Streaming
Sweden (GLF)	6× Platinum	48,000,000^{†}
^{‡} Sales+streaming figures based on certification alone.^{†} Streaming-only figures based on certification alone.

== Awards and nominations ==
Awards
Year	Award	Category	Nominated work	Result
2017	P3 Guld	Song Of The Year	The Ocean	Nominated
2017	Grammis	Song Of The Year	The Ocean	Nominated

== Release date ==
Region	Date	Format	Label
Sweden	15 April 2016	Digital download	DF Records; Sony Music Entertainment
United States	4 October 2016	Mainstream radio	Columbia Records
