= Too Good to Be True (Danny Avila and the Vamps song) =

Single by Danny Ávila and The Vamps featuring Machine Gun Kelly

from the album Night & Day (Day Edition)
- Released: 2 March 2018
- Genre: EDM • future bass • dance-pop • hip hop
- Length: 3:31
- Label: Sony Music Entertainment
- Songwriters: Rick Parkhouse; Bryn Christopher; George Tizzard; Richard Colson Baker; Phil Plested
- Producers: Red Triangle; Danny Ávila

Danny Ávila singles chronology
| "Loco" (2017) | "Too Good to Be True" (2018) | "End of the Night" (2018) |

The Vamps singles chronology
| "Personal" (2017) | "Too Good to Be True" (2018) | "Hair Too Long" (2018) |

Machine Gun Kelly singles chronology
| "Home" (2017) | "Too Good to Be True" (2018) | "Rap Devil" (2018) |

"Too Good to Be True" is a song by Spanish house and electro house DJ and producer Danny Ávila and British pop rock band The Vamps featuring vocals from American rapper and actor Machine Gun Kelly. The song was released as a digital download on 2 March 2018 through Sony Music Entertainment. It serves as the second single from the Vamps' third studio album Night & Day, being included on the second part of it, called Day Edition.

== Track listing ==
Digital download
| No. | Title | Length |
|---|---|---|
| 1. | "Too Good to Be True" (featuring Machine Gun Kelly) | 3:31 |

== Charts ==
| Chart (2018) | Peak position |
|---|---|
| Russia Airplay (Tophit) | 563 |
| Scottish Singles Sales (Official Charts) | 59 |
| US Hot Dance/Electronic Songs (Billboard) | 42 |

== Release history ==
| Region | Date | Format | Version | Label | Ref. |
|---|---|---|---|---|---|
| United Kingdom | 2 March 2018 | Digital download | Original | Sony Music Entertainment | |
| Italy | 23 March 2018 | Contemporary hit radio | Original | Sony Music Entertainment | |
| Various | 13 July 2018 | Digital download | Remixes EP | Sony Music Entertainment | |
