= Personal (The Vamps song) =

Single by The Vamps featuring Maggie Lindemann

from the album Night & Day (Day Edition)
- Released: 13 October 2017
- Length: 3:13
- Label: Virgin EMI Records
- Songwriter(s): Connor Ball; Tristan Evans; James McVey; Brad Simpson; Nicholas Gale; Sam Preston; George Tizzard; Rick Parkhouse; Rachel Furner
- Producer(s): Digital Farm Animals

The Vamps singles chronology
"Staying Up" (2017)	"Personal" (2017)	"Too Good to Be True" (2018)

Maggie Lindemann singles chronology
"Pretty Girl" (2016)	"Personal" (2017)	"Obsessed" (2017)

"Personal" is a song by British pop rock band The Vamps featuring vocals from Maggie Lindemann. The song was released as a digital download on 13 October 2017 through Universal Music Group. It serves as the first single from their third studio album Night & Day, being included on the second part of it, called Day Edition.

== Music video ==
A music video to accompany the release of "Personal" was first released onto YouTube on 20 October 2017 at a total length of three minutes and fourteen seconds. It features the lead singer (Brad Simpson) and Maggie Lindemann (his love interest) as children at Maggie's 7th birthday party

== Track listing ==
Digital download
No.	Title	Length
1.	"Personal" (feat. Maggie Lindemann)	3:13

Digital download
No.	Title	Length
1.	"Personal" (Acoustic)	3:05

Digital download
No.	Title	Length
1.	"Personal" (Jaded Remix)	3:12

Digital download
No.	Title	Length
1.	"Personal" (Cedric Gervais Remix)	2:43

== Charts ==
Chart (2017)	Peak position
Scotland (OCC)	45
UK Singles (OCC)	76

== Release history ==
Region	Date	Format	Version	Label	Ref.
Various	13 October 2017	Digital download	Original	Virgin EMI Records	
United Kingdom	20 October 2017	Contemporary hit radio	Original	Virgin EMI Records	
United Kingdom	1 December 2017	Digital download	Acoustic	Virgin EMI Records	
United Kingdom	8 December 2017	Digital download	Jaded Remix	Virgin EMI Records	
United Kingdom	15 December 2017	Digital download	Cedric Gervais Remix	Virgin EMI Records	
