= Beliya =

2016 single by Vishal Dadlani and Shekar Ravjiani

Single by Vishal Dadlani and Shekhar Ravjiani featuring The Vamps
- Released: 16 August 2016
- Recorded: London
- Genre: Bollywood; pop
- Length: 4:11
- Label: Bottomline; Virgin EMI
- Songwriters: Vishal–Shekhar; The Vamps
- Producers: Vishal–Shekhar; Tristan Evans; Abhijit Nalani

Vishal Dadlani singles chronology
"Ud-Daa Punjab (remix)" (2016)	"Beliya" (2016)	"Bappa" (2016)

Shekhar Ravjiani single singles chronology
"Shekhar Ravjiani's Hanuman Chalisa" (2014)	"Beliya" (2016)	"Bappa" (2016)

The Vamps singles chronology
"I Found a Girl" (2016)	"Beliya" (2016)	"All Night" (2016)

Music video
- "Beliya" on YouTube

"Beliya" is a song recorded by Indian music direction duo Vishal Dadlani and Shekhar Ravjiani (or Vishal–Shekhar) featuring English pop rock band The Vamps. The song was recorded and produced in London. The song was released on 16 August 2016 with an accompanying music video on YouTube.

== Background ==
"Beliya" was written by Vishal Dadlani, Shekhar Ravjiani, and members of the English pop rock band The Vamps. "Beliya" is reportedly referred to as a first of its kind collaboration by India's celebrated music direction duo Vishal–Shekhar have collaborated with the English pop rock band The Vamps for the song "Beliya". Initiated by Bottomline Media and Virgin EMI Records, this is the first of many collaborations to come.

== Music video ==
The official music video was uploaded to YouTube on 16 August 2016. It features Vishal–Shekhar and The Vamps recording the song in a studio.

== Composition and lyrical interpretation ==
"Beliya" is a fusion song consisting elements of Bollywood and pop music. The song is reportedly referred to as the celebration of two cultures by the Indian music direction duo Vishal–Shekhar. The song opens with 'dholak' and the folk instrument returns during the chorus. The 'dholak' isn't the only Indian instrument to find a place in Beliya's sound, as the composers subtly use flute further in the track. The celebration of the cultures is denoted. The song features vocals from The Vamps singing the lead in English verses, the duo added soft Hindi lyrics post-chorus.

The song was also praised by Indian actor and producer Riteish Deshmukh on his official Twitter handle. Many other celebrities including Sonakshi Sinha, Farhan Akhtar, Karan Johar and entrepreneur Rohan Chakraborty have praised the song and its lyrics.

== Promotions and live performance ==
The Vamps had visited India to promote "Beliya" to perform with the Indian music director duo Vishal–Shekhar at The Kapil Sharma Show.

== Personnel ==
Vishal–Shekhar

- Vishal Dadlani – instruments, vocals
- Shekhar Ravjiani – instruments, vocals

The Vamps

- Bradley Simpson – instruments, vocals
- Connor Ball – instruments, vocals
- James McVey – instruments, vocals
- Tristan Evans – instruments, vocals

Additional instruments

- Navin Kumar – flute
- Dipesh Verma – percussions

== Chart performance ==
Chart (2016)	Peak position
myUzer Trending/ Global Top 50	7

== Release history ==
Region	Date	Format	Label	Ref.
India	17 August 2017	Digital download	Virgin EMI	
