= Married in Vegas =

Single by The Vamps

from the album Cherry Blossom
- Released: 31 July 2020
- Length: 3:22
- Label: Virgin EMI
- Songwriter(s): James McVey; Tristan Evans; Bradley Simpson; Connor Ball; Peter Rycroft
- Producer(s): Lostboy

The Vamps singles chronology
"All the Lies" (2019)	"Married in Vegas" (2020)	"Chemicals" (2020)

"Married in Vegas" is a song by British pop rock band The Vamps. It was released as a digital download on 31 July 2020 via Virgin EMI as the lead single from their fifth studio album Cherry Blossom. The song was written by James McVey, Tristan Evans, Bradley Simpson, Connor Ball and Peter Rycroft.

== Music video ==
A music video to accompany the release of "Married in Vegas" was first released on YouTube on 31 July 2020. The video was filmed remotely in lockdown with help from producer Lostboy.

== Track listing ==
Digital download
No.	Title	Length
1.	"Married in Vegas"	3:22

Digital download
No.	Title	Length
1.	"Married in Vegas" (Matoma Remix)	3:14
2.	"Married in Vegas" (Slowed N Reverb)	4:04

Digital download
No.	Title	Length
1.	"Married in Vegas" (Acoustic)	3:37

== Personnel ==
Credits adapted from Tidal.

- Bradley Simpson – guitar, vocals
- Lostboy – production, keyboards, programming, record engineering
- Luke Burgoyne – mixing assistance
- Charles Haydon Hicks – mixing assistance
- Tristan Evans – drums
- Stuart Hawkes – master engineering
- Dan Grech-Marguerat – mixing, programming

== Charts ==
Chart (2020)	Peak position
Scotland (OCC)	25
UK Singles Downloads (OCC)	34

== Release history ==
Region	Date	Format	Label	Ref.
Various	31 July 2020	Digital download	Virgin EMI	
Italy	31 July 2020	Contemporary hit radio	Universal	
United Kingdom	19 September 2020	Adult contemporary	Virgin EMI	
