= Hands (Mike Perry song) =

2017 song by Mike Perry

Single by Mike Perry, the Vamps and Sabrina Carpenter

from the album Night & Day (Night Edition)
- Released: 19 May 2017
- Recorded: 2017
- Genre: Tropical house
- Length: 2:47
- Label: DF; Sony
- Songwriters: Connor Ball; Tristan Evans; James McVey; Brad Simpson; Sam Preston; Rick Parkhouse; George Tizzard; Rachel Furner; Mikael Persson; Dimitri Vangelis; Andreas Wiman
- Producers: Red Triangle; Persson; Vangelis; Wiman

Mike Perry singles chronology
"Body to Body" (2017)	"Hands" (2017)	"Stay Young" (2017)

The Vamps singles chronology
"Middle of the Night" (2017)	"Hands" (2017)	"Staying Up" (2017)

Sabrina Carpenter singles chronology
"Thumbs" (2017)	"Hands" (2017)	"Why" (2017)

Audio video
- "Hands" on YouTube

"Hands" is a song by Swedish DJ Mike Perry, British band the Vamps and American singer Sabrina Carpenter. It was released on 19 May 2017 by DF Records and Sony Music. The song was written by Brad Simpson, Connor Ball, Tristan Evans, James McVey, George Tizzard, Rick Parkhouse, Samuel Preston, Rachel Furner, Mikael Persson, Dimitri Vangelis and Andreas Wiman and produced by Red Triangle, Persson, Vangelis and Wiman. Lyrically, the deep house, pop and tropical house song talks about thinking of a person you want to have a physical contact. It was the third single from their third studio album, Night & Day (Night Edition) (2017).

== Background and recording ==
The song was described as "upbeat with inexplicable energy".

The first time Sabrina Carpenter used profanity in a song, the word "shit" in one of her verses in the song was misunderstood. "Shirt" was originally written in the lyrics but Carpenter sang "shit" instead, as she had not seen the lyrics but only heard the demo. James McVey of The Vamps only told her about the lyrics after the song was released. When asked by Carpenter on why the word was "shirt", McVey said "Well, in the first verse it goes, 'drop that dress to the floor', so she would say 'leave your shirt at the door'."

The song was written in 2017 by Brad Simpson, Connor Ball, Tristan Evans, James McVey, George Tizzard, Rick Parkhouse, Samuel Preston, Rachel Furner, Mikael Persson, Dimitri Vangelis and Andreas Wiman and produced by Red Triangle, Persson, Vangelis and Wiman. The song's vocalists are Simpson and Sabrina Carpenter. The song was mixed and recorded by Persson and was mastered by Dick Beetham at 360 Mastering in London. The bass guitar was played by Ball and Parkhouse while drums were played by Evans. Parkhouse programmed the track and provided additional vocals with Furner, Tizzard and Preston. Clapping was provided by Furner and Preston while Tizzard played piano. Tizzard and McVey play guitar on the track.

== Live performances ==
The song was performed by The Vamps on their Middle of the Night Tour, alongside Carpenter, who toured together with them as a supporting act.

== Credits and personnel ==
Recording and management

- Mastered at 360 Mastering (London, United Kingdom)
- Global Talent Publishing, Warner/Chappell Music Publishing, B-Unique/Spirit Publishing, Universal/Jem Music Publishing, Global/Spirit Publishing, Ten Music Publishing, Copyright Control

Personnel

- Brad Simpson – vocals, songwriting
- Sabrina Carpenter – vocals
- Connor Ball – songwriting, bass guitar
- Tristan Evans – songwriting, drums
- James McVey – songwriting, guitar
- George Tizzard – songwriting, guitar, piano, additional vocals
- Rick Parkhouse – songwriting, bass, programming, additional vocals
- Samuel Preston – songwriting, clapping, additional vocals
- Rachel Furner – songwriting, clapping, additional vocals
- Mikael Persson – songwriting, production, mixing, recording
- Dimitri Vangelis – songwriting, production
- Andreas Wiman – songwriting, production
- Red Triangle – production
- Dick Beetham – mastering

Credits adapted from Night & Day (Night Edition) liner notes.

== Charts ==
Chart performance
Chart (2017)	Peak position
Czech Republic Singles Digital (ČNS IFPI)	95
Sweden (Sverigetopplistan)	70
Slovakia Singles Digital (ČNS IFPI)	98
UK Singles Downloads Chart (OCC)	58
UK Singles Sales Chart (OCC)	59

== Certifications ==
Certifications
Region	Certification	Certified units/sales
Streaming
Sweden (GLF)	Gold	4,000,000^{†}
^{†} Streaming-only figures based on certification alone.

== Release history ==
Release history and formats
Region	Date	Format	Label	Ref.
Various	19 May 2017	Digital download; streaming	DF; Sony	
