= Staying Up =

Single by Matoma and The Vamps
- Released: 31 August 2017
- Genre: Tropical
- Length: 3:10
- Label: Parlophone; FFRR
- Songwriters: Noel Salmon; Nathan Cross; Ben Preston; BullySongs; The Vamps; Matoma
- Producer: Matoma

Matoma singles chronology
"Party on the West Coast" (2017)	"Staying Up" (2017)	"Slow" (2017)

The Vamps singles chronology
"Hands" (2017)	"Staying Up" (2017)	"Personal" (2017)

"Staying Up" is a song by Norwegian DJ and record producer Matoma and British pop rock band The Vamps. The song was released as a digital download on 31 August 2017 through Parlophone and FFRR. This marks the second collaboration between Matoma and the band, the first being "All Night".

== Music video ==
A music video to accompany the release of "Staying Up" was first released onto YouTube on 8 September 2017 at a total length of three minutes and seventeen seconds. The music video was shot in Seljord Municipality, Hjartdal Municipality, and Notodden Municipality in Telemark county, Norway.

== Track listing ==
Digital download
No.	Title	Length
1.	"Staying Up"	3:10

== Charts ==
Chart (2017)	Peak position
Norway (VG-lista)	37
Sweden Heatseeker (Sverigetopplistan)	1
Scottish Singles Sales (Official Charts)	31
UK Singles (Official Charts)	80

== Release history ==
Region	Date	Format	Label	Ref.
United States	31 August 2017	Digital download	Parlophone, FFRR	
United Kingdom	2 September 2017	Contemporary hit radio	Parlophone, FFRR	
