= Taylor Grey =

American singer-songwriter

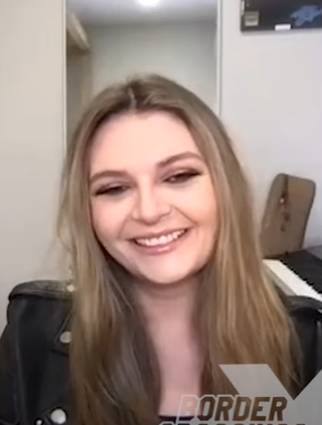
- Grey in 2023
- Education: Stanford University (BS)
- Occupation: Singer-songwriter
- Label: Kobalt

Taylor Grey is an American singer-songwriter. Signed to Kobalt Music Group, she won Best Pop Album of the Year for her debut studio album Space Case (2017), and Best Pop Song of the Year for her 2017 single "Miami" (featuring Spencer Kane) at the 16th Annual Independent Music Awards.

== Background ==
Taylor Grey was born and raised in Northern California. She attended Stanford University in 2015 as a psychology major and graduated in 2020.

== Career ==
In 2016, Grey released her debut EP, Mind of Mine, followed by the release of Mind of Mine II EP. Grey also toured with The X Factor contestant, Jacob Whitesides on his Lovesick Tour, and later joined The Summer Set on their Made For You Tour.

On June 16, 2017, Grey released her debut studio album Space Case, executive produced by record producer Josh Abraham. The album was produced and engineered by Grammy nominated producer, Nico Stadi.

Grey joined Jacob Whitesides once more in the summer of 2017 on his Basically Happy Tour, in Northern America and Canada.

In May 2019, Grey released the extended plays including Back to Bite and Intentionally.

In early 2019, Grey went back on the tour for select dates with the Vamps in the UK, and New Hope Club in the United States.

Grey joined Why Don't We on the US tour throughout the summer of 2019, and continued on with them throughout Europe and Australia for the remainder of the year.
