= Hair Too Long =

Single by The Vamps

from the album Night & Day (Day Edition)
- Released: 20 April 2018
- Recorded: 2017
- Length: 3:26
- Label: Sony Music Entertainment
- Songwriter(s): Connor Ball; Tristan Evans; James McVey; Brad Simpson
- Producer(s): Jordan Riley

The Vamps singles chronology
"Too Good to Be True" (2018)	"Hair Too Long" (2018)	"Just My Type" (2018)

"Hair Too Long" is a song by British pop rock band The Vamps. The song was released as a digital download on 20 April 2018 through Sony Music Entertainment. It serves as the third single from their third studio album Night & Day, being included on the second part of it, called Day Edition.

== Music video ==
A music video to accompany the release of "Hair Too Long" was first released onto YouTube on 20 April 2018 at a total length of three minutes and thirty-one seconds.

== Track listing ==
Digital download
No.	Title	Length
1.	"Hair Too Long"	3:26

== Charts ==
Chart (2018)	Peak position
Scotland (OCC)	31

== Release history ==
Region	Date	Format	Label
United Kingdom	20 April 2018	Digital download	Sony Music Entertainment
