= Danny Ávila =

Spanish DJ & producer (born 1995)

Danny Avila
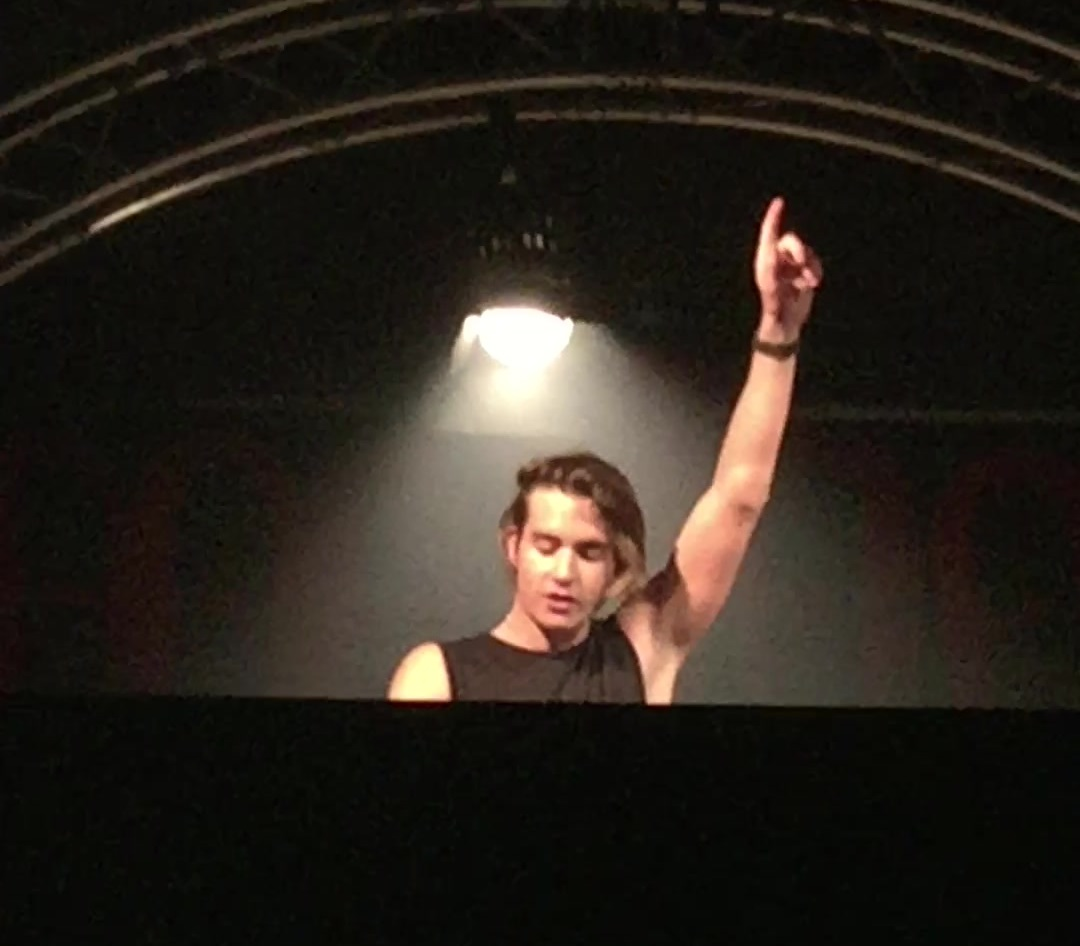
- Avila live at Airbeat One 2016 in Germany

Background information
- Born: Daniel Avila Roson; 1 April 1995 (age 31)
- Origin: Madrid, Spain
- Genre: Electro house, progressive house, big room house, future bass, dance-pop, future house, techno, future rave
- Occupations: Producer, musician
- Instruments: Keyboards, turntables, guitar, Logic Pro, FL Studio
- Years active: 2010 – present
- Labels: Spinnin', Musical Freedom, Hexagon, Ultra
- Website: djdannyavila.com

Daniel "Danny" Avila Rosón (born 1 April 1995) is a Spanish house and electro house DJ and producer.

== Career ==
He has worked with Tiësto, Deniz Koyu and Fedde Le Grand. His first set was in 2010 in the Spanish club Kapital. In 2011, he was nominated as the "DJ Revelación" at the Vicious Music Awards by Ron Barceló 2011. In the summer of 2012 he was the youngest DJ of the beach club Blue Marlin. In September 2012 he worked in the United States, the Tour Generation Wild with the artists Deniz Koyu, Mikael Weermets, Sick Individuals and dBerrie. He also worked in Macau, Manila, London, and São Paulo.

Ávila debuted at the Ultra Music Festival of Miami in March 2013. He signed a contract with MGM of Vegas as the youngest resident in the history of Hakkasan in 2013 with artists like Steve Aoki, Laidback Luke, Deadmau5, Tommy Trash, Tiesto and Calvin Harris.

MTV and Billboard identified his as "one to watch".

In November 2014, Danny partnered with EDM lifestyle brand Electric Family to produce a collaboration bracelet for which 100% of the proceeds are donated to Doctors Without Borders. The partnership has raised over $1k as of November 2014.

His hit song of 2014 BOOM with dj Merzo is both used in the comedy movie Dirty Grandpa and the T-Mobile ad campaign with Aaron Paul.

== Discography ==
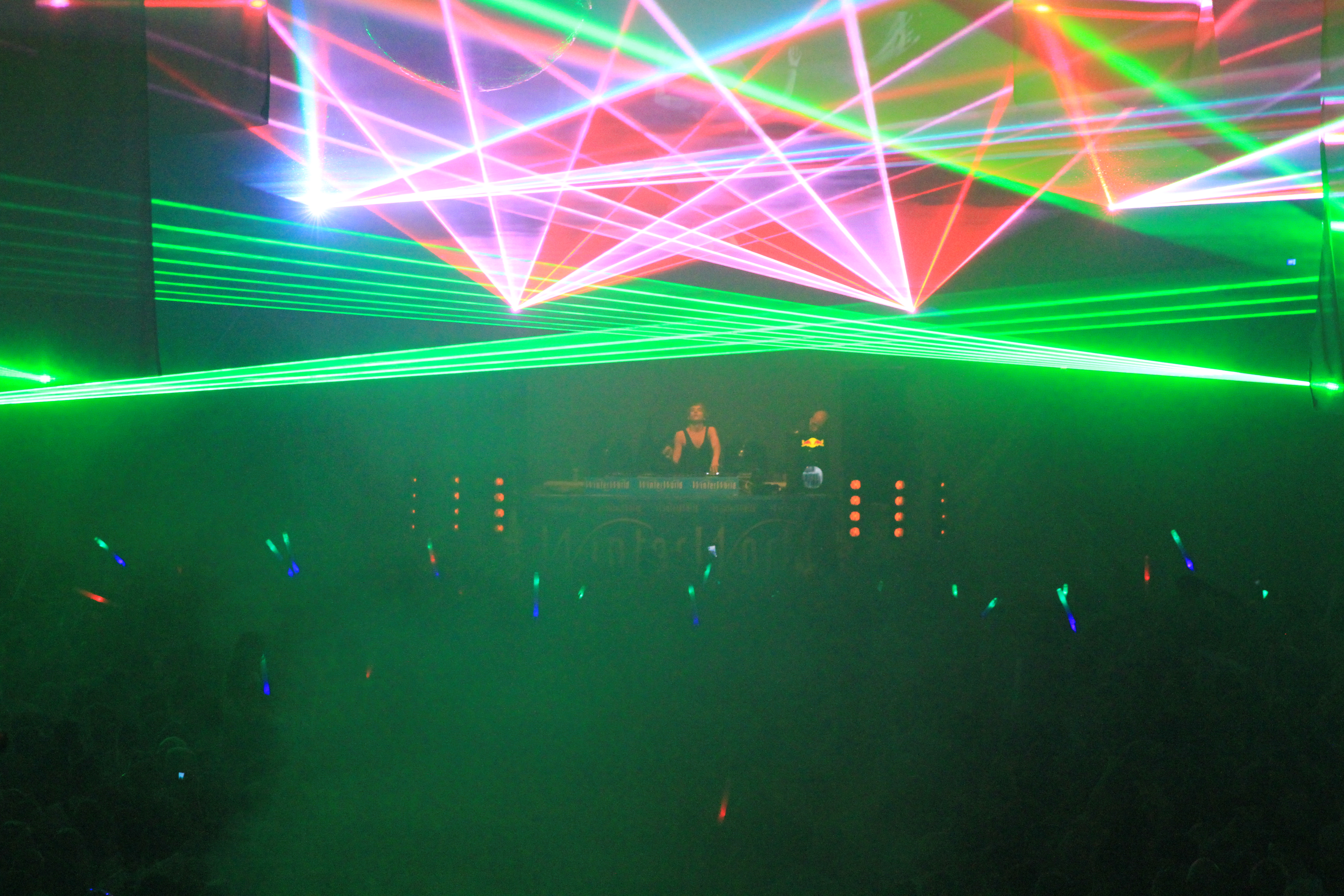
Danny Avila at Winterworld, Germany, 2014

=== Compilations ===
- 2012: Danny Avila's Big Room Mix [DJ Magazine]

=== Singles ===
==== Charted singles ====
Title	Year	Peak chart positions	
Title	Year	FRA	SCO
"Cream" (with Tujamo)	2015	117	—
"Too Good to Be True" (with The Vamps featuring Machine Gun Kelly)	2018	—	59

==== Other singles ====
- 2012: "Breaking Your Fall" [Big Beat Records]
- 2013: "Voltage" [Spinnin' Records]
- 2013: "Tronco" [Musical Freedom]
- 2013: "Rasta Funk" [Spinnin' Records]
- 2013: "Poseidon" [Musical Freedom]
- 2014: "Rock the Place" (vs. twoloud) [Musical Freedom]
- 2014: "Boom!" (with Merzo) [Dim Mak]
- 2015: "Plastik" [Playbox Music]
- 2015: "Close Your Eyes" (with Kaaze) (Official Parookaville Festival Anthem) [Playbox Music]
- 2015: "C.H.E.C.K" [Playbox Music]
- 2016: "High" (featuring Haliene) [Ultra Records]
- 2017: "Loco" (with Nervo featuring Reverie) [Spinnin' Records]
- 2018: "Brah" [Spinnin' Premium]
- 2018: "End of the Night" [Sony Music Entertainment]
- 2019: "Keep It Goin'" (with Deorro) [Ultra Records]
- 2019: "Fast Forward" [Smash The House]
- 2019: "Chase The Sun" (Planet Funk identical song sampled) [Spinnin' Records]
- 2020: "Beautiful Girls" [Kontor / Paper Rocket Music]
- 2020: "Run Wild" [Musical Freedom]
- 2020: "Remedy" (featuring Salena Mastroianni) [Hexagon]
- 2020: "The Unknown" [Hexagon]
- 2020: "Pushin" [Musical Freedom]
- 2020: "My Blood" [Spinnin' Records]
- 2021: "No One Else Is You" [Heartfeldt Records]
- 2021: "Mother & Father" (featuring Bukhu) [Armada Music]
- 2021: "The Baddest" (featuring Kris Kiss) [Armada Music]
- 2021: "The Captain" [Armada Music]

=== Remixes ===
- 2011: Germán Brigante – "Tiki Taka" (DJ Mind & Danny Avila Remix)
- 2012: M.A.N.D.Y. & Booka Shade – "Body Language" (Danny Avila Bootleg)
- 2013: Skylar Grey – "C'mon Let Me Ride" (Mikael Weermets & Danny Avila's Trapstep Remix)
- 2013: Krewella – "Live for the Night" (Deniz Koyu & Danny Avila Remix)
- 2014: Stromae – "Tous les mêmes" (Lucas Divino, Andres Chevalle & Danny Avila Dirty Dutch Remix)
- 2016: MNEK & Zara Larsson - "Never Forget You" (Danny Avila Bootleg)
- 2017: Gavin James - "I Don't Know Why" (Danny Avila Remix)
