= Middle of the Night (The Vamps and Martin Jensen song) =

Single by The Vamps and Martin Jensen

from the album Night & Day (Night Edition)
- Released: 28 April 2017
- Length: 2:56
- Label: Virgin EMI
- Songwriter(s): Anders Christensen; Edward Drewett; Martin Jensen; Stephen Philibin; Matthew Radosevich; Chris Wallace
- Producer(s): Martin Jensen

The Vamps singles chronology
"All Night" (2016)	"Middle of the Night" (2017)	"Hands" (2017)

Martin Jensen singles chronology
"Solo Dance" (2016)	"Middle of the Night" (2017)	"Wait" (2017)

Music video
- "Middle of the Night" on YouTube

"Middle of the Night" is a song by British band the Vamps and Danish DJ and producer Martin Jensen. The dubstep-infused song was released as a digital download on 28 April 2017 by Virgin EMI Records and served as the second single from their number one third studio album Night & Day, being included on the first part of it, called Night Edition.

== Music video ==
A music video was released on 15 May 2017. The video portrays a deaf couple arguing in sign language during dinner. It featured the deaf actress Rose Ayling-Ellis.

== Track listing ==
Digital download
No.	Title	Length
1.	"Middle of the Night"	2:56

Digital download – EP
No.	Title	Length
1.	"Middle of the Night" (acoustic)	2:29
2.	"Middle of the Night" (Kris Kross Amsterdam remix)	3:43
3.	"Middle of the Night" (Goldhouse remix)	4:17
4.	"Middle of the Night" (Felon remix)	3:09
5.	"Middle of the Night" (Steve Void remix)	2:57
6.	"Middle of the Night" (piano version)	2:49

== Charts ==
Chart (2017)	Peak position
Australia (ARIA)	127
Ireland (IRMA)	82
New Zealand Heatseekers (RMNZ)	8
Scotland (OCC)	8
UK Singles (OCC)	44

== Certifications ==
Region	Certification	Certified units/sales
New Zealand (RMNZ)	Gold	15,000^{‡}
United Kingdom (BPI)	Silver	200,000^{‡}
^{‡} Sales+streaming figures based on certification alone.

== Release history ==
Region	Date	Format	Version	Label	Ref.
Worldwide	28 April 2017	Digital download	Original	Virgin EMI	
Italy	26 May 2017	Contemporary hit radio	Original	Universal	
United Kingdom	21 July 2017	Contemporary hit radio	Original	Virgin EMI	
United States	4 August 2017	Digital download	Middle of the Night – EP	Virgin EMI	
United States	22 August 2017	Top 40 radio	Original	Island	
