= Cherry Blossom (album) =

Studio album by the Vamps
- Released: 16 October 2020
- Recorded: 2019–2020
- Genre: Pop; pop rock
- Length: 32:07
- Label: EMI
- Producer: The Vamps; LostBoy; Jordan Riley; Jack & Coke

The Vamps chronology
Missing You (2019)	Cherry Blossom (2020)	Collabs by Brad (2022)

The Vamps studio album chronology
Night & Day (Day Edition) (2018)	Cherry Blossom (2020)

Singles from Cherry Blossom
- 1. "Married in Vegas" Released: 31 July 2020; 2. "Chemicals" Released: 10 September 2020; 3. "Better" Released: 2 October 2020; 4. "Would You" Released: 4 April 2021

Professional ratings
Review scores
Source	Rating
AllMusic	4/5 stars
The Times	2/5 stars

Cherry Blossom is the fifth studio album by the British pop rock band the Vamps. It was released on 16 October 2020 via EMI Records, and includes the single "Married in Vegas". The album debuted atop the UK Albums Chart, becoming the Vamps' second number-one album in their home country. It is promoted by a concert tour that begun on 6 September 2021.

== Background ==
The band wrote "half an album quickly" 18 months before the release of the album, in early 2019, but scrapped all of the planned material and started over. Early in 2020, the band sent their completed album to their label, believing that they had a strong collection of "bangers and ballads" to mark what they regarded as the second part of their career, using the cherry blossom title and imagery as a symbol of "rebirth", but they were not entirely certain about which song should be released as the lead single.

== Singles ==
"Married in Vegas" was released as the lead single from the album on 31 July 2020. Its release was accompanied by an official music video posted to The Vamps' YouTube channel, directed by Dean Sherwood.

== Track listing ==
Cherry Blossom track listing
No.	Title	Writer(s)	Producer(s)	Length
1.	"Glory Days (Intro)"	Bradley Simpson; James McVey; Connor Ball; Tristan Evans; James Abrahart; Jordan Riley	Riley	0:14
2.	"Glory Days"	Simpson; McVey; Ball; Evans; Abrahart; Riley	Riley	3:26
3.	"Better"	Simpson; Peter Rycroft; Jakob Hazell; Svante Halldin	LostBoy; Jack & Coke	2:25
4.	"Married in Vegas"	Simpson; McVey; Ball; Evans; Rycroft	LostBoy	3:12
5.	"Chemicals"	Simpson; McVey; Ball; Evans; Tom Mann; Rycroft	LostBoy	2:50
6.	"Would You"	Simpson	Simpson; Evans^{[a]}	3:01
7.	"Bitter"	Simpson; McVey; Ball; Evans; Abrahart	Simpson; Evans^{[a]}	2:57
8.	"Part of Me"	Simpson; McVey; Ball; Evans; Rycroft	Simpson; LostBoy	3:11
9.	"Protocol"	Simpson; McVey; Ball; Evans	Simpson; Evans^{[a]}	3:54
10.	"Nothing but You"	Simpson; McVey; Ball; Evans; Rycroft	LostBoy	3:10
11.	"Treading Water"	Simpson; McVey; Ball; Evans	Simpson; Evans^{[a]}	3:47
Total length:				32:07

Japanese edition bonus track
No.	Title	Length
12.	"Married in Vegas" (acoustic)	3:32
Total length:		35:52

Extended, Pt. 1
No.	Title	Writer(s)	Producer(s)	Length
12.	"Married in Vegas" (acoustic)	Simpson; McVey; Ball; Evans; Rycroft	Ball; Evans	3:37
13.	"Better" (acoustic)	Simpson; Rycroft; Hazell; Halldin	Simpson; Ball; Evans	2:34
14.	"Glory Days" (acoustic)	Simpson; McVey; Ball; Evans; Abrahart; Riley	Simpson	4:04
Total length:				42:20

Extended, Pt. 2
No.	Title	Writer(s)	Producer(s)	Length
15.	"Would You" (acoustic)	Simpson	Simpson; Evans	3:19
16.	"Chemicals" (acoustic)	Simpson; McVey; Ball; Evans; Mann; Rycroft	Simpson; Ball	2:57
17.	"Treading Water" (acoustic)	Simpson; McVey; Ball; Evans	Simpson	2:57
Total length:				51:33

== Personnel ==
- Bradley Simpson – lead vocals, songwriter, bass, guitar, backing vocals (all tracks)
- Tristan Evans – lead guitar, songwriter, drums, producer, programming, backing vocals (all tracks)
- Connor Ball – songwriter, bass guitar, backing vocals (all tracks)
- James McVey – bass, songwriter, engineer, guitar, piano, producer, programming, recording, backing vocals (all tracks)
- James Abrahart – songwriter, backing vocals
- Luke Burgoyne – mixing assistant
- Dan Grech-Marguerat – mixing, programmer
- Svante Halldin – songwriter
- Stuart Hawkes – mastering engineer
- Jakob Hazell – songwriter
- Charles Hicks – mixing assistant
- Jack & Coke – bass, guitar, keyboards, piano, producer, programming, recording, strings
- Lostboy – bass, drum programming, keyboards, producer, programming, recording
- Tom Mann – songwriter
- Jordan Riley – bass, composer, drums, guitar, keyboards, piano, producer, programming, recording, backing vocals
- Peter Rycroft – songwriter

== Charts ==
Chart performance of Cherry Blossom
Chart (2020)	Peak position
Belgian Albums (Ultratop Flanders)	77
Dutch Albums (Album Top 100)	14
Irish Albums (OCC)	9
Japanese Albums (Oricon)	77
Scottish Albums (OCC)	1
Spanish Albums (PROMUSICAE)	63
UK Albums (OCC)	1

== See also ==
- List of UK Albums Chart number ones of the 2020s
