= Mike Perry (DJ) =

Swedish DJ and music producer

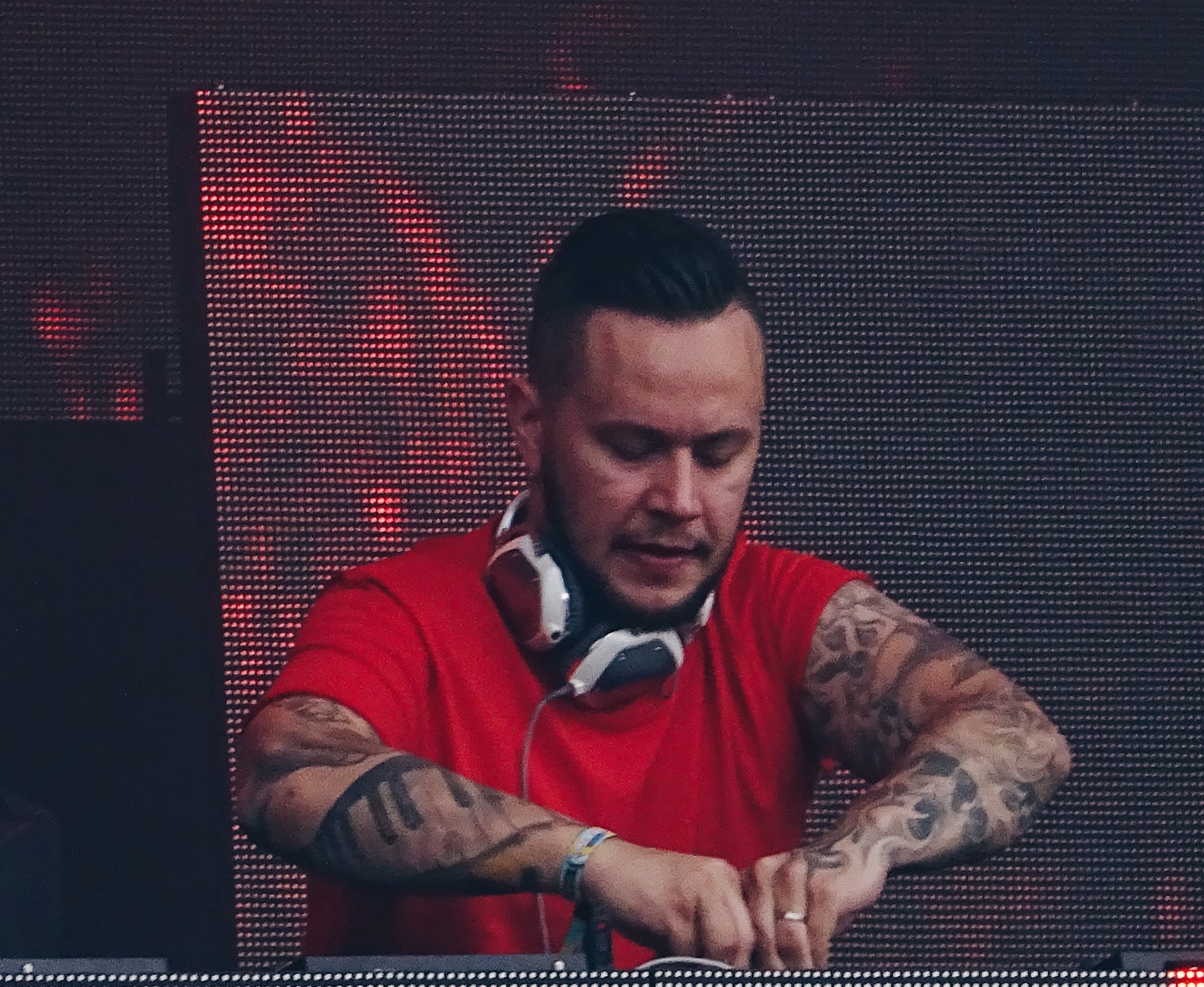
- Perry at Lollapalooza 2017

Background information
- Birth name: Mikael Mats Robert Persson
- Born: 24 June 1983 (age 42)
- Origin: Skövde, Sweden
- Genres: Techno; tropical house; dance; pop; future bass
- Occupations: DJ; music producer
- Years active: 2006–present
- Labels: Sony Music; DF Records

Mikael Mats Robert Persson (born 24 June 1983), better known by his stage name Mike Perry, is a Swedish DJ and music producer from Skövde. He is best known for his 2016 single "The Ocean" featuring vocals from Shy Martin, which peaked at number 1 on the Swedish Singles Chart. Other popular songs by Perry include "Inside the Lines", "Stay Young" and "Don't Hide".

== Career ==
=== 2012–2015: Beginnings ===
In 2007, Perry released "Psycadelic" with Stephan M. In 2012, Perry released "Put Me Up", an electronic dance music production on the Mark Brown label, and released on CR2 Records. This was followed by a collaboration with Cecilia Axeland called "We Don't Sleep in the Night" as well as "Whompin" with Filip Jenven. In 2013, Perry began releasing music in a "big room" style. Also in 2013, Miriam Bryant's "Push & Play" was remixed by Filip Jenven and Mike Perry. Perry released several pieces of music from 2013 to 2016.

=== 2016: Breakthrough with "The Ocean" ===
After playing a track called "The Ocean", Sony Music Entertainment signed him up to their label. On 15 April 2016 the track was released, featuring vocals from Shy Martin. The song peaked at number 1 on the Swedish Singles Chart, also reaching the Top 10 in Austria, Finland, Germany, the Netherlands, Norway, Poland and Switzerland as well as the Top 20 in, Australia, Belgium, Denmark, France and Ireland as well as the Top 40 in Italy, New Zealand, Portugal and United Kingdom.

The follow-up single "Inside the Lines" was released on 21 October 2016. The track features vocals by Casso and reached number 19 in Finland and number 25 in Sweden. His third tropical house release in 2016 was the track "Touching You Again". It was produced with newcomers Hot Shade and Jane XØ as well as singer Phoebe Ryan. On 15 May 2017, Perry announced his upcoming single "Hands" featuring American singer Sabrina Carpenter and British boy band The Vamps, which was released later in the month.

Perry released more singles going into 2018 including "California" featuring Hot Shade and Karlyn and "Don't Hide" with Willemijn May, which number 35 and 31 on the Swedish charts respectively.

On 18 January 2019, Perry released "Runaway", peaking #1 position in United States, Chile and Hungary.

In 2019, Perry released the single "Changes" with fellow DJs Ten Times and Dmitri Vangelis and Wyman with vocals from The Companions which reached number 65 in Sweden.

== Discography ==
=== Singles ===
Year	Title	Peak chart positions										Certifications	Album
Year	Title	SWE	AUS	AUT	DEN	GER	NL	NOR	NZ	SWI	UK	Certifications	Album
2016	"The Ocean" (featuring Shy Martin)	1	11	4	13	5	10	3	32	4	39	GLF: 6× Platinum; ARIA: 2× Platinum; BPI: Gold; BVMI: 3× Gold; IFPI AUT: Gold; IFPI DEN: 2× Platinum; RMNZ: 2× Platinum	Non-album singles
2016	"Inside the Lines" (featuring Casso)	25	—	—	—	—	—	34	—	84	—	GLF: 2× Platinum	Non-album singles
2016	"Touching You Again" (with Hot Shade and Jane XØ)	—	—	—	—	—	—	—	—	—	—		Non-album singles
2017	"Talk About It" (with Hot Shade)	40	—	—	—	—	—	—	—	—	—	GLF: Platinum	Non-album singles
2017	"Body to Body" (with Imani Williams)	56	—	—	—	—	—	—	—	—	—	GLF: Gold	Non-album singles
2017	"Hands" (with The Vamps and Sabrina Carpenter)	70	—	—	—	—	—	—	—	—	— (Note: "Hands" did not enter the UK Singles Chart, but peaked at number 58 on the UK Singles Download Chart and at number 59 on the UK Singles Sales Chart.)	GLF: Gold	Night & Day (Night Edition)
2017	"Stay Young" (with Tessa)	39	—	—	—	—	—	—	—	—	—	GLF: Platinum	Non-album singles
2018	"Rocksteady" (with DIMA)	—	—	—	—	—	—	—	—	—	—		Non-album singles
2018	"California" (with Hot Shade featuring Karlyn)	27	—	—	—	—	—	—	—	—	—		Non-album singles
2018	"Don't Hide" (with Willemijn May)	31	—	—	—	—	—	—	—	—	—		Non-album singles
2018	"Rise & Fall" (featuring Cathrine Lassen)	— (Note: "Rise & Fall" did not enter the Swedish Singellista Chart, but peaked at number three on the Swedish Heatseeker Chart.)	—	—	—	—	—	—	—	—	—		Non-album singles
2018	"Lighthouse" (with Hot Shade featuring René Miller)	— (Note: "Lighthouse" did not enter the Swedish Singellista Chart, but peaked at number three on the Swedish Heatseeker Chart.)	—	—	—	—	—	—	— (Note: "Lighthouse" did not enter the NZ Top 40 Singles Chart, but peaked at number 39 on the NZ Hot Singles Chart.)	—	—		Non-album singles
2019	"Runaway"	—	—	—	—	—	—	—	—	—	—		Non-album singles
2019	"Way Too High"	—	—	—	—	—	—	—	—	—	—		Non-album singles
2019	"Closer" (with Sonic Avenue and Hot Shade featuring Mikayla)	—	—	—	—	—	—	—	—	—	—		Non-album singles
2019	"Changes" (with Dimitri Vangelis & Wyman and Ten Times featuring The Companions)	65	—	—	—	—	—	—	—	—	—	GLF: Platinum	Non-album singles
2019	"Moves" (with Hot Shade and Mika Zibanejad)	—	—	—	—	—	—	—	—	—	—		Non-album singles
2019	"Bloodshot" (featuring Charlotte Haining)	—	—	—	—	—	—	—	—	—	—		Non-album singles
2019	"All Star" (with Ten Times and Hot Shade featuring WhoisFiyah)	—	—	—	—	—	—	—	—	—	—		Non-album singles
2019	"One Life"	—	—	—	—	—	—	—	—	—	—		Non-album singles
2019	"Better Than This" (featuring David Rasmussen)	—	—	—	—	—	—	—	—	—	—		Non-album singles
2019	"Until I Die" (featuring Joe Buck)	—	—	—	—	—	—	—	—	—	—		Non-album singles
2019	"Dive" (with Hot Shade and Chris James)	—	—	—	—	—	—	—	—	—	—		Non-album singles
2020	"Told You So" (featuring Orange Villa)	— (Note: "Told You So" did not enter the Swedish Singellista Chart, but peaked at number 18 on the Swedish Heatseeker Chart.)	—	—	—	—	—	—	—	—	—		Non-album singles
2020	"Paradise" (with Mangoo and Wanja Janeva)	—	—	—	—	—	—	—	—	—	—		Non-album singles
2020	"Maze" (with Mangoo featuring Wanja Janeva)	—	—	—	—	—	—	—	—	—	—		Non-album singles
2020	"Coming Home" (with Dimitri Vangelis & Wyman)	—	—	—	—	—	—	—	—	—	—		Non-album singles
2020	"Midnight Sun" (featuring Forgét Mej)	—	—	—	—	—	—	—	—	—	—		Non-album singles
2020	"Down the Line" (featuring Ten Times)	—	—	—	—	—	—	—	—	—	—		Non-album singles
2020	"Crazy" (featuring Nathaniel)	—	—	—	—	—	—	—	—	—	—		Non-album singles
2020	"By Your Side"	—	—	—	—	—	—	—	—	—	—		Non-album singles
2021	"If I Ruled the World" (featuring Mila Josef)	—	—	—	—	—	—	—	—	—	—		Non-album singles
2021	"Save Me Now" (featuring Isak Danielson)	—	—	—	—	—	—	—	—	—	—		Non-album singles
2021	"Looking At U"	—	—	—	—	—	—	—	—	—	—		Non-album singles
2022	"Late Nights"	—	—	—	—	—	—	—	—	—	—		Non-album singles
2023	"Turn Off the Lights"	—	—	—	—	—	—	—	—	—	—		Non-album singles
2023	"Hustler of the Heart" (with Ryan Edmond)	—	—	—	—	—	—	—	—	—	—		Non-album singles
2023	"On My Body" (with Bjørnskov & Hot Shade)	—	—	—	—	—	—	—	—	—	—		Non-album singles
2023	"Believe"	—	—	—	—	—	—	—	—	—	—		Non-album singles
2023	"Thieves" (featuring JXN)	—	—	—	—	—	—	—	—	—	—		Non-album singles
2024	"Trails"	—	—	—	—	—	—	—	—	—	—		Non-album singles
2024	"Love Me Like That"	—	—	—	—	—	—	—	—	—	—		Non-album singles
2024	"Broken Heart" (featuring One Trick Pony)	—	—	—	—	—	—	—	—	—	—		Non-album singles
"—" denotes a recording that did not chart or was not released in that territory.

=== Other releases ===
Year	Title
2007	"Psychadelic" (with Stephan M featuring Vanity)
2007	"Arctic Sweep" (vs. Dreas)
2012	"Put Me Up"
2012	"We Don't Sleep in the Night" (with Cecilia Axeland)
2012	"Whompin" (with Filip Jenven)
2012	"Train" (with Kastenholt & Dee featuring Maegan Cottone)
2016	"Touching You Again" (with Hot Shade featuring Jane XØ)

=== Remixes ===
Year	Title	Original artist(s)
2007	"Fuckin' Voices" (with Stephan M)	Distorded
2007	"Give Some Love" (with Stephan M)	Antoine Clamaran & Mario Ochoa (featuring Lulu Hughes)
2012	"Champion"	Clement Marfo & The Frontline
2012	"Looking for Love"	Nilson & The 8th Note (featuring Fenja)
2013	"Last Day On Earth"	Michael Woods
2013	"You Give Me Life"	NARK (featuring Neil Ormandy)
2013	"Push Play" (with Filip Jenven)	Miriam Bryant
2013	"Last Soul on Earth" (with Filip Jenven)	Miriam Bryant
2013	"All Night" (with Filip Jenven)	Icona Pop
2015	"Carry You Home" (with Filip Jenven)	Zara Larsson
2017	"Perfect"	Ed Sheeran
2017	"Cold" (with Hot Shade)	Maroon 5

== Awards and nominations ==
Awards
Year	Award	Category	Nominated work	Result
2017	P3 Guld	Song Of The Year	The Ocean	Nominated
2017	Grammis	Song Of The Year	The Ocean	Nominated
