= Just My Type (song) =

Single by The Vamps

from the album Night & Day (Day Edition)
- Released: 15 June 2018
- Recorded: 2017–2018
- Length: 3:31
- Label: Sony Music Entertainment
- Songwriters: Connor Ball; Tristan Evans; James McVey; Brad Simpson; Alexander James; Iain Farquharson; James Abrahart; Philip Plested; Jacob Manson; Tobias Tripp; Dale Anthoni
- Producer: Jacob Manson

The Vamps singles chronology
"Hair Too Long" (2018)	"Just My Type" (2018)	"We Don't Care" (2018)

"Just My Type" is a song by British pop rock band The Vamps. The song was released as a digital download on 15 June 2018 through Sony Music Entertainment. It serves as the fourth single from their third studio album Night & Day, being included on the second part of it, called Day Edition.

== Music video ==
A music video to accompany the release of "Just My Type" was first released onto YouTube on 9 July 2018 at a total length of three minutes and thirty-eight seconds. The video shows the band hanging out and spending some time together when a girl catches Brad's eye because she is just his type. Then they start to date and he spends time with her, when, he realizes that she gives him good things and makes him happy, but she can also bring bad things, and as the story keeps going on, this becomes more noticeable. At the end, the whole story goes back to the beginning of the video and he decides to ignore the girl.

== Track listing ==
Digital download
No.	Title	Length
1.	"Just My Type"	3:31

Digital download
No.	Title	Length
1.	"Just My Type" (Danny Dove & Offset Remix)	3:28

Digital download
No.	Title	Length
1.	"Just My Type" (Nathan Jain Remix)	3:09

Digital download
No.	Title	Length
1.	"Just My Type" (Acoustic)	3:47

== Charts ==
Chart (2018)	Peak position
Scottish Singles Sales (Official Charts)	45

== Certifications ==
Region	Certification	Certified units/sales
Brazil (Pro-Música Brasil)	Gold	20,000^{‡}
New Zealand (RMNZ)	Gold	15,000^{‡}
^{‡} Sales+streaming figures based on certification alone.

== Release history ==
Region	Date	Format	Label
United Kingdom	15 June 2018	Digital download	Sony Music Entertainment
