= I Found a Girl (The Vamps song) =

Single by the Vamps featuring Omi

from the album Wake Up
- Released: 1 April 2016
- Recorded: 2015
- Genre: Pop rock
- Length: 2:59 (solo version); 2:58 (featuring Omi)
- Label: Mercury; Virgin EMI
- Songwriter(s): Steve Mac; Ammar Malik; Ross Golan; Claude Kelly; James Blunt; Brad Simpson; Connor Ball; Tristan Evans; James McVey
- Producer(s): Steve Mac

The Vamps singles chronology
"Rest Your Love" (2015)	"I Found a Girl" (2016)	"Beliya" (2016)

Omi singles chronology
"Drop in the Ocean" (2016)	"I Found a Girl" (2016)	"Seasons" (2017)

Music video
- "I Found a Girl" on YouTube

"I Found a Girl" is a song by British pop band the Vamps featuring guest vocals from Jamaican singer Omi. It was released on 1 April 2016 as the third single from their second studio album Wake Up (2015). The solo version of the song was earlier released as the third promotional single of the album on 27 November 2015. The song is about a man falling in love with a lesbian.

== Music video ==
The music video follows each of the Vamps finding a girl to make a lesbian girl band version of themselves. In order of appearance in the video; Tristan finds Jordan Gonzalez, Connor finds Porscia Eve, James finds Emma Maddock and Brad finds Jessica Digi.

== Track listing ==
- Digital download
1. "I Found a Girl" (featuring Omi) – 2:58
- Digital download – Acoustic version
1. "I Found a Girl" (Acoustic) (featuring Omi) – 3:04
- Digital download – Live single
1. "I Found a Girl" (Live from the Mall of Asia) – 3:05
- CD1
1. "I Found a Girl" (featuring Omi) – 2:59
2. "Words (Don't Mean a Thing)" – 3:19
3. "Cheater" (Live from the Mall of Asia)
4. "Rest Your Love" (Fred Faulke Remix)
- CD2
1. "I Found a Girl" (Live from European Fanfests Tour 2015)
2. "Kung Fu Fighting"
- Single DVD
1. Dean footage
2. "I Found a Girl" (Original version)

== Charts ==
Chart (2016)	Peak position
Ireland (IRMA)	63
Poland (Polish Airplay Top 100)	6
Scotland (OCC)	12
UK Singles (OCC)	30

== Certifications ==
Region	Certification	Certified units/sales
United Kingdom (BPI)	Silver	200,000^{‡}
^{‡} Sales+streaming figures based on certification alone.

== Release history ==
Region	Date	Format	Version	Label	Ref.
Worldwide	27 November 2015 (Note: Release as a promotional single.)	Digital download	Original	Mercury; Virgin EMI Records	
Worldwide	1 April 2016	Digital download	Omi Remix	Mercury; Virgin EMI Records	
Philippines	1 April 2016	Digital download	Live from the Mall of Asia	Mercury; Virgin EMI Records	
United Kingdom	1 April 2016	Digital download	Acoustic version	Mercury; Virgin EMI Records	
United Kingdom	15 April 2016	Contemporary hit radio	Omi Remix	Mercury; Virgin EMI Records	
