= All Night (The Vamps and Matoma song) =

Single by The Vamps and Matoma

from the album Night & Day (Night Edition)
- Released: 14 October 2016
- Recorded: 2016
- Genre: EDM
- Length: 3:16
- Label: Mercury; Virgin EMI
- Songwriters: Brad Simpson; James McVey; Connor Ball; Tristan Evans; Justin Franks; John Mitchell; Daniel Majic
- Producers: DJ Frank E; Danny Majic; Matoma

The Vamps singles chronology
"Beliya" (2016)	"All Night" (2016)	"Middle of the Night" (2017)

Matoma singles chronology
"False Alarm" (2016)	"All Night" (2016)	"Heart Won't Forget" (2017)

Music video
- "All Night" on YouTube

"All Night" is a song by British band The Vamps and Norwegian DJ Matoma, released on 14 October 2016. The Vamps released a preview of the song on 12 October 2016. It was later added to the BBC Radio 1 A-list. It serves as the first single from their third studio album Night & Day, being included on the first part of it, called Night Edition. It is also their first Platinum-certified release in the UK. It was later included on Matoma's second album, One in a Million (2018).

== Background ==
"All Night" is an EDM song written by the Vamps, Justin Franks, Danny Majic and John Mitchell and produced by DJ Frank E, Danny Majic, and Matoma. In an interview for 1883 Magazine, guitarist James McVey said: "It's a song that we did with a guy called Frank E who’s a producer in LA and it was created on two trips there. First of all, he sent the idea of the chorus, and it sounds like it’s being sung by children but it’s pitched up so it’s like that kind of sample almost. Then Brad and I went for the first trip, we did some verses and then Connor went later with Brad. Tristan’s been working on it, helping and advising production-wise because he does production, so, it's a song that’s been happening over the past few months. It started really with that chorus and we wrote around it". Lyrically, "It's about a nostalgia, not like you've split up with someone but when you're apart you're thinking about them. In the verses, it also subtly hints at the fact that the person has helped you become a better person and helped you in difficult times", he explained.

The announcement of the release date of the song was made on 7 October 2016, through Capital FM.

The song was previously released on Capital FM on 13 October 2016 and officially released the next day. On 16 October 2016, it was announced that the bundle of the single would be released on 4 November 2016, containing two CDs and a digital download.

== Track listing ==
- Digital download – single
1. "All Night" – 3:17
2. "All Night" (featuring Astrid S) – 3:16
- Digital download – acoustic version
1. "All Night" (acoustic) – 3:03
- Digital download – Remix
1. "All Night" (Alex Adair Remix) – 3:33
- Digital download – Live
1. "All Night" (live from the Teen Awards)
- CD1
1. "All Night" – 3:17
2. "Scars" – 3:46
3. "Hideaway" – 3:04
4. "Cheater" (live from the O2 Arena)
- CD2
1. "All Night" (acoustic version) – 3:03
2. "Talk Show" – 3:04

== Charts ==
=== Weekly charts ===
Chart (2016–17)	Peak position
Australia (ARIA)	41
Austria (Ö3 Austria Top 40)	55
Belgium (Ultratip Bubbling Under Flanders)	5
Belgium (Ultratip Bubbling Under Wallonia)	15
Canada Hot 100 (Billboard)	72
Czech Republic Singles Digital (ČNS IFPI)	23
Denmark (Tracklisten)	25
Germany (GfK)	60
Hungary (Single Top 40)	34
Ireland (IRMA)	6
Italy (FIMI)	41
Netherlands (Single Top 100)	41
New Zealand (Recorded Music NZ)	12
Norway (VG-lista)	13
Portugal (AFP)	44
Russia Airplay (Tophit)	193
Scotland Singles (OCC)	8
Slovakia Singles Digital (ČNS IFPI)	24
Sweden (Sverigetopplistan)	13
Switzerland (Schweizer Hitparade)	63
UK Singles (OCC)	24

=== Year-end charts ===
Chart (2017)	Position
Denmark (Tracklisten)	96
Hungary (Stream Top 40)	64
Sweden (Sverigetopplistan)	62

== Certifications ==
Region	Certification	Certified units/sales
Australia (ARIA)	Gold	35,000^{‡}
Brazil (Pro-Música Brasil)	Platinum	60,000^{‡}
Canada (Music Canada)	Platinum	80,000^{‡}
Denmark (IFPI Danmark)	Platinum	90,000^{‡}
Germany (BVMI)	Gold	200,000^{‡}
Italy (FIMI)	Platinum	50,000^{‡}
New Zealand (RMNZ)	3× Platinum	90,000^{‡}
Norway (IFPI Norway)	2× Platinum	80,000^{‡}
Sweden (GLF)	Gold	20,000^{‡}
United Kingdom (BPI)	Platinum	600,000^{‡}
United States (RIAA)	Gold	500,000^{‡}
^{‡} Sales+streaming figures based on certification alone.
