= Wake Up (The Vamps album) =

Studio album by the Vamps
- Released: 27 November 2015
- Recorded: 2015
- Genre: Pop; pop rock
- Length: 40:51
- Label: Virgin EMI
- Producer: Connor Ball; Tristan Evans; Carl Falk; Steve Mac; Ammar Malik; Matt Prime; Metrophonic; Tobias Karlsson; Kevin Snevely; Red Triangle; Rami Yacoub; Jay Reynolds

The Vamps chronology
Somebody to You (2014)	Wake Up (2015)	Night & Day (2017)

The Vamps studio album chronology
Meet the Vamps (2014)	Wake Up (2015)	Night & Day (2017)

Singles from Wake Up
- 1. "Wake Up" Released: 2 October 2015; 2. "Rest Your Love" Released: 27 November 2015; 3. "I Found a Girl" Released: 1 April 2016

Wake Up is the second studio album by British pop band the Vamps. It was released on 27 November 2015. It debuted and peaked at number 10 on the UK Albums Chart and has been certified Gold.

Professional ratings
Review scores
Source	Rating
The Guardian	2/5 stars

== Singles ==
- "Wake Up" was released on 2 October 2015 as the album's lead single.
- "Rest Your Love" was released as the second single of the album on 27 November 2015.
- "I Found a Girl" was announced as the third single of the album and was released on 1 April 2016. The Vamps also announced on their Twitter that there would be a new version of the song featuring a surprise artist. They later confirmed the featuring artist would be OMI. The original version of the song had been previously released as a promotional single on 23 November 2015.

=== Promotional singles ===
- "Cheater" was released as the first countdown single of the album on 13 October 2015. A promotional video was also released in the same day on the band's Vevo account.
- "Stolen Moments" was released as the second countdown single of the album on 4 November 2015 along with a lyric video on their YouTube channel.

== World tour ==
The Wake Up World Tour began in January 2016 and passed across 18 countries in 4 continents. The support acts include The Tide (all dates), Hometown (UK and Ireland), Conor Maynard (UK), New Hope Club (UK and Ireland), Tyde Levi (Australia), Little Sea (Australia), At Sunset (Australia) Before You Exit (Philippines), William Singe (Philippines), and Jayda Avanzado (Philippines).

== Track listing ==
Wake Up – Standard edition
No.	Title	Writer(s)	Producer(s)	Length
1.	"Wake Up"	Steve Mac; Ross Golan; Ammar Malik	Steve Mac; Ammar Malik; Kevin Snevely	3:12
2.	"Rest Your Love"	Rami Yacoub; Carl Falk; Savan Kotecha; Shellback	Carl Falk; Rami Yacoub	3:16
3.	"Volcano" (featuring Silentó)	Mac; Malik; Wayne Hector; Richard Hawk	Mac	3:18
4.	"Million Words"	Bradley Simpson; James McVey; Connor Ball; Tristan Evans; Alex Smith; Samuel Preston; Jonny Coffer	Metrophonic	3:42
5.	"Windmills"	Simpson; McVey; Ball; Evans; Mac; Malik	Mac	3:05
6.	"Stolen Moments"	Simpson; McVey; Ball; Evans; Hector; Matt Prime	Matt Prime	4:09
7.	"I Found a Girl"	Simpson; McVey; Ball; Evans; Mac; Malik; Golan; Claude Kelly; James Blunt	Mac	2:59
8.	"Be with You"	Simpson; McVey; Ball; Evans; Mac; Malik	Mac	3:11
9.	"Burn"	Simpson; McVey; Ball; Evans; Joe O'Neill	Jay Reynolds	3:38
10.	"Cheater"	Simpson; McVey; Ball; Evans; George Tizzard; Rick Parkhouse; Ed Drewett	Red Triangle	3:14
11.	"Boy Without a Car"	Simpson; McVey; Ball; Evans; Tizzard; Parkhouse	Red Triangle	3:29
12.	"Held by Me"	Johan Carlsson; Golan	Tobias Karlsson	3:38
Total length:				40:51

Wake Up – Deluxe edition (bonus tracks)
No.	Title	Writer(s)	Producer(s)	Length
13.	"Half Way There"	McVey; Evans; Simpson; Ball; Hector; Prime	Prime; Phil Cook^{[a]}	3:11
14.	"Runaway"	McVey; Evans; Simpson; Ball	Red Triangle	3:18
15.	"Worry"	Simpson; McVey; Evans; Ball	Reynolds	3:36
16.	"Coming Home"	Simpson; McVey; Evans; Ball	Tristan Evans	4:54
17.	"Peace of Mind"	McVey; Simpson; Evans; Ball	Reynolds	3:05
18.	"Written Off"	Ball; McVey; Evans; Simpson	Connor Ball	3:17
Total length:				62:12

Wake Up – Italian edition (bonus tracks)
No.	Title	Writer(s)	Producer(s)	Length
19.	"Wake Up" (Italian version)	Mac; Golan; Malik	Mac; Malik; Snevely	3:13
20.	"Volcano" (featuring Moreno)	Mac; Malik; Hector	Mac	3:19
Total length:				68:44

Wake Up – Japanese version (bonus tracks)
No.	Title	Writer(s)	Producer(s)	Length
19.	"Words (Don't Mean a Thing)"	Ball; Evans; McVey; Simpson; Paul Barry; Mark Bates; Patrick Mascall		3:12
20.	"Stay Here"	Ball; Evans; McVey; Simpson	Simpson	3:51
21.	"Wake Up" (acoustic version)	Mac; Golan; Malik	Mac; Malik; Snevely	4:04
22.	"Risk It All" (Live at The O2 Arena)	Ball; Evans; McVey; Simpson; Hector; Prime	Prime	5:30
Total length:				78:49

Wake Up – DVD: The Vamps Live at The O2 Arena
No.	Title	Length
1.	"Intro" (Live)
2.	"Wild Heart" (Live)
3.	"Hurricane" (Live)
4.	"Somebody to You" (Live)
5.	"Uptown Funk"/"Seven Nation Army"/"Shake It Off"/"We Can't Stop" (Live)
6.	"Last Night" (Live)
7.	"Move My Way" (Live)
8.	"In Too Deep" (Live)
9.	"Teenagers" (Live)
10.	"Another World" (Live)
11.	"Lovestruck" (Live)
12.	"Girls on TV" (Live)
13.	"Oh Cecilia (Breaking My Heart)" (Live)
14.	"Risk It All" (Live)
15.	"Can We Dance" (Live)

Wake Up — North American Standard edition
No.	Title	Length
1.	"Wake Up"	3:12
2.	"Rest Your Love"	3:16
3.	"Volcano" (featuring Silentó)	3:18
4.	"Million Words"	3:42
5.	"Windmills"	3:05
6.	"I Found a Girl"	2:59
7.	"Be with You"	3:11
8.	"Burn"	3:38
9.	"Cheater"	3:14
10.	"Stolen Moments"	4:09
11.	"Boy Without a Car"	3:29
12.	"Worry"	3:36
Total length:		40:49

Wake Up — North American Deluxe edition (bonus tracks)
No.	Title	Length
13.	"Held by Me"	3:38
14.	"Peace of Mind"	3:05
15.	"Coming Home"	4:54
Total length:		52:26

Notes

- Credits adapted from album liner notes
- ^{^[a]} signifies an additional producer

== Personnel ==
Credits adapted from the liner notes of Wake Up (Deluxe Version).

The Vamps

- Bradley Simpson - lead and backing vocals (all tracks), rhythm guitar (track 2)
- Connor Ball - bass guitar, backing vocals, lead vocals (1, 15, 17–18), additional vocals (track 8)
- James McVey - lead guitar, backing vocals, lead vocals (track 2), additional vocals (track 10)
- Tristan Evans - drums, backing vocals

Performers

- Ammar Malik – additional backing vocals (1, 3, 5, 8)
- Ross Golan – additional backing vocals (1, 7)
- Steve Mac – additional backing vocals (1), keyboards (1, 3, 5, 7, 8), strings (3)
- Paul Gendler – guitar (1, 7, 8), additional guitar (3, 5)
- Chris Laws – additional drums (1, 3, 5, 7, 8)
- Carl Falk – guitars (2), programming (2), additional backing vocals (2)
- Rami Yacoub – bass (2), programming (2), additional backing vocals (2)
- Savan Kotecha – additional backing vocals (2)
- Tobias Karlsson – keyboards (12), programming (12), guitar (12), bass (12)
- Shellback – additional backing vocals (2)
- Thrice Noble – additional programming (12)
- Kristoffer Fogelmark – additional backing vocals (2)
- Albin Nedler – additional backing vocals (2)
- Wayne Hector – additional backing vocals (3)
- Silento – vocals (3)
- Alex Smith – keyboards (4), programming (4)
- Matt Furmidge – keyboards (4), programming (4)
- Jay Reynolds – keyboards (9, 15, 17), programming (9, 15, 17)
- Rick Parkhouse – percussion (11, 14)
- George Tizzard – percussion (11, 14), keyboards (11, 14)
- Johan Carlsson – keyboards (12), programming (12)
- Matt Prime – programming (13)
- Phil Cook – additional programming (6)

Production and recording

- Steve Mac – production (1, 3, 5, 7, 8)
- Ammar Malik – production (1)
- Kevin Snevely – production (1)
- Daniel Pursey – engineering (1, 3, 5, 7, 8)
- Chris Laws – engineering (1, 3, 5, 7, 8), mixing (5, 7, 8)
- John Hanes – assistant mix engineering (1, 2, 3, 12)
- Serban Ghenea – mixing (1, 2, 3, 12)
- Carl Falk – production (2)
- Rami Yacoub – production (2)
- Thomas Cullison – engineering (2)
- Metrophonic – production (4)
- Alex Smith – engineering (4)
- Matt Furmidge – engineering (4)
- Dom Liu – engineering (4)
- Michael Brauer – engineering (4)
- Matt Prime – production (6, 13), mixing (6, 13)
- Phil Cook – additional production (13)
- Joe Zook – mixing (10)
- Jay Reynolds – production (9, 15, 17), mixing (9, 15, 17, 18)
- Red Triangle – production (10, 11, 14), mixing (11, 14)
- Rick Parkhouse – engineering (11, 14)
- Chester Barrett – engineering (11, 14)
- Tobias Karlsson – production (12)
- Noah Passovoy – vocal production (12), engineering (12)
- Tristan Evans – production (16), mixing (16)
- Connor Ball – production (18)

== Charts and certifications ==
=== Charts ===
Chart (2015)	Peak position
Australian Albums (ARIA)	23
Belgian Albums (Ultratop Flanders)	37
Belgian Albums (Ultratop Wallonia)	78
Dutch Albums (Album Top 100)	45
Irish Albums (IRMA)	17
Italian Albums (FIMI)	45
Taiwanese Albums (Five Music)	19
Scottish Albums (OCC)	6
Spanish Albums (PROMUSICAE)	23
UK Albums (OCC)	10
US Billboard 200	186

=== Certifications ===
Certifications for Wake Up
Region	Certification	Certified units/sales
United Kingdom (BPI)	Gold	100,000^{‡}
^{‡} Sales+streaming figures based on certification alone.

== Release formats ==
Standard edition

- 12 tracks

Deluxe edition

- 18 tracks

Limited edition (unavailable after Christmas 2015, only available with the world tour merchandising)

- CD – 18 tracks
- DVD: The Vamps Live at The O2 Arena

Limited Access All Areas edition

- CD – 18 tracks
- DVD: The Vamps Live at The O2 Arena
- Digital download – 18 tracks
- Unique online experience
- Curated music videos
- Social stream news updates
- Interactive booklet
- Lyric poster
- Art cards

== Release history ==
Region	Date	Format(s)	Label(s)	Edition(s)	Ref.
Australia	27 November 2015	CD; CD+DVD; Digital download	Virgin EMI	Standard; Deluxe	
Europe	27 November 2015	CD; CD+DVD; Digital download	Virgin EMI	Standard; Deluxe; Access All Areas	
North America	4 December 2015	CD; Digital download	Island	Standard; Deluxe	
