= New Hope Club =

British pop band

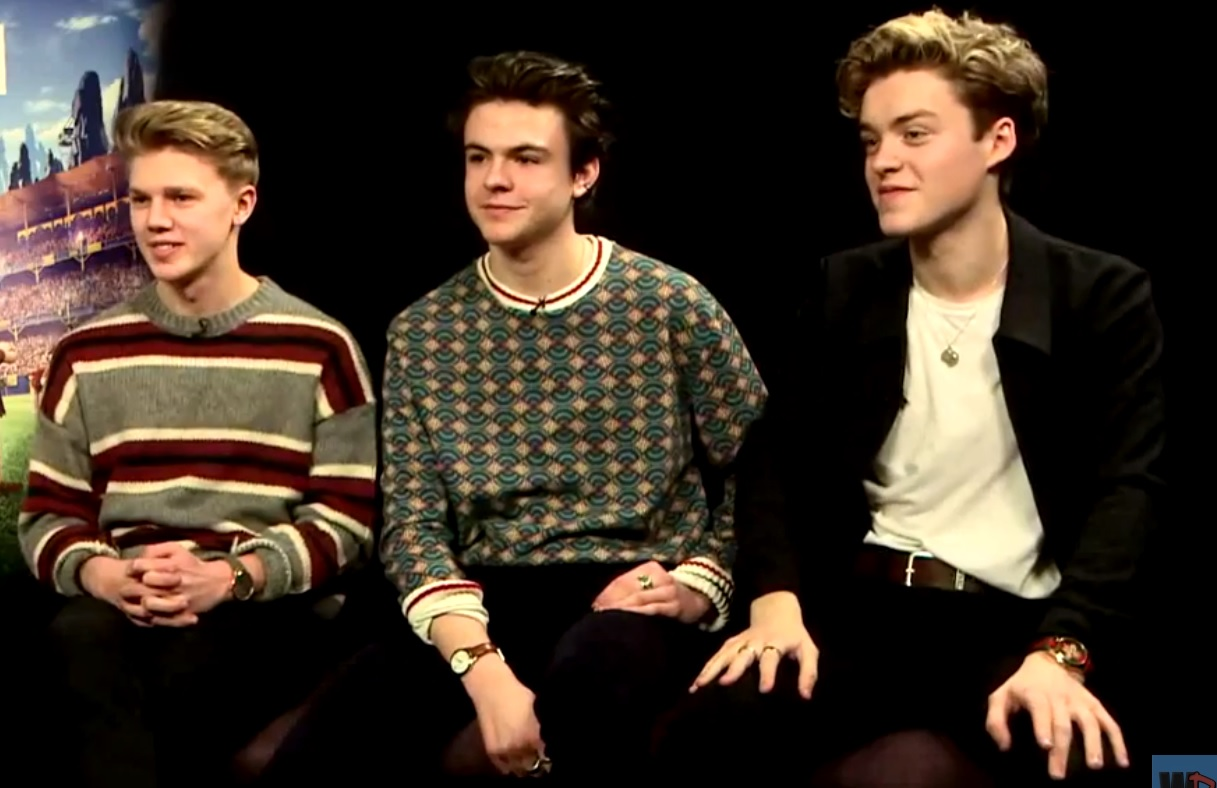
- New Hope Club in 2018. Left to right: George Smith, Blake Richardson, Reece Bibby.

Background information
- Also known as: NHC
- Origin: Manchester and London, England
- Genres: Pop; pop rock
- Years active: 2015–2025 (Note: Indefinite hiatus)
- Labels: Steady; Hollywood
- Past members: Reece Bibby; Blake Richardson; George Smith
- Website: www.newhopeclub.com

New Hope Club are a British pop trio formed in 2015, consisting of Reece Bibby, Blake Richardson, and George Smith. Their debut EP, Welcome to the Club, was released through Steady Records/Hollywood Records on 5 May 2017; the band released their self-titled debut album in February 2020, which peaked at number five on the UK Album Charts. On 4 February 2025, the band announced they would be going on a hiatus.

== History ==
George Smith and Blake Richardson formed New Hope Club in October 2015. As a member of the boy band Stereo Kicks, Reece Bibby appeared on the eleventh season of The X Factor in the UK in 2014, finishing fifth. Stereo Kicks broke up in July 2015 after failing to land a record deal; in November 2015, Bibby joined New Hope Club. Bibby, Smith, and Richardson are all originally from Northern England. New Hope Club's first recording was a cover of "Wake Up" by The Vamps in October 2015. In December 2015, The Vamps signed the band to their label Steady Records, a subsidiary of Virgin EMI Records. They were the second band signed to the label, after The Tide.

The band have supported the Vamps on three of their UK/Europe tours (2017, 2018, 2019) and performed a song each night ('Cecilia') on the Wake Up Tour (2016). They also accompanied The Vamps on their 2018 USA tour

New Hope Club's debut 4-song EP Welcome to the Club was released on Hollywood Records via Steady Records on 5 May 2017. The video for "Perfume" was released in January 2017, and the video for "Fixed" was released with their EP. The band spent 10 weeks on the Billboard Next Big Sound chart, peaking at number 5 on 16 September 2017. At the 2017 Teen Choice Awards, they were nominated for Choice Next Big Thing.

The band released the fourth and final music video of their EP, for the song "Water", on 6 October 2017.

A Christmas song called "Whoever He Is" was released along with a video on 1 December 2017.

The band played their first ever headlining shows at the O2 Shepherd's Bush Empire, in London, on the 1st and 2 June 2018. These shows were sold out and supported by acts such as Max & Harvey and RoadTrip. In early 2018, they released the music video for their single "Start Over Again" and two songs from the “Early Man” movie soundtrack ("Good Day" and "Tiger Feet”). In the summer of the same year, they also released the music video for their song, "Medicine." This was their fastest music video to reach 1 million views on YouTube. In October 2018, they released their second EP Welcome to the Club Pt. 2.

They released the single "Permission" on 1 February 2019, and the single "Love Again" on 3 May 2019.

In June 2022, they released the "Getting Better" and "Girl Who Does Both" multi-track single.

Blake Richardson made his onscreen debut as Paul McCartney in Midas Man, a feature film about The Beatles' manager Brian Epstein.

On 4 February 2025, the band announced they would be going on a hiatus.

== Touring ==
New Hope Club opened for The Vamps on their 2016 UK tour, and for their tour of the UK and Ireland in the spring of 2017. They regularly performed "Oh Cecilia (Breaking My Heart)" with The Vamps during that tour. They also opened for Tini Stoessel on her 2017 Got Me Started Tour in Germany. They have also opened for Sabrina Carpenter on her North American summer 2017 De-Tour, and opened yet again for The Vamps on their autumn 2017 tour in Australia. In August 2017, they performed at Arthur Ashe Kids' Day at Arthur Ashe Stadium in New York City. In the beginning of 2019 they did a special mini tour in Europe, doing shows in Paris, Amsterdam, Antwerp and Cologne. They embarked on their first ever world tour, the Love Again Tour, on 8 June 2019 in Manila, Philippines at the New Frontier Theater, continuing to Bangkok, Thailand and Seoul, South Korea. In the summer of 2019 they did shows in the US, and the tour visited a few countries in Europe as well. In the autumn of 2019 the tour visited the UK and Ireland. In 2022, they embarked on their Getting Better Tour, beginning on 29 May with acoustic dates in the U.K., and then fully electric dates in the U.S. beginning on 12 July. They will also play dates in Europe, Southeast Asia and Latin America.

== Members ==
- Reece Bibby, born on 13 August 1998 (age 27) – vocals, bass, drum, cajon, guitar. He was a member of the X Factor group, Stereo Kicks.
- George Smith, born on 9 March 1999 (age 27) – vocals, guitar, piano.
- Blake Richardson, born on 2 October 1999 (age 26) – lead vocals, guitar, piano.

== Discography ==
=== Studio albums ===
Title	Details	Peak chart positions			Sales
Title	Details	UK	IRE	KOR	Sales
New Hope Club	Release date: 14 February 2020; Label: Virgin/Universal Music Group; Format: Digital download, streaming	5	7	43	KOR: 1,199
Getting Better	Release date: 5 July 2024; Label: Hollywood Records; Format: Digital download, streaming	–	–	–	

=== Extended plays ===
Title	Notes
Welcome to the Club	Release date: 5 May 2017; Label: Steady/Hollywood; Format: Digital download
Welcome to the Club Pt. 2	Release date: 30 October 2018; Label: Steady/Hollywood; Format: Digital download
Summer Showers with Reece	Release date: 12 August 2021; Label: UMG; Format: Digital download
Get Ready For Tour With Blake	Release date: 26 August 2021; Label: UMG; Format: Digital download
Cooking Up Some Tunes with George	Release date: 9 September 2021; Label: UMG; Format: Digital download

=== Singles ===
Title	Year	Album
"Perfume"	2017	Welcome to the Club EP
"Make Up"	2017	Non-album single
"Fixed"	2017	Welcome to the Club EP
"Water"	2017	Welcome to the Club EP
"Fixed" (Brad Simpson Remix)	2017	Welcome to the Club EP (Asia Special Edition)
"Whoever He Is"	2017	Welcome to the Club EP (Asia Special Edition)
"Good Day"	2018	Early Man: Original Motion Picture Soundtrack
"Tiger Feet"	2018	Early Man: Original Motion Picture Soundtrack
"Start Over Again"	2018	Non-album single
"Medicine"	2018	New Hope Club
"Crazy"	2018	New Hope Club
"Karma"	2018	New Hope Club
"Let Me Down Slow - Live at the O2"	2018	New Hope Club
"Permission"	2019	New Hope Club
"Love Again"	2019	New Hope Club
"Somebody That You Loved"	2019	Non-album singles
"Paycheck"	2019	Non-album singles
"Know Me Too Well" (with Danna Paola)	2019	New Hope Club
"Let Me Down Slow" (with R3hab)	2020	New Hope Club
"Worse"	2020	Non-album single
"Getting Better"	2022	Getting Better
"Call Me A Quitter"	2022	Getting Better
"Whatever"	2022	Getting Better
"L.U.S.H."	2022	Getting Better
"Walk It Out"	2022	Getting Better
"Super Chic" (with P1Harmony)	2023	Non-album single
"Don't Go Wasting Time"	2023	Getting Better
"Just Don't Know It Yet"	2023	Getting Better
"Girl Who Does Both"	2024	Getting Better
"Can't Lose This Fight"	2024	Non-album singles
"Trouble In Paradise"	2024	Non-album singles
"Swimming with Sharks"	2024	Non-album singles
"Stars"	2024	Non-album singles

=== Music videos ===
Title	Year	Director(s)	Ref.
"Perfume"	2017	Dean Sherwood	
"Make Up"	2017	Dean Sherwood	
"Fixed"	2017	Ed Rigg	
"Water"	2017	Dean Sherwood	
"Fixed (Brad Simpson) Remix"	2017	Joshua Tanner	
"Whoever He Is (Christmas Song)"	2017	Dean Sherwood	
"Good Day"	2018	Dean Sherwood	
"Tiger Feet" (lyric video)	2018	Chris Philips	
"Tiger Feet"	2018	Dean Sherwood	
"Start Over Again"	2018	Dean Sherwood	
"Medicine"	2018	Dean Sherwood	
"Crazy"	2018		
"Permission"	2019		
"Love Again"	2019		
"Know Me Too Well"	2019		
"Let Me Down Slow"	2020		
"Let Me Down Slow (Acoustic)"	2020		
"Girl Who Does Both"	2022	Joshua Fairbrother	
"Getting Better"	2022	Roscoe	
"Getting Better" (Alternate Version)	2022		
"Call Me A Quitter"	2022	Carrick Moore Geretty	
"Whatever"	2022	Joshua Tanner	
