= Rockschool =

- Created by: Educational Broadcasting Corporation
- Starring: Herbie Hancock
- Country of origin: United Kingdom
- Original language: English
- No. of episodes: 8 (Series 1); 8 (Series 2)

Production
- Running time: 25 minutes

Original release
- Network: BBC2
- Release: 1 November 1983 – 8 December 1987

Rockschool is a television series aired by the BBC and PBS on 1 November 1983. The series explored the history of rock music and gave instruction in popular performance techniques.

Aired in the United States by public television station WNET, Herbie Hancock was brought in to host the series for the American market. Hancock presented various topics in a studio classroom setting, interspersed with short lessons from the "Rockschool Band" composed of Deirdre Cartwright on electric guitar, Geoff Nicholls on drums, and Henry Thomas on bass, and interview segments with well-known musicians.

The series was produced by the Educational Broadcasting Corporation and distributed in the U.S. by Lorimar Productions in 1987, as six volumes on VHS tape.

== Volume listing ==
- Rockschool Volume 1: Elementary Equipment and Basic Technique
- Rockschool Volume 2: Blues to Heavy Metal
- Rockschool Volume 3: Funk, Reggae & New Music
- Rockschool Volume 4: Digital Age Hardware
- Rockschool Volume 5: Melody and Soloing – The Lifeblood of Rock
- Rockschool Volume 6: Arrangements – Putting It All Together

== Companion books ==
Two volumes titled Rockschool 1: Guitar, Bass & Drums and Rockschool 2: Electronics, Keyboards & Vocals were published in the U.S. in 1987 by Fireside Books (Simon & Schuster). Volume 1 was previously published in Great Britain by the BBC in 1984. The books were edited by series producer Chris Lent.

== Credits ==
Host: Herbie Hancock (U.S. series)

The Rockschool Band

- Guitar: Deirdre Cartwright
- Bass guitar: Henry Thomas
- Drums: Geoff Nicholls
- Keyboards: Alastair Gavin (Series 2)

Produced and directed by: Chris Lent

Guest demonstrators

- Tony Banks
- Graham Bonnet
- Bill Bruford
- Vince Clarke
- The Communards
- John Entwistle
- Omar Hakim
- Jan Hammer
- Allan Holdsworth
- James Ingram
- Danny Johnson
- Gary Moore
- Carl Palmer
- Ian Paice
- Midge Ure
- Dennis Bovell
- Wilko Johnson
- Robbie Shakespeare
- Andy Taylor

Performances

- Bronski Beat
- Depeche Mode
- Thomas Dolby
- Japan
- Freddie King
- Annie Lennox
- The Mahavishnu Orchestra
- The Pointer Sisters
- Motörhead
- Jimi Hendrix
- Bootsy Collins
- The Smiths
- U2
- Rick Wakeman
