= Somebody to You (EP) =

- Cover of the digital EP release on iTunes

EP by The Vamps
- Released: 4 August 2014
- Genre: Pop
- Label: Virgin EMI
- Producer: TMS; Espionage

The Vamps chronology
| Meet the Vamps (2014) | Somebody to You (2014) | Wake Up (2015) |

Singles from Somebody to You
- 1. "Somebody to You" Released: 18 May 2014

Somebody to You is the debut extended play (EP) by British pop band The Vamps. It was released on 4 August 2014 for promotion in the United States after their success internationally in two formats with slightly destined for the American market with the title song "Somebody to You" featuring Demi Lovato to be their debut single in the States.

== Background ==
The physical release contains six tracks whereas the digital release contains five tracks. Three of the tracks are common to both releases: "Somebody to You", "Wild Heart" and a cover of One Direction's "Midnight Memories". Furthermore, the physical release has three more tracks not found on the digital release, namely "High Hopes", "Sweater Weather" and "She Was the One", whereas the digital release on iTunes contains two unique tracks not found on the physical release, namely "Move My Way" and a cover of 5 Seconds of Summer's "She Looks So Perfect". The album has received critical acclaim since its release. The Vamps also offered the physical EP with a deluxe bundle that included a pack of four wristbands and an exclusive poster through their official website.

== Chart performance ==
In the United States, the EP charted on the Billboard 200 albums chart, separately from the single, which peaked on the Bubbling Under Hot 100 Singles chart. The EP debuted at number 10 on the Billboard 200, but then fell to number 192 in its second week.

== Track listing ==
US EP
| No. | Title | Length |
|---|---|---|
| 1. | "Somebody to You" (featuring Demi Lovato) | 3:03 |
| 2. | "Wild Heart" | 3:11 |
| 3. | "Midnight Memories" | 3:47 |
| 4. | "High Hopes" | 3:30 |
| 5. | "Sweater Weather" | 3:16 |
| 6. | "She Was the One" |

US digital EP
| No. | Title | Length |
|---|---|---|
| 1. | "Somebody to You" (featuring Demi Lovato) | 3:03 |
| 2. | "Wild Heart" | 3:11 |
| 3. | "Midnight Memories" | 3:47 |
| 4. | "Move My Way" | 3:28 |
| 5. | "She Looks So Perfect" | 3:39 |

== Charts ==
| Chart (2014) | Peak position |
|---|---|
| US Billboard 200 | 10 |

== Release history ==
| Region | Date | Format(s) | Label |
|---|---|---|---|
| United States | 4 August 2014 | CD, digital download | Virgin EMI |
