= Meet the Vamps =

Debut studio album by British band The Vamps

Studio album by the Vamps
- Released: 11 April 2014
- Recorded: 2012–2013
- Genre: Pop; pop rock; folk pop
- Length: 51:00
- Label: Virgin EMI
- Producer: TMS; Espionage

The Vamps chronology
Meet the Vamps (2014)	Somebody to You (2014)

The Vamps studio album chronology
Meet the Vamps (2014)	Wake Up (2015)

Alternative cover
- Deluxe edition cover

Singles from Meet the Vamps
- 1. "Can We Dance" Released: 6 August 2013; 2. "Wild Heart" Released: 19 January 2014; 3. "Last Night" Released: 6 April 2014; 4. "Somebody to You" Released: 18 May 2014; 5. "Oh Cecilia (Breaking My Heart)" Released: 12 October 2014

Meet the Vamps is the debut studio album by British pop band the Vamps. It was initially released in Australia and New Zealand on 11 April 2014, and released in the United Kingdom through Virgin EMI Records on 14 April. The album includes the UK top-five singles "Can We Dance", "Wild Heart", "Last Night" and "Somebody to You". The album received generally positive reviews from music critics. It debuted at number two in the United Kingdom and Ireland. It was the 23rd-best-selling album in 2014 in the UK.

== Background and promotion ==
After James McVey met Brad Simpson via YouTube in late 2011, the duo began working together on their debut album. They later met Tristan Evans and Connor Ball and became a four-piece. They signed a record deal with Mercury Records in November 2012. On 22 March 2014, The Vamps announced that their debut album would be called Meet the Vamps and would be released on 15 April 2014.

The Vamps embarked on their first ever UK headline tour in support of their debut studio album and played 14 dates across the country. They made the announcement via their Twitter account on 12 February 2014.

== Singles ==
- "Can We Dance" was released on 29 September 2013 as the Vamps' debut single and the lead single from the album. It had previously been on course to debut at number one on the UK Singles Chart, it eventually entered at number two, being beaten to the top spot by OneRepublic's "Counting Stars". The song has also peaked to number 17 in Australia and number 19 in New Zealand.
- "Wild Heart" was released as the album's second single on 19 January 2014. The song peaked to number 3 in the UK.
- "Last Night" was released as the third single on 6 April 2014, and peaked at number 2 on the UK Singles Chart.
- A new version of "Somebody to You" which features Demi Lovato was released as the fourth UK single and the Vamps' debut single in the US on 18 May 2014, and peaked at number four on the UK Singles Chart.
- A new version of "Oh Cecilia (Breaking My Heart)" which features Shawn Mendes was released as the fifth single from the album on 12 October 2014. The song peaked at number 9 on the UK Singles Chart. It is certified Silver in the UK.

=== Promotional singles ===
- "Dangerous" was released as a promotional single on 14 April 2014.

== Reception ==
=== Critical reception ===
Professional ratings
Review scores
Source	Rating
AllMusic	3/5 stars
Digital Spy	3/5 stars
The Guardian	3/5 stars
Virgin Media	3/5 stars

The album received generally positive reviews from music critics. AllMusic critic Matt Collar noted that the album "showcases the group's high-energy mix of melodic pop and dance music." Lewis Corner of Digital Spy gave the album a positive review, stating, "...Meet packs a big enough pop punch to pierce through the oversaturated landscape and get itself noticed. They may have a lot of competition out there, but The Vamps have proven that they are more than capable to take on the challenge." Caroline Sullivan of The Guardian also gave the album a positive review. She said, "segments of Meet the Vamps are verifiably bandy", but also felt that "there are many moments when it would be hard to pick the Vamps out of a lineup alongside One Direction and Peter Andre (whose "Mysterious Girl" clearly provided much of the inspiration for "Girls on TV"). This is where their origins as a YouTube covers act are most evident, and the need for a voice of their own most felt." Virgin Media's Matthew Horton called the album "an appealing effort that adds something to the pop landscape".

=== Commercial performance ===
Meet the Vamps debuted at number two on the Irish Albums Chart, behind Paolo Nutini's Caustic Love. The same album kept it off the number one spot on the UK Albums Chart. It sold 47,160 in its first week, and was the 23rd biggest selling album of 2014. It has been certified Platinum by the British Phonographic Industry (BPI) for sales of over 300,000 copies.

In Australia, the album debuted at number three on the ARIA Charts, behind the Frozen soundtrack and The New Classic by Iggy Azalea. In the United States, the album debuted at No. 40 on the Billboard 200 albums chart on its first week of release, with around 10,000 copies sold. As of October 2015, the album has sold 51,000 copies in the US.

== Track listing ==
No.	Title	Writer(s)	Producer(s)	Length
1.	"Wild Heart"	Connor Ball; Tristan Evans; James McVey; Brad Simpson; Ibrahim "Ayb" Asmar; Amund Björklund; Ben Harrison; Espen Lind; Jamie Scott	Espionage; Asmar^{[a]}; Harrison^{[a]}	3:11
2.	"Last Night"	Tom Barnes; Wayne Hector; Pete Kelleher; Ben Kohn; Ayak Thiik	TMS	3:07
3.	"Somebody to You"	Carl Falk; Nate Blasdell; Savan Kotecha; Kristian Lundin	Falk; Lundin	3:03
4.	"Can We Dance" (single version)	Timz Aluo; Amund Björklund; Philip Lawrence; Espen Lind; Bruno Mars; Karl Michael	Espionage	3:12
5.	"Girls on TV"	Ball; Evans; McVey; Simpson; Seye Adelekan; Matt Prime; Tim Woodcock	Prime; Jay Reynolds	3:23
6.	"Risk It All"	Ball; Evans; McVey; Simpson; Hector; Prime	Prime	3:38
7.	"Oh Cecilia (Breaking My Heart)"	Paul Simon; Ball; Evans; McVey; Simpson; Michaud	Espionage; Andrew Williams^{[b]}	3:16
8.	"Another World"	Ball; Evans; McVey; Simpson; Paul Barry; Mark Bates; Patrick Mascall	Brian Rawling; Paul Meehan; Bates	3:34
9.	"Move My Way"	McVey	Reynolds	3:28
10.	"Shout About It"	Ball; Evans; McVey; Simpson; Prime	Prime	3:41
11.	"High Hopes"	Ball; Evans; McVey; Simpson; Tom Fletcher; Danny Jones; Dougie Poynter	Jones	3:30
12.	"She Was the One"	Ball; Evans; McVey; Simpson	David Bendeth; Evans^{[b]}	3:20
13.	"Dangerous"	Ball; Evans; McVey; Simpson; Jay Reynolds	Reynolds; Evans	3:55
14.	"Lovestruck"	Ball; Evans; McVey; Simpson; C.J. Baran; Lindy Robbins	Baran	3:41
15.	"Smile"	Ball; Evans; McVey; Simpson	Reynolds	3:01
Total length:				51:00

Meet the Vamps – Digital deluxe edition bonus tracks
No.	Title	Writer(s)	Producer(s)	Length
16.	"On the Floor"	Björklund; Lind; Ball; Evans; McVey; Simpson; James Bourne	Espionage	3:28
17.	"Golden"	Ball; Evans; McVey; Simpson; Alex Smith	Smith	3:19
18.	"Fall"	Ball; Evans; McVey; Simpson; David Sneddon; James Bauer-Mein	Reynolds	3:03
Total length:				60:50

Meet the Vamps – Japanese edition bonus tracks
No.	Title	Length
19.	"Story of My Life"	4:00
20.	"22"	3:02
21.	"What About Love"	3:24
22.	"Twist & Shout"	2:39

Meet the Vamps – DVD edition
No.	Title	Length
1.	"Story of the Vamps"	75:00

=== Christmas Edition ===
Meet the Vamps: Christmas Edition was released on 1 December 2014. It includes eight Christmas songs, the original version of "Somebody to You" and a DVD of band performing live at Birmingham NIA on 5 October 2014.

No.	Title	Writer(s)	Producer(s)	Length
1.	"Jingle Bell Rock"	Joe Beal; Jim Boothe		2:15
2.	"Sleighing in the Snow"	Brad Simpson, James McVey, Connor Ball, Tristan Evans		2:42
3.	"Hoping for Snow"	James McVey, Brad Simpson, Connor Ball, Tristan Evans, Joe O'Neill		3:39
4.	"We Wish You a Merry Christmas"	Traditional		2:02
5.	"I Wish It Could Be Christmas Everyday"	Roy Wood		3:06
6.	"Hallelujah"	Leonard Cohen		3:45
7.	"Jingle Bells"	James Lord Pierpont		3:01
8.	"Silent Night"	Joseph Mohr		2:06
9.	"Wild Heart"	Ball; Evans; McVey; Simpson; Asmar; Björklund; Harrison; Lind; Scott	Espionage; Asmar^{[a]}; Harrison^{[a]}	3:11
10.	"Last Night"	Barnes; Hector; Kelleher; Kohn; Thiik	TMS	3:07
11.	"Somebody to You" (featuring Demi Lovato)	Falk; Kotecha; Lundin	Falk; Lundin	3:03
12.	"Can We Dance"	Aluo; Björklund; Lawrence; Lind; Mars; Michael	Espionage	3:37
13.	"Girls on TV"	Ball; Evans; McVey; Simpson; Adelekan; Prime; Woodcock	Prime; Reynolds	3:23
14.	"Risk It All"	Ball; Evans; McVey; Simpson; Hector; Prime	Prime	3:38
15.	"Oh Cecilia (Breaking My Heart)" (featuring Shawn Mendes)	Simon; Ball; Evans; McVey; Simpson	Espionage; Williams^{[b]}	3:16
16.	"Another World"	Ball; Evans; McVey; Simpson; Barry; Bates; Mascall	Rawling; Meehan; Bates	3:34
17.	"Move My Way"	McVey	Reynolds	3:28
18.	"Shout About It"	Ball; Evans; McVey; Simpson; Prime	Prime	3:41
19.	"High Hopes"	Ball; Evans; McVey; Simpson; Fletcher; Jones; Poynter	Jones	3:30
20.	"She Was the One"	Ball; Evans; McVey; Simpson	Bendeth; Evans^{[b]}	3:20
21.	"Dangerous"	Ball; Evans; McVey; Simpson; Reynolds	Reynolds; Evans	3:55
22.	"Lovestruck"	Ball; Evans; McVey; Simpson; Baran; Robbins	Baran	3:41
23.	"Smile"	Ball; Evans; McVey; Simpson	Reynolds	3:01
24.	"Somebody to You"	Falk; Kotecha; Lundin	Falk; Lundin	3:03
Total length:				77:04

Physical DVD: Meet the Vamps Live
No.	Title	Length
1.	"Meet the Vamps Live"

=== US version ===
Meet the Vamps – Standard edition
No.	Title	Writer(s)	Producer(s)	Length
1.	"Can We Dance" (single version)	Aluo; Björklund; Lawrence; Lind; Mars; Michael	Espionage	3:12
2.	"Somebody to You" (featuring Demi Lovato)	Falk; Kotecha; Lundin	Falk; Lundin	3:03
3.	"Last Night"	Barnes; Hector; Kelleher; Kohn; Thiik	TMS	3:07
4.	"Oh Cecilia (Breaking My Heart)" (featuring Shawn Mendes)	Simon; Ball; Evans; McVey; Simpson	Espionage; Williams^{[b]}	3:16
5.	"Girls on TV"	Ball; Evans; McVey; Simpson; Adelekan; Prime; Woodcock	Prime; Reynolds	3:23
6.	"Risk It All"	Ball; Evans; McVey; Simpson; Hector; Prime	Prime	3:38
7.	"Hurricane"	Simpson; McVey; Ball; Evans		3:15
8.	"Wild Heart"	Ball; Evans; McVey; Simpson; Asmar; Björklund; Harrison; Lind; Scott	Espionage; Asmar^{[a]}; Harrison^{[a]}	3:11
9.	"Another World"	Ball; Evans; McVey; Simpson; Barry; Bates; Mascall	Rawling; Meehan; Bates	3:34
10.	"Move My Way"	McVey	Reynolds	3:28
11.	"She Was the One"	Ball; Evans; McVey; Simpson	Bendeth; Evans^{[b]}	3:20
12.	"Smile"	Ball; Evans; McVey; Simpson	Reynolds	3:01
Total length:				39:28

Meet the Vamps – iTunes Store deluxe edition bonus tracks
No.	Title	Writer(s)	Producer(s)	Length
13.	"High Hopes"	Ball; Evans; McVey; Simpson; Fletcher; Jones; Poynter	Jones	3:30
14.	"Shout About It"	Ball; Evans; McVey; Simpson; Prime	Prime	3:41
15.	"Dangerous"	Ball; Evans; McVey; Simpson; Reynolds	Reynolds; Evans	3:55
Total length:				50:34

Meet the Vamps – Target deluxe edition bonus tracks
No.	Title	Writer(s)	Length
13.	"Jingle Bells"	Pierpont	3:01
14.	"Hoping for Snow"	McVey; Simpson; Ball; Evans; O'Neill	3:39
15.	"We Wish You a Merry Christmas"		2:02
Total length:			48:10

Meet the Vamps – Digital fan edition
No.	Title	Writer(s)	Producer(s)	Length
1.	"Can We Dance" (single version)	Aluo; Björklund; Lawrence; Lind; Mars; Michael	Espionage	3:12
2.	"Somebody to You" (featuring Demi Lovato)	Falk; Kotecha; Lundin	Falk; Lundin	3:03
3.	"Last Night" (Gospel mix)	Barnes; Hector; Kelleher; Kohn; Thiik	TMS	2:54
4.	"Oh Cecilia (Breaking My Heart)" (featuring Shawn Mendes)	Simon; Ball; Evans; McVey; Simpson	Espionage; Williams^{[b]}	3:16
5.	"Girls on TV"	Ball; Evans; McVey; Simpson; Adelekan; Prime; Woodcock	Prime; Reynolds	3:23
6.	"Risk It All"	Ball; Evans; McVey; Simpson; Hector; Prime	Prime	3:38
7.	"Teenagers" (live from The Vamps Tour)	Frank Iero; Mikey Way; Gerard Way; Ray Toro; Bob Bryar		3:15
8.	"Hurricane"	Simpson; McVey; Ball; Evans		3:19
9.	"Wild Heart" (Nashville mix)	Ball; Evans; McVey; Simpson; Asmar; Björklund; Harrison; Lind; Scott	Espionage; Asmar^{[a]}; Harrison^{[a]}	3:11
10.	"Another World"	Ball; Evans; McVey; Simpson; Barry; Bates; Mascall	Rawling; Meehan; Bates	3:34
11.	"Move My Way"	McVey	Reynolds	3:28
12.	"She Was the One" (live from The Vamps Tour)	Ball; Evans; McVey; Simpson	Bendeth; Evans^{[b]}	4:12
13.	"Smile"	Ball; Evans; McVey; Simpson	Reynolds	3:01
14.	"Somebody to You" (acoustic version)	Falk; Kotecha; Lundin	Falk; Lundin	3:02
15.	"Oh Cecilia (Breaking My Heart)" (live from The Vamps Tour)	Simon; Ball; Evans; McVey; Simpson	Espionage; Williams^{[b]}	5:36
16.	"Last Night" (live from The Vamps Tour)	Barnes; Hector; Kelleher; Kohn; Thiik	TMS	4:39

== Charts ==
=== Weekly charts ===
Chart (2014)	Peak position
Australian Albums (ARIA)	3
Belgian Albums (Ultratop Flanders)	24
Belgian Albums (Ultratop Wallonia)	35
China Albums (Sino Chart)	12
Czech Albums (ČNS IFPI)	59
Danish Albums (Hitlisten)	20
Dutch Albums (Album Top 100)	35
French Albums (SNEP)	29
Irish Albums (IRMA)	2
Italian Albums (FIMI)	9
Japanese Albums (Oricon)	24
New Zealand Albums (RMNZ)	8
Norwegian Albums (VG-lista)	17
Polish Albums (ZPAV)	21
Portuguese Albums (AFP)	13
Scottish Albums (OCC)	2
Spanish Albums (PROMUSICAE)	7
Swiss Albums (Schweizer Hitparade)	10
UK Albums (OCC)	2
UK Album Downloads (OCC)	3
US Billboard 200	40
US Indie Store Album Sales (Billboard)	24

=== Year-end charts ===
Chart (2014)	Position
UK Albums (OCC)	23

== Certifications ==
Region	Certification	Certified units/sales
Denmark (IFPI Danmark)	Gold	10,000^{‡}
New Zealand (RMNZ)	Platinum	15,000^{‡}
Singapore (RIAS)	Gold	5,000^{*}
United Kingdom (BPI)	Platinum	301,054
^{*} Sales figures based on certification alone.^{‡} Sales+streaming figures based on certification alone.

== Release history ==
Region	Date	Format	Version	Label
Australia	11 April 2014	CD; digital download	Standard; Deluxe	Virgin EMI
Ireland	11 April 2014	CD; digital download; DVD	Standard; Deluxe	Virgin EMI
New Zealand	11 April 2014	CD; digital download	Standard; Deluxe	Virgin EMI
United Kingdom	15 April 2014	CD; digital download; DVD	Standard; Deluxe	Virgin EMI
Japan	21 May 2014	CD; digital download; DVD	Standard; Deluxe	Virgin EMI
Canada	4 November 2014	CD; digital download	Standard; Deluxe	Virgin EMI
United States	4 November 2014	CD; digital download	Standard; Deluxe	Virgin EMI
Ireland	28 November 2014	CD; digital download	Christmas Edition	Virgin EMI
Canada	1 December 2014	CD; digital download	Christmas Edition	Virgin EMI
United Kingdom	1 December 2014	CD; digital download	Christmas Edition	Virgin EMI
Japan	1 December 2014	digital download	Christmas Edition	Virgin EMI
Japan	28 Jan 2015	CD with DVD	Japan Tour Edition	Mercury

== Meet the Vamps (ReVamped) ==
Meet the Vamps (ReVamped)

EP by The Vamps
- Released: 20 September 2024
- Length: 22:41
- Producer: The Vamps

The Vamps chronology
10 Years of The Vamps – Chosen by You (2022)	Meet the Vamps (ReVamped) (2024)

Meet the Vamps (ReVamped) is an EP by British pop band the Vamps, released independently on 20 September 2024. It was preceded by three promotional singles, namely "Somebody to You (ReVamped)", "Last Night (ReVamped)", and "Oh Cecilia (Breaking My Heart) (ReVamped)". It features stripped-down re-recordings of six Meet the Vamps tracks.

=== Track listing ===
Meet the Vamps (ReVamped)
No.	Title	Writer(s)	Length
1.	"Wild Heart"	Ball; Evans; McVey; Simpson; Asmar; Björklund; Harrison; Lind; Scott	3:28
2.	"Last Night"	Barnes; Hector; Kelleher; Kohn; Thiik	3:14
3.	"Somebody to You"	Falk; Kotecha; Lundin	4:04
4.	"Can We Dance"	Aluo; Björklund; Lawrence; Lind; Mars; Michael	3:45
5.	"Risk It All"	Ball; Evans; McVey; Simpson; Hector; Prime	3:45
6.	"Oh Cecilia (Breaking My Heart)"	Simon; Ball; Evans; McVey; Simpson	4:25
Total length:			22:41

Notes

- All tracks are produced by The Vamps, and subtitled "ReVamped".
