= Astral Rejection =

Studio album by I Set My Friends on Fire
- Released: June 21, 2011
- Genre: Post-hardcore; mathcore; experimental rock; electronicore
- Length: 35:01
- Label: Epitaph
- Producer: Travis Richter

I Set My Friends on Fire chronology
You Can't Spell Slaughter Without Laughter (2008)	Astral Rejection (2011)	Online Now! (2019)

Singles from Astral Rejection
- 1. "Excite Dyke" Released: June 15, 2010; 2. "It Comes Naturally" Released: March 21, 2011; 3. "Life Hertz" Released: May 24, 2011; 4. "Astral Rejection" Released: June 13, 2011

Astral Rejection is the second album by the electronic post-hardcore/experimental band I Set My Friends on Fire. The album's original release date was June 22, 2010, but due to line-up changes and the original recordings being scrapped, it was pushed back by almost a year to June 21, 2011.

== Release ==
The first single to be released from the album was a demo called "Excite Dyke", which was released on June 15, 2010. The second single, "It Comes Naturally" was released on March 21, 2011. On June 24, 2011, the third single, "Life Hertz" was released on PureVolume. On June 13, 2011, a music video for their fourth single called "Astral Rejection" was released on YouTube.

On June 16, 2011, the band began streaming the entire album on their Facebook page. The album was released in stores on June 21, 2011. The song "Fast to the End" by Thursday was included as a bonus track on some release versions of Astral Rejection. The song is given the title "Test" on the album.

== Original version ==
The original intended version of Astral Rejection was developed with Nabil Moo on all instruments and was planned to see a release in June 2010, which went rejected by Epitaph Records. In early 2017, early pre-production demos were posted to the bands VK account. These songs include early versions of the songs "Excite Dyke", "Astral Rejection", "Narcissismfof", and "Infinite Suck"; the later half differ tremendously from the final album versions. The demos are noticeably absent of Auto-Tune, which was abundant on the final mix.

In an interview with DEAD PRESS! whilst touring the UK in 2018, the label's decision to scrap the original version of the record caused tension between the two members and a large amount of stress on Nabil Moo forcing him to leave the band. Matt Mehana was then forced to handle the writing duties solo, later recruiting Chris Lent of From First To Last into the line-up. Mehana would later go on to state that the reason for the original version not seeing a release was due to ISMFOF presenting the record wholly to Epitaph rather than presenting song by song to the label and gradually working into a sound the label would prefer. The original release contains a remarkable absence of electronic elements to Epitaph's dismay.

Eventually the shelved original version of Astral Rejection did see an official release on March 29, 2019, through Epitaph.

== Reception ==
Astral Rejection ratings
Review scores
Source	Rating
AllMusic	3/5 stars
Alternative Press	1/5 stars

Astral Rejection met with mixed-to-negative reviews. Critic Phil Freeman of the Alternative Press gave the album 1 star out of 5, stating, "The music is as annoying as ever, mixing the worst qualities of Brokencyde, I See Stars and Agoraphobic Nosebleed into one swirling blend of cheesy rave synths, ultra-affected 'extreme' vocals, talentless guitar mangling, ultra-primitive drum programming and song titles that probably seemed funny at the time ("My Paralyzed Brother Taps His Foot to This Beat", "Life Hertz", "Erectangles"). It's hard to decide which is the album's worst quality—Mehana's scratchy-throated "extreme" vocals or his lame, off-key attempts to sing cleanly."

Critic Rob Sleigh of Stereoboard.com was more positive, giving the album a 6 out of 10 rating, stating, "I Set My Friends on Fire may remind of fellow Floridian metalcore band A Day to Remember, although the synth-pop technique that they frequently employ occasionally reeks with the scent of Owl City... The combination of pop music and hardcore was always a bit of a hard sell to begin with, but I Set My Friends on Fire seem to have taken this to the next level."

Despite negative critical reception, Astral Rejection peaked at #9 on the Billboard Top Heatseekers Chart.

== Track listing ==
All tracks are written by Matt Mehana, Chris Lent, Nabil Moo, Travis Richter, and Andrew Tapley, except where noted.

No.	Title	Length
1.	"It Comes Naturally"	3:37
2.	"Infinite Suck"	3:45
3.	"Excite Dyke"	3:04
4.	"My Paralyzed Brother Taps His Foot to This Beat"	2:37
5.	"Astral Rejection"	4:07
6.	"Developer, the Horn"	3:45
7.	"Narcissismfof"	2:06
8.	"Kief Catcher"	3:09
9.	"Erectangles"	2:14
10.	"Life Hertz"	3:05
11.	"CACAFUEGO, Nuestra Señora de la Concepción!"	3:37
Total length:		35:01

Pre-Order only
No.	Title	Writer(s)	Length
12.	"TEST" ("Fast to the End" by Thursday)	Geoff Rickly, Tom Keeley, Steve Pedulla, Tim Payne, Andrew Everding, Tucker Rule	3:22

Deluxe edition
No.	Title	Length
12.	"Excite Dyke" (Instrumental score)	3:04
13.	"My Paralyzed Brother Taps His Foot to This Beat" (Instrumental score)	2:37
14.	"Astral Rejection" (Instrumental score)	4:07
15.	"Life Hertz" (Instrumental score)	3:05

Original Version
No.	Title	Length
1.	"Phantasmagoria"	0:48
2.	"Excite Dyke"	3:10
3.	"Narcissismfof" (Lyrics later reworked into "Life Hertz", "Kief Catcher", and "My Paralyzed Brother Taps His Foot to This Beat")	4:05
4.	"Party at the Moon Tower" (Lyrics later reworked into "It Comes Naturally" and "CACAFUEGO, Nuestra Señora de la Concepción!")	3:33
5.	"Cantaloupe the Antelope" (Lyrics later reworked into "Developer, The Horn" and "My Paralyzed Brother Taps His Foot to This Beat")	4:09
6.	"Astral Rejection"	3:58
7.	"Infinite Suck"	3:38
8.	"Rebornphin"	3:26
9.	"Commit to the Hypothetical"	1:20
10.	"The Zenith Anniversary Stab" (Guitar riffs later reworked into "It Comes Naturally" and lyrics later reworked into "It Comes Naturally" and "Narcissismfof")	5:14

== Personnel ==
- Astral Rejection album personnel as listed on Allmusic.

=== I Set My Friends on Fire ===
- Matt Mehana - vocals, lyrics, programming, composer
- Chris Lent - drums, programming, percussion, keyboards, synthesizers, guitars, composer

=== Additional musicians ===
- Andrew Tapley - guitars, bass, composer
- Nabil Moo - composer
- Travis Richter - composer
- Matt Manning - bass (OG version)
- Thursday - hidden track labeled "Test"

=== Production ===
- Travis Richter - producer, engineer
- Lee Dyess - engineer
- Bryan Gonzalez - assistant engineer
- Sonny Kay - artwork, layout
- Blair Dickerson - logo
