= Somebody to You =

2014 song by The Vamps featuring Demi Lovato

Single by The Vamps featuring Demi Lovato

from the album Meet the Vamps and the EP Somebody to You
- Released: 18 May 2014
- Studio: Chalice Studios (Los Angeles, CA); Conway Recording Studios (Los Angeles, CA); Kinglet Studios (Stockholm, Sweden)
- Genre: Pop rock
- Length: 3:03
- Label: Mercury; Virgin EMI
- Songwriters: Carl Falk; Nate Blasdell; Savan Kotecha; Kristian Lundin
- Producers: Carl Falk; Kristian Lundin

The Vamps singles chronology
| "Last Night" (2014) | "Somebody to You" (2014) | "Oh Cecilia (Breaking My Heart)" (2014) |

Demi Lovato singles chronology
| "Neon Lights" (2013) | "Somebody to You" (2014) | "Really Don't Care" (2014) |

Music video
- "Somebody to You" on YouTube

"Somebody to You" is a song by British pop rock band The Vamps. A version featuring American singer Demi Lovato was released in the United Kingdom on 18 May 2014 as the fourth single from their debut studio album, Meet the Vamps (2014). The song peaked at number 4 on the UK Singles Chart, becoming the group's fourth successive top 5 single in the United Kingdom. It also peaked at number 10 in The Republic of Ireland and South Africa, as well as number 14 in Australia, their highest-charting single to date in the country.

The song was released as the band's first official single in the United States, alongside their debut extended play (EP) Somebody to You, released on 4 August 2014, but failed to chart on the Billboard Hot 100. However, the EP charted at number 10 on the Billboard 200.

== Composition ==
Sheet music for the song "Somebody to You" shows the key of E-flat major and a tempo of 88.

== Music video ==
The official music video was uploaded on YouTube on 9 June 2014. The video was directed by Emil Nava and shot in Malibu, California. The video is about a young girl (played by Laura Marano) who spends time with her friends in the summer until they are joined by The Vamps, and their group's lead singer (Bradley Simpson) falls in love with the girl. Demi Lovato appears as the guest vocals in the video.

== Live performances ==
The Vamps and Lovato first performed the song live on The Ellen DeGeneres Show, on 10 November 2014.

== Track listings ==
- Digital download
1. "Somebody to You" (Single version) (featuring Demi Lovato) – 3:03
- Digital download – Acoustic version
1. "Somebody to You" (Acoustic version) (featuring Demi Lovato) – 3:01
- Digital download – EP
1. "Somebody to You" (Durrant & More Club Mix) (featuring Demi Lovato) – 4:45
1. "Can We Dance" (Live from the O2) – 3:44
2. "Sweater Weather" – 3:16
- CD1
1. "Somebody to You" – 3:03
2. "Midnight Memories"
3. "That Girl"
4. "On the Floor"
- CD2
1. "Somebody to You" (James & Connor version)
2. "Rough Night" (demo)
- DVD
1. "Somebody to You" (music video) – 3:03
2. "Carry on Vamping: A Day on Tour" (documentary)

== Charts ==
=== Weekly charts ===
| Chart (2014) | Peak position |
|---|---|
| Australia (ARIA) | 14 |
| Belgium (Ultratip Bubbling Under Flanders) | 84 |
| Canada Hot 100 (Billboard) | 68 |
| CIS Airplay (TopHit) | 183 |
| Euro Digital Songs (Billboard) | 14 |
| France (SNEP) | 153 |
| Ireland (IRMA) | 10 |
| New Zealand (Recorded Music NZ) | 17 |
| Scotland Singles (OCC) | 1 |
| South Africa (EMA) | 10 |
| UK Singles (OCC) | 4 |
| US Bubbling Under Hot 100 (Billboard) | 10 |

=== Year-end charts ===
| Chart (2014) | Position |
|---|---|
| Australia (ARIA) | 97 |
| UK Singles (Official Charts Company) | 95 |

== Certifications ==
| Region | Certification | Certified units/sales |
|---|---|---|
| Australia (ARIA) | Platinum | 70,000^{^} |
| Brazil (Pro-Música Brasil) | Platinum | 60,000^{‡} |
| Canada (Music Canada) | Gold | 40,000^{*} |
| Denmark (IFPI Danmark) | Gold | 45,000^{‡} |
| New Zealand (RMNZ) | 2× Platinum | 60,000^{‡} |
| United Kingdom (BPI) | Platinum | 600,000^{‡} |
| United States (RIAA) | Gold | 278,000 |
^{*} Sales figures based on certification alone.^{^} Shipments figures based on certification alone.^{‡} Sales+streaming figures based on certification alone.

== Release history ==
Release dates and formats for "Somebody to You"
| Region | Date | Format | Label(s) | Ref. |
|---|---|---|---|---|
| United States | 19 August 2014 | Mainstream airplay | Island; Republic | |
