= The Vamps (British band) =

British band

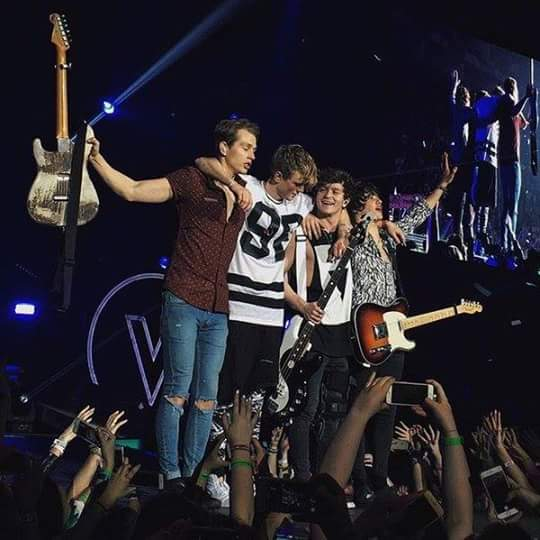
- The Vamps performing at the O2 Arena in London during their Wake Up World Tour, in April 2016. (L-R: James Brittain-McVey, Tristan Evans, Connor Ball and Brad Simpson)

Background information
- Origin: England
- Genres: Pop; pop rock
- Years active: 2012–present
- Labels: Mercury; Virgin EMI; Island
- Members: Bradley Simpson; James Brittain-McVey; Connor Ball; Tristan Evans
- Website: thevamps.net

The Vamps are a British pop band consisting of Bradley Simpson, James Brittain-McVey, Connor Ball and Tristan Evans. They formed in 2012 and signed to Mercury Records (now Virgin EMI Records) in the November of the same year.

In 2017, they had their first number 1 on the UK Albums Chart with Night & Day (Night Edition). Their first two albums, Meet The Vamps and Wake Up are both certified Gold in the UK. The Vamps have also launched their own record label, Steady Records, and they are working in partnership with EMI/Universal. The first act signed was American band The Tide.

In 2018, guitarist McVey participated in the eighteenth series of I'm a Celebrity...Get Me Out of Here! and finished in fifth place. They have continuously toured worldwide since their debut in 2012, and they are the first band to headline London's O2 Arena five years in a row.

== History ==
=== 2011–2012: Formation ===
James McVey was already managed by Richard Rashman and Joe O'Neill of Prestige Management. Deciding he wanted to form a band, McVey subsequently discovered Bradley Simpson in 2011 through YouTube. Together, the pair wrote songs towards the later months of 2011, with Simpson later becoming the lead singer. In 2012, Simpson and McVey met Tristan Evans through Facebook. The trio then met Connor Ball via a mutual friend. In mid-2012, the band started uploading cover songs to their YouTube channel. By October, they were being described as a new boy band, with special attention given to their YouTube performance of One Direction's song "Live While We're Young".

=== 2013–2014: Meet the Vamps ===
On 22 July 2013, the band uploaded their first original song, "Wildheart" (later re-titled "Wild Heart"), onto their YouTube account; the video received over 46,000 views within the first two days. On 6 August 2013, they released the music video for their debut single "Can We Dance", which received over 1 million views within two weeks. "Can We Dance" was released on 29 September 2013 and debuted at number two on the UK Singles Chart on 6 October 2013; beaten to number one by OneRepublic's "Counting Stars", which sold 1,250 copies more. On 19 November 2013, the band announced that they would release their debut album around Easter. On 22 November 2013, the Vamps announced that their second single would be "Wild Heart". The song received its first airplay three days later and was released on 19 January 2014, peaking at number three on the UK Singles Chart the following week.

On 13 March 2014, the Vamps announced that their debut album would be released on 14 April 2014. On 22 March, it was revealed that the album would be titled Meet the Vamps. On 6 April, they released "Last Night" as the third single from the album, debuting at number two in the UK. On 17 April, Meet the Vamps debuted at number two on the Irish Albums Chart and the UK Albums Chart, kept off the top spot by Paolo Nutini's Caustic Love.

In May 2014, it was announced that the Vamps would be making a cameo appearance in the soap opera Hollyoaks on 14 May 2014. Hollyoaks released a teaser clip about the Vamps' appearance on YouTube. They were seen getting a picture with Peri Lomax (Ruby O'Donnell) as she goes to their concert with Sienna Blake (Anna Passey).

On 18 May 2014, a new version of "Somebody to You", featuring American singer Demi Lovato, was released as the fourth single from Meet the Vamps as well as their debut single in the United States followed by an EP of the same title in August 2014. The collaboration also served as the lead single from the US version of the Vamps' debut album. Its accompanying music video has since accumulated over 108 million views on YouTube.

On 12 October 2014, a new version of "Oh Cecilia (Breaking My Heart)", featuring Canadian singer Shawn Mendes, was released as the fifth and last single from their album. It debuted and peaked at number nine on the UK Singles Chart, becoming their fifth consecutive top 10 single. It was released with the b-side track "Hurricane", from Alexander and the Terrible, Horrible, No Good, Very Bad Day soundtrack. The music videos for both tracks were released one month earlier.

On 4 November 2014, Meet the Vamps was officially released in North America. On 1 December 2014, the album was re-released as Meet the Vamps (Christmas Edition), including eight Christmas bonus tracks and the single version of "Somebody to You", being available worldwide apart from the United States and Mexico.

=== 2015–2016: Steady Records and Wake Up ===
In February 2015, The Vamps announced that they had launched their own record label along with Universal Music and EMI Records, having signed the American pop rock band The Tide as their first act, but the label didn't have a name yet. Only in October it was revealed it would be called Steady Records.

On 15 September 2015, the band announced their new single "Wake Up" which was released on 2 October 2015. Their second studio album, "Wake Up", was released on 27 November 2015. They performed at fanfests in Europe and embarked on a world tour called Wake Up World Tour which started in January 2016 to promote the album. The song debuted and peaked at number 12 on the UK Singles Chart and the album debuted at number 10 on the UK Albums Chart, selling over 27 thousand copies in the country in its first week. The second single off the album, "Rest Your Love", was released on the same day as the album.

In December 2015, The Vamps announced that they had signed the British band New Hope Club and that they would be one of the opening acts in the UK leg of their Wake Up World Tour.

In January 2016, The Vamps released their version of "Kung Fu Fighting" for the animated film Kung Fu Panda 3, which was accompanied by a music video. On 1 April 2016, a new version of "I Found a Girl", featuring Jamaican rapper Omi, was released as the third and last single off their second album. The song debuted at number 30 on the UK Singles Chart. On 16 August 2016, The Vamps were featured on Vishal Dadlani & Shekhar Ravjiani’s song "Beliya", a Bollywood-pop song.

=== 2016–2019: Autobiography, "All Night", and Night & Day ===
On 7 October 2016, The Vamps announced in a livestream via Facebook that the first single of their third studio album, both with no names revealed at the time, would be released on 14 October 2016, with an exclusive release on Capital FM on the previous day. On the same day, hints of the name and lyrics of the single started being posted on the band's social medias and Spotify, following the same style as the hits for "Wake Up" single and album in September 2015. It was also announced that the album would be out in Summer 2017. On 12 October 2016, the band announced via livestream that the single would be called "All Night" and would be a collaboration with Norwegian DJ Matoma. The song peaked at number 24 on the UK Singles Chart, number six on the Irish Singles Chart, number 13 on the Norwegian Singles Chart, number 12 on the New Zealand Singles Chart, and also became their first entry on the Canadian Hot 100 chart, peaking at number 72. It became the most charted and certified single of the band and their most streamed song on Spotify. On 20 October 2016, The Vamps released their autobiography The Vamps: Our Story 100% Official, which had been announced months earlier.

"Middle of the Night", a collaboration with Danish DJ Martin Jensen, was announced as the second single of the album on 21 April 2017 and was released on 28 April 2017, the same day their Middle of the Night Tour started. During the first show of the tour, it was announced that the name of their third album is Night & Day and will be released in two parts. The first part, Night Edition, was set to be released in July 2017 and the second one, Day Edition, was set to be released in July 2018. On 3 May 2017, a video explaining more about the album was uploaded on their social media. On 19 May 2017, Swedish DJ Mike Perry released the single "Hands", a collaboration between himself, The Vamps, and American singer Sabrina Carpenter, which was included in the album. The first part of the album, Night Edition, was released on 14 July 2017 and debuted atop the UK Albums Chart, becoming the band's first number one album.

On 20 April 2018, the band released the singles "Too Good to Be True", "Personal", "Hair Too Long", and "Just My Type" from their album's Day Edition. On 13 July 2018, they released the Day Edition album which debuted at number one on the Official Scottish Albums Chart and number two on the UK Albums Chart.

On 27 July 2018, they released the single "We Don't Care", a collaboration with English DJ Sigala. In March 2019, "All the Lies", a collaboration with Brazilian DJ Alok and German producer Felix Jaehn, was released.

The Missing You EP was released on 25 April 2019. The four-track EP consists of title track "Missing You", "Right Now" (a collaboration with Krept and Konan), "Waves" and an acoustic version of "All the Lies". The EP marked the band taking charge of their music and creative direction as they co-wrote and co-produced the entire body of work.

=== 2020–present: Cherry Blossom and Ten Years of The Vamps ===
On 30 July 2020, they announced their fifth studio album Cherry Blossom. The lead single "Married in Vegas" was released on the same day as the album pre-order. The album was released on 16 October 2020 and debuted and number one on the UK charts. The album was supported by two more singles, "Better" and "Chemicals". They also held the 2020 virtual live stream concert Live at Hackney Round Chapel. In 2021 they released a music video for "Would You", featured on Alok and Bloodlines single "Another You", and embarked on the Cherry Blossom Tour across the UK. In 2022 they supported Picture This on the Ireland dates of their Life in Colour Tour and headlined The Vamps Barcelona Weekender.

During August and September 2022 they released four compilation EPs: Collabs by Brad, Hidden Gems by James, Acoustic by Connor, and Live by Tristan. This followed with the release of their first greatest hits album Ten Years of The Vamps. The album was released digitally on 14 October 2022, along with a CD+fanzine version which included limited edition merchandise, a CD with previously unreleased songs, and a zine book of the band's ten-year history. The fanzine was produced as a collaboration with the band and fans. On 18 November 2022, they released the single "Seat at the Table". Throughout 2022 and 2023 they embarked on the Ten Years of The Vamps - The Greatest Hits Tour.

The band released a stripped down version of "Somebody to You" on 7 June 2024, titled "Somebody to You (ReVamped)", the first of stripped down re-recordings of tracks from their debut album Meet the Vamps to be released. Two more of these were released, "Last Night (ReVamped)" and "Oh Cecilia (Breaking My Heart) (ReVamped)", before the band released Meet the Vamps (ReVamped) on 20 September 2024, featuring six stripped down re-recordings of tracks from Meet the Vamps.

== Style ==
The group have been compared to One Direction and labelled a boy band since their first fame in late 2012, a label which continued to be applied in 2014. The band disagree with the stereotyping, pointing to the fact that they formed by themselves—they are not the product of a record producer—and they play their own instruments. They have been inspired by McFly, Blink-182, Ed Sheeran, Mumford & Sons, Taylor Swift, and Justin Bieber.

== Members ==
- Bradley Will "Brad" Simpson (born 28 July 1995) is from Sutton Coldfield, West Midlands, England. He sings lead vocals and plays guitar. Simpson met James Brittain-McVey via YouTube in 2012 (McVey's profile says 2011) and began working on their debut album soon after. In February 2025, he released his debut solo album The Panic Years, which reached #7 on The UK Albums Chart.
- James Daniel Brittain-McVey (né McVey, born 30 April 1993) is from Bournemouth, Dorset, England. He is the lead guitarist and sings backing vocals. Brittain-McVey met Brad Simpson via YouTube in 2011 (Simpson's profile says 2012) and began working on their debut album soon after. Before joining the band, Brittain-McVey released an EP on 5 December 2009, Who I Am. Brittain-McVey was a contestant on the 18th series of I'm a Celebrity...Get Me Out of Here!, he finished in 5th place. In January 2019, he got engaged to his girlfriend Kirstie Brittain, and they married on 30 October 2021 at Lulworth Castle in Dorset.
- Connor Samuel John Ball (né Stephen, born 15 March 1996 in Aberdeen, Scotland) is from Hatton, Warwickshire, England. He plays bass guitar and sings backing vocals. He was the last to join the band. He started a new band Lunars with Cheat Codes' Sasa Macek. Ball was a contestant on the 14th series of Dancing on Ice, where he finished at the semifinals stage, with his professional partner Alexandra Schauman.
- Tristan Oliver Vance Evans (born 15 August 1994) is from Exeter, Devon, England. He plays drums and sings backing vocals. Evans also acts as a producer for the band, particularly with their covers. Evans married his fiancée in February 2025, and became a father to a son in April 2025.

== Discography ==
- Meet the Vamps (2014)
- Wake Up (2015)
- Night & Day (Night Edition) (2017) and Night & Day (Day Edition) (2018)
- Cherry Blossom (2020)

== Awards and nominations ==
Award	Year	Category	Work	Result
4Music Video Honours	2013	Your Best Breakthrough	The Vamps	Won
The Hot Hits Awards	2013	Favourite New Artist	The Vamps	Won
The Hot Hits Awards	2013	Best Group	The Vamps	Won
BBC Radio 1 Teen Awards	2014	Friday Download's Best Breakthrough Award	The Vamps	Won
BBC Radio 1 Teen Awards	2014	Best British Group	The Vamps	Won
BBC Radio 1 Teen Awards	2014	Best British Single	"Last Night"	Won
Melty Future Awards	2014	Prix Spécial International	The Vamps	Won
Melty Future Awards	2014	UK Favourite Breakthrough	The Vamps	Won
Radio Disney Music Awards	2014	The Freshest-Best New Artist	The Vamps	Nominated
Teen Choice Awards	2014	Love Song	"Somebody to You" (featuring Demi Lovato)	Nominated
Teen Choice Awards	2014	Breakout Group	The Vamps	Nominated
World Music Awards	2014	World's Best Song	"Can We Dance"	Nominated
World Music Awards	2014	World's Best Song	"Wild Heart"	Nominated
World Music Awards	2014	World's Best Video	"Can We Dance"	Nominated
World Music Awards	2014	World's Best Video	"Wild Heart"	Nominated
World Music Awards	2014	World's Best Album	Meet the Vamps	Nominated
World Music Awards	2014	World's Best Group	The Vamps	Nominated
World Music Awards	2014	World's Best Live Act	The Vamps	Nominated
Scottish Awards	2015	Scottish Fashion Icon of the Year	Connor Ball	Won
BBC Radio 1 Teen Awards	2016	Best British Group	The Vamps	Won
Teen Choice Awards	2016	Choice Song Group	"Wake Up"	Nominated
Teen Choice Awards	2017	Choice Music Group	The Vamps	Nominated
iHeartRadio Music Awards	2018	Best Boyband	The Vamps	Nominated

== Tours ==
The Vamps supported McFly on their Memory Lane Tour in April and May 2013, and Selena Gomez at London's Hammersmith Apollo on 7 and 8 September 2013. In October, it was announced that The Vamps would support Taylor Swift on the London leg of her Red Tour in February 2014, and The Wanted on the UK and Ireland leg of their Word of Mouth World Tour from 14 March to 1 April.

On 12 February 2014, the band announced that they will be headlining their own UK tour in September and October 2014 to support their debut album. They also went on several tours in Asia, the UK and North America. They had their world tour in 2016 to support their second album. They had several tours to support the release of the Night Edition of their third album. The band announced their upcoming USA 2018 Tour and Four Corners Tour 2019 to support the release of the Day Edition of their third album.

=== Headlining ===
- Meet the Vamps Tour (2014–2015)
- Wake Up European Fan-Fest Tour (2015)
- Wake Up World Tour (2016)
- Middle of the Night Tour (2017)
- Night & Day: Up Close and Personal Tour (2017)
- Night & Day Tour (2018)
- Four Corners Tour (2019)
- Live at Hackney Round Chapel (2020, livestream)
- Cherry Blossom Tour (2021)
- The Vamps Barcelona Weekender (2022)
- Greatest Hits World Tour (2022–2023)

=== Supporting ===
- McFly - Memory Lane Tour (2013)
- Selena Gomez - Stars Dance Tour (UK, 7 and 8 September 2013)
- Taylor Swift - Red Tour (shows in London, UK, February 2014)
- R5 - Louder World Tour (show in Birmingham, March 2014)
- The Wanted - Word of Mouth Tour (UK & Ireland, 12 to 31 March and 1 April 2014)
- Austin Mahone - Live on Tour (North America, July & August 2014)
- Little Mix - The Glory Days Tour (Europe)
- Picture This - Life in Colour Tour (Ireland, 2022)
