= You Can't Spell Slaughter Without Laughter =

Studio album by I Set My Friends on Fire
- Released: October 7, 2008
- Studio: Earth Sound Recording, Valdosta, Georgia
- Genre: Post-hardcore; electronicore; crunkcore; metalcore
- Length: 35:05
- Label: Epitaph
- Producer: Travis Richter; Nabil Moo

I Set My Friends on Fire chronology
I Set My Friends On Fire EP (2008)	You Can't Spell Slaughter Without Laughter (2008)	Astral Rejection (2011)

You Can't Spell Slaughter Without Laughter is the debut full-length studio album by American post-hardcore band I Set My Friends on Fire, released on October 7, 2008, via Epitaph Records. It includes the band's most famous song, "Things That Rhyme With Orange", a promotional video for which was released July 22, 2009. Four of the album's tracks are re-released songs from the band's self-released EP I Set My Friends On Fire EP. The album reached #29 on the Billboard Top Heatseekers chart.

== Track listing ==
All lyrics are written by Matt Mehana, except where noted; all music is composed by Nabil Moo, except where noted.

No.	Title	Writer(s)	Length
1.	"Sh!t It Talks... I'm Out of Here"		1:03
2.	"Brief Interviews with Hideous Men"		1:37
3.	"Beauty Is in the Eyes of the Beerholder"		2:26
4.	"Things That Rhyme with Orange"		3:24
5.	"ASL"		2:42
6.	"Interlude"		1:52
7.	"Ravenous, Ravenous Rhinos"		2:42
8.	"HxC 2-Step"		3:18
9.	"WTFWJD"		3:08
10.	"Crank That" (Soulja Boy cover)	DeAndre Way	3:02
11.	"But the Nuns Are Watching"		3:26
12.	"Reese's Pieces, I Don't Know Who John Cleese Is?"		6:26
Total length:			35:05

== Reception ==
Professional ratings
Review scores
Source	Rating
Alternative Press	0.5/5 stars
ChartAttack	3/5 stars
Montreal Mirror	2/10 stars
Punk News	1/5 stars
Slant Magazine	0.5/5 stars

You Can't Spell Slaughter Without Laughter was panned by most music critics. The album received a 0.5 rating out of five from Slant reviewer Nate Adams, who said "[It's] high in the running for worst album of the year ... The music aims for brutality and melody, but misses the mark entirely on both counts." Alternative Press reviewer Phil Freeman also gave the album a half star out of five, remarking that the album "truly fails because it has exactly zero memorable moments".

In a mixed review, John Lucas of the Georgia Straight said that the album "seems designed to test the listener’s tolerance", but that "those willing to embrace a noisy, ambitious, self-indulgent, and downright weird record will find a lot to love". Logan Broger of ChartAttack gave it three stars out of five, saying, "When the grind-electro-hardcore-pop duo aren't being obnoxious or comedic, there are some tunes that are actually really, really brilliant."

== Personnel ==
You Can't Spell Slaughter Without Laughter album personnel as listed on Allmusic.

I Set My Friends On Fire

- Matt Mehana – lead vocals, lyrics
- Nabil Moo – programming, guitars, bass, keyboards, drums, songwriting, additional vocals

Production

- Travis Richter – production
- Nabil Moo – production
- Jeff Abarta – production, management
- Lee Dyess – engineering, mixing
- Ted Jensen – mastering
- Kamal Moo – management
- Sally Koening – legal
- Brett Gurewitz – artist and repertoire
- Nick Pritchard – artwork, design
