= New Hope Club (album) =

Studio album by New Hope Club
- Released: 14 February 2020
- Length: 41:53
- Labels: Hollywood; Virgin; Universal
- Producers: Jarly; Kin; Ian Kirkpatrick; Jintae Ko; Mac & Phil; John Martin; Rick Parkhouse; PhD; R3hab; Matt Rad; Rice N' Peas; Blake Richardson; Jordan Riley; Louis Schoorl; George Tizzard; Chris Wallace; Young Skeptics; Michel Zitron

New Hope Club chronology
Welcome to the Club Pt. 2 (2018)	New Hope Club (2020)

Singles from New Hope Club
- 1. "Permission" Released: 1 February 2019; 2. "Love Again" Released: 3 May 2019; 3. "Know Me Too Well" Released: 4 October 2019; 4. "Let Me Down Slow" Released: 17 January 2020

New Hope Club is the self-titled debut studio album by British pop trio New Hope Club, released on 14 February 2020, by Hollywood, Virgin and Universal Records. The album features guest appearances from Mexican singer Danna Paola and Dutch-Moroccan DJ R3hab. Commercially, the album peaked at number 5 on the UK albums chart and number 7 on the Irish albums chart.

== Background ==
After the album wasn't released in August, on 24 September 2019, the band announced on their social media that their album, still untitled would be released in February 2020. On 18 December 2019, the band officially announced the title and release date for the album.

== Singles ==
"Permission" was released as the album's lead single on 1 February 2019.

"Love Again" was released as the album's second single on 3 May 2019. The song's music video was released on 16 May 2019 and features American actress Bailee Madison.

"Know Me Too Well" with Mexican singer Danna Paola was released as the album's third single on 4 October 2019. The song's music video was shot in Valencia, Spain.

"Let Me Down Slow" with Dutch-Moroccan DJ R3hab was released as the album's fourth single on 17 January 2020. The song impacted contemporary hit radio in the United States on 25 February 2020. The song's acoustic version was released on 28 February 2020.

=== Other songs ===
The songs "Crazy", "Medicine", "Karma" and the original version of "Let Me Down Slow" appear on the album after previously being released on the trio's second EP Welcome to the Club Pt. 2 (2018).

== Track listing ==
New Hope Club – Standard edition
No.	Title	Writer(s)	Producer(s)	Length
1.	"Love Again"	Andrew Bullimore; Blake Richardson; Daniel Davidsen; George Smith; Kane John Parfitt; Peter Wallevik; Reece Bibby	PhD; Jez Ashurst^{[v]}	3:23
2.	"Let Me Down Slow" (with R3hab)	Joakim Jarl; John Martin Lindström; Max McElligott; Michel Zitron	Jarly; John Martin; Zitron; R3hab; Cameron Gower Poole^{[v]}	2:55
3.	"Know Me Too Well" (featuring Danna Paola)	Richardson; Bruno Valverde; Paola; Smith; Grace Barker; Hajar Sbihi; Parfitt; Bibby; Sam Merrifield	Kin; Young Skeptics; Valverde^{[v]}; Sbihi^{[v]}	3:20
4.	"Permission"	Jaramye Daniels; Katie Pearlman; Matthew Holmes; Phil Plested; Philip Leigh	Mac & Phil; Matt Rad	3:14
5.	"Fixed"	George Tizzard; Rick Parkhouse; Roy Stride	Tizzard; Parkhouse	3:44
6.	"Medicine"	Richardson; Chris Wallace; Smith; Isaac Elliot; Jared William Lee; Bibby	Wallace; Rad^{[c]}	3:25
7.	"Give Me Time"	Richardson; Smith; Bibby	Richardson	2:37
8.	"Serious"	Richardson; Smith; Lauren Christy; Louis Schoorl; Bibby	Schoorl	3:23
9.	"Crazy"	Dewain Whitmore; Ian Kirkpatrick; Ilsey Juber; Jason Evigan	Kirkpatrick; Dreamlab^{[v]}	3:54
10.	"Let Me Down Slow"	Jarly; Martin; McElligott; Zitron	Jordan Riley; Poole^{[v]}	2:42
11.	"You and I"	Richardson; Smith; Holmes; Plested; Leigh; Bibby; Stride	Mac & Phil	3:16
12.	"Why Oh Why"	Bullimore; Richardson; Smith; Jeremy Dussolliet; Mike Waters; Bibby; Timothy Sommers	Rice N' Peas; Sommers^{[v]}	3:02
13.	"Karma"	Richardson; Smith; Bibby	Richardson; Jintae Ko	2:58
Total length:				41:53

New Hope Club – Blake Edition
No.	Title	Writer(s)	Producer(s)	Length
1.	"Love Again"	Bullimore; Richardson; Davidsen; Smith; Parfitt; Wallevik; Bibby	PhD; Ashurst^{[v]}	3:23
2.	"Let Me Down Slow" (with R3hab)	Jarly; Martin; McElligott; Zitron	Jarly; Martin; Zitron; R3hab; Poole^{[v]}	2:55
3.	"Know Me Too Well" (featuring Danna Paola)	Richardson; Valverde; Paola; Smith; Barker; Sbihi; Parfitt; Bibby; Merrifield	Kin; Young Skeptics; Valverde^{[v]}; Sbihi^{[v]}	3:20
4.	"Permission"	Daniels; Pearlman; Holmes; Plested; Leigh	Mac & Phil; Rad	3:14
5.	"Fixed"	Tizzard; Parkhouse; Stride	Tizzard; Parkhouse	3:44
6.	"Medicine"	Richardson; Wallace; Smith; Elliot; Lee; Bibby	Wallace; Rad^{[c]}	3:25
7.	"Give Me Time"	Richardson; Smith; Bibby	Richardson	2:37
8.	"Serious"	Richardson; Smith; Christy; Schoorl; Bibby	Schoorl	3:23
9.	"Crazy"	Whitmore; Kirkpatrick; Juber; Evigan	Kirkpatrick; Dreamlab^{[v]}	3:54
10.	"You and I"	Richardson; Smith; Holmes; Plested; Leigh; Bibby; Stride	Mac & Phil	3:16
11.	"Just To Find Love"	Richardson; Smith; Bibby	New Hope Club	2:52
12.	"We Broke Up In a Dream"	Richardson; Smith; Bibby	New Hope Club	3:05
Total length:				39:08

New Hope Club – George Edition
No.	Title	Writer(s)	Producer(s)	Length
1.	"Love Again"	Bullimore; Richardson; Davidsen; Smith; Parfitt; Wallevik; Bibby	PhD; Ashurst^{[v]}	3:23
2.	"Let Me Down Slow" (with R3hab)	Jarly; Martin; McElligott; Zitron	Jarly; Martin; Zitron; R3hab; Poole^{[v]}	2:55
3.	"Know Me Too Well" (featuring Danna Paola)	Richardson; Valverde; Paola; Smith; Barker; Sbihi; Parfitt; Bibby; Merrifield	Kin; Young Skeptics; Valverde^{[v]}; Sbihi^{[v]}	3:20
4.	"Permission"	Daniels; Pearlman; Holmes; Plested; Leigh	Mac & Phil; Rad	3:14
5.	"Fixed"	Tizzard; Parkhouse; Stride	Tizzard; Parkhouse	3:44
6.	"Medicine"	Richardson; Wallace; Smith; Elliot; Lee; Bibby	Wallace; Rad^{[c]}	3:25
7.	"Give Me Time"	Richardson; Smith; Bibby	Richardson	2:37
8.	"Serious"	Richardson; Smith; Christy; Schoorl; Bibby	Schoorl	3:23
9.	"Crazy"	Whitmore; Kirkpatrick; Juber; Evigan	Kirkpatrick; Dreamlab^{[v]}	3:54
10.	"You and I"	Richardson; Smith; Holmes; Plested; Leigh; Bibby; Stride	Mac & Phil	3:16
11.	"Flight Away"	Richardson; Smith; Bibby	New Hope Club	3:22
12.	"Remember"	Richardson; Smith; Bibby	New Hope Club	2:51
Total length:				39:24

New Hope Club – Reece Edition
No.	Title	Writer(s)	Producer(s)	Length
1.	"Love Again"	Bullimore; Richardson; Davidsen; Smith; Parfitt; Wallevik; Bibby	PhD; Ashurst^{[v]}	3:23
2.	"Let Me Down Slow" (with R3hab)	Jarly; Martin; McElligott; Zitron	Jarly; Martin; Zitron; R3hab; Poole^{[v]}	2:55
3.	"Know Me Too Well" (featuring Danna Paola)	Richardson; Valverde; Paola; Smith; Barker; Sbihi; Parfitt; Bibby; Merrifield	Kin; Young Skeptics; Valverde^{[v]}; Sbihi^{[v]}	3:20
4.	"Permission"	Daniels; Pearlman; Holmes; Plested; Leigh	Mac & Phil; Rad	3:14
5.	"Fixed"	Tizzard; Parkhouse; Stride	Tizzard; Parkhouse	3:44
6.	"Medicine"	Richardson; Wallace; Smith; Elliot; Lee; Bibby	Wallace; Rad^{[c]}	3:25
7.	"Give Me Time"	Richardson; Smith; Bibby	Richardson	2:37
8.	"Serious"	Richardson; Smith; Christy; Schoorl; Bibby	Schoorl	3:23
9.	"Crazy"	Whitmore; Kirkpatrick; Juber; Evigan	Kirkpatrick; Dreamlab^{[v]}	3:54
10.	"You and I"	Richardson; Smith; Holmes; Plested; Leigh; Bibby; Stride	Mac & Phil	3:16
11.	"How To Say I Love You"	Richardson; Smith; Bibby	New Hope Club	3:30
12.	"Turning Red"	Richardson; Smith; Bibby	New Hope Club	3:44
Total length:				40:25

New Hope Club – Japanese Edition (bonus tracks)
No.	Title	Writer(s)	Producer(s)	Length
14.	"Just To Find Love"	Richardson; Smith; Bibby	New Hope Club	3:52
15.	"We Broke Up In A Dream"	Richardson; Smith; Bibby	New Hope Club	3:05
16.	"Flight Away"	Richardson; Smith; Bibby	New Hope Club	3:22
17.	"Remember"	Richardson; Smith; Bibby	New Hope Club	2:51
18.	"How To Say I Love You"	Richardson; Smith; Bibby	New Hope Club	3:30
19.	"Turning Red"	Richardson; Smith; Bibby	New Hope Club	3:44
Total length:				1:02:17

Japan deluxe edition bonus DVD
No.	Title	Length
1.	"Film Documentary (The Love Again World Tour)"	59:56
2.	"Love Again" (Audio Contents)	3:25
3.	"Let Me Down Slow (with R3hab)" (Audio Contents)	2:55
4.	"Know Me Too Well (featuring Danna Paola)" (Audio Contents)	3:22
5.	"Permission" (Audio Contents)	3:12
6.	"Fixed" (Audio Contents)	3:44
7.	"Medicine" (Audio Contents)	3:26
8.	"Give Me Time" (Audio Contents)	2:36
9.	"Serious" (Audio Contents)	3:23
10.	"Crazy" (Audio Contents)	3:54
11.	"You and I" (Audio Contents)	3:16
Total length:		1:31:15

=== Notes ===
- ^{^[v]} signifies a vocal producer
- ^{^[c]} signifies a co-producer

== Charts ==
Chart (2020)	Peak position
Irish Albums (Official Charts)	7
Scottish Albums (Official Charts)	3
UK Albums (Official Charts)	5
UK Album Downloads (Official Charts)	47
South Korean Albums (Circle)	43

== Release history ==
Region	Date	Format(s)	Label	Ref.
Various	14 February 2020	Digital download; streaming; CD; vinyl	Hollywood; Virgin; Universal	

== Tours ==
Due to the COVID-19 pandemic, the band had to postpone their 2020 tour in support of the album to April 2021. In replacement they held a virtual world tour of different countries streaming for free on YouTube.

=== New Hope Club Virtual World Tour ===
Date	Country	Venue	Attendance	Runtime	Ref.
17 July 2020	Argentina	YouTube Streaming	40,000+	46:11	
19 July 2020	Brazil	YouTube Streaming	35,000+	54:07	
22 July 2020	Mexico	YouTube Streaming	24,000+	45:06	
24 July 2020	United States	YouTube Streaming	24,000+	43:20	
26 July 2020	Canada	YouTube Streaming	20,000+	33:59	
29 July 2020	France	YouTube Streaming	17,000+	42:39	
31 July 2020	Sweden	YouTube Streaming	15,000+	30:13	
2 August 2020	Poland	YouTube Streaming	14,000+	31:21	
5 August 2020	Spain	YouTube Streaming	15,000+	30:08	
7 August 2020	Netherlands	YouTube Streaming	12,000+	30:07	
9 August 2020	Germany	YouTube Streaming	13,000+	32:17	
12 August 2020	Italy	YouTube Streaming	12,000+	25:11	
14 August 2020	Russia	YouTube Streaming	14,000+	29:31	
16 August 2020	South Korea	YouTube Streaming	32,000+	38:08	
19 August 2020	Japan	YouTube Streaming	14,000+	29:44	
21 August 2020	Philippines	YouTube Streaming	11,000+	25:57	
23 August 2020	Indonesia	YouTube Streaming	25,000+	37:12	
26 August 2020	Australia	YouTube Streaming	784		
28 August 2020	Ireland	YouTube Streaming			
30 August 2020	United Kingdom	YouTube Streaming			
