= Last Night (The Vamps song) =

Single by The Vamps

from the album Meet the Vamps
- Released: 6 April 2014
- Recorded: 2013
- Genre: Pop rock
- Length: 3:07
- Label: Mercury; Virgin EMI
- Songwriter(s): Wayne Hector; Tom Barnes; Pete Kelleher; Ben Kohn; Ayak Thiik
- Producer(s): TMS

The Vamps singles chronology
| "Wild Heart" (2014) | "Last Night" (2014) | "Somebody to You" (2014) |

Music video
- "Last Night" on YouTube

"Last Night" is a song by the British pop rock band The Vamps. It was released in the United Kingdom on 6 April 2014 as the third single from their first studio album, Meet the Vamps (2014). The song was written by Wayne Hector, TMS and Ayak Thiik and was produced by TMS. It entered the UK Singles Chart at number two, matching the success of "Can We Dance".

== Background ==
On 20 February 2014, The Vamps announced that "Last Night" would be their next single.

== Critical reception ==
Lewis Corner of Digital Spy gave the song a mixed review, writing:

"Co-written by hit-maker Wayne Hector (One Direction, Nicki Minaj), 'Last Night' is a sugary pop-rock anthem packed with carefree youth and mischief. "Yeah last night I think we were dancing/ Singing all our favourite songs," they recollect over fizzy guitar riffs and jump-around beats, before they coyly admit: "Think I might have kissed someone." It unashamedly plays up to its target audience, but with pop hooks more chewy and sweet than jelly beans, it has all the potential to pull in the larger crowd."

== Music video ==
The music video was uploaded to YouTube on 26 February 2014. As of December 31, 2019, the video has almost 39 million views.

== Track listing ==
- Digital download
1. "Last Night" – 3:07
- Digital download - EP
1. "Last Night" (Gospel version) – 2:53
2. "Oh Cecilia (Breaking My Heart)" [Live From The O2 Arena] – 4:25
3. "What About Love" – 3:24
4. "Lovestruck" – 3:40
5. "Last Night" (WestFunk Club remix) – 4:46
- Digital download - Remix EP
1. "Last Night" (Live at the O2) – 3:20
2. "Last Night" (Connor's Version) – 3:10
3. "Last Night" (Tristan's Animal Remix) – 3:52
- CD1
1. "Last Night" - 3:07
2. "Surfin USA"
3. "High Hopes"
4. "Story of My Life" (Live)
- CD2
1. "Last Night" (Connor's version) - 3:10
2. "All I Want" (James' version)
- DVD
1. "Last Night" (Music video) - 3:07
2. "Carry on Vamping on Tour" (documentary)

== Charts and certifications ==
=== Charts ===
| Chart (2014) | Peak position |
|---|---|
| Australia (ARIA) | 37 |
| Ireland (IRMA) | 12 |
| Scotland (OCC) | 2 |
| UK Singles (OCC) | 2 |

=== Certifications ===
| Region | Certification | Certified units/sales |
|---|---|---|
| United Kingdom (BPI) | Silver | 200,000^{‡} |
^{‡} Sales+streaming figures based on certification alone.

== Release history ==
| Country | Date | Format | Label | Ref. |
|---|---|---|---|---|
| Australia | 28 March 2014 | Digital download | Virgin EMI | |
| Ireland | 6 April 2014 | Digital download; EP | Virgin EMI | |
| United Kingdom | 6 April 2014 | Digital download; EP | Virgin EMI | |
