= I Set My Friends on Fire =

American post-hardcore band

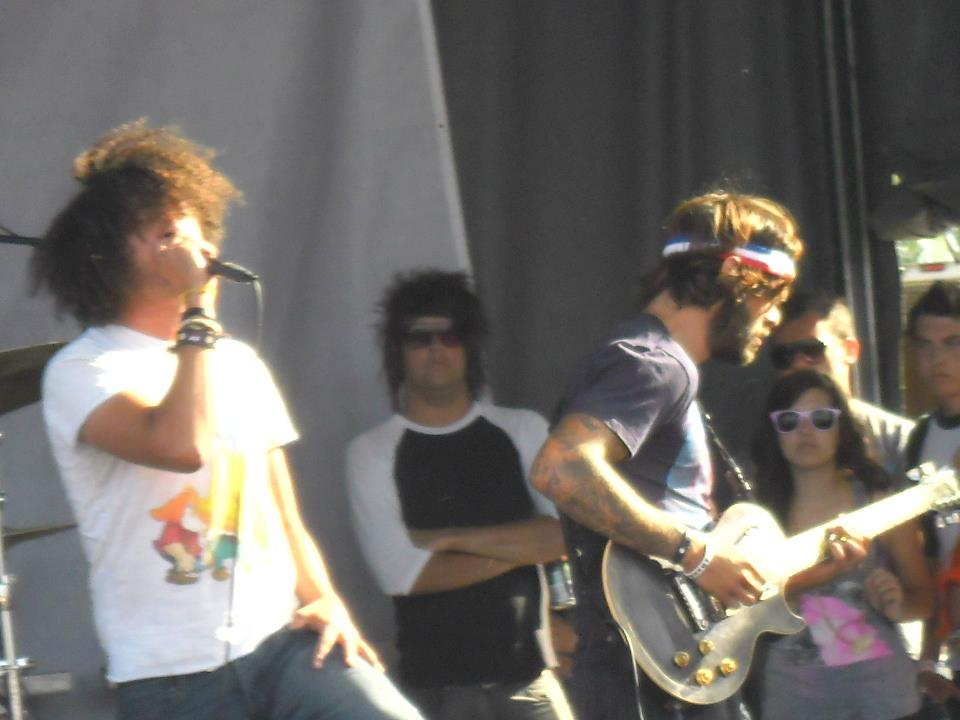
- Matt Mehana with Joe Nelson, at Vans Warped Tour 2011

Background information
- Origin: Miami, Florida, U.S.
- Genres: Post-hardcore; electronicore; screamo
- Years active: 2007–present
- Labels: Warner Music Group; Tragic Hero; Epitaph
- Spinoff of: We Are the Cavalry
- Members: Matt Mehana; Chris Thompson; Connor Mitchener; Cobrette Bardole; Hector Diaz
- Past members: Nabil Moo; Chris Lent; Nate Blasdell; Jonathan Rosell; Jimmy Bennett

I Set My Friends on Fire (often abbreviated as ISMFOF) is an American post-hardcore band from Miami, Florida. The band was formed in 2007 by Matt Mehana and Nabil Moo. The group signed with Epitaph Records before releasing their debut album, You Can't Spell Slaughter Without Laughter, in 2008. Drummer Chris Lent joined the band in 2009. The group's second album, Astral Rejection, was scheduled to be released on June 22, 2010, but it was shelved for a year by Epitaph. Moo left the band in 2010, then Lent left the band. The group's third album, Caterpillar Sex, was announced in 2013 but has never seen a release.

== History ==
=== I Set My Friends on Fire EP (2007–2008) ===
Matt Mehana and Nabil Moo performed previously in a local band named We Are the Cavalry. After the band disbanded, Mehana and Moo began creating songs under the name I Set My Friends on Fire, a name that was inspired by a line of lyrics used in a We Are the Cavalry song. Some assumed that the new name was derived from the Aiden song of the same title. However, the group explained they were unaware of this at the time. Mehana has expressed his dismay over fans assuming that they used an Aiden song for their name, stating that Aiden "sucks". They garnered a large audience due in part to MySpace, where their first single, a rendition of Soulja Boy Tell 'Em's "Crank That (Soulja Boy)" (originally entitled "Crank That Cavalry Boy") received more than one million plays. The duo's MySpace page was removed three times because the MySpace staff believed that the duo were using software to increase the song's play count. The band released a self-titled EP before releasing their first album. The EP features the songs "Crank That", "ASL", and "Beauty Is in the Eye of the Beerholder".

=== You Can't Spell Slaughter Without Laughter (2008–2009) ===
The duo then signed to Epitaph Records, which released their debut album You Can't Spell Slaughter Without Laughter on October 7, 2008. The album garnered a negative to mixed reception from various critics. You Can't Spell Slaughter Without Laughter reached number 29 on the Billboard Top Heatseekers chart. The song "Things That Rhyme with Orange" was the second single from the album and their third career single.

=== Works with Smosh (2008–2009) ===
On November 21, 2008, the comedy duo Smosh had teamed up with I Set My Friends on Fire and released their first music video and second single, called "Sex Ed Rocks" which had over 20 million views. Later in September 2009, they teamed up yet again and released their second music video and fourth single, entitled "Four Years Foreplay" which attracted over 7 million views. "Four Years Foreplay" featured I Set My Friends On Fire's new drummer Chris Lent from From First To Last.

=== Astral Rejection and Nabil's Departure (2010–2012) ===
I Set My Friends on Fire entered the studio in early 2010 to write and record their second album. The group performed at The Bamboozle music festival in New Jersey on May 1, 2010, and then entered the studio for a second time on June 2, 2010, to finish their upcoming album.

On July 20, 2010, Matt explained in a YouTube interview that Nabil had left the band to focus on school and to be with his family.

The first single from the album, "Excite Dyke", was released exclusively via digital download on June 15, 2010, as part of a new Epitaph compilation CD entitled "New Noise Vol. 1".

The full album Astral Rejection was released and streamed on ISMFOF's website on June 16, 2011. Astral Rejection was released in stores on June 21, 2011. On July 18, the music video for "It Comes Naturally" was released on YouTube directed by Nicholas Lent and co-founder and ex-member Nabil Moo.

=== Caterpillar Sex (2013–2017) ===
In September 2015, Mehana announced that the band had a new line up. In November, the band departed on their first tour in over three years. They toured consistently for the next nine months, playing over 150 shows in 24 countries.

Mehana had started releasing several demos for a new album entitled Caterpillar Sex. These demos showed a much more experimental side, being almost completely electronic with no real drums, and very little guitar. Caterpillar Sex was postponed many times, with Mehana stating that his style kept changing. The album was slated to be released on July 21, 2017, and was expected to contain 24 tracks. Its first single, entitled "The Vision and Scarlet Witch," was released on June 28, 2017. According to the band's official Facebook page, the album has still gone unreleased, no reason has been given, but issues with their label at the time are a likely culprit.

=== My Uzi Holds A Hundred Round Conscience (2017) ===
On December 9, 2016, the band announced on their Facebook page that they have signed to Tragic Hero Records and have released the first single from their upcoming fourth studio album My Uzi Holds A Hundred Round Conscience. A music video was also filmed for the single. In early 2017, I Set My Friends on Fire toured the United States, Canada, Europe, and Russia. The Canadian leg of the tour was independently organized by Eitan Melody of The Foundation Agency, who served as both the booking agent and tour manager for the run. The band was never paid. I Set My Friends on Fire were supported on the Canadian dates by Glass Houses and Her Majesty The King. The tour concluded in St. Catharines, Ontario, on March 18. The band announced that they were going to be on the first ever Tragic Hero Records Tour as direct support for The Dead Rabbitts in June and July. The album was scheduled for July 21 but had been pushed to Fall due to unforeseen "production issues", as of December 2019 neither this album or Caterpillar Sex have seen release.

=== 10 Years Of Slaughter, fourth record, Original Astral Rejection, Caterpillar Sex update (2018–present) ===
In January 2018, the band announced that they would be doing a 10 Year anniversary tour for "You Can't Spell Slaughter Without Laughter" called 10 Years Of Slaughter tour. Later that week, the band announced their first leg which covered major cities in the US and also announced Kissing Candice and Awaken I am as support. The tour kicked off on February 15 in Pittsburgh and ended March 16th in Oklahoma City. The tour consisted of multiple festival appearances and headline shows in small clubs, which resulted in most dates selling out.

On March 20, the band announced a second leg of the tour which covered major cities in Canada and cities they had previously missed in the US on the first leg. The next day, the Germany-based Metal band Annisokay was announced as direct support. Red Handed Denial and The Funeral Portrait were then announced as the other support bands on this tour.

In April, the band announced they were in the studio recording the rest of the fourth record.

The band went on to tour Europe in October and released a new single titled "Don't Take Me For Pomegranate" featuring rapper Lil Lotus.

In an interview with DEAD PRESS! while touring the UK in 2018, Mehana shared that Epitaph Records' decision to scrap the original version of their second record Astral Rejection caused tension between him and Moo, and that the stress forced him to leave the band. Mehana was then left to handle the writing duties solo, later recruiting Chris Lent of From First To Last into the line-up.

Reportedly, in the same interview, Mehana stated that Epitaph Records have since been in touch with him with the intention of releasing the originally recorded album officially under the name of "O.G. Astral Rejection" or "Original Astral Rejection".

On March 7, 2019, the band confirmed that the shelved and original version of Astral Rejection would get an official release through Epitaph Records on March 29, 2019.

== Musical style ==
"Infinite Suck"
"Infinite Suck", the second track on I Set My Friends on Fire's second album, Astral Rejection, demonstrates the band's experimental style and use of electronica characteristics.

I Set My Friends on Fire is recognized for their experimental musical style. The group blends elements from a variety of genres including electronica, crunkcore, post-hardcore, metalcore, electronicore, alternative metal, screamo, dance-pop, mathcore, and glitch. AllMusic describes the group's style as "a tornado of musical influences and genres".

== Band members ==
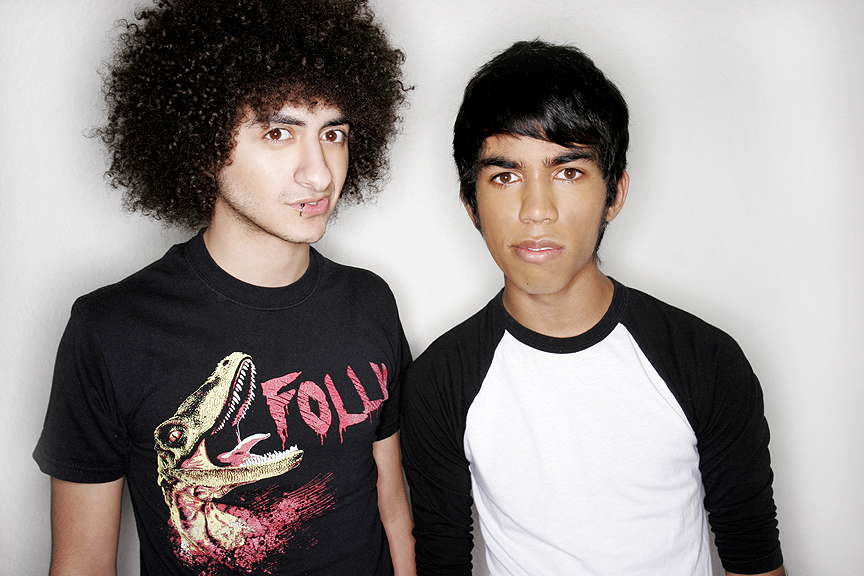
Matt Mehana and Nabil Moo in 2008

Current members

- Matt Mehana – lead vocals (2007–present), keyboards, programming (2010–present), guitar, bass, drums (2011–2014)
- Chris Thompson – drums (2016–present)
- Connor Mitchener – bass (2016–present)
- Cobrette Bardole – rhythm guitar, programming, backing vocals (2023–present), lead guitar (2023–2025)
- Hector Diaz – lead guitar (2025–present), rhythm guitar (2017–2022)

Former members

- Nabil Moo – guitar, keyboards, backing vocals, bass, sequencer, programming (2007–2010), drums (2007–2009)
- Chris Lent – drums (2009–2011), guitar, keyboards, sequencer (2010–2011)
- Nate Blasdell – lead guitar, backing vocals (2015–2022)
- Jonathan Rosell – rhythm guitar (2015–2017), bass (2015–2016)
- Josh Miller – drums (2015–2016)
- Jimmy Bennett – lead guitar, programming (2022–2023), rhythm guitar, backing vocals (2022–2023)

Touring members

- Blake Steiner – guitar (2010–2011)
- Evan Perry – DJ (2011)
- Ashton Howarth – guitar (2011)
- Andrew Tapley – guitar, bass (2011)
- Matt Mingus – drums (2012)
- Joe Nelson – guitar, backing vocals (2011–2012)
- Airick Delgado – guitar (2012)
- August Bartell – drums (2012)
- Evan Fortgang – guitar (2022–2023)
- Jacob Evans – guitar (2023)

Timeline

== Discography ==
=== Studio albums and extended plays ===
Date	Album	Label	Peak Chart Position	
Date	Album	Label	US Indie	US Heat
2008	I Set My Friends on Fire (EP)	Self-released	—	—
2008	You Can't Spell Slaughter Without Laughter	Epitaph	—	29
2011	Astral Rejection	Epitaph	47	9
2019	Astral Rejection (OG)	Epitaph	—	—
2019	Online Now! (EP) (w/ Lil Lotus)	Death Quartz	—	—
TBA	Caterpillar Sex	TBA	—	—
TBA	Forthcoming Fourth Album	TBA	—	—
"—" denotes a release that did not chart, or has not charted yet.

=== Singles ===
Name	Release date	Album
"Crank That"	September 16, 2008	You Can't Spell Slaughter Without Laughter
"Sex Ed Rocks"	November 21, 2008	Non-album single
"Things That Rhyme with Orange"	July 22, 2009	You Can't Spell Slaughter Without Laughter
"Four Years Foreplay"	September 17, 2009	Non-album single
"Excite Dyke"	June 15, 2010	Astral Rejection
"It Comes Naturally"	March 22, 2011	Astral Rejection
"Life Hertz"	May 24, 2011	Astral Rejection
"Astral Rejection"	June 14, 2011	Astral Rejection
"Midwife Toad"	April 16, 2013	Caterpillar Sex*
"The "D" in Capitation"	September 2, 2013	Caterpillar Sex*
"My Little Cabbage Planetarium"	December 13, 2013	Caterpillar Sex*
"Pro Seizures"	February 27, 2014	Caterpillar Sex*
"Nobody Wants To Be Parrot Man"	May 15, 2014	Caterpillar Sex*
"Nail Biting Therapy"	December 25, 2015	Caterpillar Sex*
"My Uzi Holds A Hundred Round Conscience"	December 9, 2016	TBA
"The Vision and Scarlet Witch"	June 28, 2017	Caterpillar Sex
"Don't Take Me For Pomegranate"	September 6, 2018	TBA
"Versace Tamagotchi"	June 12, 2019	TBA
"2 Short Breaths In 2 Minute Days"	June 13, 2020	Non-album single
"Addictions (Juice WRLD Cover)"	January 1, 2021	Non-album single
"PURÉE EVIL"	February 6, 2023	Non-album single

* these are possible songs to be released on this album, but are not verified

=== Music videos ===
Name	Release date	Album
"Sex Ed Rocks"	November 21, 2008	Non-album single
"Things That Rhyme With Orange"	July 22, 2009	You Can't Spell Slaughter Without Laughter
"Four Years Foreplay"	September 17, 2009	Non-album single
"Astral Rejection"	June 14, 2011	Astral Rejection
"It Comes Naturally"	July 18, 2011	Astral Rejection
"My Way (Featuring Johnytiger)" (Fetty Wap Cover)	September 7, 2015	Non-album single
"My Uzi Holds A Hundred Round Conscience"	December 9, 2016	TBA
