= Wake Up (The Vamps song) =

Single by The Vamps

from the album Wake Up
- Released: 2 October 2015
- Recorded: 2015
- Genre: Pop rock
- Length: 3:12 (album version); 5:21 (extended version)
- Label: Mercury; Virgin EMI
- Songwriters: Ammar Malik; Steve Mac; Ross Golan; Kevin Snevely
- Producer: Steve Mac

The Vamps singles chronology
"Oh Cecilia (Breaking My Heart)" (2014)	"Wake Up" (2015)	"Rest Your Love" (2015)

"Wake Up" is a song by British pop band the Vamps. It was released on 2 October 2015 as the lead single from their second studio album of the same name (2015).

== Music video ==
A music video was produced for the song and was released on 4 October 2015. It features the Vamps and the acting debut of Brooklyn Beckham.

The video shows multiple fans moving receivers, speakers and computers into positions around the city, with the Vamps themselves making their way to a radio station on the outskirts of the city. A video of the Vamps singing the song as glitchy images is seen on several devices, with the Vamps themselves talking about it in a van on the way to the radio station. A shot of Earth from the upper atmosphere is shown and the music volume lowers slightly. When the Vamps get to the radio station, they begin performing on the roof of it while some of their fans broadcast the video around the city, which shatters windows. Once they receive the broadcast, their fans start singing along.

== Track listings ==
- Digital download
1. "Wake Up" – 3:12
- Digital EP and CD single one
1. "Wake Up" (acoustic version) – 4:04
2. "Stay Here" – 3:51
3. "Risk It All" (live) – 5:30
4. "Burn" – 3:38
5. "Wake Up" (Spanish version) – 3:12
- CD single two
1. "Wake Up" – 3:12
2. "Boy Without a Car" – 3:29
- Digital download – extended version
1. "Wake Up" (extended version) – 5:21

== Charts ==
Chart (2015)	Peak position
Australia (ARIA)	65
Belgium (Ultratip Bubbling Under Flanders)	10
Belgium (Ultratop 50 Wallonia)	47
France (SNEP)	88
Ireland (IRMA)	46
Scotland Singles (OCC)	3
Spain (Promusicae)	20
UK Singles (OCC)	12

== Certifications ==
Region	Certification	Certified units/sales
United Kingdom (BPI)	Silver	200,000^{‡}
^{‡} Sales+streaming figures based on certification alone.
