= The Tide (band) =

American rock band

- Origin: Los Angeles, California, United States
- Genres: Pop rock, pop
- Years active: 2015–2017
- Labels: Steady Records, Universal Music Group, EMI
- Past members: Austin Corini; Drew Dirksen; Levi Jones; Nate Parker

The Tide were a band from Los Angeles, California formed in 2015. They were signed to The Vamps' record label, Steady Records, under EMI Universal. They were the supporting act for The Vamps World Tour 2015, and again in 2016, along with other artists such as Before You Exit (USA leg), Luke Friend (UK leg), HomeTown (UK leg) and Union J (UK leg). They also supported The Vamps in 2017.

== Career ==
The band was formed when the Vamps announced a secret project in late December 2014 and held auditions for a US guitarist and drummer aged 18–20 to form a band. Drew and Nate were in a previous pop-punk band called "All the Above" until they were given the offer to move on. The Tide started on 25 February 2015, consisting of 4 members: Austin Corini (born 26 December 1995) – lead vocals, Drew Dirksen (born 30 September 1996) – lead guitar and backing vocals, Levi Jones (born 21 November 1997) – bass guitar and vocals and Nate Parker (born 26 September 1996) – drum and backing vocals. Like the Vamps, the band started uploading covers on YouTube and gained a number of fans since then.

On 18 February 2015, the Vamps announced that they would be taking them on tour. The Tide have so far played shows across Europe in various countries such as Spain, Italy, the United Kingdom, the Netherlands, and Ireland for The Vamps UK Arena Tour. The first show of the tour kicked off in Glasgow, Scotland and the last show was in Madrid, Spain on 24 March 2016. The Tide toured the United Kingdom August – September 2016, with support acts of New Hope Club (also signed to the Vamps' record label) and Josh Taylor.

The Tide released their debut single "Young Love" on 25 March 2016. A second single, "Click My Fingers" was released on 12 August 2016. Their first EP, Click My Fingers was released on 15 November 2016. Their third single "Put the Cuffs on Me" was released on 31 March 2017, supporting their headlining tour named 'Put the Cuffs on Me Tour'. Their fourth single "Naked" was released 8 September 2017, alongside digital pre-order for their debut album Young Love. Their album was released on 15 October 2017.

Members Drew Dirksen and Levi Jones created a YouTube channel called Drew and Levi to film their daily lives.

Drew Dirksen and Levi Jones were an EDM pop duo called O.D.L. and toured the United Kingdom in March 2018. They have since disbanded.

Dirksen joined a new group called ROYLS and signed a record deal with Big Noise.

== Discography ==
=== Extended plays ===
- 2016: Click My Fingers EP

=== Studio albums ===
- 2017: Young Love

=== Singles ===
| Title | Year | Album |
|---|---|---|
| "Young Love" | 2016 | Young Love |
| "Click My Fingers" | 2016 | Young Love |
| "Put the Cuffs on Me" | 2017 | Young Love |
| "Naked" | 2017 | Young Love |

== Music videos ==
| Year | Title | Director(s) |
|---|---|---|
| 2016 | "Young Love" | Fat Nonce |
| 2016 | "Click My Fingers" | Short Slack |
| 2017 | "Put the Cuffs on Me" | Mike Baldwin |
