= Nate Blasdell =

American songwriter

- Born: Nathan Charles Blasdell; September 26, 1994 (age 32); Asunción, Paraguay
- Genre: Experimental
- Occupation: Musician
- Instrument: Guitar
- Years active: 2011–present
- Labels: Victory Records, Warner Records

Nathan Charles Blasdell (born September 26, 1994) is a Paraguayan-American musician, songwriter, composer and performer. He is the former lead guitarist for the experimental band, I Set My Friends on Fire. He was previously a guitarist for the post-hardcore experimental rock band The Bunny the Bear from 2014 to 2015.

== Early career ==
=== Music career ===
Blasdell was 19 years old when he joined the experimental rock band, The Bunny the Bear, as a touring guitarist, and were signed by Victory Records.

Nate left The Bunny the Bear in 2015 to assist the revival of the experimental band, I Set My Friends on Fire. In 2016, Blasdell and the band signed with Tragic Hero Records, and went on tour in the United States, Russia, Europe, United Kingdom, Asia, and Australia. At the beginning of 2017, they announced they would no longer be a label for the company.

After a statement Blasdell posted in 2022, he was relieved of his duties in “ISMFOF” and pursued focuses on his personal project, Losers Club.

=== Songwriter career ===
Blasdell has written songs for artists, such as Big Time Rush, MKTO, and Demi Lovato. He was featured as a writer in the song "Somebody to You," which was an RIAA certified gold in the United States, and an ARIA certified platinum in Australia. Blasdell has also co-wrote songs "Air," and "You're In Or You're Out," with The All American Rejects lead vocalist Tyson Ritter, which would both later be featured on the NBC sitcom "Parenthood."

== Other projects ==
Blasdell has starting managing NASCAR drivers after befriending driver Landon Cassill, from the bands music. On April 6, 2021, he formed a NASCAR sports management agency with Antonio Williams, an NFL running back for the Buffalo Bills, and the father of NASCAR driver Joe Graf Jr. The agency currently represents drivers in all three of NASCAR's national series', with drivers including Joe Graf Jr., Chris Hacker, and Logan Misuraca. Chase Purdy would join the agency for the 2022 season.

== Personal life ==
Blasdell currently resides in Rochester, New York. He graduated from Brighton High School in his hometown, Rochester, New York, in 2012. He had attended the University of Michigan majoring in International Business.
