= Chris Lent =

American drummer (born 1988)

Background information
- Also known as: Big dawg
- Born: Christopher William Lent; March 15, 1988 (age 38)
- Genres: Post-hardcore, metalcore, experimental, electronicore
- Occupation: Musician
- Instruments: Drums, percussion, keyboards, guitar
- Years active: 2005–present
- Labels: Epitaph, Interscope, Suretone
- Formerly of: Dead Reckless

Chris Lent (born March 15, 1988) is an American drummer and keyboardist, currently a member of the post-hardcore band From First to Last, and formerly of the experimental metal band I Set My Friends on Fire.

== Musical career ==
=== By Far the Least/Dead Reckless (2005–2006) ===
By Far the Least became Dead Reckless, a southern rock band, that was produced by Matt Good and Travis Richter on several songs. Dead Reckless toured the Dead by Dawn 2 tour with From First to Last, He is Legend, Haste the Day, and Chiodos. The band disbanded in the spring of 2006 while on tour in Tennessee.

=== From First to Last (2006–2009) ===
Lent was the keyboard player for From First to Last. He is seen in the video for Worlds Away, and the live performance on Jimmy Kimmel for Two as One. Lent performed at Download Festival, Rock Am Ring, Pinkpop, Warped Tour, KISS headliner, among other tours and festivals with the band. He left the band in 2009 to focus on drumming, he was featured in the band self-titled album.

=== I Set My Friends on Fire/The Color of Violence/Robot Manikon (2009–2011) ===
Lent originally joined the duo I Set My Friends on Fire as only a touring drummer assisting Matt Mehana and former member Nabil Moo in 2009. However, the band decided to make him a permanent member soon thereafter. He made his debut with the band on the song "Four Years Foreplay", a compilation with comedy duo Smosh, but his first appearance on a track strictly with the band was a demo version of the group's song "Excite Dyke".

Chris was also touring with The Color of Violence Derek Bloom and Travis Richter side project whenever time permitted. Lent was one of two drummers alongside Daughters drummer Jon Syverson. After Nabil Moo left the group, he replaced him as the keyboardist and composer on the group's second album, Astral Rejection. He wrote the script and treatment for the video It Comes Naturally with his brother Nicholas Lent. The video was then directed by Nabil Moo with Nicholas Lent co-directing. This was followed by another successful run on Warped tour '11 and a co-headliner in Europe with A Skylit Drive, after which he left the band.

== Discography ==
with From First to Last

- From First to Last (2008)

with I Set My Friends on Fire

- Astral Rejection (Epitaph Records, 2011)
- Astral Rejection OG (2020)

== Videography ==
with From First to Last

- Worlds Away (June 2008)

with I Set My Friends on Fire*Astral Rejection (Epitaph Records, 2011)

- "Things That Rhyme With Orange" (June 2009)
- "Four Years Foreplay" (September 2009)
- "Astral Rejection" (June 2011)
- "It Comes Naturally" (July 2011)
