= Oh Cecilia (Breaking My Heart) =

Single by the Vamps featuring Shawn Mendes

from the album Meet the Vamps
- Released: 12 October 2014
- Genre: Pop
- Length: 3:16 (solo version); 3:14 (version with Shawn Mendes)
- Label: Mercury; Virgin EMI
- Songwriter(s): Paul Simon; Connor Ball; Tristan Evans; James McVey; Brad Simpson; Amund Bjørklund; Espen Lind; Chris Michaud
- Producer(s): Espionage; Andrew Williams

The Vamps singles chronology
"Somebody to You" (2014)	"Oh Cecilia (Breaking My Heart)" (2014)	"Wake Up" (2015)

Shawn Mendes singles chronology
"Life of the Party" (2014)	"Oh Cecilia (Breaking My Heart)" (2014)	"Something Big" (2014)

Music video
- "Oh Cecilia (Breaking My Heart)" on YouTube

"Oh Cecilia (Breaking My Heart)" is a 2014 single by British pop band the Vamps, with a chorus adapted from Simon & Garfunkel's 1970 hit "Cecilia". The song appeared on their debut studio album Meet the Vamps (2014), but a later version featuring vocals from Canadian singer Shawn Mendes was released on 12 October 2014 as the album's fifth single.

The song has charted in Australia, Ireland, New Zealand, Scotland, South Africa, and the United Kingdom (where it peaked at number 9, becoming the group's fifth successive top 10 single), whilst the version featuring Shawn Mendes charted in Ireland, New Zealand and South Africa.

== Background ==
"Oh Cecilia (Breaking My Heart)", which is a pop song, is an adaptation of Simon & Garfunkel's 1970 hit song "Cecilia", with interpolated sampling occurring throughout the song. The verse lyrics do not follow those of the original song, though they still heavily rely on the main chorus (Cecilia, you're breaking my heart / You're shaking my confidence daily / Oh Cecilia I'm down on my knees / I'm begging you please to come home).

== Music video ==
Two music videos exist for the song. One of them features the Vamps and Mendes shipwrecked in an area they don't initially realise is already inhabited, sending out an SOS and then bolting upon sight of a plane, and the other is in support of charity and features famous faces.

== Track listing ==
- Digital download
1. "Oh Cecilia (Breaking My Heart)" (featuring Shawn Mendes) – 3:14
2. "Hurricane" – 3:19
- Digital download
1. "Oh Cecilia (Breaking My Heart)" (The Basement Acoustic Mix) – 3:23
- CD edition
1. "Oh Cecilia (Breaking My Heart) (Live from the O2 Arena)" – 3:16
2. "Teenagers" – 2:40
3. "Dear Maria, Count Me In/Sugar We're Going Down (Medley)" – 2:53
4. "Girls On TV (Live from the O2 Arena)" – 3:40

== Charts ==
Chart (2014)	Peak position
Australia (ARIA)	46
Ireland (IRMA)	42
New Zealand (Recorded Music NZ)	13
Scotland (OCC)	3
South Africa (EMA)	4
UK Singles (OCC)	9

== Certifications ==
Region	Certification	Certified units/sales
New Zealand (RMNZ)	Gold	7,500^{*}
United Kingdom (BPI)	Gold	400,000^{‡}
^{*} Sales figures based on certification alone.^{‡} Sales+streaming figures based on certification alone.
