= Wild Heart (The Vamps song) =

Single by The Vamps

from the album Meet the Vamps
- Released: 19 January 2014
- Genre: Pop rock
- Length: 3:11
- Label: Mercury; Virgin EMI
- Songwriter(s): Amund Bjørklund; Espen Lind; Ben Harrison; Ibrahim "Ayb" Asma; Jamie Scott; James McVey; Connor Ball; Tristan Evans; Brad Simpson

The Vamps singles chronology
"Can We Dance" (2013)	"Wild Heart" (2014)	"Last Night" (2014)

Music video
- "Wild Heart" on YouTube

"Wild Heart" is a song by British pop rock band The Vamps. It was released in the United Kingdom on 19 January 2014 as the second single from their debut studio album Meet the Vamps (2014).

The single also includes a cover of McFly's 5 Colours in Her Hair.

== Background ==
"Wild Heart" was written by all four members of The Vamps along with Amund Bjørklund, Espen Lind, Ben Harrison, Ibrahim "Ayb" Asmar, and Jamie Scott. There are eight different versions of the track to purchase, including one featuring vocals from English singer Pixie Lott.

When asked about writing the song by MTV News, guitarist James McVey explained: "We really enjoyed making [their previous single] Can We Dance but with Wild Heart we kind of experimented more with musical genre in the sense that we added a banjo and mandolin. We like to try and push ourselves into directions to try new things really and we've gone for more of a folky vibe so we hope people like it. We like to think it's a feel good song I guess." Frontman Brad Simpson admitted that the song "influenced the rest of the album sound almost just because it was such a key song for us."

== Critical reception ==
Lewis Corner of Digital Spy gave the song a mixed review, stating: "Ironically, as their namesake suggests, the group intend to do so by repeating the current pop music rhythm. 'Tonight we'll dance/ I'll be yours and you'll be mine,' frontman Bradley croons over Mumford & Sons-lite guitars and beats; the kind that have been thrust firmly into the mainstream by 1D, Ed Sheeran and even Avicii in recent years. We don't blame them though as the formula has an undeniable success rate – and while 'Wild Heart' is far from pushing any kind of boundaries, you'll be hard pushed to get it out of your head anytime soon."

== Chart performance ==
On 23 November, the song debuted at number six on the Irish Singles Chart, making it their highest-charting single to date in this country. It then debuted at number three on the UK Singles Chart three days later, giving The Vamps their second consecutive UK top 3 hit.

== Music video ==
A "live video" was uploaded to YouTube on 22 July 2013. The official music video was directed by Dean Sherwood. It was uploaded to YouTube on 3 December 2013. As of March 31, 2021, it has more than 55 million views on YouTube.

== Formats and track listings ==
- Digital download
1. "Wild Heart" – 3:11
- Digital download - EP
1. "Wild Heart" (Nashville Mix) – 3:11
2. "Five Colours in Her Hair" – 2:57
3. "Twist & Shout" – 2:39
4. "Why'd You Only Call Me When You're High?" – 2:40
- Digital download - Remix EP
1. "Wild Heart" (Nashville Remix) – 3:11
2. "Wild Heart" (Tristan Animal Version) – 3:12
3. "Wild Heart" (James & Connor Version) – 3:11
4. "Wild Heart" (Digital Dog Remix) – 3:11
5. "Wild Heart" (featuring Pixie Lott) – 3:39
- Digital download - Live Single
1. "Wild Heart" (Live) – 3:23
- CD1
1. "Wild Heart" - 3:11
2. "You Said No"
3. "Best Song Ever"
4. "Are You Gonna Be My Girl"
- CD2
1. "Wild Heart" (James & Connor Version) - 3:11
2. "A Thousand Years"
- DVD
1. "Wild Heart" (music video)
2. "Carry on Vamping" (documentary)

== Charts ==
Weekly chart performance for "Wild Heart"
Chart (2014)	Peak position
Belgium (Ultratip Bubbling Under Flanders)	33
Ireland (IRMA)	6
Scotland (OCC)	3
UK Singles (OCC)	3

== Certifications ==
Certifications and sales for "Wild Heart"
Region	Certification	Certified units/sales
United Kingdom (BPI)	Gold	400,000^{‡}
^{‡} Sales+streaming figures based on certification alone.

== Release history ==
Country	Date	Format	Label	Ref.
Australia	19 January 2014	Digital download; EP	Virgin EMI	
Ireland	19 January 2014	Digital download; EP	Virgin EMI	
United Kingdom	19 January 2014	Digital download; EP	Virgin EMI	
