= Can We Dance =

Single by The Vamps

from the album Meet the Vamps
- Released: 29 September 2013
- Recorded: 2013
- Genre: Pop
- Length: 3:11
- Label: Mercury; Virgin EMI
- Songwriters: Timz Lam; Bruno Mars; Philip Lawrence; Amund Bjorklund; Espen Lind; Karl Michael
- Producers: Espionage; Bruno Mars

The Vamps singles chronology
"Can We Dance" (2013)	"Wild Heart" (2014)

Music video
- "Can We Dance" on YouTube

"Can We Dance" is the debut single by British pop band the Vamps. It was released in the United Kingdom on 29 September 2013 as the lead single from their debut studio album Meet the Vamps (2014). The song debuted and peaked at number two on the UK Singles Chart, being kept off the top spot by OneRepublic's "Counting Stars".

== Background ==
"Can We Dance" was written by Karl Michael, Bruno Mars, Philip Lawrence, Timz Lam and Espionage, and produced by Mars and Espionage.

== Music video ==
The official music video was uploaded to YouTube on 6 August 2013. It features The Vamps playing to a crowd of screaming fans in lead singer Bradley Simpson's garage. At the end of the video, his parents come home, having seen the action unfold on YouTube and show it to him. As of October 22, 2024, the video has over 96 million views.

== Chart performance ==
On 2 October 2013, it was reported that "Can We Dance" was leading the midweek UK charts and on course to debut at number one on the UK Singles Chart, 13,000 copies ahead of its nearest competitor, "Counting Stars" by OneRepublic, which had been climbing the chart for two months. Two days later, "Can We Dance" was still on course to reach the top, but "Counting Stars" was now just 6,000 copies behind. On 6 October, following a late surge by OneRepublic fans, "Counting Stars" was announced a number one, while "Can We Dance" was at number two, having sold 66,730 copies. In the closest chart battle of 2013 (at the time), there were just 1,150 copies separating the two songs. On 29 November, the song was certified Silver by the British Phonographic Industry for sales of over 200,000 copies.

In Ireland, "Can We Dance" debuted and peaked at number 21, spending just three weeks in the top 50. In Australia, the song entered the ARIA Charts at number 47, before eventually rising to its peak of number 17. It spent a total of 13 weeks in the Australian top 50. On 14 February 2014, it was announced that the song had been certified Platinum in Australia for sales of over 70,000. In New Zealand, "Can We Dance" debuted at number 35 and later rose to number 19, staying there for two weeks.

In 2015, the band performed the song as themselves in a season 4 episode of the Disney Channel series Jessie.

== Formats and track listings ==
- Digital download – EP
1. "Can We Dance" (Single version) – 3:11
2. "Year 3000" – 3:20
3. "MMMBop" – 4:01
4. "Teenage Kicks" (Live) – 1:54
- CD1
1. "Can We Dance" (Single version) – 3:11
2. "Mr. Brightside"
3. "22"
4. "Wild Heart" (Live)
- CD2 (James edition)
1. "Can We Dance" (James' version) – 3:40
2. "Little Things"
- CD3 (Connor edition)
1. "Can We Dance" (Connor's version) – 3:41
2. "Weightless"
- Digital download – Remix EP
1. "Can We Dance" (James' version) – 3:40
2. "Can We Dance" (Connor's version) – 3:41
3. "Can We Dance" (Tristan's version) – 3:38
4. "Can We Dance" (Brad's demo version) – 3:37
5. "Can We Dance" (Seamus Haji club mix) – 6:06

== Charts ==
=== Weekly charts ===
Chart (2013–14)	Peak position
Australia (ARIA)	17
Czech Republic Airplay (ČNS IFPI)	73
Ireland (IRMA)	21
New Zealand (Recorded Music NZ)	19
Poland Airplay (ZPAV)	10
Scotland Singles (Official Charts)	2
UK Singles (Official Charts)	2

=== Year-end charts ===
Chart (2013)	Position
UK Singles (OCC)	81
Chart (2014)	Position
Poland (Polish Airplay Top 100)	46

== Certifications ==
Region	Certification	Certified units/sales
Australia (ARIA)	Platinum	70,000^{^}
New Zealand (RMNZ)	Platinum	30,000^{‡}
United Kingdom (BPI)	Platinum	600,000^{‡}
^{^} Shipments figures based on certification alone.^{‡} Sales+streaming figures based on certification alone.

== Release history ==
Country	Date	Format	Label	Ref.
Australia	6 August 2013	Digital download	Mercury; Virgin EMI	
Ireland	6 August 2013	Digital download	Mercury; Virgin EMI	
United Kingdom	6 August 2013	Digital download	Mercury; Virgin EMI	
