= Command & Conquer (cancelled video game) =

- Developer: Victory Games
- Publisher: Electronic Arts
- Series: Command & Conquer
- Engine: Frostbite 3
- Platform: Microsoft Windows
- Release: Cancelled
- Genre: Real-time strategy
- Modes: Single-player, multiplayer

Command & Conquer (previously known as Command & Conquer: Generals 2) is a cancelled real-time strategy video game in the Command & Conquer series. It was being developed by the now-closed video game studio Victory Games for Microsoft Windows. The game was set to use the Frostbite 3 engine and would have introduced downloadable content to the series. It was supposed to be the first game in the series to be developed by Victory Games, making them the series' third developer after Westwood Studios and EA Los Angeles. Command & Conquer would have been available exclusively on Electronic Arts' Origin distribution service.

The game was originally announced as Command & Conquer: Generals 2, a direct sequel to 2003's Command & Conquer: Generals. It was then re-purposed in August 2012 as what would have been the first in a series of free-to-play games set in the Command & Conquer universe. The skirmish multiplayer platform was slated for release for free around Christmas 2013, with 'pay per play' campaign missions releasing by Q1 2014. On October 29, 2013, EA ceased development of Command & Conquer and shut down Victory Games, citing negative feedback over the economy-based experience as a reason. Shortly after the cancellation announcement, an unidentified Victory Games staff member posted on the official forums, in the area reserved for players with access to the alpha builds, and stated that the reason for the game's cancellation was "corporate shenanigans" and not negative reception. The staff member also claimed that the official cancellation announcement was pre-written by higher-level staff at Electronic Arts.

== Gameplay ==
Previously, Command & Conquer 4: Tiberian Twilight drastically changed the original game's formula in certain areas, such as the removal of base building and the addition of population caps (changes which were poorly received). Command & Conquer (2013) would have returned to its original roots. Along with classic staples such as base building and resource collection, there would have been the usual amounts of orchestrating and commanding large armies. The game would have also introduced oil and natural gas (or coal) as primary resources, as well as a "base proxy" tactic in which one faction must have "captured" a resource stash before letting its harvesters in.

=== Factions ===
The game would have featured three unique factions: European Union (EU), Global Liberation Army (GLA) and Asia-Pacific Alliance (APA). A downloadable campaign was planned to be released for each of them, excluding the tutorial, which would have been free. In mid-2013 the website also revealed information about the likely return of "hero units" from the first Generals game, including Jarmen Kell and Black Lotus.

== Synopsis ==
Command & Conquer is set in 2023, ten years after the events of Command & Conquer: Generals – Zero Hour. After the United States lost much of its global influence and adopted an isolationist policy, China became the dominant world power as it strengthened its military power and sought closer relations with the European Union. They would come together to form the Eurasian Unity League to replace the US-led NATO. However, the worsening of relations between China and the EU led to the fragmentation and eventual dissolution of the League.

China, along with multiple East Asian nations, then formed the Asia-Pacific Alliance, which soon became a global superpower. Meanwhile, the EU, determined not to be dictated to by any foreign power, unified the militaries of its member states and began rapidly expanding and militarising. Soon, the EU became the most technologically powerful faction in the world, replacing the declining United States.

The EU continued to rise as a superpower, further straining their relations with China. Furthermore, their expansionist agenda has led to nations becoming EU satellites and dictators having the backing of the EU, with the China-dominated APA becoming increasingly concerned by the EU's policies.

Meanwhile, a series of increasingly bloody uprisings have torn key APA and EU satellite nations asunder. Rumors point to a newly reconstituted Global Liberation Army as the instigator, but witnesses have described technology far beyond the reach of any normal terrorist organization. Concerned, the APA dispatches an elite force to infiltrate the latest, most volatile rebellion, one targeting an EU-backed dictator. Their mission - learn the truth about the new GLA, undermine the EU and restore peace to the globe.

== Development ==
=== As Generals 2 ===
After the release of Command & Conquer 4: Tiberian Twilight, much of the Command & Conquer team, within EA Los Angeles, was laid off in 2010 causing the future of the series to be cast in doubt. In October, a senior vice-president from Electronic Arts had told the media that the Command & Conquer series would live on as a brand from Dead Space developers, Visceral Games, with a title from the series to be released by that developer being "far-off" and whether or not he was referring to this game is not clear.

The first official announcement of a new Command & Conquer game in development came in February 2011, when Electronic Arts revealed the formation of a new studio known as Victory Games. In the studios' first Q&A session with the official Command & Conquer blog, it was openly stated that they were developing a new title in the Command & Conquer series with the future of the series being the studio's general focus. The new studio consisted of members from the previous EA Los Angeles development team as well as some new staff members. Its general manager was Jon Van Caneghem from Trion Worlds.

The title's formal announcement was then teased as a game from the "next big BioWare franchise" and was due for a revealing at the 2011 Spike Video Game Awards. The game was then speculated to be either a new entry from defunct studio Pandemic's Mercenaries series or a new game from the Command & Conquer series, which turned out to be an accurate analysis. Subsequently, more rumors began to indicate that the game was indeed a Command & Conquer game called Command & Conquer: Alliances due to a series of domain registrations by EA for a game of that name; though this turned out to be a side project by Phenomic, called Command & Conquer: Tiberium Alliances. The game was finally formally unveiled as Command & Conquer: Generals 2 on December 10 at the 2011 Spike Video Game Awards as a title developed by what would become BioWare Victory. However, in November 2012, the BioWare label was dropped and the studio was renamed to its former name Victory Games.

=== Change to free-to-play model ===
In August 2012, Generals 2 was repurposed to a free-to-play game known as simply Command & Conquer. The content which had been built for Generals 2 was to be delivered into the new C&C game.

Following the negative reaction from series fans that Command & Conquer would not have a single-player campaign, EA President Frank Gibeau said that a single-player storyline would still be a possibility: "The beauty of free-to-play is that we can adjust and adapt to what we're hearing as opposed to, 'I'm sorry, it's two months from ship and it is what it is'. It's a very different model because you don't have to build as much. You build in response to your audience". It was later revealed that the game would have a single-player campaign.

=== Promotion and cancellation ===
From then on, news of the upcoming game was relatively quiet. In mid-December 2012, Victory Games hosted a C&C Community Summit where select members were invited and given the chance to play the game and share feedback with the developers. It was later on that Victory Games announced the third faction as the Asian-Pacific Alliance. In May EA released a development video diary stating the developers' intention to constantly improve on the final product based on the players' feedback. At E3 2013, EA released a new trailer of the game as well as the beta going live in the summer. On August 5, a second development video diary was released showing the design process of modifying the GLA Bomb Truck unit from Command & Conquer: Generals into the GLA Nuke Truck. Victory Games also released wallpapers of the generals of each faction, starting with the APA generals and later the EU and GLA within a few days of each other.

Both EA and Victory Games stated that Command and Conquer would be showcased at Cologne's Gamescom 2013. In addition to the press conference, a trailer revealed that campaign missions were to be made available next year. The game has been canceled as of October 29, 2013 due to negative fan feedback over an economy-based, multiplayer experience. The cancellation statement released by the company cited multiplayer for Command & Conquer being its downfall.

=== Potential reinstation ===
In November 2013, EA said the game will still be developed by a new game studio, and customers who bought the Command & Conquer Ultimate Collection will still receive an invite to the beta. In 2014, EA was looking for a new developer of the reboot. No information relating to the game has since been released.
