= Command & Conquer: Red Alert (2009 video game) =

- Logo of Command & Conquer: Red Alert
- Developer: EA Mobile
- Publisher: EA Mobile
- Series: Command & Conquer: Red Alert
- Platform: iOS
- Release: November 1, 2009
- Genre: Real-time strategy
- Modes: Single-player, multiplayer

Command & Conquer: Red Alert is a 2.5D real-time strategy video game developed and published by Electronic Arts for iOS. It was released in October 2009 in the App Store.

The game contains two playable factions, Soviets and Allies, which both previously appeared in Command & Conquer: Red Alert and Command & Conquer: Red Alert 2 with a third playable faction, the Empire of the Rising Sun from Command & Conquer: Red Alert 3, available as an in-app purchase.

== Gameplay ==
Red Soviet forces attacking and bombing a blue Soviet Base

Red Alert retains the core real-time strategy mechanics of the Command & Conquer series. Opposing factions harvest resources from ore fields using refineries and then use those resources to construct military bases and forces on-site. The gathering mechanic is streamlined so there are no collector units, only refineries that provide a steady cash flow. Structures form a shallow but wide tech tree with a variety of units and buildings. Units and buildings are selected and moved by tapping on them and on various areas on the battlefield. The camera moves around the battle field by dragging and scrolling on the touchscreen and zooms in and out by pinching the screen.

Players have the choice to choose between two factions, the Soviet Union and the Allies, each faction has its own unique set of units and buildings. Units in the game come from various past and present Red Alert games such as the War Bears and Apollo Fighters from Red Alert 3 as well as Prism Tanks and Apocalypse Tanks from Red Alert 2, the game also comes with its own range of new units which were not present in other Red Alert games. Most buildings retain their designs from Red Alert 2 with the exceptions of certain buildings such as the Allied Tech Lab which uses its Red Alert 3 design while others have completely new designs.

The game has a total of 12 different playable maps in the skirmish mode of the game.

== Plot ==
The game takes place shortly after Red Alert 2: Yuri's Revenge and before the Soviets' defeat at the beginning of Red Alert 3. Thus the second time-travel that took place during Red Alert 3 has not taken place yet, hence the presence of technologies such as Prism Tanks and Towers which were removed in Red Alert 3.

The events in the game lead to the Soviets acquiring time travel technology.

== Development ==
The game was announced for iOS at the Electronic Entertainment Expo 2009 with a playable demo showcasing the game at the Electronic Arts booth. Further details were revealed in September as well as a flurry of new screenshots showcasing the game. EA has also announced to release an additional multiplayer update for the game at launch so as to enable the multiplayer function in the game to allow players to play with each other over Wi-Fi and Bluetooth. EA wanted to release an expansion pack for the game in 2010, to include a new faction, the Empire of the Rising Sun, as well as new units for both the Soviets and the Allies. In August 2015, EA removed the game from the App Store, because it did not update the game to the latest iOS.

== Reception ==
Reception

Aggregate scores
Aggregator	Score
GameRankings	73%
Metacritic	72/100 iPad: 64/100

Review score
Publication	Score
TouchArcade	3.5/5

Command & Conquer: Red Alert received "mixed or average reviews" from critics upon release, according to review aggregation website Metacritic. The iPhone version holds a Metacritic score of 72 out of 100, while the iPad version received a lower score of 64, reflecting a more critical response to its upscaled presentation.

Critics generally praised the game for successfully adapting the Command & Conquer real-time strategy formula to touchscreen controls. Slide to Play described it as playing better than other real-time strategy games on iOS, though noting a lack of game modes. TouchArcade similarly praised the touchscreen interface, highlighting the intuitive controls, effective use of multitouch gestures, and overall usability for the genre on mobile devices. IGN highlighted the streamlined resource management as making the game more approachable on mobile devices, but criticized the limited content and the absence of multiplayer functionality at launch.

Despite positive remarks on controls and presentation, several reviewers criticized the game for its limited amount of content. TouchArcade noted that the included campaigns were brief and functioned more as tutorials, with only a small selection of skirmish maps available without additional downloadable content, which reduced replay value.

Reviews were more critical of the iPad version, with several outlets citing technical limitations and a lack of optimization for the larger screen. Eurogamer and NZGamer both remarked that the upscaled visuals and performance issues detracted from the experience, while IGN described the release as a rushed port that failed to take full advantage of the platform.
