= Command & Conquer: Renegade =

2002 video game

- Developer: Westwood Studios
- Publisher: EA Games
- Director: Colin McLaughlin
- Producers: Mike Ward; Joseph Selinske (Associate Producer)
- Designers: Gregory Fulton; David Yee
- Programmers: Byron Garrabrant; Greg Hjelstrom
- Artists: Elie Arabian; Joseph Black; Eric Kearns
- Writers: Jason Henderson; Paul Robinson
- Composer: Frank Klepacki
- Series: Command & Conquer
- Engine: W3D (Westwood 3D) engine
- Platform: Microsoft Windows
- Release: NA: February 26, 2002; EU: March 1, 2002
- Genres: First-person shooter, third-person shooter
- Modes: Single-player, multiplayer

Command & Conquer: Renegade is a first- and third-person shooter video game developed by Westwood Studios and is part of the Command & Conquer series. It is the only Command & Conquer game that uses the first-person view and was the last installment in the series to be produced under Westwood Studios banner. It was released on February 26, 2002 by EA Games. The game received generally favorable reviews from critics.

== Synopsis ==
Renegade's story takes place during the final days of the First Tiberium War originally depicted in Command & Conquer. GDI's top three Tiberium research specialists have been abducted by the Brotherhood of Nod. The player assumes the role of GDI commando Captain Nick "Havoc" Parker, who is assigned to rescue these experts. He conducts missions which take him all over the world in various countries and climates, both indoor and outdoor, and his actions greatly affect the current state of the war. As the game progresses it is revealed that the specialists have been forced into biochemistry research for the Brotherhood's top secret "Project Re-Genesis", an attempt to create genetically enhanced super-soldiers with the aid of Tiberium.

== Gameplay ==
The game can be played as either a first-person or third-person shooter to the player's preference. The player wields multiple weapons, some of which have unique effectiveness on certain enemies, and has the ability to plant C4 charges on targets and set up beacons to launch an ion cannon beam. Weapons have both re-loadable magazines and extra ammo capacities. There are no melee weapons in the game, only a pistol with infinite ammo. The player is also able to drive and use the weapons of both GDI and Nod vehicles. Armour can be picked up to protect the player from damage.

As the player plays through a mission, the in-game EVA, or Electronic Video Assistant, periodically updates with mission objectives. EVA logs and updates all objectives and their current status. Objectives consist of destruction of structures, locating bases and such like. Objectives are organized into three categories: primary, secondary and tertiary. The completion of primary objectives are crucial for that mission's success. Secondary objectives are not required for mission completion and may not assist much in game play, but will affect the final "rank" at the end of each mission. Tertiary objectives, which are usually hidden, do not affect the final ranking at all, but may assist in game play (e.g. disabling an Obelisk of Light). Data Discs can be collected to update the mission map.

=== Multiplayer ===
The multiplayer element of this game takes the form of 'Command and Conquer Mode', in which players are divided into the two teams: GDI and Nod. Each team starts with its own base; team members can independently purchase vehicles and advanced character classes to destroy the enemy base and defend their own base. A match is won when one team destroys the other's base or when one team has more points than the other when the time limit expires. Damaging and destroying enemy units and structures earns points. Some servers allow the 'endgame beacon' option that causes a side to immediately win if that side's 'superweapon' beacon is successfully planted and detonated on a 'beacon pedestal' in the other side's base. team members receive money from Tiberium harvesting and must purchase their own individual equipment.

== Development ==
The game engine, called the "Renegade engine" or "Westwood 3D", was developed in-house by Westwood. It is designed to support real world physics and allow seamless movement from indoor to outdoor environments. The "Westwood 3D" engine was re-used as the base of the SAGE video game engine used in Command & Conquer: Generals, The Lord of the Rings: The Battle for Middle-earth, The Lord of the Rings: The Battle for Middle-earth II, and Command & Conquer 3: Tiberium Wars.

When the game missed its shipping date, Westwood made a comedic video titled Havoc Takes on Westwood, in which Havoc, the game's main character and hero, goes to Westwood Studios to make sure the game does not miss its shipping date again. Even after the video was made, the shipping date was missed once again.

In early released promotional screenshots, Nod troopers looked more like their Command & Conquer equivalent, donning professional urban camouflage uniforms rather than red jumpsuits easily distinguishable on the battlefield.

Renegade was re-released in at least two EA Classics boxes (one including Comanche 4 as a bonus, and the other including Freedom Force) sometime after its initial release and was included in two Command & Conquer compilations: The Command & Conquer Collection, and Command & Conquer Collected.

In February 2006, Renegade was shipped in the compilation, Command & Conquer: The First Decade along with 11 other Command & Conquer titles on a two DVD set. The bonus DVD contains slightly less than an hour's worth of content involving all the games included. The game DVD of Command & Conquer: The First Decade, Renegade included its latest patch (1.037) by default, has a sanctioned No-CD application on it, plus the CD components such as the movie files are now installed into its folder. Renegade, along with a few other titles had problems with its registry entry in the compilation's initial release, which has been since fixed in the 1.02 patch. While Westwood originally intended to make a sequel to Renegade set in the late Red Alert universe (known only as Renegade 2), the project was canceled before any official announcements were made. Concept art depicting Red Alert styled structures and vehicles can be found online, as well as a test level depicting a Soviet refinery. Active fan projects received permission from EA to release in a stand-alone fashion. This event marks a notable shift in public relations strategy for Electronic Arts, which has often been portrayed in a negative light in terms of community support and has never made such a gesture regarding its intellectual property before.

Renegade is the only game aside from Sole Survivor, Tiberian Twilight, Tiberium Alliances, and Rivals in the series for which official expansion packs were never released. However, a software development kit (SDK) was released by Westwood Studios so that users could add their own content to the game. The studio also released a number of high-resolution models to the mod-making community, including some from the Red Alert games, particularly the second. Many fan sites have been established to celebrate the game and allow players to download new maps and custom expansion packs.

In July 2006, EA Games released a software development kit (SDK) that catered for 3DS Max software for Command & Conquer: Generals and The Lord of the Rings: The Battle for Middle-Earth games. Although Renegade used the same basic game engine as these other two games series, it was not made compatible to this new SDK. Members from the Red Alert: A Path Beyond community modified and re-released it to be compatible with Renegade after informing EA. An updated version was officially released following this.

A PlayStation 2 version was in development, but was cancelled.

== Reception ==
Reception

Aggregate scores
Aggregator	Score
GameRankings	75%
Metacritic	75/100

Review scores
Publication	Score
AllGame	3/5
Computer Gaming World	3.5/5
Edge	5/10
Eurogamer	4/10
Game Informer	8.25/10
GamePro	4.5/5
GameRevolution	C+
GameSpot	7.8/10
GameSpy	3/5
GameZone	7.7/10
IGN	7.4/10
PC Gamer (US)	79%

In the United States, Renegade sold 250,000 copies and earned $7.8 million by August 2006, after its release in February 2002. It was the country's 79th best-selling computer game between January 2000 and August 2006. Command & Conquer: Renegade received "generally favorable reviews" according to the review aggregation website Metacritic.

Greg Kasavin of GameSpot said that "the game does have some noticeable problems, though C&C fans may find themselves having too much fun to care", but he also criticizes the game, stating that "Westwood has never made a shooter before, and you can tell". The publication later named Renegade a runner-up for its February 2002 "Game of the Month" award. IGN's Steve Butts commented on the game's repetitiveness, writing: "I guess I wanted something a lot less scripted and a lot less cramped from the single player game...As it is, it's a lot like running through a hall until you get to a building, clearing the building and then running through a hallway until you get to the next building". Furthermore, he criticizes the AI, saying: "More than just about anything else it's the dreadful AI that ruins the potential enjoyment of the game. Enemies possess very little sophistication and their main tactic seems to consist of running right towards you trying to empty their ammo clips as fast as possible".

Renegade was praised for its online play. The Gamers' Temple wrote that "[...]Westwood continues their tradition of excellent multiplayer support with Renegade". During the 6th Annual Interactive Achievement Awards, the Academy of Interactive Arts & Sciences nominated Renegade for "Online Gameplay of the Year".

== Legacy ==
Renegade X is a standalone game created by an independent volunteer development studio, Totem Arts. The studio released the open beta, freeware version of the game on February 26, 2014. Totem Arts continues to release updates and additions for Renegade X.

EA open-sourced the game in February 2025.
