= Command & Conquer: Red Alert 3 – Uprising =

2009 video game

- Developer: EA Los Angeles
- Publisher: Electronic Arts
- Producer: Amer Ajami
- Designer: Jasen Torres
- Programmer: Austin Ellis
- Artists: Matt J. Britton; Mike Colonnese; Michael Laygo
- Writer: Mical Pedriana
- Composers: James Hannigan; Frank Klepacki; Timothy Michael Wynn
- Series: Command & Conquer: Red Alert
- Engine: SAGE 2.0
- Platforms: Uprising; Microsoft Windows; Commander's Challenge; PlayStation 3, Xbox 360
- Release: Uprising: WW: March 12, 2009; Commander's Challenge: WW: September 24, 2009
- Genre: Real-time strategy
- Mode: Single-player

Command & Conquer: Red Alert 3 – Uprising is a 2009 real-time strategy video game developed by EA Los Angeles and published by Electronic Arts. It is a stand-alone expansion to Command & Conquer: Red Alert 3 released for Microsoft Windows and offered via digital distribution. It features about 30 new maps for traditional skirmish with many of these taking place in new environments. It does not contain any multiplayer elements such as cooperative play, online play or network play.

A part of Uprising called Commander's Challenge was also released as Command & Conquer: Red Alert 3 – Commander's Challenge for the PlayStation 3 and Xbox 360 on September 24, 2009. Additionally, Commander's Challenge can be purchased from the Xbox digital store and played on Xbox One and Xbox Series consoles through the Xbox backwards compatibility program. It functions as a stand-alone game and does not require Red Alert 3 to play. Commander's Challenge contains only the Commander's Challenge mode of Uprising and the new units and weapons, but not the campaign or skirmish modes.

== Campaigns ==
Uprising picks up on where the Allied Campaign of the original game left off. Four "mini-campaigns" are available, one for each faction in Red Alert 3 and a bonus one centered around the origins of the Empire's commando Yuriko Omega. Each of the campaigns is three missions long, with the exception of the Soviet one, which consists of four. Initially only the Soviet and Yuriko campaigns are available, the campaigns for the Allies and the Empire of the Rising Sun becoming available after finishing the first mission in the Soviet campaign.

== Plot ==
All three campaigns assume that the Allied faction was victorious at the end of Red Alert 3. Both the Soviet Union and Imperial Japan have surrendered.

The Soviet campaign focuses on the remaining Soviet resistance trying to stop FutureTech, an Allied defense contractor which plans to create a super weapon called the "Sigma Harmonizer", a device to selectively stop time. FutureTech is revealed to have been helped by European Union President Rupert Thornley. Thornley plans to remove the Soviet Union from the timeline.

The Allied campaign concentrates on defeating several Imperial commanders who still resist Allied occupation. Emperor Tatsu has seemingly begun to cooperate with the Allies, but reveals his true intentions after his military authority is restored by the fall of Takara, the last commander in the Allied campaign.

The Empire's campaign covers the fight against two Soviet generals whose attempts to conquer parts of Japan is ignored by the Allied governor. The Allied forces finally decide to intervene in the last mission by attacking both belligerents.

The Yuriko campaign recounts the story of Yuriko Omega, her origins and discovery by the Imperial military, her captivity by the Allies and her fight to rescue her sister. Unlike the other campaigns, this campaign resembles an action role-playing game instead of a real-time strategy. The camera is always locked on Yuriko and the sidebar, minimap and threat meter are replaced with a compact command bar dedicated to Yuriko and her abilities.

== Additional features ==
Uprising features an expanded roster of live-action cast members, continuing the series' signature use of full motion video (FMV) cutscenes. Returning actors include Gemma Atkinson and Ivana Miličević, alongside new additions such as Malcolm McDowell, Ric Flair, Jamie Chung, Holly Valance, and Julia Ling.

The game introduces 11 new units, along with additional structures and specialized units that are exclusive to the campaign and Commander's Challenge modes, including units such as the Chief Scientist and Ursa Major. It also adds around 30 new skirmish maps.

== Commander's Challenge ==
Uprising also features a mode called Commander's Challenge in which players can play against AI commanders with various skill levels. This mode was also released as a stand-alone downloadable game for PlayStation 3 and Xbox 360.

Commander's Challenge contains 50 different, successively tougher scenarios. This is loosely based on Generals' Challenge from Command & Conquer: Generals – Zero Hour. It features some returning commanders from Red Alert 3 as well as some new ones. It contains some campaign-only units that appeared in the original Red Alert 3 such as the Tesla Tank and the Shogun Executioner. Certain maps in the Commander's Challenge also have special effects such as garbage raining from the sky or units produced on the map being shrunk. Before completing any missions, the player has access to only the basic units of each side, but upon completing each mission, more units are unlocked from the tech tree of that challenge's opponents.

Some missions have other standards, such as Blood Feud, in which Commanders Shinzo and Kenji will fight each other until the player attacks either. Also, in Commander's Challenge, the player can choose as which faction to play per mission, rather than playing the entire game as one faction. There are 13 main challenges and a further 37 side challenges which are unlocked when working through the game.

== Reception ==
Reception

Aggregate score
Aggregator	Score
Metacritic	N/A

Review scores
Publication	Score
IGN	7.5/10
Eurogamer	6/10
GameWatcher	7.0/10
Gaming Nexus	7.5/10

Command & Conquer: Red Alert 3 – Uprising received mixed to generally positive reviews from critics. Reviewers praised its variety of missions, unique units, and substantial single-player content, particularly the Commander's Challenge mode. However, criticism was directed at its lack of multiplayer features, dated gameplay mechanics, and limited innovation compared to previous entries in the series.
