= Command & Conquer: Sole Survivor =

1997 video game

- Developer: Westwood Studios
- Series: Command & Conquer
- Platform: Microsoft Windows
- Release: 8 December 1997
- Genre: Real-time strategy
- Mode: Multiplayer

Command & Conquer: Sole Survivor was a 1997 video game developed and published by Westwood Studios for Microsoft Windows. It was a spin-off title with multiplayer capabilities based on the 1995 game Command & Conquer. Sole Survivor received mixed reviews upon release.

== Gameplay ==
Screenshot

Sole Survivor was played online-only in multiplayer with up to 50 players. Matches featured different gameplay modes, including a deathmatch where players were required to remain the last man standing or to have acquired the most points at the end of the time limit, and a capture the flag mode. Each player controlled one unit across several types including minigunners, recon bikes, and tanks. Players controlled the game using point and click controls to navigate across the terrain, attack enemies, and collect power-ups contained in crates across the map.

== Development and release ==
Development of Sole Survivor was led by Bill Randolph of Westwood Studios, a lead programmer of Command & Conquer and its sequel Red Alert. Units and maps were substantially based on the original game. The developers described the intended multiplayer design as "anarchy", aiming to move away from the deathmatch model by having a large number of players without a set structure of play.

== Reception ==
Reception

Review scores
Publication	Score
Computer Games Strategy Plus	3/5
Computer Gaming World	3.5/5
GameSpot	6.3/10
Next Generation	1/5
PC Games (US)	D

Describing Sole Survivor retrospectively as a "largely forgotten" title and the "blackest sheep" of the series, Retro Gamer wrote retrospectively that the game "plays very sluggishly and is simply quite boring". New Age Gaming described the game as "way ahead of its time" despite having "inferior" graphics to its predecessor.
