= Command & Conquer 4: Tiberian Twilight =

2010 video game

- Developer: EA Los Angeles
- Publisher: Electronic Arts
- Designers: Samuel Bass; Jeremy Feasel; Jason Bender
- Programmer: Ryan C. Jones
- Artists: Chris Tamburrino; Umberto Bossi
- Writer: Mical Pedriana
- Composers: Jason Graves; James Hannigan; Timothy Michael Wynn
- Series: Command & Conquer
- Engine: SAGE 2.0
- Platform: Microsoft Windows
- Release: NA: March 16, 2010; AU: March 18, 2010; EU: March 19, 2010
- Genre: Real-time strategy
- Modes: Single-player, multiplayer

Command & Conquer 4: Tiberian Twilight is a real-time strategy video game, part of the Command & Conquer franchise, released on March 16, 2010. It constitutes a final chapter in the Tiberium saga. The game was originally intended to be an Asian market online-only version of Command & Conquer 3. It was released for download via online gaming distribution service Steam on March 19, 2010. Command & Conquer 4 also uses EA's own servers for online play, rather than GameSpy Servers which EA has relied on for previous Command & Conquer games. A closed beta of the game was released by EA to contest winners on November 21, 2009. The game received mixed reviews from critics.

== Gameplay ==
A battle between GDI (gold & blue) and Nod (red & black) forces

The gameplay in Command & Conquer 4 no longer follows the same resource-gathering dynamic as previous games in the series. In the main game mode, the player must capture control nodes scattered across a map, and retain more nodes than the enemy player, gaining enough points over time to win the match. Command & Conquer 4 utilizes class-based gameplay as well as some role-playing game elements.

There are two playable factions: the Global Defense Initiative (GDI) and the Brotherhood of Nod. The storyline begins with the world being consumed by the rampant growth of Tiberium, which is threatening to render the earth uninhabitable. Each faction is split into three upgradeable classes: offense, defense and support, each with their own specialized focus. The classes consist mostly of their own unique units, with the only shared unit among classes being the engineer. The offense class is focused on tank-based, front-line combat, relying less on any kind of fortified emplacements or bases. The defense class is focused on infantry-based combat as well as utilization of rudimentary base defenses, and are also the only class to have access to superweapons. It is the only class that allows the player to construct buildings in order to develop their base (analogous with the previous games). The support class is focused on air combat and specialized vehicles to traverse the environment, and is also equipped with special support powers that are used to assist teammates. As it relies on air support, the support MCVs of both factions are able to lift off in the air. Command & Conquer 4 contains two non-playable factions from previous games in the Tiberium Universe: The Scrin (C&C3) and the Forgotten (Tiberian Sun), the latter returning as a minor part of the story as well as a neutral class on the map. Command & Conquer 4 includes a total of about 90 units, including many new units and updated versions of previous Command & Conquer units.

In Command and Conquer 4: Tiberian Twilight, each faction features its own campaign with the story told and played out from their perspective, each resulting in an ultimate conclusion to the Kane saga. In addition to the two brief single player campaigns, Tiberian Twilight features a cooperative campaign mode, which will allow multi-class play and integrated player progression. The difficulty in co-op campaign mode varies depending on the player's level, and objectives will be shared. Campaigns for both factions take place simultaneously.

== Plot ==
The prologue takes place in the year 2062, 15 years after the Third Tiberium War (which led to the invasion and defeat of the Scrin), and 10 years after the end of Kane's Wrath. Tiberium has evolved and is spreading at such a rate that the whole planet is expected to become uninhabitable by 2068. Humanity is on the brink of extinction. Therefore, Kane, the leader of the Brotherhood of Nod, enters negotiations with the Global Defense Initiative (GDI), in hopes of using the Tacitus and GDI's resources to construct a worldwide Tiberium Control Network. This network will allow the spread of Tiberium to be controlled and turn Tiberium into an inexpensive power source. Even though the idea of alliance has been met with hostility (which has sparked the brief Incursion War), the two factions have nevertheless united.

The campaign starts 15 years after the formation of the alliance, as the Tiberium Control Network nears completion. The spread of Tiberium is stopped, bringing optimism to the world's population. However, extremists from both factions start to cause unrest, which sparks the Fourth Tiberium War. The radical Gideon, who leads the Nod separatists, secretly strikes an alliance with Colonel Louise James, a GDI extremist. The game's missions chronicle Kane's attempt to activate the Threshold 19, a tower constructed by Scrin aliens during the Third Tiberium War that functions as an interstellar portal. He intends to activate the tower using the Tiberium Control Network. The separatists factions, and later GDI, who are skeptical of Kane's motives, intend to stop him.

The player takes the role of Commander Parker, who can side with either James or Kane. Regardless of this choice, in both campaigns, Parker enters Threshold 19 in the aftermath of a final battle, and activates the tower on Kane's behest, only to be shot by James. Kane kills James and enters the portal. In the ending cut-scene, news channels announce that the Tiberium growth has receded following the complete activation of the Tiberium Control Network, and all the Nod followers have entered the Scrin tower and disappeared.

== Development ==
Tiberian Twilight is the sequel to Tiberium Wars and had been developed at EA Los Angeles for Windows, Linux, Mac OS and PlayStation 3 platforms. It had been widely rumored to be in development after a series of surveys was sent out by Electronic Arts to fans asking about what they would like in Tiberian Twilight.

Raj Joshi announced in a BattleCast Primetime special report that the game has been in development for several months and he is one of the producers of the game with Samuel Bass being the Campaign Producer. Official Command & Conquer Community Manager, Aaron "APOC" Kaufman, later clarified that the game had been well into development for over a year. Blindlight handled the story and scriptwriting for Tiberian Twilight, as well as some casting.

Tiberian Twilight was first announced by EA UK's PR team via Twitter on July 8, 2009. The official announcement came the day after together with a Q&A on GameSpot which provided key details about the game. Electronic Arts held a contest in which they wanted fans to submit their propositions for a subtitle for the game. The winning subtitle was revealed at CommandCom, a private event held at GamesCom on August 21.

Tiberian Twilight was actually originally intended to be an online game for the Asian pro-gaming market. The game was later forced to become the conclusion of the Command & Conquer: Tiberian series in an effort to boost sales. It was the first game in the series to implement a form of digital rights management (DRM) that requires constant Internet access; this type of DRM is controversial in that it can be used to target the used games market as well as ensuring that households must buy a copy per person.

Tiberian Twilight and Renegade are the only Command & Conquer games not to have an expansion pack. An exclusive prequel mission called "Night Moves" was available for those who pre-ordered the game, and later as a free bonus for all users.

== Reception ==
Reception

Aggregate score
Aggregator	Score
Metacritic	64/100

Review scores
Publication	Score
1Up.com	C−
Eurogamer	6/10
Game Informer	7.5/10
GamePro	4/5
GameSpot	7/10
GameSpy	2.5/5
GamesRadar+	7/10
IGN	7.4/10
The Guardian	3/5

Tiberian Twilight received mixed reviews amongst customers and critics, with lower review scores than any of its predecessors or the wider Command & Conquer franchise. The game's single-player campaign, live action video sequences, aggressive digital rights management software, progression system and multi-player mechanisms were the subject of most negative reviews. The game also suffered from prolonged multiplayer connectivity issues, which often led to lost rewards and progression.

Tom Chick of 1UP.com criticized the game for requiring users to complete several hours of single-player gameplay in order to use advanced units and features in multiplayer matches.

Adam Biessener of Game Informer, on the other hand, criticized the single-player portion as a poor gameplay experience due to fundamental flaws in the design, and suggested players should not play the single-player campaign as a "single player" in his review "Play This With A Friend, Or Not At All". Other major publications, including GameSpot and Eurogamer, shared similar concerns. Mike Anderiesz of the Guardian criticized the singleplayer aspect, saying that "[it feels] like a rushed and poorly play-tested version of Warhammer's Dawn of War series.".

IGN provided a 7.4/10 rating with reservation, stating while it is great to see developers and publishers taking risks, EA rewrote the entire gameplay formula instead of improving it, making for an experience that barely resembles traditional real-time strategy games, or any previous Command & Conquer titles.

GamePro, giving the game four stars out of five, stated that the mobile bases concept works well, online multiplayer is consistently stable, persistent progression is available, but criticized the need for constant Internet connection and the "leveling" mechanic that can lead to unbalanced multiplayer matches, which is critical in real-time strategy games.

GamesRadar gave it a seven out of ten, but stated that C&C4 is a graphical step back and as a single-player experience, it is "a bust".
