= Command & Conquer: Generals =

2003 video game

- Command & Conquer Generals cover art
- Developers: EA Pacific i5works(OS X)
- Publishers: EA Games (Windows); Aspyr Media (Mac OS X)
- Designer: Dustin Browder
- Programmer: Jeffrey Lee Brown
- Artists: Richard Kriegler (Art Director); Phil Robb; TJ Frame
- Writers: Danny Bilson; Paul DeMeo
- Composers: Bill Brown; Mikael Sandgren
- Series: Command & Conquer
- Engine: SAGE
- Platforms: Microsoft Windows; Mac OS X
- Release: Microsoft Windows: NA: February 11, 2003; EU: February 14, 2003; Mac OS X: NA: April 12, 2004
- Genre: Real-time strategy
- Modes: Single-player, multiplayer

Command & Conquer: Generals is a real-time strategy video game and the seventh installment in the Command & Conquer series. It was released for Microsoft Windows and Mac OS X in 2003 and 2004. The Windows version of Generals was developed by EA Pacific and published by EA Games, the Mac OS X version was developed by i5works and published by Aspyr Media. The Mac OS X version was released by Aspyr on April 12, 2004. In the game, the player can choose from three different factions: the United States, China and the Global Liberation Army (GLA).

Generals utilizes SAGE, an extended version of Command & Conquer: Renegade's 3D engine. An expansion pack, entitled Command & Conquer: Generals – Zero Hour, was additionally released for PC in 2003, and for Mac OS in 2004. Both Generals and Zero Hour were met with highly positive reviews. A sequel, Command & Conquer: Generals 2, was in development, until it was repurposed as a free-to-play game known as Command & Conquer. The new game was part of the Generals franchise and was cancelled on October 29, 2013, by EA after negative feedback during the closed alpha test.

== Gameplay ==
Command & Conquer Generals operates in a similar manner to that of other titles in the series - players construct bases and train units from these, acquiring resources on one of the game's maps to fund this, and then defeat their opponents by eliminating their bases and armies. Various units types are available for training, ranging from infantry to ground vehicles and aircraft, each focuses on specific roles (e.g. anti-vehicle), while base structures are divided between unit production, support facilities, and defensive counter-measures. Success in the game relies upon making the most out of mixing units, utilizing their advantages while countering their disadvantages with other units, in order to win against opponents - for example, rifle infantry are useful for countering anti-vehicle infantry, but need to rely on tanks to counter anti-infantry vehicles. Units that survive and manage to kill other units gain "veterancy" points, earning chevrons when they level up, effectively improve their abilities and making them more powerful; at the highest level, it also grants the ability to repair any damage when out of combat.

Training can be queued at production structures and units sent to rally points designated by the player, with the ability to research upgrades to improve certain units. In addition, players can also deploy superweapons which can decimate an opponent's forces, though must wait for a cooldown period to end before they can use it again. Factions in the game function similar in how they operate, but maintain differences in units and strategies:

- The United States rely on high-tech weaponry, such as military drones, lasers, and a dominant air force to deal with opponents, and are able to use supply units to airdrop infantry into occupied buildings, alongside flash grenades, to clear them out. In addition, they can improve power plants, their defensive structures link together to deal with enemy units, and they collect more supplies than the other two factions, but units are more expensive to produce.
- China relies on stronger tank and artillery units, and can use hackers to claim buildings or produce additional funds by stealing money from bank account online. In addition, their troop transports can detect stealth units, while their tanks and infantry can incur horde bonuses when grouped together. However, their power plants can cause damage to surrounding units and buildings when destroyed, they maintain a weaker air force, and require large armies to make horde bonuses work effectively.
- The Global Liberation Army rely on cheap units and terrorist-styled guerrilla warfare to overcome opponents, in which several vehicle units can be upgraded by salvaging parts from defeated enemy vehicles (infantry can also claim this for funds), using specialized infantry units to create ambushes and considerable damage. In addition, they do not require power for base structures, and any buildings that are destroyed will be automatically rebuilt if the enemy fails to destroy a tunnel entrance that is left behind. However, they must use builder units to collect supplies, with several needed to ensure funds are steady, and cannot build air units; this is compensated by having more anti-air units than the other two factions.

Generals functions differently to other titles in the series, in that base construction relies on dedicated builder units rather than a central construction building, but with the added ability of being able to construct buildings anywhere on the map. Resources are restricted to supply docks that have a limited amount for collection, with each faction able to construct units or buildings that provide continual resources as long as they are not destroyed. In addition, players can also make use of "Generals Powers" - a unique set of bonuses that can be purchased upon earning experience points during the game, which can confer additional abilities such as support powers (e.g. airstrikes), improvements to certain units, or access to additional units for construction.

=== Single-player ===
In a singleplayer mode, players can tackle one of three story campaigns (7 missions each), or try duels with "skirmish". While a training mission is provided to allow new players to become accustomed to the game, players can freely choose which campaign to tackle and at what difficulty, with each mission becoming moderately more difficult and featuring different scenarios to tackle.

=== Multiplayer ===
The multiplayer mode can be played both over the Internet or a local area network (LAN). It adopts a similar format to skirmish mode whereby the goal is to eliminate the other team. Games over the Internet can be completely random, in the form of a Quick Match. Players can also play in Custom Matches where the number of players, the map and rules are decided upon by the host.

The online feature originally worked via GameSpy servers. After the shutdown of GameSpy in 2014, these were no longer available.

The macOS version of the game does not support multiplayer. Apple discontinued Game Center for online play with the release of macOS Sierra.

=== Soundtrack ===
Generals presents players with a separate musical score for each faction. The United States' theme music consists of grand, militaristic scores composed by Bill Brown and Mikael Sandgren. China's musical themes feature apocalyptic, orchestral scores combined with East Asian instrumentation. The GLA faction's theme soundtrack can be described as a combination of Middle Eastern and few South Asian sounds coupled with heavy metal music.

== Plot ==
=== Setting ===
Generals takes place in a near future (c. early 2020s) where the United States and China cooperate to fight against the Global Liberation Army (GLA), a terrorist organization based in Central Asia. In chronological order, the campaign is played through the Chinese, GLA and then the United States perspectives respectively.

=== Factions ===
==== China (PLA) ====
A military parade in Beijing is attacked by GLA forces, culminating in the detonation of a stolen Chinese nuclear warhead and the beginning of the GLA's incursion inside China's borders. The Chinese mobilise to stall and contain the GLA, but in the process lose the Three Gorges Dam and the Hong Kong Convention and Exhibition Center. Now on the offensive, the Chinese attack GLA strongholds, arriving at the terror cell's main headquarters in Dushanbe. Utilising nuclear weapons, the Chinese put an end to the GLA's offensive.

==== Global Liberation Army (GLA) ====
Despite losses to China, the GLA maintains its presence across Central Asia and the Middle East. In efforts to revive itself, the GLA raid UN convoys and incite riots in Astana. However, the United States enters the war and a GLA renegade sides with the Chinese with the intention to destroy the organization. The GLA retaliate by attacking the Baikonur Cosmodrome, and uses the platform to launch devastating toxin attacks at highly populated cities.

==== United States of america (USA) ====
The United States sends its forces to the Middle East, Baghdad, the Hindu Kush, and then Kazakhstan to finally put an end to the GLA---at one point, they must deal with a rogue Chinese commander supporting the GLA. Despite losses incurred from GLA attacks and ambushes, the US are able to push the GLA back to their final stronghold in Akmola Region. With Chinese support, the US destroys the last GLA stronghold, ending the GLA's reign of tyranny.

== Development ==
Preliminary development of the game began in late 2000, shortly after the release of Command & Conquer: Red Alert 2. By July 2001, a working internal engine prototype had been developed. Development was announced to the public in early 2002, with a tentative release date of late 2002, though this was delayed in November 2002 to early 2003. According to Mark Skaggs, the project lead, the team experimented with three game engines, the Quake engine, the Unreal engine, and LithTech, before finally settling on the W3D engine used previously by Command & Conquer: Renegade as the basis for what would later become the SAGE engine. By March 2001, the team was still unsure of what game they were going to create, although they had already decided it was going be named Generals. Different concepts for the game were thought of, including a fantasy game and a Lord of the Rings title. A Lord of the Rings video game running on the SAGE engine was later released in 2004.

Infantry models from Renegade were used in maps to test the capabilities of the engine. As a proof of concept, the team took a number of Red Alert 2 units and put them on a test map. Because these units had already been created in a 3D program, it was "relatively easy" for the team to get them working in the 3D engine. Red Alert-styled units did appear in an engine prototype from July 2001 as shown in archived footage released in 2025.

The team also thought of creating a new product line, much like the Tiberian and Red Alert subseries. Ideas for such a product line were an "ancient warfare" game and a game with "futuristic robot armies."

One of the factions that was potentially going to be in the final game was an "African warlord" faction. Freelance concept artist TJ Frame, who designed most units in Red Alert 2, drew few sketches of possible units but the idea of an African side was eventually rejected, and the team kept brainstorming other potential factions. By mid-October, official design meetings commenced for Generals.

Early on in development, it was clear the game would feature three sides. During the final week of development on Yuri's Revenge, producer Harvard Bonin was still debating the sides and considering whether the team should drop the modern-warfare idea in Generals. The United States was considered as a possible "evil" faction.

By the end of 2001, the team had gone through five or six iterations of the unit list. However the exact factions had yet to be decided upon. A European faction was considered for inclusion in the game, and concept art was drawn for it.

By the start of 2002, the team were fully dedicated to Generals' development. At one point during development, the SAGE engine was given to Westwood Studios for the creation of an upcoming project in the Tiberian series.

=== Source code ===
The source code for Generals, and its expansion pack Zero Hour, was released under the GPL v3 license in 2025.

== Reception ==
Reception

Aggregate score
Aggregator	Score
Metacritic	84/100

After its release, Generals received mostly positive reviews. Based on 34 reviews, Metacritic gives it a score of 84/100, which includes a score of 9.3/10 from IGN. Generals has received the E3 2002 Game Critics Awards Best Strategy Game award. GameSpot named Generals the best computer game of February 2003. During the 7th Annual Interactive Achievement Awards, the Academy of Interactive Arts & Sciences awarded Generals with "Computer Strategy Game of the Year"; it also received nominations for "Computer Game of the Year" and "Game of the Year".

In the United Kingdom, it sold over 100,000 units during the first half of 2003. This made it the United Kingdom's second-best-selling computer game for the period, or seventh across all platforms. At the time, Kristan Reed of GamesIndustry.biz wrote that its performance proved "you can still have big hits on PC". Generals received a "Silver" sales award from the Entertainment and Leisure Software Publishers Association (ELSPA), indicating sales of at least 100,000 copies in the United Kingdom. The game's Deluxe release received another "Silver" award from ELSPA.

In 2013, a developer from Victory Games told Polygon.com that players of the game complained about offensive depictions of middle eastern people, and that it was taken into account for planned sequel. A 2024 review of the game published by Rock Paper Shotgun called the game "the best in the series" and said that it "plays well 20 years on", but criticized the way the game handled racist jokes, and added that "black comedy sometimes works".

The game was banned in China, for "smearing the image of China and the Chinese army".

=== Restrictions in Germany ===
Initially, the game was released in Germany under its international title Command & Conquer: Generals. However, the Bundesprüfstelle für jugendgefährdende Medien (Federal Department for Media Harmful to Young People) placed the game onto the "List of Media Harmful to Young People" two months after the initial release, which, by law, forbids further public advertising and any sale for people under 18 years of age. The BPjM stated that the game trivialized war.

Due to the restrictions, in the middle of 2003, EA released a localized version specifically for the German market called Command & Conquer: Generäle, with references to terrorism and real-world countries and places removed, as well as removing civilians and altering unit names and appearances. For example, the "terrorist" bomber unit is a "rolling bomb" and all other infantry units are changed into "cyborgs" (e.g., Red Guard becomes Standard Cyborg).

In September 2013, the restrictions were lifted and the uncut version was released with an 18+ rating.

== Sequel ==
In September 2003, an expansion pack called Generals – Zero Hour was released, which continues the story of Generals. In December 2011, a sequel, Command & Conquer: Generals 2, was announced, due to be released in 2013. Generals 2 was repurposed as a free-to-play game known as simply Command & Conquer. The new game would have started with the Generals franchise and may have expanded to the rest of the franchise post-release. The game's project was cancelled on October 29, 2013. Later in November, EA said that the game will still be developed by a new game studio, but no further news emerged and the project appears to be abandoned.
