= Command & Conquer =

Real-time strategy (RTS) video game franchise

- Genres: Real-time strategy (1995–2020); First-person shooter, Third-person shooter (2002)
- Developers: Westwood Studios (1995–2003); EA Los Angeles (2003–2010); Victory Games (2011–2013); EA Phenomic (2011–2013); EA Redwood Studios (2018–present)
- Publishers: Virgin Interactive Entertainment; Electronic Arts; Sega; Nintendo
- Platforms: Apple Mac, Nintendo 64, PlayStation, PC (MS-DOS, Windows), Sega Saturn, Xbox 360, Android, iOS
- First release: Command & Conquer; September 1995
- Latest release: Command & Conquer Remastered Collection; June 5, 2020

Command & Conquer (C&C) is a real-time strategy (RTS) video game franchise created and originally developed by Westwood Studios and currently owned by Electronic Arts. The first game was one of the earliest of the RTS genre, itself based on Westwood Studios' influential strategy game Dune II and introducing trademarks followed in the rest of the series. This includes full-motion video cutscenes with an ensemble cast to progress the story, as opposed to digitally in-game rendered cutscenes. Westwood Studios was purchased by Electronic Arts in 1998 and closed down in 2003. The studio and some of its members were absorbed into EA Los Angeles, which continued development on the series.

== History ==
After Westwood Studios developed the critically acclaimed Dune II, Computer Gaming World reported in 1993 that the company would not use the Dune license for Westwood's next strategy game "mostly because the programmers are tired of sand". The magazine stated that it would have "new terrain and enemies", and that "the design team is serious about doing a multi-player version".

Command & Conquer was released worldwide by Westwood in 1995. The plot is set sometime in the near future where the Earth becomes contaminated by a mysterious substance known as Tiberium. A global war ensues between the UN-formed Global Defense Initiative to contain it and the cult quasi-state revolutionary Brotherhood of Nod, led by the enigmatic Kane, which seeks to harness it. Highly successful, it was followed by Command & Conquer: Red Alert in 1996 which is set in an alternate universe where the Soviet Union wages war with the Allies. Developed as the prequel to the original, the Red Alert series eventually became a separate, lighthearted and comic series, while the original game and its sequels became known as the "Tiberium" series, retaining its science fiction and serious tone. The first game is sometimes referred to as Tiberian Dawn as a result.

The original game was followed by Command & Conquer: Tiberian Sun in 1999 and its expansion pack Firestorm. In 2002, Westwood Studios released Command & Conquer: Renegade, a first-person shooter. Renegade was praised for its online features. A spin-off game in 2003, Command & Conquer: Generals, set in a more realistic near-future and featuring the United States, China and the Global Liberation Army was followed by an expansion pack, Zero Hour. Command & Conquer 3: Tiberium Wars was released in 2007 and followed by the expansion pack Kane's Wrath. Command & Conquer 4: Tiberian Twilight, released in 2010 as the conclusion to the Tiberium saga, received mixed reviews because of its deviation from traditional gameplay and story. The Red Alert series was continued by the 2000 title Command & Conquer: Red Alert 2, its expansion, Yuri's Revenge and Command & Conquer: Red Alert 3 in 2008, which introduced a third faction, the Empire of the Rising Sun, which resembles Japan with futuristic robotic technology.

The series is primarily developed for personal computers running Microsoft Windows, although some titles have been ported to various video game consoles and Apple Mac. Other games for platforms such as iOS and web-based have also been developed. As of July 2010, the Command & Conquer franchise consists of eleven games and eight expansion packs. The first three games of the series have been released as freeware to promote the successors. A free-to-play game, entitled Command & Conquer, was in development with the studio Victory Games. It was set to be the next game in the series and was expected to be released in 2013. However, after a short alpha period the game was cancelled, and Victory Games disbanded by EA. The Command & Conquer series has been a commercial success with over 30 million Command & Conquer games sold as of 2009.

== Common elements ==
=== Gameplay ===
The Command & Conquer titles are real-time strategy games, with the exception of the first-person shooter Command & Conquer: Renegade. A staple of the series is the parallel campaigns of various different factions to one central storyline. Games in the series also offered multiplayer game options, via LAN and modem connection. All games in the series have also offered online play, as well as "skirmish" matches in which players can face AI enemies.

All Command & Conquer real-time strategy games except Command & Conquer: Generals and its expansions have featured the "side bar" for navigation and control as opposed to many other similar games where the control bar is located on the bottom of the screen.

Command & Conquer gameplay typically requires the player to construct a base and acquire resources, in order to fund the ongoing production of various types of forces with which to assault and conquer the opponent's base. All available structures of the faction chosen by the player are constructed on-site at so-called "construction yard" - which typically begin as large-sized vehicles capable of deploying themselves into the aforementioned construction yards, called MCVs or Mobile Construction Vehicle. When a construction yard has finished building a new structure, the player can select a spot near to a preexisting structure in order to place it, where the prefabricated building will rapidly unfold in a distinctive manner.

In all games in the series except Command & Conquer: Generals and its expansion Zero Hour, funds are acquired by specialized "harvester" units which bring their cargo (Tiberium for the Tiberian series of games or ore or the more valuable gems for the Red Alert series) to a "refinery" structure. This in turn will convert the raw material into usable resources, expressed as credits. The raw materials themselves, in games released before Red Alert 2 as well as Command & Conquer 3 require storage space in the form of refineries and, in the case of excess, "storage silo" structures. In Generals and Zero Hour, funds are collected by two methods: collection of supplies by specialized units and converted to money in "supply centers" or directly produced by specialized units, buildings, or tech buildings at a set interval of time.

All factions have structures and units with similar functions at their disposal. However, they are adjusted to fit each faction's theme and have somewhat varying properties. Units can be classified into infantry, vehicles, and aircraft, each with their own subdivisions (note: in the Red Alert series there is also naval craft available). Unit effectiveness against opponents follows the rock-paper-scissors (intransitivity) principle found in most real-time strategy games, and units' attack characteristics can vary according to faction.

Virtually every type of structure in the series acts as a tech tree node, and additional units, structures and faction-specific abilities will become available as new structures are built and placed. Access to advanced units and abilities may be temporarily blocked if the required structures are destroyed or if they are not being provided with adequate power by the supporting "power plant" structures.

==== Multiplayer ====
Each Command & Conquer game has included the ability to play multiplayer games against other players. Each box of Command & Conquer contained two CD copies of the game, making multiplayer gaming possible with a single purchase of the game. Westwood Studios advertised this on the packaging with the slogan "A second copy, so you and your friend can destroy each other." This resulted in Command & Conquer becoming the first RTS game title to feature competitive online play, and this is considered the most pertinent outside factor in the success of Command & Conquer. All games in the series up to Command & Conquer: Red Alert 2 featured two CDs that could be used for this reason. Later games did not.

Command & Conquer: Red Alert 3 was noted for being the first RTS game to enable the campaigns to be played cooperatively online; others had only supported single player campaigns. However, it was only possible to connect to other computers through EA's servers and not with LAN play.

Games produced by Westwood use the proprietary Westwood Online system to facilitate multiplayer games over the Internet; Renegade also supported GameSpy. Games under EA's development continued to use GameSpy, but dropped support for Westwood Online in favor of using EA's own servers. The GameSpy master servers have shut down in 2013, but some game titles can be played via Gameranger.

=== Characters ===
The Command & Conquer games frequently use full-motion video sequences featuring live actors to depict characters who advance the story and deliver mission briefings. In many of the games, the player assumes the role of an unnamed military commander addressed directly by the characters appearing in these sequences. The series also features named playable characters, particularly specialised infantry known as hero units, who possess abilities unavailable to ordinary soldiers.

Joseph D. Kucan as Kane in a cutscene from Command & Conquer 3: Tiberium Wars.

Kane, portrayed by Joseph D. Kucan, is the leader of the Brotherhood of Nod, a quasi-religious organisation opposed to the Global Defense Initiative (GDI) in the Tiberium storyline. Introduced in the original Command & Conquer (1995), he also appears in the Soviet campaign of Red Alert (1996) and returns throughout the Tiberium sequels. His apparently unchanged appearance over several decades, repeated survival of seemingly fatal events and uncertain origins are recurring elements of the storyline. Kucan, who also directed Westwood Studios' early live-action cinematics, helped develop Kane's characterisation through discussions with designer Eydie Laramore about his backstory and the religious imagery surrounding Nod. Kucan deliberately avoided definitive explanations of Kane's origins and apparent immortality, preferring to leave these questions open to players' interpretations. Kucan subsequently developed Kane's portrayal in response to aspects of the character that resonated with players early in the series. Following Westwood's closure, he returned to the role in Tiberium Wars (2007), its expansion Kane's Wrath (2008), and Tiberian Twilight (2010).

Other characters in the Tiberium storyline include Michael McNeil, the GDI commander played by Michael Biehn in Tiberian Sun (1999), and his Nod counterpart Anton Slavik, portrayed by Frank Zagarino. James Earl Jones played McNeil's superior, General James Solomon. Unlike the largely unseen player commanders of earlier games, McNeil and Slavik are identifiable protagonists who participate in the live-action story. The parallel Red Alert storyline incorporates fictionalised historical figures, including Albert Einstein, whose time-travel experiment removing Adolf Hitler from history provides the premise of the original game. Another recurring character is Tanya Adams, an Allied commando portrayed by Lynne Litteer in Red Alert, Kari Wuhrer in Red Alert 2 (2000), and Jenny McCarthy in Red Alert 3 (2008). Red Alert 2 also introduced Yuri, a psychic adviser to the Soviet leadership portrayed by Udo Kier, who subsequently becomes the principal antagonist of Yuri's Revenge (2001).

Playable commandos have appeared throughout the series. The original Command & Conquer included a commando unit equipped with a sniper rifle and explosives capable of destroying enemy structures. Red Alert introduced Tanya as a named counterpart, armed with pistols and demolition charges. The Red Alert expansions Counterstrike and The Aftermath featured Volkov, a Soviet cyborg supersoldier, and Chitzkoi, his cybernetic attack dog, as controllable units in particular campaign missions. Tiberian Sun introduced the Forgotten, a faction of mutants whose members include Umagon, a sniper appearing in GDI campaign missions, and Ghost Stalker, a railgun-equipped commando who can also be trained as a GDI hero unit. The commando concept became the basis for Renegade (2002), a first-person shooter in which the player directly controls Nick "Havoc" Parker, a GDI special forces operative fighting against Nod.

Later instalments introduced additional named hero units with faction-specific abilities. Yuri's Revenge added Boris, a Soviet commando capable of calling in airstrikes, and Yuri Prime, a playable version of Yuri equipped with psychic mind-control abilities. Generals (2003) assigned a hero to each of its three factions: Colonel Burton, an American commando specialising in stealth and demolition; Black Lotus, a Chinese operative capable of hacking and capturing enemy structures; and Jarmen Kell, a sniper serving the Global Liberation Army. Red Alert 3 featured three factional commandos: Tanya for the Allies, Natasha Volkova for the Soviet Union, and Yuriko Omega, a psychic operative serving the Empire of the Rising Sun. Yuriko subsequently became the playable protagonist of a dedicated campaign in Uprising (2009), which replaced conventional base building with direct control of the character and the progressive unlocking of psychic abilities.

== Games ==
=== Tiberian series ===
Command & Conquer, released on September 26, 1995, is the first game in the series, which takes place sometime between 2017 and 2020, according to the Command & Conquer: Renegade manual. It is considered the title which originally defined and popularized the real-time strategy genre. Command & Conquer introduced the warring factions of the Global Defense Initiative (GDI) and the Brotherhood of Nod. Command & Conquer was well received and was widely praised by critics: "Command & Conquer is one of the finest, most brilliantly-designed computer games I have ever seen", said GameSpot reviewer Chris Hudak. Command & Conquer has attained 94% as an aggregate score from Metacritic with the less well received Covert Operations expansion pack obtaining an aggregate score of 72% after its 1996 release.

Command & Conquer: Tiberian Sun, released on August 27, 1999, takes place in the year 2030. While the original Command & Conquer's plot was centered around an allegorical world politics setting, Tiberian Sun shifted this to a more science fiction-like setting against the apocalyptic background of Tiberium beginning to assimilate vast portions of the Earth's ecosystems. In 1998, Westwood Studios, the developers of Tiberian Sun, was acquired by Electronic Arts. However, EA had no direct part in the development of the title. Compared to its predecessor, Tiberian Sun relies heavily on science fiction technologies and introduces a new isometric game engine featuring varying level terrain to give the impression of a true 3D environment.

The full motion video is also scripted differently; while the cutscenes of Command & Conquer and Red Alert were filmed from a first-person perspective, Tiberian Sun used traditional cinematic shots for its FMVs featuring actors such as James Earl Jones and Michael Biehn.

Command & Conquer: Renegade, released February 26, 2002, takes place in the final days of the events of Command & Conquer and was the last Command & Conquer game to be created by Westwood Studios before their liquidation in 2003. Unlike any other games in the series, Renegade is a first-person shooter. Although receiving average reviews, with an aggregate score of 75% on both GameRankings and Metacritic, Renegade was praised for its online features. GameSpy awarded Renegade its 2002 "Wish it had been better" award, condemning the single player but saying that "C&C: Renegade's multiplayer was innovative and fun". Online play was praised for encouraging teamwork and coordinated assaults, unlike other contemporary first-person shooters.

Command & Conquer 3: Tiberium Wars, released March 29, 2007, was a return to the real-time strategy roots of the Command & Conquer series. As a direct sequel to Tiberian Sun, Tiberium Wars is set in 2047 and features the introduction of a third faction, the Scrin. The sequel attained an aggregate score of 85% from both GameRankings and Metacritic. PC Gamer U.S. gave the game its "Editor's Choice" rating at 90%, stating that "one of the greatest RTS franchises of all time returns to glory", while PC Gamer UK gave it a more reserved rating of 82%, stating that it was "a welcome, but limited, return".

Shortly after the release of Tiberium Wars, the expansion pack Command & Conquer 3: Kane's Wrath was announced. Released on March 24, 2008, Kane's Wrath limited the player to only the Brotherhood of Nod in the campaign mode, though the original factions and six new sub-factions are available for the new strategic mode and skirmish mode and it takes place in 2052. Reception was mainly positive with the expansion attaining an aggregate score of 77%.

Command & Conquer 4: Tiberian Twilight, released on March 16, 2010, saw a big change in gameplay from the previous Command & Conquer by removing the resource gathering and base building elements in previous games as well as the removal of the third faction, the Scrin. It is a direct sequel to Kane's Wrath (however not directly following on from its storyline), and is set in 2062, a time when Tiberium has advanced to its next evolutionary stage, and is rapidly spreading across Earth, making it soon to be uninhabitable.

Renegade X, is a free, fan-made remake of Command & Conquer: Renegade. The developers received approval from EA to release their game, and it entered open beta on February 26, 2014. Renegade X includes a short single-player campaign called Black Dawn.

Command & Conquer Remastered Collection. EA announced in November 2018 its plans to remaster Command & Conquer, including expansions and Red Alert, for modern computer systems through Petroglyph Games. It was released on June 5, 2020. The Remastered Collection received a score of 82/100 on Metacritic, with 48 positive, ten mixed and zero negative reviews, indicating a "generally favorable" reception. Along with the release, EA also released the source code for the remastered versions of the base game and Red Alert to allow players to build improved mods for the games.

=== Red Alert series ===
Command & Conquer: Red Alert, released on November 22, 1996, is set in an alternate universe 1950s and was originally made to be the prequel to Command & Conquer establishing Red Alert as the prologue of the entire Tiberium series of games. Louis Castle has said that connecting Red Alert with the Tiberium series was a "failed experiment". Red Alert introduces the Allies and the Soviets as rival factions roughly analogous to NATO and the Warsaw Pact of the Cold War. The game was received well by critics and has the highest average score of any Command & Conquer game with an average of over 90% from GameRankings and Metacritic, unlike the title's two expansion packs, Red Alert: Counterstrike and Red Alert: The Aftermath of which both received below average reviews for the series with 63% and 70% average scores respectively. Both expansions gave the game more missions and more units. For PlayStation only, there was also a separate release to the original called Red Alert: Retaliation which included all the maps, missions and units of Red Alert: Counterstrike and Red Alert: The Aftermath, as well as some newly filmed cut-scenes only available with Red Alert: Retaliation. Before being re-released as freeware on August 31, 2008, by Electronic Arts Command & Conquer: Red Alert had sold over three million copies.

Command & Conquer: Red Alert 2 was released on October 23, 2000. It featured a Soviet invasion of North America with tanks, conscripts, large airships, and psychically dominated anti-ship giant squid. Since that game lacked reference to the Tiberian series, the connection established in the first Red Alert game became unclear. However, it has been implied by the original creators of the series, now working at Petroglyph Games, that Red Alert 2 takes place in a parallel universe that came about as a result of time travel experiments taking place some time into the Tiberian series. Red Alert 2 was received fairly positively with an aggregate score of 86% from GameRankings.

An expansion pack to Red Alert 2, Command & Conquer: Yuri's Revenge was released on October 10, 2001. In Yuri's Revenge, an ex-Soviet figure named Yuri, tries to conquer the world using psychic technology and his own private army. The expansion pack received mostly positive reviews. GameRankings reports an average score of 85% based on 31 reviews, making Yuri's Revenge the best received expansion pack in the Command & Conquer series.

Command & Conquer: Red Alert 3, released on October 28, 2008, followed up on the story of Red Alert 2 and continued the series' more "light-hearted" take on Command & Conquer. It introduced many new comical units and the Empire of the Rising Sun faction, an anime inspired version of the Empire of Japan. Executive producer Chris Corry stated in a pre-release interview that Red Alert 3 will further differentiate the playable factions from each other and "[play] up the silliness in their faction design whenever possible". This approach was seen as popular with Red Alert 3 obtaining an aggregate score of 82% from Metacritic. A stand-alone expansion to Red Alert 3, Command & Conquer: Red Alert 3 – Uprising was released on March 12, 2009, to fairly poor reviews for the series with an average score of 64% from Metacritic. Another downloadable standalone game for the PlayStation 3 and Xbox 360 was released known as Command & Conquer: Red Alert 3 - Commander's Challenge which contained the Commander's Challenge mode of Uprising for consoles.

Command & Conquer: Red Alert was released on October 16, 2009, for iOS which was a continuation of the story of Red Alert 2 and takes place before Red Alert 3. It contained two factions, the Allies and Soviet Union with a third faction, the Empire of the Rising Sun, to be added in its expansion pack. This version of the game is not available in some regions (e.g. the UK).

The Chinese developer Tencent made a new iOS version of Red Alert, with a highly mixed reception from fans online.

=== Generals series ===
Command & Conquer: Generals, released on February 10, 2003, has a plotline which is unrelated to the other games of the Command & Conquer series. Generals is set in the near future and features the United States, China and the fictional terrorist organization, the Global Liberation Army. Generals uses an engine dubbed SAGE (or Strategy Action Game Engine) and is the first fully three-dimensional Command & Conquer real-time strategy game. After its release, Generals received mostly positive reviews. Based on 34 reviews, Metacritic gives it a score of 84/100 which includes a score of 9.3/10 from IGN. Generals has also received the E3 2002 Game Critics Awards Best Strategy Game award. One review noted that Generals was the first Command & Conquer real-time strategy game that did not include full-motion video cutscenes to tell the story and that it departed from the unique interface and base-building mechanics that had characterized all of the previous Command & Conquer RTS titles.

An expansion for Generals, Command & Conquer: Generals – Zero Hour, was released on September 22, 2003, to further the Generals storyline. Zero Hour added nine new armies to the game, over a dozen new campaign missions, and a gameplay mode known as Generals Challenge. Unlike Generals, Zero Hour featured the return of full motion videos to the series. Zero Hour obtained much the same reception as Generals, with an aggregate score of 85% and 84% from GameRankings and Metacritic respectively.

After EA Los Angeles started up their new internal group Danger Close and switched its focus to the Medal of Honor series, EA launched a new studio named Victory Games to continue the Command & Conquer franchise. On December 10, 2011, Electronic Arts posted that the next game in the series would be Command & Conquer: Generals 2. Three days later, a new browser-based, free-to-play MMO Command & Conquer game was also under development, under the name Command & Conquer: Tiberium Alliances. On December 15, Tiberium Alliances began a closed beta.

In August 2012, Generals 2 was repurposed as a free-to-play game known as simply Command & Conquer. The new game would have been based around the Generals franchise. However, following feedback from players who were able to play the alpha trial, the game was cancelled in October 2013. EA has said that the franchise will continue, but has given no other information at the time.

=== Later releases ===
In October 2012, EA released Command & Conquer: The Ultimate Collection on Origin; it includes every game in the series except Command & Conquer: Sole Survivor.

EA revealed Command & Conquer: Rivals, which was under development by the newly formed EA Redwood Studios and released for Android and iOS mobile devices in December 2018.

Petroglyph Games released remastered versions of Red Alert and Command and Conquer in June 2020, where both games have been updated with features that improve gameplay for players while also including all expansions initially released for the games. EA also released the source code for the remastered versions of Tiberian Dawn and Red Alert.

In March 2024, EA released Command & Conquer: The Ultimate Collection on Steam, with newly added level editors in accordance to fan demand.

In February 2025, EA made the original source code for Command & Conquer, Red Alert, Generals, Zero Hour and Renegade open-source.

== Chronology ==
Westwood Studios (1995–2002)

- 1995 – Command & Conquer
  - 1996 – Command & Conquer – The Covert Operations
- 1996 – Command & Conquer: Red Alert
  - 1997 – Command & Conquer: Red Alert – Counterstrike
  - 1997 – Command & Conquer: Red Alert – The Aftermath
  - 1998 – Command & Conquer: Red Alert – Retaliation
- 1997 – Command & Conquer: Sole Survivor
- 1999 – Command & Conquer: Tiberian Sun
  - 2000 – Command & Conquer: Tiberian Sun – Firestorm
- 2000 – Command & Conquer: Red Alert 2
  - 2001 – Command & Conquer: Yuri's Revenge
- 2002 – Command & Conquer: Renegade

EA Los Angeles (2003–2010)

- 2003 – Command & Conquer: Generals
  - 2003 – Command & Conquer: Generals – Zero Hour
- 2007 – Command & Conquer 3: Tiberium Wars
  - 2008 – Command & Conquer 3: Kane's Wrath
- 2008 – Command & Conquer: Red Alert 3
  - 2009 – Command & Conquer: Red Alert 3 – Uprising
- 2010 – Command & Conquer 4: Tiberian Twilight

EA Phenomic (2011)

- 2012 – Command & Conquer: Tiberium Alliances

EA Redwood Studios (2018–)

- 2018 – Command & Conquer: Rivals

Petroglyph Games (2020)

- 2020 – Command & Conquer Remastered Collection

== Music ==
Much of the music for the series was composed and produced by Westwood Studios' former sound director and video game music composer Frank Klepacki for the early games, with composition duties being taken on by several others following the liquidation of Westwood Studios in 2003. Klepacki returned to the series in 2008 to assist with the soundtrack for Red Alert 3.

The music has been received positively by critics, although praise was higher with earlier entries.

The original score for Command & Conquer: Red Alert was composed by Frank Klepacki and was voted the best video game soundtrack of 1996 by PC Gamer and Gameslice magazines. Among his most famous songs from the series is the theme of Red Alert, titled "Hell March", which accents the style of the game with adrenalized riffs of electric guitar, the sounds of marching feet, and synthesizers to a dramatic chant. Originally intended to be the theme for the Brotherhood of Nod faction in the Covert Operations expansion to the original 1995 Command & Conquer game, the track eventually ended up enlisting itself as a staple in the Red Alert series instead, and a second version of "Hell March" was specifically created for Command & Conquer: Red Alert 2.

After C&C came out we wasted no time kicking out Covert Ops. I wrote some more ambient style themes they asked me for, and then I began tinkering with this heavy metal song that I was trying to gear towards Nod for the next big C&C game. Brett Sperry came in my office and said "You got anything I can hear for the new C&C?" I played it for him. He said "What's the name of this one?" I said "Hell March". He said "That's the signature song for our next game".

— Frank Klepacki, Senior Composer

== Reception ==
The Command & Conquer series have been a commercial success with over 30 million Command & Conquer games sold as of 2009. In 1997, Screen Digest said it was "probably the world's biggest PC CD-ROM entertainment franchise to date." By 1999, it had sold more than 10 million copies.

Games in the series have nearly consistently scored highly on video game review aggregator websites GameRankings and Metacritic, which collect data from numerous review websites. As noted in the table below, the highest rated game is Command & Conquer with a score of 94% from Metacritic. The highest rated game averaged over both sites is Command & Conquer: Red Alert with an average of just over 90%. As a series, Command & Conquer games have averaged approximately 80% when including expansion packs and approximately 84% without.

Command & Conquer's long history resulted in Guinness World Records awarding the series six world records in the Guinness World Records: Gamer's Edition 2008 These records include "Biggest Selling RTS Series", "Most Number of Platforms for an RTS", and "Longest Running Actor in Video Game Role" for Joe Kucan, who has played the part of Kane, the villainous mastermind of the series, for 15 years.

=== Characters and performances ===
The series' live-action performances and recurring characters have attracted critical attention. In a retrospective for GameSpot, Andrew Park identified the filmed cutscenes, commando units and Joseph D. Kucan's portrayal of Kane as longstanding features of Command & Conquer. Park also traced the introduction of specialised hero units to the original game's commando, describing it as arguably the first such unit in a real-time strategy game. Writing for PCGamesN in 2020, Richard Scott-Jones examined the changes in Kane's characterisation alongside the increasingly elaborate science-fiction setting of the Tiberium games. He contrasted Kucan's comparatively restrained performance in the original game with the more theatrical portrayal of Kane in later instalments.

Kane has also been discussed in analyses of video game antagonists. Kevin VanOrd of GameSpot used Kane as an example of a villain whose motivations are conveyed through narrative context, particularly biblical allusions and the rivalry between Kane and Seth in the original game. An article published by Kill Screen questioned the portrayal of religion within the Brotherhood of Nod, arguing that the organisation functions more convincingly as a personality cult centred on Kane than as a coherent religious faith. The article pointed to the absence of a clearly articulated spiritual doctrine despite the Brotherhood's religious language and its members' willingness to sacrifice themselves for Kane. In 2008, Joe Martin of Bit-tech ranked him fifth among computer game non-player characters, citing his charisma, ability to command followers, mysterious objectives and Kucan's performance. Empire Magazine ranked Kane number 31 on its ranking of the 50 Greatest Video Game Characters and called Kucan's performance as the character "camp perfection". In 2021, Rick Lane of PC Gamer placed Kane seventh in a ranking of the 50 most iconic characters in PC gaming, attributing much of his prominence to Kucan's sustained performance.

The more exaggerated performances of the Red Alert games have received particular attention. Reviewing Red Alert 3, VanOrd praised the deliberately excessive acting and humour of its live-action sequences, singling out Tim Curry as Soviet premier Anatoly Cherdenko, J. K. Simmons as American president Howard Ackerman, George Takei as Emperor Yoshiro, and Jenny McCarthy as Tanya. He considered the theatrical presentation an important part of the game's appeal. In contrast, VanOrd found the new and returning performances in Uprising less effective, although he regarded Yuriko's campaign as the expansion's principal storytelling highlight.

The playable commandos have also been examined for their contributions to the games' design. Reviewing Renegade, Greg Kasavin of GameSpot described the original commando as one of the most memorable units in Command & Conquer, and compared Havoc's personality and dialogue to Solid Snake from the Metal Gear series. He found the character's one-liners effective and noted their connection to the original unit's dialogue. Yuriko Omega's campaign in Uprising attracted mixed responses for departing from conventional real-time strategy gameplay. GamesRadar+ initially welcomed the use of her telekinetic powers and the departure from standard mechanics, but found the later missions excessively restrictive. Similarly, VanOrd of GameSpot considered the campaign's combination of action role-playing and strategy insufficiently developed, criticising its limited environments and tactical depth.

Aggregate review scores As of April 16, 2011.
Game	Year	GameRankings	Metacritic
Command & Conquer	1995	84.33%	94%
The Covert Operations	1996	72%	86%
Sole Survivor	1997	62%	–
Command & Conquer 2: Tiberian Sun	1999	80%	84%
Firestorm	2000	73%	85%
Command & Conquer: Renegade	2002	75%	75%
Command & Conquer 3: Tiberium Wars	2007	85%	85%
Kane's Wrath	2008	77%	77%
Command & Conquer 4: Tiberian Twilight	2010	63%	64%
Command & Conquer: Red Alert	1996	91%	90%
Counterstrike	1997	63%	83%
The Aftermath	1997	70%	85%
Command & Conquer: Red Alert 2	2000	86%	84%
Yuri's Revenge	2001	85%	86%
Command & Conquer: Red Alert 3	2008	81%	82%
Uprising	2009	65%	64%
Command & Conquer: Generals	2003	85%	84%
Zero Hour	2003	84%	83%
Command & Conquer: Remastered Collection	2020	-	82%

== Sources ==
- Eastman, David (1995). Official Guide to Command & Conquer (Periodical). 2. Indianapolis, IN: Brady Pub.
