= Command & Conquer 3: Kane's Wrath =

2008 video game expansion pack

- Developers: EA Los Angeles; BreakAway Games
- Publisher: Electronic Arts
- Producers: Jim Vessella; Michael Rea
- Designers: Samuel Bass; Warren Capps
- Programmers: Brian Wade; Tim Murray; Scott Nisenfeld
- Artists: Mike Colonnese; Jim Alary; Daniel Mycka
- Writers: Samuel Bass; Haris Orkin
- Composers: Jamie Christopherson; Mikael Sandgren
- Series: Command & Conquer
- Engine: SAGE
- Platforms: Microsoft Windows, Xbox 360
- Release: Microsoft Windows: NA: March 25, 2008; AU: March 27, 2008; EU: March 28, 2008; Xbox 360: NA: June 23, 2008; AU: June 26, 2008; EU: June 27, 2008
- Genre: Real-time strategy
- Modes: Single-player, multiplayer

Command & Conquer 3: Kane's Wrath is a stand-alone expansion pack for the 2007 real-time strategy video game Command & Conquer 3: Tiberium Wars. Developed by EA Los Angeles studios and BreakAway Games studios, it was released worldwide in March 2008 for Microsoft Windows and in June 2008 for Xbox 360 by publisher Electronic Arts.

Additionally, the game can be purchased from the Xbox digital store and played on Xbox One and Xbox Series consoles through the Xbox backwards compatibility program.

The storyline campaign is set between the end of Tiberian Sun and the beginning of Tiberium Wars. It revolves around the seemingly immortal leader of the Brotherhood of Nod, Kane, and recounts his ascent to power after narrowly escaping death in the year 2034, ending with Kane re-acquiring the Tacitus artifact from Tiberian Sun, in the year 2052.

== Gameplay ==
=== Global Conquest mode ===
The Global Conquest mode map. Pictured is Europe controlled by Scrin forces, and Africa controlled by GDI forces with Nod having cloaked in south Asia.

Kane's Wrath features a "Risk-like" gameplay mode called "Global Conquest", where players build and control their forces from a strategic, global level with the goal of either destroying all enemies or completing their side's alternate victory objective. Instead of the traditional Command & Conquer RTS gameplay, the mode uses a turn-based system where the player issues higher-level orders such as "build a base here" (to have the computer automatically build a base with preset structures) or "upgrade this base" (to have the computer automatically perform multiple structure upgrades on a base); the orders execute at the end of a turn and the other sides then get theirs. Combat in this mode occurs whenever two opposing forces collide on the world map; the battle can either be played traditionally (as a standard real-time C&C game) or be automatically resolved by the computer using the forces' relative strengths.

=== Kane's Challenge mode (Xbox 360) ===
Kane's Challenge is exclusive to the Xbox 360 version of Kane's Wrath, replacing Global Conquest Mode. Similar to the General's Challenge game in Command & Conquer: Generals – Zero Hour, the player chooses one of the nine factions, and is pitted against all armies spanning ten challenges; referred to as "The Gauntlet" in-game. Also included in this game mode are all-new, high-definition video sequences featuring Joseph D. Kucan as Kane, congratulating or taunting the players as they progress in Kane's Challenge.

== Plot ==
In the first act of the campaign (set shortly after the conclusion of Firestorm), Kane enters a bunker deep in the underground, apparently healed of all injury save for his face mask. He instructs LEGION to incite the Rio Insurrection by taking out the GDI presence in the area and giving Kane a substantial number of followers. After the player succeeds, Kane informs the player of his plan to reunite the Nod splinter factions. Since he cannot risk revealing himself to the world yet, he chooses Brother Marcion, the leader of the "new" Black Hand to convey Kane's will to the Brotherhood in his stead (since Marcion had Anton Slavik assassinated). The player is then commanded to destroy Marcion's stronghold in Australia and capture him. Brought before Kane, Marcion comes back into the fold of the Brotherhood as Kane reveals himself to him, and removes his face mask, showing a completely scar-free face. Kane then orders the player to destroy a liquid Tiberium facility in the Australian Outback as a 'grand gesture' to the remaining splinter factions to rejoin him, resulting in massive Tiberium fallout across Australia. Kane deactivates LEGION and begins to build Nod into a superpower.

During the second act (set before and during the events of Tiberium Wars), Kane begins to lay down the plans for the destruction of the Philadelphia, commanding the player to steal plans for the Ion Cannon network. Since the destruction of the Philadelphia would eliminate most of GDI's leadership, Kane predicts that Redmond Boyle will be his pawn and become the Director of GDI, so as to provoke the future liquid Tiberium explosion. The player is also ordered to capture Dr. Alphonse Giraud from his research facility, explaining his disappearance in the GDI campaign of Tiberium Wars. Afterwards, Abbess Alexa Kovacs has taken the view that General Kilian Qatar is a traitor to Kane, and plans to have her discredited by attacking Temple Prime in her guise, then leaking Ion Disruptor technology to GDI, thereby leading to General Qatar's execution being ordered by Kane. She reveals her doubts and fears about LEGION, and about LEGION being connected to the Tacitus during a cutscene before a mission and also tells the player that CABAL's cyborgs murdered her family, and is worried as LEGION is based upon the same technology that created and powered CABAL. After the Tacitus is secured on a mission, a highly distressed Kovacs snaps and infects LEGION's core systems with a powerful computer virus, fearing that the AI will turn hostile like CABAL upon interfacing with the artifact. The virus destroys LEGION's systems, and Kane is alerted to LEGION's infection and catches Kovacs red-handed in the act of destroying LEGION. Kane discovers to his horror that Kovacs attacked Temple Prime in Qatar's guise and had Qatar executed for a crime she did not commit. Kovacs snatches a pistol from one of the guards as she is about to be taken away for interrogation and aims at Kane with it. Clearly beside herself, she shouts Nod's motto "Peace through power" before committing suicide by shooting herself in the head, just as LEGION shuts down.

In the third and final act, LEGION reawakens five years later in the post-Third Tiberium War period, and Kane focuses it on recovering the Tacitus. GDI has been meddling with the device, causing it to become highly unstable; Kane needs the Tacitus for his master plan, so he orders the player to first awaken the Marked of Kane, a faction of cyborgs that only LEGION is capable of controlling due to its link with the destroyed CABAL. With the successful reactivation, Kane then sends the player to recover the Tacitus from GDI's Rocky Mountains Complex. After the Tacitus's successful capture, Kane connects it to LEGION, and the AI becomes infused with the vast knowledge of the object, ending the game in a cliffhanger. The ending cutscene shows a reverse of the Scrin campaign introduction cutscene in Tiberium Wars, and a message that implies that the Scrin would later try to send a full invasion force, similar to what the Scrin Overlord states at the end of the Scrin campaign in Tiberium Wars.

== Bonus content ==
Every copy of Kane's Wrath, including the bundled Command & Conquer 3 Limited Edition, included a code which entitled the player to enter into the beta for the next Red Alert game, Red Alert 3, if the code was registered before September 15, 2008. The beta started in August for most participants who bought the game in retail stores and registered quickly and the beta was reported to be 500,000 strong on August 3.

A special edition version of Kane's Wrath which included a Kane's Wrath Razer DeathAdder mouse was released exclusively for Singapore customers.

== Reception ==
Reception

Aggregate score
Aggregator	Score
Metacritic	PC: 77/100; X360: 75/100

Review scores
Publication	Score
1Up.com	9.1/10
Game Informer	7.25/10
GamePro	4.5/5
GameSpot	7.5/10
GameSpy	3/5
IGN	7.9/10
Official Xbox Magazine (US)	6.5/10
GameTap	8/10
Strategy Informer	8.0/10

The expansion has received generally favorable reviews, averaging a 77/100 score on Metacritic. IGN rated the game 7.9, saying: "Ultimately, Kane's Wrath is something that old-school RTS fans and die-hard C&C veterans will enjoy. There's enough here to keep them busy for a long time. Those looking for a more modern RTS experience should look elsewhere, though".
