= Command & Conquer (1995 video game) =

1995 video game

- Developers: Westwood Studios; Looking Glass Studios (N64)
- Publishers: NA: Westwood Studios; EU: Virgin Interactive Entertainment (PC); WW: Nintendo (N64)
- Producers: Brett Sperry; Edward Del Castillo
- Designer: Erik Yeo
- Programmers: Joseph Bostic; William Randolph
- Writers: Eydie Laramore; Ron Smith; Joseph D. Kucan
- Composer: Frank Klepacki
- Series: Command & Conquer
- Platforms: DOS, Sega Saturn, PlayStation, Mac OS, Windows 95, Nintendo 64
- Release: September 26, 1995: DOS; NA: September 26, 1995; EU: September 29, 1995 Saturn; EU: December 6, 1996; NA: December 1996 PlayStation; EU: December 13, 1996; NA: March 17, 1997 Mac OS; NA: December 18, 1996 Windows March 10, 1997 Nintendo 64; NA: June 29, 1999; EU: July 30, 1999
- Genre: Real-time strategy
- Modes: Single-player, multiplayer

Command & Conquer (also known by the retronym Command & Conquer: Tiberian Dawn) is a real-time strategy video game developed and published by Westwood Studios in 1995. Set in an alternate history, the game tells the story of a world war between two globalized factions: the Global Defense Initiative of the United Nations and a revolutionary militant organization called the Brotherhood of Nod, led by the mysterious Kane.

Westwood conceived Command & Conquer during the final stages of the development of Dune II, and it expands on ideas explored in that title. Inspired by the events of the era, particularly the Gulf War, the team gave the game a modern warfare setting. The game contains live-action full motion video cutscenes, which star Westwood employees and few professional actors, including Joseph D. Kucan, who plays Kane. The Nintendo 64 port was developed by Looking Glass Studios.

Command & Conquer was a commercial and critical success, selling over three million copies and winning numerous awards. It has been cited as one of the greatest games ever made, and the title that defined and popularized the real-time strategy genre. The game was the first in the Command & Conquer series, which sold 30 million copies by 2009. To mark the 12th anniversary of the franchise, Electronic Arts, the current publisher and owner of the series, released the game for free in 2007.

A remastered version of the game was released in 2020 as part of the Command & Conquer Remastered Collection.

== Gameplay ==
Command & Conquer involves players operating as one of two playable factions on a map - the Global Defense Initiative (GDI), and the Brotherhood of Nod - developing bases, gathering resources and using them to produce troops, and then defeating their opponents by eliminating their army and either destroying or capturing their base. Base production and unit training is funded by gathering Tiberium, the game's sole resource, through the use of harvesting units, and processing them into credits through a refinery structure. Each faction has its own unique types of units, its own superweapon, and its own combat strategy: GDI relies on superior firepower and armour at the expense of greater production costs and slower movement; while Nod relies on a combination of numerical superiority, superior speed, and unconventional tactics, generally at the expense of less firepower and poor durability.

Producing units requires establishing a base through a special unit called a Mobile Construction Vehicle (MCV) - MCVs can only be deployed in open flat land, and structures must be placed within close proximity with each other. Bases can be protected with various defensive structures such as sandbags, gun turrets and concrete walls, and units are produced in production structures (i.e. Barracks for infantry, Factory for vehicles, Helipad for aircraft), with tech buildings helping to unlock more advanced units; construction options function on a tech tree, in that certain buildings must be constructed to unlock new options. Silos can be built to store more resources, as the refinery structures can only hold a finite amount, repair facilities can be built to repair damaged vehicles, and power plants are required to keep the base operational - low power slows down production, stops defensive weapons working, and causes buildings to slowly take damage over time until sufficient power is restored (either by constructing additional power plants, or selling off extra buildings to reduce total power requirements). In total, the game contains around fifty units and structures.

Command & Conquer features two single-player campaigns, one for each faction, in which the player must undertake a series of missions across a campaign map for their chosen faction. The objective of most campaign missions is usually to destroy units, or destroy / take control of enemy buildings, with each mission beginning with a briefing conducted using a mix of computer animations and live-action full motion video (FMV). At times during the campaign, the player can choose which mission to undertake, which offer different scenarios to overcome.

The original DOS release features multiplayer with up to four players, a rarity at the time, with internet-based multiplayer being made available in Command & Conquer Gold, which also features SVGA visuals. The game's Sega Saturn and PlayStation ports lack multiplayer support, though the latter was released with the inclusion of the fifteen single-player missions from The Covert Operations expansion pack, as well as six new Special Ops missions, including a secret one. The Nintendo 64 version, while lacking multiplayer support as well, features updated graphics, with 3D models and environments, and four new Special Ops missions (which are different from the ones in the PlayStation port), though the FMV cutscenes were removed and replaced with static images, accompanied by voice acting and sound effects.

== Plot ==
=== Setting ===
Command & Conquer is set in an alternate history, and begins with a meteor crashing near the river Tiber in Italy in 1995. The meteorite brings with it an alien substance that scientists call Tiberium, named after its impact site, which can absorb and crystallize precious metals from the surrounding soil, but also transform its surroundings and produce extremely toxic gases and radiation that is fatal to humans and animals. An ancient, cultic society called the Brotherhood of Nod, who claims to have foreseen the potentials of this new substance through their self-proclaimed messianic figure known only as Kane, invests in the development of technology to harvest and refine Tiberium crystals, far ahead of the global scientific community's own research, and use the resources it gathers to accumulate a rapidly growing army of followers worldwide.

By the beginning of the game, Tiberium has spread across the planet, with Nod forces gaining control of nearly half of the rapidly growing substance through footholds in some of the poorest nations. This wealth has enabled Nod forces to conduct increasingly ambitious terrorist attacks in wealthy countries. The Global Defense Initiative, initially formed by the United Nations as a multinational peacekeeping force in the aftermath of an alternate version of World War II, has since been repurposed as a global anti-terrorist organization, and makes its new goal the elimination of Nod across the globe. The conflict between the two sides eventually culminates in a world-wide war between GDI and Nod, with the Nod campaign taking place in Africa and the GDI campaign being set in Europe. The player's character is not identified directly in the game. While the Nod campaign character is simply referred to as "Nod Commander", the sequel Tiberian Sun established the GDI commander to be named James Solomon.

=== GDI campaign ===
With the UN calling for GDI to assist in combating Nod in Europe, the player assists as a GDI commander under the command of General Mark Jamison Sheppard. After establishing a beachhead within Nod's territory in Eastern Europe, GDI focus on controlling Poland and Belarus and removing troops from occupied lands in Germany. However, Kane uses media manipulation to convince the world that GDI deliberately attacked and massacred the citizens of the Polish city of Białystok. Although Sheppard denies GDI's involvement, the UN cuts funding to the military outfit, forcing GDI to mount defensive operations against a sudden surge of Nod attacks, including protecting bases and leading Tiberium scientist Dr. Ignatio Mobius. However, Nod soon finds themselves on the defensive upon learning that it was a ruse designed by Sheppard and the UN to lure them into a false sense of security, with new funding allowing GDI to bring forth new combat units to help in battle. Eventually GDI locates Kane's main base of operation at a complex called the Temple of Nod in Sarajevo, Bosnia, with Sheppard ordering the commander to launch a final assault to defeat him. GDI succeeds, with the complex destroyed by GDI's superweapon, the space-based Ion Cannon, ending the conflict, though leaving some experts to question if Nod will cease operating.

=== Nod campaign ===
With Nod engaged in open warfare across the globe, Kane gives orders for his forces to secure territory in Africa, with his second-in-command Seth assigning the player, a new recruit, to assist in the Brotherhood's operations. After a number of successful operations in Northern Africa, a jealous Seth attempts to send the recruit on a suicide mission to attack the Pentagon in the United States, but is executed by Kane for initiating a rogue operation. Upon combating the chaos Seth created, and countering GDI's efforts to re-establish themselves in Northern Africa, Kane assigns his recruit to lead the charge in securing the rest of the continent, eventually culminating in them establishing a Temple of Nod in South Africa and securing control of GDI's Ion Cannon. With the cannon secured, Kane declares victory in Africa, and makes plans to achieve the same in Europe, allowing the recruit to use the cannon to destroy one of four historical landmarks with the hijacked Ion Cannon – the White House, the British Houses of Parliament, the Eiffel Tower, or the Brandenburg Gate – thus shattering GDI's public image.

=== Connection to Command & Conquer: Red Alert ===
Command & Conquer: Red Alert was intended to be a prequel to Command & Conquer, and both the Allied and Soviet campaigns contain references to Command & Conquer. In particular, some of the Soviet mission briefings feature Kane, while one of the cutscenes in the Allied campaign directly foreshadows the creation of GDI. Also in the Soviet final cutscene, Nadia says "this temporary chaos in Europe will only help to fuel the Brotherhood's cause", mentions "the land of Nod", and states that "the Brotherhood will tire of the USSR in the early 1990s". However, Command & Conquer has the Brotherhood of Nod start out as an underground terrorist organisation initially operating out of the African continent, not as a major political force in control of the late Soviet empire. Furthermore, the Soviet Union is shown on world maps to no longer exist at the time, with the Russian Federation being shown as a member of GDI. With the release of Command & Conquer: Red Alert 2, a hotly debated topic which arose among fans was whether Command & Conquer follows the conclusion of the Allied or Soviet storyline, with evidence existing for both sides of the debate. Former C&C designer Adam Isgreen confirmed that Tiberian Dawn in fact follows on the conclusion of Red Alert's Allies campaign, while Red Alert 2 and Yuri's Revenge take place in a second parallel universe, created by a new attempt to alter history in "Tiberian Incursion", the working title of Westwood Studios' cancelled version of Command & Conquer 3. The exact relationship between the events of the two games remains unclear, and their connection was later disregarded by Electronic Arts, who preferred to treat the Tiberium and Red Alert series as completely separate universes.

== Development ==
Westwood Studios began developing Command & Conquer in early 1993, after conceiving the game near the end of Dune II’s development. The team sought to build on the foundation laid by their earlier game, and Westwood co-founder Brett Sperry later said that "Command & Conquer was the net result of the Dune II wish list". Following the success of Dune II, Sperry believed that "it was time to build the ultimate RTS" with an original intellectual property. He later said that he was "fanatical about calling the game 'Command & Conquer'" because he believed that the title was an ideal summary of the gameplay. The drag-selecting and context sensitive clicking was inspired by Apple's way of navigating on the desktop.

Command & Conquer originally took place in a high fantasy world before being redesigned. The team changed to a modern warfare setting because of the political climate of the mid-1990s, and they later cited the Gulf War as a key influence in this decision. Westwood co-founder Louis Castle said that "war was in the news and the threat of terrorism was on everyone's mind". The setting was further influenced by Sperry's belief that future wars would not be "nation-to-nation", but would rather be "fought between Western society and a kind of anarchistic terror organization that doesn't have a centralized government". The team sought to make the player feel like their computer was "a terminal to a real battlefield", going so far as to make the installation process resemble hacking a "military infrastructure". However, Castle noted that the team "created a parallel universe to avoid dealing with the sobering issues of a real war".

In a retrospective, Paul Mallinson of Computer & Video Games (CVG) wrote that the game's production was "speedy, focused and fun". Castle said that, because the company was creating other titles at the time, development of Command & Conquer was not a "working party", but lead programmer Joe Bostic later said that it was "so much fun that I would sometimes marvel that I actually got paid as well". The game's playtesters were enthusiastic about the game during development, which Castle later said had encouraged the team to work harder. The team created live-action FMV cutscenes for the game. These cutscenes contain no professional actors aside from Eric Alan Martin, a Las Vegas actor playing GDI General Mark Sheppard, and Kucan, who played Kane and was heavily involved in their production. The cast is made up of Westwood team members, and a low budget meant that filming took place in "spare rooms" and warehouses. Castle later said that the team "had no illusions that we were as good as TV or film", but that the cutscenes were not intentionally campy. He credited Kucan with "taking [a] ragtag group of people who had no business in front of a camera and making something reasonably good". To replace the spice from Dune II, the team introduced Tiberium, which was inspired by the 1957 B-movie The Monolith Monsters. Castle said that the team's goal in both cases was to create "a central resource that everybody was fighting over". As with Dune II, the soundtrack was composed by Frank Klepacki.

To create the game's landscapes, the artists took digitized photographs of real world terrain and manipulated them with rendering techniques.

== Release ==
The game was released for DOS in 1995. In 1996, the game received a Windows 95 re-release titled Command & Conquer: Gold (also known as C&C 95), featuring SVGA visuals. A port for the Macintosh was released in 1996, with the Sony PlayStation and Sega Saturn versions following in 1996–97, and the Nintendo 64 version arriving on June 29, 1999. Due to a deal between Virgin Interactive Entertainment and Sega, the console version was a Saturn exclusive until 1997. In 2007, Command & Conquer was released as a free download by Electronic Arts. The game's PlayStation version was later released on the PlayStation Network in Europe.

In 1996, Westwood released an expansion pack The Covert Operations, adding 15 new missions, and unlocking an easter egg mini-campaign involving dinosaurs. A spin-off game titled Command & Conquer: Sole Survivor focuses entirely on online multiplayer, putting the players in control of single units in modes such as deathmatch and capture the flag.

In 2008, an unofficial patch was released to keep C&C working on both 32 and 64 bit versions of Windows XP and higher. The patch fixes several bugs in the game, and adds upgrades like higher resolution and support for language packs.

A 3DO Interactive Multiplayer version of C&C was announced to be in development, but this port was never released.

A remastered version of Command & Conquer (along with its expansion packs) and its prequel, Red Alert, was done by Petroglyph Games. The Command & Conquer Remastered Collection was released on June 5, 2020.

== Reception ==
=== Sales ===
Command & Conquer was a commercial hit. In the United States, PC Data declared it the fourth-best-selling CD-ROM product across all categories for October 1995, and #7 in the computer game category the following month. It was absent from December's top 10 in the country.

By April 1996, Command & Conquer had sold 500,000 copies worldwide, and Westwood Studios reported sales above 1 million units by September of that year. Domestically, the game was the seventh-best-selling computer game for the first half of 1996. The game was particularly popular in France and Germany, and sold 200,000 copies in the latter country by November 1996. Sales across all platforms reached 1.7 million units by February 1997, and the game went on to sell more than three million.

=== Critical reviews ===
Reception

Aggregate scores
Aggregator	Score
GameRankings	(SSAT) 90% (PS) 87% (N64) 78%
Metacritic	(PC) 94/100

Review scores
Publication	Score
Computer Games Magazine	5/5
Computer Gaming World	4/5
Electronic Gaming Monthly	(SSAT/PS) 8.875/10
GameSpot	(PC) 9.3/10 (SSAT) 9.2/10 (PS) 8.2/10 (N64) 7.6/10
Next Generation	(PC) 5/5 (SSAT) 4/5
PC Gamer (US)	91%
PC PowerPlay	80%
PCMag	4/4
Entertainment Weekly	A−
Macworld	7.8
Computer Game Review	97/92/93
Sega Saturn Magazine	(SSAT) 94%
MacUser	4.5/5

Critical reception of Command & Conquer was highly positive. It was named the best strategy game of 1995 by PC Gamer US and—tied with Heroes of Might and Magic: A Strategic Quest—Computer Gaming World, and the year's top real-time strategy title and overall "Game of the Year" by Computer Games Strategy Plus. In 1998, Command & Conquer Gold received nominations for "Computer Entertainment Title of the Year" and "PC Strategy Game of the Year" during the AIAS' inaugural Interactive Achievement Awards.

Entertainment Weekly's Bob Strauss offered the game effusive praise, writing: "If you liked playing with toy soldiers as a kid, you'll think you've stepped on a land mine and gone to heaven". Strauss believed that its cutscenes, voice clips and "nonstop action" served to "[enliven] the usually stodgy war game genre". After highlighting its multiplayer and citing its installation process as "the coolest [...] I've ever seen", he concluded that the game "makes other war simulations look as flat as Risk". A reviewer for Next Generation called it "a game that any strategy fan has to pick up". While complaining at the lack of a high-resolution mode, he applauded the gameplay for its combination of simple and intuitive control with deep and complex strategy, and said the full motion video cutscenes add considerably to the game's depth. He also complimented the soundtrack and fast pace. Peter Smith of Computer Games Magazine called Command & Conquer "an adrenaline rush in a box", writing: "Everything about this game shouts quality". Smith lauded the game's music and sound effects, gameplay and story, and even its install program. Smith noted some minor problems, citing issues with the game's artificial intelligence, but finished by saying that "Westwood has really raised the bar with this one". Chris Hudak of GameSpot wrote: "Starting from the load-screens and straight on 'til morning, Command & Conquer is one of the finest, most brilliantly-designed computer games I have ever seen".

Martin E. Cirulis of Computer Gaming World wrote that Command & Conquer "remains mainly a good, networkable version of Dune II". Cirulis found the game's interface intuitive and described its online component as "sophisticated and easy-to-use", also praising its story for being "as interesting as the actual tactics and gunfire", and commented that he "would buy C&C2 just to see where things are going to end up". However, according to him, the developers failed "to correct major shortcomings" in Dune II, as its fog of war does not fit with the real-world setting, also finding fault with design choices in the game's missions, which he believed were structured like "puzzles" that allowed for only one way to win. Nevertheless, he concluded that it remained "the best-looking and sounding strategy game yet" despite its flaws, and that it was "more than entertaining enough to make up for its shortcomings". Writing for PC Gamer US, T. Liam McDonald wrote that the game "has all the playability of Dune II, but with more diverse units, more unusual scenarios, and impressively executed wraparound cutscenes". McDonald called its combat a "satisfying blend of action and strategy", and noted that this, combined with an attention to "little details", made the game a "success", also praising its cutscenes as "terrifically executed". Although he was disappointed that the game lacked "fancier terrain or another zoom level", McDonald concluded: "This game is a whole lot of fun, so get it, play it, and love it like your own child". "Command & Conquer is an enthralling game", Bernard H. Yee of PC Magazine said, with "relentless and crafty" AI and very good Windows 95 compatibility.

==== Ports ====
The Electronic Gaming Monthly review team gave the Saturn version their "Game of the Month" award, citing the excellent translation of the PC version, accessible gameplay, and numerous strategic options, though they criticized that the soldier graphics are too small. All four of them gave identical scores to the PlayStation version, though they noted it had marginally exceeded the Saturn version by including additional missions. Rich Leadbetter of Sega Saturn Magazine also praised the game's accessibility, as well as the mission design, effective point-and-click control with the gamepad, and strong AI for both enemy and allied troops. On other side, he said the game could have been done on the Sega CD, and objected to the omission of the PC version's multiplayer mode, contending that had it been included Command & Conquer would have been one of the Saturn's best games. Major Mike reviewed both the Saturn and PlayStation versions in the same issue of GamePro. He described them as largely the same, and said they both suffer from inaccurate cursor movement, but recommended them for their strong gameplay, sound effects, and graphics, especially the full motion video. Next Generation deemed the Saturn version "the triumphant high point of [the] real-time strategy genre for home consoles". Like Leadbetter, the reviewer highly criticized the removal of multiplayer support, but argued that the lowered graphics resolution would only be noticeable to players of the PC version, and identified the remixed redbook soundtrack and added transparencies as improvements over the PC version. Reviewing Command & Conquer’s Sega Saturn port, Next Generation Online commented that it did little to improve the core game, and noted its lower resolution and missing multiplayer functionality as significant negatives, but the review still called it one of the console's best games and a "must-buy for Saturn owners". CVG’s Kim Randell wrote that the Saturn version is "up there with AM2's finest games" and "a joy to play", as it "thrives on deceptively simple gameplay" despite its unimpressive graphics and sound, and adding that the later missions are "masterpieces of gaming design". Randell believed that the port's missing multiplayer mode would have made it as good as Virtua Fighter 2 and NiGHTS Into Dreams, but that it "isn't far off this realm of excellence" without it.

Game Informer's three reviewers praised the Saturn and PlayStation ports of Command & Conquer. While the magazine's Andy McNamara wrote that "the best way to play C&C is on the PC", he called the console version a "fantastic port" marred only by "rather clumsy" controls and the inability to save in the middle of a mission. Andrew Reiner agreed, calling it a "flawless PC port" that "perfectly" recreates the thrills of the original, but he was displeased that it did not feature multiplayer support. Jon Storm summarized it as "an excellent addition to any PlayStation or Saturn library". Glenn Rubenstein noted in his review that the score he was giving the Saturn version was the highest GameSpot had yet given to any console game, even exceeding Super Mario 64 and Tomb Raider. He said the game had converted well to Saturn, and in particular contested the way other critics counted the omission of multiplayer against it, saying that such a feature was beyond the console's capabilities. He concluded: "With its mix of in-depth strategy, tactical action, and slick storytelling, Command & Conquer brings console strategy games out of the shadow they've lived in for so long". Though he noted the PlayStation version had the advantage of additional missions, he held it to be slightly inferior to the Saturn version due to the faster speed at which it plays. He also criticized the lack of multiplayer, noting that the PlayStation Link Cable could have been used (apparently unaware that a similar link cable was available for the Saturn). A reviewer for Next Generation wrote: "Just like the ported Saturn version, PSX [PlayStation] C&C adds little to the existing game". The review's author cited the lower resolution and lack of multiplayer as low points, but noted that the addition of the Covert Operations missions "adds to the overall replay value".

Reviewing the Nintendo 64 version of Command & Conquer, Erik Reppen of Game Informer wrote that it "has done an amazing job of completely reworking the old levels into a 3D polygonal format". Although he said that the game "offers plenty to keep you entertained", he disliked the heavy sound compression and the loss of the FMV cutscenes present in earlier versions. IGN's Aaron Boulding opened his review by saying: "To their credit, Looking Glass developed Command & Conquer with all of the elements you want from a quality RTS". Boulding praised the gameplay and the Special Ops missions, but noted that most of the units were distinct from the PC version. He was less happy with the port's graphics, calling them "hit and miss", though he lauded the audio effects and voice work. Boulding also said the controls were well handled, though a bit complicated, and concluded: "Command & Conquer is a fine game and may get a little addictive for anyone who never got into the PC version of the game. But for anyone who ran through the old version, the N64 won't offer much in the way of new thrills beyond the new N64 missions and the 3D world".

Next Generation commented that, while earlier ports had trouble recreating the mouse controls of the original, the Nintendo 64 version "handles it beautifully". The review's author stated that the controller's analog stick "allow[s for] the same simple point and click interface as the PC", adding that "the entire interface is equally responsive and well planned". The reviewer praised its graphics and audio, even calling the voice acting "the most competent [...] ever to appear en masse on the platform", but disliked its lack of multiplayer support, and concluded that the port "keeps the spirit of the game perfectly while adapting it wonderfully to the limitations of the N64". James Bottorff of The Cincinnati Enquirer believed that advancements in the real-time strategy genre rendered the Nintendo 64 port outdated, despite its new "bells and whistles". However, Bottorff wrote that those who had not played earlier Command & Conquer releases would find it "highly addictive", adding that its "controls are surprisingly good for a PC port".

== Legacy ==
Command & Conquer spawned the Command & Conquer franchise, which sold 30 million copies in total by November 2009. The story of the game continued in the Tiberian series, including an action title Command & Conquer: Renegade that revisits the original game's First Tiberium War. In 1996, Westwood launched the prequel series Red Alert, telling the story of a global conflict between the Western nations and the Soviet Union which took place instead of World War II.

The game has also been cited as a large influence on the real-time strategy genre overall. In 1996, Computer Gaming World ranked Command & Conquer as the 48th best game of all time, opining that despite being not "as complete a design as Warcraft II", the game set "a new standard for great multiplayer play". That same year, Next Generation ranked it as the 49th top game of all time for how "it brought war gaming out of prehistoric, hexagonal mire and made it cool". CVG’s Mallinson wrote in 2002 that "hundreds of other strategy games", from StarCraft to Age of Empires, had borrowed concepts from Command & Conquer and "the RTS genre is still thriving, and that is all thanks to Command & Conquer". Bruce Geryk of GameSpot commented that "the name [Command & Conquer] is nearly synonymous with RTS gaming"; and GameSpy's Mark Walker wrote that "Warcraft and Dune II were little more than warm up acts" for Command & Conquer, which "blew open the genre", and credited the title with popularizing real-time strategy games in the years following its release. Dan Adams of IGN wrote that the game, alongside Warcraft: Orcs & Humans, "cemented the popularity" of the real-time strategy genre in the wake of Dune II. Polish web portal Wirtualna Polska ranked it as the seventh most addictive game "that stole our childhood".

Command & Conquer was named one of the top 100 CD-ROMs by PC Magazine.

== Open source ==
Paired with the release of Command & Conquer Remastered Collection in 2020, Electronic Arts released the source code for the remastered versions of Tiberian Dawn and Red Alert through GitHub under the GNU General Public License in collaboration between EA and the Command & Conquer community to aid in the development of mods. The source release has also allowed community developers to produce source ports of the original PC version of the game which was released as freeware. This now includes unofficial ports to platforms such as the PlayStation Vita and Nintendo DS derived from an upstream project called Vanilla-Conquer. EA open-sourced the original Command & Conquer in February 2025.
