= Danger Close Games =

American video game developer

- Final Logo used from 2010 to 2013
- Formerly: DreamWorks Interactive LLC (1995–2000); EA Los Angeles (2000–2010)
- Type: Subsidiary
- Industry: Video games
- Founded: March 22, 1995; 31 years ago in Los Angeles and Redmond, Washington
- Founders: Alan Hartman; Glenn Entis; John A. S. Skeel
- Defunct: January 30, 2013; 13 years ago
- Fate: Dissolved
- Successor: Ripple Effect Studios
- Headquarters: Playa Vista, Los Angeles, US
- Key people: Bobby Moldavon (studio manager); Greg Goodrich (executive producer)
- Products: See § Games
- Number of employees: 75 (1995)
- Parent: DreamWorks SKG (50%, 1995–2000); Microsoft Games (50%, 1995–2000); Electronic Arts (2000–2013)

Danger Close Games (formerly DreamWorks Interactive LLC and EA Los Angeles) was an American video game developer based in Los Angeles. The company was founded on March 22, 1995, as joint venture between DreamWorks SKG and Microsoft (later moved to Microsoft Games) under the name DreamWorks Interactive, with studios in Redmond, Washington, and Los Angeles.

In February 2000, the Los Angeles studio of DreamWorks Interactive was acquired by Electronic Arts and renamed EA Los Angeles, and to Danger Close Games in 2010. The studio's sole responsibility after 2010 was to develop games in the Medal of Honor franchise. When the series was put on hold in January 2013, Danger Close was shut down, with some staff moving on to DICE LA (now Ripple Effect Studios), a Los Angeles studio of DICE, another subsidiary of Electronic Arts.

== History ==
=== As DreamWorks Interactive (1995–2000) ===
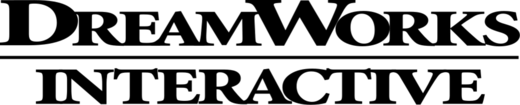
Former logo as DreamWorks Interactive, used from 1995 to 2000

DreamWorks SKG and Microsoft announced on March 22, 1995, that they were establishing a videogame development company, DreamWorks Interactive LLC, as a joint venture following a Microsoft investment that acquired a minority stake in DreamWorks SKG as a whole. The studio's operations were to be set up in Los Angeles, California, with a smaller group near Microsoft headquarters in Redmond, Washington. Both Microsoft and DreamWorks initially invested $30 million in the studio, which would soon be employing 75 people.

Steven Spielberg was primarily responsible for negotiations with Microsoft to establish DreamWorks Interactive, which secured funding for the studio. To manage DreamWorks Interactive, Microsoft relocated one of its executive game producers, Alan Hartman, while film industry veteran Glenn Entis served as the studio's CEO following DreamWorks' acquisition of Pacific Data Images. John A. S. Skeel, one of the founders of DreamWorks Interactive, led the Redmond studio, primarily responsible for publishing games developed by independent studios. DreamWorks Interactive was intended to gradually develop synergies with the television and film divisions of DreamWorks, which still hadn't released content yet in 1995. In an April 1995 interview, DreamWorks co-founder David Geffen also speculated that the music division of DreamWorks could possibly find synergies with DreamWorks Interactive, saying "we don't really know what the effect of interactivity will be on music."

On June 1, 1995, DreamWorks SKG and Silicon Graphics formed a $50 million agreement to create a new computer animation system using hardware and software. Initially focused on the movie industry, the alliance between the companies was also connected with the creation of DreamWorks Interactive, which, adding to Microsoft's financing and technologies, would also be used in video games. On March 25, 1997, the company signed a distribution deal with Electronic Arts.

According to Leslie Helm of the Los Angeles Times, the company's initial computer game titles were relatively unsuccessful. Its biggest hit by August 1997 was Goosebumps: Escape from Horrorland, with sales of 130,000 units, according to PC Data. Helm called this "a modest success". In 1996, Microsoft moved DreamWorks SKG art director Matt Hall to DreamWorks Interactive with the goal of creating a new first-person shooter game franchise based on the Spielberg concept.

In 1999, the studio saw its most successful release with first-person shooter video game Medal of Honor, published by Electronic Arts on October 31, 1999, for PlayStation. Medal of Honor laid the groundwork for historic war-based combat games, ultimately leading to Activision's Call of Duty series. However, the studio's reputation had been hampered by the 1998 release of Trespasser, a game based on the Jurassic Park franchise. Trespasser had numerous technical flaws in attempting to create a realistic physics engine, and introduced mechanics that were considered awkward at the time of its release, such as the player having separate control of the player-character's limbs. The title sold only 50,000 units and is considered one of the worst video games of all time, and left Steven Spielberg, one of the owners of DreamWorks, in doubt about continuing a video game company.

=== Under Electronic Arts (2000–2013) ===
With DreamWorks losing interest in maintaining a video game division, Electronic Arts acquired the Los Angeles studio of DreamWorks Interactive from DreamWorks and Microsoft on February 24, 2000, acquiring the intellectual property and rights of the acclaimed series Medal of Honor from Microsoft/DreamWorks. Analysts at The Wall Street Journal estimate the purchase cost around $10 million. The company was renamed EA Los Angeles and focused on developing titles in the Medal of Honor series, releasing Medal of Honor: Underground the same year. On August 6, 2003, EA Los Angeles moved from their offices in Bel Air to a new campus in Playa Vista. On that campus, the studio was merged with EA Pacific in 2003, and received some employees from previously closed Westwood Studios, leading EA Los Angeles to start working in the Command & Conquer series.

The Redmond studio's operations were consolidated within Microsoft, which at the time was founding its own in-house video game division, Microsoft Games. As a result, DreamWorks Interactive head Alan Hartman became Digital Anvil's head of studio, with remaining DWI Redmond employees moving to the newly founded Turn 10 Studios.

In July 2010, EA Los Angeles was rebranded to Danger Close Games to focus on the development of Medal of Honor games. With the rebranding referencing a term from the Medal of Honor series, the studio would exclusively focus on the Medal of Honor games. Their first project was the 2010 Medal of Honor, which was released for Microsoft Windows, PlayStation 3, and Xbox 360 on October 12, 2010. A follow-up, Medal of Honor: Warfighter, was released on October 23, 2012. In January 2013, Electronic Arts announced that the Medal of Honor series was taken 'out of rotation' and put on hold, following to the poor reception received by Warfighter. With this move, Danger Close was effectively closed; some developers moved to other EA studios, while others left the Los Angeles area. Some senior staff of Danger Close formed the groundwork for DICE LA, a sub-studio of EA DICE, which was formed in May 2013.

== Games ==
=== As DreamWorks Interactive ===
Year	Title	Platforms	Developer	Publisher
1996	Someone's in the Kitchen!	Microsoft Windows	DreamWorks Interactive	DreamWorks Interactive
1996	Steven Spielberg's Director's Chair	Microsoft Windows	Knowledge Adventure	Knowledge Adventure
1996	Goosebumps: Escape from Horrorland	Microsoft Windows	DreamWorks Interactive	DreamWorks Interactive
1996	The Neverhood	Microsoft Windows	The Neverhood, Inc.	DreamWorks Interactive
1997	Chaos Island: The Lost World	Microsoft Windows	DreamWorks Interactive	DreamWorks Interactive
1997	Goosebumps: Attack of the Mutant	Microsoft Windows	BluSky Software	DreamWorks Interactive
1997	Dilbert's Desktop Games	Microsoft Windows	Cyclops Software	DreamWorks Interactive
1997	The Lost World: Jurassic Park	PlayStation	DreamWorks Interactive	Electronic Arts
1998	Skullmonkeys	PlayStation	The Neverhood, Inc.	Electronic Arts
1998	Small Soldiers	PlayStation	DreamWorks Interactive	Electronic Arts
1998	Small Soldiers: Squad Commander	Microsoft Windows	DreamWorks Interactive	Hasbro Interactive
1998	Trespasser	Microsoft Windows	DreamWorks Interactive	Electronic Arts
1999	BoomBots	PlayStation	The Neverhood, Inc.	SouthPeak Interactive
1999	T'ai Fu: Wrath of the Tiger	PlayStation	DreamWorks Interactive	Activision
1999	Warpath: Jurassic Park	PlayStation	DreamWorks Interactive	Electronic Arts
1999	Medal of Honor	PlayStation	DreamWorks Interactive	Electronic Arts
2000	Medal of Honor: Underground	PlayStation	DreamWorks Interactive	Electronic Arts

=== As EA Los Angeles ===
Year	Title	Platforms	Developer	Publisher
2001	Clive Barker's Undying	macOS, Microsoft Windows	EA Los Angeles	Electronic Arts
2002	Medal of Honor: Frontline	GameCube, PlayStation 2, Xbox	EA Los Angeles	Electronic Arts
2003	Command & Conquer: Generals – Zero Hour	macOS, Microsoft Windows	EA Los Angeles	Electronic Arts
2003	Medal of Honor: Rising Sun	GameCube, PlayStation 2, Xbox	EA Los Angeles	Electronic Arts
2004	GoldenEye: Rogue Agent	GameCube, PlayStation 2, Xbox	EA Los Angeles	Electronic Arts
2004	Medal of Honor: Pacific Assault	Microsoft Windows	EA Los Angeles	Electronic Arts
2004	The Lord of the Rings: The Battle for Middle-earth	Microsoft Windows	EA Los Angeles	Electronic Arts
2005	Medal of Honor: European Assault	GameCube, PlayStation 2, Xbox	EA Los Angeles	Electronic Arts
2006	The Lord of the Rings: The Battle for Middle-earth II	Microsoft Windows, Xbox 360	EA Los Angeles	Electronic Arts
2006	The Lord of the Rings: The Battle for Middle-earth II: The Rise of the Witch-king	Microsoft Windows	EA Los Angeles	Electronic Arts
2007	Command & Conquer 3: Tiberium Wars	macOS, Microsoft Windows, Xbox 360	EA Los Angeles	Electronic Arts
2007	Medal of Honor: Vanguard	PlayStation 2, Wii	EA Los Angeles	Electronic Arts
2007	Medal of Honor: Airborne	Microsoft Windows, PlayStation 3, Xbox 360	EA Los Angeles	Electronic Arts
2007	Medal of Honor: Heroes 2	PlayStation Portable, Wii	EA Los Angeles	Electronic Arts
2008	Boom Blox	Wii	EA Los Angeles	Electronic Arts
2008	Command & Conquer 3: Kane's Wrath	Microsoft Windows, Xbox 360	EA Los Angeles	Electronic Arts
2008	Command & Conquer: Red Alert 3	macOS, Microsoft Windows, PlayStation 3, Xbox 360	EA Los Angeles	Electronic Arts
2009	Boom Blox Bash Party	Wii	EA Los Angeles	Electronic Arts
2009	Command & Conquer: Red Alert 3 – Uprising	Microsoft Windows, PlayStation 3, Xbox 360	EA Los Angeles	Electronic Arts
2010	Command & Conquer 4: Tiberian Twilight	Microsoft Windows	EA Los Angeles	Electronic Arts

=== As Danger Close Games ===
Year	Title	Platforms	Developer	Publisher
2010	Medal of Honor	Microsoft Windows, PlayStation 3, Xbox 360	Danger Close Games	Electronic Arts
2012	Medal of Honor: Warfighter	Microsoft Windows, PlayStation 3, Xbox 360	Danger Close Games	Electronic Arts
