= Command & Conquer: Red Alert 3 =

2008 video game

- Developer: EA Los Angeles
- Publisher: Electronic Arts
- Producer: Amer Ajami
- Designer: Jasen Torres
- Programmer: Austin Ellis
- Artists: Matt J. Britton; Adam McCarthy
- Writer: Mical Pedriana
- Composers: James Hannigan; Frank Klepacki; Timothy Michael Wynn
- Series: Command & Conquer: Red Alert
- Engine: SAGE 2.0
- Platforms: Microsoft Windows; Xbox 360; PlayStation 3; Mac OS X
- Release: Microsoft Windows: NA: October 28, 2008; EU: October 31, 2008; Xbox 360: NA: November 11, 2008; EU: November 14, 2008; PlayStation 3: NA: March 23, 2009; EU: March 27, 2009; Mac OS X: NA: March 2009
- Genre: Real-time strategy
- Modes: Single-player, multiplayer

Command & Conquer: Red Alert 3 is a real-time strategy video game developed by EA Los Angeles and published by Electronic Arts. It was released in October 2008 in the United States and Europe for Microsoft Windows. An Xbox 360 version was released on November 11. In addition, Command & Conquer: Red Alert 3 – Ultimate Edition, the PlayStation 3 version (which contains additional material), was released on March 23, 2009, along with the Mac OS X version by TransGaming.

Additionally, the game can be purchased from the Xbox digital store and played on Xbox One and Xbox Series consoles through the Xbox backwards compatibility program.

The game is a continuation of the Red Alert games within the Command & Conquer series. Command & Conquer: Red Alert 3 – Uprising, a stand-alone expansion pack, was released for Microsoft Windows in March 2009. It was offered via digital distribution.

Like the previous entries in the Red Alert series, the game is set in an alternate reality from World War II, in which the Western Allies fight the Soviet Union. In Red Alert 3 the Soviet leadership, facing defeat, goes back in time to kill Albert Einstein and prevent his assistance to the Allies, paving the way for Soviet domination in the present. However, as an unintended consequence, a third world power, the Empire of the Rising Sun (also known as the Japanese Empire), is created and all three sides go to war. The three factions are playable, with the gameplay involving constructing building and factories, gathering resources and training armies to defeat other players. Each faction has a fully co-operative campaign, playable with either an artificial intelligence partner or with another player online. The game intersperses strategy missions with full motion video footage featuring an ensemble cast starring J. K. Simmons, Tim Curry and George Takei as the leaders of the three factions.

The game received mostly positive reviews, with reviewers citing the co-operative and multiplayer components as strengths, along with the enhanced role of naval combat compared to other real-time strategy games. Commonly cited weaknesses included aspects such as unit pathfinding and an unstable netcode.

== Gameplay ==
Almost all structures can now be built offshore, out of reach of some enemy units – and in reach of others.

Red Alert 3 retains the core real-time strategy mechanics of the Command & Conquer series. Warring factions harvest resources using vulnerable collectors and use those resources to construct military bases and forces on-site. Structures form a shallow but wide tech tree with a variety of units and elusive superweapons. Weapon types are specialized to the point where a rifleman can withstand direct hits from an anti-tank cannon. Red Alert 3's major refinements are the addition of the Empire of the Rising Sun to the factions of the sub-series, a co-operative campaign, and expanded naval warfare.

The single-player campaign is fully co-operative. Each mission is played alongside an ally. These can be played online, with another player. Offline it is one of several computer-controlled characters. Teams share income and generally start with the same forces. Computerized characters can be given simple commands, such as an order to take a specific position or to strike a specific target. The campaign has nine missions for each side. Each side's plotlines are mutually exclusive.

Naval warfare is emphasized as another front. Executive producer Chris Corry has stated that many units are amphibious, trading effectiveness for increased flexibility. Buildings and entire bases can be constructed on water, save for such things as ground or naval unit production facilities (e.g. tank factories are ground-only, but tsunami tanks are amphibious and can be produced in Naval Yards), and players who "ignore the ocean [are] likely forfeiting a significant part of their potential economy to their opponents". Further stressing this is the fact that, despite some campaign maps being entirely land based, all multiplayer maps have significant bodies of water in them. The use of naval units and various unit abilities also helped players counterattack their opponent's units specific to that unit's strongpoint.

Almost every unit in the game has a secondary ability. Their usage varies: some are toggled on or off, others are targeted, and still others are triggered the instant one presses the button. The Imperial King Oni can bull-rush enemy units as a secondary ability, a Soviet Hammer Tank can toggle between a tank gun and a laser beam that can leech HP from enemies, and an Allied Athena Cannon can engage its energy shields with a button press but with a cooldown period before they can be used again. All abilities are bound to the same key. The game also features experience points that are used to upgrade unit types and to buy "commander abilities", which call in air strikes, recon sweeps, magnetic satellite beams, etc. Commander abilities have no resource costs but do have significant cooldown periods.

Ore fields as resource sites have been removed. These originated in the first Red Alert as a functionally identical equivalent to Tiberium, and what were ostensibly strip mines had ore growing out of the ground. Gameplay mechanics have not changed a great deal since fields have been replaced with stationary ore mines. Strategic ore refinery placement and covert refining are impacted to an extent.

=== Design ===
The first Red Alert revolved around a different World War II between the Allies (including Germany) and the Soviet Union, with some high-tech esoterica, such as weaponized tesla coils linked to Tesla's abortive death rays and limited time travel linked to the rumored Philadelphia Experiment. Red Alert 2 featured a Soviet invasion of North America with tanks, conscripts, gargantuan airships, and psychically dominated anti-ship giant squids; its expansion, Yuri's Revenge, escalated matters up to UFOs and Soviets on the Moon. Executive producer Chris Corry stated in a pre-release interview that Red Alert 3 further differentiates the playable factions from each other and "[play] up the silliness in their faction design whenever possible".

The Soviets and Allies have a mix of old and new features. Soviet units lean towards ruthlessness and brute force: giant Kirov airships are retained and flak troopers are now penal troops, while attack dogs are an Allied unit that the Soviets have replaced with functionally identical armored war bears. New units include heavy tanks known as "Hammer Tanks" that can tear weapons from the enemies they destroy with a magnetic beam, light anti-infantry walkers known as "Sickles" that can jump over terrain elevations, the amphibious "Stingray" attack craft with twin-mounted tesla coils, and amphibious AA-only "Bullfrog" transports that can only shoot their passengers out of a "man cannon". The Soviets have lost their nuclear technology due to the events of the backstory, but can leverage their simple tech, cheap units and "quick fix" structures like the Super Reactor and Crusher Crane, enabling them to easily overwhelm enemy bases. Soviet armour are considerably tougher than Allied and Japanese on the whole, and augmented with their infamous Iron Curtain, can be extremely dangerous.

A major change from Red Alert 2 is the Soviet Air Force: in addition to Kirovs, the Soviets have access to MiG ("Mikevich and Guroyan", a play on the real-life Mikoyan and Gurevich) fighters and versatile attack helicopters. In lieu of nuclear bombs, the Soviets have developed the Vacuum Imploder, a warhead which sucks humans, vehicles and damaged buildings into a dense hole before exploding.

The Allies come with a wide variety of gadgetry (mostly nonlethal), much of it as a comeback of Red Alert 2's advanced units. New units include hydrofoils with weapon-scrambling rays, unarmed helicopters with freeze and shrink rays, and an amphibious destroyer with treads and magnetic armor that can draw enemy fire. Allied units have a variety of different accents and "good guy" overtones: their basic infantry unit is the Peacekeeper, which seems to have been derived from riot police. Red Alert 2's advanced chrono-technology has been largely but not completely lost, so that the Chronosphere superweapon remains and the returning Tanya unit is now equipped with a "time belt" that allows her to wind her location and health back a few seconds. Allied advances are driven by the FutureTech corporation in Einstein's absence. Since the tech and base building takes some time the Allies are more patience-friendly. The Allies' predominant strength is in airpower, with the best selection of aircraft available ranging from bombers to air superiority fighters. The Allies' ultimate weapon is now the Proton Collider, a cannon which fires five bolts of energy that explodes in a series of atomic-scale explosions.

The Empire of the Rising Sun has infantrymen in samurai armor with energy rifles and katanas, giant transforming mecha, ninjas, a psionic schoolgirl, and submersible planes. Several of the Empire's key units can change forms to switch from land-to-air or sea-to-air, giving them much greater versatility than Allied or Soviet units. Conversely, some of their "core units" are weaker than their counterparts, forcing the player to produce them in large numbers or use them effectively with support. Japanese naval units, however, are considerably capable, from dedicated anti-ship cruisers to heavy battleships. Their forward bases are easy to build and fully functional bases don't take much power. Their buildings also have no proximity requirements, allowing the Empire to expand its bases much more quickly and efficiently—and by extension to nab ore mines faster. Being in the altered timeline, the Japanese are now masters of psychic weaponry, not only with their commando, but with their Psionic Decimator. This ultimate weapon launches a wave of psionic energy which can easily level a base. They also have the Nanoswarm Hive, a machine that generates a stationary nanoparticle shield that prevents anything coming in or out.

The campaign mode maintains the theme of camp warfare played straight, with a secret volcano lair, android infiltrator (Empire of the Rising Sun campaign) or an anti-Soviet madman as the President of the United States, and more than one thing shooting lasers out of its eyes. It also continues the use of full motion video cutscenes featuring real-life actors. Filming started in April 2008.

=== Multiplayer ===
The game features online multiplayer, originally via GameSpy servers. Due to the shutdown of GameSpy, original Red Alert 3 online services are no longer available. A separate online solution, provided by Revora, is called C&C Online.

== Plot ==
As the Soviet Union faces defeat at the hands of the Allied Nations, Soviet General Nikolai Krukov (played by Andrew Divoff) and Colonel Anatoly Cherdenko (Tim Curry) use a time machine beneath the Kremlin to travel back to Brussels in the year 1927 at the Solvay International Physics Conference and eliminate Albert Einstein, thus changing the future. Returning to the present, they discover that Cherdenko is the Premier of the Soviet Union, much to General Krukov's chagrin; in this timeline the Soviets are on the brink of conquering Europe, when the Empire of the Rising Sun (Japanese Empire) declares war on both the Soviet Union and the Allies with a desire for complete world domination, something they perceive as their divine destiny. Due to the elimination of Einstein, nuclear weapons have not been invented and the Soviet Union is unable to stop the invasion. This begins a new Third World War, which is now a three-way war between the Soviet Union, the Allies and the Empire.

=== Soviet Union ===
In the Soviet campaign, the player assumes the role of a Soviet commander whose first task is to expel the Imperial Japanese forces from Soviet territory by defending the city of Leningrad, securing a satellite launch facility and eventually re-taking a Soviet naval base on the Pacific coastline in the city of Vladivostok.

Afterwards the Allies are rallied together by U.S. President Ackerman (J. K. Simmons), forcing the commander to lead attacks in Europe on their HQ in Geneva, and later capturing and securing a research lab in Mykonos; during these assaults, an attempt is made on Premier Cherdenko's life. The fight against the Allies in Europe culminates in a strike against the Von Esling Airbase in Iceland; during the conflict, Cherdenko names General Krukov as the traitor who tried to take his life, ordering the commander to kill him.

Next, the Soviets launch an invasion of Japan, in order to kill Emperor Yoshiro (George Takei) in his palace at Mt. Fuji. Despite an initial setback, the commander successfully defeats all three Imperial commanders and kills the emperor on board his large battle mecha, effectively eliminating the empire from the war. Dr. Gregor Zelinsky (Peter Stormare), the scientist who created the time machine, contacts the commander and tries to reveal the events that altered the past, but the communication link is abruptly cut and Zelinsky soon disappears.

The Premier orders the commander to Easter Island, to arrange a trap for the Allies, under the ruse of a peace treaty, effectively removing the Allied Military leaders from action, only for Cherdenko to finally declare that the commander has outlived his usefulness and launch a surprise attack against him; fortunately, he is defeated and killed at his volcano fortress. The Soviet commander launches a final invasion on New York City, destroying the Statue of Liberty. The war ends with the player becoming the next Premier of the unopposed Soviet Union.

=== Allies ===
In the Allied campaign, the player takes on the role of an Allied commander, who must first repel a Soviet invasion of Great Britain. Later, the Allies launch operations on the European continent, retaking Cannes and saving Allied leaders there, followed by destroying the Soviet HQ in Heidelberg, Germany. The campaign, however, leaves both sides vulnerable to the Empire of the Rising Sun, who make their move by sending a floating fortress to blockade the Allies and the Soviets from entering the North Atlantic.

This prompts a joint attempt between the Allies and the Soviets to repel the Japanese, retaking a naval base in Gibraltar and destroying the Imperial fortress in the North Sea. U.S. President Ackerman, who did not approve of such a coalition, goes rogue, and attempts to destroy Moscow with a laser superweapon hidden in Mount Rushmore. The Allied commander defeats Ackerman's forces and kills the president himself when he attempts to escape.

With the alliance secured, the coalition plans a joint attack on Tokyo to wipe out the entire Imperial Japanese military leadership with one stroke. This critical battle gets complicated when the Soviet forces fail to show up, leaving the Allied forces to fend for themselves. Despite the overwhelming odds, the commander succeeds again, wiping out the Empire's forces and vital structures required to maintain their war effort.

After the battle of Tokyo, Dr. Zelinsky defects to the Allies and informs them of the time machine he created and what the Soviets did; he also warns them of Cherdenko's secret gathering of force in Havana, Cuba, prompting the Allies to investigate further. Discovering that the Soviets have constructed secret Kirov Hangars beneath sporting arenas, the Allied commander eradicates the Soviet forces in Cuba, preventing specially modified Kirovs from leaving Cuba's airspace.

Following this, the commander and his forces are teleported to Leningrad, and ordered to bring the Soviet leaders hiding in the Peter and Paul Fortress to justice. Cherdenko and his General attempt to escape to the Moon but are captured and placed in a "cryo-prison" for life. The Vice President of the United States accepts power as the new American President in a public speech informing of Ackerman's treachery and thanks the Allied Commander for his heroic deeds.

=== Empire of the Rising Sun ===
In the Empire's campaign, the player takes on the role of a military vassal of Crown Prince Tatsu (Ron Yuan). Emperor Yoshiro's strategy involves striking at symbolic targets, such as important monuments, and employing fear to deteriorate the morale of the enemy. On the other hand, the Emperor's son, Crown Prince Tatsu, advocates direct strikes on true military targets, although his father would overrule him. The validity of the emperor's strategy however is soon challenged by the Allied full-scale attacks on Pearl Harbor at the Imperial islands of Hawaii and on one of the Empire's Floating Fortresses in the Pacific. Though both attacks are repelled and Hollywood is taken with an assault on Santa Monica supported by the Floating Fortress attacked previously, a joint Allied-Soviet task force gains a foothold in Yokohama.

Having replaced President Ackerman with an android doppelgänger, the Emperor learns of Zelinsky's defection and Cherdenko's time travel. This devastates the Emperor, as he thinks there can be no divine destiny if history can be altered. He surrenders the leadership of the Empire's military to his son. Under Prince Tatsu's command, the joint Allied-Soviet invasion of Yokohama is repelled and a full-scale attack on the Kremlin results in the deaths of Premier Cherdenko and General Krukov. Finally, the Empire invades Amsterdam, which holds the Allied Headquarters as well as FutureTech, the company responsible for much of the Allied technological advances. At the brink of defeat, Dr. Zelinsky deploys a prototype FutureTech ultraweapon that annihilates almost everything in the city, yet the remaining Imperial forces succeed in destroying what is left of the Allied and Soviet forces. Thus the war ends and the Imperial Commander is given the title of "Supreme Shogun".

== Development ==
In comparison to previous games, Red Alert 3 features a major upgrade on the naval warfare.

A third Red Alert game was unofficially announced by Electronic Arts' then executive producer and Command & Conquer lead Mark Skaggs in December 2004, shortly after the release of The Lord of the Rings: The Battle for Middle-earth. However, Mark Skaggs left Electronic Arts for reasons unspecified shortly thereafter, and there was no mention of a Red Alert 3 until February 14, 2008, by Electronic Arts.

=== Public beta testing ===
A public beta test was announced in February 2008, stating that PC users who registered a code contained in Command & Conquer 3: Kane's Wrath or Command & Conquer 3 Limited Collection by September 15 could participate in a multiplayer beta test. From July 24, people who registered their beta key started to receive an e-mail stating that the participants would start receiving their Key and Client Download link throughout late-July and August. FilePlanet members were also able to participate in the beta, with keys available on a first-come, first-served basis from August 22. The Red Alert 3 Beta servers were closed on September 29.

=== SecuROM ===
Executive producer Chris Corry said that Red Alert 3 would come bundled with the controversial SecuROM software. The game will have to be activated the first time online, but can be activated and installed only five times per serial. Note that an activation is system-targeted, users can reinstall as often as they want on one computer but activate only on five different computers. After the fifth activation, consumers will be required to contact EA Customer Service for every additional activation. He also said that uninstalling the game will not return the used installation back to the user. However, after several patches released by EA, in the released game, uninstalls do return the installation back to the user.

In the aftermath of Spore's SecuROM controversy, there was an outcry amongst some circles of customers who began threatening to boycott Red Alert 3 if this game was bundled with such digital rights management mechanisms as well. In response, EA announced that, in Red Alert 3, the activation limit would be increased from three to five activations per machine. Many customers remained unsatisfied, stating that for all intents and purposes they will be "renting" the game from EA at full price. The 1.05 patch provided users the ability to de-authorize the game in the game settings menu.

Prior to the game's release, Corry noted the longevity of other Command & Conquer titles and acknowledged that it was unlikely that authentication servers would remain online in years to come, which would prevent future users from authenticating. Corry stated that "once the game has lived its natural life and the risk for piracy has died down, we... [will] decide to decommission the authentication servers [and] we will first make a patch available that will disable copy protection from the game".

On January 8, 2009, the game became available via the Steam platform with SecuROM, but on February 19, a patch was released removing SecuROM from the game; it remains protected by the Steam DRM.

=== CD key ===
There has also been a stated issue with a "limited" number of copies of the game shipping with the last digit of the CD key missing from the manual. EA's initial response was to guess the last digit as a workaround, but this was revised shortly after this was made public, to:

If you are trying to install Command and Conquer: Red Alert 3 and the code is only 19 characters long, then it is missing the last letter or number. This was due to a misprint on a small number of manuals and we apologize for any inconvenience this has caused.

In order to get a replacement code, please click the "Contact Us" link on the left side of the page to send an e-mail to our team.

If you would like you can also contact us by phone using the number found on page 28 of your manual.

Later EA opened a page where the missing digit can be obtained without need to contact support, but a free account on the EA site is required.

=== Soundtrack ===
Composer Frank Klepacki returned to write three tracks for the game. When interviewed regarding the matter, Klepacki indicated a strong desire to contribute more, but admitted that due to the fact that he is no longer being employed by Electronic Arts and currently works for Petroglyph Games, this may be contractually impossible. At the Red Alert 3 Community Summit in June 2008, Klepacki showed a video to the Command & Conquer community in which he stated that he had been hired to work on Red Alert 3, and that he was composing "Hell March 3", the most recent update of Red Alert's iconic theme.

James Hannigan and Timothy Michael Wynn wrote the bulk of the game's remaining 114 minutes of music, with Hannigan composing the "Soviet March" menu theme along with music for the Empire of the Rising Sun faction, and Wynn the music of the Allies and the remaining Soviet tracks. Music4Games has also covered the game's music score. The band From First to Last composed several remix versions of "Hell March" and "Hell March 2", featured on the Red Alert 3 soundtrack shipped with the Red Alert 3 'Premier Edition'. A song in the soundtrack by James Hannigan is called "All Your Base Are Belong To Us", a reference to Zero Wing and the internet meme of the same name.

Wrestler Ilja Dragunov used the song "Soviet March" as his theme song on the independent wrestling scene and has continued using it since joining All Elite Wrestling in 2026.

== Marketing ==
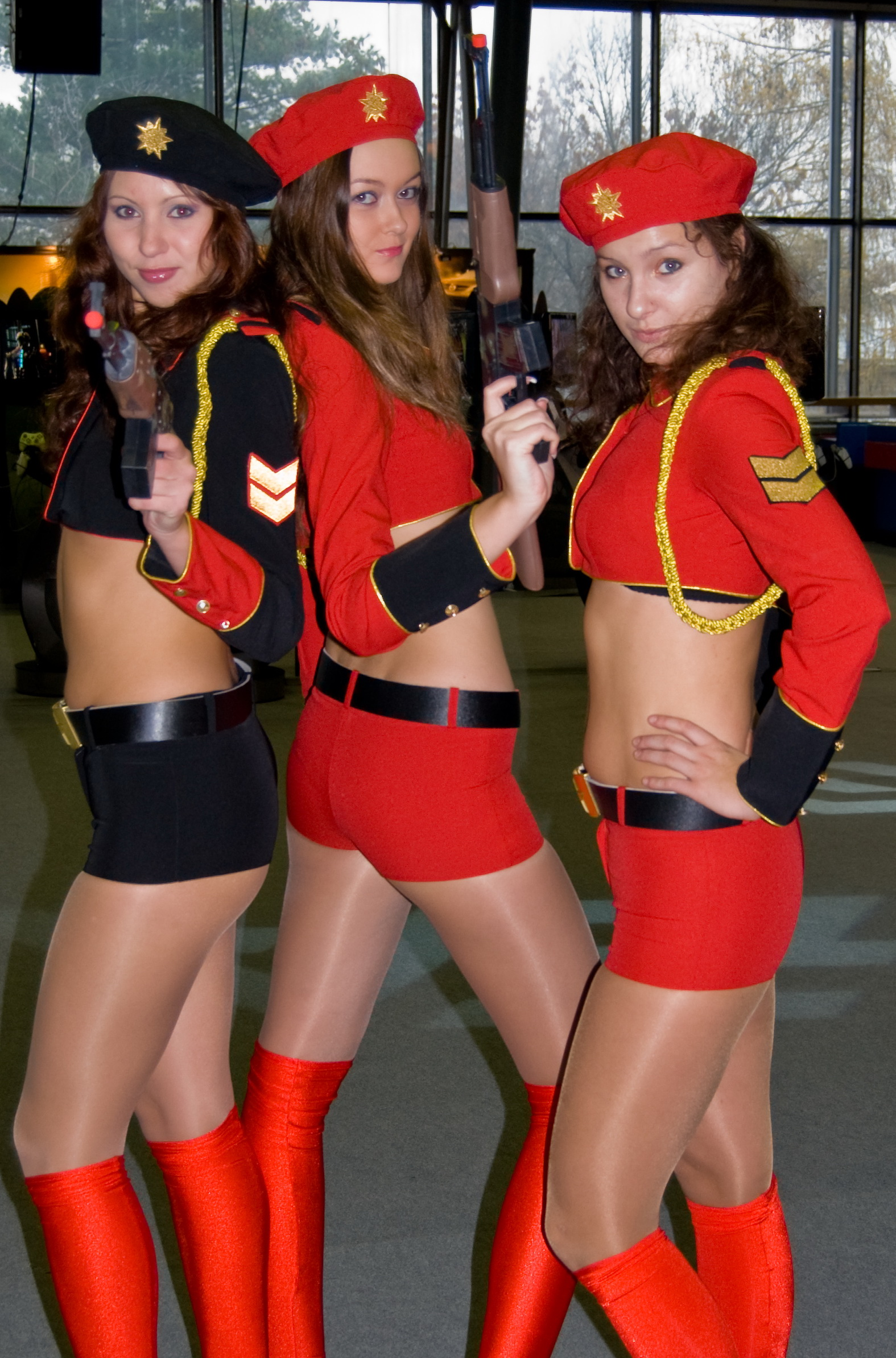
Promotion at IgroMir 2008

Red Alert 3 could be preordered and contained bonuses including the Command & Conquer: Red Alert 2 game, an exclusive multiplayer map, a bonus DVD containing various films, and Red Alert 3 desktop wallpapers. In the 2008 United States Presidential election, 43 people voted for Ackerman as a write-in candidate.

=== Premier Edition ===
The Red Alert 3 Premier Edition features a soundtrack CD (including remixes of "Hell March" and "Hell March 2"), and a bonus DVD containing making-of documentaries, footage from the developers, scenes from the shooting of the game's cinematics, and strategy tips. The game also includes a code for the download of exclusive multiplayer maps and a key for a beta of a future Command and Conquer game. It comes in a Soviet-themed tin case with a poster of the women in Red Alert 3. In the UK, the Premier Edition is exclusive to retailer Game.

In Taiwan, an exclusive limited Premier Edition was released, featuring an additional item, the Dicota Red Alert 3 backpack.

The copies of Red Alert 3 included a code to unlock an exclusive item in Warhammer Online: Age of Reckoning known as the "Kossar's Helm" for a limited time.

In 2008, EA Singapore as well as Gamers.com.my launched an exclusive Red Alert 3 Commander's Pack in Singapore and Malaysia. It was launched on October 27 for Singapore and October 28 for Malaysia. This Commander's Pack includes the C&C Red Alert 3 Premier Edition, C&C Red Alert 3 Dicota Notebook BacPac, and a Microsoft Sidewinder X6 Gaming Keyboard with Garskin Red Alert 3 decals. Exclusive posters and Soviet T-shirts were given to those who arrived earliest at the game's launch. A smaller and cheaper edition of the Commander's Pack called the Officer's Pack was also released. The Officer's Pack contained the C&C Red Alert 3 Premier Edition and C&C Red Alert 3 Dicota Notebook BacPac.

=== Ultimate Edition ===
A PlayStation 3 version of the game, called Red Alert 3: Ultimate Edition was released in March 2009. According to senior development director David Seeholzer the visual quality of the game was to stand up to HD Blu-ray definition. According to EA, Red Alert 3 was to have better graphics and performance on PlayStation 3 than the Xbox 360, thanks to the complex renderer from the PC version.

However, the request of many potential customers to take advantage of the PlayStation 3's capability of using a mouse and a keyboard for gaming purposes, even with threats of not buying the product, does not seem to be fulfilled. Seeholzer rather refers to the "step forward" made in developing the control interface for console, than giving a clear answer to the question in an interview with IGN.

== Reception ==
Reception

Aggregate score
Aggregator	Score
Metacritic	PC: 82/100; X360: 77/100; PS3: 75/100

Review scores
Publication	Score
1Up.com	PC: A−
Game Informer	8.75/10
GamePro	PC: 4/5
GameSpot	PC: 8.0/10
GameSpy	PC: 4/5
IGN	PC: 8.2/10
Official Xbox Magazine (US)	9.0/10
PC Gamer (UK)	88%
PC Gamer (US)	92%

Command & Conquer: Red Alert 3 received generally favorable reviews with an average critic score of 82/100 on Metacritic, citing a strong cooperative and multiplayer component.

During the 12th Annual Interactive Achievement Awards, the Academy of Interactive Arts & Sciences awarded Red Alert 3 with "Strategy/Simulation Game of the Year".
