= Command & Conquer: Generals – Zero Hour =

2003 video game

- Developer: EA Los Angeles (Note: Ported to Mac OS X by i5works.)
- Publisher: EA Games (Note: Mac OS X version published by Aspyr.)
- Director: John Salwitz
- Designer: Nathan James Levites
- Programmer: Jeffrey Lee Brown
- Artists: José Albanil; Eric Kearns
- Composers: Bill Brown; Mikael Sandgren
- Series: Command & Conquer
- Engine: SAGE
- Platforms: Windows; Mac OS X
- Release: Windows: NA: September 22, 2003; AU: September 25, 2003; EU: September 26, 2003; Mac OS X: NA: February 21, 2005
- Genre: Real-time strategy
- Modes: Single-player, multiplayer

Command and Conquer: Generals – Zero Hour is the expansion pack for the 2003 video game Command & Conquer: Generals. Zero Hour added several new abilities and units to each side, and a new mode of play called Generals' Challenge, along with a lot more changes, new features and bug/glitch fixes.

== Background ==
Zero Hour contains 3 new campaigns of five missions each, one for each side, with their chronological order being America first, Global Liberation Army (GLA) second, and PLA last. Unlike the previous campaigns, which were noted by Command and Conquer fans for not having full motion video cinematic sequences during mission briefing, the Zero Hour campaigns return to that Command and Conquer tradition, each showing a live-action video of a news reporter of the respective side giving details about the situation and instructions for what to do behind the current mission. The plot behind the Zero Hour campaigns picks up where it left off at the end of the previous campaigns.

== Plot ==
=== United States ===
The beginning of the US campaign relates to the GLA's success in the previous game. The GLA uses the Baikonur Cosmodrome to fire a toxin warhead at a US naval base in Northern Europe, prompting the US to respond before another missile can be fired. A Chinese assault on the base had previously failed, so the US uses the powerful Chinese arsenal to overrun and destroy the missile silo using a B-2 Bomber. The US then tasks itself with watching over the relief effort by the United Nations in Mogadishu, but GLA incursions make the relief mission difficult. A US carrier group in the region provides aerial cover as US forces storm a secret GLA base, unintentionally discovering documents relating to 'Dr. Thrax', a GLA General and scientist who plans to develop Anthrax Gamma Toxins. The US discovers from the documents that Dr. Thrax has a secret lab at Mount Elbrus, and so sends a team led by Colonel Burton to destroy it and liberate prisoners of war along the way, while the Chinese operative, "Black Lotus" gathers intelligence from across the river dividing the region. The US then leads a successful invasion on Iranian oil fields funding the toxin program, but it is soon learnt that Dr. Thrax has already developed the agent and plans to fire missiles loaded with the toxin at major US cities. A US led assault on Dr. Thrax's complex, supported by disillusioned GLA separatists, allows the US to capture the missile sites before they can be launched. It is also implied that Dr. Thrax was killed in the assault.

=== GLA ===
The start of the GLA campaign begins with Dr. Thrax's second in command (it is implied that the player acts as this person) being pursued by the Americans through an unknown city in the Middle East. Despite intense Tomahawk bombardment by the Americans, the General manages to evade the American pursuers and escapes from the area in a plane. With the whereabouts of Dr. Thrax still unknown, the GLA command is in complete disarray resulting in several splinter cells being formed to seize power. One such General, Prince Kassad uses stealth technology to which is vital to the GLA's war effort. Having abandoned the GLA cause, the loyalists in turn attack Kassad's base in Egypt, acquiring the stealth technology and killing Kassad in the process. Now equipped with the new technology, the GLA launches a series of covert operations in the Mediterranean, aimed at destroying the US fleet based there, including the USS Reagan, (Note: Unrelated to the real life USS Ronald Reagan.) a powerful super carrier. The GLA remarkably achieves this feat by using a captured Particle Cannon to sink the carrier. Shaken by the decisive victory, rumors begin to spread that the US is unwilling to continue its war against the GLA and will begin pulling troops from its bases in Europe. The GLA seize this chance and land Jarmen Kell and Hijackers on the US West Coast to steal toxins and US Army equipment from inside America. Jarmen Kell leads the attack, and ultimately succeeds in forcing the bulk of US forces be withdrawn from Europe to defend the homeland. The GLA, once again seizing the chance of a weaker American presence in Europe, launches an assault on US Central Command Base in Stuttgart, capturing Chinese and US bases and using the stolen hardware in the attack. The assault succeeds, and ushers in the period of GLA control over Europe.

=== China ===
Angered and embarrassed by the GLA's use of Chinese weaponry in conquering Europe, the Chinese respond by deploying nuclear weapons against the GLA. Survivors of the nuclear attack at Stuttgart prompt the Chinese to remove the GLA threat and liberate Europe in the process. But as the Chinese mobilise in Europe, a massive GLA assault against a nuclear reactor complex near Yencheng almost results in another GLA incursion inside China's borders. Though the reactor's defences were considerably crippled, the attack is ultimately thwarted and the Chinese successfully secured their borders once more. Determined to eradicate the GLA in Europe, the Chinese begin the counter-offensive in Germany, but international opinion of the Chinese will determine how well they will be received, so restraint is placed upon the Chinese to not deploy their nuclear weapons here. The city of Coburg is heavily defended by the GLA, but the Chinese resolve manages to push back the defenders, ultimately wiping out the GLA in the region, as well as allowing European opinion towards the Chinese to skyrocket. After taking serious losses to the Chinese, the GLA begins a mass withdrawal from Europe, but part of the route will pass a PLA base in Halberstadt, which is outfitted to intercept the retreating forces. Having lost almost all of its forces present in Europe, the GLA has but one last stronghold based in Hamburg. The Americans manage to rally enough forces to attack the base, but the GLA ambushes the American base, capturing it and using the US hardware to put a halt to the Chinese juggernaut. The Chinese manage to acquire US technology themselves, and push towards the heavily fortified GLA base. After heavy fighting, resulting in massive casualties on both sides, the Chinese emerge victorious and takes its place as the world's sole superpower. Meanwhile, it is implied that after the war, America, severely weakened by the war and upstaged by the PLA, adopts a policy of isolationism.

== Gameplay ==
In addition to the three factions from the vanilla game, three playable generals have been added to each faction, each with his or her strengths and weaknesses, as well as unique units and/or modifications to the standard arsenal.

=== Generals' Challenge ===
In this mode, the player takes on the identity of one of the nine generals and battles other generals one by one (excluding Infantry General and Demolition General), ultimately confronting a powerful boss general who utilizes technology from all three factions. This mode is somewhere between the campaign and skirmish modes, as the game starts unevenly with the enemy base already built, but there are no objectives other than to destroy all of the opponent's buildings to win.

=== Online play ===
Custom games can have up to eight players playing in one online game. Players can also set-up LAN games, with the number of players allowed depending on the speed of the host's Internet connection (modem, router, etc.).

=== Multiplayer ===
The game can be played through local area network (LAN), Internet connections like Gameranger or Radmin VPN (the latest version of the game with patch 1.04 is required).

== Development ==
The source code for Zero Hour and the original game was released under the GPL v3 license in 2025.

== Reception ==
Reception

Aggregate scores
Aggregator	Score
GameRankings	84%
Metacritic	83/100

The editors of Computer Gaming World nominated Zero Hour for their 2003 "Expansion Pack of the Year" award, which ultimately went to Battlefield 1942: Secret Weapons of WWII.
