= List of Westwood Studios games =

The following is a list of games developed by Westwood Studios.

== Video games ==
=== As Westwood Associates ===
Game	Details
Questron II Original release date: 1988	Release years by system: 1988 – Commodore 64, MS-DOS, Atari ST, Apple II, Apple IIGS, Amiga
Questron II Original release date: 1988	Notes: Role-playing video game; Co-developed with Quest Software; Published by Strategic Simulations
Donald's Alphabet Chase Original release date: 1988	Release years by system: 1988 – Amiga, Apple II, MS-DOS; 1990 – Commodore 64; 1991 – Amstrad CPC, ZX Spectrum
Donald's Alphabet Chase Original release date: 1988	Notes: Educational; Published by Disney Software
BattleTech: The Crescent Hawk's Inception Original release date: 1988	Release years by system: 1988 – MS-DOS; 1989 – Amiga, Apple II, Atari ST, Commodore 64
BattleTech: The Crescent Hawk's Inception Original release date: 1988	Notes: Role-playing video game; Published by Infocom; Part of the BattleTech series
Blackjack Academy Original release date: October 1988	Release years by system: 1988 – Amiga, Apple II, Commodore 64, MS-DOS
Blackjack Academy Original release date: October 1988	Notes: Card games; Published by MicroIllusions
Mars Saga Original release date: November 1988	Release years by system: 1988 – Apple II, Commodore 64, MS-DOS
Mars Saga Original release date: November 1988	Notes: Role-playing video game; Published by Electronic Arts; Updated and repackaged for the Apple II and MS-DOS as Mines of Titan and published by Infocom
A Nightmare on Elm Street Original release date: 1989	Release years by system: 1989 – Commodore 64, MS-DOS
A Nightmare on Elm Street Original release date: 1989	Notes: Action game; Published by Monarch Development
Hillsfar Original release date: 1989	Release years by system: 1989 – Amiga, Atari ST, Commodore 64, MS-DOS
Hillsfar Original release date: 1989	Notes: Role-playing video game; Published by Strategic Simulations; Part of the Dungeons & Dragons franchise; Included in the compilation Forgotten Realms: The Archives - Collection Two; Included in the compilation Advanced Dungeons & Dragons (Limited Edition Collector's Set)
BattleTech: The Crescent Hawk's Revenge Original release date: 1990	Release years by system: 1990 – MS-DOS
BattleTech: The Crescent Hawk's Revenge Original release date: 1990	Notes: Real-time tactics; Published by Infocom; Part of the BattleTech series; Sequel to BattleTech: The Crescent Hawk's Inception
Circuit's Edge Original release date: 1990	Release years by system: 1990 – MS-DOS
Circuit's Edge Original release date: 1990	Notes: Interactive fiction; Published by Infocom
DragonStrike Original release date: 1990	Release years by system: 1990 – Amiga, Commodore 64, MS-DOS; 1992 – NES
DragonStrike Original release date: 1990	Notes: Combat flight simulator; Published by Strategic Simulations; Part of the Dungeons & Dragons franchise
Goofy's Railway Express Original release date: 1990	Release years by system: 1990 – Amiga, Atari ST, Commodore 64; 1991 – MS-DOS
Goofy's Railway Express Original release date: 1990	Notes: Educational; Published by Disney Software
Mickey's Runaway Zoo Original release date: 1991	Release years by system: 1991 – Amiga, Atari ST, Commodore 64, MS-DOS
Mickey's Runaway Zoo Original release date: 1991	Notes: Educational; Published by Disney Software
Eye of the Beholder Original release date: 1991	Release years by system: 1990 – Amiga, MS-DOS; 1992 – PC-98; 1994 – Sega CD, Super NES
Eye of the Beholder Original release date: 1991	Notes: Role-playing video game; Published by Strategic Simulations; Part of the Eye of the Beholder series; Part of the Dungeons & Dragons franchise; Included in the compilation Forgotten Realms: The Archives - Collection One
Eye of the Beholder II: The Legend of Darkmoon Original release date: December 1991	Release years by system: 1991 – MS-DOS; 1992 – Amiga; 1993 – FM Towns, PC-98
Eye of the Beholder II: The Legend of Darkmoon Original release date: December 1991	Notes: Role-playing video game; Published by Strategic Simulations; Part of the Eye of the Beholder series; Sequel to Eye of the Beholder; Part of the Dungeons & Dragons franchise; Included in the compilation Forgotten Realms: The Archives - Collection One
Dungeons & Dragons: Warriors of the Eternal Sun Original release date: August 1992	Release years by system: 1992 – Sega Genesis
Dungeons & Dragons: Warriors of the Eternal Sun Original release date: August 1992	Notes: Role-playing video game; Published by Strategic Simulations; Part of the Dungeons & Dragons franchise; Working title was "Dungeons & Dragons: Hollow World"
Dungeons & Dragons: Order of the Griffon Original release date: September 1992	Release years by system: 1992 – TurboGrafx-16
Dungeons & Dragons: Order of the Griffon Original release date: September 1992	Notes: Tactical role-playing game; Published by Strategic Simulations and Turbo Technologies; Part of the Dungeons & Dragons franchise
Ancient Glory Original release date: 1993	Release years by system: 1993 – Apple IIGS
Ancient Glory Original release date: 1993	Notes: Action game; Published by Big Red Computer Club; Working title was "Ancient Dreams"

=== As Westwood Studios ===
Game	Details
The Legend of Kyrandia Original release date: August 1, 1992	Release years by system: 1992 – Amiga, MS-DOS; 1993 – FM Towns, MacOS; 1994 – PC-98; 2013 – Windows
The Legend of Kyrandia Original release date: August 1, 1992	Notes: Point-and-click Adventure game; Published by Virgin Interactive Entertainment; Part of The Legend of Kyrandia series; Working title was "Fables & Fiends: The Legend of Kyrandia"
Dune II Original release date: December 1992	Release years by system: 1992 – MS-DOS; 1993 – Amiga, Sega Genesis; 1995 – Risc OS
Dune II Original release date: December 1992	Notes: Real-time strategy; Published by Virgin Interactive Entertainment; Genesis port was titled Dune: The Battle for Arrakis; Part of Dune franchise
Lands of Lore: The Throne of Chaos Original release date: September 1993	Release years by system: 1993 – MS-DOS; 1994 – PC-98; 1995 – FM Towns
Lands of Lore: The Throne of Chaos Original release date: September 1993	Notes: Role-playing; Published by Virgin Interactive Entertainment; Part of the Lands of Lore series
The Legend of Kyrandia: Hand of Fate Original release date: November 1993	Release years by system: 1993 – MS-DOS; 1995 – FM Towns, PC-98
The Legend of Kyrandia: Hand of Fate Original release date: November 1993	Notes: Point-and-click Adventure game; Published by Virgin Interactive Entertainment; Sequel to The Legend of Kyrandia: Fables and Fiends; Part of The Legend of Kyrandia series
The Legend of Kyrandia: Malcolm's Revenge Original release date: January 1994	Release years by system: 1994 – MS-DOS; 1996 – MacOS; 2013 – Windows
The Legend of Kyrandia: Malcolm's Revenge Original release date: January 1994	Notes: Point-and-click Adventure game; Published by Virgin Interactive Entertainment; Sequel to The Legend of Kyrandia: Hand of Fate; Part of The Legend of Kyrandia series
Young Merlin Original release date: March 1994	Release years by system: 1994 – Super NES
Young Merlin Original release date: March 1994	Notes: Action-adventure; Published by Virgin Interactive Entertainment
The Lion King Original release date: November 1994	Release years by system: 1994 – Amiga, Sega Genesis, MS-DOS, Super NES; 2016 – Linux; 2017 – MacOS
The Lion King Original release date: November 1994	Notes: Platformer; Published by Virgin Interactive Entertainment
Monopoly Original release date: September 1995	Release years by system: 1995 – Windows, Windows 3.x 1996 – MacOS
Monopoly Original release date: September 1995	Notes: Strategy; Published by Hasbro Electronic Entertainment; Reissued in 1998 with a different box art
Command & Conquer Original release date: September 26, 1995	Release years by system: 1995 – MS-DOS; 1996 – MacOS, PlayStation, Sega Saturn; 1999 – Nintendo 64; 2009 – PlayStation 3, PSP
Command & Conquer Original release date: September 26, 1995	Notes: Real-time strategy; Published by Virgin Interactive Entertainment; Part of the Command & Conquer series; Re-released as Command & Conquer Gold for Windows in 1997; Expansion pack The Covert Operations was released in 1996; Also known as Command & Conquer: Tiberian Dawn; Given an HD remake by Electronic Arts and Petroglyph Games in 2020 and packaged in the Command & Conquer Remastered Collection
Command & Conquer: Red Alert Original release date: November 22, 1996	Release years by system: 1996 – MS-DOS, Windows; 1997 – PlayStation; 2009 – PlayStation 3, PSP
Command & Conquer: Red Alert Original release date: November 22, 1996	Notes: Real-time strategy; Published by Virgin Interactive Entertainment; Part of the Command & Conquer series; A prequel to the original Command & Conquer game; Two expansion packs Counterstrike and The Aftermath were released in 1997, then compiled into Retaliation in 1998; Given an HD remake by Electronic Arts and Petroglyph Games in 2020 and packaged in the Command & Conquer Remastered Collection
Lands of Lore: Guardians of Destiny Original release date: September 30, 1997	Release years by system: 1997 – MS-DOS, Windows
Lands of Lore: Guardians of Destiny Original release date: September 30, 1997	Notes: Role-playing Action game; Published by Virgin Interactive Entertainment; Part of the Lands of Lore series; Sequel to Lands of Lore: The Throne of Chaos; A PlayStation version was in the works but was cancelled
Blade Runner Original release date: November 14, 1997	Release years by system: 1997 – Windows
Blade Runner Original release date: November 14, 1997	Notes: Point-and-click Adventure game; Published by Virgin Interactive Entertainment
Games People Play: Hearts, Spades & Euchre Original release date: November 26, 1997	Release years by system: 1997 – Windows
Games People Play: Hearts, Spades & Euchre Original release date: November 26, 1997	Notes: Card games; Self-published by Westwood Studios
Dune 2000 Original release date: September 4, 1998	Release years by system: 1998 – Windows; 1999 – PlayStation
Dune 2000 Original release date: September 4, 1998	Notes: Real-time strategy; Published by Virgin Interactive (Electronic Arts published the PlayStation version); A partial remake of Dune II; Part of Dune franchise
Golden Nugget 64 Original release date: December 1, 1998	Release years by system: 1998 – Nintendo 64
Golden Nugget 64 Original release date: December 1, 1998	Notes: Casino game; Published by Electronic Arts
Lands of Lore III Original release date: March 3, 1999	Release years by system: 1999 – Windows
Lands of Lore III Original release date: March 3, 1999	Notes: Role-playing Action game; Published by Electronic Arts; Part of the Lands of Lore series; Sequel to Lands of Lore: Guardians of Destiny
Recoil Original release date: March 18, 1999	Release years by system: 1999 – Windows
Recoil Original release date: March 18, 1999	Notes: Vehicular combat; Co-developed by Zipper Interactive; Published by Electronic Arts
Sports Car GT Original release date: April 1, 1999	Release years by system: 1999 – PlayStation, Windows
Sports Car GT Original release date: April 1, 1999	Notes: Developed by Image Space Incorporated, co-developed by Westwood Studios; Published by Electronic Arts
Nox Original release date: June 13, 2000	Release years by system: 2000 - Windows
Nox Original release date: June 13, 2000	Notes: Action role-playing; Developed by Westwood Studios; Published by Electronic Arts
Command & Conquer: Tiberian Sun Original release date: August 27, 1999	Release years by system: 1999 – Windows
Command & Conquer: Tiberian Sun Original release date: August 27, 1999	Notes: Real-time strategy; Published by Electronic Arts; Part of the Command & Conquer series; Sequel to the original Command & Conquer game; Working title was Command & Conquer 2: Tiberian Sun; Expansion pack Firestorm was released on March 7, 2000
Command & Conquer: Red Alert 2 Original release date: October 23, 2000	Release years by system: 2000 – Windows
Command & Conquer: Red Alert 2 Original release date: October 23, 2000	Notes: Real-time strategy; Published by Electronic Arts; Part of the Command & Conquer series; Sequel to the original Command & Conquer: Red Alert game; Expansion pack Yuri's Revenge was released on October 10, 2001
Emperor: Battle for Dune Original release date: June 21, 2001	Release years by system: 2001 – Windows
Emperor: Battle for Dune Original release date: June 21, 2001	Notes: Real-time strategy; Co-developed by Intelligent Games; Published by EA Games; Sequel to Dune II; Part of Dune franchise
Pirates: The Legend of Black Kat Original release date: February 17, 2002	Release years by system: 2002 – PlayStation 2, Xbox
Pirates: The Legend of Black Kat Original release date: February 17, 2002	Notes: Action-adventure; Published by Electronic Arts
Command & Conquer: Renegade Original release date: February 26, 2002	Release years by system: 2002 – Windows
Command & Conquer: Renegade Original release date: February 26, 2002	Notes: Action First-person shooter; Published by EA Games; Part of the Command & Conquer series
Earth & Beyond Original release date: September 24, 2002	Release years by system: 2002 – Windows
Earth & Beyond Original release date: September 24, 2002	Notes: Massively multiplayer online role-playing game; Published by Electronic Arts

=== Ports ===
Title	Original release	Port release	Platform	Ref(s).
World Games	1986	1986	Amiga, Atari ST, Apple IIGS	
Temple of Apshai Trilogy	1985	1986	Amiga, Atari ST, Macintosh	
Super Cycle	1986	1986	Atari ST	
Roadwar 2000	1986	1987	Amiga, Apple IIGS, Atari ST	
Roadwar Europa	1987	1987	Amiga, Atari ST, Commodore 64	
Winter Games	1985	1987	Apple IIGS	
Phantasie III: The Wrath of Nikademus	1987	1987	Amiga, Atari ST, Commodore 64, MS-DOS	
California Games	1987	1988	Amiga	
Wargame Construction Set	1986	1988	MS-DOS	
Vindicators	1988	1989	NES	
Pac-Mania	1987	1990	NES	
