= Joseph D. Kucan =

American actor and video game developer

Joseph Kucan
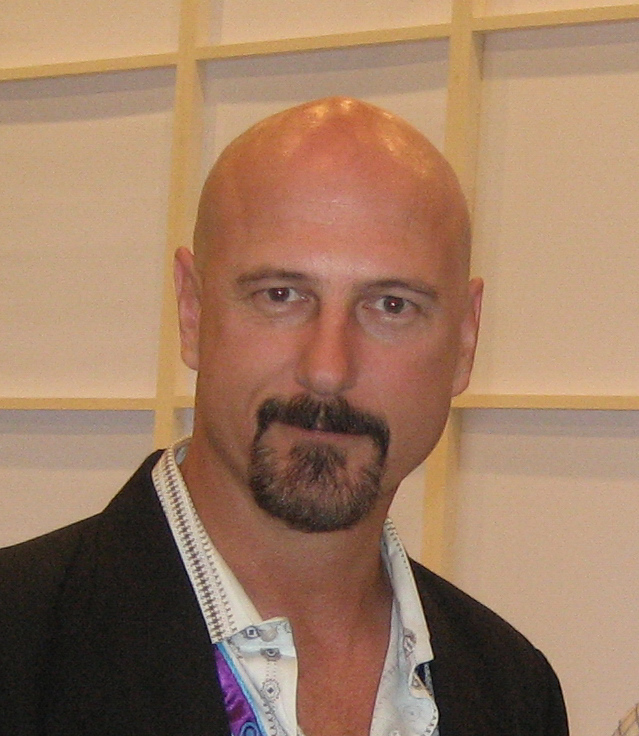
- Kucan at the 2009 Gamescom
- Occupations: director, actor, screenwriter, casting director
- Known for: Kane in Command & Conquer

Joseph D. Kucan is an American actor and theatre director. He worked on cinematic sequences for Westwood Studios video games. He is known for his portrayal of Kane, the leader of the Brotherhood of Nod in the Command & Conquer series. He is also the co-founder of A Public Fit Theatre Company in Las Vegas.

== Career ==
=== Early theatre and Westwood Studios ===
Kucan grew up in Las Vegas and became involved in the Rainbow Company Youth Theatre. He subsequently served for ten years as its educational director. He joined Westwood Studios as a dramatic director in 1993. His work included directing the filmed mission briefings and other cinematic sequences for Command & Conquer. In a 2008 interview with Retro Gamer, Kucan recalled that the original game's live-action sequences were filmed with a small crew against a painted backdrop, while changes to the game's design required frequent script revisions and reshoots.

Kucan also directed cinematic material for other Westwood titles, including Blade Runner (1997) and Dune 2000 (1998). A 2020 PC Gamer article reported that he had directed the Command & Conquer series' filmed sequences through Red Alert 2 (2000); behind-the-scenes footage included in the Command & Conquer Remastered Collection shows him directing on set.

=== Portrayal of Kane ===
Kucan first played Kane in Command & Conquer (1995). Westwood co-founder Brett Sperry had encouraged Kucan to film promotional scenes as a villain, leading to his association with the role. Kucan continued to portray Kane in the Tiberium series of Command & Conquer games. He returned for Command & Conquer 3: Tiberium Wars (2007), where he worked as an actor rather than directing the cinematics himself. He also appeared in Command & Conquer 3: Kane's Wrath (2008) and Command & Conquer 4: Tiberian Twilight (2010).

Richard Scott-Jones of PCGamesN contrasted Kucan's relatively restrained performance in the original game with his more theatrical portrayal in the sequels. Kucan told Scott-Jones that he had adjusted his characterisation in response to the qualities that players responded to, while retaining humour in his performance. In 2008, Guinness World Records recognised him for the longest recurring portrayal of a character by an actor in a video game franchise.

For the 2020 Command & Conquer Remastered Collection, Kucan filmed a new promotional video and supplied the production team with tapes and discs containing surviving behind-the-scenes material from the original games. His involvement was promotional and archival rather than a newly filmed performance within the remastered games.

=== A Public Fit Theatre Company ===
Kucan and theatre director Ann-Marie Pereth co-founded A Public Fit Theatre Company in Las Vegas. Kucan is its producing director. The company stages plays and readings and holds discussions with audiences after performances.

Kucan wrote and co-directed A Summons from the Tinker to Assemble the Membership in Secret at the Usual Place (2015), an audience-participation play based on Fritz Lang's film M (1931). The play combines a structured drama with improvisation in a way that encourages audience participation in the proceedings without derailing its forward momentum. Kucan also played the character of Hankel in the production.

Kucan and Pereth co-directed a 2023 production of Paula Vogel's Indecent. LaFrance praised their pacing and stagecraft in her review of the production. In 2026, they co-directed Christopher Chen's Passage in a collaboration between A Public Fit and the University of Nevada, Las Vegas' Nevada Conservatory Theatre.

== Video game credits ==
Kucan's video game work includes voice acting, live-action performances, directing and production.

Year	Game	Credited work
1992	The Legend of Kyrandia	Voice of King Brandon
1993	The Legend of Kyrandia: The Hand of Fate	Narrator; vocal direction
1993	Lands of Lore: The Throne of Chaos	Voices of Nathaniel the Herbalist and Phillip
1994	The Legend of Kyrandia: Malcolm's Revenge	Voice of King Brandon; vocal recording and video direction
1995	Monopoly	Design and production
1995	Command & Conquer	Kane; casting and cinematic direction
1996	Command & Conquer: Red Alert	Kane; direction of live-action sequences
1997	Lands of Lore: Guardians of Destiny	Director
1997	Blade Runner	Voice of Crazylegs; director of dramatic assets
1998	Dune 2000	Dramatic direction
1998	Command & Conquer: Red Alert – Retaliation	Director
1999	Command & Conquer: Tiberian Sun	Kane; director
1999	Lands of Lore III	Director of dramatic assets
2000	Nox	Dramatic asset director (cinematics)
2000	Command & Conquer: Tiberian Sun – Firestorm	Kane; director
2000	Command & Conquer: Red Alert 2	Director
2001	Command & Conquer: Yuri's Revenge	Director
2001	Emperor: Battle for Dune	Director of cinematic production
2002	Command & Conquer: Renegade	Voice of Kane; senior dramatic director (cinematics)
2002	Pirates: The Legend of Black Kat	Dramatic director
2007	Command & Conquer 3: Tiberium Wars	Kane
2008	Command & Conquer 3: Kane's Wrath	Kane
2010	Command & Conquer 4: Tiberian Twilight	Kane
2018	Command & Conquer: Rivals	Voice-over talent
2020	Command & Conquer Remastered Collection	Archival Kane performances; original casting and direction credits
