= Matthias Wagner =

German programmer

Matthias Wagner (or Matze) is a German programmer who has created utilities for games made by Westwood Studios, Electronic Arts and Petroglyph.

== Westwood Studios ==
=== FinalSun ===
FinalSun is an advanced map editor for Tiberian Sun.

=== FinalAlert ===
FinalAlert is a map editor for Red Alert 2 that went through numerous revisions. First came FinalAlert, developed independently by Wagner. It was later replaced by FinalAlert 2, a collaboration between Wagner and Westwood Studios, which was in turn upgraded to FinalAlert 2 Yuri's Revenge to allow support for Yuri's Revenge - this version was still an official utility. Wagner later released a tweaked version which had some bug fixes and included tunnels - leftover code from Tiberian Sun - although this version was no longer classed as an official Westwood utility.

== Electronic Arts ==
=== FinalBIG ===
FinalBIG is a utility for the modification of BIG files used by Command & Conquer: Generals and BFME.

== Petroglyph ==
=== FinalBIG for Empire at War ===
This version of FinalBIG now includes support for MEG files used by Empire at War.
