= Rocktronic =

Studio album by Frank Klepacki
- Released: 2004
- Genre: Industrial music, Rock music
- Length: 42:22
- Label: BMI
- Producer: Frank Klepacki

Frank Klepacki chronology
Morphscape (2002)	Rocktronic (2004)	Virtual Control (2005)

Rocktronic is the second solo album by video game music composer Frank Klepacki, released in 2004 and featuring ten songs.

== Track listing ==
1. Decible
2. Rocktronic
3. Escape
4. In Yo Face
5. Take me
6. It Has Begun
7. The Streets
8. In The Tunnel
9. Machines Collide
10. Bring the Fight

All tracks were written and performed by Frank Klepacki.
