= Frank Klepacki =

American musician and video game music composer

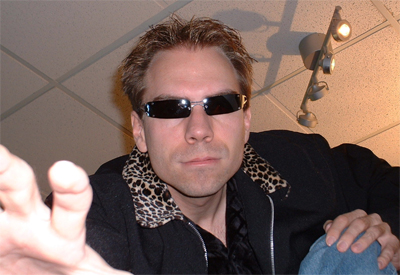
- Klepacki, from his solo album Morphscape (2002)

Background information
- Origin: Las Vegas, Nevada, US
- Genres: Industrial, industrial metal, post-grunge, alternative rock, electronic, funk, thrash metal, soul, jazz fusion, progressive rock
- Occupations: Video game music composer, musician
- Instruments: Guitar, bass, synthesizer, drums
- Website: FrankKlepacki.com

Frank Klepacki (/kləˈpæki/; Polish: [klɛˈpat͡skʲi]) is an American musician and video game composer, best known for his work on the Command & Conquer series. Having learned to play drums as a child, he joined Westwood Studios as a composer when he was 17 years old. He has scored several games there, including the Lands of Lore series, Westwood Studios' Dune games, The Legend of Kyrandia series, Blade Runner, and the Command & Conquer series. His work in Command & Conquer: Red Alert won two awards.

He lives in Las Vegas, where he has shaped a solo career and played and produced for several local bands. His personal and band work touches upon several genres, including orchestral, rock music, hip hop music, soul music, and funk. He has dubbed the style of music he writes as "Rocktronic". His work has appeared in various media, including the Spike TV program The Ultimate Fighter.

Klepacki is currently the audio director of Petroglyph Games, where he scored Star Wars: Empire at War. Klepacki was contacted to score Command & Conquer 3: Tiberium Wars, but was too busy with Petroglyph to take the project, and declined to mention the offer. Klepacki composed three songs for Command & Conquer: Red Alert 3 by EA Los Angeles. His solo CD entitled Viratia is packaged with a comic he helped produce.

== Early life and career ==
Klepacki was raised by a family of musicians of Polish and Italian descent who played on the Las Vegas strip. He drew art as a hobby, but music prevailed in his early interests. He received his first drumset at age 8 and began performing professionally by age 11. Among his early influences were electronica and heavy metal groups, including Depeche Mode, Afrika Bambaataa, AC/DC, and Iron Maiden. Seeking to master guitar, bass, and keyboards, he formed local bands and created a demo tape of original material by age 17. His impetus for diversifying his instrumental abilities was "not being able to communicate with other band members on ideas...for original songs." His first piece of audio gear was a TASCAM 4-track cassette recorder, which he used to record demos, band practices, and live shows.

After learning to program BASIC on a Tandy 1000 and becoming interested in computer and video games, he applied for a job as a game tester at Westwood studios. He submitted his demo tape—described as "an acoustic guitar song with electric guitar leads and keyboard strings, and raining sound effects"—to the company's audio director. The growing company enlisted him as a composer for the NES port of DragonStrike and the computer game Eye of the Beholder II. He later composed with MIDI sequencing for several other Dungeons & Dragons games. In 1992, he helmed the audio of Dune II, attempting to complement the music of the original Dune. He later noted that he pushed the sequencing program on his Amiga to the limit while scoring the game. While working on Disney's The Lion King in 1994, he and the Westwood team were shown sketches of the unfinished feature film. Film composer Hans Zimmer later praised Klepacki for reworking his scores. After finishing the third entry into The Legend of Kyrandia series, Malcolm's Revenge, Frank Klepacki met with Westwood leaders to discuss the upcoming game Command & Conquer, the first in a series which would bring him wider fame and critical acclaim.

=== Command and Conquer series ===
In 1994, Klepacki met with Westwood Studios developers to discuss the soundtrack of the company's next project, Command & Conquer. To define the game's style, Klepacki listened to a number of bands, including Nine Inch Nails and Ministry, which would supply the iconic industrial style found in the majority of the songs. He combined various elements of this music and added his own touch to create a unique sound. With the company's recent shift to 22 kHz audio, Klepacki composed with an Ensoniq ASR-10 sampler, a Roland S760 sampler, a Roland JD-990 synth module, and an electric guitar. The first few songs he composed for Command & Conquer contained voice samples, including the notable pieces "Act on Instinct" and "No Mercy" (which featured wild declarations from Bill & Ted's Bogus Journey). The samples were later found to interfere with the game's spoken audio, and were replaced with versions lacking the voices, although the original versions (and several other unused pieces) can still be found on the DOS C&C and Covert Operations discs. Complete versions of the songs later appeared on the game's commercial soundtrack. He would continue to sample clips from film and other media throughout his career, using a quote from The Brain from Planet Arous in the Yuri's Revenge track "Brainfreeze", for example. Klepacki next composed instrumental pieces for Command & Conquer, drawing influences from orchestral, house, heavy metal, and hip hop music. For the credits, Klepacki wrote "Airstrike", featuring a hook later used in Command & Conquer: Tiberian Sun for the Global Defense Initiative. Conversely, the Brotherhood of Nod ending used the song "Destructible Times", written by Klepacki's local band, I AM. The developers requested the song because it "reflected the war aspect and bad-ass vibe of Nod's side." The C&C expansion pack The Covert Operations featured seven new ambient pieces, all of which were also included on the disc in high quality CD Audio format. Though the soundtrack was not released through retail, Westwood sold it by special order through its website and in game catalogues.

While working on Covert Operations, Klepacki composed "Hell March", from the idea of "a rock tune to marching boots," finishing the song in one day after inventing the guitar riff. Upon listening, director Brett Sperry insisted this song be used as the signature theme of Command & Conquer: Red Alert. Originally intended for use with the Brotherhood of Nod, it features militaristic samples—including marching, industrial sounds, and a commander shouting orders. Klepacki initially scored Red Alert with sci-fi camp in mind, but early songs were shelved. He switched gears to write gritty pieces, prompting the Red Alert team to expand upon the style of Command & Conquer. In preparing to compose, Klepacki acquired new sample libraries for unique and strange sounds. Particular creative moods would result in a few songs at a time. He first wrote heavy songs like "Workmen" and "Crush", then composed neutral, synthesizer-laden music, such as "Vector" and "Roll Out". Klepacki also composed "Fogger" and "Mud", one of his personal favorites, before finishing with "Militant Force" and "Radio 2". He took breaks from working to make cameo appearances as a Soviet soldier killed by Kane and an Allied commander in the cut scenes of Red Alert. He previously appeared as a Nod soldier and the voice of the commando in Command & Conquer and would voice bit parts in future Westwood games.

Frank Klepacki's "Hell March"
A 30 second sample of "Hell March", the iconic piece from Red Alert.

After completing Red Alert, he took a short break to review his work. He concluded that some songs could be enhanced, but Red Alert had already gone gold, precluding new versions. These remixes later appeared on the unsuccessful Command & Conquer: Sole Survivor. Red Alert's soundtrack was voted best video game soundtrack of 1996 by PC Gamer and Gameslice magazines, defeating Trent Reznor's score for Quake. Reviewers called it "fun to listen to" and "second to none." As of 2005, Red Alert was listed in the Guinness Book of World Records for selling several million units, bringing Klepacki his widest audience. He wrote additional music for the game's expansion packs, Counterstrike and Aftermath. He attributed the success of Red Alert to an infusion of modern styles not found in other games. Klepacki initially wrote off the popularity of his music, assuming that his music "must only appeal to die-hards." He considered it "very surreal" to realize his soundtracks had gained him fame, and has since embraced his fans and critics.

=== Later Westwood games ===
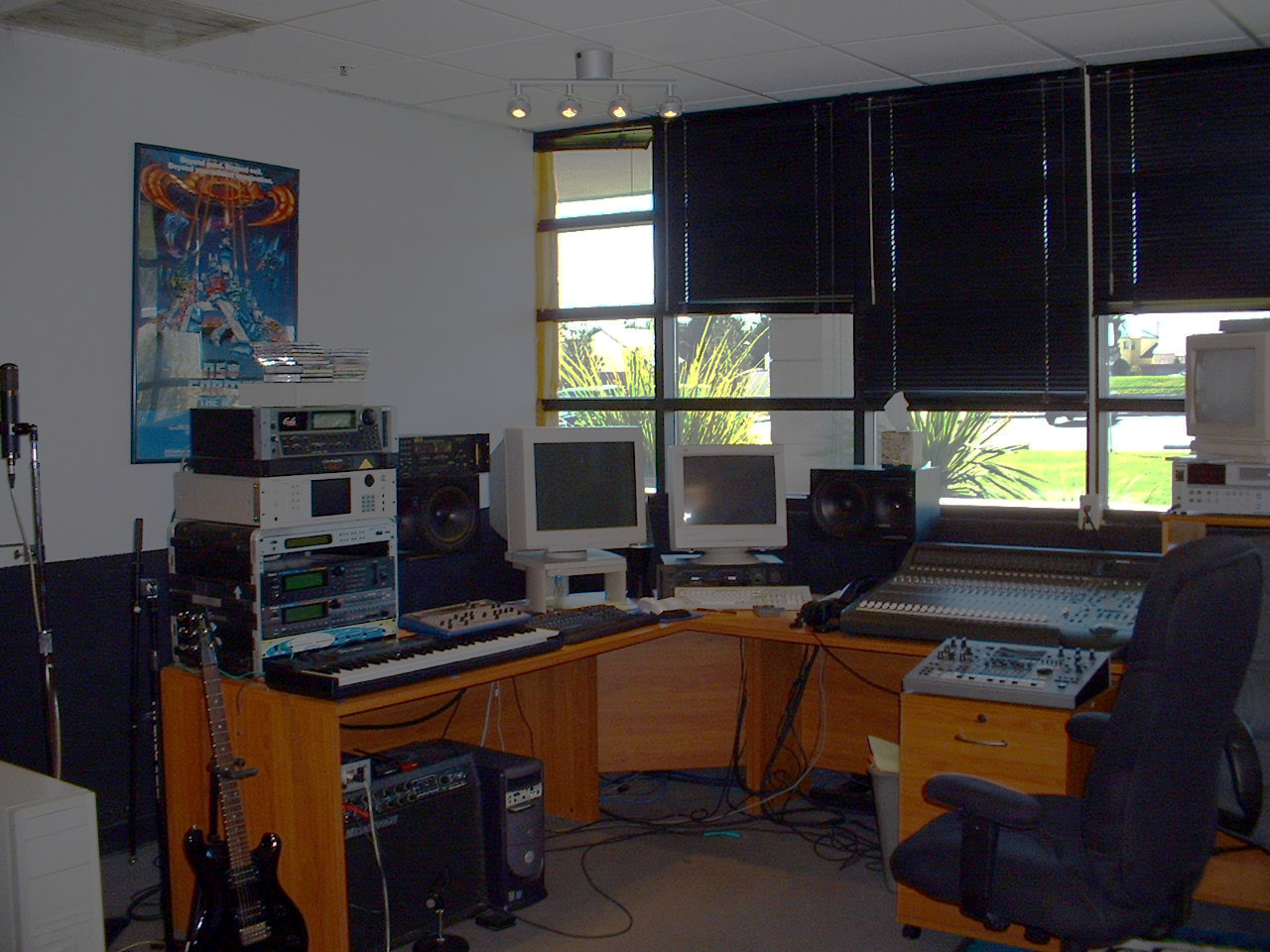
Klepacki's last office at Westwood

In 1997, Klepacki scored a Blade Runner adaptation. Though Westwood acquired the rights to use the original film score by Vangelis, the company was not allowed access to the original master recordings, and Klepacki had to recreate the themes by ear. Developers were satisfied by his attention to detail, feeling that his digital recreations sounded clearer than the originals. In 1998, Klepacki composed the soundtrack for Dune 2000. He attempted to update the music from Dune II into "this non-blip stuff," and worked in homages to the original style of the films as composed by Toto. Dune 2000 was panned by critics, though Klepacki's score was praised for adhering to the traditional Dune style. Klepacki considered 2000 to be a more definitive work than Dune II, which was constrained by software and hardware limitations. He then composed the soundtrack for Command & Conquer: Tiberian Sun with Jarrid Mendelson, with whom he would later collaborate on Emperor: Battle for Dune. He began by writing "Stomp", an energetic rock piece intended to recreate the effect of "Hell March" for the new game. Coincidentally, one of the trailers for Command and Conquer 3 featured "Stomp" as the soundtrack. Westwood instead wanted Tiberian Sun to feature darker, more moody music, and "Stomp" was shelved in favor of the current sound. Bereft of ideas due to the stark change in direction, Klepacki asked Mendelson to collaborate; he regards tracks they both worked on as the best. Tiberian Sun ultimately featured dark, ambient techno music and ambient space music suited to the game's post-apocalyptic and futuristic setting. Klepacki cited the piece "Mad Rap" as his favorite. An avid Star Wars fan, he enjoyed scoring cut scenes featuring James Earl Jones, the voice of Darth Vader. The scenes also allowed him to integrate the "Airstrike" and "No Mercy" themes into the game's score, despite the aforementioned shift. With the expansion pack Firestorm, he attempted to "set things right" by writing more upbeat songs and including "Stomp", which would also appear in Command & Conquer: Renegade.

He next scored Lands of Lore III and Command & Conquer: Red Alert 2. Klepacki defined Red Alert 2's style with heavy metal guitar and fast-paced beats. Klepacki scored the game with a Korg TR Rack, Novation Nova desktop, and Roland XV-5080. Red Alert 2 included a remix of "Hell March". The return to high-energy songs was owed in part to fan criticism of Tiberian Sun. Klepacki maintained the energetic style in Red Alert 2's expansion pack Yuri's Revenge. For Command & Conquer: Renegade, the next entry in the series, Klepacki tried to update the style of the original Command & Conquer by making it "hipper and more elaborate." Several Command & Conquer mainstays appear as reworked versions, including "Target (Mechanical Man)", "Industrial", "Act on Instinct" and "No Mercy". The main theme's melody comes from "C&C 80's Mix", a piece composed for Covert Operations, but which was scrapped before release. Klepacki's last contribution to Westwood Studios was the music of Earth & Beyond, comprising four albums of material. Acquired by Electronic Arts in 1998, Westwood was liquidated in 2002 and the remaining employees were relocated to EA Los Angeles. Several Westwood founders left the company. Though Klepacki offered to score Command & Conquer: Generals, and submitted a demo to EA, he was not offered the job. When asked in 2002 whether he'd continue scoring music after ten years in the business, he exclaimed, "ten down, next ten to go!" After Westwood's closure, he reflected on his past work at a dinner held by Joseph Kucan and other former employees.

=== Petroglyph Games ===
Klepacki took a brief hiatus to work on solo albums, then joined Petroglyph Games as full-time audio director in 2004. He prepared by becoming versed in the job's requirements and demands. His first task was scoring Star Wars: Empire at War, Petroglyph's launch title; he also helped select voice actors. A die-hard fan of the Star Wars franchise, Klepacki enjoyed complementing John Williams's style as he worked with sound effects used in the feature films. He worked closely with programmers to ensure perfect aural functionality. Though most of the game's score is John Williams's work, Klepacki estimates that he contributed 20% original material. Apart from the main theme, he aimed to minimize his editing in order to retain the classic Star Wars sound. He chiefly composed for new areas of the Star Wars universe only found in Empire at War. He calls his work on the game "the peak of my career," and felt he had spent his entire life grooming his abilities for that soundtrack. As a perk of composing, he visited the Skywalker Ranch and Industrial Light and Magic, and took pride in having his name associated with an official Star Wars product.

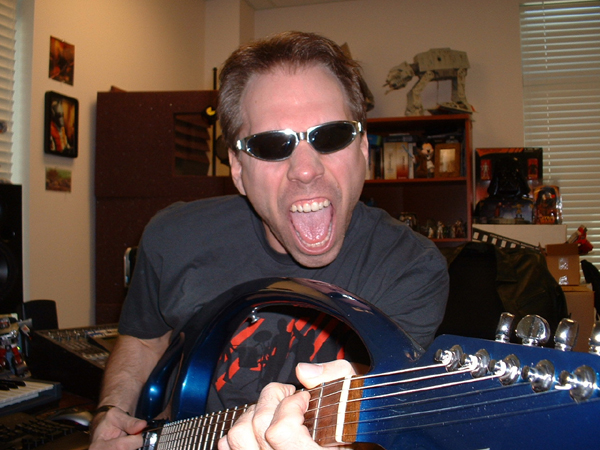
Klepacki at his Petroglyph office (c. 2009)

For the Forces of Corruption expansion pack, he took greater creative liberty with the Star Wars feel by writing an original theme for the new criminal faction. In attempting to compose this piece, he wrote several preliminary hooks that were later integrated into the game's battle themes. He composed six pieces for the expansion total, including the finale theme. In line with the criminal theme of the game, Klepacki borrowed motifs and recreated the mood from scenes involving Jabba the Hutt in Return of the Jedi. His score for the expansion pack was accepted upon first submission to LucasArts. As Petroglyph's audio director, he also selected sound effects, a tricky process due to the issue of making the criminal faction's sounds a "little different, without straying too much from the original signature sounds." Klepacki worked with LucasArts to select voice actors, and contributed his own talents to the role of IG-88 and other minor characters. A blooper reel of his voice acting was released on Petroglyph's forums after the one-thousandth member registered. Klepacki was contacted to score Command & Conquer 3, but was too busy with duties at Petroglyph and declined to mention the offer publicly. Electronic Arts hired Steve Jablonsky to score the game instead; an EA community manager at C&C 3's forums suggested that the audio team studied Klepacki's music and tried to recreate his style. Klepacki feels that Command & Conquer is a significant part of his life and that he would like to return to the Tiberian era. He conceded that employment at Petroglyph games would probably prevent him from working with Electronic Arts. Years later, in 2018, he would have that opportunity due to EA partnering with Petroglyph to remaster the games since many of the former developers from Westwood Studios had started, and continue to work at, Petroglyph.

Klepacki's next project was a game collaboration by SEGA and Petroglyph named Universe at War: Earth Assault. As of December 2006, he had composed several songs for various factions and enjoyed the "opportunity to create something new again, not based on...existing intellectual property. Klepacki "began by taking into account what songs were identified as fan favorites in...past related work". He was interviewed about the creative process on 27 March 2007 by Kevin Yu, a Petroglyph community manager, and provided a detailed tour of his studio at the company. His office included one of the fastest computers at Petroglyph and a vocal booth where unit responses and other vocalizations were tested and tweaked before voice actors performed finishing work. Klepacki was glad that Universe of War did not demand strict obedience to a particular style. He declared that surprises were in store for Command & Conquer fans waiting for him to return to his "roots" and "adrenaline-pumping soundtrack style", and suggested that they "imagine my mindset...when Command & Conquer first came out, and add about fifteen years experience to that." Klepacki summarized the game's main styles shortly before release:

For the Hierarchy—our evil alien race—I went with a more heavy-metal rock influence, to go along with how they stomp all over everything on the map with their massive walker units. Novus—our high-tech, hit-and-run faction—featured more industrial electronica to go along with their futuristic robotic feel. For our third faction, the Masari—our ancient star-faring side—I provided an epic orchestral feel, with worldly influences to reflect their godlike nature and questionable links to our past. One Masari track in particular, "Divine Intervention," would become the central theme to the whole game.

As audio director, Klepacki also created many sound effects for Universe at War. For the alien Hierarchy, he cultivated an "unnatural" aesthetic through an "arsenal of mangled noises". Klepacki used a "combination of heavy cranes recorded with overdriven impacts" to give the faction's walkers a "menacing machinelike breathing sound", and made up his own language to record "various grunts, growls, mannerisms, and strange vocalizations. Since Hierarchy heroes needed to communicate to the player in English, Klepacki engineered dialogue to seem as if the aliens were "telepathically speaking to you, with a back-masking effect on their voices...as if the words are being channeled straight to your brain". The Novus effects were usually phased and involved "mechanical movement, electricity, and metal sounds". He invented yet another language for two characters Viktor and Mirabel, who occasionally speak to one another. Lastly, he drew on weather and other natural sounds for the Masari, describing their ambience as having "more weight, thunder, heavy bass rumblings, vortex gusts..." Klepacki directed the voice-acting to have a "noble and strong" feel without appearing typically medieval or overly dramatic. He ultimately felt he did the work of "three people" with Universe at War, as the game's audio requirements changed constantly, requiring vigilance and programmer support. Divine Intervention was later nominated for a Game Audio Network Guild award, and the soundtrack was released as a free download after Petroglyph's efforts toward a traditional release were frustrated.

Klepacki next composed three songs for Command & Conquer: Red Alert 3, including "The Red Menace", "Grinder 2", and "Hell March 3". "Hell March 3" was recorded with the aid of a four-piece rock band alongside the Skywalker Symphony Orchestra and Choir at the Skywalker Sound scoring stage; the choir also sang in Russian for an updated version of "Grinder" from Red Alert 2. He remarked in 2008 that he would never grow tired of "Hell March", and was thankful it had resonated with so many fans. Around this time, he composed using Cubase, Kontakt, a MOTU 2408 audio interface, and several instruments. Collaborating with Video Games Live, Klepacki performed "Hell March" and its Red Alert 2 version in Las Vegas in 2008, and later performed "Hell March 3" in the Netherlands with a choir and orchestra through the Games in Concert series; he wore a Soviet army conscript uniform for the song.

=== Solo and band work ===
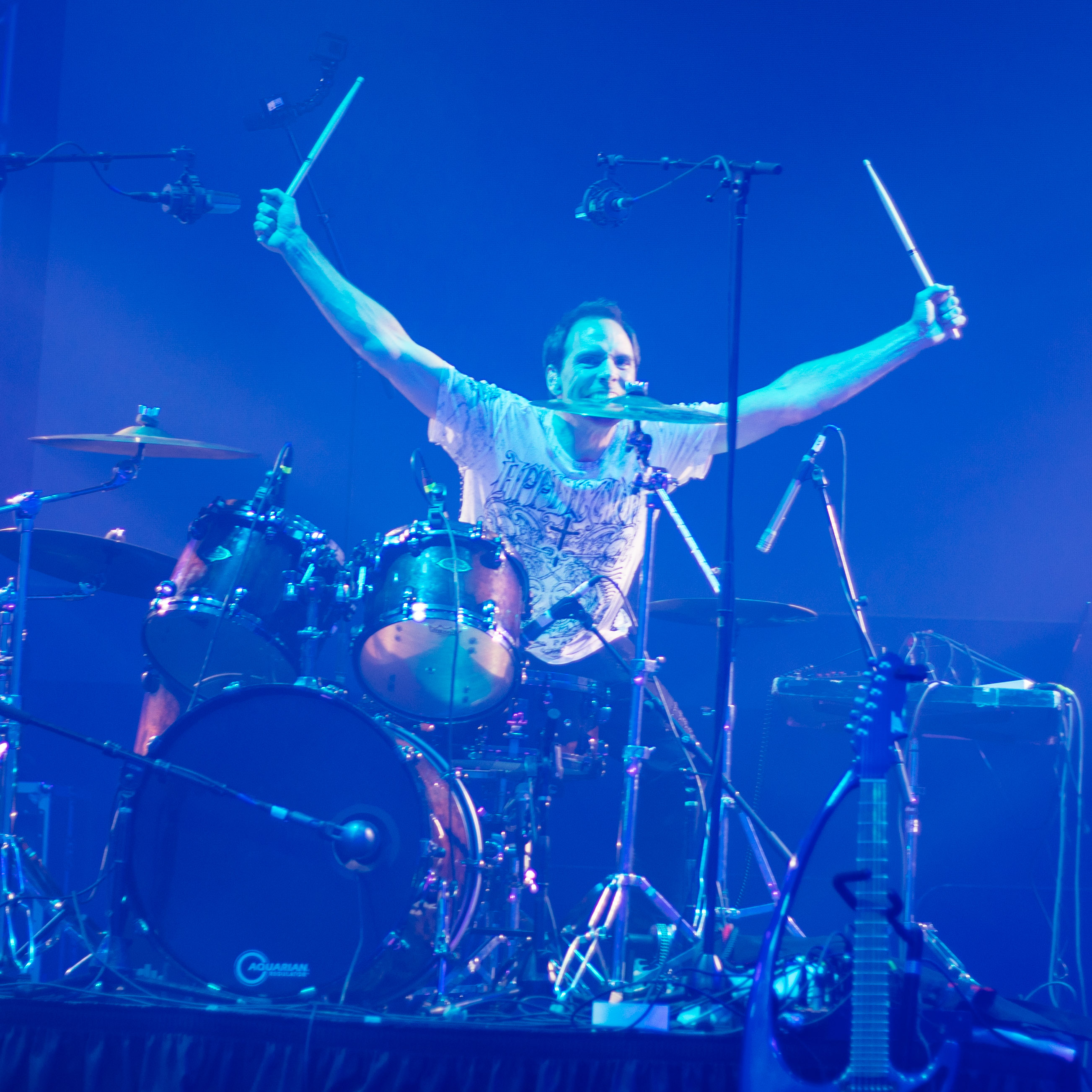
Frank Klepacki at Magfest 2019 playing a drum set

Klepacki has also played in and produced albums for several Las Vegas bands. I AM's There's a Home is his first full-length CD appearance. The band featured Greg Greer on vocals, Rod Arnett on bass, Dan Ryan on guitar, and Klepacki on drums. Formed from the rhythm section of local band Shatterbone, I AM released one album in 1995 and broke up. Described as alternative progressive rock, the band's music drew influences from Tool and Soundgarden. The song "Destructible Times" was used for the Brotherhood of Nod ending in the original Command & Conquer. After the break-up, Klepacki joined Home Cookin', a ten-member ensemble which played funk and soul in the tradition of Tower of Power. Founded in 1989, Home Cookin' commercially debuted with Mmm, Mmm, Mmm, in 1997 (which featured a number one hit) and released a second album (Pink in the Middle) in 2000 before disbanding following a tour in California. Towards the end of its run, the band played at Quark's Bar in Star Trek: The Experience and at the Boston Grill and Bar. The group sometimes opened shows with a four-member funk act named Junkfood. Home Cookin' was popular by readers of Las Vegas Weekly, winning several awards over its history—including "Best Horns" in a band. Klepacki boasted that turnout for the band at clubs was usually above four hundred people. In 2003, he formed The Bitters, a trio composed of Klepacki, bassist Vinny Moncada, and guitarist Jeff Murphy. With a style described as metal and jazz fusion, the group has released one album as of August 2006. Klepacki is also a member of the group Mo Friction, supported by former Home Cookin' members. Their debut album will mark Klepacki's first outing as a band's lead vocalist.

Klepacki's "Rocktronic"
A 30 second sample of "Rocktronic", displaying Klepacki's solo style of composition.

Klepacki's solo work debuted in 2002 with Morphscape. Production began in 1996 with the song "Cybertek", though an album was not planned at this time. The rest of Morphscape's songs were composed after Red Alert 2. Klepacki composed the album's title track while working on Command & Conquer: Renegade, and feels the game's style is visibly present in Morphscape. Klepacki released the final product after Westwood's dissolution. His biggest inspiration in creating solo works is the legion of fans interested in Command & Conquer. Klepacki took a hiatus from composing video game music to write two other solo albums, the first of which is entitled Rocktronic. Released in 2004, the album was described as dark, edgy, and heavy in a way that will appeal to Command & Conquer fans. Klepacki sought out specific samples and instruments used in the Command & Conquer soundtrack for use in the release; the title "Rocktronic" was an attempt to name his style of music. Featuring live drumming in certain songs, the album is Klepacki's best-seller. Following Rocktronic was Virtual Control, released in 2005. Klepacki complemented his usual style with experiments in hip hop on the album. Tracks from each release have been periodically used in The Ultimate Fighter, along with certain custom themes written for the show.

On 1 August 2006, he revealed his next solo project would be named Awakening of Aggression and confirmed the music would be "heavy" and "hard-hitting." When interviewed, Klepacki said that he channeled stress into the heavy music of the new album. Aggression was released in October of the same year, and was made available on iTunes on 7 December. He filled the liner notes of the album with the names of several supportive fans who had purchased his music. As of April 2007, he speculates that a new solo release will be ready by the end of the year. After establishing recognition on Ultimate Fighter, Klepacki began scoring themes for HDNet's Inside the MMA and HDNet Fights in autumn 2007. Around this time, he made it to the district finals of the Guitar Center "drum-off" competition after winning two store challenges in Las Vegas but was eliminated. His solo album Infiltrator was released in April 2009. According to Klepacki, the album was inspired by his recent work on the Red Alert series. Klepacki enjoys Las Vegas thanks to its diversity of musical talent and prolific number of shows and attractions. He attributes his showmanship to being raised in the city, noting that one has to "stand out" to be noticed among the entertainment atmosphere of Vegas. The city's Las Vegas Weekly honored him as a "badass composer" in its mid-April 2009 issue, highlighting his prolific fan-base and work as producer for various local bands.

== Work and beliefs ==
When composing for video games, Klepacki spends a few days to compose and master one song on average. He feels writing music for games is somewhat difficult as only early software builds are available to play; he sometimes must compose songs based on vague descriptions. Composing for cut scenes is easier by comparison, and Klepacki enjoys drawing inspiration and direction from game design art. Nonetheless, he prefers to compose for a game throughout its development rather than write songs for a finished product. He feels that game music has been harder to compose than film or solo music as he must compose for all situations a player may discover or engineer. Klepacki maintains templates with a base of common instruments prepared for sudden bursts of inspiration, as he resents "having technical issues...as an obstacle." When asked how the composing process begins, Klepacki related:

It starts with knowing what I'm composing for. Is it a battle theme, or main title, or ambient theme, etc. Then I figure out what type of mood or style best fits...the subject matter. From there it's about picking the right instrumentation and then the writing process starts. It could start with anything; a guitar riff, a French horn melody, a drum rhythm or bass line. Then I keep alternating instruments track by track recording one part at a time until I have something that sounds full and gets the point across I'm trying for.

Klepacki has said that the most rewarding part of composing video game music is working with a team—which he compares to chemistry between band members—and knowing he is part of a greater cause. He believes that game music could improve if artists focused on quality and derived inspiration from playing games. He has expressed interest in having Electronic Arts sell his soundtracks in retail stores, preferably next to video games in electronic departments. He advises those wishing to get in the video game business to attend conventions and investigate developer companies. He also noted in 2008 that "composition and engineering skills are now required," advising upstart composers to ensure their work is film-quality. Klepacki is happy to see older games offered on the Wii, hoping that gamers are "recognizing once again that simple, short fun experiences are just as good as...long, huge-production experiences." Klepacki listed several influences for his style of composition: "John Williams naturally for my love of Star Wars and his style in general, Michael Kamen for his composing diversity, Metallica for sparking my metal influence, Vince Dicola who in my opinion is way under-rated for his great work, Sly & The Family Stone for inspiring funk, syncopation, and positive energy, Larry Graham for inspiring me to play funk bass, Nine Inch Nails for their unique uses of mangled sound, and Rob Zombie for combining music with a theme and persona."

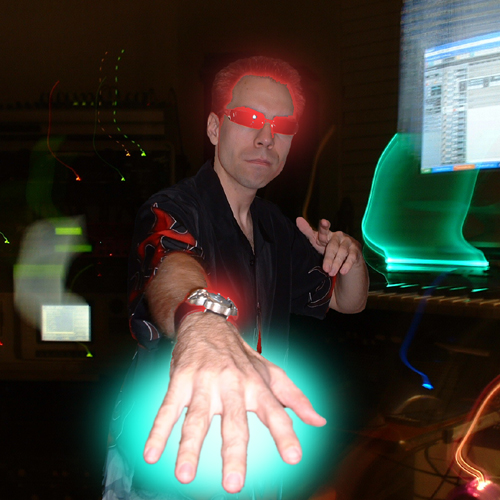
Image of Klepacki from Rocktronic (2004)

Klepacki runs a personal website featuring a biography, archived interviews, and a playlist of songs streamed in 128 kbit/s mp3. His music is also available from iTunes. As a Star Wars fan, he has extensively written about the film premieres of the last two prequels on his website. He maintains an account at YouTube and has posted three videos of his work with other bands. He is an ardent supporter of digital cinema, believing the medium to be the pinnacle of quality. He has scored two short films, and won a CineVegas award for his work with Unreel Invasion. Klepacki believes that the genre of video game music is more respected than it has ever been. He notes that complex and quality music comes at a higher cost, prompting certain producers to simply "get somebody who could cop the Hollywood sound" instead of nurturing original style. When asked about his career low-point, he named Order of the Griffon for the TurboGrafx-16, citing difficulties with the system's limited musical capabilities. Concerning his solo career and Westwood, Klepacki regrets "not having attended more of the fun company functions and parties while I was instead playing club gigs with bands with the mentality of trying to get signed or discovered." When asked to reflect on his career, he replied:

The ironic thing is that my original goal in life was to be in a famous band, tour the world and sell millions of albums. Although that didn't quite happen, I got something else just as gratifying. Instead of being in a famous band, I gained some fame in the industry as a game composer. Instead of touring the world, I receive fan mail from around the world. Instead of selling millions of albums, my music is on millions of games! And I sell enough of my own albums that allows me to keep releasing them. So in a different way, I kind of got what I wanted after all. And I'm more than happy with that. The most fulfilling part of it is that I feel I contributed something that mattered to a significant number of people, and more importantly, I got to be a part of projects that mattered a lot to my life personally, like Star Wars!

Klepacki is not seeking a record deal, citing a "horrible chain of steps to getting famous." Scathingly critical of the recording industry, he blames MTV—described as a "teenage reality show channel"—for putting a pretty face on music and destroying the independent valuation of actual sound. Klepacki has declared pop music as having become the "largest farce in music history—soul-less, mechanical, and only made for the sole purpose of making the fastest dollar possible, with more emphasis on imagery than the music." He's also criticized lip-synching and the repackaging of music genre through different labels—such as Nu metal for rock music and Neo soul for soul music. He believes that signing a deal does not guarantee profits, and would rather keep his day job as audio director. These sentiments were echoed in a special feature on the band Home Cookin'; in 2000, Klepacki said the group wanted to "work with a label, not for them." Stating that he would not compromise his work for popularity, he believes that "the only artists that have any longevity are the ones that pioneer a movement—not follow one." He enjoys working independently, as he does not have to "change...music for the sake of pop radio." He champions the internet as a medium through which creative and original artists can be found. Klepacki believes it is the preferred avenue for music when compared to radio airplay—where one hears "the exact same songs 3 months at a time." When interviewed about file-sharing, he expressed mixed emotions. Holding that compact discs are "just too damn expensive", Klepacki believes that a few dollars' reduction in price would "deter people from downloading for free." Conversely, he notes that artists—who "don't get as much money as you think"—need to be compensated for their work. His favorite artists by decade, starting with the 1960s, are Sly and the Family Stone, Graham Central Station, Metallica, Home Cookin', and Bob Schneider.

== Frank Klepacki & The Tiberian Sons ==
The band consists of:

- Frank Klepacki – guitar, keys, drums
- Tony Dickinson – guitar, keys, bass, frontman
- Connor Engstrom – guitar
- Travis Moberg – drums
- Max Noel – bass

The Tiberian Sons minus Klepacki have released the albums Conquering MAGFest (2015) and Collateral Jammage (2016). In 2020, they all collaborated to produce Frank Klepacki & The Tiberian Sons: Celebrating 25 Years of Command & Conquer for the remastered collection.

== Works ==
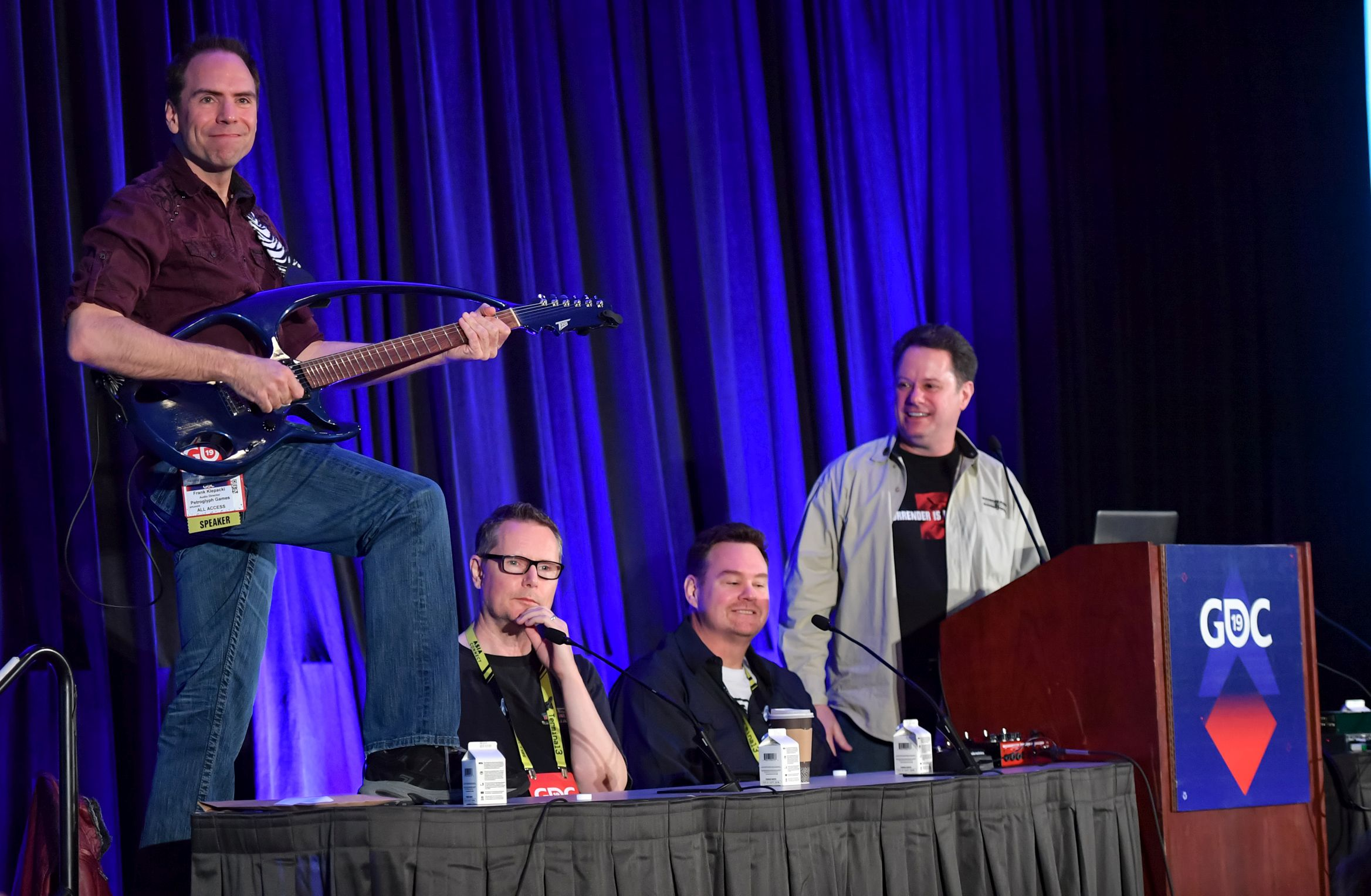
Klepacki at the Game Developers Conference 2019, as part of a Command & Conquer retrospective panel

=== Video game music ===
- Eye of the Beholder II (Westwood Studios, 1991)
- Dune II (Westwood Studios, 1992)
- Dungeons & Dragons: Warriors of the Eternal Sun (Westwood Studios, 1992)
- Order of the Griffon (Westwood Studios, 1992)
- DragonStrike (Westwood Studios, 1992) (NES port only)
- The Legend of Kyrandia (Westwood Studios, 1992)
- Lands of Lore: The Throne of Chaos (Westwood Studios, 1993)
- The Legend of Kyrandia: Hand of Fate (Westwood Studios, 1993)
- The Lion King (Westwood Studios, 1994)
- The Legend of Kyrandia: Malcolm's Revenge (Westwood Studios, 1994)
- Young Merlin (Westwood Studios, 1994)
- Command & Conquer (Westwood Studios, 1995)
- Monopoly (Westwood Studios, 1995)
- Command & Conquer: The Covert Operations (Westwood Studios, 1996)
- Command & Conquer: Red Alert (Westwood Studios, 1996)
- Command & Conquer: Red Alert: Counterstrike (Westwood Studios, 1997)
- Command & Conquer: Red Alert: The Aftermath (Westwood Studios, 1997)
- Lands of Lore: Guardians of Destiny (Westwood Studios, 1997)
- Blade Runner (Westwood Studios, 1997)
- Command & Conquer: Red Alert: Retaliation (Westwood Studios, 1998)
- Command & Conquer: Sole Survivor (Westwood Studios, 1998)
- Dune 2000 (Westwood Studios, 1998)
- Command & Conquer: Tiberian Sun (Westwood Studios, 1999)
- Lands of Lore III (Westwood Studios, 1999)
- Command & Conquer: Tiberian Sun – Firestorm (Westwood Studios, 2000)
- Command & Conquer: Red Alert 2 (Westwood Pacific, 2000)
- Nox (Westwood Studios, 2000)
- Command & Conquer: Red Alert 2: Yuri's Revenge (Westwood Pacific, 2001)
- Emperor: Battle for Dune (Westwood Studios, 2001)
- Pirates: The Legend of Black Kat (Westwood Studios, 2001)
- Command & Conquer: Renegade (Westwood Studios, 2002)
- Earth & Beyond (Westwood Studios, 2002)
- Star Wars: Empire at War (Petroglyph Games, 2006)
- Star Wars: Empire at War: Forces of Corruption (Petroglyph Games, 2006)
- Universe at War: Earth Assault (Petroglyph Games, 2007)
- Command & Conquer: Red Alert 3 (EA Los Angeles, 2008)
- Command & Conquer: Red Alert 3 – Uprising (EA Los Angeles, 2009)
- Panzer General: Allied Assault (Petroglyph Games, 2009)
- Guardians of Graxia (Petroglyph Games, 2010)
- Mytheon (Petroglyph Games/True Games, 2011)
- Rise of Immortals (Petroglyph Games, 2011)
- Battle for Graxia (Petroglyph Games, 2012)
- Coin a Phrase (Petroglyph Games, 2013)
- End of Nations (Petroglyph Games/Trion Worlds, cancelled)
- Grey Goo (Petroglyph Games, 2015)
- 8-Bit Armies (Petroglyph Games, 2016)
- 8-Bit Hordes (Petroglyph Games, 2016)
- 8-Bit Invaders! (Petroglyph Games, 2016)
- Lethal League Blaze (Team Reptile, 2018)
- Conan Unconquered (Petroglyph Games, 2019)
- Command & Conquer Remastered Collection (Petroglyph Games/EA, 2020)
- Modern Warships (Artstorm FZE, 2022)
- 9-Bit Armies: A Bit Too Far (Petroglyph Games, 2024)
- Tempest Rising (Slipgate Ironworks/2B Games, 2025)
- Stormgate (Frost Giant Studios, TBA)
- Earthbreakers (Petroglyph Games, TBA)

=== Band, film, and solo music ===
- There's a Home (I AM, 1995)
- Mmm, Mmm, Mmm, (Home Cookin', 1997)
- Unreel Invasion (short film, 1999)
- Pink in the Middle (Home Cookin', 2000)
- Essence of the Force (short film, 2002)
- Morphscape (2002)
- Rocktronic (2004)
- Virtual Control (2005)
- The Bitters (The Bitters, 2006)
- Awakening of Aggression (2006)
- Grudgement Day (The Bitters, 2008)
- Infiltrator (2009)
- Viratia (2009)
- Conquering 20 Years (2012)
- Digital Frontiers (2016)
- Game On! (Tina Guo, 2017)
- Transform (2018)
- Coded Number (2020)
- Quarantine Sessions (2021)
- Initiative (2023)
- Greetings from 1986 (2024)

=== Commercial music ===
- MTV (1997)
- Cupid (abc, 2000)
- Miller Genuine Draft (2001)
- Ultimate Fighting Championship Pay-per view (Fox Sports, 2003–2006)
- The Ultimate Fighter (Spike TV, 2005–2006)
- Ultimate Fight Night (Spike TV, 2005–2006)
- Amp'd Mobile (Spike TV, 2005–2006)
- Inside the MMA (HDNet, 2007)
- HDNet Fights (HDNet, 2007)

== See also ==
- Music of the Command & Conquer series
- Universe at War: Earth Assault soundtrack
