= Battle for Graxia =

- Battle for Graxia logo
- Developer: Petroglyph Games
- Publisher: Petroglyph Games
- Producer: Steve Wetherill
- Composer: Frank Klepacki
- Platform: Microsoft Windows
- Release: November 26, 2012 (Open Beta)
- Genre: Multiplayer online battle arena
- Mode: Multiplayer

Battle for Graxia was a free-to-play multiplayer online battle arena game developed by Petroglyph Games for Microsoft Windows. The game went open beta on Steam on November 28, 2012 in substitution of its predecessor Rise of Immortals. The game shut down on June 27, 2013.

== Features ==
Battle for Graxia features a social hub where players can show off their enhanced Immortals, chat, emote, browse leaderboards, shop, manage friend and guild lists and more. Players also have the option of taking their Immortals through cooperative Player versus Environment (PvE) scenarios to learn the game, try out new abilities and earn persistent experience before jumping into Player versus Player (PvP) matches online.
