= Awakening of Aggression =

Studio album by Frank Klepacki
- Released: 2006
- Genre: Funk, Industrial metal, Alternative rock
- Length: 38:32
- Label: BMI
- Producer: Frank Klepacki

Frank Klepacki chronology
Virtual Control (2004)	Awakening of Aggression (2006)	Infiltrator (2009)

Awakening of Aggression is the fourth solo album by video game music composer Frank Klepacki, released in 2006. Like his earlier albums, it contains ten tracks.

== Track listing ==
1. "Awakening"
2. "Kill"
3. "Krung Kick"
4. "Strange"
5. "Fantasy"
6. "Rox"
7. "Brain Dead"
8. "Magnafried"
9. "Vigilante"
10. "Rage and Fury"
