= Morphscape =

Studio album by Frank Klepacki
- Released: 2002
- Genre: Industrial music, Rock music
- Length: 42:18
- Label: BMI
- Producer: Frank Klepacki

Frank Klepacki chronology
Morphscape (2002)	Rocktronic (2004)

Morphscape is the first solo album by video game music composer Frank Klepacki, released in 2002 and featuring ten songs.

== Track listing ==
1. Morphscape
2. Blaster
3. Freaks from Within
4. Cybertek
5. Mode One
6. Gonna Rock Yo Body
7. Cosmic Lounge
8. Morphunk
9. Defunkt
10. Virus

All tracks were written and performed by Frank Klepacki.
