= Virtual Control =

Studio album by Frank Klepacki
- Released: 2005
- Genre: Funk, hip hop, industrial music, rock music
- Length: 38:46
- Label: BMI
- Producer: Frank Klepacki

Frank Klepacki chronology
Rocktronic (2004)	Virtual Control (2005)	Awakening of Aggression (2006)

Virtual Control is the third solo album by video game music composer Frank Klepacki, released in 2005 and featuring ten songs.

== Track listing ==
1. He Lives
2. Gar
3. Vegas In Crowd
4. Cigar Bar
5. Smack Dat
6. Frank K is Back
7. Virtual Control
8. Retrophonic
9. Dominate
10. Vengeance Beast

All tracks were written and performed by Frank Klepacki.

== Personnel ==
Frank Klepacki - All instruments and programming
