= The Legend of Kyrandia =

1992 video game

- Developer: Westwood Studios
- Publisher: Virgin Games
- Director: Brett Sperry
- Designers: Michael Legg; Rick Parks; Paul S. Mudra
- Programmer: Michael Legg
- Artist: Rick Parks
- Writer: Coco
- Composer: Frank Klepacki
- Series: Fables & Fiends
- Platforms: Amiga, MS-DOS, FM Towns, Mac, PC-98
- Release: August 1, 1992: MS-DOS; 1992: Amiga; October 1993: FM Towns; 1993: Mac; February 15, 1994: PC-98
- Genre: Graphic adventure
- Mode: Single-player

The Legend of Kyrandia: Book One is a point-and-click adventure game developed by Westwood Studios and published by Virgin Games in August 1992. It was originally released for MS-DOS, then ported to Amiga, FM Towns, Mac, and PC-98. It is the first in the Legend of Kyrandia series, and focuses on players taking on the role of a young prince who must put an end to the tyrannical chaos of an evil court jester.

The game proved a commercial success and was praised for many of its elements. Its success spawned two sequels: The Legend of Kyrandia: Hand of Fate in 1993; and The Legend of Kyrandia: Malcolm's Revenge in 1994.

== Gameplay ==
Players assume the role of Brandon, a young man who happens to be a prince, whose focus is to put an end to an evil threat. The story involves visiting locations, solving puzzles, and talking to people. Players can click on anything to examine and interact with objects and people. Objects can be taken and carried in an inventory—a maximum of ten items can be stored, with the option to drop items in a location for later collection. Locations are viewed in a fixed-isometric viewpoint. The mouse cursor changes around the edges of the main display to indicate if there is an exit available there.

Solving puzzles requires either the right object or a special power. During the game, Brandon acquires an amulet which, upon being empowered, grants him magical abilities to overcome obstacles. The game features various hazardous obstacles and moments that, if handled poorly, can incur an automatic game over; when this happens, players must either start a new game or reload from the last save they made.

== Plot ==
In the kingdom of Kyrandia, the court jester Malcolm is imprisoned by the Mystics - the kingdom's most powerful magic users - for the murders of King William and Queen Katherine, on the belief he sought the power of the Kyragem that the royal family guards. Eighteen years after his imprisonment, Malcolm escapes and uses the power of Kyragem to corrupt the land's magic, effectively sowing chaos across the kingdom. Kallak, leader of the mystics, writes a message to Brynn, a fellow Mystic, instructing her to help his grandson Brandon prepare for the task of stopping Malcolm's evil tyranny. Before he can send the letter to her, Malcolm finds him in his treehouse home and petrifies him in retaliation for his imprisonment.

Brandon, finding his grandfather has been turned to stone, soon learns of the situation when the treehouse forms a face created by the kingdom's land, declaring he must put an end to the evil endangering it. Taking Kallak's note, Brandon seeks out Brynn, who in turn directs him to secure the royal amulet from its hiding place. With it in his possession, Brandon works to restore the magical powers it once had. Meeting with the sage Darm (another Mystic), he receives items to help him reach the alchemist Zanthia, one of the youngest Mystics of the group. Through her, Brandon learns he is the son of William and Katherine, and rightful heir to the throne, and thus the only one who can restore the Kyragem to normal.

With Zanthia's help, Brandon works to create potions to help him reach the castle, recovering one of the royal treasures near her abode. Whilst outside the castle, Brandon pays homage to his parents at their grave, in return receiving the final power for his amulet from Katherine's spirit. In the castle, Brandon overcomes further tricks by Malcolm in order to recover the remaining royal treasures, discovering the other Mystics were captured and petrified in his absence. Using the treasures, Brandon enters the Kyragem vault, and tricks Malcolm into petrifying himself, ending his terror and freeing the land. With Kyrandia saved, Brandon assumes his rightful role as the kingdom's new king, declaring in his first act that sandals shall be the official footwear for the people.

== Development and release ==
Kyrandia was originally a MUD for MajorBBS programmed by Richard Skurnick & Scott Brinker. Westwood Studios purchased the Kyrandia intellectual property. The story was adapted by Rick "Coco" Gush, who called the original designer "a jerk" who "tried to make a stink" after Westwood's franchise became financially successful through their publisher at Virgin.

GOG.com released an emulated version for Microsoft Windows and Mac OS X in 2013.

== Reception ==
According to Gush, The Legend of Kyrandia was commercially successful. He noted that it was "a solid A-minus or B-plus" title that helped to secure Westwood's "new relationship with Virgin". Later bundles with its sequels continued this success. The Legend of Kyrandia series as a whole, totaled above 250,000 units in sales by August 1996.

In 1992, Computer Gaming World's Robin Matthews described The Legend of Kyrandia "as a cross between Loom, King's Quest V and Secret of Monkey Island 2", praising the "beautifully drawn" VGA graphics and humor. Although he considered the storyline as "hardly original", he said that the presentation of the game, the general quality and the feel, make this game a welcome addition to the world of graphic adventures. In April 1994 the magazine said that the CD version "is a quality product throughout" that added digitized voices to the "excellent, if somewhat short" game's "stunning graphics and sound", and advised Westwood to "just release the CD version of their titles first". InfoWorld in 1993 criticized Kyrandia and its sequel for their low level of difficulty and short length. The first installment in the series received 5/5 in Dragon magazine.

Jim Trunzo reviewed Legends and Lore: The Legend of Kyrandia in White Wolf #34 (Jan./Feb., 1993), rating it a 4 out of 5 and stated that "Overall, The Legend of Kyrandia lulls you to the point of overconfidence with its seemingly simplistic theme and approach, only to shock you with a sudden turn of events and a difficult obstacle placed in your path. Gamers will enjoy Kyrandia first for its aesthetic appeal and eventually for its challenge. But they will enjoy it!"
