= Young Merlin =

- Developer: Westwood Studios
- Publisher: Virgin Games
- Composers: Paul Mudra; Frank Klepacki; Dwight Okahara
- Platform: Super NES
- Release: NA: 1993; EU: March 31, 1994
- Genre: Action-Adventure
- Mode: Single-player

Young Merlin is a video game released for the Super NES in 1993. The game follows a young Merlin as he enlists the help of the Lady of the Lake to help him defeat the evil Shadow King.

== Reception ==
Reception

Review scores
Publication	Score
Consoles +	88%
Electronic Gaming Monthly	7.6/10
GamePro	15.5/20
Joypad	90%
M! Games	81%
Official Nintendo Magazine	80/100
Player One	85%
Super Play	77%
Total!	80%
Max Overload!	75%
Nintendo Acción	8/12
Power Unlimited	69%
Super Control	84%

The game was praised by N-Force Magazine who gave the game a review score of 92% and described it as the next Zelda. Electronic Gaming Monthly commented that the game "strikes a good middle ground between fast action and slow RPGs. The levels are huge, the control is good and the graphics are up to the Virgin par." They gave the game a 7.6 out of 10. GamePro similarly praised the controls and graphics but remarked that the gameplay lacks challenge and involves too much walking back and forth. They summarized the game as "a magical, whimsical ride that proves to be more funny than it is challenging" and "a fun and entertaining sidebar to more serious RPGs."
