= Lands of Lore: Guardians of Destiny =

1997 video game

- Developer: Westwood Studios
- Publisher: Virgin Interactive Entertainment
- Designers: Jeff Steven Fillhaber; Jesse Clemit
- Programmers: Scott K. Bowen; Bill Petro
- Artist: Rick Parks
- Writer: Rick Gush
- Composers: David Arkenstone; Frank Klepacki
- Platforms: MS-DOS, Windows
- Release: NA: September 29, 1997; EU: October 17, 1997
- Genre: Role-playing
- Mode: Single-player

Lands of Lore: Guardians of Destiny (Note: Known as Lands of Lore II: Guardians of Destiny in some European countries) is an action role-playing game developed by Westwood Studios for MS-DOS and Windows and published by Virgin Interactive Entertainment in 1997. It is the second installment of the Lands of Lore series, a sequel to Lands of Lore: The Throne of Chaos. It brought about a drastic change in gameplay style from its predecessor, opting away from the original's D&D turn-based style in favor of more action elements. A sequel, Lands of Lore III, was released in 1999.

== Gameplay ==
Similar to its contemporary Realms of the Haunting, Guardians of Destiny is a first-person adventure game which, while featuring occasional combat, revolves around the solving of puzzles. Like in most adventure games, the player can interact with objects and people by clicking on them, collect items into an inventory, and use items from their inventory on environmental objects. However, some puzzles also require the player to cast spells, use their melee attack, or drag objects and even enemy corpses into specific locations.

Navigating through the environment also often involves platforming challenges, some of which can be undertaken only in one specific form. The player character, Luther, has a curse which causes him to randomly change between three forms: human, lizard, and beast. Later in the game the player acquires spells which can be used to change form at will if in human or lizard form; once in beast form Luther must wait to change randomly back to human form, since the beast cannot cast spells. The lizard form is small, allowing it to enter tunnels inaccessible to other forms, but preventing it from crossing even shallow streams of water without drowning. It can run faster and cast spells more easily than other forms. The beast form is tall and heavy, such that it can make only mild jumps, but in some places its size allows it to step across gaps that the other two forms would have to jump over, wade across the deepest body of water, it's also immune to poison and very strong. The human form is an average of the other two in most respects, but is the only form which can equip weapons or armor.

Combat works similarly to The Throne of Chaos, except that the player's party consists of just one character, and most enemies will not attack the player character unless provoked. Luther can use a melee attack, fire a bow at range, use items, and cast spells at four different levels. Each spell has a fifth level which is only usable if Luther consumes an ancient stone or has acquired the Mantle of the Ancients, which occurs at a set point near the end of the game. Spells draw on a limited pool of magic points, which, like Luther's health, is gradually recovered over time.

== Plot ==
In his abode near Gladstone, the Draracle receives a vision of a young girl of the Huline race being cornered by a monsterous creature, seeing this as a sign that the ancient god Belial is returning. Eons ago, Belial, one of the ancient gods of The Lands, was executed for fueling a war between two of the world's races - the Huline and the Dracoids - by supplying powerful weapons to the latter. Before his execution, Belial arranged for a powerful creature to fuel his rebirth, spawning lesser creatures across the world.

In Gladstone, Luther, a young farmer and the son of Scotia, is imprisoned by the kingdom's soldiers following the wake of Scotia's death, accused of being a member of the Dark Army. Unknown to his captors, Luther bears a curse that causes him to morph into either a monster or a lizard against his will; when such a transformation occurs whilst in his cell, he uses the opportunity to escape, fleeing to caverns linked to the Draracle's home - attempting to return to the cavern's entrance leads to Luther being killed by Gladstone's soldiers. Upon encountering the Draracle, Luther is saved, only to learn that his curse can only be cured by finding a wizard within a tribe of Huline on the Southern Continent.

On his travels in the south, Luther encounters the mystic Dawn and her assistant Baccata, a former ally of the hero who defeated Scotia. While they seek his return to Gladstone, both eventually offer help to Luther, upon learning he seeks a means to end his curse. Although he is sent to different locations, he soon learns of the danger coming from Belial's resurrection, forcing him to find his way to the City of the Ancients, where the Old Gods resided. Depending on actions taken in the game, the game ends in one of several ways:

- If Luther fails to escape an armory in Belial's labotory or is killed by Belial, the ancient god overruns the land with creatures in order to conquer them.
- If Luther defeats Belial but performs enough evil actions, he transforms himself into a powerful god to terrorize the land. This path can also see him being killed for his evil actions after Belial's defeat, either by the Draracle, or by Dawn if she is treated badly by Luther.
- If Luther defeats Belial, performing good actions, the Draracle makes plans to rejoin the other Old Gods now that Belial is dead. In passing on his news to Luther, he finds him and Dawn in bed, the pair having become romantically involved. After his departure, the two consummate their relationship.

== Development ==
Because role-playing titles such as The Elder Scrolls II: Daggerfall had recently attained commercial hit status, Westwood opted to "make Lands of Lore 2 one of its flagship titles for the latter half of 1997", according to Next Generation.

To model, texture and animate the monsters in the game's cutscenes, Westwood used 3D Studio, MeshPaint and Photoshop software.

== Reception ==
Reception

Aggregate score
Aggregator	Score
GameRankings	74%

Review scores
Publication	Score
AllGame	4/5
CNET Gamecenter	7/10
Computer Games Strategy Plus	3.5/5
GameRevolution	C+
GameSpot	7.9/10
Next Generation	3/5
PC Gamer (UK)	83%
PC Gamer (US)	87%
PC PowerPlay	92%
PC Zone	92%

The game received above-average reviews. Keith Sullivan of PC Gamer US called it a "very good game", but stated that its engine was dated in comparison to Jedi Knight: Dark Forces II and Quake. Cindy Yans of Computer Games Strategy Plus commended its "excellent" storyline and the characters, and a "rich" world to explore, but was critical to its full-motion video sequences, "awkward" controls and "dated" graphics engine.

A reviewer for Next Generation called Lands of Lore a worthy sequel, but also as part RPG, part adventure. The writer concluded that, while the game "may have its quirks", it is "an entertaining romp" for those willing to overlook the issues. In PC PowerPlay, David Wildgoose hailed it as "perhaps the most complete game" he had played and praised its mixture of genres. He believed that it was "a new level" of quality for Westwood.

PC Zone's Jamie Cunningham called the game "another Westwood masterpiece" while acknowledging some issues in the gameplay. Andy Backer of Computer Game Entertainment summarized the game as "flawed" and "frustrating" but "brilliant" at the same time. Writing for PC Gamer UK, Andy Butcher said that the game offers hours of fun despite its "patchy" nature and "uninspiring" graphics.

In a negative review, Computer Gaming World's Scorpia called the game a "horror" and considered not an RPG, adventure or an action game, but a "patchwork" of all three.

=== Sales ===
The game claimed #11 in the U.S. on PC Data's computer game sales rankings for October 1997. A writer for CNET Gamecenter noted that the game was part of a trend of role-playing successes that month, alongside Ultima Online and Fallout. The game was absent from PC Data's top 20 by November.

On Media Control's computer game sales charts for the German market, the game debuted in second place in the latter half of October. Holding this position in the first half of November, it proceeded to chart in the top 10 through the end of 1997. During 1998, the game remained in the top 20 through the end of February, and placed 40th and 45th in May. At that time, it had maintained an unbroken 28-week streak in the top 50.

=== Awards ===
During the inaugural Interactive Achievement Awards, Guardians of Destiny was a finalist for the Academy of Interactive Arts & Sciences' "PC Role-Playing Game of the Year" award, which ultimately was given to Dungeon Keeper. It was also nominated for the "Best RPG" award at the CNET Gamecenter Awards for 1997, which went to Diablo; and was a runner-up for Computer Gaming World's 1997 "Strategy Game of the Year" award, which ultimately went to Fallout. The game won the award for "RPG" at PC PowerPlay's 1997 Game of the Year Awards.

== Reviews ==
- Backstab #8
