= The Legend of Kyrandia: Hand of Fate =

1993 video game

- MS-DOS cover art
- Developer: Westwood Studios
- Publisher: Virgin Interactive Entertainment
- Director: Rick "Coco" Gush
- Programmer: Michael Legg
- Artist: Rick Parks
- Writer: Rick "Coco" Gush
- Composer: Frank Klepacki
- Series: Fables & Fiends
- Platforms: MS-DOS, FM Towns, PC-98
- Release: 1993: MS-DOS; 1995: FM Towns, PC-98
- Genre: Adventure
- Mode: Single-player

The Legend of Kyrandia: Book Two - Hand of Fate is a 2D point-and-click adventure game, developed by Westwood Studios and published by Virgin Interactive Entertainment in 1993 for MS-DOS. Verions for the FM Towns and PC-98 were published in 1995. It is the sequel to The Legend of Kyrandia (1992) and the second game of the Fables & Fiends series. The game focuses on the story of a young alchemist and magician saving the kingdom of Kyrandia from being wiped from existence.

The game features more whimsical humor than its predecessor, as well as more complex puzzles. It was a commercial success, but was criticized for its short length. A sequel, Malcolm's Revenge, was released in 1994. GOG.com released an emulated version of both for Windows and Mac OS X in 2013.

== Gameplay ==
The cauldron on the main interface allows players to make potions to resolve puzzles.

Players assume the role of Zanthia, a young magic user, who explores lands to solve puzzles and progress the story. Like its predecessor, Hand of Fate does not operate with verb-command system, but a more simplified point-and click mechanic which can be used to interact with objects and people in each location. Objects can be stored in the inventory - which has more space for items than the previous game - with the option to drop objects in a location for later use.

Players can create potions using a cauldron in the interface, once acquired, but only by using the right objects to make them, with each potion varying in the amount of doses they get to use; the cauldron can be emptied before all doses are used if another potion is required. Additional recipes can be acquired by finding missing spell pages during the game. Unlike its predecessor, the player cannot retain all the items they find when moving forward; only certain items are retained for later use. As with the first game, there are hazardous situations that, if not handled correctly, can lead to an automatic game over, forcing players to start anew or reload a previous save file.

== Plot ==
A few years after the events of The Legend of Kyrandia, the kingdom of Kyrandia faces a crisis as pieces of the land begin to disappear suddenly. The Mystics, the kingdom's most powerful magic users, search for answers to explain why this is happening and how to fix it, aided by newcomer Marko and his assistant The Hand - a giant, living gloved left hand. Their search for answers eventually leads to the Hand pointing out that Kyrandia requires a magical anchor stone from the center of the world to save it. To acquire it, Zanthia, the youngest Mystic of the group and a skilled alchemist, is tasked to acquire such a stone for the kingdom. However, to her shock, she finds that her home was ransacked by someone, leaving her unable to create a portal potion to reach her destination.

Finding that some of her older, junior equipment, was hidden near her home by the thief, Zanthia realizes she must find another way to the center of the world, and makes for Morning Mist where she can find passage to a volcano island that links to the center of the world. During this time, Marko discovers the Hand was in possession of one of Zanthia's alchemy tools, but is uncertain why. Zanthia eventually reaches the center of the world, but just as she is about to acquire an anchor stone, Marko appears through a portal to inform her that it is not required. He reveals the Mystics discovered that Kyrandia's situation is tied into the "Wheels of Fate" - something has happened to them, which likely is leading to Kyrandia's doom. Before he can help her reach them, the Hand intrudes and pulls him back through his portal.

Reaching the surface, Zanthia makes her way towards the Wheels of Fate. During this time, she comes across two men seeking to capture a living, disembodied foot. Aiding them, she learns that the Hand is a fragment of a long-deceased gigantic evil sorcerer and is likely trying to revive it by destroying Kyrandia so they can rebuild themselves in the kingdom's void. With this knowledge, Zanthia works hard to reach the Wheels of Fate and discovers the Hand removed a gear that powered the machine keeping Kyrandia in existence. Fixing it, she quickly finds herself confronting the Hand, but manages to defeat it with Marko's help. The pair swiftly return home, with Marko hinting he is in love with Zanthia, much to her surprise.

In a post-credit scene, a storm occurs during one night above Kyrandia, in which a lightning bolt strikes a junkyard near the castle, hitting the statue of Malcolm and freeing him.

== Reception ==
According to writer Rick "Coco" Gush, Hand of Fate was a commercial disappointment, with sales roughly 50% lower than its predecessor had achieved. He blamed this decrease on a "cryptic" advertising campaign directed by "an unbelievably arrogant new VP of marketing", who was fired from Virgin Interactive shortly after the launch. However, the game's later bundle SKU with The Legend of Kyrandia and Malcolm's Revenge contributed "tens of thousands of copies to the sales totals in the first few months", as Gush noted. The Legend of Kyrandia series as a whole, including Hand of Fate, totaled above 250,000 units in sales by August 1996.

Because of its low level of difficulty and short length, InfoWorld in 1993 recommended Hand of Fate to inexperienced adventurers and fans of King's Quest. The magazine concluded that "you will be pleasantly entertained for however long it takes you". The Hand of Fate received 4/5 in Dragon. In 1994, Computer Gaming World's Scorpia approved of The Hand of Fate's avoidance of unwinnable gameplay and "definite improvement in puzzle construction over Kyrandia" although "Westwood is still a little too fond of red herrings". She criticized the game's short length and "really sore point", the arcade endgame, but concluded that Hand of Fate improved on "much of what was wrong with Legend of Kyrandia", and good for anyone looking for a short adventure game.
