= Emperor: Battle for Dune =

2001 video game

- North American cover art
- Developers: Intelligent Games; Westwood Studios
- Publisher: EA Games
- Director: James Steer
- Designers: Jamie Ferguson; Neil Marsden; Gregory Mathews
- Programmer: Philip Veale
- Artists: Richard Evans; Gary Cox
- Composers: Jarrid Mendelson; David Arkenstone; Frank Klepacki
- Series: Dune
- Platform: Microsoft Windows
- Release: NA: June 12, 2001; EU: June 15, 2001
- Genre: Real-time strategy
- Modes: Single-player, multiplayer

Emperor: Battle for Dune is a real-time strategy video game, released by Westwood Studios in June 2001. It is based in Frank Herbert's science fiction Dune universe. It follows its predecessors, Dune II and Dune 2000. While Dune II was a distinct story to that of Dune, and Dune 2000 was a remake of Dune II, Emperor: Battle for Dune is a direct sequel to the previous games. In particular, it is a sequel to Dune 2000, carrying on from where it left off, with several of the characters and actors returning. Like Dune 2000 and many of the other Westwood games that came before it, Emperor features Full Motion Video cut scenes filmed with actors.

== Gameplay ==
The player commands one of three Houses and must fight for control of the spice mélange on the planet Arrakis. The player harvests spice, builds a base, and trains units to destroy one or more enemies similar to the gameplay in previous real-time strategy titles produced by Westwood Studios. Battles begin with a black shroud obscuring unseen portions of the map, and a grey fog of war will gradually obscure portions of the map that are no longer within the sight of the player's units.

Screenshot of Emperor featuring an Atreides base

Each House is given a unique set of units tailored to the character of the House, with the Atreides featuring mechs and sonic weapons, the Harkonnen utilizing tanks and flame weapons, and Ordos units benefiting from energy shields and self-healing. Players can gain access to another Houses' units by capturing an enemy building that can manufacture the desired units. Sub-factions like the Fremen, Ix, Tleilaxu, Guild, and Imperial Sardaukar are introduced during the campaign that may ally with the player, allowing them to build special units. Unlike in Dune 2000 where the campaign map only impacted the design of the next mission's battlefield, in Emperor players are presented with options that could attract or anger sub factions, as well as impact the progression of the overall story.

Each of the three main factions is given a single player campaign with full motion video cut scenes. Multiplayer was also available online, through local area networks, or as skirmish battles against computer opponents.

== Synopsis ==
=== Setting ===
Emperor: Battle for Dune is set shortly after Dune 2000. Emperor Corrino has been killed by his concubine, Lady Elara, and the Landsraad has been thrown into chaos.

=== Plot ===
The Spacing Guild has presented the three remaining Houses (the same as those in the previous games: House Atreides, House Harkonnen and House Ordos) with a unique challenge: a war of assassins on the planet Arrakis. Whichever House wins the war will become the new leader of the Landsraad, and its leader the new Padishah Emperor, Emperor of the Known Universe.

During the campaign, the Tleilaxu are scouring Arrakis with hidden motives, with various probes spotted collecting flesh samples from dead sandworms. After the last battle with any one of the opponent Houses on their home planet, the Spacing Guild leaves the victorious House stranded on the enemies' conquered homeworld, attempting to control Arrakis with House Tleilaxu by genetically engineering an Emperor Worm with immense psychic powers empowered by Lady Elara. They release a mind influencing drug in the remaining forces' water supply on Arrakis to make them slaves under the Guild. A last-ditch attempt must be made back on Arrakis to destroy the Emperor Worm before he awakes, by using the Smugglers Guild to get back to Arrakis. The Emperor Worm is destroyed, and the Spacing Guild's plan is foiled. The victorious house regains control of Arrakis and the spice melange and proclaims their side's leader Emperor of Dune.

=== Subplots ===
While each campaign has the story ultimately culminating up to the battle with the Emperor Worm, the three campaigns have subplots revolving around each faction's intents to conquer Arrakis.

House Atreides' campaign involves regaining the trust of the Fremen, with whom they have had an uneasy relationship due to unspecified past events. Many of the starting missions revolve around forming an alliance with the Fremen. Later on in the campaign, a party of Fremen diplomats are sent to Caladan, where they and the Duke Achillus are under attack by Tleilaxu soldiers. This attack is eventually thwarted and the Fremen pledge their allegiance to House Atreides. The general benevolence of House Atreides is apparent in their motivation for each map's campaign and they have little to no ulterior motives in lending assistance to any of the factions on Arrakis.

House Harkonnen's campaign revolves around the ailing Baron Rakan and his two sons, Gunseng and Copec, who both vie to take the Baron's place upon his death. Copec and Gunseng are at each other's throats, competing for the Baron's favor as the former's grew larger and the latter's days grow shorter. Gunseng eventually goes to Arrakis to oversee the spice mining. Copec grows impatient, however, and poisons Rakan's food. Copec assumes the title, and goes to Arrakis to have his brother swear allegiance to his new baron. Believing that Copec has usurped the title, Gunseng openly rebels against him. The player character chooses to either side with Gunseng or Copec, and both opposing factions battle on Giedi Prime. Depending on who emerges victorious, the game will then feature Gunseng or Copec as the reigning baron of House Harkonnen.

House Ordos' campaign revolves around their ability to create gholas. The house eventually creates a ghola of the deceased Emperor Shaddam Corrino, who will serve as a puppet emperor subservient to House Ordos. Ordos motives are typically insidious in that they attempt to manipulate many of the subhouses (Fremen, Sardaukar, Smugglers) into conflict with the major houses they are fighting, using gholas and other forms of treachery to thwart any attempts at alliance among their enemies and secure alliances for House Ordos. The Ordos are led by the Executrix, four beings that share a single mind and communicate only through a creature known as the "Speaker". The Ordos are calculated in their thinking, almost machine-like. Advising the "Commander" (player) is the equally cold female Mentat Roma Atani.

There are also subplots within subhouses and factions on Arrakis. Ix and the Tleilaxu have made it clear that they cannot be united, and force the player to choose one or the other, though it is possible to have the support of two. A Sardaukar coffin containing a trooper in suspended animation can sometimes be found in the battlefield. These troopers usually ally themselves with the faction that awakens them.

== Cast ==
The game's storyline is told through full motion videos featuring notable actors.

- Michael Dorn as Duke Achillus Atreides
- Mike McShane as Baron Rakan Harkonnen
- Minae Noji as Roma Atani
- Vincent Schiavelli as Mentat Yanich Kobal
- Michael Bailey Smith as Burseg
- Musetta Vander as Lady Elara
- Nicholas Worth as Mentat Kolinar Koltrass

== Reception ==
Reception

Aggregate score
Aggregator	Score
Metacritic	79/100

Review scores
Publication	Score
AllGame	2.5/5
Computer Gaming World	2.5/5
Edge	5/10
EP Daily	7.5/10
Game Informer	8/10
GameRevolution	B+
GameSpot	8.3/10
GameSpy	75%
GameZone	9/10
IGN	8/10
Next Generation	3/5
PC Gamer (US)	89%
X-Play	4/5

The game received "generally favorable reviews" according to the review aggregation website Metacritic.

Jason Kapalka of Computer Gaming World reviewed the game, saying it had "nice graphics, fun cinematics, some interesting units, and a fun interactive campaign map", but panned it for having "outdated graphics, iffy AI and pathfinding, crummy multiplayer, and an overwhelming sense of deja vu" as well as a lack of then standard control features in similar real-time strategy games. Star Dingo of GamePro said, "Emperor brings some cool little ideas to the table, but the game still feels more like a nifty 3D Dune-themed add-on pack for C&C than a whole new Westwood world. The game is well-polished, fast, and fun, however, even if it's not particularly original. Don't mess too much with a good thing, the House Westwood mantra goes." (Note: GamePro gave the game two 4.5/5 scores for graphics and sound, and two 4/5 scores for control and fun factor.) Jason Samuel of NextGen, however, said, "Fans who can't get enough of Westwood's particular brand of RTS or anyone who has missed a Westwood title from the past three or so years will enjoy Emperor: Battle for Dune. Everyone else needs to decide if they want more of what they've seen before."
