= Command & Conquer: Tiberian Sun =

1999 video game

- Developer: Westwood Studios
- Publisher: Electronic Arts
- Producers: Brett W. Sperry; Donny Miele; Rade Stojsavljevic
- Designers: Adam P. Isgreen; Brett W. Sperry; Erik Yeo
- Programmers: Bret Ambrose; Joseph Bostic; Steve Tall
- Artists: Tse Cheng Lo; Eric Gooch; Jim May
- Writers: Donny Miele; Brett W. Sperry; Erik Yeo
- Composers: Frank Klepacki; Jarrid Mendelson
- Series: Command & Conquer
- Platform: Windows
- Release: August 27, 1999
- Genre: Real-time strategy
- Modes: Single player, multiplayer

Command & Conquer: Tiberian Sun is a 1999 real-time strategy video game developed by Westwood Studios, published by Electronic Arts, and released exclusively for Windows in August 1999. The game is the sequel to the 1995 game Command & Conquer. It featured new semi-3D graphics, a more futuristic sci-fi setting, and new gameplay features such as vehicles capable of hovering or burrowing. The main story of the game focuses on a second war between the UN-backed Global Defense Initiative (GDI) and the cult-like Brotherhood of Nod, both seeking to rule over an Earth which is undergoing rapid ecological collapse.

Tiberian Sun was one of the most anticipated games of 1999. Its development suffered numerous delays, with several features being cut before release. However, it was a commercial success and received positive reviews from critics, despite some of the technical bugs in the game. The dark atmosphere, foreboding soundtrack, and slow-paced gameplay of Tiberian Sun received a mixed reception from fans upon release. Its story of a military–industrial complex preoccupied with terrorism rather than environmental failure has been hailed as a metaphor for modern times. Several additional features were added to the game with the Firestorm expansion pack, including new units and a multiplayer global war mode. The game was later succeeded by the 2007 sequel Command & Conquer 3: Tiberium Wars, and was later licensed by Electronic Arts as freeware on February 12, 2010, with a Steam release on March 7, 2024.

== Gameplay ==
GDI forces attacking a Nod base.

Tiberian Sun sees players taking on opponents by building bases, gathering resources, creating armies, and then defeating their opposition by wiping out their units and either capturing or destroying their bases. Gameplay functions similar to the 1995 game, though both playable factions in the games received significant changes to balance out units but retaining notable differences with new structures and units for each - GDI rely on heavy strategic attacks, with new technologies including special defensive walls and units that can traverse bodies of water; Nod rely on unconventional, fanatical methods of attacks, with new technologies including deployable units for defensive purposes and units that can burrow under the ground and emerge behind enemy defences.

The game operates on a new isometric game engine featuring varying level terrain to give the impression of a true 3D environment, and dynamic lighting that simulates day/night cycles and special effects such as ion storms. Some buildings and armored units are rendered with voxels, although infantry is still rendered as sprites. Tiberium, the game's sole resource required to fund construction of structures and units, now consists of two types - the standard green tiberium, and a more valuable blue tiberium - while bridges in the game that are destroyed can be repaired by using a faction's engineer unit on a special hut building connected to the bridge. Crates can be found that convey bonuses such as extra credits, or healing a set number of damaged units.

While the game features network and online multiplayer modes, the game's campaign mode allows players to choose one of two factions who conduct missions across three different theatres of war - North America, Europe, and North Africa. Each faction's campaign features different missions, though a number of these include optional side missions which can be undertaken, and if completed confer a bonus that reduces its difficulty, ranging from additional units, to a reduction in enemy units.

== Plot ==
=== Setting ===
Tiberian Sun involves two factions - the Global Defense Initiative (GDI), and the Brotherhood of Nod - and an alien substance called "Tiberium", and occurs after the events of Command & Conquer. Tiberium has become a serious problem for the world since its arrival in the 1990s, not only in causing a conflict between GDI and Nod over control of the valuable crystals it creates from leeching precious metals from the soil - leading to the First Tiberium War - but also allowing the substance to slowly spread and terraform the planet's ecology and landscape, including causing mutations in humans, the formation of new alien lifeforms, and the development of new weather patterns called Ion Storms. By the 21st century, GDI is focused on researching the means to combat Tiberium's spread, making use of an orbital space station called the Philadelphia to command its forces, while Nod has splintered following the presumed death of its leader Kane, with both factions working to develop new technology to provide each with equal strength in their armies, including armoured walkers, cyborgs, advanced defensive measures, and armoured infantry.

The campaigns of Tiberian Sun focus on a new global conflict erupting in 2030, when Kane returns and re-energises Nod, forcing GDI to combat their efforts, and resulting in the Second Tiberium War. GDI's campaign focuses on the efforts of a commander who must combat the sudden surge of attacks, working alongside a faction of mutants known as "The Forgotten", in order to thwart Kane's latest plans with Tiberium. Nod's campaign focuses on the efforts of an officer who escapes execution by a de facto leader, controlled by GDI, and works to reunite Nod in order to complete Kane's plans.

=== GDI Campaign (Evolutionary Response) ===
GDI commander Michael McNeil is recalled from a training exercise to assist in combating Nod, after being informed by his superior, General James Solomon (player character in the first game), that Kane has returned. McNeil is assigned with initially pushing out Nod forces from GDI territories in North America, led by Nod general and drug lord Vega, before Solomon assigns him to assist a recon team in securing a ship of alien origin that the Brotherhood have taken an interest in. Although the ship is secured, GDI finds it cleaned out by Vega and proceed to track him down, coming across a mutant named Umagon who requests their help in rescuing Tratos, the leader of the Forgotten, who can help explain what Vega stole. Discovering that the ship contained an alien database called the Tacitus that Kane sought, McNeil pursues Vega to his base in Central America. Cornered and learning that Kane has no further use for him, Vega takes a fatal drug overdose before his base is nuked, informing McNeil before he dies that the Tacitus is already being shipped to Nod's base in North Africa.

Learning that Nod is targeting GDI's research in Northern Europe, which focused on creating sonic crystals that can help combat Tiberium's spread, McNeil is assigned to reclaim an important GDI base in the region, before pursuing the stolen crystals. GDI soon learns that Kane has developed chemical missiles that can accelerate the spread of Tiberium across the continent, forcing McNeil to combat the imminent threat it poses along with eliminating a factory developing a new aircraft for the Brotherhood. Eventually, GDI moves towards Egypt to combat Nod at their main base in Cairo, only to learn that Kane's ultimate plan is to launch an ICBM missile containing a warhead of pure, concentrated Tiberium, that can transform the entire planet. Against the advice of Solomon, McNeil launches a direct assault on Kane's base, ultimately destroying the missile and killing Kane, ending the conflict once again, and securing the Tacitus for GDI's research team to analyze.

=== Nod Campaign (Deus ex Kane) ===
Anton Slavik, an officer of Nod's elite unit called "The Black Hand", is arrested by the Brotherhood's new leader Hassan, who is a GDI spy. Before he can be executed, Slavik is rescued by a member of his crew, posing as a Nod journalist, and begins working to reunite Nod in Northern Africa, with the assistance of the Brotherhood's AI CABAL. Shortly after capturing Hassan and ending the internal conflict within the Brotherhood, Slavik reveals him to be a GDI puppet. Before Hassan is executed, Kane announces his return, fully reuniting Nod's splinter factions. Pleased with Slavik's work, Kane assigns him to disrupt a GDI excavation at Nod's former temple in Sarajevo, in order to prevent them locating an alien database and a special project housing it. However, Slavik finds the project missing, having been taken by Vega. Forced to North America to retrieve it, Slavik and his crew recover the missing project and the database (the Tacitus), but are tricked by GDI into attacking a research facility, leading to them being captured.

Imprisoned in a base in Northern Europe, Slavik receives a message from CABAL that a Nod strike force has arrived to rescue him, and executes a plan that leads to his escape. Learning from Kane that he has completed a new missile that will give Nod an ultimate victory and shape the future of the planet, Slavik implements operations to disrupt GDI's research into a new advanced battle walker, and captures a member of a highly advanced GDI base in order to infiltrate it. With Kane's plan nearing completion, Slavik attacks the base, captures it, and uses anti-satellite weapons to destroy the Philadelphia. Kane then launches his missile, achieving ascension and vanishing, while transforming the Earth into a Tiberiumized planet that he had envisioned as humanity's evolutionary future.

== Development ==
Tiberian Sun was announced after the release of the original Command & Conquer, with a trailer featured on its discs. After Virgin Interactive Entertainment was facing financial difficulties and was selling some of its assets, Electronic Arts acquired Westwood Studios in 1998 and published Tiberian Sun, and had no direct part in its development. Tiberian Sun's development was troubled before and after the acquisition, and was delayed numerous times - first for November 1998, then for spring 1999, then ultimately summer 1999. This resulted in a number of engine and gameplay features being omitted from the game, some of which were later included in the Firestorm expansion pack, as well as numerous bugs which have not been fixed even after the patching period.

Several images and references in the Tiberian Sun "rules" file indicate that more features were planned for the release. A former Westwood employee, Adam Isgreen, who was working for Petroglyph Games at the time, elaborated upon them in March and May 2007. Drop-pods were intended to be customizable for GDI before deployment. Lighting was intended to make a huge difference for day/night play, as units spotted by light posts/towers would be susceptible to enemy fire at greater ranges, and in turn would suffer a reduction in their own range ability. Westwood planned the Hunter/Seeker Droid option to support selection of target types, but ultimately the droid was made to attack at random. Developers also did not have enough time to finalize balanced differences in terrain types.

While art direction and balancing worked out according to plan, during development many other problems occurred. For example, the dynamic battlefield with terrain alteration and forest fires was very ambitious, but had to be reduced as it led to unsolvable path finding problems. Also a "loadout" screen was to be implemented, allowing commanders to pick units to take into battle before missions. The idea did not fit into the final project, so it was cut although fully developed. Other unpolished ideas were kept in leading to a lot of feature creep. The game also had planning troubles in post production. Storage and network requirements for the digitized video did not meet the demands. The studio was working with professional actors for the first time. Recording started early when plot lines were not fully developed, but also not subject to change as re-recording would be too expensive and interfere with localisation schedules. The game engine's shift to make it look more 3D and destructible bridges took over ten times longer to program as originally estimated. Adding repairable bridges that can also be passed underneath complicated systems such as path-finding, Z-buffering, rendering, unit behavior, and AI. The bridges became a core element that was used excessively in map design.

Tiberian Sun featured full motion video cutscenes as with the 1995 game, though while the franchise's cutscene director Joseph D. Kucan reprised his role as Kane, the cast of characters created for the game involved a number of well-known Hollywood actors - GDI characters included the actors Michael Biehn and James Earl Jones; Nod characters included Frank Zagarino and Monika Schnarre; and Forgotten characters included the actors Christine Steel, Gil Birmingham, Christopher Winfield and Nils Allen Stewart.

=== Soundtrack ===
Tiberian Sun features a futuristic and ambient soundtrack by Jarrid Mendelson and Frank Klepacki, who composed the signature themes for the movie sequences, as well as the game's musical score with the intention to differ from the original Command & Conquer in order to capture the mood for each mission. Klepacki and Mendelson's soundtrack was released on CD, with only 16 tracks, on November 9, 2005, by EA Recordings (E.A.R.S), excluding the five remaining tracks and the Firestorm tracks.

== Firestorm ==
Tiberian Sun – Firestorm cover art.

Command & Conquer: Tiberian Sun – Firestorm is an expansion pack developed by Westwood for Tiberian Sun, and published by Electronic Arts on March 7, 2000. The expansion pack brings a number of gameplay elements missing from the main game, as well as two new campaigns set after the events of the GDI campaign of the main game, a selection of new units, and the inclusion of a third faction for Skirmish mode and multiplayer. One of the more notable elements brought in by the expansion pack was the return to FMV briefings directed towards the player and a linear storyline combining the campaigns. The game's story focuses on a crisis that slowly emerges when both GDI and Nod try to make use of the AI CABAL to help them with their operations, unaware it is using them for its own schemes.

=== Plot ===
Several months after the Second Tiberium War has concluded, GDI conducts a salvage operation to recover important technology from Kane's former Temple in Cairo, including the alien database known as the Tacitus. Shortly after it is recovered, an ion storm hits the command ship Kodiak carrying it and causes it to crash. Because of a communication blackout with the space station Philadelphia, GDI officer General Paul Cortez assumes temporary command from a ground base, and assigns a commander to recover the database and any survivors at the crash site, whereupon the core is sent to a GDI research team led by Cortez's ex-wife Dr. Gabriella Boudreau, who is working to find the means to counter the spread of Tiberium before the planet becomes too toxic for humans to live on.

Meanwhile, Black Hand leader Anton Slavik faces opposition from several Nod council members to allow him to lead the Brotherhood, and assigns a task force to help him reactivate the Brotherhood's AI CABAL. Once active, CABAL assigns a Nod commander to cause disruptions against GDI settlements, as well as eliminating the mutant leader Tratos, forcing GDI to quell the resultant riot that erupts. Slavik becomes concerned over the assignments his commander received from CABAL and soon orders the AI to be shut down, only for it turn against Nod. GDI, seeking another way to translate the Tacitus with Tratos dead, acquires a core belonging to CABAL in order to use the AI, and soon learn the database is missing a segment. Upon the segment being recovered and connected to the database, CABAL betrays GDI and attacks them with cyborgs, forcing Cortez to order the evacuation of Boudreau's team.

With both GDI and Nod seeking to stop the crisis being caused by CABAL, Cortez orders his forces to prevent the AI from securing humans to be processed into more cyborgs, while Slavik assigns a team to raid a GDI base and secure an EVA unit to replace the rogue AI. Eventually, both sides form a ceasefire in the wake of CABAL's actions, deeming the AI too great a threat to ignore. Both sides launch operations to counter CABAL's forces, and eventually destroy his core, ending the crisis. Boudreau eventually manages to unlock the Tacitus and acquires a vast amount of data, allowing Cortez to provide good news to the rest of GDI command as the communication blackout ends. Meanwhile, Slavik assumes full command of Nod, making certain to continue the Brotherhood in following the visions and prophecies of Kane. Unknown to both sides, CABAL's memory feeds into a hidden cryo-bunker, where Kane resides, recovering from his wounds inflicted towards the end of the Second Tiberium War.

Firestorm follows the events as they unfolded in the GDI ending of Tiberian Sun, with its campaigns no longer structured into two competing storylines but consisting of two different narratives over the same series of events. With Nod fractured into feuding warlords following Kane's death, Anton Slavik is determined to keep Kane's ideology alive through the resurrection of Nod's highly advanced artificial intelligence, CABAL (Computer Assisted Biologically Augmented Lifeform). Meanwhile, the Global Defense Initiative continues its ongoing campaign to stop the spread of Tiberium and its monstrous mutations by retrieving the extraterrestrial Tacitus device, and decides to take control of CABAL to help it decode the device (after Nod, under orders from CABAL, assassinated Tratos, leader of the Forgotten and the only other individual on Earth with the knowledge necessary to translate the Tacitus). Unbeknownst to both GDI and Nod, CABAL has two cores and intentionally allows each faction to take possession of one so that it can simultaneously manipulate both factions to do its bidding. After securing the Tacitus, CABAL goes rogue and attempts to conquer the world through the systematic assimilation of human populations into cyborg armies, forcing GDI and Nod to unite temporarily against it. Upon successfully defeating CABAL, GDI is able to recover the Tacitus and finds a large portion of it having already been translated, bringing new hope to combating Tiberium infestation; in the Nod ending, the defeated CABAL appears to merge with the consciousness of a resurrected/recovering Kane.

== Reception ==
=== Sales ===
Tiberian Sun was highly anticipated since the beginning of its development. It was the fastest selling game on the EA games label, selling 1.5 million copies within a month. In the German gaming magazine PC Player issue 01/2000, Tiberian Sun received a special award as "Most Hyped Game in 1999" (the year the game was released). The earlier Command & Conquer games had been commercial successes in Germany, with sales between 500,000 and 700,000 units in the region. Within eight days of release, it received a "Platinum" award from the Verband der Unterhaltungssoftware Deutschland (VUD), indicating sales of at least 200,000 units across Germany, Austria and Switzerland. This performance set records in Germany, according to the VUD. The committee raised it to "Double-Platinum" status (400,000 sales) by the end of June 2000, which made it the third computer game ever to receive the designation. Tiberian Sun sold over 1 million copies by October 12, after having shipped 1.5 million for its launch. It sold 2.4 million before the release of Red Alert 2.

In the United States, Tiberian Sun sold 419,533 copies by the end of 1999, for revenues of $18.62 million. This made it the region's sixth-best-selling and fourth-highest-grossing computer game of 1999. It sold another 283,544 units ($8.08 million) in the country during 2000. In the United Kingdom, it remained the sixth-best-selling computer game of all time by 2006.

=== Critical reviews ===
Reception

Aggregate score
Aggregator	Score
GameRankings	79.68% (Tiberian Sun); 72.89% (Firestorm)

Review scores
Publication	Score
GameSpot	7.9/10; 7.6/10 (Firestorm)
IGN	8/10; 7.4/10 (Firestorm)
Next Generation	3/5
PC Gamer	92/100 (Tiberian Sun); 84/100 (Firestorm)

Tiberian Sun was voted #29 in PC Gamer magazine's Readers All-Time Top 50 Games Poll in the April 2000 issue. GameGenie.com rated the game 5/5: "This game is worth much more than what you pay, because if you look at everything that has been put together in this game, you'll see how truly awesome it is. My point, and bottom line, is that just about anyone can enjoy this game. They may not sit down and play it for hours on end every day like a large number of war gamers will, but they still can watch the movies and play around with the units enough that they'll have fun. I heartily recommend this game to everyone".

Daniel Erickson reviewed the PC version of the game for Next Generation, rating it three stars out of five, and stated: "Bottom Line: Westwood has fine tuned Command & Conquer, but that's not enough to please the RTS-crazed gaming public".

GameSpot noted that the new soundtrack is "catchy", and stated that the game is an excellent sequel to the original Command & Conquer.

Despite some of the game's technical issues, many reviewers considered the interactive environment, new graphics, new array of units, new concepts, single-player (story wise) and the popular multi-player to be the significant high-points of Tiberian Sun, and credited it with high rankings.

Command & Conquer: Tiberian Sun was named as a finalist by the Academy of Interactive Arts & Sciences for "Computer Game of the Year" and "Computer Strategy Game of the Year" during the 3rd Annual Interactive Achievement Awards, both of which ultimately went to Age of Empires II: The Age of Kings.
