= Lands of Lore III =

1999 video game

- Developer: Westwood Studios
- Publisher: Electronic Arts
- Designer: Jeff Steven Fillhaber
- Programmer: Scott K. Bowen
- Writer: Rick Gush
- Composers: David Arkenstone; Frank Klepacki
- Platform: Microsoft Windows
- Release: NA: April 2, 1999; EU: June 26, 1999
- Genre: Role-playing
- Mode: Single-player

Lands of Lore III is a 1999 action role-playing game developed by Westwood Studios and published by Electronic Arts. It is a sequel to Lands of Lore: Guardians of Destiny and the third game overall in the Lands of Lore video game series. The game set uses a first person perspective with a hack and slash combat system, and it features four "guilds" that the player may join to determine what quests the player will complete. Lands of Lore III was first announced in February 1998, and it received mixed reviews after release.

== Gameplay ==
Set in a first person perspective, the game mechanics work as hack and slash when utilizing melee weapons and as first-person shooter when using spells and ranged weapons. It uses many common elements of RPGs such as the guilds the player can join, having both weapons and magic attacks, and several portal worlds. Casting spells consumes magic points from the player character's limited store, but both magic points and hit points are gradually recovered over time, as in the previous games of the series.

The player can collect weapons, armour and other items such as food. There is an inventory screen, but the player can also open up the inventory bag without leaving the adventuring screen. As time passes, the player character's hunger level decreases, and it can only be refilled by consuming food. If the hunger level is low, the player character no longer recovers magic points and hit points over time, and his combat abilities are impaired. Using abilities leads to levelling up in the guild that specialises in that particular ability, and higher levels unlock more skills.

=== Guilds ===
There are four guilds: a warriors' guild, a magicians' guild, a clerics' guild, and the illegal thieves' guild. Each one has its own set of quests to accomplish, a familiar (a creature who accompanies and assists the player throughout the game), and a guild building containing shops, guild masters and sometimes training areas. The avatar, Copper, must join at least one, but has the option to join the others also.

== Plot ==
The story takes place some time after Guardians of Destiny, but how much time is never indicated. With Belial vanquished, the Draracle no longer serves a function in the mortal plane and returns to the realm of the gods. Copper LeGré, the son of Eric and fourth in the line of succession, whose uncle Richard rules the Lands, witnesses his father and two half brothers being slain by a rift hound during Copper's first boar hunt. Copper's own soul is torn from his body. As a result, Copper must not only retrieve his soul, but also settle the allegations now leveled against him as he was the only survivor. As the new sole heir to the Kingdom of Gladstone, many believe he orchestrated the death of his father and brothers. Coupled with that, Copper is the result of an illicit affair between his father and a Dracoid barmaid—a half-breed heir. He must also seek out answers to help close new rifts that have appeared throughout the Lands.

While exploring one of the rifts, Copper runs into a remnant of the Draracle, who explains that due to his departure, the mirror sealing away the Shining Path between worlds has broken. As a result, other worlds are leaking in, and will eventually destroy the Lands by corruption. Copper's soul is in one of these rift worlds, but he cannot be reunited with it unless the mirror is restored, thus closing the rifts. The story unfolds over five portal worlds from which Copper has to retrieve lost shards of the mirror. Copper is on a quest to recover his soul as well as to save his home and world, but Richard does not believe the rifts are a dire threat, and so offers little assistance. The Draracle's mortal assistant, Jakel, also argues that seeking out the shards is a mistake.

After recovering most of the shards, Copper returns to find that Gladstone has been reduced to ruins by the leakage from other worlds and King Richard has fled into the surrounding forests, leaving Lord Jeron (spelled Geron in Lands of Lore: The Throne of Chaos) to look after the remaining residents. Ailing from wounds and beset by creatures from other worlds, Richard at last realizes how grave is the need to restore the mirror, and gives Copper a writ for all the equipment and money he needs. However, Jeron refuses to honor it, believing Richard is not in his right mind due to his illness. Copper nonetheless recovers the last of the shards, but Jakel blocks him from returning directly from the rift world to the Draracle Caves where the mirror must be assembled.

Copper makes his way to the Draracle Caves and confronts Jakel, who says that if the mirror is restored, the caves will be destroyed and it will become impossible for gods to visit the mortal plane again. Copper is unconvinced, certain that mortals will be exterminated if the rifts are not closed, and battles Jakel to the death to recover the seal. He restores the mirror, which causes him to be reunited with his soul. As Jakel warned, it also causes the Draracle Caves to collapse.

The story jumps ahead some months. Gladstone has been rebuilt, and King Richard has returned to full health, but there has been no sign of Copper since the seal was restored, and he is presumed dead. The story then jumps back to when the seal was restored, and reveals that Copper survived the cave-in. He then ran into Jeron, who was fleeing Gladstone after stealing the Ruby of Truth, and killed him.

The game ends with a flashback revealing that Richard taught Copper how to hunt boar in preparation for the hunt at the beginning of the game. Why Copper never returned to Gladstone, and how the line of succession is resolved following the disappearance of the sole heir, are questions left unanswered as teasers for a prospective fourth game.

== Development ==
The game was announced in February 1998.

== Reception ==
Reception

Aggregate score
Aggregator	Score
GameRankings	62%

Review scores
Publication	Score
AllGame	3.5/5
CNET Gamecenter	6/10
Computer Games Strategy Plus	3/5
Computer Gaming World	2/5
Game Informer	6/10
GamePro	3.5/5
GameRevolution	C
GameSpot	4.3/10
IGN	4.9/10
PC Accelerator	4/10
PC Gamer (UK)	59%
PC Gamer (US)	64%

The game received mixed reviews according to the review aggregation website GameRankings.
