= Command & Conquer: Red Alert 2 =

2000 video game

- Developer: Westwood Pacific
- Publisher: EA Games
- Designers: Dustin Browder; John Hight; Brett W. Sperry
- Programmer: Henry Yu
- Artist: Chris Ashton
- Composer: Frank Klepacki
- Series: Command & Conquer: Red Alert
- Platform: Microsoft Windows
- Release: NA: October 25, 2000; EU: October 27, 2000
- Genre: Real-time strategy
- Modes: Single-player, multiplayer

Command & Conquer: Red Alert 2 is a real-time strategy video game released for Microsoft Windows on October 25, 2000, as the follow-up to Command & Conquer: Red Alert. Red Alert 2 picks up after the Allied campaign of the first game. Its expansion pack is Command & Conquer: Yuri's Revenge, released a year later in 2001. Red Alert 2 was principally developed by Westwood Pacific in collaboration with Westwood Studios.

Command and Conquer: Red Alert 2 contains two playable factions, the Soviets and the Allies, which both previously appeared in Command & Conquer: Red Alert. The single-player campaign is structured in an alternate-ending mode instead of a progressive story mode. Like its predecessor, Red Alert 2 features a large amount of full-motion video cutscenes between missions and during gameplay, with an ensemble cast including Ray Wise, Udo Kier, Kari Wuhrer, and Barry Corbin.

Red Alert 2 was a commercial and critical success, receiving a rating of 86% from GameRankings. It released with a collector's edition. A sequel, Command & Conquer: Red Alert 3, was released in 2008.

== Gameplay ==
The main objective of the game is to defeat enemy commanders, played by AI or human opponents, by destroying their bases to the point of enemy capitulation. Players must also work to defend their own bases to maintain their ability to collect money and produce units, both of which are essential in achieving the main objective. Once all enemy commanders have been defeated, a winner is declared.

Every aspect of gameplay in the game is based on the collection of money. In the game, money can be collected by several means. The most common is using miner trucks to gather ore and/or gems and transport them to a refinery. A player can also gain a lasting income by capturing oil derricks (neutral buildings that are present in some maps). There also are two one-time sources of money for Allied and Soviet players, namely, collecting random crates present on the map and selling off buildings controlled by the player. Allied players have a third one-time source of money, which involves using a spy to steal an opposing player's money. The money is spent on constructing and repairing buildings and units. In both cases, players may start construction before having the full cost in one's reserves, as construction simply pauses if a player runs short of money.

The various nations are members of either the Soviet or the Allied factions, which are loosely based on the real-life factions of the Cold War; furthermore, after installing Yuri's Revenge expansion, you will be able to play a new campaign, you will also be able to play as the Yuri faction in skirmishes. Yuri's Revenge also brings updates to existing Soviet and Allied troops while also bringing in some new troops with their unique voice lines. One of the major praises of Red Alert 2 over the original Red Alert game was that playing as a specific country made a bigger difference. While every country has the basic buildings and units, each nation has a special unique unit, ability, or structure.

It is also the first C&C RTS to not include a "mission select" screen before levels that change the conditions of the next level.

=== Game balance ===
Like previous Command & Conquer games, the two factions in Red Alert 2 have unique armies with their own strengths and weaknesses. To achieve victory, a player must play to their faction's strengths and exploit the other faction's weaknesses. The factions follow the same trend in the previous title.

Soviet vehicles tend to possess heavier firepower and/or being able to take more punishment compared to their Allied counterparts with examples such as the Heavy Rhino Tank and its V3 Rocket Launchers. However, they are also more expensive to build and at times move more slowly, allowing Allied vehicles to out-maneuver and outnumber them. The basic Soviet infantry, on the other hand, the Conscript, though much inferior to the Allied G.I., are incredibly inexpensive and far faster to train making it easy to mass-produce. The Soviet faction is also superior in the early game and in land wars because of their more powerful and advanced tanks, while the Allied faction is better in the late game with more advanced units, such as those used in naval warfare. In particular, the Soviets are better for early game rushes, which are very common in online games.

=== Single-player ===
A small Allied base at the beginning of a game. The player is preparing to place a "Pillbox" defensive structure.

In single-player mode, the player can either compete in one of three campaigns or compete in Skirmish mode where the battle rules and settings can be customized.

Red Alert 2 contains three campaigns. Boot Camp, Allied, and Soviet. Each campaign is distinct in its own way. Boot Camp is simply a tutorial campaign consisting of two missions in which the player is introduced to the fundamentals of the game with the use of Allied forces. If played, Boot Camp leads into the Allied Campaign chronologically. Allied and Soviet campaigns are the two main campaigns of the game, each consisting of twelve missions in which the player faces off against one or more computer-controlled opponents. In some missions, the objective is simply to defeat all opposing forces in the area; other missions have more specific objectives, such as capturing or destroying a particular enemy structure or defending a particular structure of the player's own from enemy attacks. While fundamentally different in story and units, both Campaigns are structured similarly. Both begin with the player operating a limited base or otherwise a Mobile Construction Unit to start from scratch plus a platoon of certain units, but in a few missions, construction is not required.

Skirmish mode is essentially the free-for-all multiplayer mode played against computer-controlled opponents. The player chooses a map against as many players as the map supports. The player can also change settings such as the number of starting units, the monetary levels at the beginning, game speeds and the availability of superweapons. There are no special objectives, just eliminate all enemies units and structures.

=== Multiplayer ===
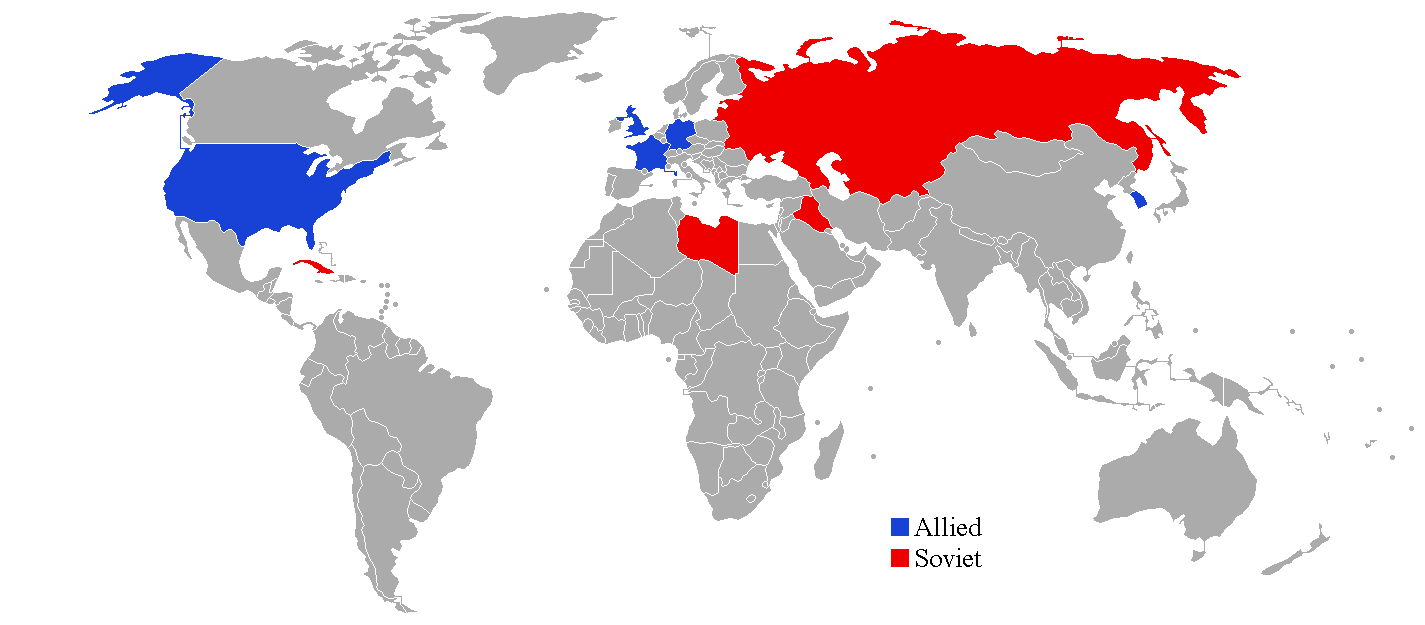
Blue: playable Allied nations Red: playable Soviet nations

Red Alert 2 includes two different multi-player modes. One, LAN allows the player to play alongside friends and others without the use of an internet connection. The other, Online Play allows the player to play across the internet and against players from across the globe. LAN play allows for only Skirmish Mode that is available in single-player. Online play allows for tournaments, private games, public games, ladder ranking games and also contains a chat system. In 2005, control of online play for Red Alert 2 and a number of older C&C games was passed over from EA to XWIS, a community-run server. Multiplayer, as of August 2025, is still active through CnCNet.

== Synopsis ==
=== Setting ===
Like previous Command & Conquer real-time strategy games, Command & Conquer: Red Alert 2 contains two separate campaigns with distinct story lines, one for each playable faction.

Red Alert 2 is set in the same alternative history universe as Red Alert in which Adolf Hitler was erased from history by Albert Einstein who travelled to the past through a Time Machine. However, although Hitler is gone, the Soviet Union has taken place of Nazi Germany to launch World War II. Joseph Stalin attempted to conquer Europe, but was defeated by the Allied nations and their military destroyed. Fearing that a regime change would cause mass unrest in the Soviet Union, the victorious Allies installed Alexander Romanov, a distant relative of Tsar Nicholas II, as the puppet Soviet Premier. Romanov acquiesces to the Allies' demands at first, though he builds up the Soviet military for "defense purposes" – a cover for an intended invasion of the United States.

The game's story line starts off in 1972, with the United States Armed Forces caught completely off guard by the sudden massive Soviet invasion of the United States, with Soviet aircraft, naval vessels, amphibious forces, and paratroopers coming in on both the East Coast and West Coast and with the majority of Soviet ground forces coming in through Mexico, starting World War III. The U.S. attempts to retaliate with the use of nuclear missiles, but Yuri, leader of the Soviet Psychic Corps and Premier Romanov's top advisor, uses his mind control to manipulate the personnel charged with launching the warheads and leaves them to explode in their silos. Within hours, the U.S. is overrun with Soviet Army troops. The player either takes the role of an American Commander, tasked by General Ben Carville with defending the United States, or a Soviet Commander leading the invasion for Premier Romanov. Choosing different factions for the campaign will lead to different storylines and endings.

=== Allied campaign ===
The Allied Commander is sent to New York City with a special forces team led by Special Agent Tanya Adams to repel a Soviet invasion there and then to Colorado Springs to liberate the Air Force Academy and the air base there. As they return victorious, they discover that a Soviet mind control device known as the Psychic Beacon has been deployed in Washington, D.C., forcing the president and General Carville to surrender. The Commander frees them from control and the government goes into exile in Canada.

When the Soviets put another psychic device in Chicago, the Psychic Amplifier, which could control the whole country, the Allies free the city from their Canadian base by destroying the Amplifier. The Soviet chief commander, General Vladimir, retaliates by detonating a nuclear missile in the city. Alarmed, the leaders of France, Germany, and the United Kingdom agree to help the U.S. if they disarm the Soviet nuclear missile silos threatening them in Poland which the Commander and Tanya handle at the behest of the president. Now bolstered by additional men and equipment, the U.S. military is able to launch an amphibious assault on Soviet-occupied Washington, D.C. and recapture the city. After defending Pearl Harbor from Soviet assault, the Allied forces liberate St. Louis and all of the Mississippi River south of the city from psychic control and thwart Soviet attempts to replicate the Allied prism technology that creates massive energy beams to destroy units.

After General Carville tasks the Commander to defend Albert Einstein's laboratory which holds a prototype Chronosphere which can teleport troops anywhere in the world, he is killed by a Soviet suicide bomber. Einstein determines the best place to build the Chronosphere is on a tiny island in the Florida Keys, not far from Soviet Cuba. The Allies use the Chronosphere's teleportation capabilities to take an Allied strike team to Moscow where they successfully destroy the defenses around the Kremlin and teleport in a strike team led by Tanya that captures Premier Romanov, leading to the Soviets' surrender.

=== Soviet campaign ===
Premier Alexander Romanov briefs the Commander about the upcoming Soviet invasion of the United States. The Commander leads an invasion into Washington, D.C. and destroys the Pentagon. Another Soviet invasion is launched into Florida to destroy a U.S. fleet which was threatening the Soviet invasion of the East Coast. Despite this, the Soviet chief commander, General Vladimir, is credited with the success of those campaigns. While Vladimir is back in Moscow, Romanov's top advisor, Yuri, recommends the Commander could prove his worth by taking control of New York City using a Psychic Beacon. When Allied forces from South Korea launch an amphibious attack on Vladivostok, the Commander successfully repels the Allies, leading Germany and France to send troops to the German-Polish border to defend from Soviet aggression. The Commander takes advantage of this by conquering Paris, using the Eiffel Tower as a massive Tesla coil to destroy the city. With this, the European Allies are forced to withdraw their support for the United States.

In the meantime, Yuri has been using his psychic abilities to control Romanov, who gives him control of the military, much to the disgust of General Vladimir. Yuri dismisses Vladimir and tasks the Commander with establishing a base on the Hawaiian Islands. When the Allies try to use their Chronosphere to attack a Soviet research facility in the Ural Mountains, the Commander successfully defends the facility. Shortly afterwards, Yuri tells the Commander that Vladimir killed Romanov. Declaring Vladimir a traitor and a "nonperson", Yuri orders the Commander to capture Vladimir in the White House. After Vladimir's capture and execution, the Commander successfully captures the U.S. president and destroys the Allied superweapon: the weather control device, capable of creating powerful thunderstorms that destroy heavily armored structures.

Impressed by the Commander's victories, Yuri invites them back to Moscow to thank them but their aide, Lt. Zofia, reveals that Romanov recorded a message before his death in which he reveals that Yuri was controlling him and orders them to bring Yuri to justice. The Commander attacks Moscow with the bulk of the Soviet army and destroys the Kremlin, seemingly killing Yuri. They then use information from Yuri's files to destroy the Allied last-ditch effort to assault the Soviet Union using another Chronosphere, effectively becoming the ruler of the world. In the final cutscene, it is revealed that Yuri has survived, his brain floating in a glass jar filled with water and telepathically communicates to the commander, saying: "It would have been good to see inside your mind, General. I still may get the chance...", setting the stage for Command & Conquer: Yuri's Revenge.

=== Cast ===
- Ray Wise as President Michael Dugan
- Barry Corbin as Gen. Ben Carville
- Kari Wuhrer as Special Agent Tanya Adams
- Athena Massey as Lt. Eva Lee
- Larry Gelman as Albert Einstein
- Nicholas Worth as Premier Alexander Romanov
- Udo Kier as Yuri
- Adam Gregor as Gen. Vladimir
- Aleksandra Kaniak as Lt. Zofia

== Development ==
Unlike previous entries in the franchise, Red Alert 2 was developed by Westwood Pacific. Westwood Studios, the original developers of the Command & Conquer franchise were involved in a collaborative role due to other commitments at the time. Despite its limited involvement, only Westwood Studios' name appeared on the packaging for the game.

== Soundtrack ==
The Red Alert 2 soundtrack was composed by long-time Command & Conquer collaborator Frank Klepacki.

== Reception ==
=== Sales ===
In the United States, Red Alert 2 debuted at No. 1 on PC Data's computer game sales chart for the October 22–28 period. Holding the position in its second week, the title became October's ninth-biggest computer game seller, according to PC Data. It proceeded to maintain an unbroken streak in the firm's weekly top 10 through the end of 2000, and to claim No. 1 and No. 7 for the overall months of November and December, respectively. Red Alert 2's domestic sales totaled 334,400 units by year's end, which drew revenues of $13.2 million. PC Data ultimately named it the United States' 13th-best-selling computer title of 2000. It took 14th for 2001, with sales of 388,893 units and revenues of $15 million.

In the United States, the game sold 810,000 copies and earned $26.9 million by August 2006, after its release in October 2000. It was the country's 11th best-selling computer game between January 2000 and August 2006. Combined sales of all Command & Conquer strategy games released between January 2000 and August 2006, including Red Alert 2, had reached 4.3 million units in the United States by the latter date. Red Alert 2 received a "Platinum" sales award from the Entertainment and Leisure Software Publishers Association (ELSPA), indicating sales of at least 300,000 copies in the United Kingdom.

In the German market, Red Alert 2 was expected to be a commercial success. PC Player's Martin Schnelle predicted that it could be the best-selling game of the 2000 holiday season. It debuted at No. 1 on Media Control's computer game sales rankings for October 2000, and held this spot the following month. The Verband der Unterhaltungssoftware Deutschland (VUD) presented Red Alert 2 with a "Gold" award at the end of November, indicating sales of at least 100,000 units across Germany, Austria and Switzerland. After taking fourth place in December, the game remained in Media Control's top 10 through February 2001, and in the top 14 through March. Red Alert 2 had sold roughly 180,000 units in the German region by May, a figure with which Electronic Arts was "very pleased", according to Udo Hoffman of PC Player.

While Red Alert 2's sales in the German market were strong, the game was less successful than its predecessor Command & Conquer: Tiberian Sun. Discussing the performance of Red Alert 2 and its contemporary hits, Herman Achilles of the VUD described a "noticeable drop in sales, especially among mega sellers", which he attributed to growing piracy rates. Tom Meier of the German retailer PC Fun believed the game's lower demand was caused by players' "widespread disappointment" with Tiberian Sun. Hoffman wrote that Meier "had to open his shop half an hour earlier to cope with the crowds" for Tiberian Sun, while Red Alert 2 "was just a sale among many".

The Command & Conquer: The Ultimate Collection bundle has Red Alert 2 and is still available to play.

=== Critical reviews ===
Reception

Aggregate scores
Aggregator	Score
GameRankings	86%
Metacritic	84/100

Review scores
Publication	Score
GamePro	4.4/5
GameSpot	8.5/10
IGN	9.3/10
Next Generation	4/5

Gary Whitta reviewed the PC version of the game for Next Generation, rating it four stars out of five, and stated that "much better than Tiberian Sun, Red Alert 2 proves that Westwood can still cut it when it comes to realtime strategy – just don't expect a whole new ball game".

Red Alert 2 received mostly positive reviews, with IGN calling it "outstanding" and GamePro's Editor's Choice. One reviewer on GamePro noted that "it's not the most innovative game, but with its solid gameplay and alternate Cold War storyline, Command & Conquer: Red Alert 2 is the best 2D real-time strategy game since StarCraft".

After the September 11 attacks, the game's cover art was redesigned to remove the depiction of a plane heading toward the World Trade Center and to swap the American flag on the front cover with a mushroom cloud. EA offered retailers an opportunity to exchange their copies with a version that bore the revised cover art. Despite the repackaging, the World Trade Center continued to be present in the game's campaign, with the Soviet campaign giving the players the option to occupy and even destroy the buildings.

PC Gamer US named Red Alert 2 the best real-time strategy game and the best multiplayer game of 2000.

During the 4th Annual Interactive Achievement Awards, the Academy of Interactive Arts & Sciences nominated Red Alert 2 for the "Game of the Year", "PC Game of the Year", "PC Strategy", and "Online Gameplay" awards.
