= The Legend of Kyrandia: Malcolm's Revenge =

1994 video game

- North American cover art
- Developer: Westwood Studios
- Publisher: Virgin Interactive Entertainment
- Director: Rick Gush
- Programmers: Michael Grayford; Michael Legg
- Writer: Rick Gush
- Composer: Frank Klepacki
- Series: Fables & Fiends
- Platforms: DOS, Macintosh
- Release: 1994
- Genre: Adventure game
- Mode: Single-player

The Legend of Kyrandia: Book Three - Malcolm's Revenge is a 2D point-and-click adventure game, developed by Westwood Studios and published by Virgin Interactive Entertainment in 1994. It is the sequel to The Legend of Kyrandia: Hand of Fate, and the third and final game in the Fables & Fiends series. The game sees players take on the role of the antagonist from the first game in the series, who begins plotting his revenge against those who thwarted him, only to find himself eventually seeking to prove his innocence of a murder he did not commit.

The game functioned with the same point-and-click interface used in previous titles, but with the ability for the lead character to switch between different personalities to solve puzzles and a point-based system. Westwood also developed the game with a special video encoding method that formatted into .VQA (Vector Quantized Animation) file format. Malcolm's Revenge received mixed reviews on its release, while achieving less sales due to Westwood's decision to focus on Command & Conquer by the mid 1990s. GOG.com released an emulated version for Microsoft Windows and Mac OS X in 2013.

== Gameplay ==
The game functions on the same point-and-click interface used in previous games in the series, rather than complex interface mechanics, in which players can interact with objects, the environment and people by simply clicking on them. Objects can be stored within an inventory for use to solve puzzles, with it possible to drop items in a game's scene for remove them or to leave them for later collection; at times in the game, the inventory is cleared of items, some of which can be found later on. Malcolm's Revenge differs from its predecessors by including a point-based system which awards points for performing specific actions during the game, and a "laughter-track" when the protagonist performs or makes comedic references. In addition, the player can also switch the protagonist between three personalities - truthful, normal, and deceitful - in which the right personality can help in solving some of the game's puzzles; at a specific point, the player has to make a choice out of three, with two of these fixing the personality to a specific one as a direct result.

== Plot ==
Years before Fables and Fiends, Malcolm lived a simple childhood guided by his good conscience Stewart and his evil conscience Gunther. As Malcolm grew, he slowly began to be unruly and playing tricks, which Stewart disapproved of Gunther advising him to do. Eventually the two consciences fought over control of Malcolm, resulting in Stewart being cast away and Gunther taking sole control in guiding Malcolm. Over the years, Malcolm continued to cause trouble, before becoming the court jester for King William and Queen Catherine of Kyrandia. After the royal rulers were murdered, Malcolm was wrongly accused of the crime, causing him to retaliate against the kingdom until his defeat at the hands of Brandon, William's and Catherine's son, and Kallak, leader of the kingdom's magic users known as Mystics.

Imprisoned as a statue by a spell he tried to use, Malcolm was dumped in a junkyard outside the castle, until a storm frees him following the events of Hand of Fate. Seeking revenge, Malcolm begins working to find a way off of Kyrandia, knowing his return will attract unwanted attention and efforts to imprison him. Finding the means to travel to the Isle of Cats, Malcolm recruits the aid of a pirate captain by securing a magical spell that can turn people into anthropomorphic mice. With the pirates' aid, Malcolm storms back to Kyrandia, only to be betrayed by them. Deeming him too great a problem, Brandon and Kallak punish Malcolm by sending him to the edge of the world.

Upon arriving, Malcolm climbs down the edge, only to knock himself out and recover in Limbo, entrapped as a servant to the realm's queen. Managing to reach the Underworld, Malcolm is released from the collar the queen uses to summon him, but learns he cannot stay. Given transport to the surface, Malcolm returns to Kyrandia, in the process reuniting with Stewart. At this point, Malcolm is forced to decide on which conscience to have, or to have both work for him. After dealing with the matter, Malcolm discovers Kyrandia in ruins, and the pirates in control after using the spell Malcolm found. Deciding to save the kingdom from his actions, Malcolm tricks the pirates' captain into accepting a gem for part of a ransom and giving him the collar, ending the pirates' rule.

Seeking to prove to Kyrandia he was innocent of the murders of their former rulers, Malcolm finds the means to summon William's spirit, and using him in his trial amongst the inhabitants. William proves to Brandon and Kallak that Malcolm was innocent, explaining he died as the result of a cursed blade that killed anyone of royal Kyrandian blood that handled it, while revealing Malcolm to be his cousin. Embarrassed, Kallak and Brandon grant Malcolm a pardon for his crimes, allowing him to finally enjoy his freedom. As he prepares to take a nap, Malcolm is suddenly confronted by the head warden of the kingdom's prison who presents to him his son, much to his shock.

== Reception ==
Reception

Review scores
| Publication | Score |
|---|---|
| Next Generation | 4/5 |
| PC Gamer (US) | 88% |
| Macworld | 3/5 |
| CD-ROM Today UK | 3.5/5 |

Awards
| Publication | Award |
|---|---|
| PC Gamer US | Best Adventure Game 1994 (nominated) |
| Electronic Entertainment | Best Adventure Game 1994 |

According to designer Rick Gush, Malcolm's Revenge was under-marketed by management, as "the brass at Westwood did not care about anything else" by this point, except Command & Conquer. Despite this problem, he estimated the game as a commercial success, with sales above those of Fables and Fiends and Hand of Fate combined. The game's later bundle SKU with its two predecessors contributed "tens of thousands of [additional] copies to the sales totals in the first few months", as Gush noted. The Legend of Kyrandia series as a whole, including Malcolm's Revenge, totaled above 250,000 units in sales by August 1996.

Scorpia of Computer Gaming World called Malcolm's Revenge a refreshing game in many ways, but also frustrating at the same time.

Malcolm's Revenge won Electronic Entertainment's 1994 "Best Adventure Game" award. PC Gamer US nominated Malcolm's Revenge for its 1994 "Best Adventure Game" award, but it lost to System Shock.

Next Generation commended the game's "brilliant" visuals, a "great" sense of humor, and "challenging" puzzles.
