= Hyper Duel =

1993 video game

- Developer: Technosoft
- Publisher: Taito (Note: Sega Saturn port was published by Technosoft)
- Artist: Mitsuakira Tatsuta
- Composer: Hyakutaro Tsukumo
- Platforms: Arcade, Sega Saturn
- Release: Arcade: JP: October 1993; Saturn: JP: November 22, 1996
- Genre: Horizontal-scrolling shooter
- Modes: Single-player, multiplayer
- Arcade system: TEC442-A

Hyper Duel (Note: Japanese: ハイパー デュエル, Hepburn: Haipā De~yueru) is a 1993 horizontal-scrolling shooter video game developed by Technosoft and released for arcades in Japan by Taito. A Sega Saturn port was published in 1996. The player controls one of three characters piloting transformable fighters called Buster Gears, whose mission is to recover or destroy a prototype unit stolen by terrorist forces. The player can switch between a compact spaceship and a humanoid mecha. The game runs on the TEC442-A arcade system board.

Hyper Duel was Technosoft's first original arcade game, reminiscent of its Thunder Force series, and was created by new employees who would later work on Thunder Force V. Planning for the game began from the design phase of the TEC442-A board. The Saturn port was made by ten staff members in a matter of months. The soundtrack was scored by Hyakutaro Tsukumo as his first video game project. Working Designs planned to release the game in North America under their "Spaz" label, but cancelled the deal with Technosoft and dropped support for the Saturn following a dispute with Sega.

Hyper Duel on the Saturn received average reviews, with critics finding the gameplay simple but satisfying and the strategic element of switching between the craft's two modes well implemented. Some considered the updated Saturn variant to be the highlight, but found the difficulty level to be high for novices, while criticism was directed towards the audio balance and short levels. Retrospective commentary in the years following its release have hailed it as one of the best titles for the Saturn and it has become an expensive collector's item.

== Gameplay ==
Storm Forgel battling against the third stage boss in Hyper Duel, I.W.A.O. (arcade version shown)

Hyper Duel is a horizontal-scrolling shooter game reminiscent of the Thunder Force series. The premise revolves around machines from an alien civilization discovered by the Unified Space Forces beneath a lunar base. Humanity proceeded to adapt the machines to develop new combat weapons: transformable fighters called Buster Gears. However, before the final testing of the prototypes, terrorists and one of the project's scientists stole a unit named "Black Angel". Three pilots have been tasked with fighting their way through the terrorist forces and either recover or destroy Black Angel.

The player can choose one of three Buster Gears, each with its own advantages and disadvantages: the balanced Storm Forgel (piloted by Keith Spader), the speed-focused High Mustang (piloted by Lisa Rowland), and the power-focused Phalanx Smasher (piloted by Dr. Blodin Lloyd). Each craft can switch between two modes: a compact spaceship fighter and a humanoid mecha armor. The fighter mode is fast, easily maneuverable, and fires wide shots. The armor mode is slower, larger, and less responsive, but capable of firing up or down at a 45-degree angle with superior firepower and traveling on terrain. Both modes are simultaneously upgraded by collecting power-up icons (P) that drop from defeated enemies, however, the game's rank system increases based on the number of power-ups collected.

The game does not feature bombs, instead the player activates a special "Bomber Fire" attack, which involves two satellites that appear around the Buster Gear. In fighter mode, the satellites are fixed and fire in a circular pattern. In armor mode, the satellites rotate around the craft and provide frontal covering fire. The special attack is governed by a meter that gradually depletes when used and the satellites stop firing when it empties. The meter is filled up when the satellites are inactive and by collecting bomber (B) icons. The player can also acquire support units by collecting an item that alternates between Tracer (T) and Gunner (G). Tracer units are ships that shoot forward when near an enemy, while Gunner units are drones that target enemies. Both units can be damaged by enemy fire.

Almost every stage has a boss, and sometimes there are minibosses in the middle of the stage. There are eight stages in total. At the end of each stage, bonus points are awarded to the player for completing the stage, the number of support units remaining, destroying all enemies in the stage, and the amount remaining on the special attack meter. The player can also earn extra points by collecting icons while at full power or by keeping the craft stationary.

== Development and release ==
Hyper Duel was the first original arcade game by Technosoft, best known for the Thunder Force series. It was developed by new members who would later work on Thunder Force V. According to Naosuke Arai, head of Technosoft's development department, planning for the game started from the design phase of the TEC442-A arcade system board, which took a substantial amount of time. Since the arcade board shared the same sound chip found in the X68000, Arai was able to modify the sound drivers he had previously created to work on it but reiterated that he had nothing to do with the game beyond that. Artwork for the game was done by Mitsuakira Tatsuta, who worked on Thunder Force IV. The music was composed by Hyakutaro Tsukumo as his first video game project, and who became the main composer for Technosoft's sound team and later scored the soundtrack for Thunder Force V. Tsukumo expressed frustration that he could only assign two PCM drum sounds to the music, as the arcade board had both FM and PCM sound specifications.

Technosoft first showcased Hyper Duel at the 1993 AOU Show along with Magical Amigo (Note: マジカル・アミーゴ (Majikaru Amīgo)), an action arcade game that was never released. The game was released for arcades by Taito in Japan in October 1993, running on the TEC442-A board. In 1996, the Japanese Sega Saturn Magazine wrote that it was released in January 1994. The game was ported to the Sega Saturn and released by Technosoft in Japan on November 29, 1996. The Saturn port was created by ten staff members in a matter of months due to player demand. It includes the original arcade version and a revised "Saturn Mode" featuring redrawn graphics, a re-arranged soundtrack by Tsukumo, as well as gameplay and control adjustments. Working Designs planned to release the game in North America as a bundle along with Blast Wind and the Thunder Force Gold Pack compilations under their "Spaz" label. Following a dispute at E3 1997 with Sega of America, Working Designs cancelled the deal with Technosoft and withdrew support for the Saturn.

In 1997, Technosoft released the game's soundtrack as part of the Technosoft Game Music Collection Vol. 6: Sanctuary album originally as a gift for the "Shooting Rush Campaign" (Note: シューティングラッシュキャンペーン (Shūtingu Rasshu Kyanpēn)), but more copies were produced due to high demand. In 2003, two tracks from Hyper Duel appeared as part of Noise Image Soundtrack Volume 3: Broken Thunder, an album that included music from the cancelled Thunder Force VI for Dreamcast. In 2006, publisher Factory Noise & AG remastered the game's soundtrack as part of the album Absolute Area, featuring several new arrangements as well as a bonus track arranged by Thunder Force III composer Toshiharu Yamanishi. In 2010, the Technosoft Game Music Collection Vol. 6: Sanctuary album was re-released. A remixed track from Hyper Duel also appeared in the 2019 scrolling shooter game Devil Engine. In 2026, a two-CD album titled Technosoft Music Collection -Hyper Duel- will be released as the seventh volume in the Technosoft Soundtrack series under Sega's Sound! Shock Series label, containing the game's original and Sega Saturn tracks, as well as an arrangement by Kei Takanishi.

== Reception ==
Reception

Review scores
Publication	Score
Famitsu	(SSAT) 22/40
M! Games	(SSAT) 66%
Saturn Fan	(SSAT) 6.6/10
Sega Saturn Magazine (JP)	(SSAT) 6.33/10

Hyper Duel on the Sega Saturn received average reviews. The game reached into the top ten best-selling Saturn titles of that week, and in 2000 it was ranked in a public poll in Dreamcast Magazine as number 228 among Saturn titles.

Two Saturn Fan editors found the game simple but satisfying, noting its gameplay and distinctive mechanical designs, but felt the difficulty level was high for beginners. Reviewers from the Japanese Sega Saturn Magazine felt that while it did not have the same pace as Thunder Force, the strategic element of changing between the craft's two modes was well implemented. They expressed preference for the Saturn mode over arcade mode, but noted the lack of extra content and criticized the audio balance. French publication Joypad regarded Hyper Duel as an excellent shoot 'em up for Saturn, citing the inclusion of both the original and updated versions. MAN!AC's Christian Blendl highlighted the Saturn variant, but felt that the short levels and loud explosion sound effects dampen the game's fun factor.

The game is considered by gaming journalists as one of the rarest, most valuable and sought-after Saturn titles; it became a rare collector's item that fares high prices on the secondary collecting market, due to never being released outside Japan and the popularity of the shoot 'em up genre. In the years after its release, reviewers have celebrated Hyper Duel as one of the Saturn's best and most desired games. Hardcore Gaming 101's Paul Brownlee called the Saturn mode the definitive version of the game, citing the revamped graphics, improved soundtrack, and gameplay tweaks. GamesRadar praised the game's distinctive graphics, energetic music, and solid shooting mechanics, as well as the improved graphics and new control scheme in Saturn mode. Retro Gamer's Darran Jones highlighted the game's striking visuals, vibrant soundtrack, detailed sprite design and inventive bosses, but noted its short levels. Time Extension regarded it as "one of the most appealing blasters of the 32-bit era".
