= Blast Wind =

1997 video game

- Developer: Technosoft
- Publisher: Technosoft
- Producer: Naosuke Arai
- Artist: Taisuke Kanasaki
- Composer: Hyakutaro Tsukumo
- Platform: Sega Saturn
- Release: JP: January 17, 1997
- Genre: Vertically scrolling shooter
- Modes: Single-player, multiplayer

Blast Wind (Note: Japanese: ブラストウインド, Hepburn: Burasuto Uindo) is a 1997 vertically scrolling shooter video game developed and published by Technosoft for the Sega Saturn. In the game, the player controls one of two artificial life forms piloting ships to fight the invading Gorn culture. The player can take an alternate path by pressing switches in each stage.

Blast Wind was created by staff members who would later work on Thunder Force V. Produced by Naosuke Arai, it was originally developed as an arcade game, but the plan changed during production and was postponed until it was released as an original title on the Saturn. The soundtrack was composed by Hyakutaro Tsukumo. Working Designs planned to release the game in North America under their "Spaz" label, but cancelled the deal with Technosoft and dropped support for the Saturn following a dispute with Sega. Although it was not officially published outside Japan, an English fan translation was released in 2024.

Blast Wind received average reviews, with critics praising the frenetic pace, soundtrack, and controls, while others were mixed regarding the overall presentation and path-switching mechanic. Some reviewers also criticized the game's graphics, its short length, and low difficulty.

== Gameplay ==
Hayate shooting enemies with a switch to change path to the right in the Atlantis stage

Blast Wind is a vertically scrolling shooter game. The premise takes place on a post-apocalyptic Earth after a nuclear holocaust nearly decimated the entire population. A handful of people managed to escape thanks to a prophet named Noa who gathered them aboard an ark and emerged after the residual radiation dissipated to build a new civilization. However, they were attacked by an invading culture called Gorn, who survived the nuclear winter by migrating within the Earth's crust and evolving before re-emerging on the surface. Humanity unearths an ancient weapons program as a last resort to fight against Gorn.

The player can choose one of two ships: Hayate (Note: 疾風 (Hayate)) and Reppu (Note: 烈風 (Reppū)) (piloted by the artificial life forms Kyo and Forn respectively). Each ship has a forward-firing shot, a homing shot, and bombs capable of damaging enemies on-screen when deployed. The weapons can be upgraded by collecting power-up icons (P) that drop from defeated enemies, which surround the player's ship with lightning bolts that damage enemies and grant temporary invincibility. The player earns points by shooting enemies and collecting items such as a shield orb that blocks enemy shots before disintegrating, extra lives, bombs, and bonuses. The player can take an alternate path by pressing switches on each stage, altering its difficulty with different waves of enemies and boss patterns, as well as changing scoring opportunities.

== Development and release ==
Blast Wind was developed by Technosoft, best known for the Thunder Force series. It was created by personnel who would later work on Thunder Force V. Naosuke Arai oversaw production as head of development under the pseudonym "Yunker Matai". Taisuke Kanasaki, who later worked at Cing as director and character designer for Another Code: Two Memories, Wish Room: Angel's Memory, and Last Window: Mayonaka no Yakusoku, illustrated the introductory sequence during his time at Technosoft. The music was composed by Hyakutaro Tsukumo. The game was originally developed as an arcade game and a prototype was tested at Sasebo, with a planned release for 1993. However, the plan changed during production and was postponed for a time until it was released as an original title on Sega Saturn. Tsukumo found it difficult to arrange and rewrite the songs because FM and PCM sound sources were the basis. A light-hearted revision titled Inazuma Saber, (Note: 稲妻セイバー (Inazuma Seibā)) with selectable ships and comical dialogue between pilots, was reportedly tested and scheduled for release in 1994 but was scrapped.

Technosoft published Blast Wind in Japan on January 17, 1997. Working Designs planned to release the game in North America as a bundle along with the Thunder Force Gold Pack compilations and Hyper Duel under their "Spaz" label. Following a dispute at E3 1997 with Sega of America, Working Designs cancelled the deal with Technosoft and withdrew support for the Saturn. In 1997, Technosoft released the game's soundtrack as part of the Technosoft Game Music Collection Vol. 7: Reincarnation, with arrangements from Thunder Force IV. In 2010, the Technosoft Game Music Collection Vol. 7: Reincarnation album was re-released. Although it was not officially published outside Japan, an English fan translation was released in 2024, providing narration for the opening sequence, a new voice actor for the game's antagonist, corrected text, and audio rebalancing.

== Reception ==
Reception

Review scores
| Publication | Score |
|---|---|
| Consoles + | 82% |
| Famitsu | 23/40 |
| Fun Generation | 6/10 |
| Saturn Fan | 6.4/10 |
| Sega Saturn Magazine (JP) | 6.0/10 |

Blast Wind received average reviews. The game reached into the top ten best-selling Sega Saturn titles of that week and received a score of 8.1351 out of 10 in a 2000 readers' poll conducted by the Japanese Sega Saturn Magazine, ranking among Saturn titles at the number 351 spot. Two Saturn Fan editors recommended it for those who enjoy retro-style shooters and praised the catchy soundtrack, but noted its lack of innovative mechanics, lackluster presentation, and short length. Reviewers from the Japanese Sega Saturn Magazine commended the game's frenetic pace, but found the branching paths to be underdeveloped and criticized its dated mechanics, specifically the lack of uniformity in enemies and monotonous power-ups.

François Garnier of Consoles + praised the game's overall presentation, lack of slowdown, soundscapes, and branching paths, but felt that it was a bit easy and graphically lacking. Fun Generation's Holger Gößmann and Stefan Hellert considered the game very playable and gave positive comments about its precise controls and music, but found it visually average and saw its short duration as a flaw. Hardcore Gaming 101's Nick Gibson wrote that the solid sprite artwork and energetic soundtrack encouraged replayability when playing for points. Gibson found the switching mechanic interesting, but noted the game's short stages, low difficulty, and restrictive weapon system. Retro Gamer's Darran Jones called Blast Wind a very entertaining shooter, citing its exceptional music and the ability to find new paths through a stage via switches, but felt it was rather ordinary compared to other Technosoft shooters such as Hyper Duel and Thunder Force V due to its chunky graphics and simple scoring system.
