= Elemental Master =

1990 video game

- Developer: Technosoft
- Publishers: JP: Technosoft; NA: Renovation Products
- Composer: Toshiharu Yamanishi
- Platform: Genesis
- Release: JP: 14 December 1990; NA: March 1993
- Genre: Scrolling shooter
- Mode: Single-player

Elemental Master (エレメンタルマスター) is a top down scrolling shooter developed by Technosoft for the Sega Genesis and released in 1990 in Japan and in 1993 in North America by Renovation Products.

== Gameplay ==
The game is autoscrolling upwards. The player can choose to either shoot up or down. There are different weapons (types of magic) available, based on (naturally) the elements. Of the seven levels the game has, the player can choose the order of the first four.

== Plot ==
Long ago in the fantasy kingdom of Lorelei, the followers of an evil being called Gyra were sealed underneath the city's castle. However, a seemingly heroic sorcerer known as Aryaag betrayed the king's trust and unleashed the power of Gyra on the kingdom with the intention of letting the evil influence spread. Laden, the strongest sorcerer in the kingdom, was ready to attack Aryaag, but was stopped in shock when Aryaag revealed himself to be Laden's brother Roki. Backed by Gyra's most dedicated followers, Roki banished Laden from the conquered kingdom, but Laden vows to stop Gyra's influence from spreading and to stop Gyra's ambitions.

== Development ==
The soundtrack was composed by Toshiharu Yamanishi, who also worked on Thunder Force III, Thunder Force IV, and Dragon's Fury (one song from Elemental Master was remixed into a new version in Dragon's Fury). The style of the soundtrack is synthrock with classical vibes.

== Reception ==
Reception

Review scores
Publication	Score
AllGame	2/5
Beep! MegaDrive	7.5/10
Computer and Video Games	82%
Famitsu	6/10, 7/10, 8/10, 5/10
Mean Machines Sega	78%
Console XS	81/100
Console Ma'zine	90%
Electronic Games	85%
Hippon Super!	6/10
Mega Drive Advanced Gaming	70%
MegaTech	78%
Sega Power	3/5
Sega Pro	77/100
Super Gaming	9/10, 9/10, 9/10

Elemental Master received a 7.4723/10 score in a 1995 readers' poll conducted by the Japanese Sega Saturn Magazine, ranking among Sega Mega Drive titles at number 210. The game received generally favorable reviews from critics.

MegaTech praised the game's audiovisual presentation and gameplay, but criticized its easy difficulty. Console XS called its gameplay "addictive", but criticized the game for having too few levels and its easy difficulty. MAN!AC highlighted the game's synth soundtrack and exceptional level design.
