= Thunder Force VI =

2008 shoot 'em up game

- Developer: Sega
- Publisher: Sega
- Director: Kagasei Shimomura
- Producer: Naofumi Shioya
- Designer: Tetsu Okano
- Composers: Tamayo Kawamoto; Motoaki Furukawa; Go Sato; Tsuyoshi Kaneko
- Series: Thunder Force
- Platform: PlayStation 2
- Release: JP: October 30, 2008
- Genre: Horizontal-scrolling shooter
- Mode: Single-player

Thunder Force VI (Note: Japanese: サンダーフォース VI, Hepburn: Sandaa Fōsu VI) is a 2008 horizontal-scrolling shooter video game developed and published for the PlayStation 2 by Sega. The game places the player in the role of a starship that must eradicate the Orn Faust empire before they destroy all of Earth. The player must complete each stage by shooting down enemies and avoiding collisions with them and their projectiles, using an arsenal of powerful weapons to destroy them. It is the sixth and final entry in the long-running Thunder Force video game franchise, and the only one to not be developed by series creator Technosoft.

Thunder Force VI was originally being designed for the Dreamcast by Technosoft in 2000; very little work was completed, and production was halted after Technosoft folded into Japanese pachinko manufacturer Twenty-One Company. Sega acquired the rights to revive the project in early 2007. Development was led by Tez Okano, known for his work on titles such as Segagaga, Astro Boy: Omega Factor and Gunstar Super Heroes. He looked to games such as R-Type Final for inspiration, deciding to create a game that went "back to the roots" of the series instead of making drastic changes to the core gameplay. Okano worked to assemble a team of designers that were fans of the Thunder Force series and had prior experience with working on shooters, gathering several from Taito and Konami to assist in production. The game was intended to be the first under the "Project STG" brand name, intended for remakes and reboots of older shoot'em up franchises. Versions for the Xbox 360, PlayStation Portable and arcades were briefly considered but later scrapped.

Thunder Force VI was met with a mixed reaction from critics, with complaints being directed towards its blurry visuals, short length, soundtrack and for mostly consisting of "recycled" stages and mechanics found in earlier games in the franchise. Fans of the series were especially negative towards the game for lacking originality and innovation, alongside it being mostly a rehash of its predecessors. Its gameplay, graphical style and weapon variety were often the subject of praise.

== Gameplay ==
The player fighting the boss of the second stage

Thunder Force VI is a horizontal-scrolling shooter video game. The player controls a starship that must make it to the end of each stage by destroying incoming enemies and avoiding collisions with them and their projectiles. Stages feature 3D visuals while taking place on a 2D plane, occasionally zooming the camera towards and away the player. Two starships are available at the beginning of the game — the RVR-001 "Phoenix" and the Rynex-R — both of which have different weapon loadouts and playstyles. Additional ships can be unlocked by progressing through the game and completing specific objectives. The player has access to five different weapon types, each having varying abilities and strengths; unlike earlier games in the series, the player starts with all of them, without needing to collect them while progressing through stages. The primary weapon is the "Craw", which can be launched at enemies to create powerful electric charges that obliterate anything in their path. Other weapons include a twin shot, a backwards shot, and a free-range homing shot.

== Plot ==
Thunder Force VI is set in the year A.D. 2161, ten years after the events of its predecessor Thunder Force V. After the artificial intelligence known as the "Guardian" is destroyed, Earth returns to an age of prosperity and peace. Shortly after this, an extraterrestrial race known as the "Orn Faust" make contact with Earth and begin to invade the planet, leaving the Unified Earth Fleet powerless and nearly destroyed. The Unified Earth Government discovers several strange readings from its analysis report of an underground chamber on the island of Babel, where the Guardian was once installed. The readings lead to the location of technology related to the "Vasteel", the starship that had destroyed the Guardian long ago that has since been abandoned and sealed away to protect it. When researchers analyze the technology, they discover that the Vasteel was originally named the "Rynex", a powerful weapon that had been used by the Galaxy Federation extraterrestrial power to combat the Orn Empire, the leader of the Orn Faust. Scientists design a new starship called the RVR-001 "Phoenix", based on the Vasteel's technology, to destroy the Orn Faust and to save all of mankind from destruction.

== Development ==
Thunder Force VI was originally being developed for the Dreamcast by series creator Technosoft, reportedly being in production in early 2000. Aside from an early test video showing an early introduction sequence and several pieces of music, very little progress was made; it was indefinitely shelved during early stages of production after Technosoft folded into Japanese pachinko manufacturer Twenty-One Company. The composer for the project released the music as part of a soundtrack album, titled NOISE Game Music Vol. 3 – Broken Thunder, encompassing both tracks from Thunder Force VI and other games in the series, such as Thunder Force V.

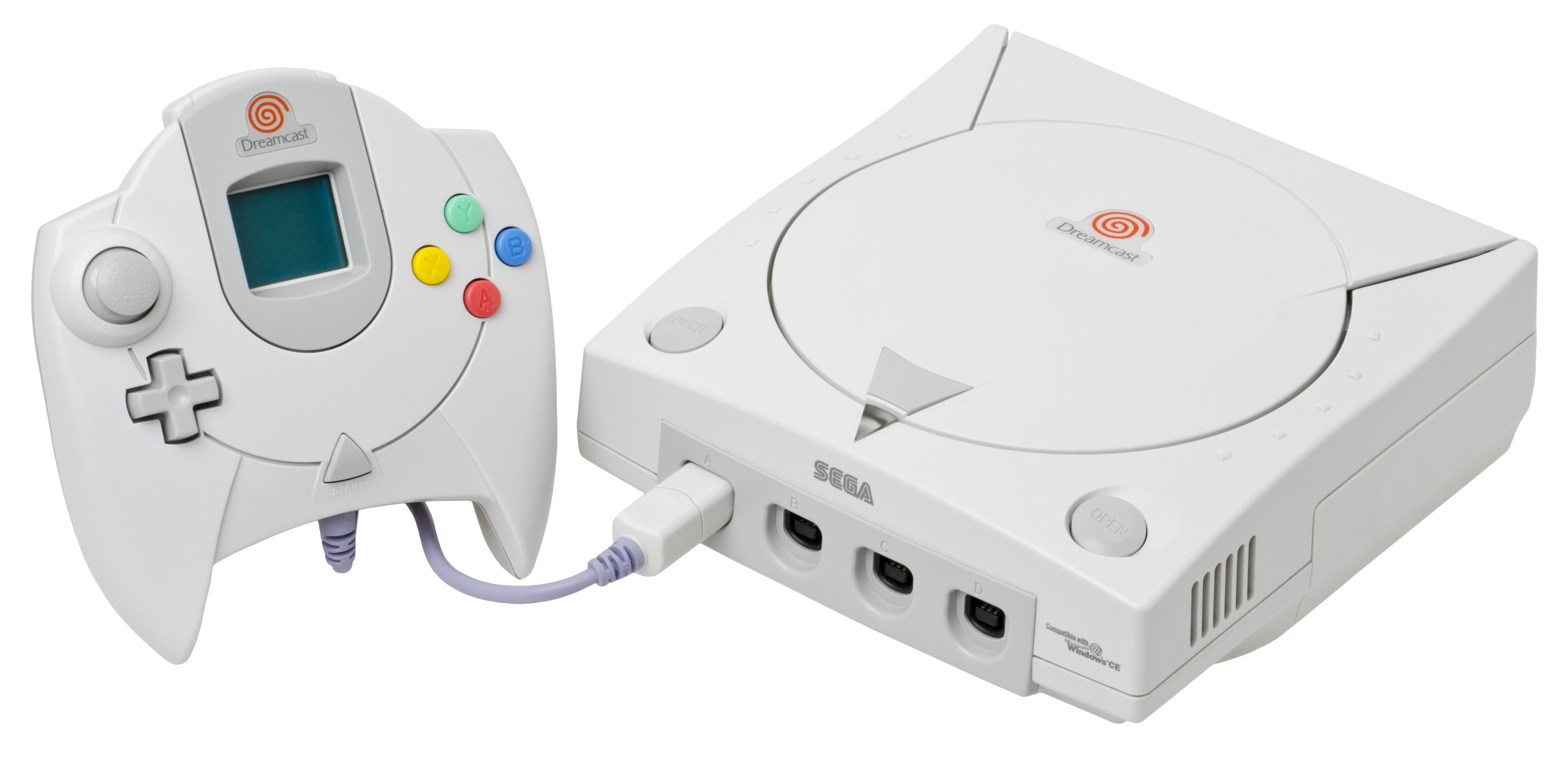
Thunder Force VI was originally being developed for the Dreamcast. When Technosoft was folded into Twenty-One Company before it could be finished, Sega acquired the rights to revive it and release it as a full game.

In early 2007, Sega acquired the license from Technosoft and Twenty-One to revive the project and give it a full release. Development was headed by Sega veteran Tez Okano, known for his work on titles such as Segagaga, Astro Boy: Omega Factor, and Gunstar Super Heroes. Okano was a big fan of the Thunder Force series and was interested in producing a full-length sequel for a modern platform; he had previously designed a Thunder Force-esc stage for his earlier work Segagaga, which also incorporated music from the Broken Thunder album and the Dreamcast version of Thunder Force VI, which he was able to use after securing a deal with Technosoft. Okano worked to assemble a development team that were also fans of the series and had prior experience with designing shooters, gathering several designers from Taito and Konami to assist in production. He looked to Irem's R-Type Final for potential inspiration, choosing to "go back to the roots" of the series instead of trying to incorporate nothing but new ideas and change the core gameplay. Okano and the development team had to pay close attention to the game's budget to prevent it from becoming too large. He considered producing an arcade version, but scrapped the idea after not being able to find an arcade board that had sufficient hardware power for the game. Composing the soundtrack were Tamayo Kawamoto of RayForce, Go Sato of Raiden, and Motoaki Furukawa of Gradius.

Okano claimed that Thunder Force VI would be the first game under the "Project STG", a brand name which he intended to be used for a potential series of shoot'em up revivals and reboots. He stated in an interview that more games would likely be released under the Project STG name if Thunder Force VI proved to be a success. Okano had thought about porting the game to either the Xbox 360 or PlayStation Portable, but these ideas quickly fell through. Sega officially announced the game in July 2008 through Famitsu magazine, releasing several screenshots and promotional videos through their official website. Twenty-One quietly updated their official website announcing their intentions to revive the series with Sega, alongside the game's release. Thunder Force VI was published for the PlayStation 2 in Japan on October 30, 2008.

== Reception ==
Reception

Review scores
Publication	Score
Famitsu	26/40
MeriStation	7/10

Reviews for Thunder Force VI were often mixed, with common complaints being towards its unbalanced difficulty level, soundtrack and usage of assets and entire stage designs from earlier entries in the series. Fans of the series were particularly negative towards it for failing to live up to prior Thunder Force games and for greatly lacking in both innovation and originality.

Japanese publication Famitsu criticized the game for relying mostly on stages and concepts from earlier games in the Thunder Force series, saying that it lacked innovation and originality. They praised the 3D graphics for being used in an interesting way throughout the game, but disliked the textures themselves for being low-textured and unappealing to look at. MeriStation praised the variety of weapons within the game, particularly the CRAW for being greatly improved over the one featured in its predecessor Thunder Force V, but were disappointed towards the level design for being too similar to those in prior entries, as well as its graphical style for being inferior to games like Gradius V. MeriStation applauded its soundtrack for its "techno new age" vibe and for the gameplay still being enjoyable and fun to play, although were critical of its short length. They expressed hope in the game being released outside Japan for services such as Xbox Live Arcade, writing: "In a world dominated by 3D and high definition, the appearance of jewelry like this is worthy of admiration". Edge Spain disliked its overly-easy difficulty level and for reusing assets and ideas from older Thunder Force titles.

In a 2016 retrospective review, Hardcore Gaming 101 stated it felt like a "step back" compared to games such as R-Type Final and Gradius V for its blurry textures, bland soundtrack, and for greatly lacking in originality, specifically criticizing the game for simply lifting entire stage ideas from earlier entries in the series. In light of their criticism, they commended the game's 3D graphics and overall gameplay for still staying true to the series' core, concluding their review with: "Though it's a bit disappointing that Thunder Force VI feels so recycled, at its core, it's still a well-made shooter that pulls off the difficult task of appealing to both casual and hardcore shooter fans". In a retrospective coverage of the series, Nintendo Life was critical of its short length and lack of unique ideas, disliking that it simply reused ideas from other games in the Thunder Force franchise instead of utilizing original mechanics and concepts.
