= Technosoft =

Japanese video game company

- Type: Kabushiki gaisha
- Industry: Video games
- Founded: February 1980; 46 years ago
- Defunct: 2001; 25 years ago
- Fate: Assets incorporated into Twenty-one Company, Intellectual Properties acquired by Sega
- Successor: Twenty-One Technosoft div.
- Headquarters: Sasebo, Nagasaki, Japan
- Products: Video games Computer software

Technosoft (Note: Japanese: 株式会社テクノソフト, Hepburn: Kabushiki-gashia Tekunosofuto) was a Japanese video game developer and publisher based headquartered in Sasebo, Nagasaki. Also known as "Tecno Soft", the company was founded in February 1980 as Sasebo Microcomputer Center, before changing its name to Technosoft in 1982. The company primarily dealt with software for Japanese personal computers, including graphic toolsets and image processing software. Technosoft's first venture into the video game market was Snake & Snake, released in 1982, before seeing success with titles such as Thunder Force (1983) and Plasma Line (1984).

Technosoft became largely profitable during the late-1980s and early-1990s, largely in part due to the widespread popularity of their Thunder Force and Herzog franchises. However, later in the decade, Technosoft began to largely diminish as profits began to slump, before ultimately being acquired and folded into Japanese pachinko manufacturer Twenty-One Company in late 2001. Twenty-One began to release products in 2008 under the Technosoft brand, and sold the entirety of its video game library to Sega in 2016. The Technosoft name continues to be in use in the present day as the name for Twenty-One's research and development division, and as a brand name for various products such as soundtrack albums.

== History ==
Some staff members left Technosoft to start the game development companies Arsys Software in 1985 (founded by Kotori Yoshimura, creator of Thunder Force and Plazma Line), CAProduction in 1993, and Ganbarion in 1999.

In 2006, the URL for Technosoft was registered and updated. However, no updates other than "We will restart soon! Please wait for a while." and "THUNDERFORCE is a registered trademark." have been added to the website. In 2008, The Technosoft brand was revived by Twenty-One company. Technosoft licensed merchandising and music of the brand's past titles. The copyright for Technosoft's intellectual properties were not registered under Technosoft nor Twenty-One Company, but to Kazue Matsuoka.

Sega revealed that Thunder Force III will be part of Sega 3D Classics Collection, and on September 17, 2016, at the Tokyo Game Show, Sega announced that they acquired the intellectual property and development rights to all the games developed and published by Technosoft. When questioned about future Technosoft releases, Sega would look into re-releasing Thunder Force IV, Thunder Force V and Herzog Zwei.

In September 2016, there was a total of 21 registrations made by Sega Holdings. These registrations revised the copyright of Technosoft intellectual properties from Kazue Matsuoka to Sega Games Co, Ltd thus completing the acquisition. As of 2016, the digital soundtrack rights for the Thunder Force series will still be handled by Twenty-One Company through the Twenty-One Technosoft division.

Factors that influenced the acquisition included the former Technosoft president stating that they did not want the Technosoft brand to desist, and so handing over the intellectual properties to Sega was the only other option. Sega and Technosoft also had an established collaboration during the Genesis/Mega Drive era and so this pre-established relationship was also a factor when acquiring the brand rights to Technosoft titles.

== Notable releases ==
=== Thunder Force ===
The company's most commercially successful franchise was the Thunder Force series. It was a series of scrolling shooter video games. The series began with the original Thunder Force in 1983. The games are known by fans of the genre for their hardcore appeal, pleasing graphics, and generally well composed synthesizer-based chiptune music soundtracks.

The series' first game, Thunder Force, appeared in 1983 on a variety of Japanese computers, such as the Sharp X1, NEC PC-8801 mkII, and FM-7. Technosoft also released a level editor, or game creation system, entitled Thunder Force Construction, for the original game on the FM-7 computer in 1984. Since Thunder Force II, the majority of installments in the series appeared on the Mega Drive console, where the series gained much of its popularity. The most recent entry was released on PlayStation 2.

=== Plazma Line ===
Plazma Line プラズマライン
- Developer: Technosoft
- Publisher: Technosoft
- Designer: Kotori Yoshimura
- Platforms: NEC PC-8801, NEC PC-6001, FM-7, Sharp X1
- Release: PC-8801 / PC-6001 / X1; 1984; FM-7; December 1984
- Genres: First -person racing game Space flight simulator

The Sharp X1 port of Plazma Line (1984), an early first-person futuristic racing video game. This GIF animation of the game demonstrates early use of 3D polygon graphics and automap feature.

Plazma Line (プラズマライン) is a first-person space racing game released by Technosoft for the NEC PC-8801 and FM-7 computers in 1984. It is notable for being the first computer game, and home video game in general, with 3D polygon graphics. The objective of the game is to race through outer space in a first-person view while avoiding obstacles (rendered in 3D polygons) along the way. It also featured an automap radar to keep track of the player's position.

The game was created by Kotori Yoshimura, who also created the original Thunder Force. Yoshimura later left the company in 1985 to start the development studio Arsys Software along with fellow Technosoft member Osamu Nagano.

In March 1985, Plazma Line was ranked number five on the Beep list of best-selling Japanese computer games.

=== Herzog ===
Herzog (German: "Duke") is a strategy video game released by Technosoft in Japan for the MSX and NEC PC-88 computers in 1988. It was a real-time tactics and tactical shooter game with real-time strategy elements.

The series' best known entry is the Sega Mega Drive (Genesis) title Herzog Zwei (1989), which is sometimes regarded as the world's first real time strategy game. Although released two years after Nether Earth, it was the first game with a feature set that falls under the contemporary definition of the real-time strategy genre, predating the genre-popularizing Dune II. The producers of Dune II acknowledged Herzog Zwei (meaning "Duke 2" in German) as an influence on the game.

== Releases ==
Year	Title	Platform(s)
1980	2001: A Space Odyssey	FM-7, Sharp MZ, Hitachi Basic Master Level 3, PC-8000, PC-6001, Matsushita JR series, Panasonic JR, Toshiba Pasopia
1981	2001: A Space Odyssey Part 2	FM-7, Sharp MZ, Hitachi Basic Master Level 3, PC-8000, PC-6001, Matsushita JR series, Panasonic JR, Toshiba Pasopia
1982	Snake & Snake	PC-8000, Sharp MZ
1983	Thunder Force	FM-7, PC-6601, PC-88, PC-98, Sharp MZ, X1
1984	Plazma Line	FM-7, PC-6601, PC-88, PC-98, Sharp MZ, X1
1987	COMSIGHT	PC88, X1, X68000
1988	Feedback	MSX2
1988	Herzog	MSX2, PC-8801, PC-9801, X1
1988	Thunder Force II	X68000, Sega Genesis
1989	Herzog Zwei	Sega Genesis
1990	Thunder Force III	Sega Genesis, Arcade
1990	Elemental Master	Sega Genesis
1991	Devil's Crush	Sega Genesis
1991	Thunder Spirits	Super Nintendo Entertainment System
1992	Thunder Force IV	Sega Genesis
1993	Hyper Duel	Arcade, Sega Saturn
1994	Magical Error o Sagase!	Arcade
1994	Starblade	Sega CD
1994	Nekketsu Oyako	PlayStation, Sega Saturn
1995	Kyuutenkai: Fantasic Pinball	PlayStation, Sega Saturn
1996	Thunder Force Gold Pack 1	Sega Saturn
1996	Thunder Force Gold Pack 2	Sega Saturn
1997	Blast Wind	Sega Saturn
1997	Neorude	PlayStation
1998	Kaze no Oka Kōen nite	PlayStation
1998	Kumitate Battle: Kuttu Ketto	PlayStation, Sega Saturn
1998	Thunder Force V	PlayStation, Sega Saturn
1998	Silent Möbius: Genei no Datenshi	PlayStation
1999	My Garden	PlayStation
1999	Getter Robo Daikessen	PlayStation
