= Panasonic JR-200 =

Computer produced by Panasonic in 1982

- Type: Home computer
- Released: United States: January 1983 (43 years ago)
- Discontinued: 1984
- Media: Cassette tape
- Operating system: JR-BASIC
- CPU: MN1800A @ 0.89 MHz (MC6802 compatible) + MN1544CJR
- Memory: 36kb (32k + 2k for graphic characters + 2k VRAM)
- Display: 32 x 24 character text display, 8 colors; 64×48 semigraphics, equivalent to 256x192 if using custom characters
- Sound: MN1544CJR (three square wave voices)
- Predecessor: Panasonic JR-100
- Successor: Panasonic JR-300

The National JR-200- also known as the Panasonic Personal Computer JR-200U in some markets- was a simple, relatively early, 8-bit home computer released in 1983 by Matsushita (now known as Panasonic). It featured a chiclet keyboard somewhat similar to the VTech Laser 200 or ZX Spectrum and is part of the JR Series of microcomputers.

Made of silver grey plastic, it had a black matte area around the keyboard area. Most of the 63 rubber chiclet keys were grey, with some (the more important) keys in marine blue, and with white control and break keys. Each of the grey keys could produce any of five inputs: Upper and lower-case letters (or numbers and symbols), two graphic characters (similar to the graphic symbols of PETSCII), and a BASIC keyword. Two keys, ALPHA and GRAPH, are used to switch back and forth between character and graphics modes. Holding down the CONTROL key while pressing any grey key produced a BASIC keyword. In total the JR-200 had 253 built-in characters: 96 letters, numbers and symbols, 5 Greek letters, 63 graphical symbols, 79 Japanese (katakana) symbols and 10 music and other symbols. All symbols formed in an 8x8 pixel matrix, and the JR-200 could display 32 characters per line and 24 lines. All relevant keys would auto-repeat when pressed continuously.

The JR-200 used a very unusual 8-bit CPU, the MN1800A, which was compatible with the Motorola MC6802, a slightly improved version of the Motorola 6800. It ran at a slow 0.89 MHz (according to unconfirmed information). There is also a second processor, the 4-bit MN1544CJR, which is used for I/O and contains 128 bytes of RAM plus four kilobytes of ROM.

A version of the JR-200 called the Panasonic JR-200U was developed for the North American and European markets and was announced in January 1983.

== JR-Basic ==
The JR-200 did not use Microsoft BASIC, but its own dialect, one that was designed to be mostly compatible with Microsoft BASIC. JR-BASIC was a greatly extended BASIC, with, (for example) graphical commands such as COLOR, (which selected character color, background color and display mode) and PLOT which permitted direct addressing of the low resolution graphics mode (64×48, using text semigraphics characters, which represented pixel blocks that used one-quarter of each character). Eight colors were available for the background and foreground use: blue, red, magenta, green, cyan, yellow, white and black. By re-programming a part of the character-set a limited high resolution graphics mode was achievable with a resolution of 256×192. The BASIC also supported on-screen editing and direct execution of BASIC instructions. the machine came with 32K of RAM, and had 30,716 bytes free for a Basic program. User memory could be expanded to 40K. JR-BASIC itself occupied 16K of ROM, while the character set video memory and I/O used another 6K. The JR-200 ROM also contained a machine code monitor to enter and execute machine code programs.

== Sound ==
The JR-200 was capable of producing a wide range of sounds. The JR-200 had a general purpose timer, the MN1544CJR I/O chip, with three of the timer outputs being hooked up to generate square wave tones. The BASIC supported the sound capabilities with commands ranging from a simple BEEP command (BEEP 1 producing an 880 Hz "middle octave A" sound), to the SOUND (f, d) command which took two numerical parameters for frequency and duration, and the PLAY and TEMPO commands which could take multiple commands to play a tone over a 5-octave range, and played them in the background while the BASIC program continued. Clever use of the three square wave voices could be used to generate a range of other sounds, such as explosions. A keystroke could be accompanied by an audible feedback signal. Audio was output from an RCA (Tulip) connector onto which an eight ohm speaker could be directly connected, but the JR-200 also had a small built-in speaker. On the back of the device there was a volume control potentiometer that controlled both the internal and external speaker.

== I/O connectors ==
On the back of the device you could also find an eight-pin DIN connector for a cassette recorder with which you could load programs at 2400 bit/s. Then two connectors for video output, an RCA connector RF output and an eight-pins DIN connector that could output NTSC or RGB video. The JR-200UP variant outputs composite PAL and RGB. Two other connectors provided a centronics compatible printer port, (supported by BASIC with LPRINT, LLIST and HCOPY, a "screen dump" command) and an expansion interface port. The expansion port connector also had signal lines for an RS232 serial connection which BASIC supported with several commands, but its main use was to connect a 5¼-inch floppy disk drive.

On its left side the JR-200 had two DB-9 joystick connectors which could be connected to standard (Atari style) joysticks, which could be read by the BASIC STICK command.

In contrast to most other home computers of the time the JR-200 did not use an external transformer unit but had a built-in, completely contained, power supply.

== Reception ==
The computer received favorable reviews on its launch. Creative Computing wrote "The Panasonic JR-200 is one of the nicest new computers to make the scene in some time."
