= Segagaga =

2001 role-playing video game

- Developer: Hitmaker
- Publisher: Sega
- Director: Tez Okano
- Platform: Dreamcast
- Release: JP: March 29, 2001
- Genre: Role-playing
- Mode: Single-player

Segagaga (Note: Japanese: セガガガ, Hepburn: Segagaga) is a 2001 role-playing simulation video game developed by Hitmaker and published by Sega for the Dreamcast in Japan. Described as a "Sega simulation", the player takes control of Sega Tarō, who must help save a struggling Sega from losing to its rival DOGMA, who owns 97% of the console market. Gameplay involves battling employees and other characters throughout various Sega development studios, some being taken from older Sega game franchises. It features many tongue-in-cheek references to Sega and the video game industry, particularly Sony Computer Entertainment and its PlayStation 2 console.

Development was directed by Tez Okano, who worked on Segagaga in secret for two years. When he presented it to Sega, the management took it as a joke at first and dismissed it, but a second presentation impressed them. Okano marketed Segagaga himself with a budget of $200, half of which he spent on a promotional wrestling mask. Several characters, such as Segata Sanshiro and a Ferrari from Out Run, had to be cut due to licensing issues. Toei Animation produced the animated cutscenes. Segagaga was initially exclusive to the Sega Direct online service, but its popularity eventually resulted in a physical release.

Segagaga received positive reviews for its humor, gameplay, bizarre nature, use of various Sega franchises and for poking fun at the industry. One critic labeled it the "swan song" of the Dreamcast. It is one of the last games for the Dreamcast, released two days before its discontinuation on March 31, 2001.

== Gameplay ==
In-game screenshot, showing the player fighting Amigo from Samba de Amigo.

Segagaga is a role-playing simulation video game, described as a "Sega simulation". Controlling the young Sega Tarō, the player is tasked with saving a struggling Sega from losing the console market to their rival DOGMA. The player must progress through various Sega development studios and fight various employees, who due to the stress and pressure brought on by tight work constraints have turned into mutants. Unlike other role-playing games, Tarō "attacks" by shouting verbal abuses and insults, such as telling them their game is terrible or they will never get a girlfriend. Enemies have a "will meter" that weakens as the player deals more insults towards them, and will win the fight once it fully drains. Failing to defeat an enemy will result in a month of development time being lost, which becomes critical as the game progresses.

Once an enemy is defeated, they may become willing to ally with the player and aid them in their adventure. Should the defeated enemy accept, the player will need to quickly answer questions within a ten-second timer, such as how much the employee will make and what work conditions there are. If the player succeeds, they can place the new employee into one of four development group positions, including director, designer, planner, and programmer — development teams will increase the player's stamina and "creativity", detrimental to later sections. Based on player decisions, teams can either make a small number of high-quality games or quickly produce shovelware games to hopefully generate profit. The game ends after three years of development time are completed; the ending is based on the player's performance.

Segagaga features references to Sega franchises, alongside parodies of the game industry. Tarō meets Sega characters including Sonic the Hedgehog, Ristar, Alex Kidd, Sir Pepper III from Clockwork Knight, Nei from Phantasy Star 2, Opa-Opa from Fantasy Zone, the Bad Brothers from Golden Axe, Panda from Baku Baku Animal, Amigo from Samba de Amigo, and the F-14 Tomcat from After Burner. Towards the end, Tarō pilots a starship known as the "R-720", a nod to the R-360 arcade cabinet, into outer space that features a shoot'em up level reminiscent of Thunder Force. Tarō will fight various mechs designed after older Sega game consoles, such as the Sega Genesis and Master System. The story takes place in the year 2025, depicting Sega with having only a 3% share of the console market, the other 97% being owned by their rival DOGMA — a spoof of Sega's rival Sony Interactive Entertainment, featuring parodies of the PlayStation 2 and other Sony characters. To help save the company from total collapse, Sega establishes "Project Segagaga", led by company newcomers Sega Tarō and Yayoi Haneda in order to assist Sega in claiming 100% of the market and achieving world domination.

== Development ==
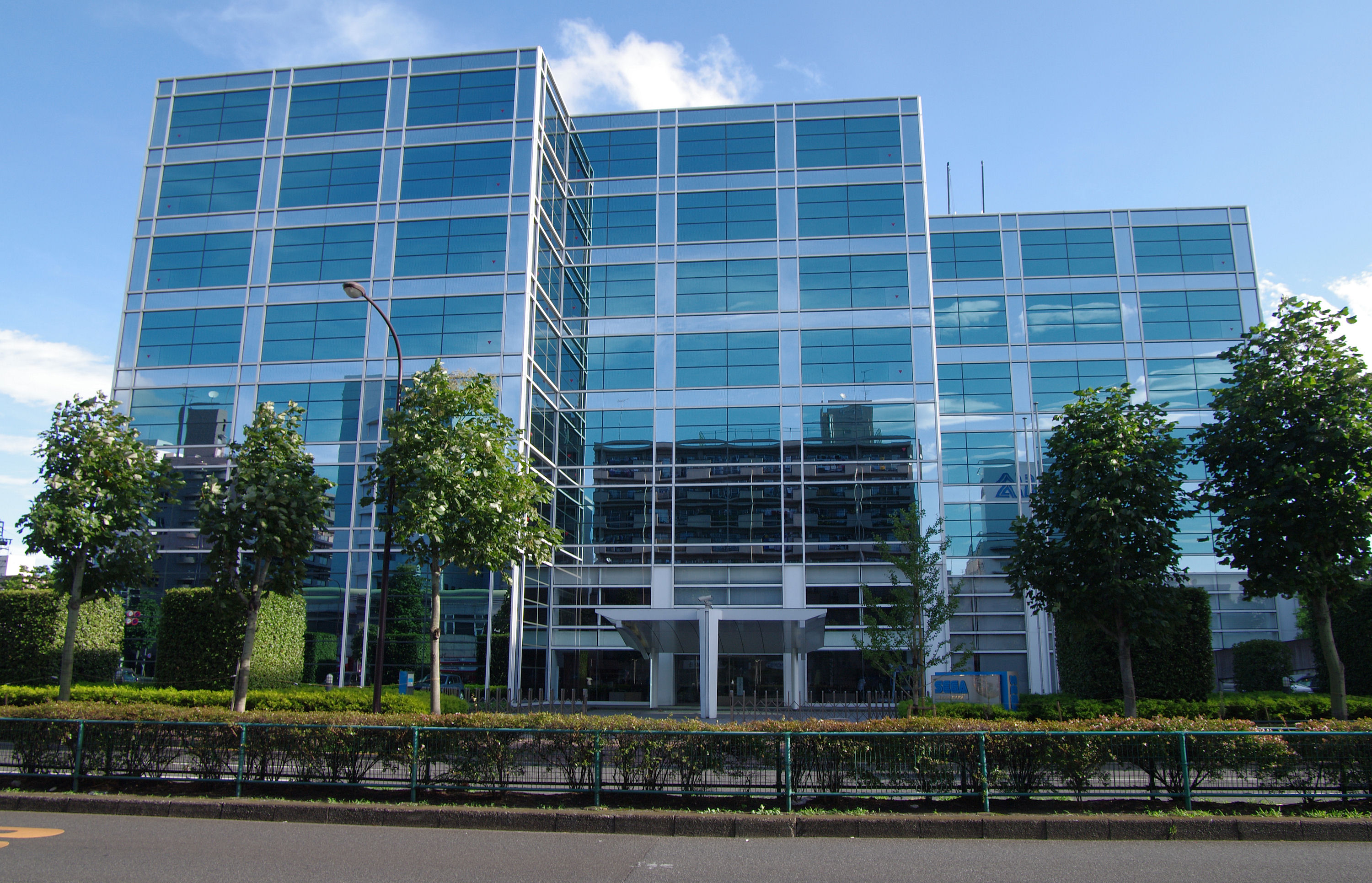
Segagaga was developed in secret within the company for two years (former corporate office in Ōta, Tokyo pictured above)

Segagaga was directed and designed by Tez Okano. He worked on in secret for two years before presenting it to Sega, fearing that "anything could have happened" if the project was revealed. Sega's management initially misconstrued the game as a joke and dismissed it. When Okano presented it again, the Hitmaker president, Hisao Oguchi, was impressed and allowed development to continue. It was produced on a small budget. Toei Animation produced the opening and cutscenes; because of the budget, Okano was given a small discount.

Development was handled by Hitmaker, a production studio known for games such as Virtua Tennis and Crazy Taxi. Segagaga was originally titled Sega Sega and was changed to make the word "Sega" less intrusive. Early versions had nearly 300 production problems, some of which caused characters to be removed entirely, such as the Japanese Sega Saturn mascot Segata Sanshiro and the Ferrari from Out Run. Okano used a large number of Sega franchises due to their popularity and for them being freely available to use. Once the finished product was presented, Sega felt that it didn't cast a negative impression on the company and authorized its release. Toshiharu Yamanishi, who previously worked on the early Atelier series, was a composer.

== Release ==
Okano was given a $200 marketing budget; roughly half of it was spent on a promotional wrestling mask. He set up signing events at locations across Akihabara, rewarding those who visited all four of them. Assisting him was Sega public relations head Tadashi Takezaki and Sega AM3 employee Taku Sasahara to help promote it, garnering a full-page newspaper story.

Segagaga was released in Japan on March 29, 2001, as an exclusive for the Sega Direct online service. A promotional Dreamcast VMU memory card, designed after the exterior of the Mega Drive, was released the same day. On May 1, the Japan Adult Children's Association ordered Sega to remove it due to one of the characters being called "Adult Children", a Japanese term that can refer to a child with an alcoholic parent; Sega issued a public apology and reissued an altered version that replaced the name of the character. The popularity led to the release of a physical version, and later a budget version. A special collector's box was made including a Segagaga shirt, notebook, and enamel pins with the Segagaga, Sega Mark III, Mega Drive, Game Gear, Saturn, and Dreamcast logos.

The Thunder Force-inspired shoot'em up level in Segagaga was later released for Japanese mobile phones as a standalone game on June 2, 2005, for the Sega Ages mobile service, titled Segagaga R-720. It featured additional enemies and bosses not found in the Dreamcast game, such as having a giant Sega Saturn as a boss. The soundtrack for Segagaga has been released several times; the first of these was split into two different volumes, titled Segagaga Soundtrack Blue Edition and Segagaga Soundtrack Red Edition, were both jointly released in Japan in December 2001. The second, Segagaga 5 Original Soundtrack, was released on July 20, 2006, in Japan to commemorate the five-year anniversary of the release. It album was later split into two volumes and released for iTunes and Amazon Music in 2015.

In 2026, an English fan translation was released by Exxistance. However, it attracted controversy over its use of artificial intelligence, creating a translation criticized as being low quality.

== Reception ==
Reception

Review scores
Publication	Score
Famitsu	31/40
Dreamzone	43/100
Joypad	?/100
Dreamcast Magazine	6.66/10

Likely due to its late release in the Dreamcast's lifespan, Segagaga was not a commercial success. In its first week of release, it sold an estimated 18,000 copies. In total, it has sold little over 34,000 copies.

Official Dreamcast Magazine US applauded the humor and bizarre premise, saying that its design and amount of content "will surprise many". They also expressed disappointment towards the lack of an overseas release. Japanese publication Famitsu praised its usage of older Sega game characters and unique setting, alongside its role-playing elements and humor towards the game industry, notably with DOGMA being a spoof of Sony, Sega's then-biggest rival. In a more negative light, Dreamcast Magazine Japan commended the "ambitious" premise, but felt the humor would only be appreciated by hardcore Sega fans. They unfavorably compared its gameplay to Sakura Wars 3: Is Paris Burning?, recommending that RPG enthusiasts instead buy that game

In a 2009 retrospective review, Kurt Kalata of Hardcore Gaming 101 commended Segagaga for its gameplay and humor, namely for poking fun at the Japanese video game industry at the time and for presenting a somber look towards the company as they were approaching a near-collapse. He also liked the Sega fanservice and its bizarre battle system, as well as for being a generally import-friendly game despite its large usage of Japanese. Kalata concluded his review writing: "Anyone willing to brave the Japanese language will find one of the most original, self-referential titles ever made, a stroke of genius that's a virtual dream come true for Sega fans."

Retro Gamer stated in 2020 that Segagaga "remains a work of crazy reflexive genius, and demands to be played by anyone with even a passing interest in games industry history", highly-praising its strange battle system and tongue'n cheek references to the then-collapsing company. Eurogamer's Martin Robinson listed it as one of Sega's stranger video game products for its self-awareness and humor, writing: "The final days of Sega's final console had a fatalistic air to them, and Segaga punctured all that with brilliant self-awareness." Writing for GamesRadar+, Chris Antista described Segagaga as an "amazingly bizarre swan song" for the Dreamcast, and expressed hoped that Sega would rerelease it for digital distribution services such as Xbox Live.
