= Battle Zeque Den =

1994 video game

- Developer: Arsys Software
- Publisher: Asmik Ace Entertainment
- Composer: Kenichi Yaguchi
- Platform: Super Famicom
- Release: JP: 15 July 1994
- Genre: Action-beat 'em up
- Mode: Single-player

Battle Zeque Den (Note: Japanese: バトル ゼクウ 伝, Hepburn: Batoru Zekū-Den) is a Japan-exclusive video game for the Super Famicom.

== Gameplay ==
The game features huge super deformed characters with exaggerated animations and special moves. Three female fighters can be chosen in this game.

== Plot ==
They are embarking on a journey to defeat some evil forces trying to take over the world.

== Reception ==
Famitsu gave it a 22 out of 40 score.
