= Thunder Force Gold Pack =

1996 video game compilation

- Gold Pack 1 (left) and Gold Pack 2 (right) covers
- Developer: Technosoft
- Publisher: Technosoft
- Series: Thunder Force
- Platform: Sega Saturn
- Release: JP: September 27, 1996 (Gold Pack 1); JP: December 6, 1996 (Gold Pack 2)
- Genre: Various
- Mode: Single-player

Thunder Force Gold Pack (Note: Japanese: サンダーフォース ゴールドパック, Hepburn: Sandā Fōsu Gōrudo Pakku) is a 1996 video game compilation duology developed and published by Technosoft for the Sega Saturn. Part of the Thunder Force series, the first release (Gold Pack 1) includes Thunder Force II (1989) and Thunder Force III (1990), while the second release (Gold Pack 2) includes Thunder Force AC (1990) and Thunder Force IV (1992). In each game, players assume the role of Galaxy Federation pilots taking control of a space fighter craft to defeat the Orn Empire and a powerful threat called Vios. Both compilations were released to gauge interest for the then-upcoming Thunder Force V. Each compilation were met with mixed reception from critics since their release.

== Games ==
Selection screens of Gold Pack 1 (top) and Gold Pack 2 (bottom)

Thunder Force Gold Pack is a compilation duology of four scrolling shooter games previously released in the Thunder Force franchise by Technosoft: Gold Pack 1 includes the original Sega Mega Drive versions of Thunder Force II and Thunder Force III, while Gold Pack 2 includes Thunder Force AC (an arcade port of Thunder Force III) and Thunder Force IV (known as Lightening Force: Quest for the Darkstar in North America). Each compilation features an arranged soundtrack, an introductory FMV sequence and gallery containing info on the series. In Thunder Force II, players assume the role of Galaxy Federation pilots Raido A. Jupiter and Diana Lean commanding the Exceliza space fighter craft to defeat the Orn Empire's Plealos battleship. Stages in the game are split into two formats: the "top-view" stages and "side-view" stages. The game introduces a weapon system consisting of twin and back shots that are upgraded by collecting certain items, as well as new weapons and the CRAW satellite pods. Players can switch freely between each weapon, with the top-view and side-view formats having their own subset of weapons, but all arsenal will be lost after the Exceliza is destroyed.

In Thunder Force III, players now assume the role of G.F. pilots Jean R. Fern and Sherry M. Jupiter commanding the Styx fighter craft on a mission to destroy five cloaking devices on major planets of the Orn Empire's space cluster, infiltrate their headquarters and destroy the Cerberus battleship, as well as confront the bio-computer emperor "Cha Os". Gameplay is similar to the side-view stages of the second entry albeit with changes. Players only have five weapons and the currently selected weapon is lost after the Styx's destruction. The arcade version, Thunder Force AC, features enhanced visuals and an extra music track but removes the ability to choose between stages and two stages were replaced. Difficulty is also increased compared to the Mega Drive original and the autofire mechanic is removed.

In Thunder Force IV, players take the role of pilots Roy S. Mercury and Carol T. Mars commanding the Rynex ship to face a powerful threat called Vios, formed from survivors of the Orn Empire, by destroying their base in the planet Aceria. Gameplay follows the same format as the third installment but with minimal changes, introducing larger and more open-ended stages. Midway through the game, players obtain a powerful attack called "Thunder Sword" but requires two CRAW satellites attached to Rynex. The Gold Pack 2 version improved on the original Mega Drive release by eliminating slowdown, adding an easier mode which gives the player bonus defensive abilities, as well as adding the Styx fighter from Thunder Force III as a secret playable ship.

== Release and reception ==
Reception

Review scores
Publication	Score
Famitsu	(Gold Pack 1) 21/40 (Gold Pack 2) 23/40
M! Games	(Gold Pack 1) 72% (Gold Pack 2) 73%
Video Games (DE)	(Gold Pack 1) 70%
Fun Generation	(Gold Pack 1) 6/10
Saturn Fan	(Gold Pack 1) 5.6/10 (Gold Pack 2) 6.4/10
Sega Saturn Magazine (JP)	(Gold Pack 1) 5.33/10 (Gold Pack 2) 6.0/10

Thunder Force Gold Pack 1 and Thunder Force Gold Pack 2 were published in 1996 by Technosoft for the Sega Saturn on September 27 and December 6 respectively. Both compilations were released in the mid 1990s to gauge interest in the then-upcoming Thunder Force V. Each compilation were met with mixed reception from critics. However, public reception was positive; Readers of the Japanese Sega Saturn Magazine voted to give both Gold Pack 1 and Gold Pack 2 scores of a 7.7076 and 8.8768 out of 10, ranking at the number 475 and 112 spots respectively, indicating a popular following.

Video Games's Wolfgang Schaedle noted the lack of change with playability in Thunder Force Gold Pack 1 but commended the technical improvements over the Sega Mega Drive originals, enemy patterns and power-up system, stating that Gold Pack 1 "is a nice game collection of two top-class 16-bit titles, which may no longer knock a modern console gamer off his feet, but all in all ensure rock-solid shoot'em-up entertainment." Fun Generation's two reviewers also commended the gameplay of both Thunder Force II and Thunder Force III but criticized the lack of improvements with Gold Pack 1 in regards to audiovisual presentation. MAN!AC's Christian Blendl regarded both Thunder Force III and Thunder Force IV as highlights of Gold Pack 1 and Gold Pack 2 respectively, as well as the extra additions and improvements introduced in the second compilation.
