= Thunder Force III =

1990 video game

- North American Genesis box art
- Developer: Technosoft
- Publisher: Technosoft
- Series: Thunder Force
- Platforms: Sega Genesis, Arcade, SNES, Sega Saturn, Nintendo 3DS, Nintendo Switch
- Release: June 8, 1990: Sega Genesis; JP: June 8, 1990; NA: October 1990 Arcade; JP: December 1990 SNES; JP: December 27, 1991 Sega Saturn; JP: September 27, 1996; JP: December 6, 1996 (AC) Nintendo 3DS; JP: December 22, 2016 Nintendo Switch (AC); JP: May 14, 2020; NA/EU: May 28, 2020
- Genre: Scrolling shooter
- Mode: Single-player

Thunder Force III (サンダーフォースIII) is a 1990 scrolling shooter game developed by Technosoft for the Sega Genesis. It is the third chapter in the Thunder Force series. It was then retooled into an arcade game named Thunder Force AC. In 1991, Thunder Force AC was ported to the Super Nintendo Entertainment System under the title Thunder Spirits.

== Gameplay ==
Gameplay screenshot

For Thunder Force III, the free-directional, overhead stage format featured in the previous two games is removed and replaced entirely by the horizontally scrolling stage format. The horizontal format became the new standard for the series.

The player is allowed to choose which of the initial five planets (Hydra, Gorgon, Seiren, Haides, and Ellis), to start on. After the first five stages are completed, the game continues for three more stages into ORN headquarters.

The weapon system from Thunder Force II returns in this game, with some modifications. Some weapons from Thunder Force II are reused or modified slightly (the enhanceable Twin shot and Back shot remain the defaults), while others are completely new and exclusive to the game.

This time, when the player's ship is destroyed, only the weapon that was currently in use is lost (unless it is a default weapon and assuming the game is operating at the default difficulty settings). On any higher difficulty modes than the default one, all weapons are lost when the ship gets destroyed. CLAWs also make their return and have the same behavior and functions, except now when the player collects the CLAW item, the ship automatically receives its maximum two CLAWs (again, CLAWs are lost upon ship destruction in every difficulty mode). Also, when using most weapons, the CLAWs will mimic the ship and fire the same weapon (similar to the Options in Gradius games). The final new addition is that the player's ship now has a speed setting, which can be increased or decreased across four levels at the press of a button.

== Plot ==
Thunder Force III takes place about 100 years after Thunder Force and directly after Thunder Force II. Despite their successes, the Galaxy Federation has not been faring well in their battle against the ORN Empire. ORN has installed cloaking devices on five major planets in their space territory that conceal their main base, making it difficult for the Galaxy Federation to locate and attack their headquarters. Also, ORN has built a remote defense system to protect itself named Cerberus, which is especially efficient at neutralizing large ships and fleets. Knowing this, the Galaxy Federation creates the FIRE LEO-03 Styx; a craft small enough to avoid detection by Cerberus, yet equipped with the firepower of a large starfighter. The Galaxy Federation deploys Styx (which is controlled by the player) on a mission to destroy the five cloaking devices, infiltrate the Empire's headquarters, and destroy ORN emperor, the bio-computer "Cha Os".

== Ports ==
Screenshot of Thunder Force AC, showcasing planet Haides retooled with new level design

Thunder Force III was released on June 8, 1990, in Japan. Due to the success of the game for the Mega Drive/Genesis, it was decided that the game would be brought to the arcade scene under the name Thunder Force AC. Ported to Sega's System C-2 hardware, Thunder Force AC is almost graphically identical to its Mega Drive counterpart, with only very minor and often unnoticeable differences. Thunder Force AC has been described as a retooling of Thunder Force III because it borrows enemies and stages from the earlier Thunder Force II as well as adding some original content.

Thunder Force AC was also ported to the Super Nintendo Entertainment System in 1991 as Thunder Spirits, by Toshiba EMI. The SNES version does away with level selection, changes several levels, and features a modified soundtrack.

In 1996, Thunder Force III was re-released in Thunder Force Gold Pack 1 for the Sega Saturn. Thunder Force AC was re-released in Thunder Force Gold Pack 2, also for the Sega Saturn.

With Sega buying the rights to the series in 2016, Thunder Force AC was re-released on Nintendo Switch worldwide in May 2020 as part of the Sega Ages line. This version includes an easy mode, online leaderboards, improved sound, and various other improvements.

== Reception ==
Reception

Review scores
Publication	Score
AllGame	4.5/5 (Genesis)
Electronic Gaming Monthly	9/10, 8/10, 9/10, 7/10 (Genesis)
Famitsu	31/40 (Genesis)
MegaTech	89%
Mean Machines	86% (Genesis)

The original Genesis version received much praise. GamePro called it "a straightforward flying shooter with gorgeous graphics", particularly mentioning the large, detailed enemies and "intricate backgrounds". They described it as extremely difficult, most suited for hardcore shooter fans. MegaTech magazine praised the use of parallax, as well as the sound and gameplay. In 1992 Mega placed the game at #17 in their Top Mega Drive Games of All Time. In 1997 Electronic Gaming Monthly listed it as the 59th best console video game of all time, calling it the best shooter on the Genesis. Japanese gaming magazine Famitsu gave it a score of 31 out of 40.

In Japan, Game Machine listed Thunder Force AC on their February 1, 1991 issue as being the sixteenth most-successful table arcade unit of the month.

Famitsu gave Thunder Spirits version a lower score, giving it only 23/40.
