= Arsys Software =

Japanese video game developer

- Logo variant before the rebrand as Cyberhead
- Native name: アルシスソフトウェア
- Company type: Private
- Industry: Video games
- Founded: November 11, 1985; 40 years ago
- Defunct: 2001
- Fate: Dissolved
- Headquarters: Tokyo, Japan
- Key people: Osamu Nagano, Kotori Yoshimura
- Products: Wibarm; Star Cruiser; Air Combat; Battle Zeque Den; Gran Turismo
- Revenue: ¥3 million (2001)
- Number of employees: 3 (2001)
- Website: English (Archived 2001); Japanese (Translated)

Arsys Software (アルシスソフトウェア), later known as Cyberhead (サイバーヘッド), was a Japanese video game development company active from 1985 to 2001.

== Overview ==
The company was founded as Arsys Software by former Technosoft staff members Osamu Nagano and Kotori Yoshimura on 11 November 1985. They were primarily involved in computer game development, having previously created the original Thunder Force (a 1983 free-scrolling shooter game) and Plazma Line (a 1984 space racing game considered the first computer game with 3D polygon graphics) at Technosoft. In 1986, Arsys debuted with the 3D role-playing shooter Wibarm, followed by the free-roaming adventure game Reviver: The Real-Time Adventure in 1987 and the 3D first-person shooter role-playing game Star Cruiser in 1988. When Star Cruiser was released in 1988, the company only had two employees, which grew to a dozen employees by 1991, when development began on Star Cruiser 2; by 2001, the company had reduced to three employees.

In addition to its own products, they also ported games to Japanese computer platforms, such as Prince of Persia and several SystemSoft games. Their Prince of Persia port for the NEC PC-98 featured enhanced visuals, introducing the Prince's classic turban and vest look, and became the basis for later Prince of Persia ports and games by Riverhillsoft and Broderbund. They also contributed to the development of several games from other companies, such as the Namco's 1995 combat flight simulator Air Combat and Sony Computer Entertainment's 1997 racing simulator Gran Turismo both for the PlayStation. They also released the chiptune video game music soundtrack album Arsys Best Selection (アルシス・ベストセレクション) in 1990. The company eventually closed down in 2001.

== Notable releases ==
=== Wibarm ===
The MS-DOS port of Wibarm (1986), an early role-playing shooter that combines shooter and role-playing game elements. Screenshot demonstrates early use of 3D polygon graphics, third-person perspective, and automap feature.

Wibarm (1986), stylized as WiBArM (ウィバーン), is an early role-playing shooter released by Arsys Software for the NEC PC-88 computer in Japan and ported to MS-DOS for Western release by Broderbund. It combines run and gun shooter gameplay with role-playing video game elements, and was also the first action role-playing game to feature 3D polygonal graphics. In Wibarm, the player controls a transformable mecha robot that can shift between walking mode, a tank, and a flying jet. The viewpoint switches between several different perspectives: a 2D top-down perspective while flying, a side-scrolling view during on-foot outdoor exploration, a fully 3D polygonal third-person perspective inside buildings, and arena-style 2D shoot 'em up battles during boss encounters.

The game features a variety of weapons and equipment as well as an automap, and the player can upgrade equipment and earn experience to raise stats. In contrast to first-person RPGs at the time that were restricted to 90-degree movements, Wibarm's use of 3D polygons allows full 360-degree movement. It won the 1986 Game of the Year award from the Japanese computer game magazine Oh!MZ, later known as Oh!X.

=== Reviver ===
Reviver: The Real-Time Adventure, also known as Reviver (リバイバ), is an adventure game designed by Kotori Yoshimura and released by Arsys Software in July 1987, for the NEC PC-88, FM-7, Sharp X1, Sharp MZ and MSX2 platforms. The sub-title, The Real-Time Adventure, is a reference to the game's early use of a real-time persistent world, where time continues to elapse, day-night cycles adjust the brightness of the screen to indicate the time of day, and certain stores and non-player characters would only be available at certain times of the day. The game also gives players direct control over the player character. The game also features a fantasy story, full-colour 2D overhead scrolling graphics, and role-playing video game elements. It won the 1987 Game of the Year award from Japanese gaming magazine Oh!X.

=== Star Cruiser ===
The Mega Drive version of Star Cruiser (1988)

Star Cruiser (スタークルーザー) was a first-person role-playing shooter released for the PC-88 in 1988. The game is considered innovative and ahead of its time, for being an early example of an action role-playing game with fully 3D polygonal graphics, combined with early first-person shooter gameplay, which would occasionally switch to space flight simulator gameplay when exploring the open-ended outer space with six degrees of freedom. All the backgrounds, objects and opponents in the game were rendered in 3D polygons, many years before they were widely adopted by the video game industry. The game also emphasized storytelling, with plot twists and extensive character dialogues, taking place in a futuristic science fiction setting.

It won the 1988 Game of the Year awards from the Japanese computer game magazines POPCOM and Oh!X. The game was later ported to the X68000 computer in 1989, and the Mega Drive (Genesis) video game console in 1990. The game's sequel, Star Cruiser 2, was released in 1992, for the PC-9821 and FM Towns computers. Seven chiptune video game music soundtrack albums of both Star Cruiser games, composed by Toshiya Yamanaka, have been released from 1992 to 2008.

=== Air Combat and Gran Turismo ===
The company contributed to the development of several games from other companies. These include Namco's 1995 combat flight simulator Air Combat and Sony Computer Entertainment's 1997 racing simulator Gran Turismo both for the PlayStation.

== List of video games ==
The following games were developed by the company:

Title	Release	Platform(s)	Note(s)
WiBArM	August 1986 (Japan); August 1989 (North America)	PC-88, PC-98, X1, MZ, FM-7, MS-DOS	3D role-playing shooter. Won 1986 Game of the Year award from Oh!MZ (Oh!X) magazine.
Reviver: The Real-Time Adventure	July 1987	PC-88, FM-7, X1, MZ, MSX2	Free-roaming adventure game. Won 1987 Game of the Year award from Oh!X magazine.
Star Cruiser	August 1988	PC-88, PC-98, X1, X68000, Mega Drive	3D role-playing first-person shooter. Won 1988 Game of the Year awards from POPCOM and Oh!X magazines.
Cyber Armor Wer Dragon	September 1989	PC-88	Scrolling shooter action game.
Knight Arms: The Hyblid Framer	8 December 1989	X68000	3D shooter game. Won 1989 Game of the Year award from LOGiN and Oh!X magazines.
Tenka Touitsu	18 May 1990	X68000	Historical strategy video game. Port of SystemSoft game.
Blitzkrieg Toubu Sensen 1941–45	25 October 1991	X68000	Historical turn-based strategy.
Daisenryaku III '90	20 December 1991	X68000	Port of SystemSoft strategy game.
Spin Dizzy II	10 April 1992	PC-98, X68000	Port of Activision's Spindizzy Worlds.
Prince of Persia	20 July 1990	PC-98, SNES	Cinematic platformer. Enhanced port.
Star Cruiser 2	2 December 1992	PC-98, FM Towns	3D first-person role-playing shooter.
Battle Zeque Den	15 July 1994	SNES	Beat 'em up
Air Combat	30 June 1995	PlayStation	Combat flight simulator. Co-developed with Namco.
Gran Turismo	23 December 1997	PlayStation	Racing simulator. Co-developed with Polys Entertainment.
Omega Boost	22 April 1999	PlayStation	Rail shooter. Co-developed with Polyphony Digital.
Galaxy Knights	July 2001	Windows	Science fiction role-playing video game.
