= Star Cruiser (1988 video game) =

1988 video game

Star Cruiser スター クルーザー Star Quest
- Developer: Arsys Software
- Publishers: Arsys Software; Masaya (Mega Drive)
- Designers: Osamu Nagano; Kotori Yoshimura
- Series: Star Cruiser
- Platforms: PC-8801, PC-9801, X1, X68000, Mega Drive
- Release: PC-8801: JP: May 1988; X1: JP: June 1988; PC-9801: JP: 1989; X68000: JP: April 14, 1989; Mega Drive: JP: December 21, 1990
- Genres: Role-playing, first-person shooter

Star Cruiser (スター クルーザー, Sutā Kurūzā) is a role-playing first-person shooter video game developed by Arsys Software and released in Japan for the PC-8801 and X1 home computers in 1988. The game was released for the PC-9801 and X68000 computers in 1989, and then ported by Masaya (NCS) to the Mega Drive in 1990.

The game is an early example of an action role-playing game with fully 3D polygon graphics, combined with first-person shooter gameplay and space flight simulation when exploring the open-ended outer space with six degrees of freedom. All backgrounds, objects, and opponents in the game are rendered in 3D polygons, years before the technique was widely adopted. The game emphasized storytelling, with plot twists and extensive character dialogues, taking place in a futuristic science fiction setting.

Namco licensed the Mega Drive version of Star Cruiser for a North American release entitled Star Quest, which Namco planned to publish for the Sega Genesis in July 1994. The North American release of Star Quest was eventually canceled.

== Plot ==
The game is set in the future, when 200 years have passed since Central Earth ended a war that began when humans made first contact with aliens. The balance of power, however, is being jeopardized by the militaristic nation VOID, which is attempting to deport all aliens from civilized society, and by the remains of the Earth Federation, the Federation Patrol. VOID is planning to wage war and take control of the galaxy, but a small battalion on the Ganymede satellite of Jupiter is being trained to resist VOID.

The story begins with protagonist Brian training in a simulation set up by his friend and comrade, Gibson, and instructed by his trusted droid, Freddy. After he finishes training, Brian goes to a restaurant, where he is given the news on VOID, which has a nearby base that acts as a stronghold and is sending out threatening enemies. The team cannot confront them directly because of an energy field protecting the base from ordinary weaponry. However, Brian is asked to lead a kamikaze attack, with a starship that can temporarily charge through the energy field with Shield Buster technology. Brian is tasked with crashing into the fortress and destroying it from the inside, and stealing a prototype spacecraft, the Star Cruiser, to even the odds in the war. Shortly after the briefing, their own Ganymede base is attacked by VOID. The protagonist eventually embarks on a quest involving the exploration of the galaxy.

== Characters ==
Hunter Guild Side

- Brian Wright: The main character of this game. A well spoken man with a calm personality, the game's female lead Diana renders him to be somewhat of a cold-hearted hero. The Galactic Federal Ambassador told Brian that he had quite special qualities and talents as a Space Diplomat; if the current ambassador of the human race on the human side dies due to an unexpected accident, there is a possibility that it may be forced to take prolongation measures, possibly making Brian the leader. In Star Cruiser MD, Brian's name is freely attached to the player, as they can choose the name that they want to have throughout the campaign, though leaving the box empty delivers "Brian" as the default name, resemblant to how naming was handled in Phantasy Star II; because the game allowed for a custom name for a silent protagonist, Star Cruiser MD made it possible for the player to imagine that they were playing the game as a woman, though the notation of "he" during lines where Brian is described ultimately debunked this concept.
- Freddie (Star Cruiser MD only): A robot who speaks on behalf of Brian in Star Cruiser MD. According to his own words in the game, he can't help his tendency to speak because Brian is silent. In the original PC-88 version and its ports, a generic COM Unit is in Freddie's place as part of a computer mounted in Brian's Star Cruiser and Land Tank vehicles, and it exists only to explain the situations that occur when using the "check" and "move" commands in-game. There has been speculation among fans that Freddie was possibly named after Queen singer Freddie Mercury, though this has yet to be confirmed by any of the Mega Drive version's developers.
- Daniel Gibson: Brian's best friend. While at Jupiter's "Big Red Team", Brian took over VOID's latest ship (in this case, the Star Cruiser) at that time; it seems that the name of the team came from the name of a cocktail containing a Pearl Onion instead of a Martini Olive. In Star Cruiser II: The Odysseus Project, because the grandchild of Hidari Daigo (Sakai Daigo in Star Cruiser MD), Yuko, is a lover of Daniel, the relationship between the two is not accepted by Daigo, and it seems that Daniel had to respond to consultation threatened by Brian and Diana once or twice, on the matter.
- Diana Gurdis: A female crew member worried about Brian, she is considered to be a heroine in the story. While on an alien planet, looking at one of the restaurants' fast food menus, somebody said to her "You are a star full of aliens", in description of Earth's people; in response, she tells them: "This is not the star of an alien: We (the people of Earth) are aliens".
- Hidari Daigo (Sakai Daigo in Star Cruiser MD): A scientist who was captured by VOID and was the developer of the Star Cruiser. Yuko is his grandchild.
- Masashi Clark: Head Leader of the Sol Star System Hunters.

VOID Side

- Bio: A computer which was placed inside the Star Cruiser while Hidari was unaware; it is fought inside the ship. After the system was defeated, it was converted into both a Guest and Conference Room.
- VOID-MAX (Guist Needeman in Star Cruiser MD): An alien whose primary purpose is to guide the activities of terrorism in an attempt to establish a Human Only universe.
- NUKE (Nucleus): A source of emerging drugs. NUKE is not just a drug, however: it is a biological weapon released by descendants of the tribe who had been forced into slavery and obedience to the empire made by the ancestors of human beings in order to destroy mankind.

== Gameplay ==
The Mega Drive version of Star Cruiser

The game involves the exploration of four solar systems with over 30 planets and dozens of characters. It is viewed entirely from a first-person perspective, with 3D polygon graphics used to represent outdoor environments, trees, benches, buildings, and other objects, as well as enemies.

In a city, the player character can move around town and enter various buildings to interact with non-player characters, who are represented with an anime-like appearance, or leave the city and go into outer space. When the player goes into outer space, they can fly to other planets, moving around in free flight, but occasionally encountering enemies and engaging in space combat. There is an autopilot feature available, setting the spacecraft to automatically go to a set destination, but the player may still encounter enemies along the way. There is also a warp feature available, allowing the player to warp to different locations, but this requires energy. On various planet surfaces, the player will explore enemy bases and combat enemies on the ground. At enemy bases, the game plays like a first-person shooter, exploring a dungeon while moving, strafing and shooting enemies in a first-person perspective. Enemy bases usually need to be cleared by finding hidden keys, unlocking doors and finding key items and objects.

It does not use a traditional levelling system, but uses various role-playing game elements. The player can acquire different weapons and can customize craft to an extent, while needing to upgrade equipment, the shields that behave like hit points, the space craft's speed of movement in outer space, and the energy needed to move around, shoot, travel and warp between destinations. The player can also go to a mechanic to repair equipment and shields as well as restore energy.

=== Differences in Star Cruiser MD ===
- The name of the protagonist can be changed.
- Daiseki is a Restaurant; as Kanji is not used in Star Cruiser MD, this is the name of what would otherwise be the bar for Big Red Group.
- The 3D stages on each planet and station fully utilize the gameplay of Labyrinth Warfare, and battle seamlessly occurs in the labyrinth in Realtime without shifting from the maze to the battlefield, as how the PC-88 version and its ports had done. This battle style would later be adopted by and used outright in Star Cruiser II.
- Since there is no concept of money, there is no need to do grinding from the Space Pirates when traveling; if the players go to a dock, service is always free, the shield will be repaired and the fuel can refill.
- Hidari Daigo and Yuko's surname is changed to Sakai.
- Portrayal of the Solar Wind Base is partly different.
- Only the Cutty Sark, the Red Star Cruiser, shows up in this game, while the Blue Star Cruiser doesn't appear.

== Reception ==
Reception

Review score
Publication	Score
Famitsu	5/10, 7/10, 7/10, 5/10 (Mega Drive)

The home computer versions were critically acclaimed. The original PC-8801 and X1 versions won two 1988 awards from Japanese computer magazines, including Best Adventure Game from POPCOM and Best Special Effects from Oh!X. The X68000 version also won several 1989 awards from Japanese computer magazines, including Best Action Game and overall Best Software from LOGiN, and Best Special Effects from Oh!X. The X68000 version was also a runner-up for two other 1989 awards from Oh!X, coming third place for Best Theme Music (below Bosconian and Genocide) and fourth place for overall Game of the Year (below After Burner, Genocide and Tetris).

In Japan, the four critics in Famicom Tsūshin gave the Mega Drive version scores of 5, 7, 7 and 5 out of 10. In North America, the June 1994 issue of Electronic Gaming Monthly, in its "Fact Files" section, reviewed Namco's unreleased Sega Genesis version, noting that the English localization was 100% complete. They gave it a positive review, stating that it "packs a good blend of action and role-playing" along with a "strategy" theme, exploration and character interaction. They criticized the space flight segments for "imperfect and hazy" controls, but praised the game overall for providing "hours of solid gameplay". In the United Kingdom, however, the September 1993 issue of Sega Power criticized the Japanese import version of Star Cruiser, stating it is "unplayable" because of the Japanese-language "question and response" scenes, giving it a one-star score. Japanese site 4gamer retrospectively reviewed the game in 2008 and described it as a "masterpiece". Sega-16 reviewed the English fan translation in 2016 and gave it a positive review, calling it "a top notch game" with "impressive 3D graphics, well drawn manga character design, quite good music and a very well written plot".

== Legacy ==
In 2008, video game designer Hideki Kamiya listed Star Cruiser among his favorite games of all time.

The PC-8801 and X68000 versions of Star Cruiser were released for Windows in Japan on April 29, 2008, and November 29, 2011, respectively.

In September 2016, an English translation beta patch was released through ROM hacking, followed by a complete translation patch in November. The X68000 version was translated in 2019.

=== Sequel ===
The game's sequel, Star Cruiser II: The Odysseus Project, was released in 1992 for the PC-9821 and FM Towns computers; it has since seen an English translation for the PC-98. Although a port of Star Cruiser II was planned for MS-DOS, it is unknown as to whether or not it was ever developed or even released.

== See also ==
- History of Eastern role-playing video games
