= Mini-map =

Miniature version of a map

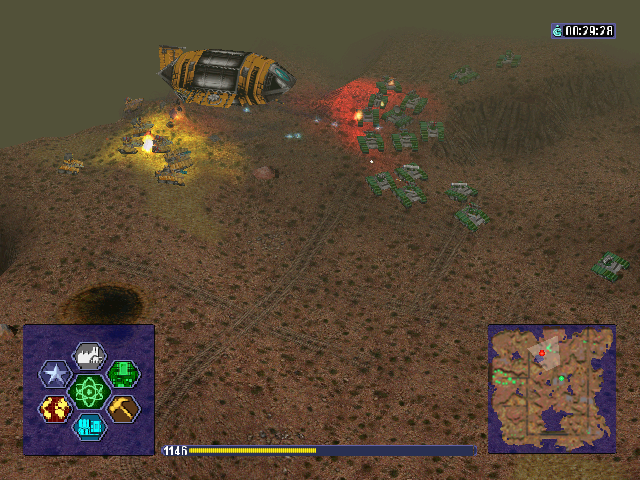
A mini-map (bottom right corner) as seen in Warzone 2100

A mini-map or minimap is a miniature map HUD element that is often placed at a screen corner in video games to help players in orienting themselves within the game world. They are often only a small portion of the screen and must be selective in what details they display. Elements included on mini-maps vary by video game genre, but most minimaps feature at least one or more of the following: the position of the player character, allied units, structures, enemies, objectives, and surrounding terrain.

Mini-maps have become common in real-time strategy and MMORPG video games because they serve as an indication of where the current screen lies within the scope of the game world. Most first-person shooter games also have some version or variant of the mini-map, often showing enemy and teammates locations in real-time.

== History ==
Mini-maps have been around since the age of arcade video games. The term radar was used through the 1980s instead of mini-map. Battlezone (1980) and Horizon V (1982), have an overhead-view, circular radar showing the locations of enemies. Rally-X (1980) and Defender (1981) have a miniature, rectangular view of the entire scrolling world above or on the side of the play area, allowing players to see enemies that aren't on the screen.

== Features ==
Many mini-maps make use of similar features. Common features are:

=== Fog of war ===
In many games using a mini-map, the mini-map begins completely blank, while the map is automatically drawn as the player discovers new areas of the game world. After players discover new areas, the terrain of the discovered area often remains visible on the mini-map. If the player's characters or units cease to see the area, the area might be covered by a fog of war, so that unit or structure movements in that area will not be shown. Things in a fog of war portion of a mini-map may not be updated until they are rediscovered.

=== Layers ===
Similar to custom layers in Google Earth, some team-oriented multiplayer games, such as Age of Empires II or Empire Earth, allow players to draw temporary lines, signals or markings on the mini-map for others to see. This allows for quick communication over large distances in games.

=== Rotation and zoom ===
In some 3D video games, the mini-map rotates when the player character or game camera faces different directions to keep the top of the map always corresponding to forward from the camera's point of view. This is common for games in the Grand Theft Auto series, and many racing games that show the track in a mini-map. In other games such as The Legend of Zelda series, the map does not rotate but features an arrow that moves about and rotates to show the player character's position and the direction they're facing. In some games, mini-maps that only show the close surrounding area often have icons on the edge to show the direction of locations or characters outside the area shown on the map. Some games also have a feature where the mini-map zooms out when the player character is travelling at high speed and zooms back in when they slow down.

== Automap ==
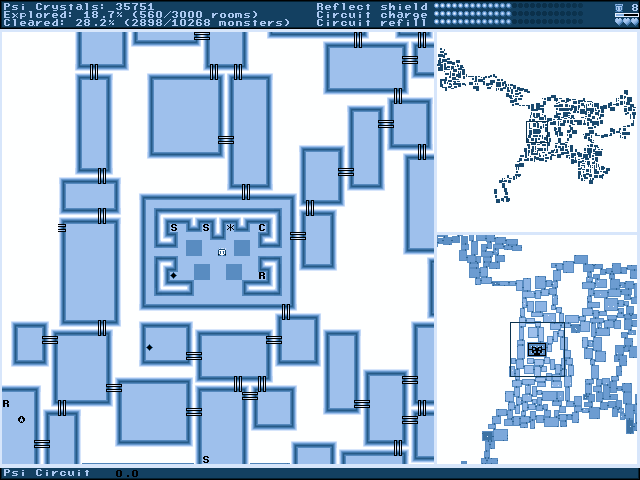
The automap feature in Meritous

An Automap is similar to a mini-map but traces its origin back to early role-playing games. In early dungeon crawl video games, players were expected to draw maps by hand as they played the game to solve complex mazes and explore large dungeons. Game boxes such as those for early 1980s Wizardry games included graph paper for this purpose.

Games featuring automapping simulate the creation of a map, typically showing an abstract top-down view of nearby areas of the game world that is automatically updated as the player character gains knowledge of the environment. Automaps typically display doors, terrain types, and important locations or items. When discussing The Bard's Tale III's role as one of the first CRPGs with automapping, Computer Gaming World in 1994 wondered "How did we ever play without it?".

Early automaps typically found in role-playing video games were pause screens that stopped gameplay when opened. Early examples of video games to feature a real-time automap include Sirius Software's Wayout in 1982 and Arsys Software's WiBArm in 1986. When the feature became popular with action-oriented games such as Doom and Diablo, the automap feature in these games did not pause the game and allowed the player to continue gameplay while the map was on screen.

MUDs, which were popular multiplayer virtual worlds in the mid-1990s, rarely provided an automap. This resulted in MUD clients adding automapping as a feature, notably zMUD in September 1996.

== Code minimap in text editors and IDEs ==
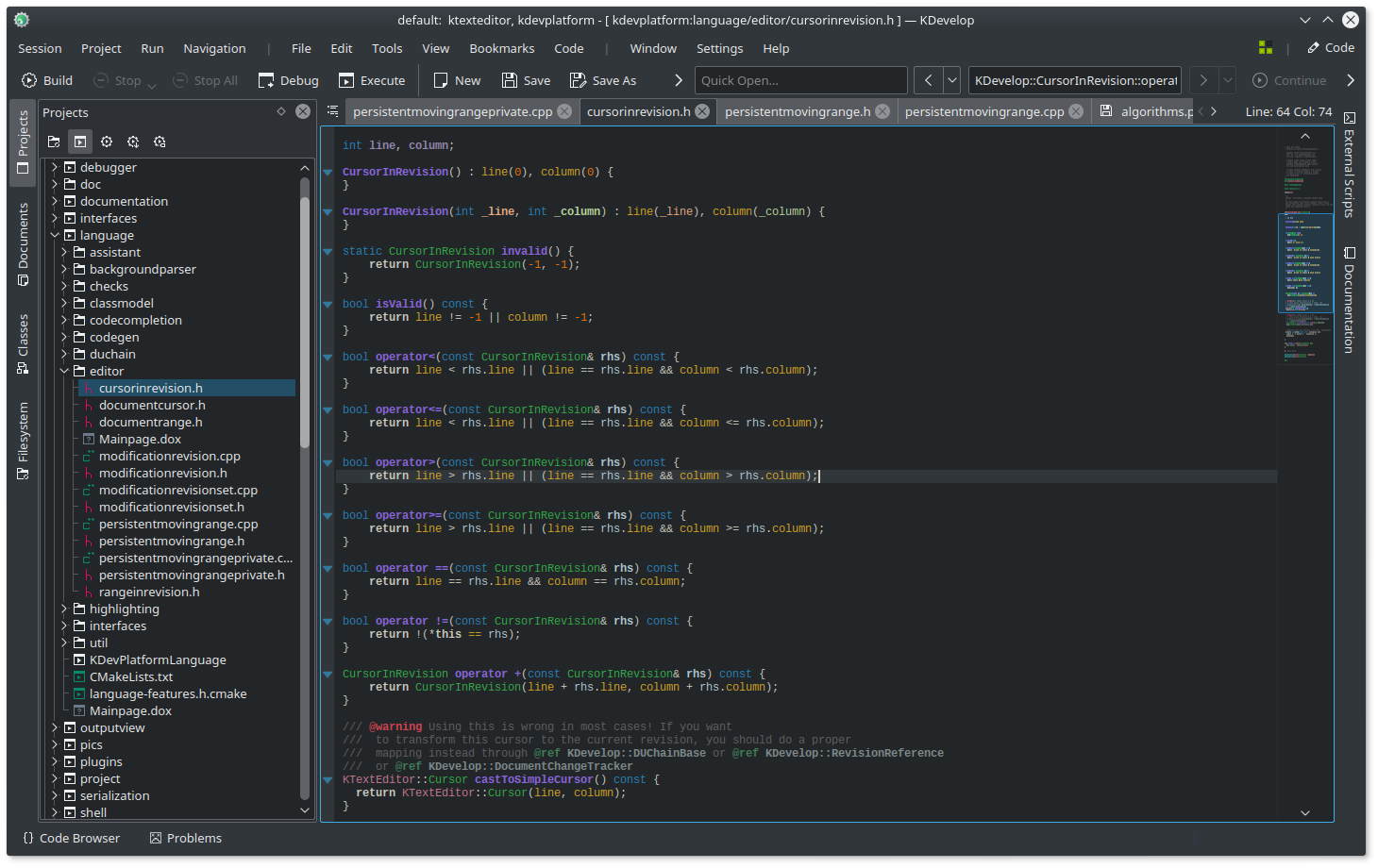
The IDE KDevelop showing a code minimap in the right corner of the screen

A code minimap in a text editor or Integrated development environment (IDE) is a reduced overview of the entire file in its own view pane, typically next to the main editor pane. The portion of the file visible in the main editor pane is highlighted, and clicking or dragging in this view scrolls the editor through the file.

== See also ==
- Overworld
