= JR-BASIC =

Dialect of the BASIC programming language

- Paradigm: imperative, algorithmic
- Developer: Matsushita Communication Industrial Co., Ltd.
- First appeared: 1981; 44 years ago
- Stable release: 5.0
- OS: Matsushita JR series

Dialects
- BASIC

Influenced by
- Microsoft BASIC

Influenced
- None

JR-BASIC is a dialect of the BASIC programming language running on the Matsushita JR series of microcomputers.

Although it's its own dialect, it was designed to be mostly compatible with Microsoft BASIC. Since it was developed for low-cost entry-level machines, it featured as few functions as possible, in order to save computer resources. Nevertheless, the interpreter was intended to be compact and efficient, with a feature-rich screen editor supporting direct execution of BASIC instructions.

Commands were input by keywords - by pressing a combination of control and alphabet keys, a full command word would be entered. This was faster and more comfortable than typing words letter by letter, as the computer keyboard was poor (chiclet keyboard).

== JR-BASIC 1.0 ==
JR-BASIC 1.0 is the original version present on the JR-100 computer, released in 1981.

=== Specifications ===
Constants	Integer (-32767 to +32767); Hexadecimal; String
Integer variables	Alphabet or alphabet + number (ex: A, B1)
String variables	Alphabet + $ (ex: D $, W $); Up to 32 characters
Arrays	One dimension (ex: E (5)); Two dimensions (ex: F (X, Y))
Calculations	Addition (+), Subtraction (-), Multiplication (*), Division (/), Remainder (MOD)
Commands and Statements	AUTO, BEEP, CLEAR, CLS, CONT, DATA, DIM, END, FIND, FOR - NEXT, GOSUB - RETURN, GOTO, HCOPY, IF - THEN, INPUT, LET, LIST, LLIST, LOAD, LOCATE, LPRINT, MLOAD, MSAVE, NEW, OPTION, PICK, POKE, PRINT, READ, REM, RESTORE, RUN, SAVE, STOP, VERIFY
Functions	ABS, ASC, CHR $, FRE, FLD, HEX $, HPOS, VPOS, LEFT $, LEN, MID $, MOD, PEEK, RIGHT $, RND, SGN, SPC, TAB, USR, VAL
Line numbers	1 to 32767

=== Keyboard commands ===
Key combinations allowed the user to enter commands and control the onscreen basic interpreter.

Standard input key	Control mapping
1	(HOME)
2	VERIFY
3	SAVE
4	LOAD
5	(DELETE)
6	(←)
7	(↓)
8	(↑)
9	(→)
0	(INSERT)
–	(RUBOUT)
Q	GOSUB
W	RET
E	END
R	RUN
T	THEN
Y	LOCATE
U	IF
I	INPUT
O	OPTION
P	PRINT
A	AUTO
S	STOP
D	DIM
F	FOR
G	GOTO
H	POKE
J	RND (
K	READ
L	LIST
;	CHR $ (
:	REM
Z	(L.INS)
X	(CANCEL)
C	(BREAK)
V	(GRAPH)
B	HCOPY
N	NEXT
M	CLS
,	DATA
.	PEEK (

== JR-BASIC 5.0 ==
The JR-200 model, released in 1983, came with JR-BASIC 5.0 that added extended functionally like graphical commands such as COLOR, (which selected character color, background color and display mode) and PLOT which permitted direct addressing of the low resolution graphics mode (64×48, using text semigraphics characters, which represented pixel blocks that used one-quarter of each character). Eight colors were available for the background and foreground use: blue, red, magenta, green, cyan, yellow, white and black. By re-programming a part of the character-set a limited high resolution graphics mode was achievable with a resolution of 256×192.

== See also ==
- Matsushita JR series
- List of BASIC dialects
- List of BASIC dialects by platform
