= Thunder Force IV =

1992 video game

- European Mega Drive box art
- Developer: Technosoft
- Publishers: JP: Technosoft; NA/EU: Sega
- Series: Thunder Force
- Platforms: Mega Drive/Genesis, Sega Saturn, Nintendo Switch
- Release: Mega Drive/Genesis: JP: July 24, 1992; EU: December 10, 1992; NA: January 1993; Saturn: JP: November 29, 1996; Switch: WW: September 20, 2018
- Genre: Shoot 'em up
- Mode: Single-player

Thunder Force IV, (Note: Japanese: サンダーフォースIV, Hepburn: Sandā Fōsu IV) known in North America as Lightening Force: Quest for the Darkstar, is a 1992 shoot 'em up video game developed and published by Technosoft for the Mega Drive/Genesis. It is the fourth installment in Technosoft's Thunder Force series, and the third and final one created for the Mega Drive. It was developed by the team at Technosoft that ported Devil's Crush to the Mega Drive rather than the team that developed the previous Thunder Force games. Like its predecessors, it is a horizontally scrolling shooter, but it also features extensive vertical scrolling with large playing fields.

The game was considered to be one of the best shooters on the Mega Drive when it was launched. Critics especially praised the game's graphics, including the vertical and parallax scrolling for illustrating the immense environments; however, some believed that underneath the graphical sheen, the gameplay was relatively average. Thunder Force IV was re-released on the Sega Saturn in 1996 and the Nintendo Switch in 2018.

== Gameplay ==
Fire LEO-04 Rynex battling against Gargoyle Diver, the first stage boss in Thunder Force IV

Thunder Force IV is a horizontal shoot 'em up. The story takes place two years after the events of Thunder Force III. The player takes on the role of a fighter pilot to battle the Orn Empire, which is plotting the extinction of the human race. The first four stages can be selected in any order. There are ten stages total. They scroll horizontally automatically, and the player can also explore up and down to scroll the screen vertically and reveal a larger playing field. The player can change the speed of their ship at any time for easier maneuverability. Scrolling up and down will reveal different waves of enemies the player can shoot down, as well as hidden power-ups. At the end of each stage is a boss, and sometimes there are bosses mid-stage.

Some enemies will drop power-ups that if picked up by the player will arm the ship with new weaponry, including a variety of missiles and lasers that fire in different patterns. Each weapon has advantages and drawbacks, and is more or less effective depending on the battle situation the player finds themselves in. The player can hold multiple weapons and cycle through them at will. Other power-ups include shields and satellite ships that revolve around their ship and multiply their firepower. Half-way through the game, the player gains a powerful "Thunder Sword" attack which deals massive damage to enemies. It requires that the player have two satellite ships.

== Development ==
Thunder Force IV was developed in Japan by Technosoft as the third Thunder Force game for the Mega Drive. Only the sound department was brought over from the original staff of Thunder Force II (1988) and Thunder Force III (1990); the rest of the team had previously ported the pinball game Devil's Crush to the Mega Drive. They chose to develop Thunder Force IV when given the opportunity to develop an original game. Having taken the reins for the Thunder Force series, the team felt a responsibility to surpass the quality of earlier series titles. They borrowed code from the previous games, and built upon it using what they learned when porting Devil's Crush. The composer for Thunder Force IV previously worked on Thunder Force III and also composed some original music for Devil's Crush. The sound team staff, led by Naosuke Arai, were fans of heavy metal, so they worked on finding a method to create an electric guitar sound using the Mega Drive's FM synthesizer. They ran into difficulties and eventually settled on using the system's distortion sound effects to positive results.

== Release ==
Technosoft held a promotional event for the game at a convention in Tokyo on June 7, 1992. The event included a tournament, giving fans an early opportunity to play the game. The game was released in Japan on July 24, 1992, in Europe on December 10 the same year, and North America in January 1993. Sega of America renamed the North American version to Lightening Force: Quest for the Darkstar.

The game was ported to the Sega Saturn as a part of Thunder Force: Gold Pack 2, a compilation disc released on November 29, 1996, in Japan. The compilation also includes Thunder Force AC (an arcade port of Thunder Force III). This version improved on the original by eliminating sluggish frame rate issues, adding an easier mode which gives the player bonus defensive abilities, as well as adding the fighter from Thunder Force III as a secret playable ship.

In 2016, Sega acquired the rights to the Thunder Force series. Two years later, the game was released on September 20, 2018, along with Sonic the Hedgehog (1991) on Nintendo Switch and other Sega games under the Sega Ages brand. Players can choose between the Japanese and international versions and take advantage of the improvements and other features from the Saturn port.

== Reception ==
Reception

Review scores
Publication	Score
AllGame	4/5
Computer and Video Games	93%
Famitsu	23/40
GameFan	96.5% (Note: Average of two reviews: 98% and 95%)
Mega Drive Advanced Gaming	94%
Mean Machines	87%
Sega Force	88%
Mega	81%

Thunder Force IV was quickly identified as one of the best Mega Drive shooters when it was released. Critics agreed that the graphics were one of the game's best qualities. Mean Machines called them "state of the art" and highlighted the vertical scrolling for "evoking a sense of vastness". The vertical scrolling also impressed other journalists. Mega wrote that the landscapes were expansive, and appreciated the parallax scrolling effects. The parallax scrolling was also picked up by Mega Drive Advanced Gaming, which called it "the most stunning use of parallax ever seen on the 16-bit Sega". They believed the game pushed the technical capabilities of the Mega Drive. Other visual aspects highlighted by critics included the large sprites and smooth animation. Most critics liked the music and sound effects as well. Mega disliked the music, calling it "aimless, twittery, Japanese meanderings". GameFan called the graphics and sound great quality considering the game was on a cartridge and not a CD. The graphical quality came at a cost however, as some reviewers experienced slow frame rate issues when the screen was busy with action.

The high quality presentation of Thunder Force IV was not enough to cover up some concerns with its gameplay. While most critics enjoyed the game, even calling it "addictive" and "pure adrenaline", some thought the game lacked originality and felt like an average shooter. Mean Machines wrote that it was similar to Thunder Force III and called it ""the best shoot 'em up you'll get on the Mega Drive, but suffers from complete lack of originality. This is the genre taken to its extreme". Sega Force agreed that it was similar to the earlier Thunder Force games. Mega added on to this, saying "beneath the graphical gymnastics of the surface, the game really is...decidedly average". Critics that were more receptive to the gameplay commended the level of difficulty, the ability to pick the stage order, and the variety of weapons and power-ups.

=== Retrospective coverage ===
Thunder Force IV continues to be regarded as one of the best shoot 'em ups of its era. IGN rated it as the fourth best classic shoot 'em up, calling it Technosoft's best shooter and "the pinnacle of Genesis shooters". Retro Gamer placed it among their top ten Mega Drive games, praising its sense of scale, exotic environments, frenetic action, and graphical fidelity. In another review, Retro Gamer called Thunder Force IV "Technosoft's masterpiece" and an essential game for shooter fans. Both USGamer and Hardcore Gaming 101 discussed the game's presentation in high regard. At Kotaku, Peter Tieryas described it as "the ultimate adrenaline rush and hands down one of the best shooters on the Sega Genesis". Paul Brownlee, writing for Hardcore Gaming 101, called it one of the best looking Mega Drive games and said of the soundtrack: "It's one of the best on the system from both an artistic and technical standpoint, standing among greats such as Streets of Rage 2 and MUSHA".
