= Matsushita JR series =

Brand of microcomputers

The National JR series (including some models also sold as the Panasonic JR) was a line of 8-bit personal computers developed by Matsushita Communication Industrial Co., Ltd., a division of Matsushita Electric Industrial (now Panasonic). Based on the success of the Sharp MZ and NEC PC-8000 series, these computers aimed primarily at the home computer and educational markets during the early 1980s.

The JR series included four computer models: the JR-100, the JR-200, the JR-300 and the JR-800. All four were sold under Matsushita's 'National' brand; the JR-100 and JR-200U were also sold elsewhere as 'Panasonic' (another Matsushita brand).

The JR series found a strong foothold in Japanese schools, particularly the JR-200, which became a standard machine for teaching programming in BASIC.

== JR-100 ==
The National JR-100 (sold in some markets as the Panasonic JR-100) was released on November 21, 1981, with a price of 54,800 yen. It was the cheapest domestically produced personal computer at the time of its release.

Like the Hitachi Basic Master and Sharp MZ-80, it was a low-performance, low-priced personal computer offering basic semi-graphic character based graphics, a monochrome display, and minimal sound ability. The CPU was an 8-bit Panasonic MN1800A NMOS microprocessor (compatible with the Motorola MC6802, a slightly improved version of the Motorola MC6800) running at a slow 0.89 MHz, and it came with 16 KB of RAM (expandable to 32 KB). Compared to the cheaper imported Sinclair ZX81 (38,700 yen), the larger RAM on the JR100 made it possible to create better programs.

The computer case is angular and cream-colored, measuring 296mm wide x 154mm deep x 45mm high, being extremely compact. The green keyboard was made of rubber due to its low price, and was mockingly called the "eraser keyboard". It had a shortcut key function, allowing users to enter commands in one go. There was no space bar at the bottom, and the right shift key was replaced with a space bar.

Specifications:

- CPU: MN1800A (MC6802 compatible)
- Clock speed: 890 kHz
- RAM: 16-32 KB
- ROM: 8 KB
- Graphics: Monochrome; 32 × 24 text characters; 64 × 48 semi-graphic characters with 8 × 8 pixel matrix
- Sound: Internal speaker
- Connections: Monitor, Expansion, Tape (Frequency-shift keying encoding with 1200 Hz for space and 2400 Hz for mark; 600 baud)
- OS: JR-BASIC 1.0

== JR-200 ==
The National JR-200 (also sold as the Panasonic JR-200U variant in some countries) was released at the end of 1982 with a price of 79,800 yen. It was a higher-end model than the JR-100, but not compatible with this machine.

The JR-200 is made of silver grey plastic, and has a black matte area around the chiclet keyboard area. It used the same MN1800A CPU as the previous model, but added a second processor, the 4-bit MN1544CJR, which is used for I/O and contains 128 bytes of RAM plus four kilobytes of ROM.

The computer received favorable reviews on its launch. Creative Computing wrote "The Panasonic JR-200 is one of the nicest new computers to make the scene in some time."

=== Specifications ===
- CPU: MN1800A + MN1544
- Clock speed: 890 kHz
- RAM: 36 KB
- ROM: 16 KB
- Graphics: 8 colors (black, blue, red, magenta, green, cyan, yellow, white); 256 × 192; 32 × 24 text characters; 64 × 48 semi-graphic characters with 8 × 8 pixel matrix
- Sound: 3 voices, 5 octaves, square wave. Generated by the MN1271 sound, I/O and timer chip.
- Connections: Composite and RF video, expansion, tape (600/2400 baud), printer port, floppy drive, joystick
- OS: JR-BASIC 5.0

=== International Variants ===
Versions of the JR-200 were developed for the North American and European markets and announced in January 1983:

- JR-200U: Designed for North American and European markets, with modified power supply and video output standards;
- JR-200UP: Included a built-in printer interface to meet business and educational needs.

== JR-300 ==
The National JR-300, released in 1984 with a price of 159,000 yen, was completely redesigned in comparison with the earlier JR-100 and JR-200 models. The JR-300 was a hybrid 8/16-bit machine, having a Zilog Z80A CPU as well as a second MN1800A CPU to allow backwards compatibility with the JR-200.

It was advertised as "PC & TV 300" and came standard with a genlock function. A dedicated display (TH15-M300) was available for this. The size and design are similar to the Matsushita MSX machines with separate keyboard.

The JR-300 was primarily delivered to schools as an educational computer, and only a very limited number of machines were released to the general public.

=== Specifications ===
- CPU: MN1800A + Z80A
- Clock speed: 4 MHz
- RAM: 82 KB
- ROM: 40 KB
- Graphics: 8 colors; 320 × 200, 640 × 200, 640 × 400
- Sound: Yamaha 8910 (3 voices, 5 octaves)
- Connections: RGB, Composite and RF video, sound out, expansion, tape (600/2400 baud), printer port, floppy drive, joystick
- OS: JR-BASIC 5.0, Extended Basic

== JR-800 ==
A handheld model called the National JR-800 was launched in 1983 with a price of 128,000 yen, but it was not compatible with the previous JR computers. It was based around a Hitachi HD63A01V CPU (MC6801 compatible) running at 4.9152 MHz, with 16 KB of RAM, and featured a 192 × 64 pixel LCD screen.

It was a B5 sized handheld computer, powered by four AA batteries or an AC adapter. A dedicated portable printer, the JR-P20, was also released.

=== Specifications ===
- CPU: HD63A01V
- Clock speed: 4.9152 MHz
- RAM: 16 KB
- ROM: 16 KB
- Graphics: monochrome LCD, 32 × 8 characters; 192 × 64 pixels
- Connections: tape, RS-232, printer, sound
- OS: BASIC

== Character set ==
The table below shows the semigraphics character set available on the Matsushita JR series, as shown on the operations manual. Characters are rendered using modern equivalents, the exact hardware font it not simulated.

	2	3	4	5	8	9	E	F
0		0	@	P		┌	◯	┘
1	!	1	A	Q	♠	▁	▗	▏
2	“	2	B	R	♥	▂	▞	▎
3	#	3	C	S	♦	▃	▙	▖
4	$	4	D	T	♣	▄	▛	▌
5	%	5	E	U	⬣	▅	▎	▊
6	&	6	F	V	←	▆	▜	▟
7	'	7	G	W	↓	▇	▚	▟
8	(	8	H	X	↑	├	▐	▘
9	)	9	I	Y	→	┤	┼	▊
A	*	:	J	Z	🛉	│	▒	▝
B	+	;	K	[	☺	─	┬	◟
C	,	<	L	¥	▓	◣	┴	●
D	-	=	M	]	┐	◝	░	◞
E	.	>	N	^	█	╳	▀	◜
F	/	?	O	_	◢	╱	└	╲

== Software ==
There are 72 games on this list.

Title	Japanese title	Product code	Publisher	Year	Model
2001: A Space Odyssey	2001年宇宙の旅	JR-T23 (National; release unconfirmed)	Technosoft; National (Matsushita)	1982	JR-100
2001: A Space Odyssey, Part II	2001年宇宙の旅パートII	JR-T24 (National)	National (Matsushita); Technosoft	1982	JR-100
4D Warp	4Dワープ	CE-1	Central Soft		JR-200
Aldebaran #1	アルデバラン #1	JR-T19	National (Matsushita)		JR-100
Aldebaran Part 1	アルデバラン	JR-TB01	National (Matsushita)	1982	JR-200
Bingo Game (JR-100)	ビンゴゲーム (JR-100)	JR-T14	National (Matsushita)		JR-100
Bingo Game (JR-200)	ビンゴゲーム (JR-200)	JR-TB03	National (Matsushita)	1982	JR-200
Blackjack (JR-200)	ブラックジャック (JR-200)	JR-TB06	National (Matsushita)	1982	JR-200
Block Kuzushi (National)	ブロックくずし (National)	JR-T15	National (Matsushita)	1982	JR-100
Block Kuzushi (SYPAC Soft)	ブロックくずし (SYPAC Soft)	S-101	SYPAC Soft (Cypress)		JR-200
Bomber Robo	ボンバーロボ	CE-5	Central Soft		JR-200
Bombing Game	バクゲキゲーム	S-108	SYPAC Soft (Cypress)		JR-200
Breakdown	ブレークダウン	JR-TB10	National (Matsushita)		JR-200
Bridge	ブリッジ	S-104	SYPAC Soft (Cypress)		JR-200
Car Race (JR-100)	カーレース (JR-100)	JR-T11	National (Matsushita)		JR-100
Car Race (JR-200)	カーレース (JR-200)	JR-TB02	National (Matsushita)		JR-200
Car Racer	カーレーサー	J-1006	Hudson Soft	1982	JR-100
Computer BUG9000	コンピュータBUG9000	JR-T27	National (Matsushita)		JR-100
Cosmic Patrol		JR-TU77	Instant Software	1983	JR-200U
Crazy Mazey (Compac)	クレイジーメイジー (Compac)		Compac		JR-200
Crazy Mazey (Datamost)			Datamost	1983	JR-200U
Cross Country	クロスカントリー	CE-6	Central Soft		JR-200
Dog Walk	ドッグウォーク	JR-T26	National (Matsushita)	1982	JR-100
Four-Dimensional Fever	4次元フィーバー	JR-TB07	National (Matsushita)		JR-200
Galactic Chase		JR-TU82	TMQ Software	1983	JR-200U
Games to Play with the Computer 1 / Games and Puzzles to Watch	コンピュータと遊ぶゲーム1／見て楽しむゲームとパズル	JR-T02	National (Matsushita)		JR-100
Games to Play with the Computer 2	コンピュータと遊ぶゲーム (2)	JR-T03	National (Matsushita)	1981	JR-100
Games to Play with the Computer 3	コンピュータと遊ぶゲーム3	JR-T04	National (Matsushita)		JR-100
German Air Force Operation	ドイツ空軍大作戦	JR-TB30	National (Matsushita)		JR-200
Golf	ゴルフ	JR-TB22	National (Matsushita)		JR-200
Heli Bomber	ヘリボンバー	S-102	SYPAC Soft (Cypress)		JR-200
ICBM Interception Operation (JR-100)	ICBM迎撃作戦 (JR-100)	JR-T20	National (Matsushita)	1982	JR-100
ICBM Interception Operation (JR-200)	ICBM迎撃作戦 (JR-200)	JR-TB04	National (Matsushita)		JR-200
Invader	インベーダー	J-1007 (Hudson Soft); JR-T12 (National)	Hudson Soft; National (Matsushita)	1982	JR-100
Joe Junk Man		JR-TU74	TMQ Software	1983	JR-200U
Jumping Crash	ジャンピングクラッシュ	JR-T10	National (Matsushita)		JR-100
Lejack	レジャック	S-105	SYPAC Soft (Cypress)		JR-200
Mahjong	麻雀	JR-TB23	National (Matsushita)		JR-200
Mars Cars		JR-TU67	Datamost	1983	JR-200U
Medieval Quest		JR-TU65	Instant Software	1983	JR-200U
Monkey Up	モンキーアップ	JR-TB08	National (Matsushita)		JR-200
Nihon tai JR	日本対JR		Dempa Shimbunsha		JR-100
Othello	オセロ	CE-3	Central Soft		JR-200
Pearl Harbor Operation	パールハーバー大作戦	JR-TB26	National (Matsushita)		JR-200
Phaser Command		JR-TU64	Instant Software	1983	JR-200U
Pig Pen		JR-TU73	TMQ Software	1983	JR-200U
Planet Wars	プラネットウォーズ	JR-T25 (National); J-1020 (Tecno Hudson)	National (Matsushita); Tecno Hudson	1982	JR-100
Poker (JR-100)	ポーカー (JR-100)	JR-T21	National (Matsushita)	1982	JR-100
Poker (JR-200)	ポーカー (JR-200)	JR-TB05	National (Matsushita)		JR-200
Ramrom Patrol		JR-TU79	Instant Software	1983	JR-200U
Rat Patrol		JR-TU61	TMQ Software	1983	JR-200U
Santa Paravia and Fiumaccio		JR-TU63	Instant Software	1983	JR-200U
School on Fire	スクールファイアー	S-103	SYPAC Soft (Cypress)		JR-200
Sea of Japan Operation	日本海大作戦		National (Matsushita)		JR-200
Sea Snake	シースネーク	CE-4	Central Soft		JR-200
Shinsengumi: Ikedaya Operation	新撰組 池田屋大作戦	JR-TB27	National (Matsushita)		JR-200
Solitaire			Datamost	1983	JR-200U
Space Game	スペースゲーム	S-106	SYPAC Soft (Cypress)		JR-200
Star Fighter	スターファイター	S-107	SYPAC Soft (Cypress)		JR-200
Star Trek	スタートレック	JR-TB09	National (Matsushita)		JR-200
Star Wars II	スターウォーズⅡ	JR-T34	National (Matsushita)	1982	JR-100
Super Dice	スーパーダイス	CE-2	Central Soft		JR-200
Swashbuckler (Compac)	スワッシュバックラー (Compac)		Compac		JR-200
Swashbuckler (Datamost)		JR-TU78	Datamost	1983	JR-200U
Thief			Panasonic		JR-200U
Three-Ball Drop	三ツ玉おとし	JR-T16	National (Matsushita)		JR-100
Trapit		JR-TU76	TMQ Software	1983	JR-200U
Tsume Shogi	詰め将棋	JR-TB21	National (Matsushita)		JR-200
Vortex (Compac)	ボルテックス (Compac)		Compac		JR-200
Vortex (Datamost)			Datamost	1983	JR-200U
Word Race			Datamost		JR-200U
Wordwatch		JR-TU20	Instant Software	1983	JR-200U

== See also ==
- JR-BASIC
- Panasonic JR-200
- Sharp MZ
- PC-8000 series
