= Thunder Force II =

1988 video game

- Developer: Technosoft
- Publishers: Technosoft; Genesis: JP: Technosoft; NA/EU: Sega
- Designer: Takashi Iwanaga
- Programmer: Izumi Fukuda
- Artists: Osamu Tsujikawa; Shinya Shirakawa
- Composer: Tomomi Ōtani
- Series: Thunder Force
- Platforms: X68000, Sega Genesis
- Release: X68000: JP: October 15, 1988; Genesis: JP: June 15, 1989; NA: August 1989; EU: November 1990
- Genre: Scrolling shooter
- Mode: Single-player

Thunder Force II (Note: Japanese: サンダーフォース II, Hepburn: Sandā Fōsu II) is a scrolling shooter developed by Technosoft. It was first released in Japan on October 15, 1988 for the X68000 computer. A year later, it was ported to the Sega Mega Drive/Genesis game console and released in Japan (under the name Thunder Force II MD), Europe, and the United States. Thunder Force II was one of the six launch titles for the U.S. Genesis release. The Genesis port was later included in Thunder Force Gold Pack Volume 1 for the Sega Saturn. It was also re-released via the Nintendo Classics service on December 16, 2021. It is the second chapter of the Thunder Force series.

== Gameplay ==

Top: "Top View" segment.
Bottom: "Side View" segment
(X68000 version showcased).

Stages in the game are now split into two formats: the free-directional scrolling, overhead stage format from the previous game (referred to as "top-view stages"), and horizontal forward-scrolling stages (referred to as "side-view" stages) which would become the series mainstay, dropping the former entirely. Each stage begins in the top-view perspective, where the player has to locate the cores of a certain number of major enemy bases and destroy them. After this is accomplished, the stage continues from the side-view perspective, which plays like a traditional horizontal scrolling shooter. After the boss of the side-view sub stage is defeated, the player moves on to the next stage.

Building upon its predecessor, Thunder Force II introduced a weapon system that would become the staple for the rest of the series. The player's ship now has default arsenal of weapons which include a twin, forward firing shot (the "Twin" shot), a single forward, and single backward firing shot (the "Back" shot), and a bomb shot in the top-view stages. By collecting certain items, the default weapons can be upgraded to more a powerful level. Also, the player could obtain a certain number of new weapons with various unique abilities by collecting the weapon's corresponding item (the "Hunter", a signature weapon of the series, debuts in this game). Once obtained, the weapons can be switched between at the player's desire, but if the ship is destroyed, all weapons are lost except for the defaults. The top-view and the side-view stages have different sets of weapons; losing weapons in the top-view stages do not affect the weapons equipped in the side-view stages and vice versa.

Thunder Force II also introduced the CRAW add-ons; small pods which revolve around the ship. The function of the CRAWs is to block weak incoming bullets, and to provide extra firepower by firing single, normal shots. The player may acquire up to two CRAWs at a time, but will lose them upon ship destruction. Exclusive to this game is an item which temporally increases their orbit speed, making them more likely to block bullets.

== Plot ==
Taking place soon after Thunder Force, the ORN Empire creates a powerful new battleship, the Plealos (a.k.a. Preareos). Using this battleship, ORN once again attacks the Galaxy Federation. The outcome of the attacks result in the destruction of the Galaxy Federation affiliated planet of Reda, and heavy destruction on the planet Nepura (a.k.a. Nebula), which ORN eventually captures from the Galaxy Federation.

Eventually, the Galaxy Federation learns that ORN houses Plealos deep below Nebula's surface when not in use and takes the opportunity to plan an operation to take it down. They send the next iteration of their Fire Leo series of fighter craft, the FIRE LEO-02 Exceliza, to destroy ORN bases on Nepura and eventually find and destroy Plealos. The player controls the Exceliza and travels through a variety of stages to accomplish this goal. The cover image for the Thunder Force II Sega/MD/G package by Illustrator Marc Ericksen describes the attack of the advanced FIRE LEO-02s on Nepura utilizing its forward and rear firing ordinance (above right).

== Reception ==
Reviews (Mega Drive)

Aggregate score
Aggregator	Score
GameRankings	72% (retrospective)

Review scores
Publication	Score
ACE	930/1000
Computer and Video Games	90%
Famitsu	28/40
Zero	93%
Computer Entertainer	8/8
Mean Machines	82%
MegaTech	81%

The Mega Drive version received generally favorable positive upon release. ACE magazine listed it in 1989 as one of the top three games available for the Mega Drive at the time, along with Altered Beast and Space Harrier II. Japanese magazine Famitsu gave the game a score of 28 out of 40. UK magazine Mean Machines gave it a positive review. MegaTech magazine reviewed the Sega Genesis version, praising the game as a "robust shoot-em up with plenty of thrills ‘n’ spills" and noting that the levels are "packed to the gills with enemy ships and huge end-of-level guardians" and recommending Thunder Force 2 to fans of that game genre. Hideki Sato, who designed the Sega Genesis hardware, singled out Thunder Force 2 as the game that first used more of the hardware's features, in contrast to Sega's 1988 output that led Sato to initially believe he had made a mistake when designing the console.
