= Thunder Force =

Video game series

- Genre: Horizontal-scrolling shooter
- Developers: Technosoft; Sega
- Publishers: Technosoft; Sega
- Creator: Kotori Yoshimura
- Platforms: Sharp X1, NEC PC-8801 mkII, FM-7, Sharp MZ 1500, NEC PC-6001 mkII, NEC PC-9801, X68000, Arcade, Sega Genesis, Super Nintendo Entertainment System, Sega Saturn, PlayStation, PlayStation 2
- First release: Thunder Force; December 1983
- Latest release: Thunder Force VI; October 30, 2008

Thunder Force (Note: Japanese: サンダーフォース, Hepburn: Sandā Fōsu) is a series of shooter video games developed by the Japanese software company Technosoft and published by Sega. The franchise is recognized for its distinctive gameplay, graphics, and synthesizer-based chiptune soundtracks.

There are six games in the series in total. The first appeared on the personal computers. The majority of installments in the series appeared on the Mega Drive console. The most recent entry was released on PlayStation 2.

== History ==
The series' first game, Thunder Force, appeared in 1983 on a variety of Japanese computers, such as the X1, PC-8801 mkII, and FM-7. Since Thunder Force II, the majority of installments in the series appeared on the Mega Drive console, where the series gained much of its popularity. The most recent entry was released on PlayStation 2.

The original Thunder Force video game was created by Kotori Yoshimura in 1983. She later left Technosoft and founded Arsys Software in 1985, where she and Osamu Nagano worked on notable titles such as Star Cruiser. In 1984, Technosoft released a level editor, or game creation system, titled Thunder Force Construction, created by Yoshimura for the FM-7 computer.

In September 2016, Sega announced at the Tokyo Game Show that they've acquired the rights to the Thunder Force franchise and all other Technosoft intellectual properties.

== Games ==
Year	Title	Original platform
1983	Thunder Force	Sharp X1
1988	Thunder Force II	X68000
1990	Thunder Force III	Mega Drive/Genesis
1992	Thunder Force IV	Mega Drive/Genesis
1997	Thunder Force V	Sega Saturn/Playstation
2008	Thunder Force VI	PlayStation 2

=== Compilations ===
Year	Title	Included games	Original platform
1996	Thunder Force Gold Pack 1	Thunder Force II; Thunder Force III	Sega Saturn
1996	Thunder Force Gold Pack 2	Thunder Force AC; Thunder Force IV	Sega Saturn
