= Thunder Force (video game) =

1983 video game

- X1 cover art
- Developer(s): Technosoft
- Publisher(s): Technosoft
- Designer(s): Kotori Yoshimura
- Platform(s): X1, PC-8801 mkII, FM-7, Sharp MZ-1500, PC-6001 mkII, PC-9801
- Release: X1: JP: December 1983; Sharp MZ-1500: JP: 1983; PC-8801: JP: January 1984 (V1); JP: March 1985 (V2); FM-7: JP: February 1984; PC-9801: JP: October 1984; PC-6001: JP: 1985
- Genre(s): Scrolling shooter
- Mode(s): Single-player

Thunder Force (サンダーフォース, Sandā Fōsu) is a multidirectional scrolling shooter released by Technosoft in 1983. It is the first game in the Thunder Force series. It was initially published for the X1 computer, then for the Sharp MZ-1500, PC-6001 mkII, and in 1985 on the PC-8801 mkII. In 1984, it was released for the FM-7 and PC-9801 computers as Thunder Force Construction, featuring an add-on that allowed players to create custom areas, like a level editor or game creation system.

== Gameplay ==
The structure of the game consists of overhead, free-directional scrolling areas and the player's ship is armed with main shot to shoot airborne targets and a bomb shot to shoot ground enemies. Gameplay consists of flying the FIRE LEO over ORN occupied areas while destroying enemy base installations and turrets. Each area has a certain number of shield generators hidden under the ground-based, enemy targets; in order for an area to be completed, the shield generators must be found and destroyed. After doing so, the Dyradeizer will temporally appear and the player must destroy a certain section of it. Once this section is destroyed, the Dyradeizer will disappear and the player will be taken to the next area to repeat the process.

== Plot ==
The ORN Empire (antagonists of the game) has built a large asteroid fortress named the Dyradeizer to oppose the Galaxy Federation. In addition to its high firepower capabilities, Dyradeizer is supported by shield generators hidden in various locations by ORN, which render the fortress invisible. In an attempt to destroy Dyradeizer, the Galaxy Federation sends their specially designed fighter, the FIRE LEO (controlled by the player), to locate and destroy the shield generators and defeat Dyradeizer.

== Development ==
The original Thunder Force was created by Kotori Yoshimura in 1983. She later left Technosoft and founded Arsys Software in 1985. In 1984, Technosoft released a level editor, or game creation system, entitled Thunder Force Construction, created by Yoshimura for the FM-7 computer.

== Legacy ==
The success of the game led to a number of sequels in the Thunder Force series.

== See also ==
- Raid on Bungeling Bay
- Time Pilot '84
