= Mega Drive Advanced Gaming =

British video game magazine

- #6, February 1993
- Editor: Hugh Gollner
- Categories: Video game magazines
- Frequency: Monthly
- First issue: September 1992
- Final issue: 1995
- Company: Maverick Magazines
- Country: United Kingdom
- Based in: Oxford
- Language: English
- ISSN: 0966-551X

Mega Drive Advanced Gaming was a magazine that focused on the Sega Mega Drive video game console, but would also cover the Mega-CD and 32X. Launched by Maverick Magazines around the same time as Future's MEGA in August 1992, with issue 1 cover dated as September 1992.

In 1995 the magazine ceased publication. Hugh Gollner, publisher and owner of Maverick Magazines, granted the magazine preservation project permission to scan, edit and release the back issues of Mega Drive Advanced Gaming.

Mega Drive Advanced Gaming was the launch-title for Maverick Magazines. Early on in its life, it was recognised by the Audit Bureau of Circulations as the best-selling Mega Drive magazine in the UK.
