= Thunder Force V =

1997 video game

- Sega Saturn cover art
- Developer: Technosoft
- Publishers: JP: Technosoft; NA: Working Designs
- Director: Naosuke Arai
- Programmer: Masaki Mutō
- Composer: Hyakutaro Tsukumo
- Series: Thunder Force
- Platforms: Sega Saturn, PlayStation
- Release: Sega Saturn: JP: July 11, 1997; PlayStation: JP: May 21, 1998; NA: November 13, 1998
- Genre: Horizontal-scrolling shooter
- Mode: Single-player

Thunder Force V (Note: Japanese: サンダーフォースＶ, Hepburn: Sandā Fōsu V) is a horizontal-scrolling shooter video game developed and published by Technosoft for the Sega Saturn. The game was released in 1997, with the PlayStation port Thunder Force V: Perfect System (Note: Japanese: サンダーフォースＶ パーフェクト システム, Hepburn: Sandā Fōsu V: Pāfekuto Shisutemu) released in 1998. It is the fifth installment in the Thunder Force series and the last one created by Technosoft. Unlike previous games in the series, Thunder Force V uses polygons to model the larger enemy ships and some of the scenery, in addition to sprites. The story revolves around a combat unit formed to fight against the Guardian supercomputer, which went rogue after deciphering the code of a space vessel. The player pilots a starfighter through a 2.5D perspective; the environments are rendered in three dimensions but the player moves in a 2D plane.

== Gameplay ==
The Gauntlet fighting an enemy in the second level

Thunder Force V is a horizontal-scrolling shooter video game. It is presented from a 2.5D perspective, with environments rendered in 3D and gameplay taking place on a 2D plane. The player controls a starship named the Gauntlet in its mission to destroy the Guardian, a supercomputer that became rogue after deciphering the code of a space vessel. There are seven levels total, and the first three can be selected in any order. Levels scroll automatically, and the player is given free movement. Its gameplay is similar to its predecessor, Thunder Force IV; players must destroy constantly-moving formations of enemies and dodge their projectiles and incoming obstacles. A boss concludes the end of a stage.

As in previous Thunder Force games, the player has a special weapon named the "CRAW" that emits additional firepower and absorbs enemy shots. Thunder Force V allows for up to three CRAWs to be used at a time instead of two like its predecessors, and the CRAWs will remain on the screen for a finite period of time that allows the player to recollect them. The CRAWs can also be combined with the player's currently-selected weapon to create a more powerful version of it called an "Over Weapon". Over Weapons can be used for a limited amount of time before they revert to their original state. Creating Over Weapons uses up the CRAW's energy, which is indicated by its change in color. Energy can be replenished by collecting additional CRAWs or by waiting for them to recharge.

== Development ==
Production on the fifth installment in the Thunder Force series began on the Sega Mega Drive. According to former Technosoft staff member Naosuke Arai, the team started by utilizing pre-rendered 3D graphics, but were unhappy with its cheap look compared to Thunder Force IV. Minimal work was done on this version before the developers decided that the Sega Saturn would be more capable of creating the visuals they desired.

== Release ==
Thunder Force V was released in Japan for the Sega Saturn on July 11, 1997. There were two retail versions, the normal pack, and a special pack which contained a remix music CD of various Thunder Force music entitled Best of Thunder Force, which was later released separately. The Saturn version was never released outside Japan. Sega Europe took a preproduction version under consideration, and decided against publishing the game. Electronic Gaming Monthly urged readers to tell Sega of America to release the game in the United States, but it was never released there either.

Thunder Force V was ported to the PlayStation and released in 1998 as Thunder Force V: Perfect System. It was published in North America by Working Designs under the SPAZ label. The PlayStation version features additional levels, high-resolution artwork, CG rendered movie sequences, and a time attack mode.

== Reception ==
Reception

Aggregate scores
| Aggregator | Score | |
| Aggregator | PS | Saturn |
|---|---|---|
| GameRankings | 74% | N/A |
| Metacritic | 70/100 | N/A |

Review scores
| Publication | Score | |
| Publication | PS | Saturn |
|---|---|---|
| AllGame | 3/5 | N/A |
| CNET Gamecenter | 7/10 | N/A |
| Computer and Video Games | N/A | 3/5 |
| Edge | 6/10 | N/A |
| Electronic Gaming Monthly | 7.5/10 | N/A |
| Famitsu | 31/40 | 28/40 |
| Game Informer | 6.5/10 | N/A |
| GameFan | N/A | 94% |
| GameSpot | 8.2/10 | 8/10 |
| IGN | 8.5/10 | N/A |
| Next Generation | 2/5 | N/A |
| Official U.S. PlayStation Magazine | 3.5/5 | N/A |
| Dengeki PlayStation | 75/100, 75/100, 80/100, 60/100 | N/A |
| Sega Saturn Magazine | N/A | 91% |

Reviewing the Saturn version as an import, the British Sega Saturn Magazine said that the combination of polygonal ships with 2D parallax scrolling backgrounds "looks a little bit ropey", but judged that the strong gameplay and enhanced powerups compared to previous Thunder Force games outweighed the graphical weaknesses.

The PlayStation version received "average" reviews according to the review aggregation website Metacritic. Next Generation said of the game, "If there is a saving grace here, then it is this: Thunderforce [sic] takes you back to a time when games weren't as good as they are now."

Retrospectively in 2007, Rob Fahey of Eurogamer said that while it wasn't nearly as refined or "utterly fantastic" as Einhänder or Radiant Silvergun, Thunder Force V was still a good shooter with well-implemented mechanics. Fahey particularly praised the CRAW for being the game's "hook", and also liked its level design and "perfectly-tuned" boss fights. He described it as being: "A very solid shooter, in other words, which deserved far more credit than it received - not least because any shooter with bosses called Deep Purple and Iron Maiden is alright in our book." In 2010, Hardcore Gaming 101's Paul Brownlee said that Thunder Force V had a great soundtrack and good gameplay, but was slightly hindered by visuals and 3D models that did not age well. He argued that one of the game's strong points was its boss fights for their cool-looking designs and accompanying music tracks, some of which are based on those from previous Thunder Force games. Brownlee compared the two versions of the game, and claimed that neither of them were better than the other; he said that while the Saturn version had more detailed backdrops and the PlayStation version had better textures, neither of them had good graphics in the long run.
