= Gemaga =

Japanese video game magazine

- Final issue cover (May 2012)
- Categories: Video games
- Publisher: SB Creative
- Founded: 1984
- Final issue: May 2012
- Country: Japan
- Language: Japanese

Gemaga (Note: Japanese: ゲーマガ, Hepburn: Gēmaga) was a Japanese video game magazine founded in 1984 as Beep and published by SB Creative. During its history, it was known variously as Beep, Beep! MegaDrive, (Note: Japanese: BEEP!メガドライブ, Hepburn: BEEP! Mega Doraibu) Sega Saturn Magazine, Dreamcast Magazine, Dorimaga, (Note: Japanese: ドリマガ, Hepburn: Dorimaga) and finally Gemaga. When it ended publication in May 2012, it was the longest-running Japanese game magazine.

== History ==
The magazine was started by Softbank Publishing in 1984 as a monthly publication under the name Beep to cover video games for home computers, arcade machines and gaming consoles. Its original layout was inspired by the men's magazine Popeye.

The original Beep magazine was discontinued on 8 March 1989. The editor-in-chief, Yoji Kawaguchi pitched a new format to SoftBank: two separate magazines, one which covers games for Sega Mega Drive, and one which is dedicated to the upcoming Super Nintendo Entertainment System. The publisher was more interested in Nintendo, since it was more popular in Japan than Sega, but agreed to start with the Mega Drive-themed publication because the new Nintendo console was delayed from its original launch date in 1989. The new publication was named Beep! Mega Drive. Kawaguchi decided to keep the original name Beep to emphasize the continuity between the publications. The magazine went from a monthly to a twice-monthly publication.

In 1995 coverage of Mega Drive was withdrawn in favour of the Sega Saturn. The magazine was renamed Sega Saturn Magazine. Kawaguchi decided to drop "Beep" from its name because according to him, it had served its purpose. The magazine became a weekly publication. In 1998 it was rebranded as Dreamcast Magazine and changed its focus from Saturn to Sega Dreamcast.

Sega discontinued the Dreamcast on March 31, 2001, but the magazine survived by rebranding itself again. The title was changed to its previously informal name Dorimaga (short for "Dreamcast Magazine") and became a multiplatform publication. In 2006 the magazine changed its name again, to Gemaga, which is short for "Games Magazine".

In January 2012, it was announced by the publisher that Gemaga was to close. The May 2012 issue was the last of the magazine. At the time of its closure it was the longest-running magazine devoted to videogames in Japan.
