= List of PC games (E) =

The following page is an alphabetical section from the list of PC games.

== E ==
Name	Developer	Publisher	Genre(s)	Operating system(s)	Date released
EA Sports FC 24	EA Vancouver, EA Romania	EA Sports]	Sports	Microsoft Windows	September 29, 2023
EA Sports FC 25	EA Vancouver, EA Romania	EA Sports	Sports	Microsoft Windows	September 27, 2024
EA Sports FC 26	EA Vancouver, EA Romania	EA Sports	Sports	Microsoft Windows	September 26, 2025
EA Sports PGA Tour	EA Tiburon	EA Sports	Sports	Microsoft Windows	April 7, 2023
EA Sports WRC	Codemasters	EA Sports	Racing	Microsoft Windows	November 3, 2023
Emperor: Battle for Dune	Intelligent Games, Westwood Studios	EA Games	Real-time strategy	Microsoft Windows	June 12, 2001
eFootball 2022	Konami	Konami	Sports	Microsoft Windows	September 30, 2021
eFootball PES 2020	PES Productions	Konami	Sports	Microsoft Windows	September 10, 2019
eFootball PES 2021 Season Update	PES Productions	Konami	Sports	Microsoft Windows	September 15, 2020
Elden Ring	FromSoftware Inc.	Bandai Namco Entertainment	Action role-playing game	Microsoft Windows	February 25, 2022
The Elder Scrolls: Arena	Bethesda Softworks	Bethesda Softworks	Action role-playing	MS-DOS	March 25, 1994
The Elder Scrolls Adventures: Redguard	Bethesda Softworks	Bethesda Softworks	Action role-playing	MS-DOS	November 14, 1998
The Elder Scrolls II: Daggerfall	Bethesda Softworks	Bethesda Softworks	Action role-playing	MS-DOS	August 31, 1996
The Elder Scrolls III: Morrowind	Bethesda Game Studios	Bethesda Softworks	Action role-playing	Microsoft Windows	May 1, 2002
The Elder Scrolls IV: Oblivion	Bethesda Game Studios, 4J Games, Superscape	Bethesda Softworks	Action role-playing	Microsoft Windows	March 20, 2006
The Elder Scrolls V: Skyrim	Bethesda Game Studios	Bethesda Softworks	Action role-playing	Microsoft Windows	November 11, 2011
The Elder Scrolls VI	Bethesda Game Studios	Bethesda Softworks	Action role-playing	Microsoft Windows	TBA
The Elder Scrolls Online	ZeniMax Online Studios	Bethesda Softworks	MMORPG	Microsoft Windows, Mac OS X	April 4, 2014
An Elder Scrolls Legend: Battlespire	Bethesda Softworks	Bethesda Softworks	Action role-playing	MS-DOS	November 30, 1997
Elder Sign: Omens	Fantasy Flight Games	Fantasy Flight Games	Adventure, board game	Microsoft Windows, macOS	October 31, 2011
Emily Wants to Play	Shawn Hitchcock	SKH Apps	Survival horror	Microsoft Windows, macOS	December 10, 2015
Empire: Total War	The Creative Assembly, Feral Interactive	Sega, Feral Interactive	RTS	Microsoft Windows, Linux, macOS	March 3, 2009
Empire Earth	Stainless Steel Studios	Sierra Entertainment	RTS	Microsoft Windows	November 12, 2001
Empire Earth II	Mad Doc Software	Vivendi Universal	RTS	Microsoft Windows	April 26, 2005
Empire Earth III	Mad Doc Software	Sierra Entertainment	RTS	Microsoft Windows	November 6, 2007
Empires Apart	Destiny Bit	Slitherine	RTS	Microsoft Windows	March 29, 2018
Enclave	Starbreeze Studios	Vivendi Universal, TopWare Interactive	Action	Microsoft Windows, Xbox	March 10, 2003
Endacopia	ANDY LAND	ANDY LAND	Point-and-click adventure	Microsoft Windows	July 27, 2026
Endless Space	Amplitude Studios	Iceberg Interactive	4X	Microsoft Windows, macOS	July 4, 2012
Epic Battle Fantasy	Matt Roszak	Kupo Games	Role-playing	Microsoft Windows, Linux, macOS	March 1, 2009
Epic Battle Fantasy 2	Matt Roszak	Kupo Games	Role-playing	Microsoft Windows, Linux, macOS	August 20, 2009
Epic Battle Fantasy 3	Matt Roszak	Kupo Games	Role-playing	Microsoft Windows, Linux, macOS	September 12, 2010
Epic Battle Fantasy 4	Matt Roszak	Kupo Games	Role-playing	Microsoft Windows, Linux, macOS	September 12, 2013
Euro Truck Simulator	SCS Software	SCS Software	Simulator	Microsoft Windows	August 29, 2008
Euro Truck Simulator 2	SCS Software	SCS Software	Simulator	Microsoft Windows, Linux, macOS	October 19, 2012
Europa Universalis	Paradox Development Studio	Strategy First	Grand strategy	Microsoft Windows	March 14, 2000
European Air War	MicroProse	MicroProse	Combat flight simulation	Microsoft Windows	November 3, 1998
Europa Universalis II	Paradox Development Studio	Strategy First, MacPlay, Typhoon Games	Grand strategy	Microsoft Windows, macOS	November 12, 2001
Europa Universalis III	Paradox Development Studio	Paradox Interactive	Grand strategy	Microsoft Windows	January 23, 2007
Europa Universalis IV	Paradox Development Studio	Paradox Interactive	Grand strategy	Microsoft Windows, Linux, macOS	August 13, 2013
Eve Online	CCP Games	CCP Games	Space flight simulator game, MMORPG	Microsoft Windows, macOS	May 6, 2003
Event 0	Ocelot Society	Ocelot Society	Adventure	Microsoft Windows, macOS	September 14, 2016
Eye of the Beholder	Strategic Simulations, Inc.	TSR, Inc.	Fantasy, RPG	MS-DOS	April 16, 1990
Eye of the Beholder II: The Legend of Darkmoon	Westwood Associates	Strategic Simulations, Inc.	Fantasy, RPG	MS-DOS	December 12, 1991
Eye of the Beholder III: Assault on Myth Drannor	Strategic Simulations, Inc.	Strategic Simulations, Inc.	Fantasy, RPG	MS-DOS	August 3, 1992
