= Mines of Titan =

1989 video game

- Developer: Westwood Associates
- Publisher: Infocom
- Platforms: Apple II, Commodore 64, MS-DOS
- Release: 1989
- Genre: Role-playing
- Mode: Single-player

Mines of Titan is a single-player role-playing video game, developed by Westwood Associates (later Westwood Studios), and published by Infocom in 1989 for Apple II, Commodore 64, and MS-DOS.

== Remake ==
Mines of Titan is a remake, or update, of the Commodore 64 game Mars Saga. Mines of Titan is lengthier, with some new storylines, a few more creatures and a colors are different. The game's location is moved from Mars to Titan and the cities and maps look the same.

== Plot ==
Mines of Titan is set in the year 2261, well into the era of mankind's colonization the inner Solar System. The game takes place on a barely terraformed Titan, the largest moon of the gas giant Saturn, at the edge of frontier space.

The player character is a charismatic 22-year-old astronaut Tom Jetland, who has crashed on Titan after bullet-sized rocks from the Rings of Saturn pierced his ship's hull. Forced to eject payload and has no means of transport off the world. In order to raise money, Jetland must search for, recruit, create and control a party of characters ready for exploration and combat. The player develops Jetland and other characters by improving their natural attributes and by adding and training in over twenty new skills which will aid in both the central quest and various side missions.

Success depends upon competence in battle with various creatures and human foes alike; exploration of underground colonies and mining settlements; using characters' skills to their best advantage; utilising a wide array of weaponry and aid acquired from merchants; and most importantly tracking down the clues to solve the mysteries of Titan. For only by uncovering a vast conspiracy and learning the fate of the disappeared Proscenium Colony (presumably named after the Proscenium "archway" of a theatrical stage) will the player be able to raise enough credits to pay for safe passage off Titan.

== Release ==
Infocom often released their games with merchandise referred to as feelies. Mines of Titan originally came on floppy disk format which was provided in a secret agent-style packaging, which also contained a thirty-seven page manual and various paraphernalia, such as a "command reference card"; supposedly secret classified military and scientific documents; weapons schematics; illustrations of alien lifeforms; and hidden maps, all connected with the game. The more expensive game packages had small figurines. These box sets are now extremely rare.

== Reception ==
The game was reviewed in 1990 in Dragon #154 by Hartley, Patricia, and Kirk Lesser in "The Role of Computers" column. The reviewers gave the game 5 out of 5 stars. In 2006, abandonware website Abandonia gave a negative review to the game, chiefly criticizing its battle system and lack of sound.

Jim Trunzo reviewed Mines of Titan in White Wolf #21 (June/July 1990), rating it a 4 out of 5 and stated that "Mines of Titan not only challenges the gamer intellectually but also excites him visually."
