= Real-time strategy game =

Strategy video game sub-genre

A real-time strategy (RTS) game is a subgenre of strategy video games where players manage resources and command units to achieve objectives continuously in real time, rather than taking turns. By contrast, in turn-based strategy (TBS) games, players take turns to play. The term "real-time strategy" was coined by Brett Sperry to market Dune II in the early 1990s.

In classic real-time strategy games, each participant positions structures and maneuvers multiple units under their indirect control to secure areas of the map and destroy their opponents' assets. In a typical RTS game, it is possible to create additional units and structures generally limited by a requirement to expend accumulated resources. These resources are in turn garnered by controlling special points on the map or possessing certain types of units and structures devoted to this purpose. More specifically, the typical game in the RTS genre features resource-gathering, base-building, in-game technological development, and indirect control of units.

The tasks a player must perform to win an RTS game can be very demanding, and complex user interfaces have evolved for them. Some features have been borrowed from desktop environments; for example, the technique of "clicking and dragging" to create a box that selects all units under a given area. Though some video game genres share conceptual and gameplay similarities with the RTS template, recognized genres are generally not subsumed as RTS games. For instance, city-building games, construction and management simulations, and games of real-time tactics are generally not considered real-time strategy per se. This would only apply to anything considered a god game, where the player assumes a god-like role of creation.

== History ==
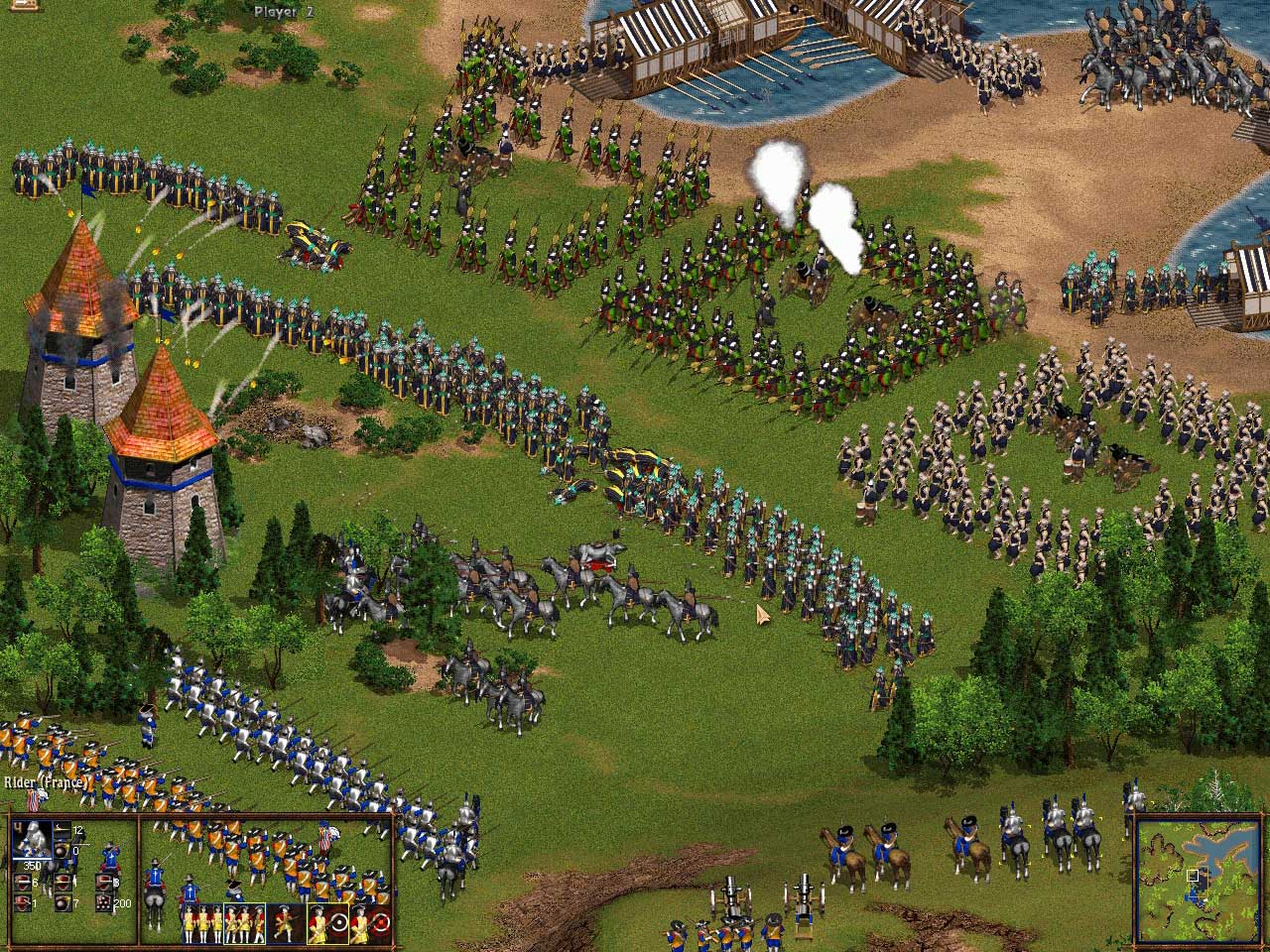
Armies clashing in the real-time strategy game Cossacks: European Wars

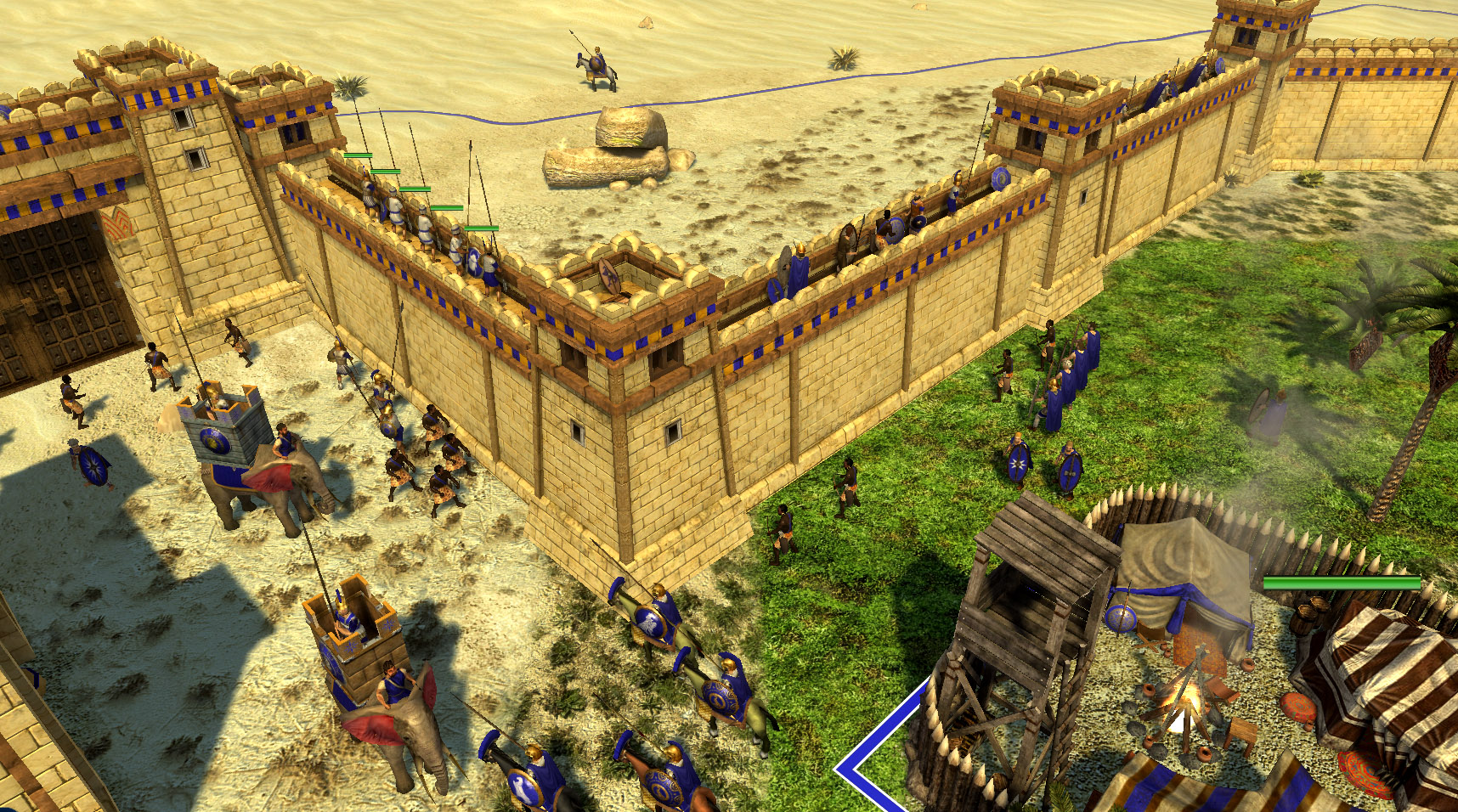
Games in the genre can feature defensive structures, such as these city walls in 0 A.D.

=== Origins ===
The genre recognized today as "real-time strategy" emerged from an extended period of evolution and refinement. Games sometimes perceived as ancestors of the real-time strategy genre were never marketed or designed as such. As a result, designating "early real-time strategy" titles is problematic because such games are being held up to modern standards. The genre initially evolved separately in the United Kingdom, Japan, and North America, afterward gradually merging into a unified worldwide tradition.

Tim Barry in May 1981 described in InfoWorld a multiplayer strategy space game with "real-time response" that ran on an IBM System/370 Model 168 at a large San Francisco Bay Area company. Ars Technica traces the genre's roots back to Utopia (1982), citing it as the "birth of a genre", with a "real-time element" that was "virtually unheard of", thus making it "arguably the earliest ancestor of the real-time strategy genre". According to Ars Technica, Utopia was a turn-based strategy game with hybrid elements that ran "in real-time but events happened on a regular turn-based cycle." According to Brett Weiss, Utopia is often cited as "the first real-time strategy game." According to Matt Barton and Bill Loguidice, Utopia "helped set the template" for the genre, but has "more in common with SimCity than it does with Dune II and later RTS games." Barton also cites Cytron Masters (1982), saying it was "one of the first (if not the first [emphasis in the original]) real-time strategy game." On the other hand, Scott Sharkey of 1UP argues that, while Cytron Masters "attempted real time strategy", it was "much more tactical than strategic" due to "the inability to construct units or manage resources". Byte in December 1982 published as an Apple II type-in program Cosmic Conquest. The winner of the magazine's annual Game Contest, the author described it as a "single-player game of real-time action and strategic decision making". The magazine described it as "a real-time space strategy game". The game has elements of resource management and wargaming.

In the United Kingdom, the earliest real-time strategy games are Stonkers by John Gibson, published in 1983 by Imagine Software for the ZX Spectrum, and Nether Earth for ZX Spectrum in 1987. In North America, the oldest game retrospectively classified as real-time strategy by several sources is The Ancient Art of War (1984), designed by Dave and Barry Murry of Evryware, followed by The Ancient Art of War at Sea in 1987.

In Japan, the earliest is Bokosuka Wars (1983), an early strategy RPG (or "simulation RPG"); the game revolves around the player leading an army across a battlefield against enemy forces in real-time while recruiting/spawning soldiers along the way, for which it is considered by Ray Barnholt of 1UP to be an early prototype real-time strategy game. Another early title with real-time strategy elements is Sega's Gain Ground (1988), a strategy-action game that involved directing a set of troops across various enemy-filled levels. TechnoSoft's Herzog (1988) is regarded as a precursor to the real-time strategy genre, being the predecessor to Herzog Zwei and somewhat similar in nature, though primitive in comparison.

IGN cites Herzog Zwei, released for the Sega Mega Drive/Genesis in 1989 as "arguably the first RTS game ever", and it is often cited as "the first real-time strategy game" according to Ars Technica. It combines traditional strategy gameplay with fully real-time, fast-paced, arcade-style action gameplay, featuring a split-screen two-player mode where both players are in action simultaneously and there are no pauses while decisions are taken, forcing players to think quickly while on the move. In Herzog Zwei, though the player only controls one unit, the manner of control foreshadowed the point-and-click mechanic of later games. Scott Sharkey of 1UP argues that it introduced much of the genre conventions, including unit construction and resource management, with the control and destruction of bases being an important aspect of the game, as were the economic/production aspects of those bases. Herzog Zwei is credited by 1UP as a landmark that defined the genre and as "the progenitor of all modern real-time strategy games." Chuck Sperry cited Herzog Zwei as an influence on Dune II.

Notable as well are early games like Mega-Lo-Mania by Sensible Software (1991) and Supremacy (also called Overlord – 1990). Although these two lacked direct control of military units, they both offered considerable control of resource management and economic systems. In addition, Mega Lo Mania has advanced technology trees that determine offensive and defensive prowess. Another early game, Carrier Command (1988) by Realtime Games, involved real-time responses to events in the game, requiring management of resources and control of vehicles. Another early game, SimAnt (1991) by Maxis, had resource gathering, and controlling an attacking army by having them follow a lead unit. However, it was with the release of Dune II (1992) from Westwood Studios that real-time strategy became recognized as a distinct genre of video games.

=== 1992–1998: Seminal titles ===
Although real-time strategy games have an extensive history, some titles have served to define the popular perception of the genre and expectations of the genre more than others, in particular the games released between 1992 and 1998 by Westwood Studios and Blizzard Entertainment.

Drawing influence from Herzog Zwei, Populous, Eye of the Beholder, and the Macintosh user interface, Westwood's Dune II: The Building of a Dynasty (1992) featured all the core concepts and mechanics of modern real-time strategy games that are still used today, such as using the mouse to move units and gathering resources, and as such served as the prototype for later real-time strategy games. According to its co-designer and lead programmer, Joe Bostic, a "benefit over Herzog Zwei is that we had the advantage of a mouse and keyboard. This greatly facilitated precise player control, which enabled the player to give orders to individual units. The mouse, and the direct control it allowed, was critical in making the RTS genre possible."

The success of Dune II encouraged several games that became influential in their own right. Warcraft: Orcs & Humans (1994) achieved great prominence upon its release, owing in part to its use of a fantasy setting and also to its depiction of a wide variety of buildings (such as farms) which approximated a full fictitious society and not just a military force. Command & Conquer (1995), as well as Command & Conquer: Red Alert (1996), became the most popular early RTS games. These two games contended with Warcraft II: Tides of Darkness after its release in late 1995.

Following the success of titles such as Command & Conquer and WarCraft II, a large number of competing real-time strategy titles were announced by other publishers, with Computer Gaming World observing many announcements of strategy titles at E3 in 1997, and 40 titles marketed during the 1997 Christmas holiday season.

Total Annihilation, released by Cavedog Entertainment in 1997, introduced 3D units and terrain and focused on huge battles that emphasized macromanagement over micromanagement. It featured a streamlined interface that would influence many RTS games in later years. Age of Empires, released by Ensemble Studios in 1997, tried to put a game in a slower pace, combining elements of Civilization with the real-time strategy concept by introducing ages of technologies. In 1998, Blizzard released the game StarCraft, which became an international phenomenon and is still played in large professional leagues to this day. Collectively, all of these games defined the genre, providing the de facto benchmark against which new real-time strategy games are measured.

=== 1995–2003: Refinement and transition to 3D ===
The real-time strategy genre has been relatively stable since 1995. Additions to the genre's concept in newer games tend to emphasize more of the basic RTS elements (higher unit caps, more unit types, larger maps, etc.). Rather than innovations to the game concept, new games generally focus on refining aspects of successful predecessors. Cavedog's Total Annihilation from 1997 introduced the first 3D units and terrain in real-time strategy games. The Age of Empires focus on historical setting and age advancement was refined further by its sequel, Age of Empires II: Age of Kings, and by Stainless Steel Studios' Empire Earth in 2001. GSC Game World's Cossacks series brought population caps into the tens of thousands.

Dungeon Keeper (1997), Populous: The Beginning (1998), Jeff Wayne's The War of the Worlds (1998), Warzone 2100 (1999), Machines (1999), Homeworld (1999), and Dark Reign 2 (2000) were among the first completely 3D real-time strategy titles. Homeworld featured a 3D environment in space, therefore allowing movement in every direction, a feature which its semi-sequel, Homeworld Cataclysm (2000) continued to build upon adding features such as waypoints. Homeworld 2, released in 2003, streamlined movement in the 360° 3D environment. Furthermore, Machines, which was also released in 1999 and featured a nearly 100% 3D environment, attempted to combine the RTS genre with a first-person shooter (FPS) genre although it was not a particularly successful title. These games were followed by a short period of interest in experimental strategy games such as Allegiance (2000). Jeff Wayne's The War of the Worlds was notable for being one of the few completely non-linear RTS games ever.

It is only in approximately 2002 that 3D real-time strategy became the standard, with both Warcraft III (2002) and Ensemble Studio's Age of Mythology (2002) being built on a full 3D game engine. Kohan: Immortal Sovereigns introduced classic wargame elements, such as supply lines to the genre. Battle Realms (2001) was another full 3D game, but had limited camera views.

The move from 2D to 3D has been criticized in some cases. Issues with controlling the camera and placement of objects have been cited as problems.

=== 2004–2012: Specialization and evolution ===
A few games have experimented with diversifying map design, which continues to be largely two-dimensional even in 3D engines. Earth 2150 (2000) allowed units to tunnel underground, effectively creating a dual-layer map; three-layer (orbit-surface-underground) maps were introduced in Metal Fatigue. In addition, units could even be transported to entirely separate maps, with each map having its own window in the user interface. Three Kingdoms: Fate of the Dragon (2001) offered a simpler model: the main map contains locations that expand into their own maps. In these examples, however, the gameplay was essentially identical regardless of the map layer in question. Dragonshard (2005) emphasized its dual-layer maps by placing one of the game's two main resources in each map, making exploration and control of both maps fundamentally valuable.

Relatively few genres have emerged from or in competition with real-time strategy games, although real-time tactics (RTT), a superficially similar genre, emerged around 1995. In 1998, Activision attempted to combine the real-time strategy and first-person shooter genres in Battlezone (1998), while in 2002 Rage Games Limited attempted this with the Hostile Waters games. Later variants have included Natural Selection (2002), a game modification based on the Half-Life engine, and the free software Tremulous/Unvanquished. Savage: The Battle for Newerth (2003) combined the RPG and RTS elements in an online game.

Some games, borrowing from the real-time tactics (RTT) template, have moved toward an increased focus on tactics while downplaying traditional resource management, in which designated units collect the resources used for producing further units or buildings. Titles like Warhammer 40,000: Dawn of War (2004), Star Wars: Empire at War (2006), and Company of Heroes (2006) replace the traditional resource gathering model with a strategic control-point system, in which control over strategic points yields construction/reinforcement points. Ground Control (2000) was the first such game to replace individual units with "squads".

Others are moving away from the traditional real-time strategy game model with the addition of other genre elements. One example is Sins of a Solar Empire (2008), released by Ironclad Games, which mixes elements of grand-scale stellar empire building games like Master of Orion with real-time strategy elements. Another example is indie game Achron (2011), which incorporates time travel as a game mechanic, allowing a player to send units forward or backward in time.

Multiplayer online battle arena games (MOBA) have originated as a subgenre of real-time strategy games, however this fusion of real-time strategy, role-playing, and action games has lost many traditional RTS elements. These types of games moved away from constructing additional structures, base management, army building, and controlling additional units. Map and the main structures for each team are still present, and destroying enemy main structure will secure victory as the ultimate victory condition. Unlike in RTS, a player has control over the only one single powerful unit, called "hero" or "champion", who advances in level, learns new abilities, and grows in power over the course of a match. Players can find various friendly and enemy units on the map at any given time assisting each team, however, these units are computer-controlled and players usually don't have direct control over their movement and creation; instead, they march forward along set paths. Defense of the Ancients (DotA), a Warcraft III mod from 2003, and its standalone sequel Dota 2 (2013), as well as League of Legends (2009), and Heroes of the Storm (2015), are the typical representatives of the new strategy subgenre. Former game journalist Luke Smith called DotA "the ultimate RTS".

=== 2012–present: Expansion and adaptation to various gaming formats ===
The popularization of the smartphone in the 2010s led to a new market for video games to expand to and develop. Innovation on the traditional RTS format accelerated throughout the early 2010s as RTS games were released for mobile devices. With a new format specific to mobile devices, mobile RTS games were often simpler than their desktop counterparts. The simplification of the RTS formula coupled with the adoption of the smartphone during this period allowed for mobile RTS games to be more accessible than traditional RTS games. Clash of Clans (2012), a mobile game published by Supercell, is a good example of a game which modified the RTS format into a simpler mobile experience. While often classified in the broader Strategy game genre, Clash of Clans still possesses many of the classic RTS elements, such as a "perspective of god", control over buildings and mobile units, and resource management. It also introduces and simplifies specific elements of an RTS to fit the mobile format with "idle" resource gathering and defenses, as well as reducing the number of resource types, unit types, and building types to make the game more accessible to new users. In an interview between game journalist Bryant Francis and Clash of Clans developer Stuart McGaw, McGaw attributed Clash of Clan's design to "a focus on simplicity and accessibility", something that "anyone could pick up and play", while also retaining "the strategy DNA", that gives players "lots of options" while remaining "clear to understand". Multiple other mobile games, such as Boom Beach (2014), Plague Inc. (2012), the Bloons Tower Defense series (2007-2021), and more have (varyingly) adapted the RTS format in the same manner as Clash of Clans, and in turn developed a style of RTS unique to the mobile game industry.

Beginning in the early-mid 2010s, the expansion of the Indie game market on game developer Valve Corporation's gaming distribution service, Steam, allowed RTS game developers to produce smaller-scale and increasingly accessible Indie-RTS games. These RTS games often are more true to the traditional RTS formula, with the player having the "perspective of god" and managing units and resources. Such Indie-RTS Games released in this period were often subject to Porting, and often made it to mobile devices. A few of these Indie-RTS games are Ultimate Epic Battle Simulator (2017), the Machines at War series (2007-2012), and Bad North (2018).

Oftentimes, modern RTS games attempt to capture the "nostalgia" of classic RTS games. Rusted Warfare (2017), is an indie-mobile release which is a good example of a traditional-style RTS which utilizes assets from the unreleased Hard Vacuum (1993) to create a "revived" RTS experience. Hard Vacuum was intended to include "resource gathering from mineral deposits", "base building", and "a wide range of fighting with units". Rusted Warfare and other traditional RTS titles utilized the element of classic PC-gaming nostalgia in order to drive the game-playing experience.

Traditional RTS games released in the late 2010s - early 2020s were developed with a focus on coupling the traditional-style gameplay with uniquely styled, or hyper-realistic graphics. These RTS games are often Indie-RTS games, but released on a multitude of platforms. Some RTS releases like Halo Wars 2 (2017), Steel Division 2 (2019), Company of Heroes 3 (2023), and Last Train Home (2023) are examples of modern RTS games that are focused on providing a traditional RTS experience.

== Gameplay ==
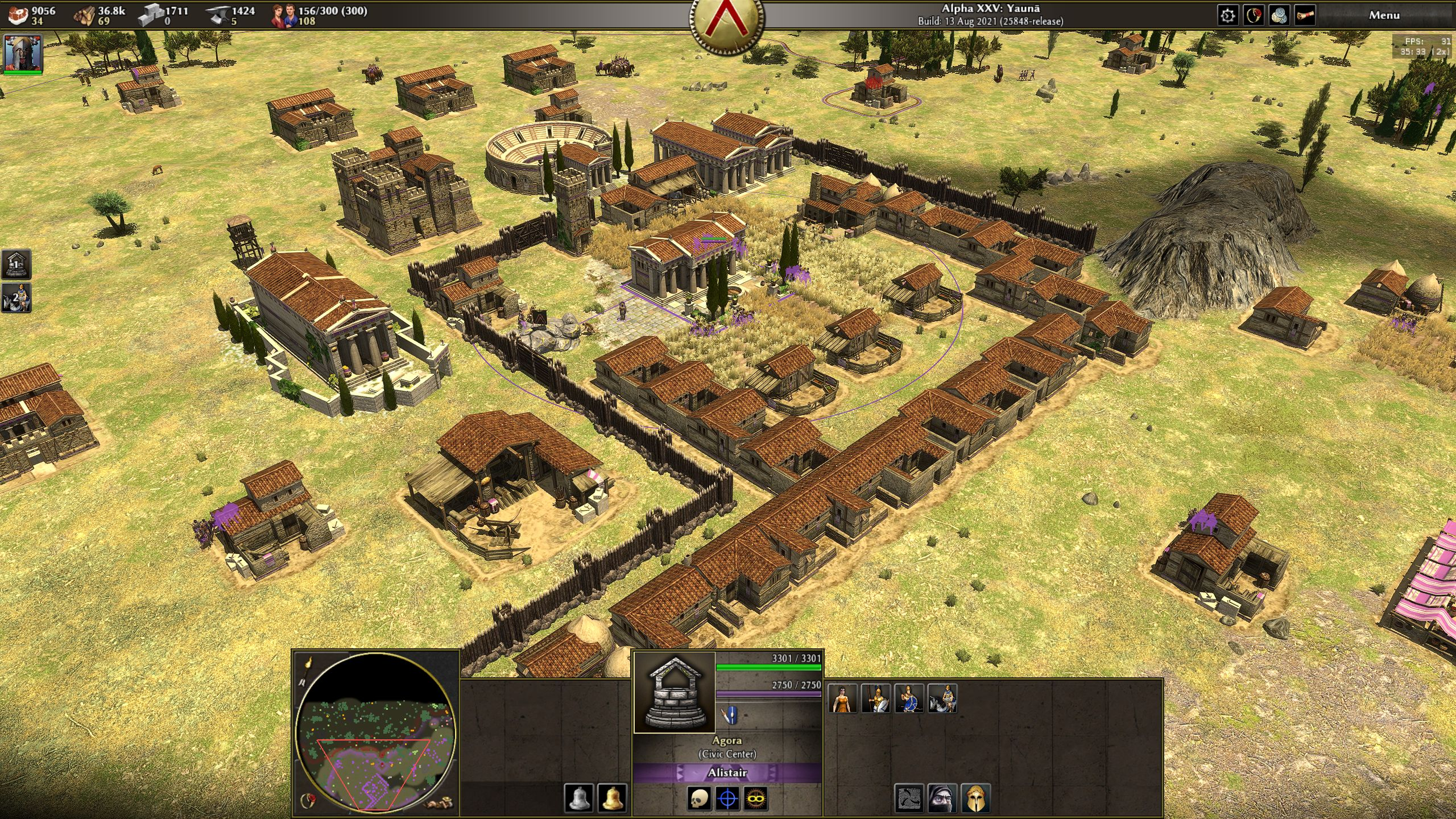
Screenshot from the game 0 A.D., showing typical RTS interface elements such as a resource overview (top left), a map of the game world (bottom left), and a description of the selected unit (bottom center)

In a typical real-time strategy game, the screen is divided into a map area displaying the game world and terrain, units, and buildings, and an interface overlay containing command and production controls and often a "radar" or "minimap" overview of the entire map. The player is usually given an isometric perspective of the world, or a free-roaming camera from an aerial viewpoint for modern 3D games. Players mainly scroll the screen and issue commands with the mouse, and may also use keyboard shortcuts.

Gameplay generally consists of the player being positioned somewhere in the map with a few units or a building that is capable of building other units/buildings. Often, but not always, the player must build specific structures to unlock more advanced units in the tech tree. Often, but not always, RTS games require the player to build an army (ranging from small squads of no more than two units to literally hundreds of units) and using them to either defend themselves from a virtual form of Human wave attack or to eliminate enemies who possess bases with unit production capacities of their own. Occasionally, RTS games will have a preset number of units for the player to control and do not allow building of additional ones.

Resource gathering is commonly the main focus of the RTS games, but other titles of the genre place higher gameplay significance to how units are used in combat (Z: Steel Soldiers for example, awards credits for territory captured rather than gathered resources), the extreme example of which are games of the real-time tactical genre. Some titles impose a ceiling on the number simultaneous troops, which becomes a key gameplay consideration, a significant example being StarCraft, while other titles have no such unit cap.

=== Micromanagement and macromanagement ===
Micromanagement deals with a player's constant need to manage and maintain individual units (which include troops, Magic, spells, Heros) and resources (Gold, Diamonds, Gems) on a fine scale. On the other hand, macromanagement refers to a player's management of economic expansion and large-scale strategic maneuvering, allowing the player time to think and consider possible solutions. Micromanagement involves the use of combat tactics involved in the present, whereas macromanagement considers the greater scale of the game in an attempt to predict the future.

=== Criticism of gameplay ===
==== Turn-based vs. real-time ====
A debate has emerged between fans of real-time strategy (RTS) and turn-based strategy (TBS) (and related genres) based on the merits of the real-time and turn-based systems. In the past, a common criticism was to regard real-time strategy games as "cheap imitations" of turn-based strategy games, arguing that real-time strategy games had a tendency to devolve into "click-fests" in which the player who was faster with the mouse generally won, because they could give orders to their units at a faster rate.

The common retort is that success involves not just fast clicking, but also the ability to make sound decisions under time pressure. The "clickfest" argument is also often voiced alongside a "button babysitting" criticism, which pointed out that a great deal of game time is spent either waiting and watching for the next time a production button could be clicked, or rapidly alternating between different units and buildings, clicking their respective button.

Some titles attempt to merge the two systems: for example, the role-playing game Fallout uses turn-based combat and real-time gameplay, while the real-time strategy games Homeworld, Rise of Nations, and the games of the Total War and Hegemony series allow the player to pause the game and issue orders. Additionally, the Total War series has a combination of a turn-based strategy map with a real-time battle map. Another example of a game combining both turn-based game and real-time-strategy is The Lord of the Rings: The Battle for Middle-Earth II which allows players, in a 'War of the Ring' game, to play a turn-based strategy game, but also battle each other in real time.

==== Tactics vs. strategy ====
A second criticism of the RTS genre is the importance of skill over strategy. The manual dexterity and ability to multitask and divide one's attention is often considered the most important aspect to succeeding at the RTS genre. According to Troy Dunniway, former Westwood developer who has also worked on Command and Conquer 3: Tiberium Wars: "A player controls hundreds of units, dozens of buildings and many different events that are all happening simultaneously. There is only one player, and he can only pay attention to one thing at a time. Expert players can quickly flip between many different tasks, while casual gamers have more problems with this."

Real-time strategy games have been criticized for an overabundance of tactical considerations relative to strategic gameplay. According to Chris Taylor, lead designer of Supreme Commander: "[My first attempt at visualizing RTSs in a fresh and interesting new way] was my realizing that although we call this genre 'Real-Time Strategy,' it should have been called 'Real-Time Tactics' with a dash of strategy thrown in." (Taylor then posits his own game as having surpassed this mold by including additional elements of broader strategic scope.)

In general terms, military strategy refers to the use of a broad arsenal of weapons including diplomatic, informational, military, and economic resources, whereas military tactics is more concerned with short-term goals such as winning an individual battle. In the context of strategy video games, however, the difference is often reduced to the more limited criteria of either a presence or absence of base building and unit production.

In an article for Gamasutra, Nathan Toronto criticizes real-time strategy games for too often having only one valid means of victory — attrition — comparing them unfavorably to real-time tactics games. Players' awareness that the only way for them to win or lose is militarily makes them unlikely to respond to gestures of diplomacy. The result is that the winner of a real-time strategy game is too often the best tactician rather than the best strategist. Troy Goodfellow counters this by saying that the problem is not that real-time strategy games are lacking in strategy (he says attrition is a form of strategy), rather it is that they too often have the same strategy: produce faster than you consume. He also states that building and managing armies is the conventional definition of real-time strategy, and that it is unfair to make comparisons with other genres.

In an article for GameSpy, Mark Walker criticizes real-time strategy games for their lack of combat tactics, suggesting real-time tactics games as a more suitable substitute. He also says that developers need to begin looking outside the genre for new ideas in order for strategy games to continue to be successful in the future.

This criticism has ushered into a couple of hybrid designs that try to resolve the issues. The games of the Total War series have a combination of a (turn-based) strategy map with a (real-time) battle map, allowing the player to concentrate on one or the other. The games of the Hegemony series also combine a strategy map and a battle map (in full real-time) and the player can at any point in time seamlessly zoom in and out in between both.

==== Rushing vs. planning ====
A third common criticism is that real-time gameplay often degenerates into "rushes" where the players try to gain the advantage and subsequently defeat the opponent as quickly in the game as possible, preferably before the opposition is capable of successfully reacting. For example, the original Command & Conquer gave birth to the "tank rush" tactic, where the game outcome is often decided very early on by one player gaining an initial advantage in resources and producing large amounts of a relatively powerful but still quite cheap unit—which is thrown at the opposition before they have had time to establish defenses or production. Although this strategy has been criticized for encouraging overwhelming force over strategy and tactics, defenders of the strategy argue that they are simply taking advantage of the game's systems, and some argue that it is a realistic analog of warfare. One of the most notable types of rush is the "Zergling rush" in StarCraft, where the Zerg player would use all their resources to mass-produce Zerglings (a cheap but weak melee unit), and then send their entire force to attack as soon as possible. The strategy is risky: if the rush is destroyed, the attacking player is left with no army and an underdeveloped economy. The term "zerging" has become synonymous with rushing.

Some games have since introduced designs that do not easily lend themselves to rushes. For example, the Hegemony series made supply and (seasonal) resource management an integral part of its gameplay, thus limiting rapid expansion.

=== On consoles ===
Despite Herzog Zwei, a console game, laying the foundations for the real-time strategy genre, RTS games never gained popularity on consoles like they did on the PC platform. Real-time strategy games made for video game consoles have been consistently criticized due to their control schemes, as the PC's keyboard and mouse are considered to be superior to a console's gamepad for the genre. Thus, RTS games for home consoles have been met with mixed success. Scott Sharkey of 1UP notes that Herzog Zwei had already "offered a nearly perfect solution to the problem by giving the player direct control of a single powerful unit and near autonomy for everything else," and is surprised "that more console RTS games aren't designed with this kind of interface in mind from the ground up, rather than imitating" PC control schemes "that just doesn't work very well with a controller". Some handheld consoles like Napoleon on the GBA uses a similar solution.

However, several console titles in the genre received positive reception. The Pikmin series, which began in 2001 for the GameCube, became a million-seller. Similarly, Halo Wars, which was released in 2009 for the Xbox 360, generated generally positive reviews, achieved an 82% critic average on aggregate web sites, and sold over 1 million copies. According to IGN, the gameplay lacks the traditional RTS concepts of limited resources and resource gathering and lacks multiple buildings.

== Graphics ==
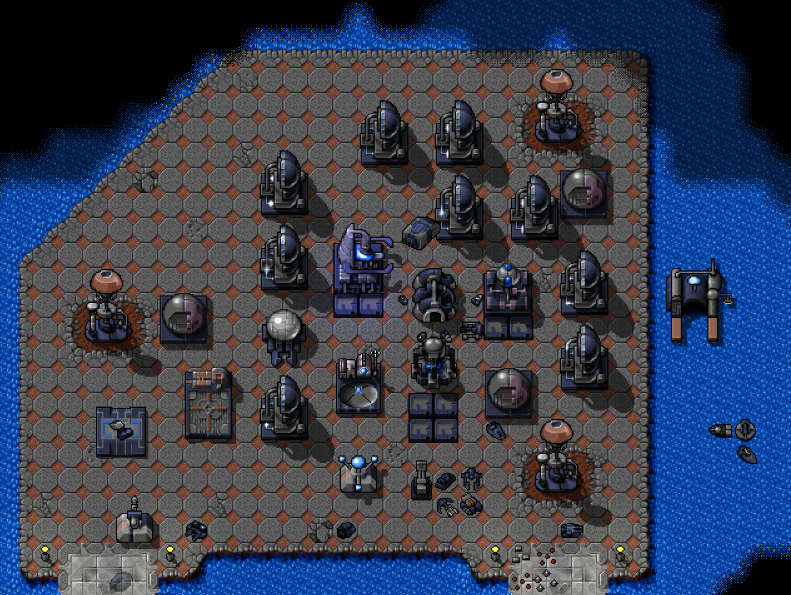
The OpenHV project uses 8-bit pixel art graphics.

Total Annihilation (1997) was the first real-time strategy game to utilize true 3D units, terrain, and physics in both rendering and in gameplay. For instance, the missiles in Total Annihilation travel in real time in simulated 3D space, and they can miss their target by passing over or under it. Similarly, missile-armed units in Earth 2150 are at a serious disadvantage when the opponent is on high ground because the missiles often hit the cliffside, even in the case when the attacker is a missile-armed helicopter. Homeworld, Warzone 2100 and Machines (all released in 1999) advanced the use of fully 3D environments in real-time strategy titles. In the case of Homeworld, the game is set in space, offering a uniquely exploitable 3D environment in which all units can move vertically in addition to the horizontal plane. However, the near-industry-wide switch to full 3D was very gradual and most real-time strategy titles, including the first sequels to Command & Conquer, initially used isometric 3D graphics made by pre-rendered 3D tiles. Only in later years did these games begin to use true 3D graphics and gameplay, making it possible to rotate the view of the battlefield in real-time. Spring is a good example of the transformation from semi-3D to full-3D game simulations. It is an open-source project, which aims to give a Total Annihilation game-play experience in three dimensions. The most ambitious use of full 3D graphics was realized in Supreme Commander, where all projectiles, units and terrain were simulated in real time, taking full advantage of the UI's zoom feature, which allowed cartographic style navigation of the 3D environment. This led to a number of unique gameplay elements, which were mostly obscured by the lack of computing power available in 2007, at the release date.

Japanese game developers Nippon Ichi and Vanillaware worked together on Grim Grimoire, a PlayStation 2 title released in 2007, which features hand-drawn animated 2D graphics.

From 2010, real-time strategy games more commonly incorporated physics engines, such as Havok, in order to increase realism experienced in gameplay. A modern real-time strategy game that uses a physics engine is Ensemble Studios' Age of Empires III, released on October 18, 2005, which used the Havok Game Dynamics SDK to power its real-time physics. Company of Heroes is another real-time strategy game that uses realistically modeled physics as a part of gameplay, including fully destructible environments.

== Tournaments ==
RTS World tournaments have been held for both StarCraft and Warcraft III since their 1998 and 2002 releases. The games have been so successful that some players have earned over $200,000 at the Warcraft III World Championships. In addition, hundreds of StarCraft II tournaments are held yearly, as it is becoming an increasingly popular branch of e-sports. Notable tournaments include MLG, GSL, and Dreamhack. RTS tournaments are especially popular in South Korea.

== See also ==
- List of real-time strategy video games
