= Lands of Lore: The Throne of Chaos =

1993 video game

- Developer: Westwood Studios
- Publisher: Virgin Games
- Producer: Rick Gush
- Designer: William Alan Crum
- Programmer: Philip W. Gorrow
- Artist: Rick Parks
- Composers: Paul Mudra; Frank Klepacki; Dwight Okahara
- Platforms: MS-DOS, FM Towns, PC-98
- Release: September 1993
- Genres: Role-playing, dungeon crawl
- Mode: Single-player

Lands of Lore: The Throne of Chaos is a 1993 role-playing video game developed by Westwood Studios and published by Virgin Games for MS-DOS, PC-98, and FM Towns. It is the first installment of the Lands of Lore series. The player travels around various environments, collecting items and battling monsters in an attempt to save the kingdom from a witch named Scotia, who has acquired shape-shifting abilities.

Westwood wanted to create something new after being acquired by Virgin, and it was intended that the game outperform Eye of The Beholder II. Lands of Lore: The Throne of Chaos received generally positive reviews, with reviewers complimenting the graphics and the skill system, but some criticized its combat and repetitiveness. In 1994, the game was re-released on CD, adding voice-overs, including some by Patrick Stewart. Lands of Lore: The Throne of Chaos was followed by a sequel, Lands of Lore: Guardians of Destiny, in 1997.

== Gameplay ==
A typical scenario in which the party is engaging in combat.

The game is a dungeon crawler, presented in a real-time, three-dimensional view from the character's perspective similar to the interface used on the Dungeon Master game and the Eye of the Beholder series. The player can move around and interact with the world by performing actions such as picking up items, throwing them, and using them on objects. Features such as locks and switches (which affect the world by triggering events such as walls appearing or disappearing) are abundant, and the latter can be interacted with directly. The player can obtain a map showing the player's current location, as well as important points on the level.

The player can play as one of four characters, each of which have their own statistics and specialize in certain areas. The characters' main statistics are might and protection, which affect the damage dealt and absorbed, respectively. The player can equip characters with items such as weapons and armor, which affect these statistics. Some weapons have special properties, such as having a chance to deal extra damage or kill enemies straight away. Not all special properties are favorable: for example, there is a bow that never hits anything. Other items that can be collected and placed in an inventory include medicine, keys, and rings that grant the wearer benefits such as increased health regeneration. Characters also have Fighter, Rogue, and Mage skills. Fighter affects the character's ability to engage in combat, Rogue affects their ability to use bows and pick locks, and Mage affects their ability to cast spells. Spells include fireballs, lightning, and healing characters, each having four power levels. Performing these actions increases the character's ability to do so. Characters join and leave the party throughout the game.

Throughout the game, the player will encounter and engage in combat with various monsters. Weapons and magic can be used to attack enemies. Some monsters can poison (which drains the character's health) or stun (rendering the character temporarily unable to do anything) party members. Medicines can be used to heal party members, and the party can rest at any time (although the party can be woken by monsters), regenerating health and mana, If all party members lose all their health, the game is over. Party members who have lost all their health can only be healed by magic or medicine.

The player travels through environments such as forests, caves, mines, swamps, and castles. Some contain areas that affect the party by draining mana or causing them to fall asleep. Many contain features such as chests, which contain items when opened. Many levels also consist of multiple floors. The player will also come across shops where items can be purchased and sold using silver crowns. Many levels also contain puzzles such as escaping from an area or figuring out how to get to one.

== Plot ==
King Richard, ruler of Gladstone Keep, has received word that Scotia, an old witch, has acquired a ring called the Nether Mask, which allows its user to assume any form of any power or capability. The King sends the player out on a mission to acquire the Ruby of Truth.

When the player finds the ruby's guardian, he learns that it has been stolen as the guardian dies. When the player returns to Gladstone, Scotia poisons King Richard and escapes. The player is tasked with saving the King and defeating Scotia. To do this, the player obtains the recipe of an elixir that will cure King Richard. Once the recipe is obtained, the player travels through the realm to find the ingredients, and create the elixir. During their quest, they come across the Ruby of Truth, and when King Richard is cured, he gives the party the Shard of Truth, which combines with the Ruby to make the Whole Truth. The Whole Truth is then used against Scotia to defeat her.

== Development and release ==
After Westwood Studios was acquired by Virgin Interactive, the decision was made to drop the Advanced Dungeons and Dragons license to focus on a new property. Producer Rick Gush said that the executive producer Brett Sperry, was involved in the decision. Gush explained that Sperry knew about the benefits of such a venture, and Gush believed that creating a new brand was a good move for the studio's promotion. According to Joseph Hewitt, an artist for Westwood, Westwood wanted to develop their own properties instead of games for other publishers to profit from.

Westwood already had the engine and experience from the Eye of The Beholder series, but it was known that creating a new game was going to be difficult. Gush said that the lead programmer Philip Gorrow proposed the ideas for the new game. Bill Crum was hired and became the designer. Westwood's intention was to outperform Eye of The Beholder II, which included increasing the story's depth. One concern was making the game accessible so it could reach a wide audience. Hewitt said that Sperry wanted to make the game user-friendly. He also explained that the team did "odd things" for Advanced Dungeons and Dragons games. The team's desire to be different with Lands of Lore: The Throne of Chaos affected game design significantly, especially the in-game characterization. Sperry was frustrated at the prospect of creating a character for Advanced Dungeons and Dragons, which would have involved creating statistics which he knew little about. He came up with the idea of the player having a choice of four pre-made characters.

In response to the 3D graphics of Ultima Underworld: The Stygian Abyss, released in March 1992, Lands of Lore: The Throne of Chaos's development team expanded its 2D engine to include blurred movement to add a 3D-like effect. Although no longer tied to the Dungeons & Dragons license and system, a journalist for Computer Gaming World described an April 1993 preview of the game as being an incremental improvement to the Eye of the Beholder series with similar gameplay and an updated user interface.

Lands of Lore: The Throne of Chaos was released for MS-DOS in September 1993. An Amiga version with 32 colors was planned. Initial versions of the game contained a bug that prevented players from completing the game: at one point, the player can be tricked into handing over a crucial item. If the player does so, the item was supposed to be retrievable later in the game. The team missed this and did not put the item back into the game in the event the player handed it over, making the item permanently lost and the game unwinnable. One player who encountered this bug was asked to send his save game file to Westwood, so they could edit it to add the lost item to his inventory.

The game was re-released on CD-ROM in 1994, which featured voice-overs, some of which were performed by Patrick Stewart. It also features an additional narrative history read by Stewart. According to Gush, the team was "really impressed" with Stewart's professionalism, and he stated that they had paid $30,000 for him to be with the team for three hours. Stewart finished the voice-overs in less than three hours, and the team received a cardboard cutout of him in a Star Trek uniform. This version features 130 MB of digitized speech.

The game was re-released on GOG.com in November 2011, bundled with the sequel.

== Reception ==
Reception

Review scores
Publication	Score
Computer and Video Games	83%
Dragon	4/5
Edge	8/10
Hyper	86/100
PC Gamer (UK)	82%
PC Zone	90%
CD-ROM Today	5/5
Just Adventure	B
Génération 4	95%

Awards
Publication	Award
PC Gamer UK	#22 Top 50 PC Games of All Time
Computer Gaming World	Runner-up, Role-playing Game of the Year, June 1994

According to Westwood Studios, Lands of Lore was a commercial success, with global sales in excess of 250,000 units by November 1996.

Lands of Lore: The Throne of Chaos was well received. Writing for CD-ROM Today, Trent C. Ward called Lands of Lore one of the best games for the PC. Computer Gaming World's Scorpia stated that Lands of Lore "breaks new ground in a number of pleasantly surprising ways". She approved of the graphics that improved on those of Eye of the Beholder, sophisticated automap, and simplified skill, magic, and inventory systems. While disliking the combat, Scorpia concluded that "Lands of Lore is a better-than-average game of this type [and] worth playing, especially" for Eye of the Beholder fans. InfoWorld described it as "a new standard in" Dungeon Master-like games, with excellent UI, graphics, sound, puzzles, and story. While wishing to disable the automap, the magazine concluded that Lands of Lore "is destined to be a classic". The reviewer of Dragon believed the game's graphics are "good and quite varied" and said the game is not significantly more advanced than other RPGs. Despite this, he said that Lands of Lore: The Throne of Chaos was "a lot of fun to play" but criticized some puzzles for being easy. Ray Ivey of Just Adventure stated that the game is one of the longest he had ever played and said that locations with multiple levels cause the game to be repetitive. He also criticized the subtlety of certain aspects, such as requiring certain skills, but praised the combat and skill progression, saying they give the game "real purpose". Edge's reviewer praised the game for not being reliant on irrelevant statistics such as hunger and described it as "a joy to play". A reviewer of the French magazine Joystick believed the graphics are "beautiful" and the intermediary scenes "magnificent", but complained about the inability to skip non-interactive scenes. Paul Rand of Computer and Video Games believed that Lands of Lore: The Throne of Chaos is "everything Eye of the Beholder III should have been—and more" but criticized the game for being too easy because the party can frequently rest and heal. The review also described the presentation as "beautiful" and the animations as "wonderful". The reviewers of Génération 4 were highly complimentary: one described the graphics and animation quality as "perfect" and thought elements such as the scenarios and puzzles combined to make the "ultimate" role-playing game, and the other described the game as "Perfection in the domain of PC role-playing games".

Computer Gaming World in May 1994 said that the CD version's "quality voice-overs ... may offer just enough freshness to tackle this superb RPG again". Joystick thought the music and voices of the CD version are "excellent quality" but said that the CD version does not add much to the floppy original. PC Gamer UK said of the CD version that Stewart's voice evoked phrases from Star Trek: The Next Generation, and that it added "enormous weight" to the game's soundtrack, which was described as "spooky". The magazine added that the characters' voices were "really well directed" and that the CD version is what the game should have been from the start.

James Trunzo reviewed Lands of Lore: The Throne of Chaos in White Wolf #39 (1994), giving it a final evaluation of "Excellent", commending the game for its "strong" plot, "intriguing" puzzles, "fair" but "challenging" combat, and "fantastic" sounds, graphics and animation.

Lands of Lore was a runner-up for Computer Gaming World's Role-Playing Game of the Year award in June 1994, losing to Betrayal at Krondor. The editors wrote that it "features impressive special effects that some said couldn't be done in the MS-DOS world and a delightful story that blends together many of the classic fantasy archetypes of shape-shifting". Stewart won the Best Male Voice-Over Award. The editors wrote that he was perfectly cast as the royal monarch and that his vocal range gave a sense of urgency and reality to the game as the story unfolds.

In 1994, PC Gamer UK named it the 22nd best computer game of all time. The editors wrote that it was one of the few RPGs to compete against the Ultima series, while also being different.
