= Dune II =

1992 video game

- Developer: Westwood Studios
- Publisher: Virgin Games
- Directors: Aaron E. Powell; Lyle J. Hall
- Producer: Brett Sperry
- Designers: Joe Bostic; Marc Cram; Aaron E. Powell
- Programmers: Joseph Bostic; Scott K. Bowen
- Writers: Rick Gush; Donna J. Bundy; Marc Cram
- Composers: Frank Klepacki; Dwight Okahara
- Platforms: Amiga, MS-DOS, RISC OS, Genesis/Mega Drive
- Release: MS-DOS; December 1992; Amiga; 1993; Mega Drive/Genesis: NA: May 1, 1994; EU: June 1994; RISC OS; 1995
- Genre: Real-time strategy
- Mode: Single-player

Dune II: The Building of a Dynasty (titled Dune II: Battle for Arrakis in Europe and Dune: The Battle for Arrakis in North America for the Mega Drive/Genesis port, respectively) is a 1992 real-time strategy game developed by Westwood Studios and published by Virgin Games. It serves as the sequel to Dune (a more traditional adventure game), which came out earlier that same year.

While not the first real-time strategy (RTS) video game, Dune II established the format that would be followed for years to come. As such, Dune II is the archetypal real-time strategy game. Striking a balance between complexity and innovation, it was a huge success and laid the foundation for Age of Empires, Warcraft, Westwood Studios' subsequent strategy game Command & Conquer, and many other RTS games that followed.

== Plot ==
Emperor Frederick IV of House Corrino is desperate for the harvesting of the valuable drug melange (also known as "the spice"), found only on the planet Arrakis, to pay off all of his debt incurred on internecine wars with family members. To achieve this, he offers the sole governorship of Arrakis to whichever of the three Houses (Atreides, Harkonnen, and Ordos, the latter of which previously only appeared in the Dune Encyclopedia which is not considered canonical) delivers the most spice for him. War begins as deputations from all three Houses arrive on Arrakis.

The player is a military commander from a House of their choice. In the first few missions, the objectives are to successfully establish a base on an unoccupied territory of Arrakis, while harvesting spice and defending the base from enemy incursions. Later, as the three Houses begin moving against each other territories, missions will increasingly focus on destroying or capturing enemy bases. When the player dominates Arrakis on the world map, the two other enemy factions form a temporary alliance with the remnants of their armies. The final showdown is the battle between the player's House against both rival Houses, joined by the Emperor's Sardaukar (an unplayable elite force whose heavy infantry are particularly powerful). The introductory mission briefing and endgame cutscenes are different for each House, in keeping with their very disparate world views. The weaponry and units also vary from house to house.

== Gameplay ==
The player takes the role of the commander of one of the three interplanetary houses, the Atreides, the Harkonnen or the Ordos, with the objective of wresting control of Arrakis from the other two houses. House Ordos is not featured in the Dune novels and is mentioned only in the non-canon The Dune Encyclopedia. The basic strategy in the game is to harvest spice from the treacherous sand dunes using a harvester vehicle, convert the spice into credits via a refinery, and to build military units with these acquired credits in order to fend off and destroy the enemy.

The game map initially starts with a fog of war covering all area which is not covered by the player's units range of view. As the units explore the map, the darkness is removed. Unlike later games such as Warcraft II: Tides of Darkness, the fog of war is lifted forever with initial exploration; it does not become dark once more when units leave the area.

In addition to enemy incursions, there are other dangers such as the marauding, gigantic sandworm, capable of swallowing vehicles and infantry whole but blocked by rocky terrain. The player can only build on rocky terrain and must build concrete foundations to avoid deterioration of the structures due to the harsh weather conditions. Structures will still gradually decay over time regardless of the presence of those concrete slabs, but they save repair costs in the long run. Spice fields are indicated by orange coloration on the sand, darker orange indicating high concentration. Some spice may be concealed as bumps on the terrain (a "spice bloom") that become spice fields when they are shot at, or when a unit runs over them (the unit is destroyed in the ensuing "spice blow").

A map of the planet Arrakis is shown before most missions, where the player can choose the next territory to play in among two or three. This affects primarily the enemy house fought in the next mission, as all missions except the first two require the destruction of the enemy. Nine territories must be fought, irrespective of house, to reach the endgame.

The Dune II interface was the template for subsequent RTS designs.

Some key elements that first appeared in Dune II and later appear in many other RTS games include:

- A world map from which the next mission is chosen
- Resource-gathering to fund unit construction
- Simple base and unit construction
- Building construction dependencies (technology tree)
- Mobile units that can be deployed as buildings
- Different sides/factions (the Houses), each with unique unit-types and super weapons
- A context-sensitive mouse cursor to issue commands (introduced in the Mega Drive/Genesis version)

Completing higher missions gives authorization to use improved technology and higher-order weaponry unique to each House, ensuring varied game play. For example, House Harkonnen may be able to construct their Devastator tanks with heavy armor and ordnance but cannot build the similarly impressive Atreides Sonic Tank. The Ordos have access to the Deviator - a specialized tank firing a nerve gas that switches the allegiance of targeted units to Ordos for a limited period of time. The three Houses also are restricted in their production capabilities—House Ordos cannot build Atreides-style trikes, instead making the faster "Raider" trikes, while House Harkonnen eschews trikes completely, building only the heavier, more expensive "Quad" light attack vehicle.

A player can gain access to other Houses' special units by capturing an enemy Factory and manufacturing the desired units at the captured Factory.

Buildings may only be built in rocky zones and connected to another existing building. To protect them from constant wear, the player must first place concrete slabs in the construction areas. Production buildings can be upgraded at a cost several times, allowing the production of more advanced units or buildings.

The final prize for the commander is the building of the House Palace from where superweapons may be unleashed on opponents in the final closing chapters of the game. The House Harkonnen superweapon is a long-range powerful but inaccurate finger of missiles called the Death Hand, whereas House Atreides may call upon the local Fremen infantry warriors, over which the player has no control, to engage enemy targets. House Ordos may unleash a fast-moving Saboteur whose main purpose is the destruction of buildings.

The AI of Dune II was one of the first used in RTS games, and while better than that of Herzog Zwei, it has various drawbacks. Examples include only attacking the side of the player's base facing its own, and general inability to perform flanking maneuvers. Research into the game's engine revealed that the AI is in fact capable of more advanced strategy, but that a large part of these capabilities is unused due to consistently repeated errors in all of the game's mission scripts.

== Development ==
According to Virgin Interactive Entertainment vice president Stephen Clarke-Willson in 1998, the development of Dune II began when Virgin Interactive Entertainment planned to cancel the production of Cryo Interactive's adventure game Dune, after which he was given the task of figuring out what to do with the Dune license. After reading the original Dune novel, he decided that "from a gaming point-of-view the real stress was the battle to control the spice", so a resource-based strategy video game would be a good idea. It was around this time that employee Graeme Devine (who later founded Trilobyte) introduced to everyone at the Virgin office a real-time strategy game on the Sega Genesis / Mega Drive console called Herzog Zwei (1989). Clarke-Willson described it as a game where the player "kept clicking on stuff and then zooming off to another part of the screen. It was very hard to keep track of what was going on as an observer. Still, everyone liked it, it had fast action, and it was a strategy game". Virgin staff, including Clarke-Willson and Seth Mendelsohn (who later worked on the Ultima series), then went to Westwood Studios to talk about making a Dune game. According to Clarke-Willson, "Westwood agreed to make a resource strategy game based on Dune, and agreed to look at Herzog Zwei for design ideas". It later turned out that Cryo's game of the same name was not cancelled, and Westwood's real-time strategy game was called Dune II as a result.

Westwood Studios co-founder and Dune II producer Brett Sperry said in 2008 that conceptualization for the game began when Virgin president Martin Alper approached him with the offer of using their Dune license to produce a game, with the understanding that Cryo's Dune had been cancelled. In terms of video game design, Sperry said: "The inspiration for Dune II was partly from Populous, partly from my work on Eye Of The Beholder and the final and perhaps most crucial part came from an argument I once had with Chuck Kroegel, then vice president of Strategic Simulations Inc ... The crux of my argument with Chuck was that wargames sucked because of a lack of innovation and poor design. Chuck felt the category was in a long, slow decline, because the players were moving to more exciting genres ... I felt that the genre had a lot of potential – the surface was barely scratched as far as I was concerned, especially from a design standpoint. So I took it as a personal challenge and figured how to harness realtime dynamics with great game controls into a fast-paced wargame". He also stated that, while "Herzog Zwei was a lot of fun", the "other inspiration for Dune II was the Mac software interface", referring to the "design/interface dynamics of mouse clicking and selecting desktop items" which got him thinking: "Why not allow the same inside the game environment? Why not a context-sensitive playfield? To hell with all these hot keys, to hell with keyboard as the primary means of manipulating the game!" During production, he found out that Cryo rushed to finish their game first, leading to Virgin publishing their game as Dune and Westwood's game as Dune II, despite Sperry protesting against this decision. Louis Castle said in 1998 that the game's influence on the real-time strategy genre was unplanned, and that the team's goal was simply "to include all of the excitement and intensity of a war game, but with action-packed gameplay".

Other influences cited by Joseph Bostic (also known as Joe Bostic), the co-designer and lead programmer, and Mike Legg, one of the game's programmers, include the turn-based strategy games Military Madness (1989) and Civilization (1991), along with Herzog Zwei. According to Bostic, a "benefit over Herzog Zwei is that we had the advantage of a mouse and keyboard. This greatly facilitated precise player control, which enabled the player to give orders to individual units. The mouse, and the direct control it allowed, was critical in making the RTS genre possible".

== Release ==
Originally released for MS-DOS in 1992, Dune II was one of the first games to support the recently introduced General MIDI standard. The game audio was programmed with the middleware Miles audio library which handled the dynamic conversion of the game's MIDI musical score, originally composed on the Roland MT-32, to the selected soundcard. At initial release, the game's setup utility lacked the means to support separate output devices for the musical score and speech/sound-effects. This limitation was frustrating to owners of high-quality MIDI synthesisers (such as the Roland Sound Canvas), because users could not play the game with both digital sound effects (which MIDI synthesisers lacked) and high-quality MIDI score. Westwood later published a revised setup utility to enable users select a different soundcard for each type of game audio: digital speech, music, and sound effects.

Ports to the Amiga and Mega Drive/Genesis were released in 1993 and 1994 respectively. The Amiga floppy disk version has less detailed graphics and requires frequent disk swapping. Save games are stored on a specially formatted disk.

Two years later, it was also brought to the Archimedes and Risc PC range of RISC OS computers.

The Mega Drive/Genesis port has fairly different building and unit graphics, a full-screen menu-less user interface suited for gamepad control, and no save game support, relying on access codes for accessing each level. Other additions include a music test option and a tutorial that replaces the mentat screen. Several ideas from this version, including the music track listing and the replacement of sidebar command buttons by a context-sensitive cursor, were used in Westwood's next strategy game, Command & Conquer.

The game was ported to Android in 2013; also a fan-made port for Pandora became available based on OpenDUNE, the reverse engineered game engine.

== Reception ==
Reception

Review scores
Publication	Score
Mean Machines Sega	93% (Mega Drive)
MegaTech	91% (Mega Drive)
Mega Power	87% (Mega Drive)

According to Westwood Studios, Dune II was a commercial success, with global sales in excess of 250,000 units by November 1996.

Computer Gaming World in 1993 stated that the PC version of Dune II "easily outshines its predecessor in terms of game play ... a real gem", with "arguably the most outstanding sound and graphics ever to appear in a strategy game of its kind". A February 1994 survey of space war games gave it a grade of B+, stating that without online play, there was little replayability once each House conquered the planet, but a May 1994 survey of strategic space games set in the year 2000 and later gave the game five stars out of five, describing it as "a wargame par excellence; superb graphics and sound make an enjoyable gaming experience". Electronic Games gave the game a 92% score.

When the Amiga version of Dune II was released in 1993, it was met with positive reviews. CU Amiga magazine rated the game highly with 85%, praising the smooth gameplay and controls. Dune II received Amiga User International's Game of the Month award when it was reviewed in September 1993.

GamePro rated the Genesis version 17 out of 20, dubbing it "one of the best war strategy carts for the Genesis" while praising the controls, digitized speech, music, and fun gameplay. Electronic Gaming Monthly scored the Genesis version 32 out of 40, commenting that the gameplay is not only addictive, but easy to learn, which they stated is highly unusual for a strategy game. Game Informer rated it 8.25 out of 10.

In 1993, Computer Gaming World named Dune II Strategy Game of the Year. The game was ranked the 11th best game of all time by Amiga Power in 1996. In 1996, Computer Gaming World declared Dune 2 the 70th-best computer game ever released. In 2004, this "legendary" game entered the GameSpy Hall of Fame. In Poland, it was included in the retrospective lists of the best Amiga games by Wirtualna Polska (ranked eight) and CHIP (ranked fourth). In 2012, Time named it one of the 100 greatest video games of all time. In 1994, PC Gamer US named Dune II the 49th best computer game ever. That same year, PC Gamer UK named it the 21st best computer game of all time, calling it "a wargame for those who don't like wargames". In 1996, GamesMaster listed the Mega Drive version 8th in its "The Gamesmaster Mega Drive Top 10". In the same issue, they also ranked the PC version 21st on their "Top 100 Games of All Time".

== Legacy ==
Dune II was one of the most influential games in the real-time strategy genre, particularly in Westwood's own Command & Conquer series. Though not every feature was unique, its specific combination of a fog of war, mouse-based military micromanagement, and an economic model of resource-gathering and base-building became the hallmark of the RTS genre. It served as the template for subsequent real-time strategy games. Warcraft: Orcs & Humans, the first game published by Blizzard Entertainment, was developed by outright copying all artwork from Dune II and then redesigning each asset, though it accidentally retained the font of Dune II. Chris Taylor has stated that Dune II and Command & Conquer were great inspirations, driving him to leave Electronic Arts to create Total Annihilation.

Dune II also led to direct sequels: Westwood released a semi-remake for Windows in 1998 as Dune 2000, along with a PlayStation port in the same year. Westwood subsequently released Emperor: Battle for Dune in 2001. There are also fan-made game engine recreations, like Dune Legacy, OpenDUNE and Dune Dynasty, which aim for improved usability and controls while not changing the gameplay.
