= Eye of the Beholder (2002 video game) =

2002 video game

Dungeons & Dragons - Eye of the Beholder
- Game Boy Advance cover art
- Developer(s): Pronto Games
- Publisher(s): Infogrames
- Designer(s): Randy Angle
- Composer(s): Andrew Edlen
- Series: Eye of the Beholder
- Platform(s): Game Boy Advance
- Release: NA: November 8, 2002
- Genre(s): Role-playing
- Mode(s): Single-player

Dungeons & Dragons - Eye of the Beholder is a video game released for the Game Boy Advance in 2002, developed by American studio Pronto Games and published by Infogrames. It is an adaptation of the 1991 game of the same name.

== Plot ==
The once peaceful city of Waterdeep now suffers from raids every night by the Undermountain factions, who have somehow become reunited and organized. The raiders are led by Xanathar's Guild, who have returned to take over Waterdeep. Lacking in manpower from the City Watch, Piergeiron the Paladinson summons a group of adventurers to investigate the city sewers, uncover the evil entity, and destroy it.

== Gameplay ==
The games uses a stripped-down version of the 3rd edition D&D rules" with only four basic character classes and several traits, feats and skills. It is not a port of the original game, though it possesses roughly the same plot. It bears stronger resemblance to the original Gold Box games, such as Pool of Radiance.

Navigating through the dungeons is done in first-person mode, where the characters can make use of their skills to get through difficulties and have very limited use of spells. When an enemy is encountered, the game mode switches to an isometric view where the player engages in turn-based combat against monsters. Killing all enemies ends the combat mode. In some places, the player can recruit up to two additional characters, gather information and buy or sell items. Using items requires the player to equip them in a menu-driven inventory system.

== Reception ==
=== Critical reception ===
Reception

Aggregate scores
Aggregator	Score
GameRankings	52%
Metacritic	57%

Review scores
Publication	Score
Game Informer	55%
GameSpot	5.1/10
NGC Magazine	41%

The game received moderately negative reviews compared to the original computer game. It was given a 41% rating by NGC Magazine, criticizing it for its slow pace between exploration and combat, its bad interface and confusing menus, while highlighting only its variety of spells and character customization, that give the game some level of depth.

According to GameSpy, this game "only managed to be a curiosity for older gamers and an annoying Western-style RPG for a new generation of Nintendo fans who had no idea what a Gold Box game was".

=== Promotion ===
The game was showcased at the 2002 Electronic Entertainment Expo and presented at the DunDraCon XXVII the following year, where the company president and game designer Randy Angle was interviewed.
