= Herzog Zwei =

1989 video game

- North American cover art
- Developer: Technosoft
- Publisher: Sega: JP: Technosoft
- Programmer: Takashi Iwanaga
- Composers: Naosuke Arai; Tomomi Otani
- Platforms: Mega Drive/Genesis, Nintendo Switch
- Release: JP: December 15, 1989; NA: March 1990; EU: 1990
- Genre: Real-time strategy
- Modes: Single-player, multiplayer

Herzog Zwei (Note: Japanese: ヘルツォーク・ツヴァイ, Hepburn: Herutsōku Tsuvai) (pronounced [ˈhɛʁtsoːk ˈtsvaɪ]; German for 'Duke Two') is a real-time strategy video game developed by Technosoft and published by Sega for the Mega Drive/Genesis. An early real-time strategy game, it predates the genre-popularizing Dune II. It was released first in Japan in 1989 and worldwide in 1990. It is the sequel to Herzog, which was available on the Japanese MSX and PC-8801 personal computers.

Herzog Zwei combines the arcade-style play of Technosoft's own Thunder Force series with a simple, easy-to-grasp level of strategy. It has been cited as an inspiration to the developers of Warcraft, StarCraft, Dune II, and Command & Conquer and is also considered a precursor to the MOBA genre.

== Gameplay ==
Genesis version

The player directly pilots a flying, transforming mech, similar to the variable fighter depicted in Macross. It is a multi-role vehicle suited for utility and combat. Through the mech, the player purchases surface combat units, airlifts them across the battlefield, and issues them orders. These command activities can only be performed through the mech. Vehicles follow their assigned orders (patrol, garrison, capture base) until they either run out of fuel or are destroyed. Tactical re-deployment (mission reassignment, vehicle repair) involves a great deal of micromanagement, due to the required involvement of the mech.

Both the player's ground forces and the mech have finite fuel and ammunition. A prolonged engagement requires considerable micromanagement, as vehicles will not auto-repair, and the fragile combat-supply vehicles have a limited radius of service.

With a total of eight different types of land units to purchase, the player can determine the composition of his army. Each combat vehicle type represents a tradeoff between speed, anti-air, ground-attack, and cost. Units are assigned mission orders from a menu selection: "fight from a fixed position", "patrol this area", "fight in fixed radius" and "go to/attack/occupy intermediate base". New orders can only be issued during the airlift, and every time a unit's mission orders are reassigned, a cost is incurred.

In addition to the player's main base, there are nine permanent outposts scattered across the battlefield. These indestructible buildings are the only production resources on the battlefield. Once under a player's control, an outpost generates additional revenue (for purchase of units) and serves as a remote base of operations (repair/refuel, pick up delivery of purchased unit). A key strategy is to capture as many outposts as possible or deny enemy use through nuisance actions.

Herzog Zwei supports both single-player mode against the AI, as well as a two-player multiplayer mode. In single-player, the entire screen is devoted to the human-player's field of view. The game partially offsets the AI's inherent weakness by increasing the armor and offensive damage of computer player side with each advancing level.

== Reception ==
Reception

Review scores
Publication	Score
AllGame	4/5
Computer and Video Games	82%
Electronic Gaming Monthly	4/10, 6/10, 4/10, 3/10
Game Informer	9.75/10
Insomnia	5/5
Joystick	78%
Play Time	85%
Power Play	80%
Sega-16	10/10
The Games Machine	75%

Herzog Zwei was not a huge commercial success, due to its lack of marketing, relatively early release on the Genesis platform, and non-arcade genre on what was considered an arcade game console. Upon its 1990 release in North America, Electronic Gaming Monthly gave the game a rating of 4.25 out of 10, based on four individual reviewer scores of 4, 6, 4, and 3.

The Mega Drive version's reception in Europe was generally more positive. In the United Kingdom, in the April 1990 issue of Computer and Video Games, reviewer Paul Glancey gave the game an 82% score. He described it as "a game of conquest between two commanders in real time" and stated that what "sets it apart from other strategy games is that everything happens in real time. Both players are in action simultaneously and there are no pauses while decisions are taken so you have to think on the move or die". He noted that the command icons are "fairly easy to grasp" and concluded that it is a game that helps establish the Mega Drive as a "real" computer rather than "a machine for immobilized arcade players". Warren Lapworth reviewed the game in the March 1990 issue of The Games Machine magazine, giving the game a 75% score. He described it as an "unusual product" and stated that "whether it's intended to get strategists to consider buying the console or to broaden the horizons of trigger-happy lunatics, I don't know. Either way, it's quite refreshing and can be quite addictive in two-player mode, fierce rivalry developing between friends". In France, the game was reviewed in the November 1990 issue of Joystick magazine, where reviewer JM Destroy gave the game a 78% score. The game was particularly well received in Germany, where it was known as Herzog 2; Power Play magazine gave it an 80% score in its April 1990 issue, and Play Time gave it an 85% score in its June 1991 issue.

=== Retrospective coverage ===
Retrospective reviews have been very positive. David Filip of AllGame gave the game a score of 4 out of 5 stars, describing it as "one of the first" and "one of the best" strategy video games on home consoles and as "a fine cure for those days when you want a different kind of RTS to control". Game Informer in 1999 scored it 9.75 out of 10, making it the magazine's highest-rated Genesis game. Daniel Thomas of Sega-16 gave it a score of 10 out of 10 in 2004, describing it as "very probably the finest video game you've never played" and as the Genesis console's "finest hour". Lawrence Wright of Insomnia gave the game a score of 5 out of 5 stars in 2008. GameSpot users have given Herzog Zwei an average score of 8.8 out of 10 as of 2009.

It is often found on several "best of..." lists of video games, owing to its precedence in the real-time strategy genre, as well to the increasing understanding of finer points of its mechanics. It was featured in the "100 Best Games of All Time" list of Electronic Gaming Monthly, in the November 1997 issue which ranked it at #43, and in the January 2002 issue which ranked it #52. The September 1996 issue of Next Generation ranked it the 31st best game of all time, and the February 1999 issue ranked it 39th best— in both cases arguing that the strategic concept and level design were aped by more high-profile games like Cannon Fodder and Command & Conquer. It has been featured in IGN's "Top 100 Games of All Time", in the 2003 list which ranked it at #62, and in the 2005 list which ranked it #95. In 2003, GameSpy listed the game as one of the 25 most underrated games of all time. 1UP.com included the game in its "Essential 50" list of "The Most Important Games Ever Made". The U.S. game release packaging art was executed by veteran San Francisco game box illustrator Marc Ericksen, who had previously done the art for its sister game Thunder Force II.

== Legacy ==
The game concept of a central command and fighting vehicle directing other friendly units to attack remote enemy base appeared in past games, such as Sir Tech's 1984 game Rescue Raiders. However, Scott Sharkey of 1UP.com states that the 1988 game Modem Wars was possibly "[t]he closest predecessor" to Herzog Zwei, but that it "was fairly primitive and abstract by comparison", that earlier such games lacked the ability to construct units or manage resources which made them "much more tactical than strategic", and that the slower processors made the ticks "so long that the games were practically turn based". Total Annihilation (1997) and its spiritual successor Supreme Commander also inherit the concept of a large robotic command vehicle which is used to construct and command an army. Conversely, Total Annihilation and Supreme Commander are controlled in a similar fashion to traditional real-time strategy games; unlike in Herzog Zwei, the command vehicle in those games is mainly nothing more than a particularly powerful and versatile unit.

The producers of Dune II acknowledge Herzog Zwei as an influence, as do the producers of Warcraft (1994), Command & Conquer (1995), StarCraft (1998), War of the Ring (2003), and Brütal Legend (2009). Herzog Zwei is considered a predecessor to the MOBA subgenre, also known as action RTS, though a key difference is that Herzog Zwei has a fully customizable command unit with role-playing video game elements that the player has full control over, while commanding an army to go into battle with rather than mindless drones that respawn at set intervals. The 2014 battle arena game AirMech is also inspired by Herzog Zwei.

Herzog Zwei was re-released on Nintendo Switch as the final entry in the Sega Ages line of rereleases in Japan on August 27, 2020. This version was later released worldwide on September 24, 2020. It has online multiplayer, an interactive tutorial mode, widescreen with extra HUD support, difficulty options, and the ability to save replays.

Herzog Zwei was re-released for the Sega Genesis Mini 2 on October 27, 2022.
