= Machines (video game) =

1999 video game

- Developer: Charybdis
- Publisher: Acclaim Entertainment
- Platform: Microsoft Windows
- Release: NA: 14 April 1999; UK: 14 May 1999
- Genre: Real-time strategy
- Modes: Single-player, multiplayer

Machines (also known as Machines: Wired for War) is a 3D real-time strategy game released for Microsoft Windows. Published by Acclaim and developed by Charybdis. As a 3D game of this genre. Machines also allowed players to directly control units with both a first and third-person view.

== Gameplay ==
Machines uses a 3D polygonal landscape, which players can use to their advantage, attacking from or hiding behind hilltops. The viewpoint can be switched between a default isometric, strategic 'zenith' camera, and first person perspective; the latter typically being used to explore buildings during espionage missions.

50 different machines can be researched and built, characterized by a plasma-based techtree and a projectile-based techtree combined with different methods of movement (Examples: 4 or 6 Spider legs, Wheels, Tracks, Hover-engines, Flying, 2 Legs). Furthermore, battalions can be developed with specific strengths to support a personalized fighting strategy. The game also includes 25 different weapons, including Flame-throwers, Vortex Singularities, Plasma Rifles, Mini-guns, Ion Cannons and Nukes.

Sabotage and espionage missions allow units to deposit mines inside enemy buildings, steal research, and pass back vital information.

Machines is multiplayer over a LAN or the internet.

== Legacy ==
The game's source code was released by the new rights holder Nightdive Studios in October 2020. The source code is available under the GPLv3 license on GitHub. The game's assets are also available from the original developer's webpage.

== Reception ==
Reception

Aggregate score
Aggregator	Score
GameRankings	73%

Review scores
Publication	Score
AllGame	3/5
CNET Gamecenter	7/10
Computer Games Strategy Plus	3/5
Computer Gaming World	2/5
Edge	7/10
GamePro	4/5
GameRevolution	A−
GameSpot	6.5/10
IGN	7.2/10
Next Generation	3/5
PC Accelerator	7/10
PC Gamer (US)	72%

The game received above-average reviews according to the review aggregation website GameRankings. GameSpot praised the impressive graphics and camera modes but highlighted the poor unit pathfinding and unoriginal gameplay. Steve Butts of IGN said, "I'm sold on the different views in the game. That alone makes it stand out enough to be noticed. In addition to that however, Machines is a pretty solid strategy game." Next Generation said, "At the end of the day, Machines doesn't really add anything to the RTS genre, but it's a well-crafted, solid game that's original enough to keep your attention for as long as it takes to beat the game."
