= Eye of the Beholder II: The Legend of Darkmoon =

1991 video game

- Developer: Westwood Associates
- Publishers: Strategic Simulations; Cybille (FM Towns); Capcom (PC-98)
- Director: Brett W. Sperry
- Designers: Paul S. Mudra; Brett W. Sperry; Bill Stokes
- Programmer: Phillip W. Gorrow
- Writer: Marc Cram
- Composer: Frank Klepacki
- Platforms: MS-DOS, Amiga, FM Towns, PC-98
- Release: 1991: MS-DOS; Spring 1992: Amiga; 1993: FM Towns, PC-98
- Genre: Role-playing
- Mode: Single-player

Eye of the Beholder II: The Legend of Darkmoon is a role-playing video game and the sequel to Eye of the Beholder. It was developed by Westwood Associates and published for MS-DOS by Strategic Simulations in 1991. Versions followed for the Amiga, FM Towns, and PC-98. The game adds outdoor areas, increased interaction with the environment, and more role-playing elements. A third game, Eye of the Beholder III: Assault on Myth Drannor, was released in 1993.

== Plot ==
After the adventures of the first game, the heroes head to a local inn to rest and enjoy their newfound fame but a note gets slipped to them from Khelben "Blackstaff" Arunsun, Archmage of Waterdeep, who says that he sent a scout to investigate reports of evil brewing in a temple known as Darkmoon but she has not returned. Khelben then transports the heroes to the temple to find Amber and continue the investigation. While battling their way through the temple's clerics and other inhabitants, the players discover that the high priest, Dran Draggore, is assembling legions of skeletal warriors to attack Waterdeep. The players need to pass an acolytes' test to gain access to the inner parts of the temple. In the final confrontation, Draggore turns out to be a red dragon.

== Gameplay ==
The party engaged in combat. The game introduces outdoor environments to the series.

Much of the game remains within the confines of the temple, where the player is allowed to roam freely between locations once inside. The game itself features the catacombs beneath the Temple Darkmoon, the upper levels of the temple, and its three towers; silver, azure and crimson. Like the first game in the series, Eye of the Beholder II was also ported to the Amiga computer.

== Music ==
The game's music was composed by Frank Klepacki, and was one of the first games he worked on. To write the music, Klepacki used Visual Composer by AdLib for the AdLib YM3812 sound chip. Paul Mudra, who composed the music to the first game, did not have any involvement with the music, and worked only on sound effects along with Dwight Okahara. The PC-98 version contains all the songs from the MS-DOS version with the inclusion of new in-game songs for each main part of the game.

== Reception ==
Reception

Review scores
Publication	Score
Dragon	5/5 (MS-DOS)
The One	87% (Amiga)
Game Bytes	3/4

SSI sold 73,109 copies of Eye of the Beholder II. The Eye of the Beholder series overall, including Eye of the Beholder II, reached combined global sales above 350,000 units by 1996. The Lessers (Hartley, Patricia, and Kirk) reviewed the game in 1992 in Dragon #179, giving the game 5 out of 5 stars. Scorpia of Computer Gaming World in 1992 again criticized the sequel's user interface, noting that monsters attacked in real time while the player searched through spell books, but said that the game had a "fancy ending". She concluded that it was "a more substantial game" than its predecessor, with "more to do, a bigger variety of critters to fight and a larger area to explore". That year, the magazine named it one of the year's top role-playing games, stating that it followed in "the strong graphic and solid play-balance tradition of the original". In 1993 Scorpia reiterated her criticism but stated that the game was "a definite must for all EOB fans". GameSpy wrote that Eye of the Beholder II "sported a completely original ending, something that was badly needed, considering the game's biggest flaw -- the almost insane level of difficulty".

The One gave the Amiga version of Eye of the Beholder II an overall score of 87%, calling the graphics "beautifully-drawn" and animation "excellent". The One praises Eye of the Beholder II's sound effects and music, expressing that "the sampled sound effects are suitably spooky, and the music is appropriately atmospheric", and calls the UI "a tried and true one which is easy to pick up". The One criticises Eye of the Beholder II as "unoriginal", comparing it to similar RPGs such as Dungeon Master, and expressing a desire for more innovation.

Jim Trunzo reviewed Eye of the Beholder II: The Legend of Darkmoon in White Wolf #31 (May/June, 1992) and stated that "Eye of the Beholder II: The Legend of Darkmoon keeps is promise of being 'bigger...better...meaner than ever!', making it an even more enjoyable experience than the original."
