= Eye of the Beholder III: Assault on Myth Drannor =

1993 video game

- Developer: Strategic Simulations
- Publishers: Strategic Simulations; Ving Co. (FM Towns, PC-98)
- Producer: Nicholas Beliaeff
- Programmer: John Miles
- Composer: Mason Fisher
- Platforms: MS-DOS, FM Towns, PC-98
- Release: 1993: MS-DOS; 1994: PC-98; 1995: FM Towns
- Genre: Role-playing
- Mode: Single-player

Eye of the Beholder III: Assault on Myth Drannor is a role-playing video game published for MS-DOS in 1994 by Strategic Simulations. Conversions were released for the PC-98 (1994) and FM Towns (1995). The game follows Eye of the Beholder and Eye of the Beholder II: The Legend of Darkmoon.

== Plot ==
The player characters begin the game by telling the patron in a local tavern about how they defeated Dran Draggore and saved the town. A mysterious man then enters the tavern to ask them to rescue the ruined city of Myth Drannor from the Lich named Acwellan who rules the city. The man tells the characters that the Lich has an ancient artifact called the Codex that is needed to save Myth Drannor, and then he teleports them to just outside Myth Drannor after they agree to the quest.

The explorable areas of the game include the forest surrounding the city, the mausoleum, and also the city ruins which include a mage guild as well as a temple.

== Gameplay ==
The game employs an updated engine from the previous game, oft-unique NPC selection and tweaks to the gameplay including an 'All Attack' feature and the ability for characters to wield polearms while in the second rank.

== Development ==
Eye of the Beholder III: Assault on Myth Drannor was not developed by Westwood, the developer of Eye of the Beholder and The Legend of Darkmoon, but rather in-house by the publisher SSI. Westwood had been acquired by Virgin Interactive in 1992 and they created the Lands of Lore series instead.

The game uses the AESOP engine which later used in Dungeon Hack. Both games share the same enemy sprites, graphics, and sound effects.

== Reception ==
SSI sold 50,664 copies of Eye of the Beholder III. The Eye of the Beholder series overall, including the game's two predecessors, reached combined global sales above 350,000 units by 1996. GameSpy commented that "Eye of the Beholder III was a classic example of a company churning out a quick sequel to a good game and simply not giving it the love and care it really deserves". Computer Gaming World's Scorpia wrote that since the game "is the closeout of the EOB series, one would expect it to be on the spectacular side. Unfortunately, for several reasons, that isn't the case". She said that the graphics were inferior to the previous games', "aurally, the game is a nightmare", and that the "big fight at the end is a letdown". Scorpia concluded that "Assault on Myth Drannor is a disappointment ... What started as a series with great promise has, alas, ended on a mediocre note". She later called the game "dreary" with a "letdown" of an ending, and "only for the hard-core EOB player".

James Trunzo reviewed Eye of the Beholder III in White Wolf #37 (July/Aug., 1993) and stated that "New weapons, new monsters, new locales and even new weapons make Eye III better than its predecessors. If this series would get around to including an auto-mapper, we'd be in business."
