= Mars Saga =

1988 video game

- Developer(s): Westwood Associates
- Publisher(s): Electronic Arts (C64); Infocom
- Platform(s): Commodore 64, Apple II, MS-DOS
- Release: 1988
- Genre(s): Role-playing
- Mode(s): Single-player

Mars Saga is a role-playing video game developed by Westwood Associates and published by Electronic Arts for the Commodore 64 in 1988.

Following a legal battle regarding the franchise's intellectual property, Westwood contracted Infocom to publish the Apple II and MS-DOS ports.

== Plot ==
The player takes the role of Tom Jetland, a down-on-his-luck space traveller trapped on Mars after crashing his ship. While searching for jobs to make enough money to get back off the planet, he discovers a conspiracy hiding contact with what seems to be alien life.

The player visits the four Martian cities of Primus, Progeny, Parallax, and Proscenium, traverses the Martian surface, and visits abandoned mines.

The combat system features a bird's eye view of the battlefield. The player queues instructions for the party's characters to perform in real time.

== Reception ==
Computer Gaming World described the game as accessible to newcomers to the genre, including features like auto-mapping, allowing the player to save without switching disks, and allowing the computer to control the player's characters during combat.

== Mines of Titan ==
In 1989, the game was re-released on PC platforms, retitled Mines of Titan. The setting was moved from Mars to Titan, a moon of Saturn. The previously useless mining skill was fixed, and in Mines of Titan it is used to avoid cave-ins while adventuring in mineshafts. The other five useless skills were deleted.

The differences between Mars Saga and its sister game are mostly plot related. There are more side quests to complete, and more things that must be completed to forward the main plot. City layouts are the same and so are the enemies that are encountered, although there are more enemies in Mines of Titan.
