= Endacopia =

2026 point-and-click video game

- Developer: Andyland
- Publisher: Andyland
- Composer: Packtion
- Engine: Adventure Game Studio
- Platform: Windows
- Release: July 27, 2026
- Genre: Point-and-click adventure
- Mode: Single-player

Endacopia is a point-and-click adventure game developed and published by indie developer Andyland, whose real name is Andrés Guerrero, featuring music composed by Packtion. The game was released for Windows on July 27, 2026.

== Gameplay ==
Endacopia is a point-and-click adventure game where players switch between looking, touching, and speaking to interact with various objects and solve puzzles. Gameplay revolves around environmental interaction, puzzle-solving, encountering various creatures or monsters, and discovering hidden secrets scattered throughout the world. The game features specialized encounters, including minigames and boss fights. The game also includes various animated sequences that can be activated upon clicking on background objects.

== Plot ==
A boy named Mellow has been kidnapped by a giant lizard named Henry. In Henry's house, Mellow meets a sentient sign named Tip who gives hints throughout the game, a surgeon who can reanimate the dead, and a toilet creature who transports him to the world of Endacopia. On the way down, Mellow hits a pipe and falls apart, losing his eyes, mouth, and hands. He must retrieve them from three different areas, which can be explored in any order.

In the Office, Mellow retrieves his mouth from Genesis-01, the uploaded consciousness of the company's founder who has been trapped under cement by the fleshy AI now running the company. Mellow increases the company's productivity levels, which allows him to confront and defeat the AI. Mellow is brought back to the house by the toilet creature, who needs a map of the house. A secret tunnel in Mellow's room contains pieces of a drawn face belonging to Scribbly, a sentient mannequin. Once Mellow draws the face on Scribbly and helps her remember her name, she describes the map for Mellow to draw.

Timesville runs on a day-night cycle. Mellow finds his eyes by visiting a lighthouse only accessible at night, encountering flashbacks of a bear named Arthur, who spiraled into self-destructive behaviours. One day, Arthur was admiring the view from the balcony, then was pushed off by a mysterious figure. Arthur's ghost leads Mellow to his grave, where he bestows Mellow's eyes. Mellow meets many different townspeople and assists them in different ways. In doing so, Mellow solves a murder mystery at the hands of Ozzie, a chameleon who was wrongfully declared dead who now seeks vengeance by killing people and turning them into puppets.

In Misery Town, Mellow's hands are found in an invisible maze. Misery Town is run by the Trapezist, who uses people's misery for benefit and personal enjoyment. Through a series of puzzles, Mellow plays wingman to two employees, Ticketo and Ticketa, so he can gain access to the Trapezist's tent using Ticketo's speaker. After defeating the Trapezist, the toilet creature brings Mellow back to the house, now asking for a handsaw. A new secret passage is revealed, containing a mutated version of Mellow. Mellow retrieves a floppy disk to access Henry's computer account, which has the code for the locked box containing the handsaw. Mellow visits the attic and encounters the mutated Mellow again, who reveals Mellow had previously died and then been resurrected by the surgeon, causing him to lose his memories. The box contains a real and toy handsaw which, if chosen, each lead to a different ending.

In ending A, Mellow chooses the toy handsaw, and the toilet creature chastises him for dooming everybody and bans him from Endacopia. Mellow finds a new passageway in the hallway with a hole he cannot reach, so Tip helps him up. Mellow learns that Henry's house and Endacopia reside inside the body of a giant, and the only way out is through its mouth. While trying to escape, Henry attacks Mellow, hitting the giant's uvula and causing it to vomit up the residents of Endacopia. Mellow wakes up to find all of the characters living happily in a house in the desert.

In ending B, Mellow chooses the real handsaw and finds the toilet creature missing. One of the giant's teeth is cut out and Mellow escapes, wandering the desert and finding the toilet creature living in the house. Mellow continues wandering until he finds his real family, who are incredibly neglectful of him. His little sister wants a bedtime story, so Mellow begins recounting his adventures.

Ending C is unlocked by finding various secrets in each location. This leads to an encounter with the surgeon, whom Mellow can ask questions about the game's lore. The walls begin closing in as the giant wakes up. After playing through three endings, a secret ending becomes available where Andyland, the game's developer, performs a musical number that includes a minigame based on Dance Dance Revolution.

== Development ==
A free demo of Endacopia was released on Itch.io on October 25, 2022, paired with a Kickstarter. Andyland announced the release of Endacopia with a trailer on YouTube on July 27, 2026, confirming its availability on Steam.

The soundtrack for Endacopia was composed by Packtion.
