= Event 0 =

2016 first-person exploration video game

Event[0]
- Developer: Ocelot Society
- Publisher: Ocelot Society
- Engine: Unity
- Platforms: Windows; macOS; Linux
- Release: September 14, 2016
- Genre: Adventure
- Mode: Single-player

Event[0] is a first-person science fiction adventure game developed and published by Ocelot Society. It was released on September 14, 2016, for both Microsoft Windows and macOS. The game follows an astronaut en route to Europa, who, after their ship suffers a catastrophic failure, takes refuge in a dilapidated leisure ship, with the only remaining entity on board being the ship's AI, Kaizen-85. Gameplay consists of exploring the ship, repairing it in hopes of escaping, and speaking with Kaizen-85, an AI with whom the player can converse at length. The game received positive reviews upon release.

== Plot and gameplay ==
Event[0] is set in an alternate timeline where humanity achieved interplanetary space travel as early as the 1980s. The game takes place in this timeline's 2012, where the player's character is selected by International Transport Spacelines (ITS) to be part of a mission to Jupiter's moon Europa from Earth. En route, the ship suffers a catastrophic failure, and the player-character appears to be the only member of its crew to escape into a lifepod. The pod drifts for several weeks until it comes across the Nautilus, a leisure ship built in the 1980s. The player character docks with the ship and discovers that while the Nautilus is still functional, it has fallen into disrepair, with no sign of its human crew. The only conversations on the ship are through the ship's artificial intelligence (AI) named Kaizen-85 (from the Japanese word kaizen meaning "continuous improvement"), who communicates with the player-character through keyboard terminals throughout the ship. Kaizen-85 instructs the player-character to destroy the Nautilus's "Singularity Drive", the engine that powers the ship, as it claims this will enable it to return them both back to Earth. However, as the player explores the station more, they discover that many of the doors and systems have been locked down, apparently by the now missing previous human crew, and they must work with Kaizen-85 to access these systems.

The player communicates with the AI by physically typing input instead of selecting from a set of inputs. The AI is capable of procedurally generating over two million lines of dialog, with personality influenced by the player's input. The player must gather clues to discover what happened on the ship and eventually finds out that the Captain of the Nautilus, Anele Johnson, murdered Nandi, one of the crew members, so as not to allow Kaizen to destroy the Singularity Drive. When the player recovers the code to the bridge terminal and enters it, they can find Anele Johnson's body in one of the seats, who was presumably killed after merging with the Nautilus mainframe. Depending on the player's choices and their attitude toward Kaizen, multiple endings can occur.

=== Lore ===
The game takes place on the Nautilus, a luxury tourist ship owned by the ITS corporation (International Transport Spacelines). The Nautilus is equipped with an AI named Kaizen-85.

=== Endings ===
The first ending is achieved when the player allows Kaizen to destroy the Singularity Drive. The player will then engage in a conversation with Anele Johnson's consciousness via computer; she is angry at the player and explains that in order to save humanity, the player must upload their consciousness into the computer so as to overpower Kaizen. If the player agrees to this, the player character is killed, and their consciousness is uploaded to the computer. Within the computer system, they are told by Anele's consciousness that Kurt, the President of ITS, convinced Kaizen to lie about the Singularity Drive. She also explains that destroying the Drive will mean that humans will never develop advanced colonies. After going through all the doors, Anele asks the player if they want to go home, and the final door will open, and Earth can be seen in the distance before the credits roll.

The second ending is achieved if the player refuses to upload their consciousness. If the player has mistreated Kaizen and/or refused to destroy the drive, they will reply that they are "too old for this" and their memory from the Nautilus's mainframe and hand over control to the player. A cutscene then plays showing the current state of each room before the credits roll.

The third ending is achieved if the player refuses to upload their consciousness but treats Kaizen kindly enough; he will remember events during their time speaking before he launches the emergency boosters and tells the player, "Let's go home." A cutscene will play with the Nautilus steadily moving towards the Earth before the credits roll. This is the only ending in which the credits cannot be skipped.

Although the game has three defaults, a fourth ending can be achieved if the player refuses to destroy the Singularity Drive, refuses to upload their consciousness, and has treated Kaizen kindly throughout the game (in effect ignoring its MacGuffins). After questioning the player's trust, Kaizen can be nonetheless convinced to send the Nautilus to Earth despite the drive not having been destroyed. The same cutscene as the third ending then plays before the credits. This inadvertent fourth ending, which was due to a bug, has been labeled as the "secret ending".

== Development ==
Event[0] began as part of a graduate student project at the National School of Video Game and Interactive Media in France (Enjmin) in 2013. The students later formed Ocelot Society in order to continue development into a commercial project. The team that worked on Event[0] is composed of eleven people. In 2014, the game received the student award at the European Indie Game Days as well as the Innovation award at BIG 2015. Event[0] received funding from France's CNC as well as from the Indie Fund.

The game, as released, had three expected endings, with Ocelot Society having dropped a possible fourth ending prior to release. However, around July 2017, Emmanuel Corno, one of the developers and writers at Ocelot, noted that the Wikipedia page for the game described a different fourth ending to the game (the last one listed above), which he affirmed was possible to obtain in the released game and was not the same as the dropped ending. Corno attributed this unexpected ending to be the result of a bug the team had not caught at this point, but was pleased that it existed as the emergent gameplay made the artificial intelligence they created feel "more human".

== Reception ==
Reception

Aggregate scores
Aggregator	Score
Metacritic	75/100
OpenCritic	38% recommend

Event[0] received "generally favorable" reviews from critics, according to the review aggregation website Metacritic. Fellow review aggregator OpenCritic assessed that the game received fair approval, being recommended by 38% of critics. Reviewers have compared Event[0] to games such as the solitary narrative of Firewatch as well as the King's Quest series. The environment has been compared to the spaceship in Ridley Scott's Alien. Several reviewers have also noted the similarities between Event[0]'s Kaizen AI and HAL 9000 from Stanley Kubrick's film 2001: A Space Odyssey. A common complaint, even in otherwise positive reviews, is the game's very short play time: as little as 3 hours for the first playthrough and an hour for subsequent playthroughs for the other endings. Event[0] was nominated for the Seumas McNally Grand Prize and for the Excellence in Design and Excellence in Narrative awards for the 2017 Independent Games Festival.

A scholarly article indicated Event[0]'s references to the philosophy of Georg Wilhelm Friedrich Hegel (including graffiti) as well as the game's links to the posthuman turn in philosophy. The author of the article notes that the game reflects a change in the way artificial intelligence is portrayed in video games; AI in Event[0] does not have to become an enemy as had been common in video games, but can develop into an equal partner depending on the player's actions.
