= Paraphernalia (disambiguation) =

Paraphernalia refers to a collection of items or equipment associated with a particular activity, hobby, or lifestyle.

Paraphernalia may also refer to:

- Drug paraphernalia, any equipment that is used to produce, conceal, and consume illicit drugs
- A variety of tools and artifacts considered collectively
- Memorabilia and other collectables
- Regalia, the set of emblems, symbols, or paraphernalia indicative of royal status, as well as rights, prerogatives and privileges enjoyed by a sovereign, regardless of title
- Paraphernalia (album), a 1999 album by Enuff Z'nuff
- Paraphernalia, an English jazz band fronted by Barbara Thompson
- Paraphernalia, a 2009 book and DVD by Alessandra Celletti
- "Paraphernalia", a 2020 song by Temples
