= Eye of the Beholder (video game) =

1991 video game

- MS-DOS/Amiga cover art by Jeff Easley
- Developer: Westwood Associates
- Publishers: Strategic Simulations, Inc.; Capcom (Super NES); Sega (Sega CD); Pony Canyon, Inc. (PC-98)
- Director: Brett Sperry
- Designers: Phillip W. Gorrow; Eydie Laramore; Paul S. Mudra Joseph Bostic
- Artists: Rick Parks; Aaron E. Powell; Joseph B. Hewitt IV
- Writer: Eydie Laramore
- Composers: Paul S. Mudra; PC-98: Yuzo Koshiro; Shinji Hosoe; Sega CD: Yuzo Koshiro; Motohiro Kawashima
- Platforms: MS-DOS, Amiga, Sega CD, Super NES, PC-98
- Release: 1991 (MS-DOS, Amiga); 1992 (PC-98); April 1994 (Super NES); 4 May 1994 (Sega CD)
- Genre: Dungeon crawler
- Mode: Single-player

Eye of the Beholder is a role-playing video game for personal computers and video game consoles developed by Westwood Associates. It was published by Strategic Simulations, Inc. in 1991, for the MS-DOS operating system and later ported to the Amiga, the Sega CD and the Super NES. The Sega CD version features a soundtrack composed by Yuzo Koshiro and Motohiro Kawashima. A port to the Atari Lynx handheld was developed by NuFX in 1993, but was not released. In 2002, an adaptation of the same name was developed by Pronto Games for the Game Boy Advance.

The game has two sequels: the first was Eye of the Beholder II: The Legend of Darkmoon, which was also released in 1991; after Westwood Studios was acquired by Virgin Interactive in 1992, Eye of the Beholder III: Assault on Myth Drannor was released in 1993. The third game, however, was not developed by Westwood, who instead went on to create the Lands of Lore series.

== Plot ==
The lords of the city of Waterdeep hire a team of adventurers to investigate an evil coming from beneath the city. The adventurers enter the city's sewer, but the entrance gets blocked by a collapse caused by Xanathar, the eponymous beholder. The team descends further beneath the city, going through Dwarf and Drow clans, to Xanathar's lair, where the final confrontation takes place.

Once the eponymous beholder is killed, the player would be treated to a small blue window describing that the beholder was killed and that the adventurers returned to the surface where they were treated as heroes. Nothing else was mentioned in the ending and there were no accompanying graphics. This was changed in the later released Amiga version, which featured an animated ending.

== Gameplay ==
Beginning of the game (DOS)

As a first-person party-based dungeon crawler, Eye of the Beholder takes place in an underground environment rendered from a first-person perspective in pseudo-3D graphics. The design and gameplay are similar to Dungeon Master from 1987. The player controls four characters, initially, using a point-and-click interface to fight monsters. This can be increased to a maximum of six characters, by resurrecting one or more skeletons from dead non-player characters (NPCs), or finding NPCs that are found throughout the dungeons.

The ability to increase the size of the player's party through recruiting NPCs was included in all three games in the Eye of the Beholder series. It was also possible to import a party from Eye of the Beholder into The Legend of Darkmoon or from The Legend of Darkmoon into Assault on Myth Drannor; thus, a player could play through all three games with the same party.

== Development ==
The graphics for the MS-DOS version were created using Deluxe Paint. Over 150 Adlib sound effects exist in the game's audio.

== Reception ==
=== Critical reception ===
Reception

Review scores
Publication	Score
ACE	780/1000 (MS-DOS)
AllGame	3/5 (MS-DOS)
Computer and Video Games	96% (MS-DOS); 95% (Amiga); 87% (Sega CD)
Dragon	5/5 (MS-DOS)
Electronic Gaming Monthly	7.2/10 (Sega CD); 6.2/10 (Super NES)
Famitsu	28/40 (Sega CD)
The One	92% (Amiga)
Sega Power	81% (Sega CD)
MikroBitti	94% (MS-DOS)

Eye of the Beholder was reviewed in 1991 in Dragon #171 by Hartley, Patricia, and Kirk Lesser in "The Role of Computers" column, who gave it 5 out of 5 stars. It was #1 on the Software Publishers Association's list of top MS-DOS games for April 1991, the last SSI D&D game to reach the rank. Dennis Owens of Computer Gaming World called it "a stunning, brilliantly graphic and agonizingly tricky" 3-D CRPG. The magazine stated that the game's VGA graphics and sound card audio finally gave IBM PC owners a Dungeon Master-like game. Scorpia, another reviewer for the magazine, was less positive. Although also praising the graphics and audio, stating that they "really give you the feeling of being in an actual dungeon", she criticized the awkward spell user interface and the "outrageous" abrupt ending. Other areas that needed work included the combat, plot, and NPC interaction; nonetheless, she was hopeful that with such improvements "the Legend series will become one of the leaders in the CRPG field". In 1993, Scorpia called the game "an impressive first effort that bodes well for the future".

Jim Trunzo reviewed Eye of the Beholder in White Wolf #27 (June/July, 1991), rating it a 5 out of 5 and stated that "While the unforgiving nature of Eye of the Beholder makes the basic dungeon crawl a challenge, the graphics and sound employed in the game might well make it a classic!"

The One gave the Amiga version of Eye of the Beholder an overall score of 92%, heavily comparing it to Dungeon Master, stating that "comparisons to the [aging] classic – Dungeon Master – are inevitable. When two games look this similar, even their programmers would have trouble telling them apart". The One praises Eye of the Beholder's gameplay, stating that "in contrast to previous AD&D titles, there's more emphasis on puzzle-solving than combat – a refreshing change ... Combat is also handled extremely well, the spells and 'ranged weapons' rules are all faithful to the original game ... The gameplay works wonderfully, conjuring up both the spirit and the atmosphere that you get from [tabletop AD&D]". Despite this, The One expresses that Eye of the Beholder is on par with Dungeon Master and Chaos Strikes Back, but states that Eye of the Beholder is still "an essential purchase for followers of the AD&D series".

Hailing the game as "a dream come true" for Dungeons & Dragons fans, Electronic Gaming Monthly gave the Super NES version a 6.2 out of 10, praising its 3-D graphics and variety of characters. They gave the Sega CD version a 7.2 out of 10, this time praising the ability to create custom characters but criticizing the audio. They also remarked that the game has a difficult learning curve. While reviewing the Sega CD version, Computer and Video Games said it is "not quite up there with Snatcher, but without doubt a highly ace role-player".

According to GameSpy in 2004, despite the issues in the first Eye of the Beholder, "most players found the game well worth the effort". IGN ranked Eye of the Beholder No. 8 on their list of "The Top 11 Dungeons & Dragons Games of All Time" in 2014. Ian Williams of Paste rated the game #8 on his list of "The 10 GreatestDungeons and Dragons Videogames" in 2015. In 1991, PC Format placed Eye of the Beholder on its list of the 50 best computer games of all time. The editors called it a "classic romp through dungeons dealing with monsters, puzzles, traps and things mythical".

=== Commercial performance ===
SSI sold 129,234 copies of Eye of the Beholder. By mid-1991, over 150,000 copies had been sold worldwide. The Eye of the Beholder series overall, including the game's two sequels, reached global sales above 350,000 units by 1996.

=== Promotion ===
In January 1991, SSI participated in Computer Gaming World's Top Ad contest and their cover art for Eye of the Beholder came in first place among voting readers, despite the magazine publisher's objection to the piece. From February till October, SSI started up a contest "Beholder Bonus", which required players to find a bonus feature (easter egg) in each level of the game, indicated by an onscreen message. The first 50 PC players and 50 Amiga players to discover all 12 features would win $100 worth of prizes.

== Legacy ==
=== Sequels ===
There were two sequels: Eye of the Beholder II: The Legend of Darkmoon used a modified version of the first game's engine, added outdoor areas and greatly increased the amount of interaction the player had with their environment, along with substantially more 'roleplaying' aspects to the game.

Eye of the Beholder III: Assault on Myth Drannor was not developed by Westwood, the developer of Eye of the Beholder and The Legend of Darkmoon, but rather in-house by the publisher SSI.

Eye of the Beholder Trilogy (1995, SSI) was a rerelease of all the three games for MS-DOS on CD-ROM. Interplay released the three games along with a number of other AD&D DOS Games in two collection CDs: The Forgotten Realms Archives (1997) and Gamefest: Forgotten Realms Classics (2001).

=== Related games ===
Several modules for Neverwinter Nights (2002) have been created by fans as remakes of the original Eye of the Beholder game. A team of Indie game developers led by Andreas Larsson did a fan conversion of the game for the Commodore 64 available for free as a cartridge image.
