= Brett Sperry =

American gallerist, developer, video game designer, and photographer

Brett W. Sperry
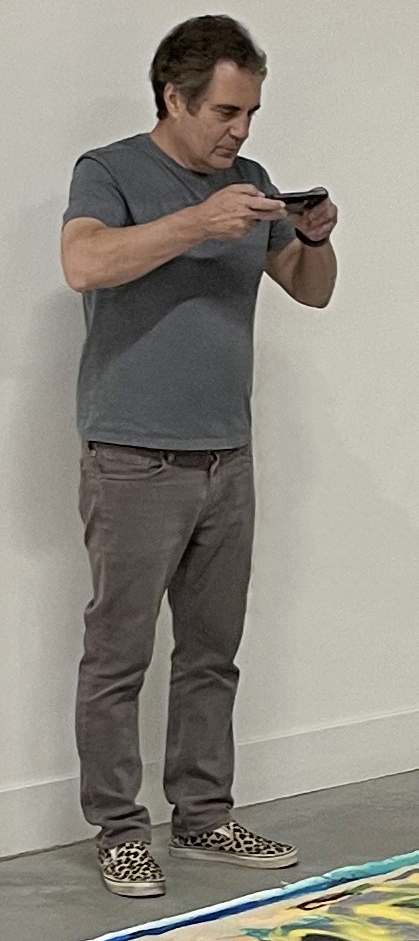
- Brett Sperry curating 2024 exhibit
- Born: Brett Wesley Sperry; Newington, Connecticut, U.S.
- Website: www.brettsperry.com

Brett Sperry is an American video game designer, fine arts gallerist, and professional photographer. He is also a prominent developer of the Las Vegas arts community, where he has made significant investments in property and infrastructure, primarily in the Downtown Las Vegas area.

In the world of video and computer games, Sperry was the co-founder and president of Westwood Studios, where he created the Command and Conquer series, among other titles. During this time, Sperry was named the sixth most influential person in the history of computer gaming and listed among top ten best game developers. Westwood Studios later received the 2015 Industry Icon Award, presented by 2015 Game Awards host Kiefer Sutherland.

== Background and education ==
Brett Sperry moved from his native Connecticut to the Las Vegas Valley in 1979. He later spent a year at Arizona State University, where he studied psychology and architecture. A self-taught programmer, he began his professional work with video and computer games in Las Vegas, Nevada, where he performed contract work for hire with Imagic and other companies.

== Video and computer games ==
=== Westwood Studios ===
In 1985, from a suburban Las Vegas garage, Brett Sperry and his business partner Louis Castle founded Brelous Software, with Sperry serving as president and Executive Producer. Two months later, they renamed the company Westwood Associates, and in 1992, they changed the name again to Westwood Studios, reflecting their studio-like approach to the business.

As the company became more successful, Sperry and Castle received full buyout offers from both Sierra Entertainment and Richard Branson’s satellite division, Virgin Interactive (a division of Spelling Entertainment Group). In 1992, Sperry and Castle sold Westwood Studios to Virgin, despite receiving a higher offer from Sierra, citing the potential for greater freedom and autonomy. As Westwood grew into one of the most successful video and computer game companies, Sperry continued as President and Executive Producer. However, in 1997, he took on a larger role as Virgin Interactive's President of Worldwide Development, an internal effort to turn Virgin's struggling video game divisions into a profitable enterprise.

In 1998, Electronic Arts purchased the Westwood library and assets outright from Spelling/Virgin.

=== Jet Set Games ===
In early 2009, Brett Sperry announced the collaborative launch of the Las Vegas-based software publisher Jet Set Games, a computer gaming company focused on mobile devices such as iPads and iPhones. The company's first successful release was the Highborn strategy game.

== Las Vegas arts developer ==
Since 2007, Brett Sperry has been a central figure in the development of the Las Vegas arts community.

=== Brett Wesley Gallery and Artifice Lounge ===
Starting with a 2007 Downtown Las Vegas land purchase, Brett Sperry built and designed the award-winning Brett Wesley Gallery, which became home to a succession of notable art installations, exhibits, and international artists. In 2016, Brett Wesley Gallery was named the "Best of the City."

Brett Wesley (Gallery) remains a cultural staple.

— National Public Radio, Best of the City (2016): These Are the Champions

Sperry then acquired additional parcels nearby, and in collaboration with development partner Trinity Schlotmann, he created the Artifice Lounge, a multi-use "art-inspired" bar and lounge that Sperry designed from what was formerly an empty 1950s warehouse.

=== Art Square ===
Sperry made a sizable economic and architectural investment in the creation of the adjacent Art Square, a 20,000-square-foot site featuring retail and professional spaces, desert gardens, a performance arts theater, and a restaurant—all of which, apart from the restaurant, Sperry conceived and designed.

The Art Square complex was sold to Las Vegas Arts District Development in 2015.

=== The Modern Contemporary and Luminous Park ===
In 2009, Sperry became the spearhead and Chairman of a proposed $29-million international-class arts museum based in Las Vegas called "The Modern Contemporary." The museum and its grounds are part of a conceptual entity known as "Luminous Park."

Sperry's tenure as Chairman was contractually completed in 2014. Since then, he has been an active member of the board of directors.
