= Westwood Studios =

American video game developer

Westwood Studios, Inc.
- Formerly: Brelous Software (1985); Westwood Associates (1985–1992)
- Type: Subsidiary
- Industry: Video games
- Founded: 1985; 41 years ago
- Founders: Brett Sperry; Louis Castle
- Defunct: March 31, 2003
- Fate: Merged into EA Los Angeles
- Headquarters: Las Vegas, Nevada
- Key people: Brett Sperry; Louis Castle; Joseph D. Kucan
- Products: Eye of the Beholder series; The Legend of Kyrandia series; Dune series; Lands of Lore series; Command & Conquer series
- Parent: Virgin Interactive Entertainment (1992–1998); Electronic Arts (1998–2003)
- Website: westwood.com (archived homepage on March 4, 2000)

Westwood Studios, Inc. was an American video game developer based in Las Vegas, Nevada. It was founded by Brett Sperry and Louis Castle in 1985 as Brelous Software, but got changed after 2 months into Westwood Associates and was renamed to Westwood Studios when Virgin Games (later Virgin Interactive Entertainment) bought the company in 1992. The company was bought by Electronic Arts alongside Virgin Interactive's North American operations in 1998. In January 2003, it was announced that Westwood, alongside Westwood Pacific (EA Pacific), would be merged into EA Los Angeles. The main studio location closed in March of that year.

Westwood is best known for developing video games in the real-time strategy, adventure and role-playing genres. It was listed in Guinness World Records for selling 30 million copies of Command & Conquer games worldwide.

== History ==
=== Early history and company name ===
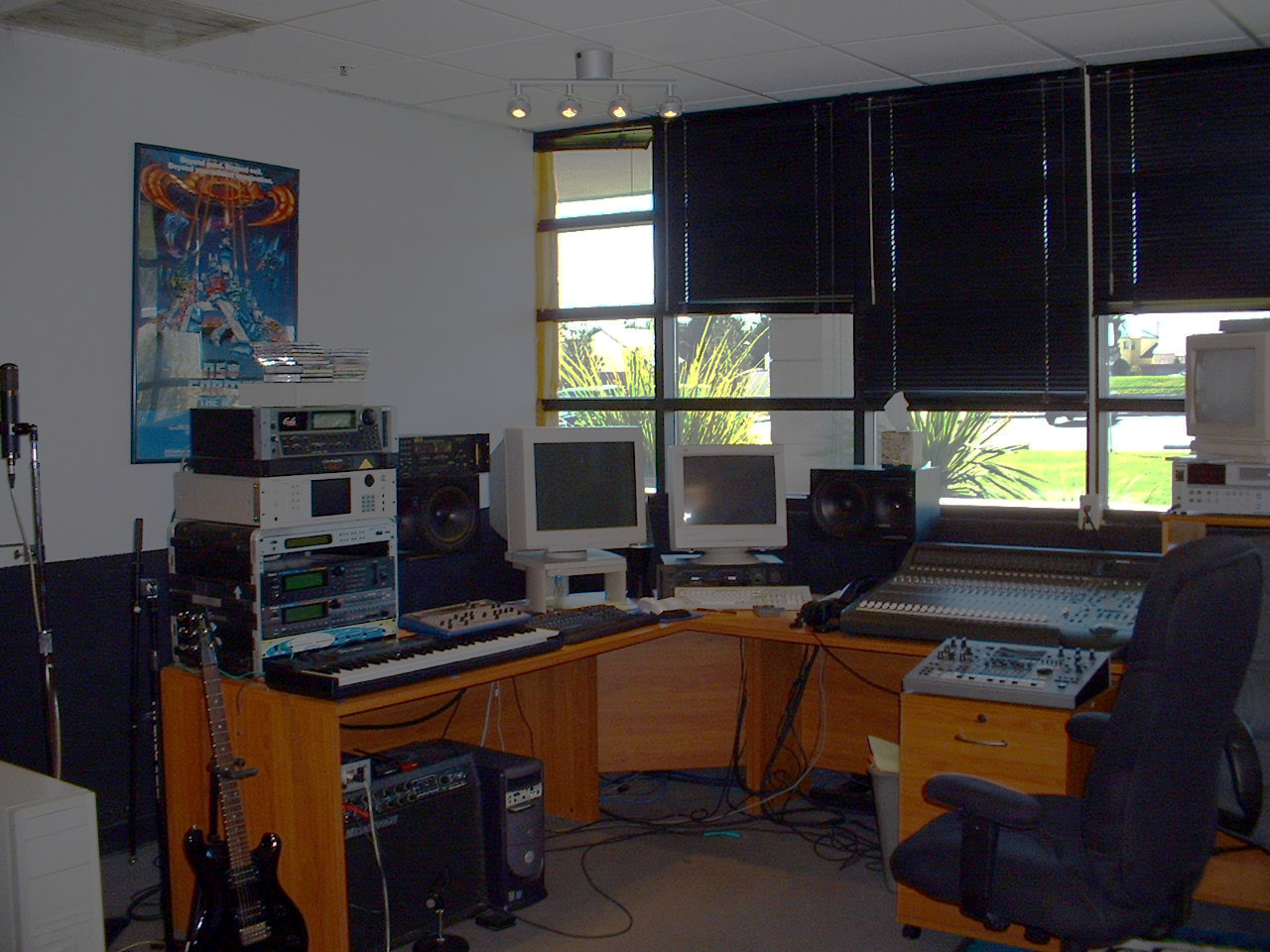
Westwood Studios former office

Brett Sperry and Louis Castle met in late 1983 in Las Vegas. Sperry had a background in architecture and psychology and was already working in the gaming industry. Both Sperry and Castle worked as contract programmers. The two eventually became friends and decided to form a company together and named it Brelous Software. It was later renamed Westwood Associates.

According to Louis Castle, the company was named after the "entertainment meets professional" character of the Westwood neighborhood in Los Angeles.

We really liked the "entertainment meets professional" character of Westwood CA (in L.A.) and the attraction of the area to teens and young adults felt like the perfect fit for a new company specializing in entertainment software. Even back then we recognized that it took a team of people to make great products so we appended the "Associates" to emphasize that aspect of product development. We were not really sure if we could make a go at game development so the original name "Westwood Associates" also gave us the ability to get into more traditional business software if necessary.

The company's first projects consisted of contract work for companies like Epyx and Strategic Simulations, Inc. (SSI), porting 8-bit titles to 16-bit systems like Commodore Amiga and Atari ST. Proceeds from contract work allowed the company to expand into designing its own games in-house. Their first original title was Mars Saga, a game developed for Electronic Arts and released in 1988. They laid the foundations for the real-time strategy genre with the release of real-time tactics game BattleTech: The Crescent Hawk's Revenge, one of the more literal translations of the tabletop game BattleTech.

=== Later success and acquisition by Virgin Games ===
One of the company's first great successes was Eye of the Beholder (1991), a real-time role-playing video game based on the Dungeons & Dragons license, developed for SSI. Other publishers of early Westwood games included Infocom and Disney. Their company was eventually acquired by Virgin Games in 1992.

The company in the late 1980s was known for shipping products late, but by 1993 it had so improved that, Computer Gaming World reported, "many publishers would assure [us] that a project was going to be completed on time because Westwood was doing it". The magazine added that it "not only has a solid reputation for getting product out on time, but a reputation for good product", citing Eye of the Beholder, The Legend of Kyrandia, and Dune II as examples. By then Westwood had about 50 employees, including up to 20 artists. Other Westwood titles from the early 1990s include Lands of Lore, The Lion King and Young Merlin. Westwood's greatest commercial success would start in 1995 with the real-time strategy game Command & Conquer. Building on the gameplay and interface ideas of Dune II, it added pre-rendered 3D graphics for gameplay sprites and video cinematics, an alternative pop/rock soundtrack with techno elements streamed from disk, and online play. Command & Conquer, Kyrandia, and Lands of Lore spawned several sequels.

=== Acquisition by EA and liquidation ===
In August 1998, Westwood and sister company Burst Studios was acquired by Electronic Arts for $122.5 million from Virgin Interactive's North American operations, which EA also acquired. At the time, Westwood games had a 5% to 6% share of the PC game market, especially the Command & Conquer franchise was considered very valuable. The 50,000 square foot building in Las Vegas included motion capture facilities, comfortable offices and was considered a showcase for the industry. According to Westwood Studios designer and programmer Joe Bostic, Electronic Arts did not interfere with Westwood's operations primarily due to Westwood co-founder Brett Sperry's efforts in keeping the corporate cultures of the two companies separate, but eventually Westwood succumbed to wishes that every game had to be a hit.

The last games Command & Conquer: Renegade and Earth & Beyond did not meet expectations of the publisher. In January 2003, EA announced its intent to close Westwood, as well as EA Pacific, and merge them into EA Los Angeles as part of a consolidation plan. This move included "significant layoffs" for Westwood, which at the time employed 100 people, while the remaining people were given the option to transfer to the Los Angeles studio or EA's headquarters. Most employees were let go by January 31, while some staff stayed with Westwood transitionally until it was fully closed on March 31, 2003. Some formed Petroglyph Games in April 2003, while another three (Brett Sperry, Adam Isgreen and Rade Stojsavljevic) formed a development studio called Jet Set Games in 2008, both based in Las Vegas, Nevada.
