= List of Alan Carr: Chatty Man episodes =

Alan Carr: Chatty Man is a British chat show hosted by Alan Carr on Channel 4 that began in 2009. The sixteenth and final series premiered on 3 March 2016.

Overnight ratings are taken from Digital Spy and will be replaced if official ratings are released from BARB. Official ratings may include Channel 4 +1 if available.

== Episodes ==
=== Series 1 ===
Date	Episode number	Guests	Performance	Ratings (millions)
Filmed in May	Pilot 1	Jerry Springer, Denise van Outen, Robert Webb and Pet Shop Boys	Pet Shop Boys performed "Did You See Me Coming?"	—N/a
Filmed in May	Pilot 2	Ronnie Corbett, Joanna Page, Gok Wan and Noisettes	Noisettes performed "Don't Upset the Rhythm"	—N/a
14 June 2009	1	Bruce Forsyth, Ross Kemp, Heather Graham and Pet Shop Boys	Pet Shop Boys performed "Did You See Me Coming?"	2.15
21 June 2009	2	Samuel L. Jackson, Ivana Trump and Katy Perry	Katy Perry performed "Waking Up in Vegas"	1.80
28 June 2009	3	Jerry Springer, Martina Navratilova and The Black Eyed Peas	The Black Eyed Peas performed "I Gotta Feeling"	Under 1.44
5 July 2009	4	David Walliams, Dawn French, Kirstie Allsopp, Phil Spencer and La Roux	La Roux performed "Bulletproof"	1.64
12 July 2009	5	Fern Britton, Sarah Harding, Kanye West and Mr Hudson	Mr Hudson and Kanye West performed "Supernova"	1.86
19 July 2009	6	Jonathan Ross, Denise van Outen, Mickey Rourke and JLS	JLS performed "Beat Again"	1.52
26 July 2009	7	Rupert Everett, Barbara Windsor, Kevin Bishop and The Enemy	The Enemy performed "Be Somebody"	Under 1.51
2 August 2009	8	Shane Warne, Patsy Kensit, Gok Wan and Calvin Harris	Calvin Harris performed "Ready for the Weekend"	Under 1.45
9 August 2009	9	Peter Andre, Natalie Imbruglia, Frank Skinner and Noisettes	Noisettes performed "Wild Young Hearts"	1.82
16 August 2009	10	Jack Dee, Amanda Holden, Alan Dale and Pixie Lott	Pixie Lott performed "Boys and Girls"	1.26

=== Series 2 ===
A second series began airing on 19 November 2009. Christmas and New Year's specials were confirmed and aired in December.

Date	Episode number	Guests	Performance	Ratings (millions)
19 November 2009	1	Simon Pegg, Noel Fielding and Mariah Carey	Mariah Carey performed "I Want to Know What Love Is"	Under 1.59
26 November 2009	2	Ruth Jones and James Corden, Chris Moyles, Westlife and Alesha Dixon	Alesha Dixon performed "The Light"	1.21
3 December 2009	3	Kate Hudson, David Mitchell, Sharon Osbourne and Chipmunk and Talay Riley	Chipmunk and Talay Riley performed "Look For Me"	Under 1.56
10 December 2009	4	Michael McIntyre, Chris Evans and Miley Cyrus	Miley Cyrus performed "Party in the U.S.A."	1.49
17 December 2009	5	Bette Midler, Johnny Vegas and JLS	JLS performed "One Shot" feat. The Back Blue Boys	Under 1.64
22 December 2009	6 (Christmas Special)	Cilla Black, Justin Lee Collins, Eoghan Quigg, David Walliams, Christopher Biggins, Abigail Clancy and The Saturdays	The Saturdays performed "Ego" and "All I Want for Christmas Is You"	1.60
29 December 2009	7 (New Year's/Hogmanay Special)	Davina McCall, Catherine Tate, David Tennant and Spandau Ballet	Spandau Ballet performed "Gold"	1.70

=== Series 3 ===
A new series began on 4 February 2010 for 8 episodes.

Date	Episode number	Guests	Performance	Ratings (millions)
4 February 2010	1	Ricky Gervais, Katie Price, Vinnie Jones and Corinne Bailey Rae	Corinne Bailey Rae performed "Paris Nights/New York Mornings"	2.07
11 February 2010	2	Daryl Hannah, Nicholas Hoult, Sid Owen, Patsy Palmer and Mika	Mika performed "Blame it on the Girls"	Under 1.78
18 February 2010	3	Alex Reid, Jimmy Carr, Janice Dickinson and Ke$ha	Ke$ha performed "Blah Blah Blah"	1.98
25 February 2010	4	Courtney Love, Steve Jones and Rihanna	Rihanna performed "Rude Boy"	Under 1.87
4 March 2010	5	Ant & Dec, John Barrowman, Jo Frost and Ellie Goulding	Ellie Goulding performed "Starry Eyed"	Under 1.71
11 March 2010	6	Lindsay Lohan, Torvill and Dean, Frankie Boyle and Mary J. Blige	Mary J. Blige performed "I Am"	Under 1.80
18 March 2010	7	Miranda Hart, Russell Howard, Justin Bieber, David Haye and Florence and the Machine	Florence and The Machine performed "Dog Days Are Over"	Under 1.85
25 March 2010	8	Kim Cattrall, Boy George and N-Dubz	N-Dubz performed "Say It's Over"	Under 1.82

=== Series 4 ===
Series 4 premiered on 20 June 2010 for a 12-episode run.

Date	Episode number	Guests	Performance	Ratings (millions)
20 June 2010	1	Russell Brand, Pamela Anderson, Matthew Morrison, Kevin McHale, Jenna Ushkowitz, and Plan B	Plan B performed "Prayin'"	1.79
27 June 2010	2	Katie Price, Alex Reid, James Corden and Enrique Iglesias	Enrique Iglesias performed "I Like It"	1.87
4 July 2010	3	Shakira, Louie Spence, Nikki Reed, Kellan Lutz, Ashley Greene, Xavier Samuel and Kelis	Kelis performed "4th of July (Fireworks)"	1.50
11 July 2010	4	Grace Jones, Gok Wan and JLS	JLS performed "The Club Is Alive"	1.23
18 July 2010	5	John Bishop, Jared Leto and Kylie Minogue	Kylie Minogue performed "All The Lovers" and "Get Outta My Way"	1.73
25 July 2010	6	Vic Reeves, Bob Mortimer, Ulrika Jonsson, Joanna Page and Scissor Sisters	Scissor Sisters performed "Running Out"	1.64
1 August 2010	7	Alice Cooper, David Walliams and The Saturdays	The Saturdays performed ""Missing You""	1.37
8 August 2010	8	Robin Williams, Bobcat Goldthwait, Olly Murs, Jason Manford, Alex Jones and Tinchy Stryder	Tinchy Stryder performed "In My System"	1.36
15 August 2010	9	Ricky Gervais, Stephen Merchant, Minnie Driver and Alexandra Burke	Alexandra Burke performed "Start Without You"	1.41
22 August 2010	10	Drew Barrymore, Gary Lineker, Danielle Lineker, Phill Jupitus and Goldfrapp	Goldfrapp performed "Believer"	1.59
29 August 2010	11	Whoopi Goldberg, Jedward, Kim Cattrall and McFly	McFly performed "Party Girl"	0.83
5 September 2010	12	Paul O'Grady, Davina McCall, Katy Perry and Brandon Flowers	Brandon Flowers performed "Crossfire"; Katy Perry performed "Teenage Dream"	1.54

=== Series 5 ===
Series 5 began on 13 December 2010 and included 3 Christmas/New Year's specials.

Date	Episode number	Guests	Performance	Ratings (millions)
13 December 2010	1	David Hasselhoff, Simon Bird, Joe Thomas, James Buckley, Blake Harrison, Colin Farrell, Jim Sturgess and Cee Lo Green	Cee Lo Green performed "It's OK"	1.75
20 December 2010	2	Michael McIntyre, Stacey Solomon, Shaun Ryder and Cheryl Cole	Cheryl Cole performed "Promise This" and "The Flood"	2.25
26 December 2010	3 (Christmas Special)	Chris Evans, Mickey Rourke, Catherine Tate and The Wanted	The Wanted performed "Lose My Mind"	1.41
2 January 2011	4 (New Years Special)	Matt Lucas, Dame Edna Everage and McFly	McFly performed "Nowhere Left to Run"	1.52
17 January 2011	5	Jonathan Ross, Kevin Bridges, Jack Whitehall and Adele	Adele performed "Rolling in the Deep"	1.55
24 January 2011	6	James Corden, Benedict Cumberbatch, Kerry Katona and Jamiroquai	Jamiroquai performed "Lifeline"	1.35
31 January 2011	7	Billie Piper, Usher, Russell Tovey, Lenora Crichlow, Sinead Keenan and Duran Duran	Duran Duran performed "All You Need Is Now"	1.38
7 February 2011	8	Juliette Lewis, Dermot O'Leary, Miranda Hart and The Streets	The Streets performed "Going Through Hell"	1.54
14 February 2011	9	Samuel L. Jackson, Lee Mack and JLS	JLS performed "Eyes Wide Shut"	1.42
21 February 2011	10	Jo Brand, Tom Hardy, Amy Childs, Mark Wright, Sam Faiers, James Argent, Nanny Pat and Ellie Goulding	Ellie Goulding performed "Lights"	1.33

=== Series 6 ===
Series 6 moved to Friday nights beginning on 17 June 2011.

Date	Episode number	Guests	Performance	Ratings (millions)
17 June 2011	1	Jonathan Ross, David Haye and Jennifer Lopez	Jennifer Lopez performed "I'm into You"	1.78
24 June 2011	2	Elle Macpherson, Bruce Forsyth, Louis Walsh, Wonderland and Kaiser Chiefs	Kaiser Chiefs performed "Little Shocks"	1.40
1 July 2011	3	Thandie Newton, Ben Miller, Jo Frost, Liam Gallagher and Beady Eye	Beady Eye performed "The Beat Goes On"	1.53
8 July 2011	4	Eddie Izzard, Chris Moyles, Prof. Brian Cox and Hard-Fi	Hard-Fi performed	1.81
15 July 2011	5	Matt Smith, David, Taylor Ann and Hayley Hasselhoff, JLS and Miles Kane	Miles Kane performed "Inhaler"	1.63
22 July 2011	6	Mathew Horne, Denise Welch, Sherrie Hewson, Carol McGiffin, Charlie Day, Jason Bateman, Jason Sudeikis and The Kooks	The Kooks performed "Is It Me"	1.58
29 July 2011	7	Bradley Cooper, Stephen Merchant, One Direction and Will Young	Will Young performed "Jealousy"	1.67
5 August 2011	8	Justin Timberlake, Mila Kunis, Simon Bird, Joe Thomas, James Buckley, Blake Harrison and Jessie J	Jessie J performed "Who's Laughing Now"	1.85

=== Series 7 ===
Series 7 moved back to Sunday nights beginning on 30 October.

Date	Episode number	Guests	Performance	Ratings (millions)
30 October 2011	1	Nicole Scherzinger, Simon Pegg, Nick Frost and Matt Cardle	Matt Cardle performed "Letters"	1.80
6 November 2011	2	Dermot O'Leary, David Walliams, Westlife, Mary J. Blige and The Saturdays	The Saturdays performed "My Heart Takes Over"	1.14
13 November 2011	3	Louis Walsh, Gary Barlow, Tulisa Contostavlos, Kelly Rowland, Terry Wogan, Tinie Tempah and Kasabian	Kasabian performed "Re-Wired"	1.28
20 November 2011	4	Dannii Minogue, Peter Kay and Lady Gaga	Lady Gaga performed "Marry The Night"	1.39
27 November 2011	5	Lee Evans, Bear Grylls and One Direction	One Direction performed "What Makes You Beautiful"	1.10
4 December 2011	6	Ricky Gervais, Warwick Davis, Vernon Kay, Alesha Dixon, Craig Revel Horwood, Bruno Tonioli and Ed Sheeran	Ed Sheeran performed "Lego House"	1.24
25 December 2011	7 (Christmas Special)	David Walliams, Ruth Jones, Jedward and Steps	Steps performed a medley of "One for Sorrow", "Deeper Shade of Blue" and "Tragedy"	1.78

=== Series 8 ===
Series 8 began on 27 April 2012.

Date	Episode number	Guests	Performance	Ratings (millions)
27 April 2012	1	The Saturdays, Jimmy Carr, Tulisa Contostavlos and Paul Weller	Paul Weller performed "The Attic"	1.98
4 May 2012	2	Eddie Izzard, David Walliams, Amanda Holden, Mark Francis, Millie Mackintosh, Ollie Locke, Francesca Hull, Jamie Laing, Morgana Robinson, Terry Mynott and Gossip	Gossip performed "Move in the Right Direction"	1.71
11 May 2012	3	Supreme Leader Admiral General Aladeen of Wadiya, Ray Winstone, Phillip Schofield, Holly Willoughby and Rebecca Ferguson	Rebecca Ferguson performed "Glitter & Gold"	1.91
18 May 2012	4	Ashleigh and Pudsey, Kim Kardashian, Sean Lock, Jon Richardson, Dr. Christian Jessen, Dr. Dawn Harper and Nelly Furtado	Nelly Furtado performed "Big Hoops"	1.72
25 May 2012	5	John Bishop, Cuba Gooding Jr., will.i.am and Plan B	Plan B performed "iLL Manors"	1.70
1 June 2012	6	Michael McIntyre, Kylie Minogue, Little Mix and Kaiser Chiefs	Kaiser Chiefs performed "I Predict a Riot"	2.00

=== Series 9 ===
The ninth series of the show premiered on Friday 14 September 2012 for a 14-episode run.

Date	Episode number	Guests	Performance	Ratings (millions)
14 September 2012	1	Gok Wan, Adam Hills, David Weir, Ellie Simmonds, Alex Brooker, Jody Cundy and Pink	Pink performed "Blow Me (One Last Kiss)"	2.09
21 September 2012	2	Matt Smith, Kelly Osbourne, Jack Whitehall, Greg McHugh, Joe Thomas, Zawe Ashton, Charlotte Ritchie, Kimberley Nixon, Jonnie Peacock and Example.	Example performed "Say Nothing"	1.76
28 September 2012	3	Jessie J, One Direction, Kevin McCloud and Alicia Keys	Alicia Keys performed "New Day"	1.63
5 October 2012	4	Paddy McGuinness, Theo Paphitis, Deborah Meaden, Peter Jones, Kimberley Walsh, Nicky Byrne, Louis Smith, Jerry Hall and Conor Maynard	Conor Maynard performed "Turn Around"	1.37
12 October 2012	5	Cheryl Cole, Dara Ó Briain, McFly and Leona Lewis	Leona Lewis performed "Trouble"	2.15
26 October 2012	6	Chris O'Dowd, Kelly Brook and JLS	JLS performed "Hottest Girl in the World"	1.49
2 November 2012	7	Nicki Minaj, Sophie McShera, Rob James-Collier, Ed Speleers, Gary Barlow, Tulisa Contostavlos, Nicole Scherzinger and Paloma Faith	Paloma Faith performed "Never Tear Us Apart"	2.27
9 November 2012	8	Jamie Oliver, Jimmy Doherty, Taylor Swift, The Wanted and The Killers	The Killers performed "Miss Atomic Bomb"	1.64
16 November 2012	9	Julia Davis, John Bishop, Melanie C, Emma Bunton, Geri Halliwell and Rita Ora	Rita Ora performed "Shine Ya Light"	1.23
23 November 2012	10	Rhod Gilbert, Paul O'Grady and Noel Gallagher	Noel Gallagher performed "AKA... What a Life!"	1.75
30 November 2012	11	Kevin Bridges, Dermot O'Leary, David Walliams and Lawson	Lawson performed "Taking Over Me"	1.13
7 December 2012	12	Michael McIntyre, Keith Lemon, will.i.am and Daley feat. Jessie J	Daley feat. Jessie J performed "Remember Me"	1.59
14 December 2012	13	Davina McCall, Harry Hill, Jon Richardson, Olly Murs and Rebecca Ferguson	Rebecca Ferguson performed "Shoulder to Shoulder"	1.88
21 December 2012	14	Gordon Ramsay, Ian McKellen, Miranda Hart and Kylie Minogue	Kylie Minogue performed "Come into My World"	1.09
25 December 2012	15 (Christmas Special)	JLS, David Walliams, Hilary Devey and McFly	McFly performed "Greatest Hits Medley/Rockin' Robin"	2.03

=== Series 10 ===
The tenth series of the show premiered on 1 March 2013 and ran for twelve episodes.

Date	Episode number	Guests	Performance	Ratings (millions)
1 March 2013	1	Jaime Winstone, Sue Perkins, Jack Dee, Melanie C, Dara Ó Briain and Robbie Williams	Robbie Williams performed "Be a Boy"	1.72
8 March 2013	2	Ant & Dec, Joanna Lumley, Rylan Clark and The Vaccines	The Vaccines performed "Bad Mood"	1.70
22 March 2013	3	Ryan Reynolds, Gregg Wallace, John Torode and The Saturdays feat. Sean Paul	The Saturdays feat. Sean Paul performed "What About Us"	1.58
29 March 2013	4	Russell Brand, Jools Holland, Terry Mynott and Tom Odell	Tom Odell performed "Hold Me"	1.59
12 April 2013	5	Brian Cox, Anna Friel, Paul Gascoigne and Fall Out Boy	Fall Out Boy performed "My Songs Know What You Did in the Dark"	1.84
19 April 2013	6	Bill Bailey, Jennifer Saunders, Charlie Brooks and Fun	Fun performed "All Alone"	1.44
26 April 2013	7	Sarah Millican, Danny Dyer, JLS and Laura Mvula	Laura Mvula performed "That's Alright"	1.78
3 May 2013	8	Bruce Forsyth, Steve Coogan, Jo Brand, Seann Walsh and Little Mix	Little Mix performed "How Ya Doin'?"	1.30
10 May 2013	9	David Gandy, Amanda Holden, Rob Brydon and Jessie Ware	Jessie Ware performed "Imagine It Was Us"	1.41
17 May 2013	10	Rod Stewart, Dawn O'Porter, Ollie Locke, Jamie Laing, Francis Boulle, Binky Felstead, Lucy Watson, Andy Jordan and Miles Kane	Miles Kane performed "Don't Forget Who You Are"	1.18
24 May 2013	11	Zach Galifianakis, Ken Jeong, Ed Helms, Helen Flanagan, Stephen Graham and Olly Murs	Olly Murs performed "Dear Darlin'"	1.54
31 May 2013	12	Clare Balding, Demi Lovato, Danny O'Donoghue, Tom Jones and Mark Owen	Mark Owen performed "Stars"	1.56

=== Series 11 ===
The eleventh series of the show began on 30 August 2013. The show celebrated its 100th episode on 27 September 2013.

Date	Episode number	Guests	Performance	Ratings (millions)
30 August 2013	1	Lee Evans, Keeley Hawes, Deborah Meaden, Peter Jones, Duncan Bannatyne, Kelly Hoppen, Sharon Osbourne and Rizzle Kicks	Rizzle Kicks performed "Lost Generation"	1.33
6 September 2013	2	David Walliams, Kirstie Allsopp, Phil Spencer, Channing Tatum, Jamie Foxx and Mutya Keisha Siobhan	Mutya Keisha Siobhan performed "Flatline"	1.19
13 September 2013	3	Sean Lock, Mel Giedroyc, Sue Perkins and Miley Cyrus	Miley Cyrus performed "We Can't Stop"	1.65
20 September 2013	4 (80s Special)	Matthew Fox, Suggs, Jools Holland and Jessie J	Jessie J performed "It's My Party"	1.87
27 September 2013	5 (100th episode Special)	David Haye, Rihanna and Justin Timberlake	Rihanna performed "What Now"; Justin Timberlake performed "Take Back the Night"	1.84
4 October 2013	6	David Mitchell, James McAvoy, Tess Daly, Abbey Clancy, Sophie Ellis-Bextor, Julien McDonald, Ben Cohen and Iggy Azalea	Iggy Azalea performed "Change Your Life"	1.57
11 October 2013	7	Gok Wan, Johnny Knoxville, Nicole Scherzinger and OneRepublic	OneRepublic performed "Counting Stars"	1.57
18 October 2013	8	Mo Farah, Joseph Gordon-Levitt, Britney Spears and Jake Bugg	Jake Bugg performed "What Doesn't Kill You"	1.50
25 October 2013	9	Amanda Holden, Karl Pilkington, Michael Sheen, Jared Leto and Icona Pop	Icona Pop performed a medley of "I Love It" and "All Night"	1.19
1 November 2013	10	Tom Hiddleston, Joan Collins, James Corden and Tinie Tempah feat. John Martin	Tinie Tempah feat. John Martin performed "Children of the Sun"	1.36
8 November 2013	11	Paul O'Grady, Jack Whitehall, Michael Whitehall and Robin Thicke	Robin Thicke performed "Give It 2 U"	1.37
15 November 2013	12	Russell Brand, Derren Brown, Adam Hills and The Wanted	The Wanted performed "We Own the Night"	1.32
22 November 2013	13	Micky Flanagan, Sheridan Smith, Spencer Matthews, Mark-Francis Vandelli Orlov-Romanovsky, Binky Felstead, Lucy Watson, Andy Jordan and Bastille	Bastille performed "Of the Night"	1.29
29 November 2013	14	Josh Widdicombe, Nick Grimshaw, Russell Tovey, Louis Walsh and Beady Eye	Beady Eye performed "Iz Rite"	1.50
6 December 2013	15	Heston Blumenthal, John Bishop and Lady Gaga	Lady Gaga performed "Dope" and "Do What U Want"	—N/a
13 December 2013	16	Seann Walsh, Keith Lemon and Michael Bublé	Michael Bublé performed "You Make Me Feel So Young"	1.28
20 December 2013	17	Bruce Forsyth, Lee Mack and Katy Perry	Katy Perry performed "Unconditionally"	—N/a
25 December 2013	18 (Christmas Special)	Davina McCall, Russell Brand, David Dickinson and Little Mix	Little Mix performed "Little Me"	1.06

=== Series 12 ===
The twelfth series began on 28 March 2014.

Date	Episode number	Guests	Performance	Ratings (millions)
28 March 2014	1	Jessica Hynes, Ricky Gervais, Kermit the Frog, Constantine and Gary Barlow	Gary Barlow performed "Since I Saw You Last"	1.94
4 April 2014	2 (Grand National Special)	will.i.am, Ruth Jones, Frankie Dettori and Enrique Iglesias	Enrique Iglesias performed "I'm a Freak"	1.90
11 April 2014	3	Noel Edmonds, Jennifer Saunders, Amanda Holden, Alesha Dixon, David Walliams and The Vamps	The Vamps performed "Last Night"	1.78
18 April 2014	4	Cameron Diaz, Leslie Mann, Kate Upton, Paul Hollywood, Paddy McGuinness and Katy B	Katy B performed "Still"	1.73
25 April 2014	5	Martin Freeman, Lindsay Lohan, Dr. Christian Jessen and The Kooks	The Kooks performed "Around Town"	1.77
2 May 2014	6	Frank Skinner, Heston Blumenthal, Seb Cardinal and Dustin Demri-Burns and Paloma Faith	Paloma Faith performed "Only Love Can Hurt Like This"	1.71
9 May 2014	7	John Torode, Gregg Wallace, Courtney Love and Lily Allen	Lily Allen performed "Our Time"	1.69
16 May 2014	8	Nick Grimshaw, Sir Ian McKellen and Kylie Minogue	Kylie Minogue performed "I Was Gonna Cancel"	1.48
23 May 2014	9	Richard Ayoade, Mary Portas, John Cleese and Ellie Goulding	Ellie Goulding performed "Beating Heart"	1.43
30 May 2014	10	Adam Hills, Amanda Seyfried, Keith Lemon, Jason Biggs, Taylor Schilling, Danielle Brooks, Laura Prepon and Foxes	Foxes performed "Let Go for Tonight"	1.27
6 June 2014	11	Kevin Bridges, Carrie Fisher, Channing Tatum, Jonah Hill and Example	Example performed "One More Day (Stay with Me)"	1.31
13 June 2014	12	Phillip Schofield, Cher Lloyd, Pharrell Williams and Nicole Scherzinger	Nicole Scherzinger performed "Your Love"	1.53
25 July 2014	13 (Summer Special)	Miranda Hart, Vin Diesel, Simon Bird, Joe Thomas, James Buckley, Blake Harrison, Noel Fielding, Kevin McHale and Rizzle Kicks	Rizzle Kicks performed "Tell Her" and "Down with the Trumpets"	1.65

=== Series 13 ===
The thirteenth series began on 12 September 2014.

Date	Episode number	Guests	Performance	Ratings (millions)
12 September 2014	1	Piers Morgan, Jon Richardson, Matt Forde, Abbey Clancy, Jack Whitehall and Kasabian	Kasabian performed "bumblebeee"	1.90
19 September 2014	2	Dan Aykroyd, Kate Hudson, Zach Braff, Lee Mack and Professor Green	Professor Green performed "Little Secrets"	1.85
26 September 2014	3	Jessie J, Nick Grimshaw, Lionel Richie, Billy Howle, Jessie Cave, Jordan Stephens, Charlotte Spencer and Ella Eyre	Ella Eyre performed "Comeback"	1.95
3 October 2014	4	Samuel L. Jackson, Pixie Lott, Gregg Wallace, Frankie Bridge, Scott Mills, Caroline Flack, Mark Wright, John Bishop and Ella Henderson	Ella Henderson performed "Glow"	1.15
10 October 2014	5	Hugh Grant, Dr. Christian Jessen, Davina McCall, Noel Fielding and Ariana Grande	Ariana Grande performed "Break Free"	1.35
17 October 2014	6 (Live Special)	John Legend, Nicole Scherzinger, Keith Lemon, Gok Wan, Joey Essex, Laura Whitmore, Ollie Locke, Mel B, Jonathan Ross and Naomi Campbell	—N/a	—N/a
24 October 2014	7	James Nesbitt, Kevin Bridges and Taylor Swift	Taylor Swift performed "Shake It Off"	—N/a
31 October 2014	8	Dermot O'Leary, Elijah Wood, Naomi Campbell and Paloma Faith	Paloma Faith performed "Ready For The Good Life"	1.21
7 November 2014	9	Derren Brown, Sue Perkins, Mel B, Nina Conti and Jungle	Jungle performed "Busy Earnin'"	1.67
14 November 2014	10	Charlie Day, Jason Sudeikis, Gillian Anderson, Russell Howard, Mick Hucknall and Lorde	Lorde performed "Yellow Flicker Beat"	1.10
21 November 2014	11	James Blunt, Bette Midler, Keith Lemon and Sam Smith	Sam Smith performed "Like I Can"	—N/a
28 November 2014	12	Russell Brand, Rafe Spall, Warwick Davis, Jim Broadbent, David Guetta and Kiesza	Kiesza performed "Hideaway"	1.28
5 December 2014	13	Lee Evans, Bruce Forsyth, Richard Hammond, Fleur East, Ben Haenow, Lauren Platt, Andrea Faustini and George Ezra	George Ezra performed "Listen to the Man"	1.05
12 December 2014	14	Stephen Fry, Micky Flanagan, Clare Balding and Gorgon City feat. Jennifer Hudson	Gorgon City feat. Jennifer Hudson performed "Go All Night"	1.31
19 December 2014	15	Greg Davies, Gemma Arterton, Brendan O'Carroll and Tom Odell	Tom Odell performed "Real Love"	1.15
25 December 2014	16 (Christmas Special)	Terry Wogan, Sarah Millican, Dan Stevens, Emma Willis, Phillip Schofield, Gino D'Acampo, Sam Smith, George Ezra and McBusted	Sam Smith performed "Stay With Me"; George Ezra performed "Blame It On Me"; McBusted performed "Get Over It"	1.24

=== Series 14 ===
The fourteenth series began on 20 March 2015.

Date	Episode number	Guests	Performance	Ratings (millions)
20 March 2015	1	Stephanie and Dominic Parker, Antonio Banderas, Tom Jones, will.i.am, Rita Ora, Ricky Wilson and Ella Henderson	Ella Henderson performed "Mirror Man"	2.08
27 March 2015	2	Michelle Keegan, Warwick Davis, Elijah Wood, Troy Von Scheibner and Hudson Taylor	Hudson Taylor performed "Chasing Rubies"	1.60
3 April 2015	3	Frank Lampard, Noel Fielding, Denise van Outen and Lethal Bizzle	Lethal Bizzle performed "Fester Skank"	1.67
10 April 2015	4 (Grand National Special)	Russell Brand, Maisie Williams, Gok Wan, Nick Luck and Nick Jonas	Nick Jonas performed "Jealous"	1.39
17 April 2015	5	Paddy McGuinness, Ben Miller, Sarah Hadland, Taraji P. Henson, Gregg Wallace, John Torode and The Maccabees	The Maccabees performed "Marks to Prove It"	1.38
24 April 2015	6	Kirstie Allsopp, Phil Spencer, Stephen Mangan, Aaron Taylor-Johnson, Paul Bettany, Charles Hamilton feat. Rita Ora	Charles Hamilton feat. Rita Ora performed "New York Raining"	1.32
1 May 2015	7	Adam Hills, Alex Brooker, Josh Widdicombe, Will Mellor, Alexandra Roach, Paul Ritter and Noel Gallagher's High Flying Birds	Noel Gallagher's High Flying Birds performed "Riverman"	1.57
8 May 2015	8	Lee Mack, Anna Kendrick, Danny Dyer and Clean Bandit feat. Alex Newell and Sean Bass	Clean Bandit feat. Alex Newell and Sean Bass performed "Stronger"	1.50
15 May 2015	9	Phillip Schofield, Romesh Ranganathan, Billie Piper and Charli XCX	Charli XCX performed "Famous"	1.24
22 May 2015	10	Amanda Holden, Alesha Dixon, Reece Shearsmith, Steve Pemberton, Nick Grimshaw and The Vaccines	The Vaccines performed "Dream Lover"	1.11
29 May 2015	11	RuPaul, David Gandy, Caroline Flack and Maroon 5	Maroon 5 performed "Sugar"	0.88
5 June 2015	12	Peter Kay, Adam Lambert, Ellie Kemper and James Bay	James Bay performed "Hold Back the River"	1.26
12 June 2015	13	Jeremy Piven, Adrian Grenier, Kevin Dillon, Kevin Connolly, Jerry Ferrara, Samuel L. Jackson, Tom Goodman-Hill, Gemma Chan, Katherine Parkinson and Mark Ronson feat. Keyone Starr	Mark Ronson feat. Keyone Starr performed "I Can't Lose"	0.98

=== Series 15 ===
The fifteenth series began on 11 September 2015.

Date	Episode number	Guests	Performance	Ratings (millions)
11 September 2015	1	Tom Hardy, Stephen Graham, Thomas Turgoose, Vicky McClure and Demi Lovato	Demi Lovato performed "Cool for the Summer"	1.48
18 September 2015	2	Drew Barrymore, Toni Collette, Keith Lemon, Will Young and Carly Rae Jepsen	Carly Rae Jepsen performed "Run Away with Me"	1.37
25 September 2015	3	Kristen Wiig, Kate Mara, Chiwetel Ejiofor, Claudia Winkleman, Tess Daly and Selena Gomez	Selena Gomez performed "Good for You"	1.18
2 October 2015	4	Sarah Millican, Gareth Malone, Alesha Dixon, Gareth Thomas and Morrissey	Morrissey performed "Kiss Me a Lot"	1.21
9 October 2015	5 (Stand Up 2 Cancer Special)	Jonathan Ross, Thomas Turgoose, Jay Hutton, Jamie Laing, Fred Sirieix, Sue Perkins and 5 Seconds of Summer	5 Seconds of Summer performed "Hey Everybody!"	1.46
16 October 2015	6	Sharon Horgan, Rob Delaney, Catherine Tate, Adam Lambert and Róisín Murphy	Róisín Murphy performed "Evil Eyes"	1.34
23 October 2015	7	Romesh Ranganathan, Shanti Ranganathan, Goldie Hawn, Katherine Ryan, Ricky Wilson and Rudimental	Rudimental performed "Lay It All on Me"	1.40
30 October 2015	8	Jason Manford, Andrew Scott, Nick Grimshaw, Yvette Fielding and Years & Years	Years & Years performed "Eyes Shut"	1.19
6 November 2015	9	Bradley Cooper, Sienna Miller, Noel Fielding and Justin Bieber	Justin Bieber performed "What Do You Mean?"	1.38
13 November 2015	10	Richard Osman, Dawn French, Russell Howard and Little Mix	Little Mix performed "Love Me Like You"	1.12
20 November 2015	11	Danny Dyer, Josh Widdicombe, Rita Ora and Fleur East	Fleur East performed "Sax"	1.00
27 November 2015	12	Helen George, Georgia May Foote, Kellie Bright, Jay McGuiness, Anita Rani, Grace Jones, Rob Beckett and Olly Murs	Olly Murs performed "Kiss Me"	—N/a
4 December 2015	13	Dara Ó Briain, Julia Davis, Alex Macqueen, Holly Willoughby, Joe Sugg, Caspar Lee and Grace	Grace performed "You Don't Own Me"	1.20
11 December 2015	14	Karl Pilkington, Lady Colin Campbell and One Direction	One Direction performed "History"	2.11
18 December 2015	15	Gwendoline Christie, Tina Fey, Kevin Bridges, Anthony Daniels and Lion Babe	Lion Babe performed "Where Do We Go"	1.22
25 December 2015	16 (Christmas Special)	John Bishop, Stephanie and Dominic Parker, Samuel L. Jackson, Nan, Emma Willis, Marvin Humes, Keith Lemon, Lorraine Kelly, Little Mix and One Direction	Little Mix performed "Black Magic"; One Direction performed "Drag Me Down"	1.24

=== Series 16 ===
The sixteenth series moved to Thursday nights and began airing on 3 March 2016. It was then announced that Series 16 would be the final series of Chatty Man.

Date	Episode number	Guests	Performance	Ratings (millions)
3 March 2016	1	Matthew Perry, Caitlin Moran, Rebekah Staton, Alexa Davies, Helen Monks, Molly Risker, Phillip Schofield and The 1975	The 1975 performed "The Sound"	
10 March 2016	2	Stephen Mangan, David Coulthard, Steve Jones and Rod Stewart	Rod Stewart performed "Hold the Line"	
17 March 2016	3	Steve Coogan, Rob Delaney, Michael Socha, Michaela Coel and All Saints	All Saints performed "One Strike"	
24 March 2016	4	will.i.am, Paloma Faith, Ricky Wilson, Boy George, Jack Whitehall, Charlotte Ritchie, Joe Thomas, Greg McHugh and Years & Years	Years & Years performed "Desire"	
31 March 2016	5	Jimmy Carr, Will Arnett, Ariana Grande and Izzy Bizu	Izzy Bizu performed "Give Me Love"	
7 April 2016	6 (Grand National Special)	Jamie Oliver, Amanda Holden, Alesha Dixon, Goedele Liekens, Nick Luck and Fifth Harmony	Fifth Harmony performed "Work from Home"	
14 April 2016	7	Eddie Izzard, Jon Favreau, Romesh Ranganathan, Seann Walsh and Shawn Mendes	Shawn Mendes performed "Stitches"	
21 April 2016	8	Michael McIntyre, Naomi Campbell, Scarlett Moffatt and Jack Garratt	Jack Garratt performed "Surprise Yourself"	
28 April 2016	9	Hugh Grant, Simon Helberg, Elizabeth Olsen, Anthony Mackie, Paul Bettany, Piers Morgan, Susanna Reid and Laura Mvula	Laura Mvula performed "Phenomenal Woman"	
5 May 2016	10	Maisie Williams, Anna Friel, Nick Grimshaw and Alessia Cara	Alessia Cara performed "Here"	

=== Christmas special (2016) ===
It was announced on 9 October 2016 that Chatty Man had been cancelled after Series 16 due to low ratings. It was then confirmed that there would be a Christmas Day special.

Date	Guests	Performances	Ratings (millions)
25 December 2016	Tom Hardy, Scarlett Moffatt, Martin Kemp, Dannii Minogue, Gary Barlow, Robbie Williams, Matt Terry, Tom Daley, Mads Mikkelsen, Diego Luna, Ben Mendelsohn, Riz Ahmed, Chris Steed, Stephen Webb and Emeli Sandé	Robbie Williams featuring Guy Chambers performed "Love My Life"; Emeli Sandé performed "Hurts"	

=== Christmas special (2017) ===
A Christmas special of Chatty Man aired on 25 December 2017.

Date	Guests	Performances	Ratings (millions)
25 December 2017	Giles Wood, Mary Killen, Noel Gallagher, Christian Slater, Lorraine Kelly, Rob Beckett, John Bishop, Dua Lipa, Adam Lambert and Kasabian	Dua Lipa; Adam Lambert; Kasabian	
