= Everything I Didn't Say =

Studio album by Ella Henderson
- Released: 11 March 2022
- Recorded: 2016–2021
- Studio: Beam Me Up (Brighton); Biffco; BLNK (Stockholm, Sweden); Breakfast (London); Cotton Eye; Church; Decoy; Hectic (London); Metropolis (London); MXM (Los Angeles); Sarm Music Village (UK); The Baking House; The Church (London); The MixSuite; The Music Shed (London); The Spaceship (UK & USA); TileYard (London); RAK (London); Studio 13; Wired Masters (UK)
- Genre: Pop
- Length: 50:39 (standard); 74:36 (deluxe)
- Label: Major Tom's; Asylum
- Producer: Biff & Bubba; Johan Carlsson; Ollie Green; Tre Jean-Marie; Mike Kintish; Steve Manovski; Medium; Mac & Phil; Jordan Riley; Toby Scott; Al Shux; TMS

Ella Henderson chronology
| Chapter One (2014) | Everything I Didn't Say (2022) |

Singles from Everything I Didn't Say
- 1. "Let's Go Home Together" Released: 19 February 2021; 2. "Brave" Released: 7 January 2022

Everything I Didn't Say is the second studio album by English singer and songwriter Ella Henderson. It was released on 11 March 2022 by Major Tom's and Asylum Records, marking Henderson's first full-length album since her 2014 debut Chapter One. Originally scheduled for release in 2016, Henderson would leave her then record label Syco Records, citing creative differences. After a period of ill health, and signing a new deal with Major Tom's, Henderson would release several standalone songs as well as collaborations with other artists.

Recording for Everything I Didn't Say took place from 2016 through 2021 mostly in London and the UK, but also in Stockholm and Los Angeles, with around 400 songs recorded for consideration. Taking a diary-like approach to the track listing, each song tells an individual story in Henderson's life. Lyrics cover a range of themes including themes of love, heartbreak, mental health and self-discovery, against a musical backdrop of both electronic and traditional instruments. English singer and songwriter Tom Grennan and American singer and songwriter Mikky Ekko are guest appearances on the album, alongside production and co-writing from James Arthur, TMS, Jordan Riley, Al Shux and Richard "Biff" Stannard amongst others.

The album was preceded by the release of the singles "Let's Go Home Together" (with Grennan) and "Brave", as well as the title track, which was released as a promotional single in the countdown to the album's release. "Let's Go Home Together" reached number ten on the UK Singles Chart and was certified Platinum by the British Phonographic Industry.

The album was a commercial success, peaking at number eight on the UK Albums Chart and nine on the Scottish Albums Chart. It marked her second top ten entry and second consecutive album to debut in the top ten on both charts. To promote the album Henderson had the opening slot on Irish band the Script's tour Tales from the Script and embarked on her own eight-date UK concert tour across October 2022, both in support of Everything I Didn't Say. The following month, Henderson released a deluxe version of the album, Everything I Didn't Say and More which included singles and collaborations from the last few years including Henderson's 2022 UK top ten singles "Crazy What Love Can Do" (with Becky Hill and David Guetta) and "21 Reasons" (with Nathan Dawe).

== Background ==
Following her UK Singles Chart-topping debut single, "Ghost" in 2014, and the release of the chart-topping debut album, Chapter One (2014), Henderson would take Chapter One on tour in October and November 2015. Before the tour kicked off, in April 2015, it was confirmed that Henderson would begin recording new music with Danny O'Donoghue, lead singer of Irish band the Script, would be recording music with Henderson. This took place less than a year after "Ghost" topped the UK Singles Chart for four weeks and achieved international success. During an interview with the Official Charts Company's George Griffiths, Henderson revealed why there was a big gap between her first and second albums, explaining that part of the gap was due to processing the level of success she had achieved at a young. Henderson said: "I was touring and promoting for so long when I hit my 20s I realised I didn't know where home was. I didn't have a couch, I couldn't drive. I needed to live, which is one of the reasons why I took a step back." Henderson also spoke about crippling anxiety, which included being hospitalised after suffering a panic attack. She told the Evening Standard that she could not release the original iteration of her second album, "I was so lost in terms of who I was as a person that I wasn't ready to release it."

== Recording and production ==
I'm so happy and excited to have signed with an amazing group of artists, musicians, producers and friends. I have been so welcomed over recent months and I am so excited to become a new member of the Major Toms / Asylum family! Rudimental ... have huge hearts and care about the wider community, people and their fans. Having the boys involved in this next chapter of my musical journey makes me SOOOO excited for what's to come!

– 2018 interview with Official Charts Company

According to Henderson, she wrote nearly 400 songs for the album and wanted to compose a diary-like track listing, with each song telling a story and a "different part" of her life. After the album's release, she would explain that she wanted audiences to be "brought up to speed" with everything that had happened since her first album, regardless of whether it was "the good the bad or the ugly [sic]". Sessions took place across various recording studios and locations around the world including in Brighton and London in the UK, Stockholm (Sweden) and some sessions in the United States too. Despite a second album being in production as far back as 2016, in 2018 it was revealed that Henderson had departed ways with her record label Syco Records. The decision was reported by the media to have been mutual, stating that both artist and label "felt that a change of direction was needed for everyone after the gap between the release of the first album and [Ella's] as-yet unreleased follow-up".

It was later revealed, that Henderson and Syco parted ways in 2017 amidst plans for new music. Henderson would subsequently go on to sign a new deal in 2018 with Major Tom's, a record label owned by Amir Amor, an English record producer of British drum and bass band Rudimental, and aligned with Asylum Records. Some of the songs from the original studio sessions for a second album under Syco included "Let's Go Home Together" and "Ugly"; these were subsequently brought across for inclusion on Henderson's album after both had been performed for fans on various tours. Other songs such as "Bones", "Red Roses" and "Hard to Love" were not included on the album despite being performed during various live performances and shows prior to the development of Everything I Didn't Say. At the time, Henderson had been touring with Rudimental which included two sold-out shows at Alexandra Palace.

== Music and lyrics ==
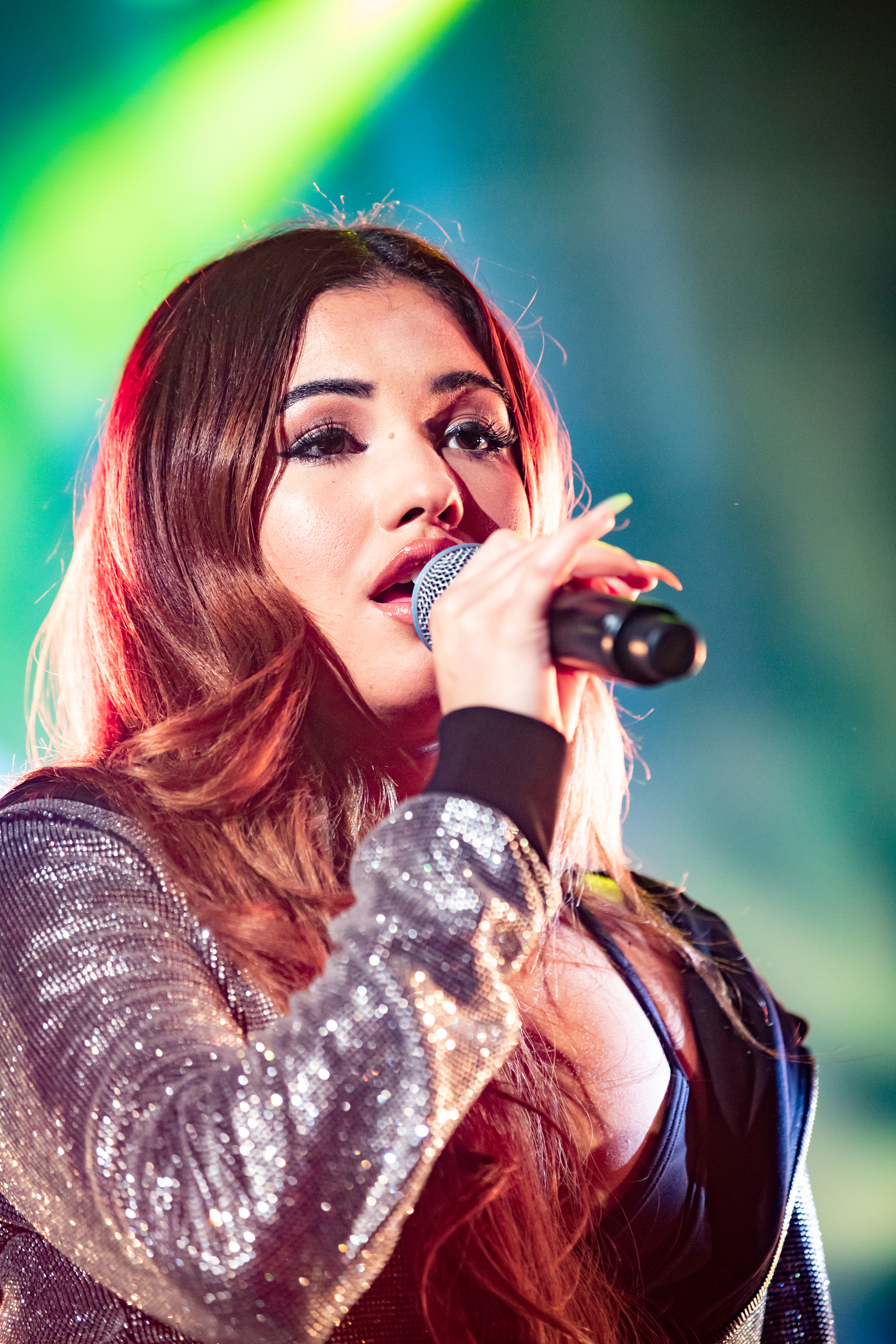
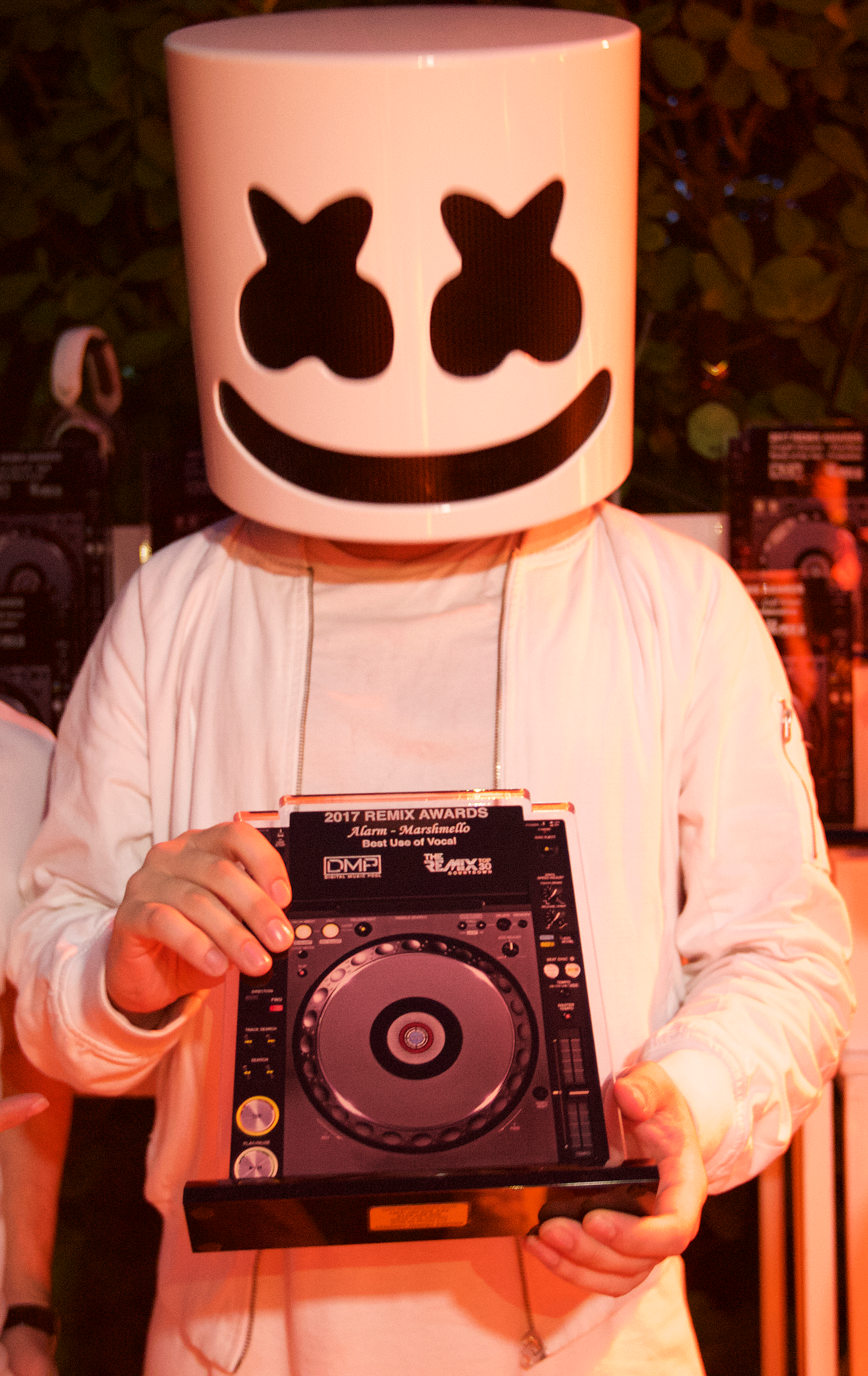
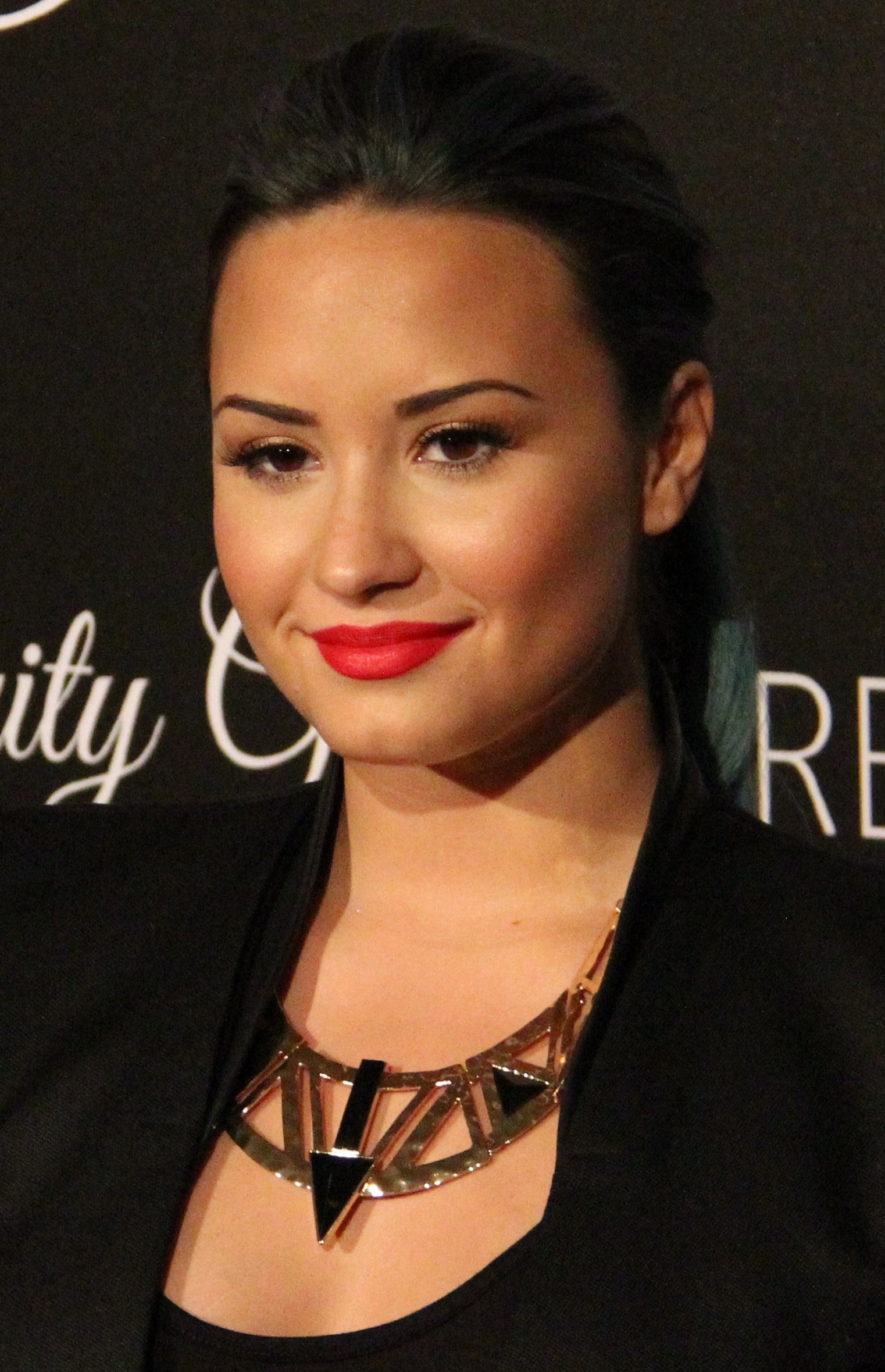
Album opener "Emotions" was likened to songs "OK (Anxiety Anthem)" by Mabel (left) and "OK Not to Be OK" by Marshmello (middle) and Demi Lovato (right)."

Everything I Didn't Say is a pop album with elements of country pop, electropop and soul, combining both electronic and traditional instrumentation such as piano and guitar riffs. Everything I Didn't Say explores themes of Henderson's mental health struggles, the time taken between her first and second album, and the vulnerability of heartbreak, love and self-worth. In a nutshell, Henderson described the album as "how life has been for [her] transitioning from a teenager into a young woman".

The album opener is a song called "Emotions", an upbeat electropop song written by Henderson and Jordan Riley, with the latter also producing the song. Riley would produce and co-write several other songs on the album. Its energetic vibe was described as "setting the tone for Henderson's return to music". Some of the lyrics have a sad tone, such as the chorus "I'm sick of my emotions" and subsequent lyrics "It's okay not to be okay". This latter lyric was compared to the current "self-care climate" in music, drawing similarities to the song "OK (Anxiety Anthem)" by Mabel (2019) and "OK Not to Be OK", a 2020 collaboration between Marshmello and Demi Lovato. "Emotions" and the song "Out of My Head" are two of the up-tempo moments on the album. Henderson described "Out of My Head" as one of her favourite songs on the album as it dealt with themes of narcissism and needing to write about one of the biggest narcissists she had met.

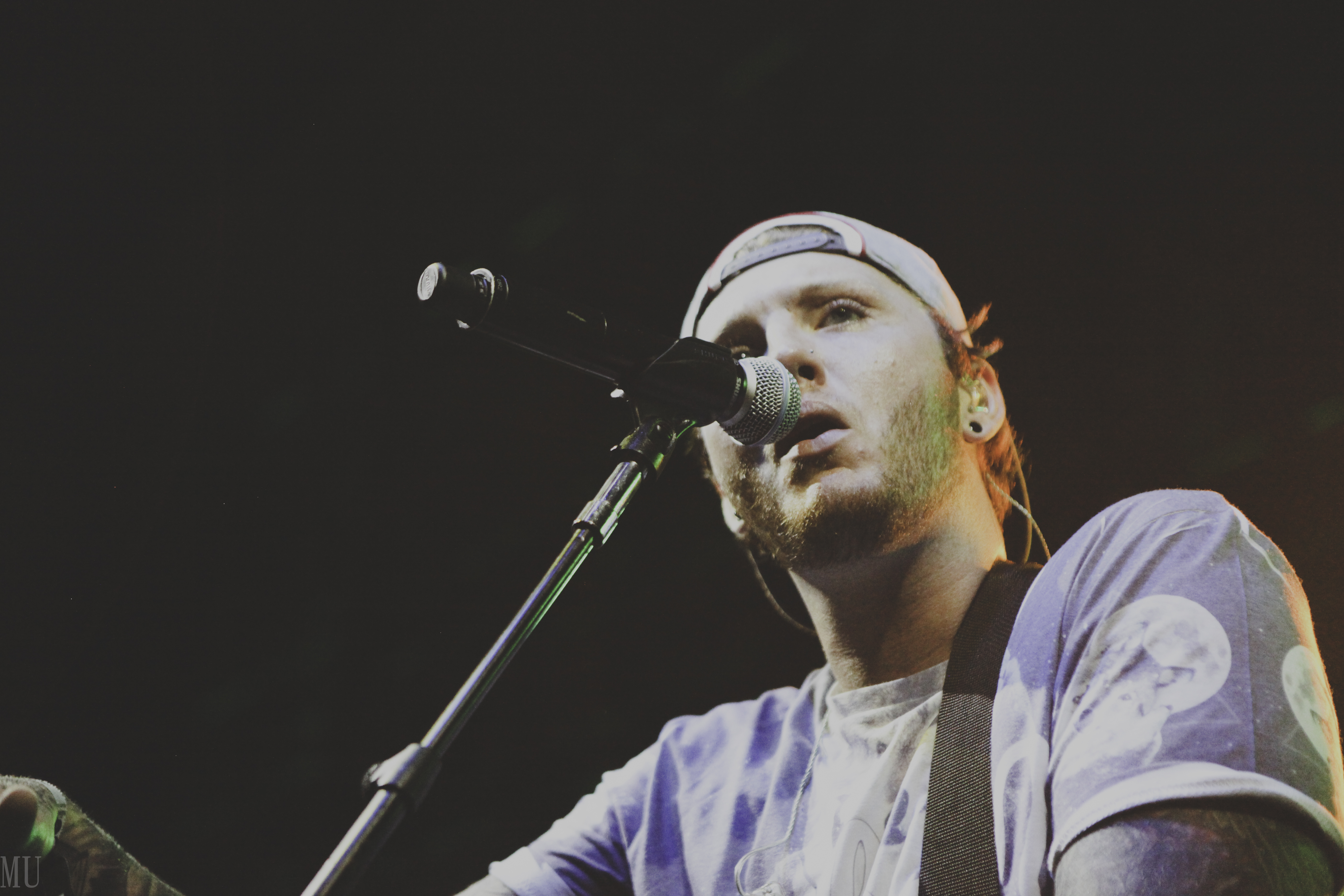
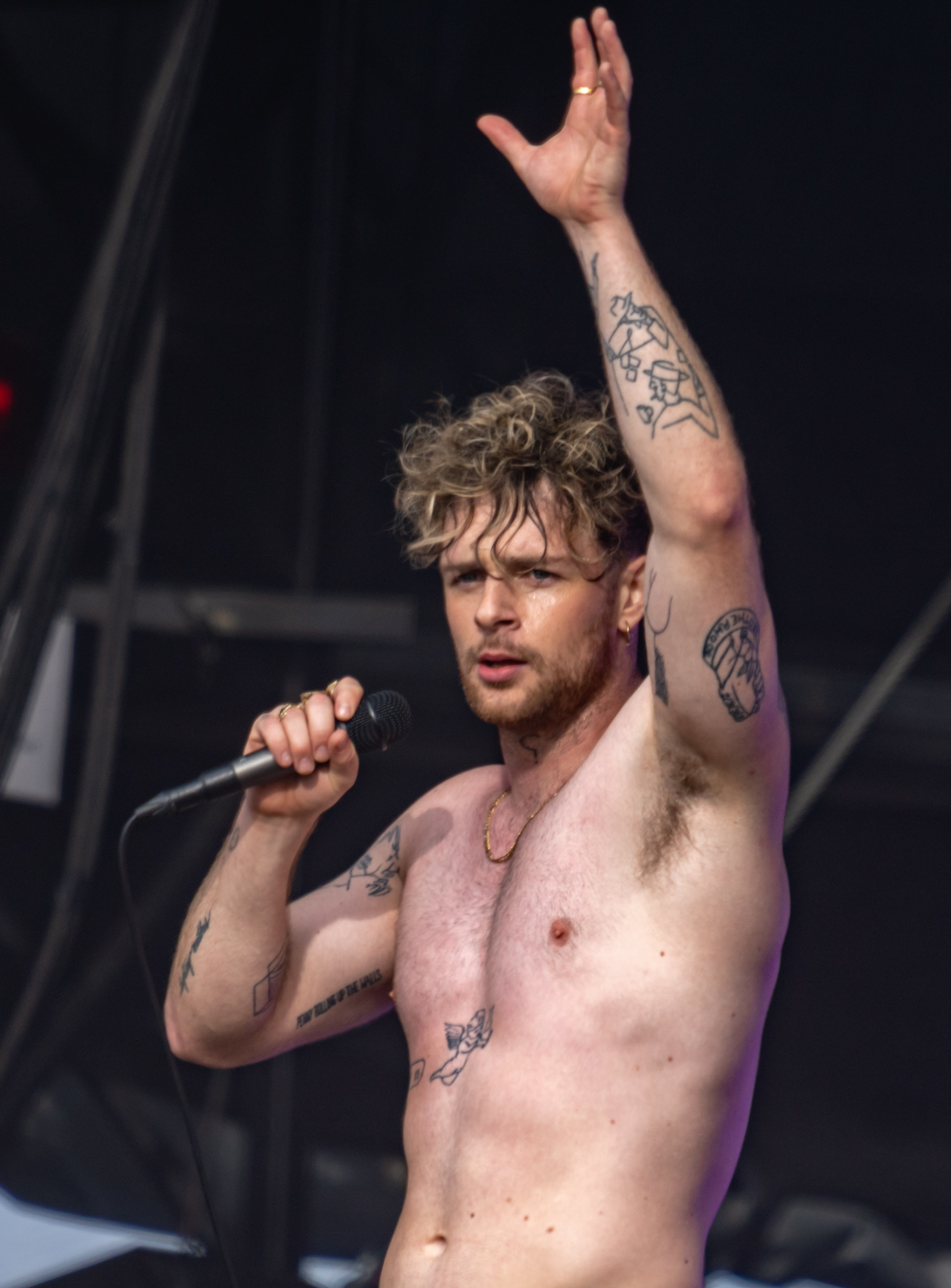
James Arthur (left) co-wrote "Let's Go Home Together" with Henderson. Tom Grennan (right) would re-record vocals for the song to be a duet between Grennan and Henderson.

"Let's Go Home Together" was co-written by fellow The X Factor series nine contestant James Arthur. Originally envisioned as a duet between Arthur and Henderson, the duo performed the song during Arthur's Back from the Edge Tour (2017), for which Henderson was one of the support acts. There were plans for Henderson and Arthur to release the song but over two years neither singers' schedules matched up. Henderson said the song was "so special" and she "kept going back to it", and when asked how Tom Grennan became involved, she said, "Tom and I have been friends for years, I love his voice and I'm so happy we got to do this together." Grennan expressed similar sentiments when he was asked to record the song, "When Ella hit me up and played me this song and then asked me to join her on it, I was absolutely buzzin'. Ella is a good mate, and it's so sick to finally get to sing together!" Producer Ollie Green worked on producing Grennan's vocals at RAK Studios and The Church in London, UK. The new duet between Henderson and Grennan is, included on Everything I Didn't Say. Speaking about the new version, Henderson said "When we released it, it was a time when everyone just missed going to the pub, you know? It helped remind people that we would be together again and you can actually meet someone in a bar and take them home. Seeing that song resonate felt good, I'm going to lie. I had it with me for such a long time!". The lyrics were described as tongue-in-cheek and playful, while the production was guitar and piano driven.

Green also worked with Henderson and Nashville artist Mikky Ekko for the song "Cry on Me", a duet between Henderson and Ekko. The song, along with the single "Brave" were described by the Evening Standard of having themes of "I Will Survive" (akin to the Gloria Gaynor song of the same name). "Brave" has lyrics that speak of "shaking the stigma of needing help and embracing someone's support for you when you need them most". Henderson said that although she wrote the song a few years ago its sentiments really resonated with how she was feeling, "it was therapeutic and I needed it". It was also dedicated to Henderson's friend Paige Dougall, who died a few days before its release.

The song "Set in Stone" includes the lyric "If we lose ourselves at some point, those memories are set in stone", and was written in the UK during a writer's camp. It was inspired by the producer's personal loss (losing their uncle). Of the song, Henderson said, "we always assume that everything is forever until it comes to an end. We have no control over the end, but what we can control is the present. So we should enjoy every minute we have together and get the most out of it." "Ugly" was inspired by an experience Henderson had on holiday and was described as therapeutic for the singer. Having performed the song during live tours, Henderson felt that fans had expected to hear it on a future album and hence it was included on Everything I Didn't Say. Of the song, she said "that came from a situation where I'd gone on a holiday abroad and someone had taken horrible pictures of me. I came home and just stayed in my flat. That song was like a form of therapy for me, it really helped me grow so that had to be on the album". The song sees Henderson singing about embracing her flaws. Other themes explored in the song include "trying to fit in" and being unique.

"Thank You for the Hell", another co-write and production by Riley, is influenced by country pop and tells the story of a situation Henderson went through, reliving all the emotions and toxicity. During an interview with The Rebecca Judd Show on Apple Music, Henderson said of the song, "And this song is when you have gone through the hurt, you've gone through the pain, you've gone through the anger and all these emotions." It discusses the silver lining and Henderson's gratefulness for the situation as it helped her to become the person she is today. In a similar vein, Henderson wrote the title track with producer Mike Kintish, having already decided to call the album Everything I Didn't Say before the song of the same name's conception. Speaking about the piano-led title song, Henderson said, "I loved the idea of creating a piano-led ballad that was coming from the perspective of your own wrongdoings and actually admitting and owning up to your own mistakes within a relationship." Henderson further elaborated that the process for this song felt refreshing due to the vulnerability that comes from "being honest and vulnerable".

== Title and packaging ==
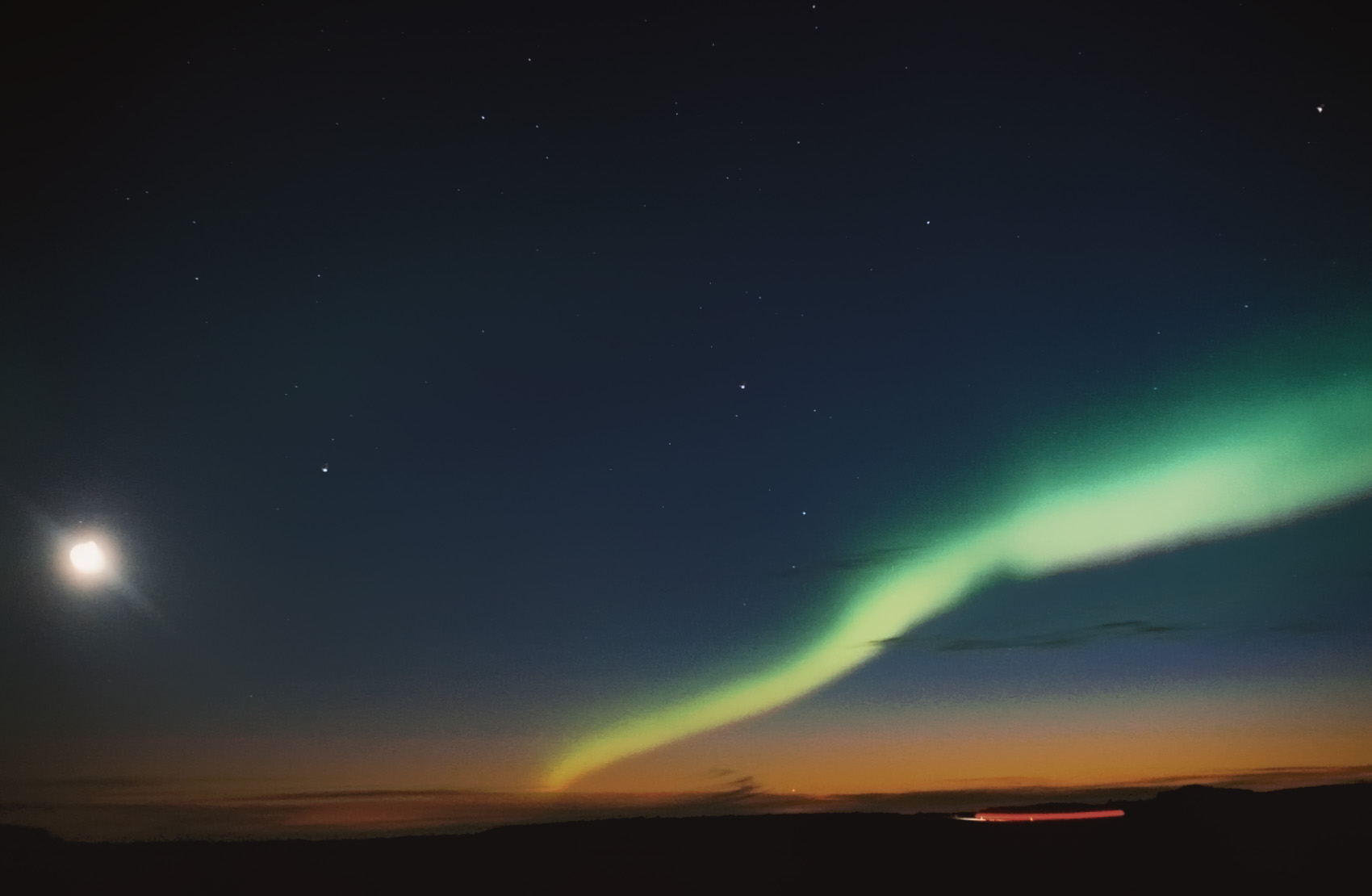
One of the titles considered for the album was Northern Lights, after a song of the same name.

During production for the album, a working title of Chapter Two was considered; it would have made Henderson's second album a direct continuation and sequel to her debut album, Chapter One (2014). During an interview in the run-up to the release of the album, Henderson told the Official Charts Company why she decided against the sequential titles, saying "I wrote Chapter One in 18 months when I was a teenager. This isn't just Chapter Two. This is a whole book! I didn't want to trap myself [in the naming of albums]. I'd be releasing Chapter 85 in my 80s, and no-one wants to see that." During an album listening party with fans and Deezer, Henderson said that she had also considered calling the album Northern Lights, after another song on the album, but was worried that fans would think it was about the Northern lights. During the naming process, Henderson reflected that she spoke a lot of "word vomit" and the album was heavily focused on lyrics. On reflection, "the album is my truth, everything I wanted to say" which led to the title Everything I Didn't Say. Henderson later revealed that she had settled on the title before deciding to create a song that would be titled after the album.

British HMV stores carried an exclusive version of the album with altered artwork; the HMV version features a pink and orange blush background as opposed to the purple background on standard versions of the album. Everything I Didn't Say was released on 11 March 2022 by Major Tom's / Asylum and Warner Music. It was available on CD, Cassette, streaming and digital download formats, as well as part of a number of merchandise bundles including clothing via Henderson's official website music store.

== Release and promotion ==
=== Singles ===
On 19 February 2021, "Let's Go Home Together", Henderson's collaboration with Tom Grennan, was released as the album's first single. It was released for both digital download and streaming. Both the song and music video were influenced by the COVID-19 pandemic, with Henderson confirming this with Hits Radio that it was that "feeling of a night out and the characters you meet at the pub, something that we haven't experienced a lot in the last year." Official remixes of the song by Luca Schreiner, Charlie Hedges and Eddie Craig, MOTi, Majestic, and Madasim were also released in promotion of the song. Further to this, an acoustic stripped version and bilingual version of "Let's Go Home Together" in French and English was released with French singer Alliel, titled "On Se Comprend Sans Parler". "Let's Go Home Together" reached number 10 on the UK Singles Chart and number 11 on the Irish Singles Chart. On 15 October 2021, the single received a platinum certification by the British Phonographic Industry (BPI) for sales of 600,000 units (including unit sales and streaming). In April 2022, "Let's Go Home Together" was nominated for an Ivor Novello Award for the Best Song Musically and Lyrically at the 2022 Ivor Novello Awards.

On 3 January 2022, Henderson started teasing a new single, which was unveiled four days later to be called "Brave". On 7 January 2022, "Brave" was released alongside its music video, the album's title and the announcement that Everything I Didn't Say would be released on 11 March 2022. The music video depicts "a struggling single mother fights to keep her and her toddler son going every day". "Brave" was dedicated to Henderson's friend Paige Dougall, who died a day before its release. It peaked at number 40 on the New Zealand Hot Singles chart and 42 on the UK Singles Chart.

=== Other songs ===
During the countdown to the album, the title song "Everything I Didn't Say" was released to digital outlets a week before the album. A recorded acoustic performance was also released the same day to Henderson's YouTube page. On 25 March 2022, a week after the album's release, Henderson released an extended play (EP) Ugly (acoustic). The EP features three acoustic versions of "Ugly", "Brave" and "Everything I Didn't Say". A week later, the Madism remix of "Ugly", alongside the acoustic and album versions, was also released.

=== Appearances and live performances ===
Henderson and Grennan appeared together to perform "Let's Go Home Together" on its day of release on The Graham Norton Show on 19 February 2021. The duo also performed the song together on The One Show on 26 March 2021. Later on 2 April 2021, Henderson appeared on Irish radio station iRadio, where she spoke about the collaboration and how it came about with Grennan. In January 2022, Henderson made an appearance on Kent radio station, KMFM to promote the song "Brave" and album. Henderson was also invited aboard Virgin Voyages' new cruise liner, performing a set in support of the travel operator's newest ship on 25 February 2022. On 16 March 2022, Henderson joined Jess Iszatt for a conversation about the making of Everything I Didn't Say on Iszatt's show The Record Club. During the programme, Henderson also answered live questions from fans. Henderson appeared on BBC Radio 2's Piano Room over the weekend of 12–13 March 2022. Henderson also appeared on Johannesburg's radio station 702 on 2 April, via video link, to talk about the album and promote its release.

== Critical reception ==
Professional ratings
Review scores
| Source | Rating |
|---|---|
| Evening Standard | 3/5 stars |
| GSGM | 5/5 stars |

Evening Standard's David Smyth praised Henderson's "still might voice" and "vulnerability" across the record, calling songs like "Brave" and "Cry On Me" anthems but remarked that the "mature pop sound" might not be "enough to carve out her own space in crowded territory" but regardless, "plenty of people will be rooting for her to succeed again". Writing for Riff Magazine, Domenic Strazzabosco gave the album a positive review, complimenting Henderson's vocals, saying "Everything I Didn't Say retains the strong vocal work that brought her to attention in the first place. But that's balanced with a more mature production style and lyrical outlook on what cards life can deal you". Strazzabosco also praised the songwriting, concluding that "Henderson taking her time to compose her second record, she effectively avoids a sophomore slump by putting her vocals at the forefront and reminding us why we first paid attention to her 10 years ago."

Out Now Magazine's writer Kelia said the album was "fantastic" and recaptured the relatability that "catapulted Henderson to fame at 18". GSGM also gave the album a positive review, praising Henderson's vocals throughout. Reviewer Emily Harris said "Henderson welcomes us with open arms vocally, her stunning vocal technique mesmerising us within seconds. Also, we immediately acknowledge that this will be a heart-pounding experience."

== Commercial performance ==
According to the Official Charts Company, Everything I Didn't Say was set to debut within the top ten of the UK Albums Chart. On 22 March 2022, the album debuted at number eight on the UK Albums Chart and nine on the Scottish Albums Chart. It marked her second top ten entry in both charts. In Ireland, the album debuted at number seventy.

== Tours ==
=== Tales from the Script tour ===
In August 2021, Irish band the Script announced their greatest hits tour 'Tales from the Script', with Henderson as an opening act for venues across the UK, Ireland, Belgium and the Netherlands from 15 May 2022 through to 15 June 2022.

Setlist

Henderson's setlist from Liverpool Arena was confirmed by Writebase, it is not intended to be confirmatory of the setlist from each date of the tour.

1. "Risk It All"
2. "Crazy What Love Can Do"
3. "This Is Real"
4. "Glitterball"
5. "Let's Go Home Together"
6. "Ghost"

Reception Writing for Writebase, Rebecca Hodge called Henderson the best support act she had seen, praising Henderson's vocals and decision to invite her band's drummer to the front of the stage to sing Tom Grennan's parts on "Let's Go Home Together". According to Hodge, "the crowd adored her".

=== Everything I Didn't Say Tour ===
Everything I Didn't Say tour
- Tour by Ella Henderson
- Location: England; Scotland; Wales
- Associated album: Everything I Didn't Say
- Start date: 15 October 2022
- End date: 25 October 2022
- Legs: 1
- No. of shows: 8
- Supporting act: Cian Ducrot

Ella Henderson concert chronology
- Chapter One Tour (2015); Everything I Didn't Say tour (2022)

In February 2022, Henderson announced her first headline tour in seven years, in support of Everything I Didn't Say. The tour was confirmed to visit eight venues around the UK. Although it is only planned for the tour to visit the UK, Henderson expressed a desire to take the album on tour across Europe and the rest of the world.

This set list is representative of the show on 25 October 2022 in London. It is not representative of all concerts for the duration of the tour.

1. "Emotions"
2. "Risk It All"
3. "We Got Love"
4. "Places"
5. "Ugly"
6. "What About Us"
7. "All For You" (with Cian Ducrot)
8. "Let's Go Home Together" (with Cian Ducrot)
9. "Northern Lights"
10. "Everything I Didn't Say"
11. "Heartstrings"
12. "Crazy What Love Can Do"
13. "This Is Real" / "21 Reasons"
14. "Friends"
15. "Good Things Take Time" / "About Damn Time" (Lizzo cover)
16. "Glitterball"

Encore

17. "Yours"
18. "Brave"
19. "Ghost"

List of UK concert dates and venues
| Date | City | Country | Venue | Supporting Act |
|---|---|---|---|---|
| 15 October 2022 | Newcastle | England | Newcastle University | Cian Ducrot |
| 17 October 2022 | Glasgow | Scotland | SWG3 | Cian Ducrot |
| 18 October 2022 | Manchester | England | O_{2} Ritz | Cian Ducrot |
| 19 October 2022 | Leeds | England | Leeds Beckett Students' Union | Cian Ducrot |
| 20 October 2022 | Birmingham | England | O_{2} Institute | Cian Ducrot |
| 22 October 2022 | Oxford | England | O_{2} Academy Oxford | Cian Ducrot |
| 23 October 2022 | Cardiff | Wales | Tramshed | Cian Ducrot |
| 25 October 2022 | London | England | O_{2} Shepherd's Bush Empire | Cian Ducrot |

== Track listing ==
=== Standard edition ===
Everything I Didn't Say track listing
| No. | Title | Writer(s) | Producer(s) | Length |
|---|---|---|---|---|
| 1. | "Emotions" | Ella Henderson; Jordan Riley | Riley | 3:12 |
| 2. | "What About Us" | Henderson; Riley; Rob Harvey; Tre Jean-Marie | Riley; Jean-Marie | 3:20 |
| 3. | "Ugly" | Henderson; Ben Ash; Matthew Thomas Paul Holmes; Philip Anthony Leigh; Sasha Alex Sloan | Mac & Phil; Two Inch Punch^{[a]} | 3:33 |
| 4. | "Let's Go Home Together" (with Tom Grennan) | Henderson; Ben Kohn; Pete "Merf" Kelleher; Tom "Froe" Barnes; James Arthur | TMS; Ollie Green^{[b]} | 3:28 |
| 5. | "Brave" | Henderson; Jennifer Decilveo; Riley | Riley; Sam de Jong^{[a]}; Decilveo^{[a]} | 3:21 |
| 6. | "Out My Head" | Henderson; Olivia Sebastianelli; Toby Scott | Scott | 3:37 |
| 7. | "Thank You for the Hell" | Henderson; Riley | Riley | 2:34 |
| 8. | "Sorry That I Miss You" | Henderson; Steph Jones; Andreas Carlsson; Johan Carlsson | J. Carlsson | 2:36 |
| 9. | "Everything I Didn't Say" | Henderson; Mike Kintish | Kintish | 3:27 |
| 10. | "Bad News" | Henderson; Sebastianelli; Steve Manovski | Manovski | 3:16 |
| 11. | "Cry On Me" (featuring Mikky Ekko) | Henderson; Ekko; Green | Green | 3:47 |
| 12. | "Good Things Take Time" | Henderson; Hannes Roovers; Isac Hördegård; Moa Pettersson Hammar | Medium; Daniel Blume^{[a]}; Joris Mur^{[a]} | 2:31 |
| 13. | "Northern Lights" | Henderson; Riley | Riley | 2:47 |
| 14. | "Set in Stone" | Henderson; Lewis Daniel Thompson; Sebastianelli; Harvey | ^{[n/a]} | 2:45 |
| 15. | "Body" | Henderson; Alexander Shuckburgh; Trey Campbell | Al Shux | 3:18 |
| 16. | "Places" | Henderson; Malcolm "Bubba" McCarthy; Sebastianelli; Richard "Biff" Stannard | Biff & Bubba | 2:59 |
| Total length: | | | | 50:39 |

=== Deluxe edition ===
On 25 November 2022, Henderson released a deluxe edition of the album titled Everything I Didn't Say and More.

Everything I Didn't Say and More – Side A

Songs from the standard edition, plus:

| No. | Title | Writer(s) | Producer(s) | Length |
|---|---|---|---|---|
| 17. | "All for You" (with Cian Ducrot) | Ducrot; Henderson; Green | Ducrot | 3:41 |
| 18. | "Lighter" (with Nathan Dawe and featuring KSI; acoustic) | Henderson; Jonny Lattimer; Dawe; Olajide Olatunji; Tre Jean-Marie | Dawe; Jean-Marie | 2:31 |
| Total length: | | | | 56:51 |

Everything I Didn't Say and More – Side B
| No. | Title | Writer(s) | Producer(s) | Length |
|---|---|---|---|---|
| 1. | "21 Reasons" | Henderson; John Nicholas Ealand Morgan; Maegan Cottone; Dawe; Rune Reilly Koelsch; William Martyn Lansley | Dawe; Punctual | 2:35 |
| 2. | "Crazy What Love Can Do" (with Becky Hill and David Guetta) | Henderson; Hill; Guetta; Jordan Riley; Lewis Thompson; Naeve Applebaum; Rob Harvey | Guetta; Harvey; Riley; Thompson; Applebaum | 2:49 |
| 3. | "Hurricane" (with Ofenbach) | César Laurent de Rummel; Dorian Lauduique; Janik Riegert; Josh Tapen; Marc Buhr | Jen Jis; Ofenbach; Quarterhead | 2:27 |
| 4. | "Risk It All" (with House Gospel Choir and Just Kiddin) | Henderson; Charlotte Haining; Thomson; Harvey | Just Kiddin | 2:58 |
| 5. | "Dream on Me" (with Roger Sanchez) | Henderson; Riley; Sanchez; Uzoechi Emenike; Wrabel; Steve Lukather | Riley | 3:02 |
| 6. | "Take Care of You" | Henderson; Noel Zancanella; Justin Tranter; Julia Michaels | Zancanella | 3:14 |
| 7. | "We Got Love" (with Sigala) | Bruce Fielder; Joakim Jarl; Thomas Jules; Anne-Marie Nicholson; Derrick May; Michael James; Nicholas Gale; Henderson; Janee Bennett | Sigala; Jarley | 3:33 |
| 8. | "This Is Real" (with Jax Jones) | Henderson; Timucin Aluo; Emenike; Cottone | Jones; Mark Ralph; Tommy Forest | 3:19 |
| Total length: | | | | 23:57 |

Notes

- ^{^[a]} denotes additional production by
- ^{^[b]} denotes vocal production for Tom Grennan by
- ^{^[n/a]} no producer credits are given for this song, though Rob Harvey is credited as playing the guitar

== Credits and personnel ==
Adapted from the album's liner notes.

=== Recording locations ===
- Beam Me Up Studios, Brighton (track 6)
- Biffco Studios (track 16)
- BLNK Studios, Stockholm, Sweden (track 12)
- Breakfast Studios, London (track 5)
- Cotton Eye Studios (tracks 1–2, 7, 13)
- Church Studios (track 11)
- Decoy Studios (track 14)
- Hectic Studios, London (track 10)
- Metropolis Studios, London (tracks 1–3, 5–16)
- MXM, Los Angeles (track 8)
- Sarm Music Village, UK (track 15)
- The Baking House (track 9)
- The Church, London (track 4)
- The MixSuite (track 4)
- The Music Shed, London (track 4)
- The Spaceship, UK (track 15)
- The Spaceship, USA (track 15)
- Tileyard Studios, London (track 10)
- RAK Studios, London (track 4, track 11 – piano)
- Studio 13 (track 3)
- Wired Masters, UK (track 4)

=== Personnel ===
- Vern Ashbury – guitar
- Tom "Froe" Barnes – drums
- Chris Bishop – assistant engineer
- Daniel Blume – additional producer
- Johan Carlsson – producer, piano, pad
- Henri Davies – audio engineer
- Sam de Jong – additional producer, additional programmer
- Jennifer Decilveo – additional producer, background vocals
- Mikky Ekko – featured vocals (track 11)
- Dave Emery – mixing engineer
- Rob Harvey – guitar
- Stewart Hawkes – mastering engineer
- Ella Henderson – all background and lead vocals
- Sam Holland – recording engineer
- Matt Holmes – vocal sampling, synths
- Isac Hördegård – engineer programming, drums, bass, synths
- Kevin Grainger – mastering engineer
- Ollie Green – producer, vocal recording engineer, piano, synths
- Tom Grennan – featured vocals (track 4)
- TMS – producers, engineers
- Tre Jean-Marie – producer
- Peter "Merf" Kelleher – synths
- Mike Kintish – producer, engineer, piano, strings
- Sam Klempner – assistant engineer
- Ben Kohn – piano
- Philip Leigh – guitar, keys, bass
- Mac & Phil – producer
- Dante Hemingway - producer, engineer, programming, vocal production
- Steve Manovski – producer, engineer, drums, synths, programming
- Malcolm "Bubba" McCarthy – producer, engineer, instrumentation
- Medium – producer
- Joris Mur – additional producer
- Jay Reynolds – audio mixing engineer
- Jordan Riley – producer, guitar, drums, bass, keys, programming, engineer, piano, organ
- Hannes Roovers – engineer programming, drums, bass, synths
- Toby Scott – producer, engineer, keys, synths, drum programming, guitars, bass
- Olivia Sebastianelli – background vocals
- Robert Sellens – engineer
- Al Shux – producer, engineer, keyboard, programming
- Richard "Biff" Stannard – producer, engineer, instrumentation
- Mike "Spike Stent" – mixing engineer
- Two Inch Punch – additional producer, drums programming, bass, percussion, guitar
- Matt Wolach – assistant mixing engineer

== Charts ==
=== Weekly charts ===
Weekly chart performance for Everything I Didn't Say
| Chart (2022–2023) | Peak position |
|---|---|
| Irish Albums (OCC) | 30 |
| Scottish Albums (OCC) | 9 |
| UK Albums (OCC) | 8 |

=== Year-end charts ===
Year-end chart performance for Everything I Didn't Say
| Chart (2023) | Position |
|---|---|
| UK Albums (OCC) | 74 |

== Certifications ==
Certifications for Everything I Didn't Say
| Region | Certification | Certified units/sales |
|---|---|---|
| United Kingdom (BPI) | Gold | 100,000^{‡} |
^{‡} Sales+streaming figures based on certification alone.

== Release history ==
Release history for Everything I Didn't Say
| Region | Date | Edition | Format | Label | Ref. |
|---|---|---|---|---|---|
| Various | 11 March 2022 | Standard | Cassette; CD; digital download; streaming | Major Tom's; Asylum | |
| Various | 25 November 2022 | Deluxe | Digital download; streaming | Major Tom's; Asylum | |

== See also ==
- List of UK top-ten albums in 2022
