= Chapter One (Ella Henderson album) =

Studio album by Ella Henderson
- Released: 10 October 2014
- Recorded: 2013–2014
- Genre: Pop; soul; R&B
- Length: 48:30
- Label: Syco; Sony
- Producer: Steve Mac; Steve Robson; Toby Smith; Ryan Tedder; TMS; Dapo Torimiro; Noel Zancanella

Ella Henderson chronology
Chapter One (2014)	Everything I Didn't Say (2022)

Singles from Chapter One
- 1. "Ghost" Released: 8 June 2014; 2. "Glow" Released: 5 October 2014; 3. "Yours" Released: 30 November 2014; 4. "Mirror Man" Released: 8 March 2015

Chapter One is the debut studio album by English singer and songwriter Ella Henderson. It was released on 10 October 2014 by Syco Music. Chapter One reached number one in the UK in its first week of release. The album was preceded by the internationally successful single, "Ghost", as well as UK singles "Glow", "Yours" and "Mirror Man". In January 2015, the album was certified Platinum in the UK, shipping in excess of 300,000 copies.

== Background ==
On 18 November 2012, Henderson finished in sixth place on the ninth series of The X Factor, despite being the favourite to win. On 15 December, whilst being interviewed on the RTÉ chat show The Saturday Night Show, she revealed that she had signed a record deal with Sony Music. On 22 January 2013, Henderson confirmed she had signed to Simon Cowell's record label Syco Music. Regarding her decision to sign with Syco, Henderson said, "The most important thing I was looking for was to be involved creatively, and which label presents me with the best team to bring the best out of me. The fact that [Cowell] is letting me be involved creatively is overwhelming." In an interview with Digital Spy, Henderson said that, "I wanted each song to explain a situation, and then [for] the next song [to] kind of get you through that. I write very openly and lyrically, so it's very much like an open diary. I had to make sure it runs like that. It took me a while to get the tracklisting right, but I'm happy with it now."

On 15 June 2014, the same day as her debut single "Ghost" went to number one in the UK, Henderson announced the album's release date as 22 September 2014 through a series of tweets, posting one letter at a time. Shortly afterwards she announced on Twitter that the album would be available to pre-order the next day (16 June 2014). On 25 August, Henderson announced, on her Twitter account, that the album would be delayed until 13 October, "As I'm only just back [from an overseas tour] to start promoting".

== Promotion ==
To promote the album, Henderson has performed on Britain's Got Talent and at the Capital Summertime Ball. She also performed "Ghost" on The X Factor Australia results show on 18 August, marking her Australian television debut. Henderson has promoted her released music extensively around the world in 2014, including TV appearances in the UK (The X Factor, The Jonathan Ross Show, Alan Carr: Chatty Man, Sunday Night at the Palladium), the US (The Ellen DeGeneres Show, The Today Show, Dancing with the Stars, The Voice, Good Morning America), mainland Europe (The Voice of Germany) and Australia (The X Factor).

== Singles ==
"Ghost" was released as the album's lead single on 8 June 2014. The song peaked at number one on the UK Singles Chart and the Irish Singles Chart. It has also charted in the top 10 in Australia, Austria, Belgium, Germany, Hungary, New Zealand, South Africa and Switzerland. "Glow" was released as the second single on 5 October 2014 and peaked at number seven in the UK. "Yours" was released as the album's third single on 30 November 2014 and entered the top 40 at number 16 in the UK. Henderson confirmed "Mirror Man" as the album's fourth single during an appearance on Schlag den Raab. The song was released on 8 March 2015.

== Commercial performance ==
During the week preceding the album's debut on the UK Albums Chart, the Official Charts Company midweeks reported that Chapter One was outselling its nearest rival, Jessie J's Sweet Talker, by "more than two copies to one", and was expected to debut at number one. Chapter One debuted at number one on the Official Albums Chart with sales of 43,824 copies becoming the "third fastest-selling female debut chart-topper of 2014 behind Taylor Swift's 1989 and Sam Bailey's The Power of Love".

Chapter One became the 19th best-selling album of 2014 in the United Kingdom, with 261,831 copies sold. In January 2015, the album was certified Platinum in the UK by the BPI, with more than 300,000 copies sold in the country.

Outside of the UK, the album opened and peaked at number 11 on the Billboard 200 with first week sales of 33,000 overall units. Chapter One spent eleven weeks on the Billboard 200 before leaving. The album has sold 500,000 copies in the UK and over 1,000,000 copies worldwide.

== Critical reception ==
Professional ratings
Review scores
Source	Rating
AllMusic	3.5/5 stars
Digital Spy	4/5 stars
FDRMX	3.8 stars on a 5-point scale
Purple Revolver	(very positive)
Renowned for Sound	5/5 stars
So So Gay	4.2 stars on a 5-point scale
Sugarscape.com	4/4 stars
Unreality TV	4.5/5 stars

Upon release, Chapter One was met with highly positive reviews from mainstream critics. Marcus Floyd of Renowned for Sound lauded the album, awarding it a maximum 5 stars of out of a possible 5, calling it "simply stunning" and "a collection of gems that will and should be cherished". Lewis Corner of Digital Spy awarded the album 4 out of a possible 5 stars, labelling the album as being "a superb debut" and pointing out "Ghost", "Empire", "Mirror Man", "Rockets" and "Glow" as the top tracks to download from the album. Nick Barnes of Unreality TV also praised the album by awarding it 4 and a half out of a possible 5 stars, calling it "a PERFECT debut album" and highlighting "Empire", "Mirror Man", "Pieces", "The First Time" and "Rockets" as tracks to listen to from the album.

Digital Spy ranked Chapter One at number 5 on its ranking of albums released by former contestants of The X Factor, saying that the album "deserve[d] its high placing" on the list despite it being the most recent one on it (at the time Chapter One was in its first week of release and had yet to chart). Albums that ranked higher were Take Me Home by One Direction, Heaven by Rebecca Ferguson, Salute by Little Mix and Spirit by Leona Lewis at numbers four to one respectively. The article also praised Ella's "genuine talent for songwriting" as something that set her and Chapter One aside from other releases by former contestants of the show.

== Track listing ==
Chapter One — Standard edition
No.	Title	Writer(s)	Producer(s)	Length
1.	"Ghost"	Ella Henderson; Ryan Tedder; Noel Zancanella	Tedder; Zancanella	3:36
2.	"Empire"	Henderson; Camille Purcell; Peter Kelleher; Ben Kohn; Tom Barnes	TMS	3:49
3.	"Glow"	Purcell; Steve Mac	Mac	3:48
4.	"Yours"	Henderson; Josh Record	Record	2:48
5.	"Mirror Man"	Henderson; Al Shux; Laura Pergolizzi	Shux	3:42
6.	"Hard Work"	Henderson; Salaam Remi	Remi	4:32
7.	"Pieces"	Henderson; Kelleher; Kohn; Barnes; Johan Carlsson	TMS	3:43
8.	"The First Time"	Henderson; Antonio Lamar Dixon; Kenny "Babyface" Edmonds	Happy Perez; Babyface; Iain James	3:47
9.	"All Again"	Henderson; Jamie Scott	Scott; Toby Smith; Mike Needle	4:11
10.	"Give Your Heart Away"	Henderson; Carlsson	@Oakwud; Steve Mostyn; Carlsson; James	3:31
11.	"Rockets"	Henderson; Claude Kelly; Steve Robson	TMS; Robson	3:41
12.	"Lay Down"	Henderson; Kelleher; Kohn; Barnes	TMS	4:18
13.	"Missed"	Henderson; Darren Alboni; Christian Gilbart	Scott; Toby Smith; Needle	3:14
Total length:				48:30

Chapter One —Deluxe edition
No.	Title	Writer(s)	Producer(s)	Length
14.	"Billie Holiday"	Henderson; Richard Stannard; Ash Howes; Bradford Ellis; James Napier; Yusuf Islam	Stannard; Howes; Ellis; Richard Adlam; Hal Ritson	3:17
15.	"Beautifully Unfinished"	Henderson; Robson; Lindy Robbins	Robson; Komi Hakam	3:40
16.	"1996"	Henderson; Carlsson	Dapo Torimiro; Carlsson	2:51
17.	"Five Tattoos"	Henderson; Alboni	TMS	3:03
18.	"Giants"	Henderson; Robson; Kelly	Robson	3:37
Total length:				64:58

Chapter One — iTunes Store deluxe edition bonus tracks (pre-order only)
No.	Title	Writer(s)	Length
19.	"Believe" (acoustic) (Chapter One Sessions EP)	Brian Higgins; Stuart McLennen; Paul Barry; Steven Torch; Matthew Gray; Tim Powell
20.	"Rockets" (acoustic) (Chapter One Sessions EP)	Henderson; Robson; Kelly
21.	"Give Your Heart Away" (acoustic) (Chapter One Sessions EP)	Henderson; Carlsson

Chapter One — US standard edition
No.	Title	Length
1.	"Ghost"	3:36
2.	"Empire"	3:49
3.	"Glow"	3:48
4.	"Yours"	2:48
5.	"Mirror Man"	3:42
6.	"Hard Work"	4:32
7.	"Pieces"	3:43
8.	"All Again"	4:11
9.	"Give Your Heart Away"	3:31
10.	"Rockets"	3:41
11.	"Missed"	3:14
Total length:		40:35

Chapter One — US digital deluxe edition
No.	Title	Length
1.	"Ghost"	3:36
2.	"Empire"	3:49
3.	"Glow"	3:48
4.	"Yours"	2:48
5.	"Mirror Man"	3:42
6.	"Hard Work"	4:32
7.	"Pieces"	3:43
8.	"Five Tattoos"	3:02
9.	"The First Time"	3:47
10.	"All Again"	4:11
11.	"Give Your Heart Away"	3:31
12.	"Rockets"	3:41
13.	"Lay Down"	4:18
14.	"Missed"	3:14
Total length:		51:42

Chapter One — Target deluxe edition
No.	Title	Length
1.	"Ghost"	3:36
2.	"Empire"	3:49
3.	"Glow"	3:48
4.	"Yours"	2:48
5.	"Mirror Man"	3:42
6.	"Hard Work"	4:32
7.	"Beautifully Unfinished"	3:40
8.	"Pieces"	3:43
9.	"Give Your Heart Away"	3:31
10.	"All Again"	4:11
11.	"1996"	2:51
12.	"Rockets"	3:41
13.	"Giants"	3:37
14.	"Missed"	3:14
Total length:		50:43

== Charts ==
=== Weekly charts ===
Chart (2014–2015)	Peak position
Australian Albums (ARIA)	11
Austrian Albums (Ö3 Austria)	14
Belgian Albums (Ultratop Flanders)	27
Belgian Albums (Ultratop Wallonia)	88
Danish Albums (Hitlisten)	17
Dutch Albums (Album Top 100)	44
Finnish Albums (Suomen virallinen lista)	37
German Albums (Offizielle Top 100)	22
Irish Albums (IRMA)	4
New Zealand Albums (RMNZ)	9
Norwegian Albums (VG-lista)	20
Scottish Albums (OCC)	1
Spanish Albums (PROMUSICAE)	53
Swedish Albums (Sverigetopplistan)	34
Swiss Albums (Schweizer Hitparade)	9
UK Albums (OCC)	1
US Billboard 200	11

=== Year-end charts ===
Chart (2014)	Position
UK Albums (OCC)	19
Chart (2015)	Position
UK Albums (OCC)	31

== Certifications ==
Region	Certification	Certified units/sales
Denmark (IFPI Danmark)	Gold	10,000^{‡}
New Zealand (RMNZ)	Gold	7,500^{‡}
United Kingdom (BPI)	Platinum	453,000
^{‡} Sales+streaming figures based on certification alone.

== Release history ==
Country	Date	Format	Label
Ireland	10 October 2014	CD; digital download	Syco
United Kingdom	13 October 2014	CD; digital download	Syco
Australia	17 October 2014	CD; digital download	Syco
United States	13 January 2015	CD; digital download	Syco
