= Brave (Ella Henderson song) =

Single by Ella Henderson

from the album Everything I Didn't Say
- Released: 7 January 2022
- Studio: London, UK (Breakfast; Metropolis)
- Length: 3:21
- Label: Major Tom's; Asylum
- Songwriters: Ella Henderson; Jennifer Decilveo; Jordan Riley
- Producer: Jordan Riley

Ella Henderson singles chronology
"Hurricane" (2021)	"Brave" (2022)	"Crazy What Love Can Do" (2022)

Music video
- "Brave" on YouTube

"Brave" is a song by British singer and songwriter Ella Henderson, released as the second single from her second studio album Everything I Didn't Say on 7 January 2022. It was written by Henderson, Fred Ball, Jennifer Decilveo and Jordan Riley, with Riley producing the track. The song peaked at number 42 on the UK Singles Chart.

== Background ==
Henderson first performed the song during a sold-out show at Hoxton Hall in London in November 2019, and then during a "Live at Home" concert for Billboard in April 2020. A press release stated the song is about "shaking the stigma of needing help and embracing someone’s support for you when you need them most".

Following the song's release, Henderson dedicated it to 16-year-old Scottish singer Paige Dougall, with whom she collaborated on the song "I'm Going Through Hell" in October 2021. Dougall died of Ewing's sarcoma cancer just after the release of "Brave" in January 2022.

== Music video ==
The music video was released the same day as the song and was directed by Plum Stupple-Harris. It depicts the hardships faced by a single mother in her everyday life.

== Track listing ==
Digital download/streaming

1. "Brave" – 3:21

Digital single – acoustic

1. "Brave" (acoustic) – 3:49

Digital remix single

1. "Brave" (Luca Schreiner remix) – 2:49

== Personnel and credits ==
=== Song ===
Credits adapted from Everything I Didn't Say album booklet.

Recording locations

- Breakfast Studios; London, UK
- Metropolis Studios; London, UK

Personnel

- Jennifer Decilveo – additional producer, background vocals
- Ella Henderson – lead and background vocals
- Stuart Hawkes – audio mastering
- Sam de Jong – additional production, additional programming
- Jay Renolds – mixing
- Jordan Riley – production, engineer, drums, bass, organ, Farfisa, guitar, bass, programming

=== Music video ===
Adapted from official music video on YouTube.

- Connor Adam – director of photography
- Victoria Adcock – artist stylist
- Miles Berkley-Smith – editor
- Tomás Brice – director of photography
- Jodie Charman – production assistant
- Joseph Crone – SA stylist
- Jon Dobson @Wash – grade
- Bridget Gardiner – SA make-up artist
- Pól Gill – first associate director
- Talor Hanson – producer
- Kofi Jr – production manager
- Aimée Kelly – actor (plays "Alice")
- Lisa Laudat – make-up artist
- Ginger McRae – SA stylist assistant
- Kingsley Meadham – actor (plays "Zach")
- Josephine Melville – actor (plays "social worker")
- OB Management – production company
- Plum Stupple-Harris – director
- Katie Prescott – SA hair
- Louis Tarbuck – art director
- Hilary Whelan – actor (plays "kind lady")
- Yellow Fish Group – production company

== Charts ==
Chart performance for "Brave"
Chart (2022)	Peak position
Euro Digital Song Sales (Billboard)	15
Ireland (IRMA)	89
New Zealand Hot Singles (RMNZ)	40
South Africa Radio (RISA)	45
UK Singles (Official Charts)	42

== Certifications ==
Certifications for "Brave"
Region	Certification	Certified units/sales
United Kingdom (BPI)	Silver	200,000^{‡}
^{‡} Sales+streaming figures based on certification alone.

== Release history ==
Release history for "Brave"
Region	Date	Format	Version	Label	Ref.
Various	7 January 2022	Digital download; streaming	Original	Major Tom's; Asylum; Warner Music	
Various	28 January 2022	Digital download; streaming	Acoustic	Major Tom's; Asylum; Warner Music	
Various	11 February 2022	Digital download; streaming	Luca Schreiner remix	Major Tom's; Asylum; Warner Music	
