= Take Care of You =

Single by Ella Henderson

from the album Everything I Didn't Say and More
- Released: 12 June 2020
- Length: 3:14
- Label: Asylum
- Songwriters: Noel Zancanella; Justin Tranter; Julia Michaels; Ella Henderson
- Producers: Noel Zancanella; Daniel Blume

Ella Henderson singles chronology
"Hold Me Close" (2020)	"Take Care of You" (2020)	"Dream on Me" (2020)

Music video
- "Take Care of You" on YouTube

"Take Care of You" is a song by English singer and songwriter Ella Henderson. The song was released on as a single on 12 June 2020 and was later included on the deluxe edition of Henderson's second studio album Everything I Didn't Say (2022), titled, Everything I Didn't Say and More.

The song peaked at number 50 on the UK Singles Chart and remained on the chart for 12 weeks.

== Background ==
Talking about the song, Henderson said, "When I wrote Take Care of You I couldn't put into words how I was feeling, but alongside two of my favourite writers in the world, Julia and Justin, they helped me turn my thoughts into song. This song is for everyone I love, as well as a message of self-care - a personal reminder to look after myself, both mentally and physically."

== Live performances ==
Henderson performed the song for the first time on Sunday Brunch on 21 June 2020. Other major performances of the single include her performance on Martin & Roman's Sunday Best, as well as Blue Peter. Henderson performed the song on Top of the Pops 2020 Christmas special.

== Music video ==
A music video to accompany the release of "Take Care of You" was first released onto YouTube on 12 June 2020.

== Personnel ==
Credits adapted from Tidal.

- Daniel Blume – producer
- Noel Zancanella – producer, composer
- Ella Henderson – composer, lead vocals
- Julia Michaels – composer
- Justin Tranter – composer
- Ryan Tedder – backing vocals
- Brent Kolatalo – additional production
- Dom Lyttle – additional production
- Dante Hemingway – additional production, mixer, vocal production
- Joris Muir – additional production
- Ken Lewis – additional production
- Kevin Grainger – mixer
- Jordan Riley – vocal production

== Charts ==
Chart (2020)	Peak position
Belgium (Ultratip Bubbling Under Wallonia)	12
Ireland (IRMA)	79
Scottish Singles Sales (Official Charts)	8
UK Singles (Official Charts)	50

== Certifications ==
Certifications for "Take Care of You"
Region	Certification	Certified units/sales
United Kingdom (BPI)	Silver	200,000^{‡}
^{‡} Sales+streaming figures based on certification alone.
