= Yours (Ella Henderson song) =

2014 single by Ella Henderson

Single by Ella Henderson

from the album Chapter One
- Released: 30 November 2014
- Recorded: 2014
- Genre: Pop; soul
- Length: 2:48
- Label: Syco
- Songwriters: Ella Henderson; Josh Record
- Producer: Record

Ella Henderson singles chronology
"Glow" (2014)	"Yours" (2014)	"Mirror Man" (2015)

Music video
- "Yours" on YouTube

"Yours" is a song by English singer and songwriter Ella Henderson. It was released 30 November 2014 via Syco Music as the third single off Henderson's debut studio album, Chapter One (2014). The song was co-written by Henderson and Josh Record. The single has gone on to sell in excess of 600,000 copies since its release, achieving a platinum accreditation from the British Phonographic Industry.

== Track listing ==
Digital download — Remixes EP

1. "Yours" (Wideboys Remix) – 4:37
2. "Yours" (Philip George Remix) – 3:29
3. "Yours" (Tobtok Remix) – 4:24
4. "Yours" (Patrick Hagenaar Colour Code Remix) – 3:54

== Music video ==
The black-and-white video for "Yours" was directed by James Lees and premiered on 5 December 2014.

== Charts ==
Weekly chart performance for "Yours"
Chart (2014)	Peak position
Hungary (Rádiós Top 40)	13
Ireland (IRMA)	41
Scotland Singles (OCC)	8
UK Singles (OCC)	16

== Certifications ==
Certifications for "Yours"
Region	Certification	Certified units/sales
United Kingdom (BPI)	Platinum	600,000^{‡}
^{‡} Sales+streaming figures based on certification alone.

== Release history ==
Release dates and formats for "Yours"
Region	Date	Format	Label
United Kingdom	30 November 2014	Digital download	Syco
