= Ella Henderson =

British singer (born 1996)

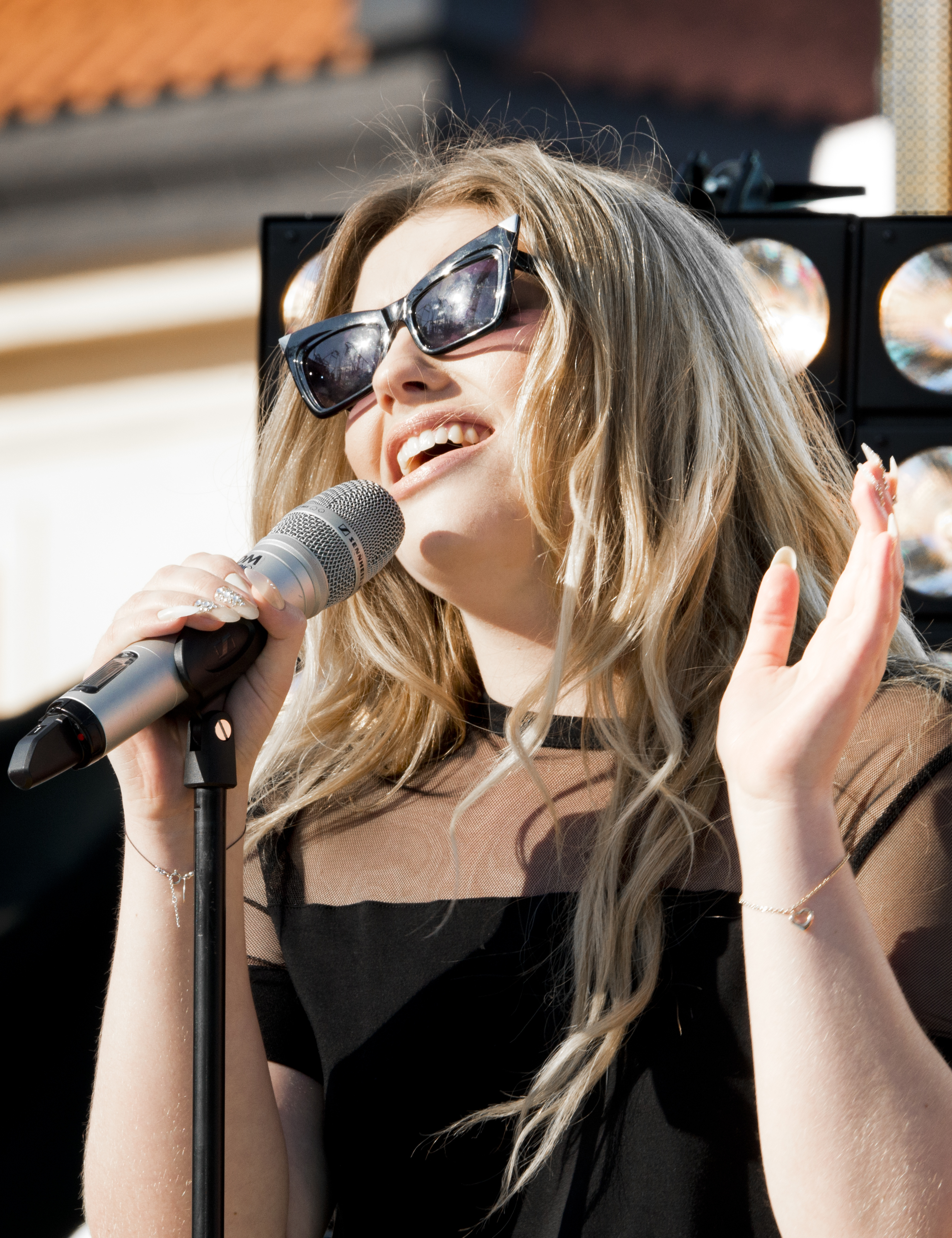
- Henderson in 2014

Background information
- Born: Gabriella Michelle Henderson; 12 January 1996 (age 30)
- Origin: Grimsby, England
- Genres: Pop; R&B; soul; house
- Occupations: Singer; songwriter
- Instruments: Vocals; piano
- Years active: 2012–present
- Labels: Syco; Asylum; Major Toms
- Partner(s): Jack Burnell (2020–present; engaged)
- Website: www.ellahenderson.co.uk

Gabriella Michelle Henderson (born 12 January 1996), is a British singer who rose to prominence after competing in the ninth series of The X Factor UK in 2012, finishing in sixth place. She signed with Syco Music shortly after, and released her debut album, Chapter One (2014), which reached number one in the UK. The album spawned the chart-topping single "Ghost", as well as the top 20 singles "Glow" and "Yours". She went on a four-year hiatus in 2015, and released her second album, Everything I Didn't Say, in 2022. It became her second top 10 album in the UK.

In addition to solo material, Henderson recorded a string of successful collaborations, including the UK top 10 singles: "Glitterball" with Sigma, "This Is Real" with Jax Jones, "Let's Go Home Together" with Tom Grennan, "Crazy What Love Can Do" with David Guetta and Becky Hill, "21 Reasons" with Nathan Dawe, "React" with Switch Disco, "0800 Heaven" with Dawe and Joel Corry, and "Alibi" with Rudimental. She has received the Brit Billion Award, and nominations for four Brit Awards and an Ivor Novello Award.

== Early life ==
Henderson was born on 12 January 1996, the daughter of Michelle and Sean Henderson. She has two brothers and a sister.

She began singing when she was around three years old and taught herself to play the piano a few years later. She put on Christmas shows for her family and was encouraged to pursue her love of music and songwriting by her paternal grandfather. Her interest developed further at St Martins Prep School in Grimsby, and she subsequently decided to audition for a scholarship place at Tring Park School for the Performing Arts in Tring. She boarded at the school between the ages of 11 and 16. She attended the school at the same time as Dan Ferrari-Lane, who later became a member of the boyband District3 which appeared on The X Factor alongside Henderson in 2012. In 2011, she made a singing appearance on a celebrity Christmas special of the Channel 4 series Come Dine with Me, where she performed "All I Want for Christmas Is You".

== Career ==
=== 2012: The X Factor ===
Henderson auditioned for series nine of The X Factor in 2012, with the original song called "Missed", which was later included on her debut studio album. She reached the live shows and was mentored by Tulisa. Henderson and James Arthur were controversially in the bottom two in week seven and sang for survival. Tulisa and Louis Walsh voted to send Henderson through to the quarter-final and Nicole Scherzinger and Gary Barlow voted to send Arthur through to the quarter-final. The result went to deadlock and Arthur advanced to the quarter-final receiving 13.7% of the vote and Henderson received 12.1%. She consequently was the eighth contestant eliminated, despite being a strong favourite to win.

Presenter Dermot O'Leary described Henderson's exit as "one of the biggest shocks we've ever had on the results show". During the show and following her exit, a number of celebrities stated their support and praise for Henderson, including Adele, Lily Allen, Cher, Simon Cowell, Stephen Fry, Nick Grimshaw, Sarah Millican, and Chloë Grace Moretz. On a 2013 episode of The Xtra Factor, O'Leary said that he viewed Henderson as the most talented performer he had seen during his seven years on the show.

Performances on The X Factor
Episode	Theme	Song	Original Artist	Result
First Audition	Free Choice	"Missed" (Note: Henderson confirmed that writing the song "Missed" was inspired by her grandfather Bill and that it reminds her of him; the lyric "Goodbye" is particularly poignant for her.)	Ella Henderson	Advanced To Bootcamp
Second Audition	Free Choice	"Midnight Train to Georgia" (Note: Henderson's second audition, "Midnight Train to Georgia", was not aired on TV.)	Gladys Knight & the Pips	Advanced To Bootcamp
Bootcamp	Solo Performance	"Believe"	Cher	Advanced To Judges' Houses
Judges' Houses	Free Choice	"I Won't Give Up"	Jason Mraz	Advanced To The Live Shows
Live Show 1	Heroes	"Rule the World"	Take That	Safe (3rd) – 13.1%
Live Show 2	Love And Heartbreak	"Loving You"	Minnie Riperton	Safe (4th) – 9.5%
Live Show 3	Club Classics	"You Got the Love"	Candi Staton	Safe (3rd) – 10.2%
Live Show 4	Halloween	"Bring Me to Life"	Evanescence	Safe (6th) – 8.2%
Live Show 5	Number-Ones	"Firework"	Katy Perry	Safe (5th) – 8.8%
Live Show 6	Best Of British	"Written in the Stars"	Tinie Tempah	Safe (4th) – 13.0%
Live Show 7	Guilty Pleasures	"You're the One That I Want"	Olivia Newton-John & John Travolta	Bottom Two (6th) – 12.1%
Live Show 7	Final Showdown	"If You're Not the One"	Daniel Bedingfield	Eliminated (Deadlock)

=== 2012–2015: Chapter One ===
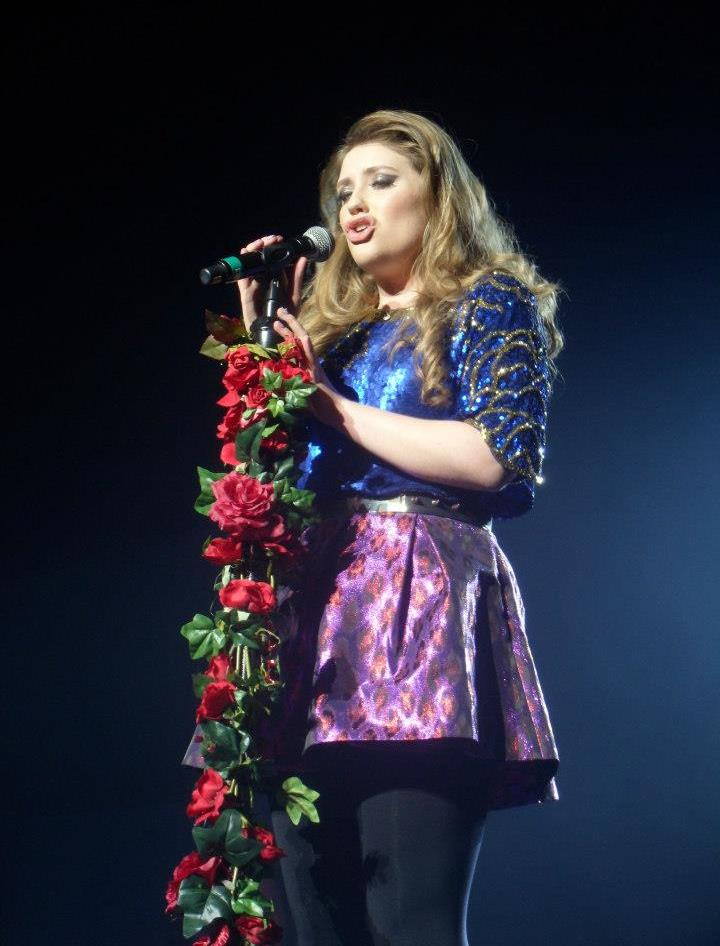
Henderson performing during the X Factor UK Live tour of 2013

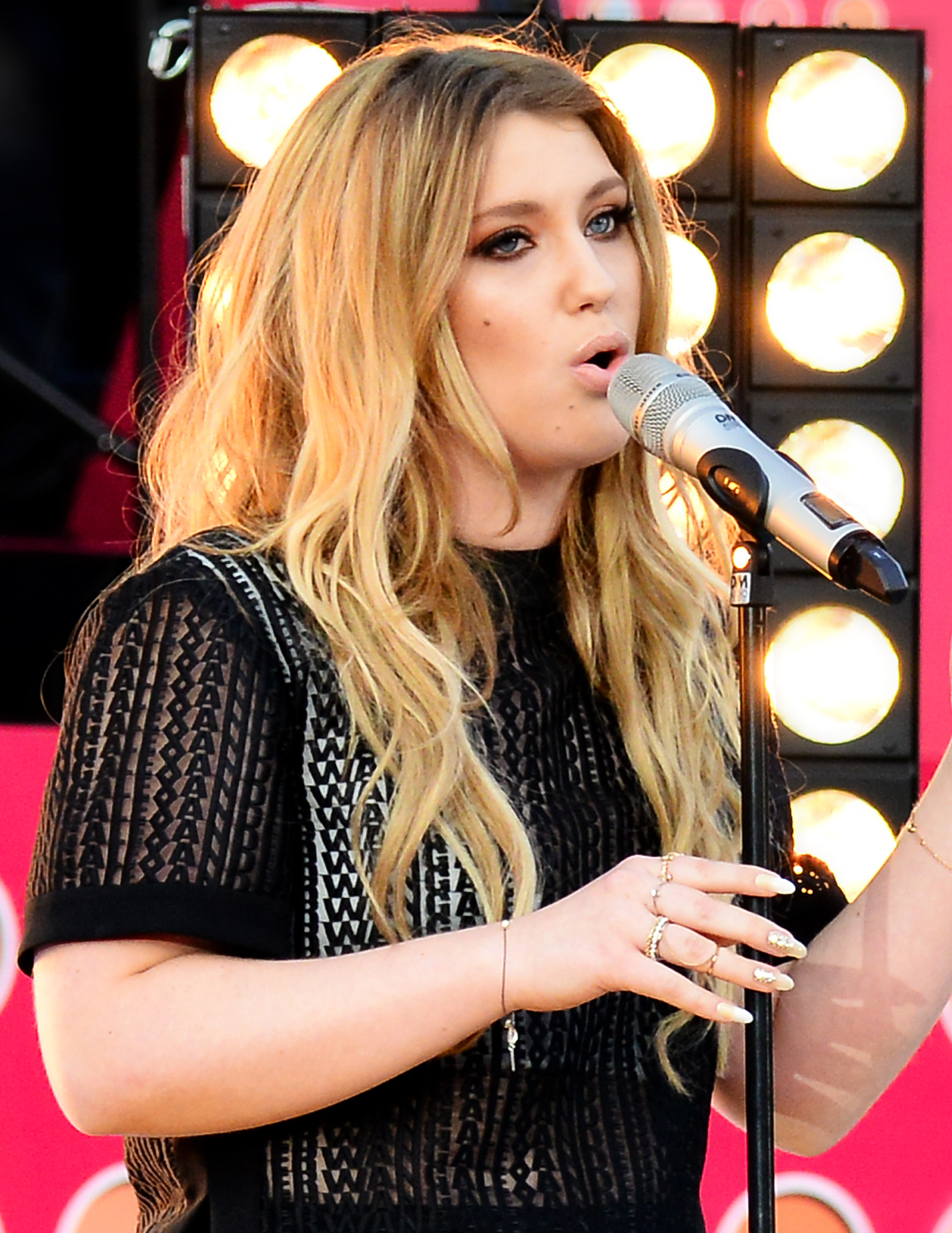
Henderson in 2014

In December 2012, Henderson made an appearance on Ireland's RTÉ The Saturday Night Show, singing "Silent Night". While being interviewed on the show, she revealed that she had signed a record deal with Sony Music Entertainment. She also performed "Last Christmas" and "Have Yourself a Merry Little Christmas" on the Myleene Klass Heart FM show that month. In January 2013, Henderson confirmed she had signed to Simon Cowell's record label Syco Music. During January and February 2013, she took part in The X Factor live tour, where she sang four songs: her X Factor audition song "Missed", "Believe", "Rule the World" and "You Got the Love". She also performed "Believe" at the 18th National Television Awards in January, and appeared as a special guest at the Capital Summertime Ball in June, where she performed a duet of "Beneath Your Beautiful" with Labrinth.

Henderson's debut single, "Ghost", co-written with Ryan Tedder, was released on 8 June 2014. It debuted at number one on the UK Singles Chart, and remained in the top five of the chart for eight consecutive weeks. It has subsequently been certified platinum for sales in Australia, New Zealand, the United Kingdom, and the United States. The song later ranked at number 84 on the Official Charts Company list of the 100 biggest songs of the 2010s in the UK. Its follow-up, "Glow", was released on 5 October 2014 and charted at number seven in the UK. Henderson's debut studio album, Chapter One, was released on 13 October 2014. It was written by Henderson in collaboration with a number of writers and producers including Claude Kelly, Salaam Remi, Babyface and TMS. The album peaked at number one on the UK Albums Chart, and was the 19th and 31st best-selling album in the UK in 2014 and 2015, respectively. It was certified platinum by the British Phonographic Industry (BPI). The album also charted in the top 20 in Australia, Austria, Denmark, Ireland, New Zealand, Norway, Switzerland, and the United States. Its third and fourth singles, "Yours" and "Mirror Man", were released on 30 November 2014 and 9 March 2015, respectively. The former charted at number 16 in the UK.

Henderson performed as the supporting act for Take That on their 38 date Take That Live 2015 UK tour, while embarking on her debut headlining UK tour in October and November 2015. That July, she featured on drum and bass duo Sigma's single "Glitterball", which peaked at number four in the UK. Henderson also featured on Norwegian record producer and DJ Kygo's song "Here for You", which was released on 4 September. The collaboration achieved global-wide chart success peaking within the top 20 in the Netherlands, Norway, Sweden, Switzerland and the United Kingdom.

=== 2016–2019: Asylum Records and Glorious ===
In November 2016, Henderson announced that she had finished recording her second studio album, having worked with Danny O'Donoghue from The Script and producer Max Martin. In April 2017, it was announced that she would be supporting James Arthur on his Back from the Edge Tour. In June, she featured along with other artists, including fellow X Factor artists Leona Lewis, Louis Tomlinson, Liam Payne, James Arthur, Louisa Johnson and Matt Terry on a cover version of Simon & Garfunkel's song "Bridge over Troubled Water", which was recorded to raise money for those affected by the Grenfell Tower fire in London earlier that month. The single reached number one in the UK after only two days sales. Later that year, it was announced that Arthur had recorded a duet with Henderson, reportedly set to be included on her second studio album. While supporting him on his tour, she performed new songs that were set to be included on the record: "Ugly", "Cry Like a Woman", "Bones", "Solid Gold" and "Let's Go Home Together", her duet with Arthur.

In February 2018, it was announced that Henderson and Syco Music had parted ways. In a statement, a Syco representative stated: "Syco and Ella Henderson are parting company. We wish Ella all the best for the future and thank her for her hugely successful contribution over the years." In May 2018, Henderson confirmed that she had completed work on her second studio album. Later that year, she signed a record deal with Asylum Records' imprint Major Toms operated by the British group Rudimental, and was working on new material with them, presumably meaning that the previously confirmed album was scrapped. She also supported Rudimental on their European tour that year. Regarding the scrapped material, Henderson later told i: "I did write an album – well, I say an album, I wrote a body of work. But I was so lost in terms of who I was as a person that I wasn't ready to release it. I knew that if I didn't know what was going on, my fans wouldn't either."

On 13 September 2019, Henderson released "Glorious" as the lead single from her EP of the same name, which was released on 8 November. Its second single, "Young", was released on 11 October. Henderson also featured on Jax Jones' song "This Is Real", from his debut album Snacks (Supersize), which was released as a single on 11 October, and on Sigala's single "We Got Love", which was released on 1 November. Both tracks charted in the UK, peaking at numbers 9 and 42, respectively.

=== 2020–2023: Everything I Didn't Say and collaborations ===
Henderson featured on Dutch DJ Sam Feldt's song "Hold Me Close" released on 27 March 2020. She followed it with the single "Take Care of You" on 12 June, which reached number 50 in the UK. In July, she provided uncredited vocals for a UK top five single she had co-written titled "Lighter" by British DJ and producer Nathan Dawe, featuring British YouTuber and rapper KSI. Henderson released the single "Dream On Me" with Roger Sanchez on 2 October 2020, and a Christmas song "Blame It on the Mistletoe" with AJ Mitchell on 4 December.

On 19 February 2021, she released her collaboration with Tom Grennan titled "Let's Go Home Together", which debuted at number 28 in the UK and peaked at 10 becoming Henderson's fifth UK top 10 single. The song was originally a duet between Henderson and James Arthur, and they performed it together live on Arthur's 2017 arena tour, but due to a scheduling conflict Henderson recorded its single version with Grennan instead. On 20 August 2021, Henderson released the single "Risk It All" with House Gospel Choir and Just Kiddin, followed by a collaboration with the French DJ duo Ofenbach titled "Hurricane" the next month.

On 7 January 2022, she released the single "Brave", which preceded her second studio album, Everything I Didn't Say, released on 11 March 2022. "Brave" reached number 42 in the UK, while Everything I Didn't Say debuted at number eight. In April, she collaborated with David Guetta and Becky Hill on the song "Crazy What Love Can Do". The single charted in several countries, including the UK where it debuted in the top 20 and peaked at number five. In April 2022, Nathan Dawe released a second collaboration with Henderson titled "21 Reasons", which reached number nine in the UK. In August 2022, Henderson featured on a duet version of Cian Ducrot's song "All for You". In September, she collaborated with British-German DJ duo M-22 on the song "Heartstrings".

Later in 2022, Henderson performed at a number of UK Pride events, and was booked at UK Music and TikTok showcases at the Labour Party Conference and Conservative Party Conference. The Labour conference performance was subsequently cancelled due to reported illness. Henderson's appearance at the Conservative conference attracted criticism from the LGBT Community, as some felt it was incompatible with performing at Pride Events. The UK Music Industry released a statement pointing out that the events were held as part of the political party conferences to highlight the importance of the UK music industry and were not an indication of political affiliation. Neither Henderson or her management team quoted the UK Music Industry statement or commented on the controversy.

In January 2023, Henderson collaborated with Switch Disco on the song "React", which became her eighth UK top-ten single, peaking at number four on the UK Singles Chart. The song heavily samples Robert Miles' 1995 single "Children". Henderson next featured on Frank Walker's single "I Go Dancing". In March, she released her collaboration with DJ Regard titled "No Sleep", shortly followed by the song "Like I Used To" with Sonny Fodera and Paul Woolford in April. In June, she released "0800 Heaven" with Nathan Dawe and Joel Corry, which reached number nine in the UK. In August, she featured on Glockenbach's single "Lifeline".

On 27 October 2023, Henderson released her second Christmas song with Irish singer-songwriter Cian Ducrot called "Rest of Our Days".

=== 2024–present: Upcoming third studio album ===
In January 2024, Henderson started teasing an upcoming song titled "Alibi" on her TikTok. On 10 January 2024, Henderson announced that the song would be released on 12 January 2024 and features UK drum and bass band Rudimental. On 8 March 2024, Henderson released the song "Mamma You Were Right". On 5 April 2024, Henderson teamed up with Natasha Bedingfield to remix "Alibi". On 31 May 2024, Henderson released the song "Under The Sun" with Switch Disco and Alok. On 17 September 2024, Henderson announced the song "Filthy Rich" as the lead single from her upcoming third studio album. The song was released on 4 October 2024. "One Door Closes", a collaboration with Breland, was released on 21 March 2025. On 8 May 2025, Henderson released her third single "Me & You".

== Personal life ==
Henderson has been in a relationship with English retired swimmer Jack Burnell since early 2020. They became engaged in January 2023.

In July 2025, she revealed her endometriosis diagnosis.

== Discography ==
- Chapter One (2014)
- Everything I Didn't Say (2022)

== Tours ==
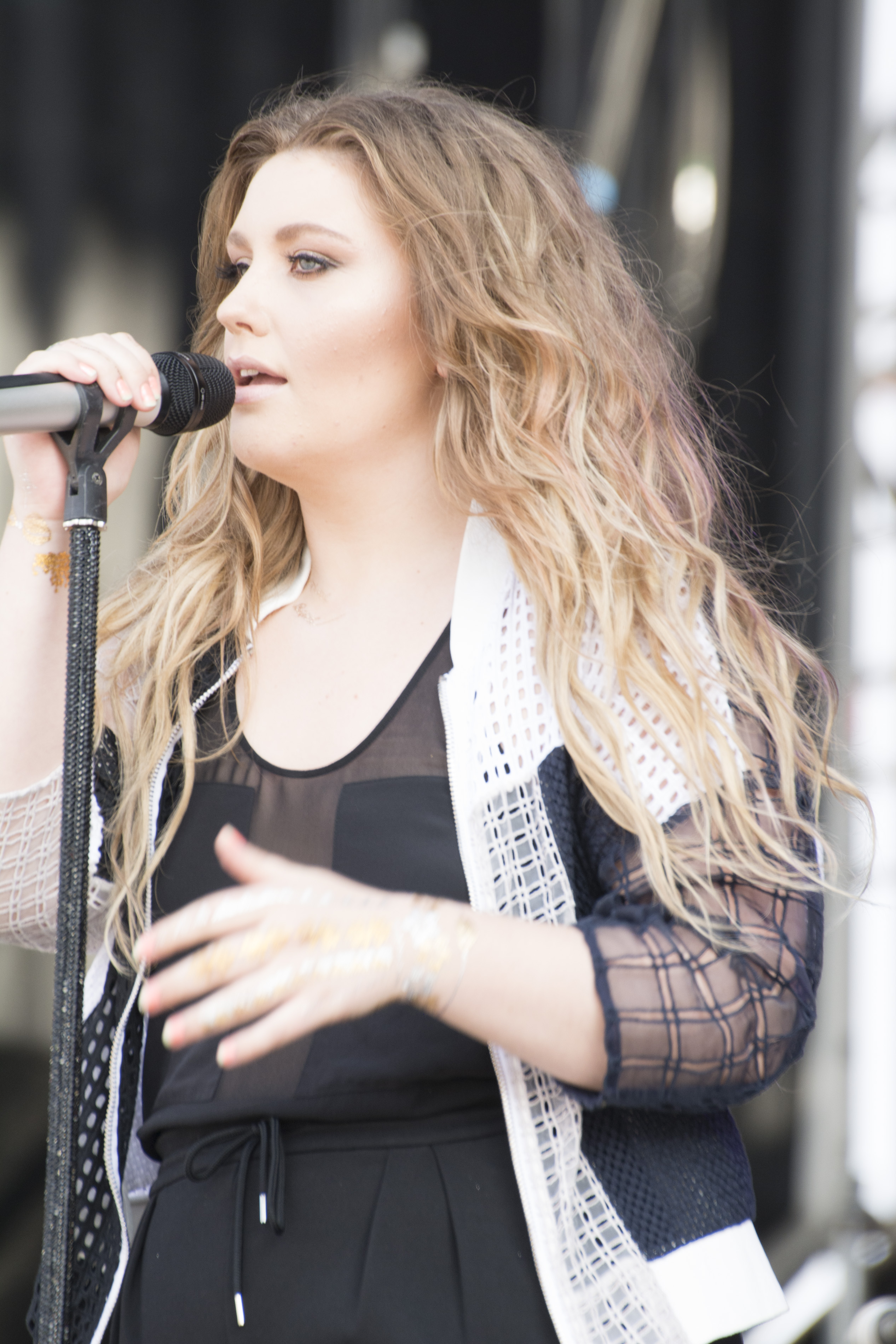
Henderson in 2015

=== Headlining ===
- Chapter One Tour (2015)
- Everything I Didn't Say Tour (2022)

=== Supporting ===
- Take That Live (2015; UK leg)
- Back from the Edge Tour (2017)
- Tales from the Script: Greatest Hits Tour (2022)
- Escape to... Tour (2025–2026)

== Awards and nominations ==
Award	Year	Category	Result	Ref.
Attitude Awards	2014	Best Breakthrough Artist	Won	
BBC Music Awards	2014	Song of the Year: "Ghost"	Nominated	
BBC Radio 1's Teen Awards	2014	Best British Solo Artist	Nominated	
BBC Radio 1's Teen Awards	2014	Friday Download's Best Breakthrough Award	Nominated	
BBC Radio 1's Teen Awards	2014	Best British Single: "Ghost"	Nominated	
Brit Awards	2015	Best British Female Solo Artist	Nominated	
Brit Awards	2015	Best British Single: "Ghost"	Nominated	
Brit Awards	2024	Song of the Year: "React"	Nominated	
Brit Awards	2025	Song of the Year: "Alibi"	Nominated	
Brit Billion Award	2023	—N/a	Won	
Cosmopolitan Ultimate Women of the Year Awards	2014	Ultimate UK Music Artist	Won	
Digital Spy Reader Awards	2014	Best Song: "Ghost"	Second	
Digital Spy Reader Awards	2014	Best Album: Chapter One	Fourth	
Digital Spy Reader Awards	2014	Best Female Solo Artist	Second	
Electronic Dance Music Awards	2023	Music Video of the Year: "Crazy What Love Can Do"	Nominated	
Electronic Dance Music Awards	2023	Best Use of Sample: "21 Reasons"	Nominated	
Electronic Dance Music Awards	2024	Vocalist of the Year	Nominated	
Electronic Dance Music Awards	2024	Best Collaboration: "0800 Heaven"	Nominated	
Electronic Dance Music Awards	2024	Dance / Electro Pop Song of the Year: "No Sleep"	Nominated	
Electronic Dance Music Awards	2024	Dance / Electro Pop Song of the Year: "I Go Dancing"	Won	
Ivor Novello Awards	2022	Best Song Musically and Lyrically: "Let's Go Home Together"	Nominated	
Official Top 10 Award	2024	—N/a	Won	
Popjustice £20 Music Prize	2020	Best British Pop Single: "Take Care of You"	Nominated	
VH1 Artist of the Year	2015	—N/a	Nominated	
