= Alan Carr: Chatty Man =

British comedy chat TV show

- Genre: Chat show
- Directed by: Chris Howe
- Presented by: Alan Carr
- Country of origin: United Kingdom
- Original language: English
- No. of series: 16
- No. of episodes: 181 (list of episodes)

Production
- Executive producers: Andrew Beint; Addison Cresswell; Richard Ackerman
- Producers: Open Mike Productions; Jon Holman
- Production location: The London Studios
- Running time: 50–80 minutes
- Production company: Open Mike Productions

Original release
- Network: Channel 4
- Release: 14 June 2009 – 25 December 2017

Related
- The Sunday Night Project; The Justin Lee Collins Show; Alan Carr's Specstacular

Alan Carr: Chatty Man (also simply known as Chatty Man) is a British comedy chat show presented by comedian Alan Carr. The show included interviews with celebrity guests, sketches, topical chat and music. In 2013, Carr won a BAFTA for Best Entertainment Performance.

The show was first on as two pilots in late May 2009. It proved popular with the public and was commissioned for a full series and ran for 16 series from 2009 to 2016. The first episode drew in a total of 2.15 million viewers. To date, the show has broadcast 16 series and 181 episodes. The eleventh series consisted of 18 episodes, making it the longest series to date. A new series began airing on 30 August 2013. In 2013, Carr signed a two-year contract extension with Channel 4 for £4 million. The sixteenth and final series ran from 3 March to 5 May 2016.

In continental Europe and Scandinavia, Alan Carr: Chatty Man was shown on BBC Entertainment a week behind the UK. Old episodes aired on 4Music between 2012 and 2013. The show returned for a Christmas special in December 2017.

== Filming ==
A structural difference from other British chat shows is that, while the guests for each episode of Chatty Man all film on the same day, there is rarely any on-screen interaction between the guests. A guest will be introduced and be interviewed and then they are almost always gone when the next guest comes out. An advantage to this process is that Carr is able to pre-tape interviews with certain guests. If a particular guest is unavailable to be interviewed on the chosen week, an interview can be pre-taped and slotted in during the next week's editing. Often, at the end of a series, the final episode can be made up of three pre-taped interviews (as well as a musical performance) filmed earlier in that particular series' run, thus eliminating one tape date. However, in the later series, all guests returned to the sofa during the final part of the programme.

=== Issues ===
An interview with Marilyn Manson was recorded in mid-2009; however, due to Manson's drunkenness, plans to air the interview were scrapped.

== Cancellation ==
On 9 October 2016, it was confirmed that Chatty Man had been cancelled due to low ratings compared to rival show The Graham Norton Show. The show aired a Christmas Special on Christmas Day, which was the last episode.

Chatty Man was replaced by the spin-off show Alan Carr's Happy Hour, which began on 2 December 2016.

== International broadcasts ==
- In some Nordic countries (Sweden, Norway, Denmark and Finland), Chatty Man is shown on BBC Entertainment since September 2012 and BBC Brit since May 2015.
- In the Netherlands, Belgium and Sweden, Chatty Man is shown on OutTV.
- In continental Europe, it is shown on BBC Entertainment on a weekly basis, a few weeks behind the original broadcast in the UK.
- In Belgium, it is shown on Acht, weekly, a few weeks behind the original UK broadcast.
- In Australia, it is shown on BBC UKTV with rebroadcasts on ABC.
- In New Zealand, Chatty Man is aired on TV One.
- In Canada, it is shown on OutTV.
- In South Africa, it is shown on SABC 3 on Saturdays.
