= Ghost (Ella Henderson song) =

Single by Ella Henderson

from the album Chapter One
- Released: 8 June 2014
- Recorded: 12 January 2014; (Denver, Colorado, U.S.)
- Genre: Pop; R&B
- Length: 3:36
- Label: Syco; Columbia
- Songwriters: Ella Henderson; Ryan Tedder; Kenan Williams; Noel Zancanella
- Producers: Ryan Tedder; Noel Zancanella

Ella Henderson singles chronology
"Ghost" (2014)	"Glow" (2014)

Music video
- "Ghost" on YouTube

"Ghost" is the debut single by English singer and songwriter Ella Henderson. It was released on 8 June 2014 as the lead single from her debut studio album, Chapter One (2014). Henderson co-wrote the song with Kenan Williams and its producers, Ryan Tedder and Noel Zancanella.

The music video was filmed in New Orleans, Louisiana in March 2014. The song entered at number one on the UK Singles Chart, as well as in the Republic of Ireland. It has also peaked within the top ten of the charts in Australia, Austria, Germany, Hungary, Switzerland, Poland, New Zealand and South Africa.

Since its release, the song has sold over 1.8 million copies in the UK and in excess of one million in the US. It was also the sixth best-selling single of 2014 in the UK. It served as the main song in the romantic comedy My Dead Tinder Match. On 23 November 2020, Ghost has reached 100 million views on YouTube, being her first video to achieve that milestone.

== Background and recording ==
On 18 November 2012, Henderson finished in sixth place on the ninth series of The X Factor, despite being the favourite to win. On 15 December, whilst being interviewed on The Saturday Night Show in Ireland, she revealed that she had signed a record deal with Sony Music. On 22 January 2013, Henderson confirmed she had signed to Simon Cowell's record label Syco Music. Regarding her decision to sign with Syco, Henderson said, "The most important thing I was looking for was to be involved creatively, and which label presents me with the best team to bring the best out of me. The fact that Cowell is letting me be involved creatively is overwhelming."

"Ghost" was co-written by Henderson, Kenan Williams, OneRepublic frontman Ryan Tedder and record producer Noel Zancanella and produced by Tedder and Zancanella. The song was recorded at Tedder's recording studio in Denver by Smith Carlson on 12 January 2014, Henderson's 18th birthday. In March 2014, Henderson announced that it would be her debut single, and released on 8 June 2014. The song received its debut radio airplay on Capital FM on 10 May 2014. The song is played in the key of A major.

== Critical reception ==
Lewis Corner of Digital Spy gave the song a positive review, stating:

"The end result, Ella's first single 'Ghost', would make a worthy winner's launch, let alone someone who fell victim to the mid-series shock elimination. "I keep going to the river to pray/ 'Cos I need something that can wash out the pain," Henderson professes over stomping Americana-folk beats and taut guitar twangs, falling somewhere between the rootsy heart of Adele and the pop sensibility of Leona Lewis. It's dark, it's brooding and it's full of pain, but most importantly for Ella's concerns, it's an unforgettable debut."

== Chart performance ==
"Ghost" was commercially successful, entering at number one on the UK Singles Chart on 15 June, selling 132,000 copies in its first week on sale. The song remained number one in the UK for a second week, outselling 5 Seconds of Summer's "Don't Stop" by 3,000 copies. The single has been certified triple Platinum by the BPI for sales and streams of over 1,800,000 units in the UK. It was the sixth best-selling song of 2014 in the UK, selling 750,000 copies.

In the Republic of Ireland, the song debuted at the top of the Irish Singles Chart. It has also charted in the top 10 of the singles charts in Australia, Austria, Czech Republic, Germany, Hungary, New Zealand, Poland, Switzerland and South Africa.

"Ghost" debuted at number 75 on Billboard Hot 100. On the week ending January 24, 2015, the song jumped from number 41 to number 28. On the following week, it jumped to number 22 and rose from number 14 to number 10 on Hot Digital Songs and became her first top 10. As of January 31, 2015, it has sold over 1,000,000 copies in the US alone. The song peaked at number 11 on US Mainstream Top 40.

== Music videos ==
The official music video was filmed in New Orleans, Louisiana on 10 March 2014, directed by Charles Mehling. The video was released to YouTube on 23 April 2014. The video shows Henderson performing the track in a red-lit motel. All the while, an escaped convict accused of murder goes to confront the actual killer at the motel.

Another video was released for the Switch remix of the song on 14 April 2014. This video, directed by Jem Talbot, features a young woman (played by Samara Zwain) exploring an empty house and reminiscing on a relationship.

== Live performances ==
On 26 May 2014, Henderson performed "Ghost" for the first time on the first live semi-final of Britain's Got Talent. She also performed an acoustic cover for 4Music. Henderson also performed the song at the Capital Summertime Ball on 22 June. Henderson made her American television debut on 6 August as she performed "Ghost" on Good Morning America. She later made her Australian television debut on 18 August when she sang the song on The X Factor Australia. Henderson has also performed the song on Dick Clark's New Year's Rockin' Eve. Henderson also performed the song on the 14 February 2015 at the NBA All-Stars weekend.

It has also been performed on The Ellen DeGeneres Show, The Tonight Show Starring Jimmy Fallon, and The Voice in both the US and Germany. The song was covered three times by contestants on her origin show, The X Factor, in series 11—firstly by Only The Young at judges' houses, next by Paul Akister in the first live performance by a contestant in that series, and then by Andrea Faustini, who sang the song with Henderson in the celebrity duets round of the final.

== Track listing ==
Digital download – single
No.	Title	Length
1.	"Ghost"	3:36

CD single
No.	Title	Length
1.	"Ghost"	3:36
2.	"Ghost" (Switch Remix Radio Edit)	3:40

Digital download – remixes
No.	Title	Length
1.	"Ghost" (Switch Remix Radio Edit)	3:40
2.	"Ghost" (Kastle Remix Radio Edit)	3:36
3.	"Ghost" (Oliver Nelson Remix)	5:04

== Charts ==
=== Weekly charts ===
Chart (2014–2015)	Peak position
Australia (ARIA)	3
Austria (Ö3 Austria Top 40)	2
Belgium (Ultratop 50 Flanders)	28
Canada Hot 100 (Billboard)	12
Italy (FIMI)	67
Canada AC (Billboard)	5
Canada CHR/Top 40 (Billboard)	13
Canada Hot AC (Billboard)	6
Czech Republic Airplay (ČNS IFPI)	8
Czech Republic Singles Digital (ČNS IFPI)	9
Denmark (Tracklisten)	15
Europe (Euro Digital Songs)	1
Finland (Suomen virallinen lista)	20
Germany (GfK)	3
Greece (IFPI)	19
Hungary (Rádiós Top 40)	3
Hungary (Single Top 40)	6
Ireland (IRMA)	1
Netherlands (Dutch Top 40)	37
Netherlands (Single Top 100)	32
New Zealand (Recorded Music NZ)	4
Poland Airplay (ZPAV)	8
Romania (Airplay 100)	55
Scotland Singles (OCC)	1
Slovakia Airplay (ČNS IFPI)	3
Slovakia Singles Digital (ČNS IFPI)	13
Slovenia (SloTop50)	7
South Africa (EMA)	8
Sweden (Sverigetopplistan)	11
Switzerland (Schweizer Hitparade)	10
UK Singles (OCC)	1
US Billboard Hot 100	21
US Adult Contemporary (Billboard)	15
US Adult Pop Airplay (Billboard)	5
US Dance/Mix Show Airplay (Billboard)	20
US Pop Airplay (Billboard)	11

=== Year-end charts ===
Chart (2014)	Position
Australia (ARIA)	31
Austria (Ö3 Austria Top 40)	40
Germany (Official German Charts)	37
Hungary (Rádiós Top 40)	29
Hungary (Single Top 40)	60
Ireland (IRMA)	10
New Zealand (Recorded Music NZ)	33
Slovenia (SloTop50)	46
Sweden (Sverigetopplistan)	66
Switzerland (Schweizer Hitparade)	54
UK Singles (Official Charts Company)	6

Chart (2015)	Position
Canada (Canadian Hot 100)	48
Slovenia (SloTop50)	33
US Billboard Hot 100	93
US Adult Contemporary (Billboard)	36
US Adult Pop Songs (Billboard)	23

=== Decade-end charts ===
Chart (2010–2019)	Position
UK Singles (Official Charts Company)	84

== Certifications ==
Region	Certification	Certified units/sales
Australia (ARIA)	3× Platinum	210,000^{‡}
Germany (BVMI)	Platinum	400,000^{‡}
New Zealand (RMNZ)	2× Platinum	30,000^{*}
Sweden (GLF)	Gold	20,000^{‡}
Switzerland (IFPI Switzerland)	Gold	15,000^{^}
United Kingdom (BPI)	3× Platinum	1,800,000^{‡}
United States (RIAA)	Platinum	1,000,000^{‡}
Streaming
Denmark (IFPI Danmark)	Platinum	2,600,000^{†}
^{*} Sales figures based on certification alone.^{^} Shipments figures based on certification alone.^{‡} Sales+streaming figures based on certification alone.^{†} Streaming-only figures based on certification alone.

== Release history ==
Country	Date	Format	Label
Austria	6 June 2014	Digital download	Syco
Germany	6 June 2014	Digital download	Syco
Ireland	6 June 2014	Digital download	Syco
Switzerland	6 June 2014	Digital download	Syco
United Kingdom	8 June 2014	Digital download	Syco
France	9 June 2014	Digital download	Syco
Spain	9 June 2014	Digital download	Syco
Italy	10 June 2014	Digital download	Syco
Italy	25 July 2014	Contemporary hit radio	Sony Italy
United States	29 July 2014	Digital download	Columbia
Austria	29 August 2014	CD single	Syco
Germany	29 August 2014	CD single	Syco
Switzerland	29 August 2014	CD single	Syco
Northern Ireland	13 September 2021	CD Single	Syco

== See also ==
- If You Love Someone (2014), with the same chord scheme and similar instruments and nearly the same melody.
