= Glow (Ella Henderson song) =

Single by Ella Henderson

from the album Chapter One
- Released: 5 October 2014
- Recorded: 2013–14
- Genre: Pop
- Length: 3:48
- Label: Syco
- Songwriters: Camille Purcell; Steve Mac
- Producer: Mac

Ella Henderson singles chronology
| "Ghost" (2014) | "Glow" (2014) | "Yours" (2014) |

Music video
- "Glow" on YouTube

"Glow" is a song by English singer and songwriter Ella Henderson. It was released on 5 October 2014 as the second single from her debut studio album, Chapter One. The song was written by Camille Purcell and Steve Mac.

== Music video ==
The music video premiered on 12 August 2014. It features Ella and several other dancers performing on a dark field and then later a court yard.

== Track listing ==
Digital download – single
| No. | Title | Length |
|---|---|---|
| 1. | "Glow" | 3:48 |

Digital download – remixes
| No. | Title | Length |
|---|---|---|
| 1. | "Glow" (Full Intention Remix) | 5:31 |
| 2. | "Glow" (Seamus Haji Remix) | 3:22 |

== Charts ==
| Chart (2014) | Peak position |
|---|---|
| Australia (ARIA) | 49 |
| Ireland (IRMA) | 17 |
| New Zealand (Recorded Music NZ) | 26 |
| Scotland Singles (Official Charts) | 3 |
| UK Singles (Official Charts) | 7 |

== Certifications ==
| Region | Certification | Certified units/sales |
|---|---|---|
| United Kingdom (BPI) | Silver | 200,000^{‡} |
^{‡} Sales+streaming figures based on certification alone.

== Release history ==
| Country | Date | Format | Label |
|---|---|---|---|
| Australia | 19 September 2014 | Digital download | Syco |
| United Kingdom | 5 October 2014 | Digital download | Syco |
