= Mirror Man (Ella Henderson song) =

Single by Ella Henderson

from the album Chapter One
- Released: 8 March 2015
- Recorded: 2014
- Genre: Blues; funk
- Length: 3:42
- Label: Syco
- Songwriter(s): Ella Henderson; Laura Pergolizzi; Al Shux
- Producer(s): Al Shux

Ella Henderson singles chronology
"Yours" (2014)	"Mirror Man" (2015)	"Glitterball" (2015)

Music video
- "Mirror Man" on YouTube

"Mirror Man" is a song recorded by British singer and songwriter Ella Henderson for her debut studio album, Chapter One (2014). It was released in the UK on 8 March 2015 via Syco Music as the fourth single off the album. The song was written by Henderson, Al Shuckburgh, and Laura Pergolizzi, and was produced by Shuckburgh under his production moniker Al Shux. "Mirror Man" entered the UK Singles Chart at number 96.

== Content ==
"Mirror Man" is a mid-tempo blues and funk song whose lyrics discuss a selfish lover who puts him or herself before anyone else. Henderson revealed to the Official Charts Company that the song was written about "the most self-centred person I’ve ever met," and that she enjoys singing the tune due to its sassy attitude.

== Music video ==
The official music video for "Mirror Man" was directed by Colin Tilley and premiered on 9 March 2015. Henderson has described the aesthetic of the video as "graphic" and "edgy", noting that it shows a different side of herself. The video features a panther, whose shapeshifting is meant to symbolize the vanity of the titular "mirror man", and uses special effects to depict Henderson being consumed by fire, sand, and smoke, amongst other elements.

== Track listings ==
Digital download — Remixes EP

1. "Mirror Man" (Alex Adair Remix) – 3:39
2. "Mirror Man" (Henry Krinkle Remix) – 3:51
3. "Mirror Man" (the Golden Boy Remix) – 3:15

== Charts ==
=== Weekly charts ===
Chart (2015)	Peak position
Belgium (Ultratip Bubbling Under Flanders)	42
Belgium (Ultratop Dance Flanders)	31
Hungary (Rádiós Top 40)	14
Scotland (Official Charts Company)	54
UK Singles (OCC)	96

=== Year-end charts ===
Chart (2015)	Position
Hungary (Rádiós Top 40)	93

== Release history ==
Region	Date	Format	Label
United Kingdom	8 March 2015	Digital download	Syco
