= Raggatronic =

Studio album by Enur
- Released: September 9, 2008
- Genre: Reggae fusion; house; pop; dancehall
- Length: 38:26
- Label: Ultra
- Producer: Rune Reilly Kolsch; Johannes Torpe

Singles from Raggatronic
- 1. "Calabria 2008" Released: 2008; 2. "Bonfire" Released: 2009

Raggatronic is the debut album by dance music group Enur. The album features reggae vocalists Natasja and Natalie Storm, Majid, Beenie Man, Chopper City Boyz, Nicki Minaj, Michael Rune and Strange Boy.

The album is a result of the release of the single "Calabria 2008". Johannes Torpe got permission to remix Rune RK's 2003 instrumental hit song "Calabria". The remix received an overwhelming amount of attention and peaked at number nine in France, number three in Canada, number three in Portugal, and number 17 in the US and appeared in a commercial for the US mass merchandise retailer Target. The brothers decided to create an album that initially was only distributed in the US and Canada.

== Track listing ==
1. "Get Things Started" (featuring Majid) (3:39)
2. "Calabria 2007" (featuring Natasja) (3:51)
3. "Whine" (featuring Beenie Man) (3:42)
4. "Ucci Ucci" (featuring Nicki Minaj and Chopper City Boyz) (3:24)
5. "Gwaan" (featuring Natalie Storm) (3:41)
6. "You Like the Way" (featuring Strange Boy) (4:04)
7. "Dip and Fall" (featuring Natalie Storm) (3:30)
8. "Bonfire" (featuring Natasja) (3:39)
9. "Sweet Ram" (featuring Natalie Storm) (3:53)
10. "Champagne Campagne" (featuring Michael Rune) (5:03)
11. "Calabria 2008" (featuring Natasja) (3:58) (U.S. iTunes bonus track)
