= Johannes Torpe =

Danish designer and musician

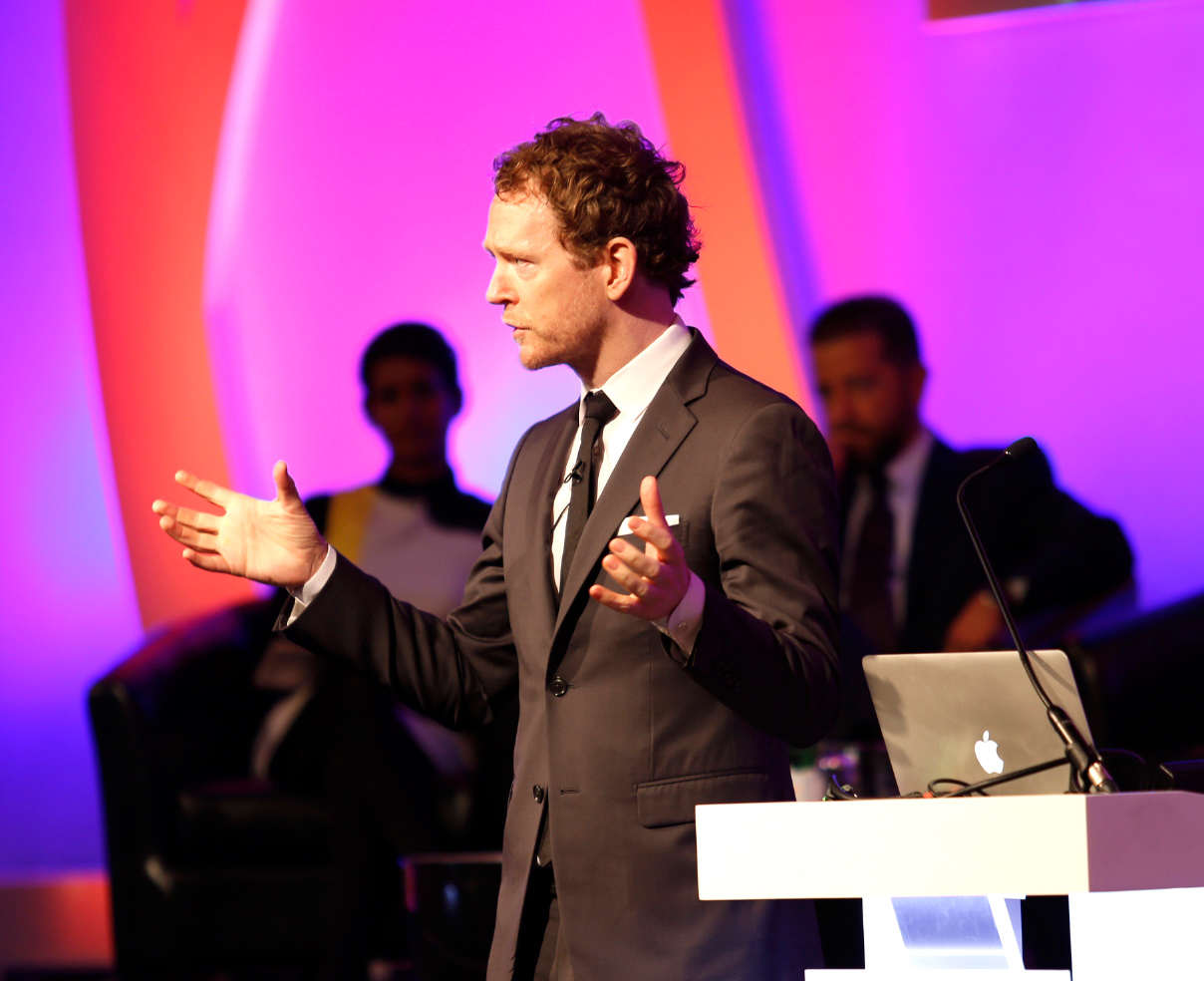
- Torpe in 2012
- Born: 5 January 1973 (age 53); Skanderborg, Denmark
- Occupations: Designer and musician
- Website: johannestorpe.com

Johannes Torpe (born 5 January 1973 in Skanderborg) is a Danish designer and musician. Since 1997, he has been the CEO and creative director of his eponymous design company, Johannes Torpe Studios, based in Copenhagen, Denmark. The studio's design philosophy takes an multi-disciplinary approach, and is concerned with creating, adaptive, open-minded, and mood-driven spaces.

As a designer, Torpe works in interior design, product design, furniture design, industrial design, and architecture. Torpe has received awards for several of his interior design projects such as NASA Night Club, Restaurant Levi in Copenhagen, and the United Cycling Lab & Store for ARGON 18 in Lynge. Projects outside Denmark include Restaurant South Beauty in Taipei, Restaurant Jing Yaa Tang in Beijing, and the Bucherer Store concept in Düsseldorf.

From 2011 to 2015 he was the creative director of Bang & Olufsen. He has also worked with several international companies, such as Nike, HAY, Haier, LG Electronics, Roberto Cavalli, Dolce & Gabbana and Skype. Torpe has also worked as a keynote speaker, giving talks about his design philosophy and the intersection between business and design. He has spoken at events held by Design Indaba, MIPIM, the New York Times, Savannah College of Art and Design, Ecole Hôtelière de Lausanne, and the Kennedy Space Center, among others.

== Early life ==
Johannes Torpe was born on 5 January 1973, in Skanderborg, Denmark to Danish artist Birgitte Elfrida Torpe and musician Patrick David Reilly. His mother, Birgitte, home-schooled Torpe until the fourth grade.

Growing up in the hippy commune Thylejren in Thy, he learned to harness his creativity at an early age and became an avid drummer. Torpe eventually grew tired of the commune's lifestyle and asked his mother for permission to move in with his aunt in Copenhagen at the age of 12. By 1986, he had gotten his first job in Copenhagen at DrumStick, a drumming store, to avoid going back to school. He worked there for five years, until the age of 19.

== Career ==
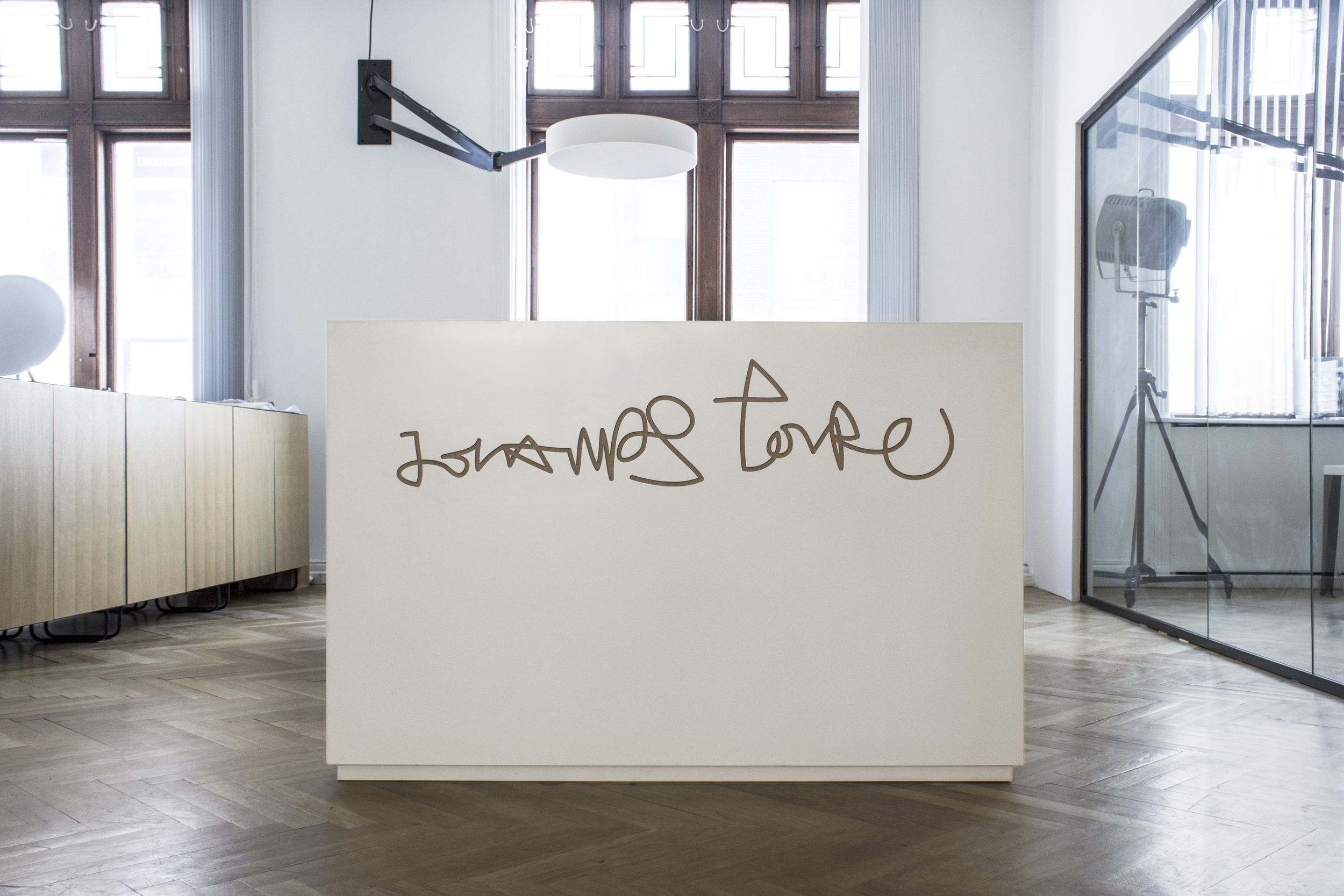
Johannes Torpe Studios in Copenhagen

In 1989, Torpe founded the lighting design company Fatfish which provided lighting for music festivals and concerts. After seven years in the lighting business, he sold the company. During this period, Torpe started graphic design. From 1994 to 1999, he was co-owner and designer of several Copenhagen nightclubs, including: NASA Nightclub, X-Ray, Le Kitch, Coffeeshoppen, Fever, and Pub Elvis. His work designing nightclubs in the 90s launched his design career. The NASA Nightclub was Torpe's first major interior design project, and came to define his style. The all-white interior is a futuristic ode to Stanley Kubrick's 2001: A Space Odyssey.

Torpe created the studio Turbo2000 Kunstkontrolle (since renamed Johannes Torpe Studios) and sold off the nightclubs and bars to his partners in 2000. In 2005, he was appointed external industrial design director for Skype. In 2009, he designed Danzka Vodka's rebrand, including a new logo and an aluminium bottle.

In 2011, Torpe was appointed creative director of Bang & Olufsen. During his time with the company, he introduced the sub-brand B&O Play. Torpe relinquished the role in October 2015. In 2011, he also designed the 500 kg seating system for Italian spHAUS and opened the WangTorpe Studios in Beijing with Chinese entrepreneur Xiaofei Wang. In 2012, he designed the Space Enabler series for the American company Haworth.

In 2015, he was awarded a Fellowship at the Department of Architecture at Westminster University, and RMIT University in Melbourne. In the following year, he explored the different drivers of change within a creative practice and the challenges and strengths of a relationship-based business model. In 2017, Torpe expanded into architectural work, through his design for the Red Mountain Spa & Wellness Resort in Iceland. The project was awarded a commendation in the Retail & Leisure category at the 2018 MIPIM AR Future Projects Awards. In 2018, his design for the United Cycling Lab and Store design in Lynge was also completed. For the project, he had retrofitted an industrial building from the 1990s to create futuristic retail experience for the display of high-performance bicycles from Argon 18. In 2019, he designed the Precious Chair and the Heartbreaker Sofa for the Italian design company Moroso. When presenting the collection during the Salone del Mobile in Milan, Torpe said that he "designed the Precious collection of chairs in a moment of love and happiness; the inspiration really did come from imagining a ring on a finger". The Heartbreaker Sofa is the opposite, as Torpe explains: "As an old saying goes, the greatest love songs are written by songwriters with broken hearts—that was also the case when I designed the Heartbreaker Sofa system. It may seem like a cliché, but it was in the scribbles during sleepless nights that this almost obvious shape took form, helping me to express my emotions through drawing."

=== 2020s ===
In 2020 Torpe designed the Buda Resort, 50 km North of Budapest, Hungary. As of 2023, the Buda Resort is still in development.

Together with the French company Alstom Transportation SA, Johannes Torpe Studios designed the new IC5 train for DSB, in 2021. The aim was to 'future-proof' the trains through timeless design, adopting simple forms and using high-quality materials. The train is scheduled to begin operations in the second half of 2024. Johannes Torpe Studios began developing one of it most extensive projects yet in 2022—the American Space Foundation Discovery Centre & HQ in Colorado Springs. The project involves the transformation of an old semiconductor factory into the public face of the Space Foundation. Intertwining many different programs, the project will create a seamless user experience, incorporating sensory immersive experiences while allowing all user groups to find their way around the building easily. As of 2023, the project is still in development.

In 2022, Torpe also designed the new Restaurant Levi in Copenhagen. The design of the space is inspired by Japanese and Milanese architecture, to reflect the restaurant's fusion cuisine. It has been featured in several international magazines.

== Musical career ==
Torpe began receiving international attention as a musician in the 2000s. He had cofounded the music production company, Artificial Funk in 2000. Performing as the duo Enur, Torpe and his half-brother Rune Reilly Kölsch won a Danish Music Award for the song Calabria in 2004. Three years later, they released a remix of the song featuring Danish reggae singer Natasja Saad. "Calabria 2007" enters the music charts in many countries and reaches number one on the Billboard Hot Dance Airplay chart 2008. The song earned the duo several Danish DJ Awards as well as the prestigious BMI award. Its success also led to an extensive live tour in the United States. Though Torpe has since focused his career on his design studio, rather than working as a professional drummer, percussionist and music producer, he remains an official signature artist for Tama Drums.

== Notable projects ==
=== NASA Night Club ===
The private members club NASA in Copenhagen was designed as a futuristic ode to Stanley Kubrick's 2001: A Space Odyssey which was heavily inspired by the space age. The club's name is intended as an acronym of "Nice And Safe Attitude". NASA was originally owned by Johannes Torpe, Kim Thurman, Morten Fabricius and Philip Lipski. It changed hands several times in the following years, before eventually closing in 2017.

When it opened in 1997, its design was kept strictly to white surfaces with outer space flowing elements and consistently soft, curved and inviting shapes, creating an atmosphere of exclusivity. All the details were designed bespokely for the club, from the ashtrays to the doors. The intention was for NASA to be an exclusive world of its own that both surprised and enclosed guests for a night, encouraging them forget about life outside. The staff wore spandex uniforms which drew from Kubrick's Space Odyssey. A girl in uniform hosted the glass elevator placed outside the building and took guests from street level to the club on the third floor, mimicking an actual space launch. Upstairs, guests were met by the reception designed with a large, white, organically shaped desk and an enormous aquarium at the back wall. Music was playing in the elevator; video screens were placed in the bathroom mirrors, and sounds from space were played in the toilet stalls.

=== SUPERGEIL ===
The restaurant and café SUPERGEIL opened in Copenhagen in 2001. Its design featured curving bright orange acoustic walls. The space was meant to evoke all senses, from sound and music, visual design, and food. SUPERGEIL eventually closed in 2005 and is now represented at the Danish Design Museum as Danish Design for the millennium.

=== Bang & Olufsen Nexus Flagship Store ===
The flagship store, Nexus, was envisioned as a revitalised Bang & Olufsen store design. The building was designed following the shapes and lines in the surrounding environment of the town square. The curved edges and corners provide an organic aesthetic that gives the building a charming and inviting presence. It was additionally inspired by the design of one of B&O Play's most popular speakers, the Beo Lit 15. Johannes Torpe Studios collaborated with local architect Lars Sternberg from Arkitect A/S to create the intricate exterior of the Nexus building.

=== Levi Restaurant ===
Reminiscent of 1930s Milan, while at the same time honouring Danish and Japanese aesthetics, the Levi Restaurant in central Copenhagen opened in 2022 between different yet overlapping traditions. From a Japanese design heritage, the clean wooden framework was created to bring depth to the dining room through simple and authentic design. Another conceptual pillar is the Italian design tradition of bold colours and shapes, making room for passion. Rich materials and saturated senses formed the foundation for design details, such as the marble and chrome bar elements and the contemporary interpretation of a classic Italian terrazzo floor.

The custom-designed Moroso furniture is elegantly oriented; inviting intimacy and breathing room, while allowing for engagement in the restaurant atmosphere. The custom seating, as well as the 'Precious' chairs designed by Johannes Torpe for Italian Moroso, are upholstered in a deep moss green wool fabric from Danish textile company Kvadrat, bringing together Danish design and Italian craftsmanship.

=== United Cycling Lab & Store ===
The United Cycling Lab & Store in Lynge was completed in 2018 by Johannes Torpe Studios. The store includes a product gallery, a workshop, a bike-fitting area, and training facilities. The full project also included office facilities, meeting rooms, a cantina, a storage facility and an outdoor plaza by the main entrance.

The architectural design follows a tight grid system that is introduced throughout the building and perhaps is most noticeable in the interior design. This choice reflects the products and provides a modular retail design. Concrete floors, bright white walls, custom built illuminated product display furniture and 6-meter ceiling heights with white luminous ceiling panels from the framework of the showroom.

Bicycles from Argon 18 are displayed in a retail experience that blends elements from the world of technology, engineering, mechanics and community. With the click of a button bikes can be lowered down for inspection by the customer. Five display elements with lit surfaces and a cabinet box allows customers to take a closer look and feel of the individual bike parts.

=== IC5 Train for DSB ===
The new train design was developed by Johannes Torpe Studios in collaboration with French rolling stock manufacturer Alstom for DSB. Its design was intended to 'future-proof' the trains through timeless design; adopting simple forms and using high quality materials. Over a two-year period cooperating with the Design and Styling team at Alstom, and during thousands of hours of intense work, Johannes Torpe Studios has created a timeless design, adopting simple forms, and high-quality materials, ensuring easy to maintain fixtures and fittings. Special attention was paid to the detail of the seating design, which pays tribute to the Danish design tradition and heritage. The train is scheduled to begin operations in the second half of 2024.

=== The Red Mountain Resort ===
The Red Mountain Resort was designed for the Icelandic property development company Festir in 2017. The project's completion was delayed due to the COVID-19 pandemic and as of 2023 is still under development. It was the first full scale architectural project designed by Johannes Torpe Studios and it was awarded a Commendation in the Retail & leisure category at the 2018 MIPIM Architectural Review Future Project Awards.

Situated on the Western peninsula of Snæfellsness, at the point where the river mouth runs out to the sea, the resort faces Snæfellsjokull, a glacier covered stratovolcano. The resort is designed as a retreat into nature, and its architecture intentionally exposes guests to its natural surroundings. It incorporates panoramic views, sky courts, and a lagoon which flows through the reception, blurring the line between outside and inside.

Johannes Torpe Studios were inspired to create a modern interpretation of Icelandic turf houses. The turf houses were wooden structures insulated by a thick wall of turf which were built by the first Norwegian settlers. To achieve a modern version of this, the building's was thought of in reverse, as if the construction had been turned inside-out. Concrete is the primary material used and was treated with a red pigment that mimics the hue of the surrounding landscape. The concrete was applied to create layers of contrasting rough and smooth textures and form patterns inspired by those found in the layers of the turf houses.

=== The Buda Resort ===
In 2020 Johannes Torpe Studios finished the design for the Buda Resort 50 km North of Budapest, in a hilly landscape surrounded by lush green forests, near the bank of the tortuous Danube River. The project involved retrofitting a derelict concrete building above an old stone quarry into a luxury spa and wellness resort with 210-rooms. As of 2023, the project is still under development as a result of the COVID-19 pandemic.

The hotel comprises a grand lobby area, two restaurants, café and deli, indoor and outdoor cocktail lounges, ballroom, and ten conference rooms with private gardens and outdoor areas. Six outdoor areas include yoga facilities in various settings, seven outdoor pools, two of which are thermic, and a green rooftop plaza; perfect for hosting intimate to large gatherings.

The Buda Resort design concept draws inspiration from its unique and sacred setting of Dobogó-kő, which in Hungarian means "beating stone", referring to the heart chakra of the earth. Based on the idea of a blossoming lotus flower, which is the universal symbol for the heart chakra, as well as refers to the floral motifs found in traditional Hungarian craftsmanship, the design explores the progression of 'opening up' – from earth to sky. The building itself unfolds and opens up like a flower from the heart of the building, to its extremities.

== Awards ==
- SIT Furniture Design Award, Winner in Restaurant & Bar Design – Levi Restaurant (2022)
- FRAME Awards, Multi Brand Store of the year – United Cycling Lab & Store (2019)
- D&AD Awards, Wood Pencil Winner – United Cycling Lab & Store (2019)
- Architizer A + Awards, Special Mention – United Cycling Lab & Store (2019)
- MIPIM, Commendation in the Retail & Leisure category – the Red Mountain Resort (2018)
- Archilovers, Best Project – Palæo Interior (2015)
- Top 100 Talents in Architecture and Interior Design operating in China by Architectural Digest (2013).
- Restaurant & Bar Design Awards, nominated for Best International Restaurant – South Beauty Taipei (2012)
- Danish Design Award, for the sofa 'Mormor', designed together with Rune Reilly Kølsch and produced by Hay (2007)
