= Al Hamra Tower =

Skyscraper in Kuwait City, Kuwait

- Burj Alhamra

- Location within Kuwait
- Former names: Al Hamra Firdous Tower

Record height
- Tallest in Kuwait since 2011^{[I]}
- Preceded by: Arraya Tower

General information
- Status: Completed
- Type: Offices, shopping mall
- Architectural style: Sculpted
- Location: 13085 Jaber Al-Mubarak Street, Kuwait City, Kuwait
- Coordinates: 29.3790°N 47.9932°E
- Elevation: 12 m (39 ft)
- Construction started: 2005
- Topped-out: 2010
- Completed: 2011
- Inaugurated: 2011
- Cost: $500 million
- Owner: Al Hamra Real Estate Co.

Height
- Architectural: 414 m (1,358 ft)
- Tip: 414 m (1,358 ft)
- Roof: 368 m (1,207 ft)
- Top floor: 83

Technical details
- Material: Concrete
- Floor count: 85
- Floor area: 290,000 m^{2} (3,100,000 ft^{2})
- Lifts/elevators: 43

Design and construction
- Architects: Gary Haney, Skidmore Owings & Merrill
- Architecture firm: Al Jazera Consultants, Kuwait
- Structural engineer: Skidmore Owings & Merrill
- Services engineer: BMT Fluid Mechanics Ltd. Momentive; Hitachi
- Main contractor: Ahmadiah Contracting and Trading Company
- Awards: 2012 Best Tall Building Middle East & Africa Finalist

Website
- www.alhamra.com.kw

References
- ^{[1]}

The Al Hamra Tower is a skyscraper in Kuwait City, Kuwait. It is the tallest building in Kuwait. Construction of the skyscraper started in 2005. It was completed in 2011. Designed by architectural firms Skidmore, Owings & Merrill and Ramshir and Callison, it is the tallest curved concrete skyscraper in the world, and the 40th tallest building in the world at 414 m (1,358 ft).

== Description ==
The building utilizes wrapped glass on the east, north, and west both for aesthetics and to reduce the amount of reflective surface area on the south facade, which also features brushed Jura limestone. Flared walls reaching from the southwest and southeast corners of the core span the entire height of the tower, and there is a column-free 24-meter-tall lobby.

The Tower also includes a restaurant, Francesca's.

The landscape of the tower was designed by Francis Landscapes.

The tower was included in the list of the best inventions of 2011 by Time magazine.

It is also the location of the Embassy of France and the Embassy of Germany on the 40th floor, and of the Delegation of the European Union.

== Awards ==
- 2011: Emporis Skyscraper Award
- 2010: Cityscape • Commercial / Mixed Use Built
- 2008: Chicago Athenaeum - American Architecture Award
- 2008: Chicago Athenaeum - International Architecture Award for best new global design
- 2008: MIPIM/Architectural Review - MIPIM Future Project Award: Overall
- 2008: MIPIM/Architectural Review - MIPIM Future Project Award: Tall Buildings
- 2007: Miami Architectural Bienal - Bronze Unbuilt Project

== See also ==
- List of tallest buildings in Kuwait
- Cayan Tower
