= Enur =

Danish electronic music duo

Enur / Artificial Funk
- Torpe (right) and Kolsch/Rune RK (left) being interviewed backstage at a show in Copenhagen, Denmark on May 30, 2008.

Background information
- Origin: Denmark
- Genres: EDM; house; reggae fusion
- Years active: 1995–2012
- Labels: Brother Brown, Skint, Ultra

Enur (also known as Artificial Funk) was a Danish electronic music duo.

== Career ==
Artificial Funk was initially an alias of Rune Reilly Kölsch in the 1990s; in 2000, he joined forces with half brother Johannes Torpe to form the duo. They initially achieved some notoriety by being signed to Skint Records in 2002. In 2003, Artificial Funk released the track "Together", written by Kölsch and Nellie Ettison which was nominated for the Top 10 Tracks of the Year by DJ Mag. It reached No. 67 on the Dutch Singles Chart.

Rune and Torpe have also founded the labels ArtiFarti Records (2005), Tattoorec.com (2006) and Nightology Records (2008). In addition, Torpe runs a design company through Johannes Torpe studios in addition to Toolroom Records.

Together they have won five DJ awards plus a Danish Grammy Award.

== As Enur ==
In 2007, Rune and Torpe, under the name Enur, scored a major club hit in 2007 with a new version of "Calabria" titled "Calabria 2007" featuring reggae vocalist and fellow Dane Natasja Saad. "Calabria 2007" peaked at No. 9 in France, as well becoming a hit in Belgium, Canada and Portugal. It crossed to American shores via New York dance label Ultra Records and charted on the Billboard Hot 100, gaining support from mainstream and rhythmic top 40, dance and Latin radio. It also went to No. 29 on the European Hot 100 singles chart. The song was eventually remixed again for their album, Raggatronic in 2008. The song also appeared in a commercial for Target.

Enur released Raggatronic on September 9, 2008, featuring guest artists such as Nicki Minaj, Beenie Man, Natasja Saad, Greg Nice, Majid, Natalie Storm and Chopper City Boyz. According to Billboard, the Caribbean, soul and electronic influences featured in "Calabria" are prominently featured on the album.

== Discography ==
=== Albums ===
- 2008: Sleep Less, Live More

=== Singles ===
- 1995: "Real Funk"
- 1996: "Zone One"
- 2000: "Use It (The Music)"
- 2001: "People Don't Know"
- 2002: "I Can't Help Myself"
- 2002: "Together" (with Nellie Ettison)
- 2005: "Never Alone"

=== As Enur ===
Album

- 2008: Raggatronic

Singles

- 2007: "Calabria 2007"
- 2012: "I'm That Chick" (featuring Nicki Minaj & Goonrock)
