= Say Say Say =

1983 single by Paul McCartney featuring Michael Jackson

Single by Paul McCartney featuring Michael Jackson

from the album Pipes of Peace
- B-side: "Ode to a Koala Bear"
- Released: 3 October 1983
- Recorded: May 1981 – April 1982
- Studio: AIR, London; Odyssey, London; Cherokee, Los Angeles; Sigma Sound, Los Angeles
- Genre: Post-disco; synth-funk; funk-pop; rock
- Length: 3:55; 5:40 (remix by John "Jellybean" Benitez)
- Label: Parlophone (UK); Columbia (US)
- Songwriters: Paul McCartney; Michael Jackson
- Producer: George Martin

Paul McCartney singles chronology
| "The Girl Is Mine" (1982) | "Say Say Say" (1983) | "Pipes of Peace" (1983) |

Michael Jackson singles chronology
| "P.Y.T. (Pretty Young Thing)" (1983) | "Say Say Say" (1983) | "Thriller" (1983) |

Music video
- "Say Say Say" on YouTube

"Say Say Say" is a song by the English singer-songwriter and musician Paul McCartney and the American singer-songwriter Michael Jackson, released in October 1983 as the lead single from McCartney's fifth solo studio album, Pipes of Peace (1983). Produced by George Martin, it was recorded during the production of McCartney's previous studio album, Tug of War (1982), about a year before the release of "The Girl Is Mine", their duet for Jackson's sixth studio album, Thriller (1982).

After its release in October 1983, "Say Say Say" became Jackson's seventh top-ten hit inside a year. It was a number-one hit in the United States (his sixth number-one single there), Canada, Norway, Sweden and several other countries, reached number two in the United Kingdom, and peaked within the top ten in Australia, Austria, New Zealand, the Netherlands, Switzerland and over 20 other nations. In 2013, Billboard magazine listed the song as the 41st biggest hit of all time on the Billboard Hot 100 chart. It has also been voted the ninth-best collaboration of all time in a Rolling Stone readers poll.

The single was certified platinum by the Recording Industry Association of America (RIAA) in December 1983, representing sales of one million copies. The single was promoted with an influential music video directed by Bob Giraldi. The short film centres around two con artists called "Mac and Jack" (played by McCartney and Jackson).

== Background, recording and composition ==
McCartney biographer Ray Coleman asserted that the majority of the song's lyrics were written by Jackson and given to McCartney the next day. Recording began at AIR Studios in London in May 1981. At the time, McCartney was recording Tug of War, his second solo album after the breakup of his group Wings.

Jackson stayed at the home of McCartney and his wife Linda during the recording sessions, and became friends with both. While at the dining table one evening, Paul McCartney brought out a booklet that displayed all the songs to which he owned the publishing rights. "This is the way to make big money," the musician informed Jackson. "Every time someone records one of these songs, I get paid. Every time someone plays these songs on the radio, or in live performances, I get paid." McCartney's words influenced Jackson's later purchase of ATV Music Publishing in 1985.

"Say Say Say"
"Say Say Say" is a pop song played in the key of B♭ minor. The track has been cited as a "pleading kind of love song".

McCartney played several instruments on "Say Say Say", including percussion, synthesizer and guitar (though it is not mentioned in the credits for the track). The harmonica was played by Chris Smith, the rhythm guitar was played by David Williams, Nathan Watts played bass and drums were played by Ricky Lawson. The song was engineered by former Beatles sound engineer, Geoff Emerick. Horns were overdubbed at Cherokee Studios in California in April 1982, and the production of "Say Say Say" was completed in Britain in February 1983.

As keyboard player Bill Wolfer recalled in a 2014 interview, he and Jackson worked on a rough sketch of the song based on the original acoustic demo with McCartney, Jackson's intention being to present the latter his vision for the song. This soon evolved into a 24-track studio recording with a rhythm section, horns and harmonica laid down, which Michael presented to McCartney instead and this was kept in the final version.

George Martin, who had worked with the Beatles, produced the song. He said of his experience with Jackson: "He actually does radiate an aura when he comes into the studio, there's no question about it. He's not a musician in the sense that Paul is ... but he does know what he wants in music and he has very firm ideas."

Jackson also spoke of the experience in his autobiography, Moonwalk. The younger singer revealed that the collaboration boosted his confidence, as Quincy Jones—producer of Thriller—was not present to correct his mistakes. Jackson added that he and McCartney worked as equals, stating, "Paul never had to carry me in that studio."

According to Musicnotes.com by Alfred Music Publishing, "Say Say Say" was performed in common time, with a dance beat of 116 beats per minute. It is in the key of B♭ minor and sung in a vocal range from F_{3} to B♭_{4}. The lyrics to "Say Say Say" reflect an attempt to "win back" a girl's affection; Deseret News considered the song to be a "pleading kind of love song".

== Release and critical reception ==
Following the release of Thriller and most of its singles, "Say Say Say" was released on 3 October 1983 by Parlophone in the UK and Columbia Records in the US. It remained atop Billboard's Hot 100 for six weeks and became Jackson's seventh top ten hit of 1983, breaking a record that until then was held jointly by the Beatles and Elvis Presley. As of 2023, it remains McCartney's final number one single on the Hot 100, either in a group or solo. Also in the US, "Say Say Say" reached number two on the R&B chart (behind "Time Will Reveal" by DeBarge) and number three on the Hot Adult Contemporary Tracks chart. Billboard also stated that the recording earned "top spot as Jackson's best-performing Hot 100 chart single" after leading the US charts for six weeks.

Although the song had peaked at number ten in the UK, it began to fall steadily; McCartney subsequently held an early weekday live television interview, where he discussed the song's music video. This, along with screenings of the video on Top of the Pops (which normally played only singles that were rising in the charts), The Tube and Noel Edmonds' The Late, Late Breakfast Show, helped propel the song to number two on the UK Singles Chart. "Say Say Say" reached number one in Norway and Sweden, and the single also reached the top ten in Austria, Australia, New Zealand, the Netherlands, and Switzerland. With wholesale shipments of at least one million units, the single was later certified platinum by the Recording Industry Association of America.

"Say Say Say" received mixed reviews from music critics. The lyrics were named the worst of 1983 by The Buffalo News's Anthony Violanti, while the Lexington Herald-Leader stated in a review of Pipes of Peace that, aside from "Say Say Say" and "The Man", "McCartney waste[d] the rest of the album on bathos and whimsy". The Los Angeles Times' Paul Grein also reviewed the McCartney album and opined that the singer had redeemed himself with the success of the "spunky" song "but plunged back into wimpdom with 'No More Lonely Nights'". Journalist Whitney Pastorek compared the song to McCartney's 1982 duet with Stevie Wonder, "Ebony and Ivory". She asserted that "Say Say Say" was a better song, and had a better "though slightly more nonsensical" music video, adding that the song had no "heavy-handed social content". Penn State's The Daily Collegian described the track as a good song, despite its ad nauseam broadcasts.

In a Rolling Stone review, the track was described as an "amiable though vapid dance groove". The reviewer, Parke Puterbaugh, added that it was an "instantly hit-bound froth-funk that tends, after all, toward banality". Music critic Nelson George stated that "Say Say Say" would not have "deserved the airplay it received without McCartney and Jackson". Salon.com later described the song as a "sappy duet" and said that McCartney had become a "wimpy old fart" to the music public. Billboard listed "Say Say Say" as Michael Jackson's all-time biggest Hot 100 single. In a 2007 article, a writer for the magazine Vibe listed "Say Say Say" as the 22nd greatest duet of all time. The writer commented that the song was "a true falsetto fantasy" and that it was "still thrilling to hear the sweet-voiced duo trade harmonies on the chorus". In 2005, Dutch musicians Hi Tack sampled "Say Say Say" on their debut single, "Say Say Say (Waiting 4 U)". The song featured Jackson's vocals from the original recording, plus McCartney's "Baby".

=== 2015 version ===
On 6 October 2015, McCartney released a new version of the song in which the vocal roles of him and Jackson are reversed. It was remixed by Steve Orchard and Mark "Spike" Stent. On the new version, which is over three minutes longer than the original, the opening of the first verse is sung by Jackson instead of McCartney. Orchard said of the remix: "Paul remembered that there were two unused lead vocal performances by Michael and himself. We rearranged the vocal sequence and inverted the original performance so that Michael opened the first verse instead of Paul, to give the song a different take to the original version." More specifically, Jackson sings the parts that McCartney had in the original, and vice versa, for much of the song. The track appears on the 2015 re-issue of Pipes of Peace. A radio edit of the new remix was released for streaming on 30 October 2015, while an instrumental version of it is available for download at paulmccartney.com. The radio edit was also later included on the compilation Pure McCartney.

To coincide with the release of the recording, McCartney released a new music video on his Facebook page on 6 October 2015. Directed and choreographed by Ryan Heffington, it featured a group of young dancers, filmed in black and white in Los Angeles neighbourhoods, with moves that are reminiscent of Michael Jackson's.

== Personnel ==
"Say Say Say"

- Paul McCartney – vocals, percussion, synthesizer, guitar
- Michael Jackson – vocals
- Chris Hammer Smith – harmonica
- David Williams – rhythm guitar
- Nathan Watts – bass
- Bill Wolfer – keyboards
- Linda McCartney, Eric Stewart – backing vocals
- Ricky Lawson – drums
- Jerry Hey, Ernie Watts, Gary E. Grant, Gary Herbig – horns

"Ode to a Koala Bear"

- Paul McCartney – vocals, bass, piano, electric guitar
- Chris Laurence – bass
- Paul Robinson – drums
- Linda McCartney, Eric Stewart – backing vocals

== Music video ==
=== Production, plot, and reception ===
The music video (or "short film") for "Say Say Say" was filmed in October 1983 and was directed by Bob Giraldi, who had previously directed Michael Jackson's music video for "Beat It". Cameo appearances in the video are made by McCartney's then wife Linda, as well as Jackson's older sister La Toya.

Rolling Stone quoted Bob Giraldi who recounted McCartney's nervousness about the project:

"Paul was terribly insecure about appearing next to Michael, in terms of dance" ... "And who wouldn't, if you're going to go onstage and be choreographed next to Michael Jackson?" "In all my years of working in film and commercials, I've worked with some of the worst divas and superstars of all time," said Giraldi. "Paul and Michael were not that."

According to La Toya Jackson, during filming of the video, the McCartneys were staying at a property named Sycamore Valley Ranch, 5 miles (8.0 km) from the town of Los Olivos, California, in the Santa Ynez Valley. Jackson visited them and expressed interest in someday buying the property. In 1988, he would do so, renaming it Neverland Ranch. The saloon portion was filmed at the 1880 Union Hotel in Los Alamos. McCartney flew in specifically for the filming. The video cost $500,000 to produce.

In the short film, the duo play "Mac and Jack", a pair of medicine show con men who sell a "miracle potion". The salesman (McCartney) offers Jackson the potion, and claims that it is "guaranteed to give you the strength of a raging bull". Jackson drinks the potion and challenges a large man (played by Sonny Barnes) to arm-wrestle. Unbeknownst to a watching crowd, the man—along with Linda—is also in on the scam. After Jackson wins the rigged contest, the crowd of people surge forward and buy the potion. Mac and Jack then donate all of the money earned from the scam to an orphanage. After this scene, McCartney and Jackson star as vaudeville performers who sing and dance at a bar. On stage, the duo appear in clown makeup at one point and quickly go through a number of costume changes. Jackson flirts with a young woman portrayed by his real-life sister La Toya. When law-enforcement officers appear at the back of the venue, Mac quickly starts a small fire onstage and Linda yells "Fire!", emptying the venue and allowing the group to escape via backstage (yet somehow finding time to change into tuxedos first). The video ends with Paul, Linda, and Michael as they drive off into the sunset. La Toya, who was handed a bunch of flowers by McCartney & Jackson, is left at the roadside.

The video also features appearances by director Giraldi as a pool shark who is conned by McCartney, Sonny Barnes (whose cameo was wrongly attributed to Mr. T) as the carriage driver, and Art Carney as an audience member for the vaudeville show.

Giraldi said of Jackson and McCartney, "Michael didn't outdance Paul, and Paul didn't outsing Michael". He added that production of the video was hard work because "the egos could fill a room". The video introduced both dialogue and storyline, an element extended upon in Michael Jackson's Thriller. In a 1984 study of music videos conducted by the National Coalition on Television Violence, the Jacksons were rated "very violent", citing Michael Jackson's "Billie Jean", "Thriller" and "Say Say Say" as well as Jermaine Jackson's "Dynamite" and the Jacksons' "Torture". In a list compiled by Billboard at the end of 1984, the music video was named the fourth best of the year, and the rest of the top four were also short films by Jackson.

The Manchester Evening News later described the "Say Say Say" video as an "anarchic caper" that "plays out like an Emir Kusturica feature". PopMatters stated that the music videos of "Say Say Say" and "Goodnight Tonight" turned "a pair of otherwise forgettable songs into something worth watching". Steven Greenlee of The Boston Globe reflected that the video was both "horrifying and compelling", and stated the ridiculousness of a potion which could aid Jackson in beating somebody at arm wrestling. He added, "It's even harder to believe that the two of them didn't get the pulp beaten out of them in that bar for dressing like a pair of Chess King employees." The "Say Say Say" video was later included on the DVDs The McCartney Years and Michael Jackson's Vision.

=== Themes ===
Two authors later reviewed the short film and documented two central themes. The first is a "Child/Man" theme; the role of both a boy and an adult, which writer James M. Curtis states Jackson plays throughout the music video for "Say Say Say". Curtis writes that the bathroom scene involving the shaving foam is reminiscent of boys copying their fathers. He adds that the scene marks "the distinction between Michael's roles as a Child and as a Man". The writer also highlights the part where the singer supposedly becomes strengthened with a miracle potion, a further play on the "Child/Man" theme. Furthermore, Curtis observes that Paul and Linda McCartney seem to act as if they are Jackson's parents in the short film. The author also notes that in a scene where Jackson is handed a bouquet of flowers from a girl, it is a reversal of one from City Lights, a 1931 film starring Charlie Chaplin, whom the singer greatly adored.

The second of the two main themes in the music video is of African American history and culture, as some of the vaudeville scenes in the short film acknowledge minstrel shows and blackface. Author W. T. Lhamon writes that the video is set in the Great Depression, and that McCartney and Jackson "convey a compactly corrupt history of blackface" as they con their way to riches with the Mac and Jack show. Lhamon was critical of the pair and of the video because he felt that the African American theme had not been made explicitly known. The author expressed his view that aspects of the short film were historically out-of-synch with interracial relations. He stated, "Nearly everything in the video is backward. Mack's white hand continually helping black Jack on board, for instance, reverses the general process I have shown of blacks providing whites with their sustaining gestures." Lhamon added, "In a just world, Jackson should be pulling McCartney onto the wagon, not the other way around."

== Track listing ==
- UK 7" single
1. "Say Say Say" (with Michael Jackson) – 3:55
2. "Ode to a Koala Bear" – 3:45
- US 12" single
1. "Say Say Say" (John "Jellybean" Benitez Remix) (with Michael Jackson) – 5:40
2. "Say Say Say" (John "Jellybean" Benitez Remix Instrumental) (with Michael Jackson) – 7:00
3. "Ode to a Koala Bear" – 3:45
- 2015 transparent vinyl reissue
1. "Say Say Say" (2015 Remix) (with Michael Jackson) – 7:00
2. "Say Say Say" (John "Jellybean" Benitez Remix Instrumental) (with Michael Jackson) – 7:00
- Digital streaming
1. "Say Say Say" (2015 Remix / Radio Edit) (with Michael Jackson) – 3:41
- Digital download – via paulmccartney.com
1. "Say Say Say" (2015 Remix / Radio Edit Instrumental) (with Michael Jackson) – 3:41

== Charts ==
=== Weekly charts ===
Weekly chart performance for "Say Say Say"
| Chart (1983–1984) | Peak position |
|---|---|
| Australia (Kent Music Report) | 4 |
| Austria (Ö3 Austria Top 40) | 10 |
| Belgium (Ultratop 50 Flanders) | 2 |
| Bolivia (UPI) | 1 |
| Canada Top Singles (RPM) | 1 |
| Canada AC (RPM) | 2 |
| Canada (The Record) | 1 |
| Chile (UPI) | 6 |
| Finland (Suomen virallinen singlelista) | 1 |
| Finland Jukebox (Suomen virallinen singlelista) | 4 |
| Germany (Official German Charts) | 12 |
| Ireland (IRMA) | 3 |
| Italy (Musica e dischi) | 1 |
| Japan (Oricon) | 16 |
| Netherlands (Single Top 100) | 8 |
| New Zealand (Recorded Music NZ) | 10 |
| Norway (VG-lista) | 1 |
| Peru (UPI) | 1 |
| South Africa (Springbok) | 3 |
| Spain (PROMUSICAE) | 1 |
| Sweden (Sverigetopplistan) | 1 |
| Switzerland (Schweizer Hitparade) | 2 |
| UK Singles (OCC) | 2 |
| US Billboard Hot 100 | 1 |
| US R&B Singles Chart | 2 |
| US Billboard Adult Contemporary | 3 |
| US Cash Box | 1 |
| US Album Rock Tracks | 24 |
| US Radio & Records CHR/Pop Airplay Chart | 1 |
| Venezuela (UPI) | 3 |

Weekly chart performance
| Chart (2026) | Peak position |
|---|---|
| Croatia International Airplay (Top lista) | 86 |

=== Year-end charts ===
1983 year-end chart performance for "Say Say Say"
| Chart (1983) | Rank |
|---|---|
| Australia (Kent Music Report) | 57 |
| UK Singles (Official Charts Company) | 22 |

1984 year-end chart performance for "Say Say Say"
| Chart (1984) | Rank |
|---|---|
| Australia (Kent Music Report) | 83 |
| Canada Top Singles (RPM) | 39 |
| South Africa (Springbok) | 14 |
| US Hot 100 (Billboard) | 3 |

=== Decade-end charts ===
Decade-end chart performance for "Say Say Say"
| Chart (1980–1989) | Position |
|---|---|
| US Billboard Top Songs of the 80s | 8 |

=== All-time charts ===
All-time chart performance for "Say Say Say"
| Chart (1958–2021) | Position |
|---|---|
| US Billboard Hot 100 | 50 |

== Certifications ==
Certifications for "Say Say Say"
| Region | Certification | Certified units/sales |
|---|---|---|
| Canada (Music Canada) | Platinum | 100,000^{^} |
| France (SNEP) | Gold | 500,000^{*} |
| United Kingdom (BPI) 1983 release | Silver | 250,000^{^} |
| United Kingdom (BPI) 2007 release | Silver | 200,000^{‡} |
| United States (RIAA) | Platinum | 1,000,000^{^} |
^{*} Sales figures based on certification alone.^{^} Shipments figures based on certification alone.^{‡} Sales+streaming figures based on certification alone.

== Kygo version ==
"Say Say Say"

Single by Kygo, Paul McCartney and Michael Jackson
- Released: 31 March 2023
- Genre: Tropical house
- Length: 2:55
- Label: Sony
- Songwriters: Michael Jackson; Paul McCartney
- Producers: Kygo; George Martin

Kygo singles chronology
| "Woke Up in Love" (2022) | "Say Say Say" (2023) | "Whatever" (2024) |

Paul McCartney singles chronology
| "Women and Wives" (2022) | "Say Say Say" (2023) | "Let It Be" (2023) |

Michael Jackson singles chronology
| "Diamonds Are Invincible" (2018) | "Say Say Say" (2023) |

On 31 March 2023, Norwegian DJ Kygo released a remake of the song. It marks Kygo's fourth remix released as a single following "Higher Love" (2019), "What's Love Got to Do with It" (2020), and "Hot Stuff" (2020).

=== Charts ===
==== Weekly charts ====
Weekly chart performance for "Say Say Say" by Kygo
| Chart (2023) | Peak position |
|---|---|
| Belgium (Ultratop 50 Wallonia) | 33 |
| CIS Airplay (TopHit) | 14 |
| France (SNEP) | 78 |
| Hungary (Editors' Choice Top 40) | 25 |
| Japan Hot Overseas (Billboard Japan) | 17 |
| New Zealand Hot Singles (RMNZ) | 38 |
| Norway (VG-lista) | 16 |
| Russia Airplay (TopHit) | 9 |
| Sweden (Sverigetopplistan) | 41 |
| Ukraine Airplay (TopHit) | 2 |
| US Hot Dance/Electronic Songs (Billboard) | 16 |

==== Monthly charts ====
Monthly chart performance for "Say Say Say" by Kygo
| Chart (2023) | Peak position |
|---|---|
| Russia Airplay (TopHit) | 12 |
| Ukraine Airplay (TopHit) | 4 |

==== Year-end charts ====
Year-end chart performance for "Say Say Say" by Kygo
| Chart (2023) | Position |
|---|---|
| Russia Airplay (TopHit) | 49 |
| Ukraine Airplay (TopHit) | 80 |

=== Certifications ===
Certifications for "Say Say Say" by Kygo
| Region | Certification | Certified units/sales |
|---|---|---|
| France (SNEP) | Gold | 100,000^{‡} |
^{‡} Sales+streaming figures based on certification alone.

== See also ==
- List of Billboard Hot 100 number-one singles of 1983
- List of Billboard Hot 100 number-one singles of 1984
- "Say Say Say (Waiting 4 U)" by Hi Tack

== Bibliography ==
- Andersen, Christopher P. (1994). Michael Jackson: unauthorized. Simon & Schuster. ISBN 0-671-89239-8.
- Barrow, Tony (1994). Inside the Music Business. Routledge. ISBN 0-415-13660-1.
- Campbell, Lisa (1993). Michael Jackson: The King of Pop. Branden. ISBN 0-8283-1957-X.
- Coleman, Ray (1996). McCartney: Yesterday and Today. Dove Books. ISBN 0-7871-1038-8.
- Curtis, James M. (1987). Rock Eras. Popular Press. ISBN 0-87972-369-6.
- Everett, Walter (1999). The Beatles as musicians: Revolver through the Anthology. Oxford University Press. ISBN 0-19-512941-5.
- George, Nelson (2004). Michael Jackson: The Ultimate Collection booklet. Sony BMG.
- Grant, Adrian (2009). Michael Jackson: The Visual Documentary. Omnibus Press. ISBN 978-1-84938-261-8.
- Halstead, Craig (2007). Michael Jackson: For the Record. Authors OnLine. ISBN 978-0-7552-0267-6.
- Harry, Bill (2002). The Paul McCartney Encyclopedia. Virgin. ISBN 0-7535-0716-1.
- Hill, Tim (2000). The Beatles: unseen archives. Parragon. ISBN 0-7525-4080-7.
- Jackson, Michael (2009). Moonwalk. Random House Inc. ISBN 978-0-307-71698-9.
- Jones, Jel (2005). Michael Jackson, the King of Pop: The Big Picture: the Music! the Man! the Legend! the Interviews!. Amber Books Publishing. ISBN 0-9749779-0-X.
- Lhamon, W. H. (1998). Raising Cain. Harvard University Press. ISBN 0-674-74711-9.
- Romanowski, Patricia (1995). The New Rolling Stone encyclopedia of rock & roll. Fireside. ISBN 0-684-81044-1.
- Taraborrelli, J. Randy (2004). The Magic and the Madness. Headline. ISBN 0-330-42005-4.
