= 21 Reasons =

Single by Nathan Dawe featuring Ella Henderson
- Released: 29 April 2022
- Length: 2:35
- Label: Atlantic UK; Warner UK
- Songwriters: Ella Henderson; John Nicholas Ealand Morgan; Maegan Cottone; Nathan John Dawe; Rune Reilly Koelsch; William Martyn Lansley
- Producers: Nathan Dawe; Punctual

Nathan Dawe singles chronology
"Way Too Long" (2021)	"21 Reasons" (2022)	"Sweet Lies" (2022)

Ella Henderson singles chronology
"Crazy What Love Can Do" (2022)	"21 Reasons" (2022)	"All for You" (2022)

Music video
- "21 Reasons" on YouTube

"21 Reasons" is a song by British DJ/producer Nathan Dawe featuring vocals from British singer-songwriter Ella Henderson. It was released on 29 April 2022 by Atlantic Records (UK) and Warner UK for digital download and streaming. Written by Henderson, John Nicholas Ealand Morgan, Maegan Cottone, Dawe, Rune Reilly Koelsch and William Martyn Lansley, with production from Dawe and Punctual, "21 Reasons" features a prominent sample of Rune's 2003 dance song "Calabria". It is Henderson's second collaboration with Dawe since co-writing and having uncredited vocals on Dawe's 2020 single "Lighter" with rapper KSI.

== Background and release ==
Ella Henderson previously collaborated with Nathan Dawe on the song "Lighter" with rapper KSI. "Lighter", which was released as a single in 2020, featured uncredited vocals, and was co-written by Henderson. The Official Charts Company's George Griffiths noted the song's prominent sample of Rune's 2003 dance song "Calabria", also notable for its sample in Alex Gaudino's 2007 single "Destination Calabria". Speaking to Griffiths, Dawe noted that it had been "a while since he released anything" and therefore took his time to come up with the right song. He also said that the sample took a long time to clear.

Explaining about his inspiration for the sample, Dawe said he was inspired as a fan of Gaudino's "Destination Calabria" but knew he needed to do it justice if he wanted to work with that song. Aside from the sample, the song featured lyrics and verses that speak of the 21 reasons why someone is loved. Speaking about how Henderson became involved in the song, Dawe said they had kept in touch after working together on "Lighter" and that upon finishing the demo it was Henderson that sprung to his mind. He wanted to feature her "unfiltered vocals" unlike those "chipmunk vocals" on "Lighter". The duo wrote the lyrics in two hours over Zoom. Ahead of the song's release on 29 April, Dawe and his label partnered with TikTok influencers to build up anticipation for the song. Dawe said that despite the single not being out, during an early set people were able to sing the lyrics back to him when he played the song. Throughout May, June and July 2022, "21 Reasons" was promoted with a number of remixes including an acoustic version, as well as remixes by Toyboy & Robin, Lusso, Billen Ted, and Alle Farben.

== Chart performance ==
On the Official UK Singles Chart for 2 June 2022, the single jumped up 21 places into the top 20 from number 41, making it Henderson's second simultaneous top-twenty single; "Crazy What Love Can Do", Henderson's collaboration with Becky Hill and David Guetta was placed at number 14. A week later, "21 Reasons" was charting alongside the song "Je M'appelle" by London drill music artist Benzz. The latter song was also built around the same Rune RK sample "Calabria". On the UK Singles Chart dated 17 June 2022, Carl Smith of the Official Charts Company noted that "heatwave weather" in the UK had contributed to dance songs receiving a boost on the charts. At the time, both of Henderson's collaborations were still charting, "Crazy What Love Can Do" reached a new peak of 12, while "21 Reasons" sat at number 14. As a result, "21 Reasons" became Dawe's 2nd UK top-ten single and Henderson's 6th. On the UK Dance Singles Chart, "21 Reasons" peaked at number four on the week dated 17 June 2022. After dipping one place for two weeks, it rebounded to number four again on 8 July 2022, where it remained for a further five weeks. During this time, Henderson's other collaboration "Crazy What Love Can Do" remained one position ahead of "21 Reasons".

== Music video ==
At the time of the song's release, Dawe confirmed that a music video had not been shot but said he was open to working on one so long as he was not dancing in it. On 29 April 2022, a lyric video for the song was released. A second lyric video for the acoustic version song was unveiled on 27 May 2022. Just under a month later, it was revealed that Dawe and Henderson were filming a video for "21 Reasons" in Ibiza. The duo announced a series of YouTube Shorts teasing the video in the countdown to 1 July when the full video would be released.

== Track listings ==
Digital single

1. "21 Reasons" (featuring Ella Henderson) – 2:35

Digital acoustic single

1. "21 Reasons" (acoustic; featuring Ella Henderson) – 2:47
2. "21 Reasons" (featuring Ella Henderson) – 2:35

Digital Single – Toyboy & Robin Remix

1. "21 Reason" (featuring Ella Henderson; Toyboy & Robin Remix) – 3:05
2. "21 Reasons" (featuring Ella Henderson) – 2:35

Digital Single – Lusso Remix

1. "21 Reason" (featuring Ella Henderson; Lusso Remix) – 2:42
2. "21 Reasons" (featuring Ella Henderson) – 2:35

Digital Single – Billen Ted Remix

1. "21 Reason" (featuring Ella Henderson; Billen Ted Remix) – 2:26
2. "21 Reasons" (featuring Ella Henderson) – 2:35

Digital Single – Alle Farben Remix

1. "21 Reason" (featuring Ella Henderson; Alle Farben Remix) – 2:54
2. "21 Reasons" (featuring Ella Henderson) – 2:35

== Personnel ==
- Maegan Cottone – vocal production
- Nathan Dawe – producer, programming
- Ella Henderson – lead vocals
- Stuart Hawkes – mastering
- Punctual – producer (Note: Punctual is credited as a producer on all versions of the song, but is the sole producer on the acoustic version.)
- James F Reynolds – mixing

== Charts ==
=== Weekly charts ===
Weekly chart performance for "21 Reasons"
Chart (2022)	Peak position
Czech Republic Airplay (ČNS IFPI)	18
France (SNEP)	124
Germany (GfK)	66
Germany Dance (Official German Charts)	14
Global 200 Excl. US (Billboard)	138
Greece International (IFPI)	54
Hungary (Rádiós Top 40)	11
Hungary (Single Top 40)	24
Ireland (IRMA)	8
Mexico Airplay (Billboard)	3
Netherlands (Dutch Top 40)	25
Netherlands (Single Top 100)	33
Poland Airplay (ZPAV)	16
Russia Airplay (TopHit)	6
Slovakia Airplay (ČNS IFPI)	12
Slovakia Singles Digital (ČNS IFPI)	61
Sweden Heatseeker (Sverigetopplistan)	2
UK Singles (Official Charts)	9
UK Dance (Official Charts)	4
US Hot Dance/Electronic Songs (Billboard)	13

=== Monthly charts ===
Monthly chart performance for "21 Reasons"
Chart (2022)	Peak position
Russia Airplay (TopHit)	9

=== Year-end charts ===
Year-end chart performance for "21 Reasons"
Chart (2022)	Position
Hungary (Rádiós Top 40)	100
Poland (ZPAV)	98
Russia Airplay (TopHit)	63
UK Singles (OCC)	55
US Hot Dance/Electronic Songs (Billboard)	58

== Certifications ==
Certifications for "21 Reasons"
Region	Certification	Certified units/sales
Denmark (IFPI Danmark)	Gold	45,000^{‡}
France (SNEP)	Gold	100,000^{‡}
Italy (FIMI)	Gold	50,000^{‡}
New Zealand (RMNZ)	Gold	15,000^{‡}
Poland (ZPAV)	Platinum	50,000^{‡}
Spain (Promusicae)	Gold	30,000^{‡}
United Kingdom (BPI)	Platinum	600,000^{‡}
^{‡} Sales+streaming figures based on certification alone.

== Release history ==
Release history for "21 Reasons"
Region	Date	Format	Version	Label	Ref.
Various	29 April 2022	Digital download; streaming	Original	Atlantic UK; Warner UK	
Various	27 May 2022	Digital download; streaming	Acoustic	Atlantic UK; Warner UK	
Various	16 June 2022	Digital download; streaming	Toyboy & Robin Remix	Atlantic UK; Warner UK	
Various	8 July 2022	Digital download; streaming	Lusso Remix	Atlantic UK; Warner UK	
Various	15 July 2022	Digital download; streaming	Billen Ted Remix	Atlantic UK; Warner UK	
Various	22 July 2022	Digital download; streaming	Alle Farben Remix	Atlantic UK; Warner UK	
