= Say Say Say (Waiting 4 U) =

2006 single by Hi_Tack

Single by Hi_Tack
- B-side: "Beats 4 U"
- Released: 16 January 2006
- Length: 2:44
- Label: Spinnin'
- Songwriters: Paul McCartney, Michael Jackson
- Producer: Koen Groeneveld, Addy van der Zwan

Hi_Tack singles chronology
"Say Say Say (Waiting 4 U)" (2006)	"Let's Dance" (2007)

"Say Say Say (Waiting 4 U)" is a song by Dutch house music group Hi_Tack, released in the United Kingdom on 16 January 2006. It samples the 1983 song "Say Say Say" by Paul McCartney and Michael Jackson. The song peaked at number three in Finland, number four in the United Kingdom, and number eight in Ireland.

== Track listings ==
Dutch CD single

1. "Say Say Say (Waiting 4 U)" (radio mix)
2. "Say Say Say (Waiting 4 U)" (original)
3. "Say Say Say (Waiting 4 U)" (Delano & Crockett's Late Nite dub mix)
4. "Beats 4 U"

UK CD single

1. "Say Say Say (Waiting 4 U)" (radio edit)
2. "Say Say Say (Waiting 4 U)" (original)
3. "Say Say Say (Waiting 4 U)" (Tocadisco's Not Guilty remix)
4. "Beats 4 U"
5. "Say Say Say (Waiting 4 U)" (video)

UK 12-inch single

A1. "Say Say Say (Waiting 4 U)" (original mix) – 7:34
A2. "Say Say Say (Waiting 4 U)" (Tocadisco's Not Guilty remix) – 5:51
B1. "Say Say Say (Waiting 4 U)" (Patric & Timo remix) – 6:08

Australian CD single

1. "Say Say Say (Waiting 4 U)" (radio edit)
2. "Say Say Say (Waiting 4 U)" (original)
3. "Say Say Say (Waiting 4 U)" (Tocadisco's Not Guilty remix)
4. "Say Say Say (Waiting 4 U)" (Delano & Crockett's Late Nite dub mix)
5. "Beats 4 U"

== Charts ==
=== Weekly charts ===
Chart (2006–2007)	Peak position
Australia (ARIA)	50
Austria (Ö3 Austria Top 40)	65
Belgium (Ultratop 50 Flanders)	21
Belgium (Ultratop 50 Wallonia)	33
CIS Airplay (TopHit); Tocadisco radio mix	11
Czech Republic Airplay (ČNS IFPI)	11
Denmark (Tracklisten)	18
Europe (Eurochart Hot 100)	9
Finland (Suomen virallinen lista)	3
France (SNEP)	35
Germany (GfK)	39
Hungary (Dance Top 40)	6
Hungary (Editors' Choice Top 40)	5
Ireland (IRMA)	8
Netherlands (Dutch Top 40)	12
Netherlands (Single Top 100)	15
Russia Airplay (TopHit); Tocadisco radio mix	9
Scotland Singles (Official Charts)	7
Sweden (Sverigetopplistan)	42
Switzerland (Schweizer Hitparade)	59
Ukraine Airplay (TopHit); Tocadisco radio mix	186
UK Singles (Official Charts)	4
UK Dance (Official Charts)	1
UK Indie (Official Charts)	1

Chart (2013)	Peak position
Ukraine Airplay (TopHit); Tocadisco radio mix	168

=== Year-end charts ===
Chart (2006)	Position
CIS Airplay (TopHit)	41
Europe (Eurochart Hot 100)	91
Netherlands (Dutch Top 40)	52
Russia Airplay (TopHit)	35
UK Singles (OCC)	61

== Certifications ==
Certifications for "Say Say Say (Waiting 4 U)"
Region	Certification	Certified units/sales
United Kingdom (BPI)	Silver	200,000^{‡}
^{‡} Sales+streaming figures based on certification alone.

== Release history ==
Region	Date	Format	Label	Ref.
United Kingdom	16 January 2006	CD	Gusto	
Australia	20 February 2006	CD	Tinted	
