= Klubbheads =

Dutch DJ duo

- Also known as: Drunkenmunky, Hi_Tack, The Ultimate Seduction, Greenfield, Da Klubb Kings, several others
- Origin: Rotterdam, Netherlands
- Genres: House; UK hard house; progressive house; trance; nu-disco; eurodance; techno; hardcore; jumpstyle; hardbass
- Occupations: Producers; DJs
- Years active: 1990–present
- Labels: Digidance, Blue
- Members: DJ/producers: Koen Groeneveld; Addy van der Zwan; MCs: MC Huhgie Babe; MC Martin Harder
- Past members: Jan Voermans
- Website: www.facebook.com/klubbheadsworld

Drunkenmunky – Yeah! (2004)

Drunkenmunky – E (2002)

Klubbheads is a team of dance music producers and DJs from the Netherlands. They have more than 40 aliases for their recordings, including Hi_Tack, DJ Disco and Drunkenmunky.

== History ==
Koen Groeneveld (DJ Boozy Woozy) and Addy van der Zwan (Itty Bitty) first worked together in the Turn Up the Bass series of commercial mixes. They started producing music in the 1990s before meeting up with Jan Voermans (Greatski) in 1995. The trio created the sublabel Blue Records for parent Mid-Town Records to release their tracks as Klubbheads. In 1996, they had their first mainstream chart hit with "Klubbhopping", which reached #10 in the UK Singles Chart in May. It was followed up with two other entries into the top 40, in August 1997 with "Discohopping" (#35) and in August 1998 with "Kickin' Hard" (#36). In 1999, they co-produced "The Launch" for compatriot DJ Jean, reaching #2 in September. At this time they also split up from Blue Records to found the label Digidance.

They scored a Billboard Hot Dance Airplay hit in 2003 with "E" (which samples Eminem's "Without Me") under the Drunkenmunky name. In other countries, it was released under the title "E (As in Eveline)" without the use of the "Without Me" sample. Their song "Yeah!" samples the crunk hit "Yeah!" by Usher to a similar success. In 2005, they sampled Rune RK's "Calabria" under the name Dirty Laundry.

As Hi_Tack, they have released a remix of "Say Say Say" in 2006, a track originally by Paul McCartney and Michael Jackson (now renamed to "Say Say Say (Waiting 4 U)"), which reached #4 on the UK Singles Chart. The track entered Billboard's Hot Dance Airplay chart in the United States, where it debuted at #18 for the week ending 6 March 2006. They have also remixed Filter Funk's cover of the Police song, "Message in a Bottle".

Voermans elected to end their partnership in the spring of 2005 after ten years of collaboration. Groeneveld and van der Zwan continue to work together under a new label, Unit 54, while Voermans remains with Digidance.

== Discography ==
=== Klubbheads ===
Year	Single	Peak chart positions					
Year	Single	FIN	FRA	GER	NED	SWE	UK
1995	"Cha Cha"	—	—	—	—	—	—
1995	"Work This Pussy"	—	—	—	—	—	—
1996	"The Magnet"	—	—	—	—	—	—
1996	"Klubbhopping"	—	—	—	—	39	10
1997	"Discohopping"	12	—	—	—	41	35
1998	"Kickin' Hard"	—	35	86	—	—	36
1998	"Raise Your Hands" (with Mark van Dale)	—	—	—	—	—	—
1999	"Release the Pressure"	—	—	—	—	—	—
2000	"Turn Up the Bass"	—	—	88	41	—	—
2000	"Big Bass Bomb"	—	—	—	50	—	—
2001	"Hiphopping"	—	—	—	10	—	—
2001	"Work This Cock"	—	—	—	—	—	—
2001	"Kickin' Hard (2001 Remixes)"	—	—	—	—	—	—
2001	"Here We Go"	—	—	—	19	—	171
2002	"Let the Party Begin"	—	—	—	31	—	—
2003	"Somebody Skreem!"	—	—	—	49	—	—
2003	"Bounce to the Beat"	—	—	—	—	—	—
2004	"Dutch Klubb Dubbs"	—	—	—	—	—	—
2004	"Klubbslang"	—	—	—	57	—	—
2005	"Turn Up the Bass (2005 Remixes)"	—	—	—	—	—	—
2005	"Dutch Klubb Sessions #1"	—	—	—	—	—	—
2007	"Deep Inside"	—	—	—	62	—	—

=== Drunkenmunky ===
Year	Single	Peak chart positions			
Year	Single	AUT	DEN	NED	UK
2002	"E"	8	—	16	41
2003	"The Grabbing Hands"	—	—	—	—
2003	"The Bootleg"	—	—	—	—
2004	"Yeah!"	—	—	46	—
2004	"Calabria"	—	4	38	—
2005	"Geht's Noch"	—	—	—	—
2007	"Calabria 2007"	—	—	61	—

=== Hi_Tack ===
Year	Single	Peak chart positions											
Year	Single	AUS	AUT	BEL	DEN	FIN	FRA	GER	IRE	NED	SWE	SWI	UK
2005	"Say Say Say (Waiting 4 U)"	50	65	21	18	3	35	39	8	15	42	59	4
2006	"Can You Hear Me"	—	—	—	—	15	—	—	—	—	—	—	—
2007	"Let's Dance"	—	—	—	—	—	—	—	—	24	—	—	38
2008	"Silence"	—	—	—	—	—	—	—	—	24	—	—	—
2008	"I Don't Mind"	—	—	—	—	—	—	—	—	65	—	—	—
2009	"It's Gonna Be Alright"	—	—	—	—	—	—	—	—	—	—	—	—

=== 3 Dubbs in a Sleeve ===
- 1996 "Volume 1"
- 1997 "Volume 2"
- 2000 "Klubbin' And Dubbin' EP"
- 2000 "Full Dubb Boogie EP"

=== Bamboo Sessions ===
- 2003 "Bamboo Sessions #1"
- 2004 "Bamboo Sessions #2"
- 2004 "Bamboo Sessions #3"
- 2004 "Bamboo Sessions #4"
- 2005 "Bamboo Sessions #5"

=== B.I.G. ===
- 1997 "The DJ Files 1 EP"
- 1999 "The DJ Files 2"
- 2002 "Peak Hour Insanity"
- 2004 "Break Dance Electric Boogie"

=== Cab'n'Crew ===
- 1998 "Disarm Slidebars EP"
- 1998 "The Flying Dutchman EP"
- 1999 "Domestic Turbulence EP"
- 1999 "Pure (Aviation)/Cab 'N' Pressure"
- 2000 "Cityhopping"

=== Code Blue ===
- 1996 "Bonkers EP"
- 1997 "More Bonkers EP"
- 1998 "Bonkers in Hamburg EP"

=== Da Klubb Kings ===
- 1997 "It's Time 2 Get Funky"
- 1998 "Don't Stop"
- 1999 "Everybody Pump It"
- 2001 "La Di Da Di"
- 2001 "Let's Go"
- 2002 "Two Thumbs Up!"
- 2004 "Neh Neh Oh Neh Neh"
- 2005 "Welcum to the Good Ol'Days EP"

=== Da Techno Bohemian ===
- 1996 "Bangin' Bass"
- 1997 "Pump The Bass"
- 1998 "Bangin' Bass '98"
- 2002 "Bangin' Wit A Gang of Instrumentals"
- 2002 "Droppin' The Instrumentals"
- 2002 "Pump The Bass 2002"

=== DJ BoozyWoozy ===
Year	Single	Peak chart positions			
Year	Single	AUT	BEL	GER	NED
2000	"Pizzi's Revenge"	—	—	—	—
2000	"R U Ready?/328 Ways To Do Angelina"	—	—	—	—
2001	"The Slim Boozy EP"	—	—	—	—
2001	"Party Affair"	47	11	55	4
2002	"Jumpin' Around" (feat. Pryme)	—	24	—	19
2002	"Booze It Up"	—	—	—	—
2002	"One More Try"	—	38	—	11
2003	"I Wanna Fly" (feat. Joyz)	—	—	—	47
2003	"Raise Ya Hands Up (Oh Oh)"	—	37	—	46
2004	"Life Is Music"	—	—	—	50
2004	"The Dancefloor"	—	49	—	59
2005	"Promised Land"	—	—	—	—

=== DJ Disco ===
- 1997 "Da Techno Bohemian Presents Dirty Disco Dubs"
- 1998 "Stamp Your Feet"
- 1999 "Let's Dance"
- 1999 "Dirty Disco Dubs 2"
- 1999 "Reach 2 The Top/Superfreak"
- 2003 "Get Up"
- 2005 "Stamp Your Feet (2005 Remixes)"

=== Greenfield ===
- 1995 "No Silence"
- 1998 "The Wicked Club Sandwich EP"
- 1998 "Violet Club Sandwich"
- 1999 "Forever"
- 2001 "Took Away My Love/The Moment"
- 2004 "Les Sons D'Amour"
- 2006 "Test"

=== Itty Bitty Boozy Woozy/IttyBitty, BoozyWoozy & Greatski ===
- 1995 "Tempo Fiesta (Party Time)" (UK chart #34, November 1995)
- 1997 "Luv Song"
- 1997 "Pumped Up Funk"

=== J.A.K. ===
- 1999 "I'm Gonna Dis You"
- 2000 "Everybody in Da Place!"
- 2001 "The Rap"

=== Rollercoaster ===
- 1997 "Keep It Goin'"
- 1998 "Keep The Frequency Clear"
- 1999 "Come With Me"
- 2001 "Don't Hold Me Back"
- 2004 "Damn"

=== Trancemission ===
- 1990 "No More Mindgames"
- 1991 "Trancemission (Rock Da House)"
- 1992 "The Pollution EP"
- 1993 "Inner Joy"

=== The Ultimate Seduction ===
- 1992 "The Ultimate Seduction"
- 1992 "House Nation"
- 1993 "Ba Da Da Na Na Na"
- 1994 "Together Forever (You & Me)"
- 1996 "The Ultimate Seduction/Organ Seduction '96)"
- 1997 "A Waking Nightmare"
- 1999 "Get Down And Party"
- 2001 "The Ultimate Seduction 2001"
- 2001 "It's Time To Jam"
- 2004 "The Ultimate Seduction 2004"

=== Other aliases ===
- 1991 "Metamorphism", as KA-22
- 1991 "Vol. 1", as The Sound of Now
- 1992 "Jump A Little Hi-er", as 2 Hi
- 1993 "I Need You Lovin' (Like The Sunshine)", as Infectious
- 1993 "Carnival of Sounds", as KA-22
- 1993 "Helemaal Cut", as Cut The Cake
- 1993 "Boom! Bang!", as Frantic Explosion
- 1993 "Pikke Poeli Mellow", as Hardliners
- 1994 "Volume 1", as Mellow Tracks
- 1994 "Volume 2", as Mellow Tracks
- 1995 "Going Crazy", as Rave Nation (with René van den Berghe)
- 1995 "The Summer of Love", as Catalana
- 1995 "Tossing And Turning", as Chakka Boom Bang
- 1995 "Dr. Beat", as D-Natural
- 1995 "I Need You Lovin' (Happy Hardcore And Jungle Mixes)", as Infectious
- 1996 "Let The Rhythm Set You Free", as Greatski
- 1996 "Feel My Heartbeat", as Joy
- 1996 "The Horn", as Digidance
- 1996 "Guardian Angel", as Chiara (with Dian Senders)
- 1996 "Everybody on the Floor", as Seven-Tees
- 1997 "Take Me There", as Maximum
- 1997 "Nowhere To Run", as Chiara (with Dian Senders)
- 1997 "Club Fiction EP", as Reservoir Jocks
- 1997 "Joyride", as Joy
- 1997 "Get Up Stand Up", as Queer
- 1997 "Do You Wanna Funk", as Slammer
- 1998 "Summer Fairytales", as MF-Tracks
- 1998 "Just Buggin' EP", as Millennium Bug
- 1999 "Disco Crash EP", as Bad Boy Notorious
- 1999 "Check This Out!", as Capo Copa
- 1999 "Showtime", as Greatski
- 2000 "C'mon Baby", as Clubsquad
- 2000 "The Russian Roulette", as The Tone Selector
- 2000 "So Good", as Itty Bitty vs. Stabak (with DJ Stabak)
- 2001 "Heartbeat", as The Tone Selector
- 2001 "Welcome To Ibiza", as Al Cappucino
- 2001 "Dee-Jay", as The DJ
- 2001 "Sunrise", as Itty Bitty vs. Stabak (with DJ Stabak)
- 2001 "I Believe in Love", as Cooper
- 2002 "Hungry For Your Love", as Beat Culture
- 2002 "I Will Follow You", as Shelley (with Nico Verrips)
- 2002 "Right Here Waiting", as Lorindo
- 2003 "Do You Wanna Funk (Remixes)", as Slammer
- 2003 "I Want You Back", as Cooper
- 2005 "Can.You_Feel:It", as LCD-J
- 2005 "B.A.M.", as Tek Team
- 2005 "Move Your Feet", as Klubbdriver (with Pulsedriver)
- 2006 "Mama Say Mama Sa", as The Caramel Club
- 2006 "Direct Dizko", as Club Scene Investigators
- 2006 "That Once in a Lifetime", as Untouchable 3
- 2006 "Quadrophonia", as Klubbdriver (with Pulsedriver)
- 2007 "F***ing Society", as Club Scene Investigators
- 2007 "Break My Stride", as Dutch Maffia

=== (Co-)Production for other artists ===
- 1995 Paul Elstak – "Don't Leave Me Alone"
- 1995 Paul Elstak – "Love U More"
- 1996 Paul Elstak – "Rainbow in the Sky"
- 1996 Paul Elstak – "Rave On"
- 1996 Paul Elstak – "The Promised Land"
- 1996 Paul Elstak – "Get This Place"
- 1996 Nance – "Big Brother Is Watching You"
- 1996 Nance – "Kiss It"
- 1998 DJ Jean – "U Got My Love"
- 1999 DJ Jean – "The Launch" (with Natasja Morales)
- 2000 DJ Jean – "Love Come Home" (with Johnny Kelvin)
- 2001 Kick 'n' Rush – "Party Time"
- 2001 DJ Jean – "Lift Me Up"
- 2002 Hula Girl – "Hula All Over The World"
- 2002 Mad'House – "Holiday" (with Nico Verrips)
- 2003 Mad'House – "Into The Groove" (with Nico Verrips)
- 2003 Buse – "Love 2 Nite"
- 2003 Touriya – "In The Name of Love" (with Nico Verrips)

=== Albums ===
- 1997 The First... The Best... The Hottest Disco Album in the World... Ever!, as DJ Disco
- 1998 Kick You Hard
- 2000 Discofreaks, as DJ Disco
- 2001 Front to the Back
