= Calabria (song) =

2003 song by Rune Reilly Kölsch

Single by Rune
- Released: 2003
- Genre: House
- Length: 8:11 (original mix); 3:35 (radio edit)
- Label: Credence; Feel the Rhythm (France)
- Songwriter: Rune Reilly Kolsch
- Producer: Rune Reilly Kolsch

Rune singles chronology
"Calabria" (2003)	"Nothing New" (2003)

"Calabria" is a song by Danish DJ/producer Rune Reilly Kölsch. It was originally released in 2003 by Credence, a sublabel of Parlophone Records.

The song has been remixed or released in numerous other versions by different artists, the most successful being "Calabria 2007" by Enur with vocals by Natasja Saad. Others include records by Drunkenmunky, Dirty Laundry and Kaner in 2004, by Alex Gaudino featuring vocals from Crystal Waters on "Destination Calabria" in 2006, by Criminal Vibes in 2013 and by Firebeatz and Jaques Le Noir in 2014. In 2007, Pitbull and Lil Jon sampled "Calabria 2007" in "The Anthem".

In 2014, British musician Guppy Slim played a set dedicated to "Calabria" at Casa Del Vibe in Bristol. It was recorded and played on BBC Radio 6 Music at various times following its performance.

== Background ==
The song was originally produced in 2001. Rune's intention was to create "a balearic version of Jeff Mills' The Bells" -

I was trying to make something that would endure the loop that you wouldn't get tired to listen to - which The Bells is a perfect example of

Initial response from Rune's manager company was not positive - this is absolute trash, it's never gonna be anything, it's just annoying to listen to - and the song was not picked up by any label until two years later although the public was really into it

== Track listing ==
2003 12" vinyl

1. "Calabria" (Original Mix) – 7:45
2. "Calabria" (Artificial Funk Remix) – 9:14
3. "Calabria" (DJ Tool) – 2:05

== Charts ==
Chart (2004)	Peak position
Greece (IFPI)	30
Netherlands (Single Top 100)	48

== Drunkenmunky version ==
"Calabria"

Single by Drunkenmunky
- B-side: "Das Bass"
- Released: 2004
- Genre: Eurodance
- Length: 5:41 (euro mix); 2:45 (radio mix)
- Label: D'n'A
- Songwriter: Rune Reilly Kolsch
- Producer: Klubbheads

Drunkenmunky singles chronology
"Yeah!" (2003)	"Calabria" (2004)	"Geht's Noch" (2004)

Dutch group Drunkenmunky produced and released their version of "Calabria" in 2004. A remix in 2007 titled "Calabria (2007 Jump Mix)" was released which also charted.

=== Charts ===
"Calabria"
Chart (2004)	Peak position
Denmark (Tracklisten)	4
Netherlands (Single Top 100)	38

"Calabria (2007 Jump Mix)"
Chart (2007)	Peak position
Netherlands (Single Top 100)	61

== Dirty Laundry version ==
Chart (2004)	Peak position
Netherlands (Single Top 100)	80

== "Calabria 2007" (Enur remix) ==
"Calabria 2007"

Single by Enur featuring Natasja

from the album Raggatronic
- Released: 13 March 2007
- Genre: House; reggae fusion; ragga
- Length: 6:31 (club mix); 3:51 (radio mix); 3:58 (video version)
- Label: Ministry of Sound; Ultra (US)
- Songwriter: Rune Reilly Kolsch
- Producer: Johannes Torpe

Enur singles chronology
"You Got Me EP" (2005)	"Calabria 2007" (2007)	"Yesteryear" / "Run In" (2007)

In 2007, a remix with additional dancehall beats and vocals by Danish reggae singer Natasja Saad was released, titled "Calabria 2007", by Rune and Johannes Torpe under the name Enur. This reggae fusion version has been very successful around the world and gained popularity in the United States in mid-to-late 2007. It received heavy club play, eventually entering the playlist of major Top-40/Dance radio stations such as Z100 and KTU. It placed at #80 on Z100's top 100 songs of 2007. This version was featured in a Target advertisement for the 2007–2008 school year, featuring college dorm supplies, and due to the song's prominence in the ad, the song received much exposure.

In 2008, the song hit the U.S. Billboard Hot 100 at number 46, making it one of the highest peaking reggae fusion songs in 2008. There is also another remix featuring Mims and a Dominican rap remix featuring Dominican artist Punto Rojo. On 16 January 2008 the song reached number one on Billboard's Hot Dance Airplay chart.

Calabria 2007 is one of the last songs recorded by Natasja to be released before her untimely passing after a car accident in Kingston, Jamaica in June 2007. A reworked version of the song titled "Calabria 2008" would be released posthumously on her 2008 English language album "Shooting Star".

On June 18, 2024 it was announced that the song would be featured on the upcoming Just Dance 2025 Edition, released on October 15, 2024.

=== Track listing ===
CD single

1. "Calabria 2007" (Radio Edit) – 3:52
2. "Calabria 2007" (Club Mix) – 6:31
3. "Calabria 2007" (Instrumental Mix) – 6:31

=== Charts ===
==== Weekly charts ====
Chart (2007–2008)	Peak position
Belgium (Ultratip Bubbling Under Wallonia)	4
Canada Hot 100 (Billboard)	21
France (SNEP)	9
Hungary (Dance Top 40)	16
Hungary (Editors' Choice Top 40)	33
US Billboard Hot 100	46
US Dance Club Songs (Billboard)	1
US Dance Airplay (Billboard)	1
US Pop Airplay (Billboard)	28

==== Year-end charts ====
Chart (2007)	Position
France (SNEP)	54
Chart (2008)	Position
Canada (Canadian Hot 100)	71
US Dance/Mix Show Airplay (Billboard)	21

=== Certifications ===
Region	Certification	Certified units/sales
Denmark (IFPI Danmark)	Gold	45,000^{‡}
Denmark (IFPI Danmark) Calabria 2008	Gold	45,000^{‡}
United States (RIAA)	Gold	500,000^{*}
Ringtone
Canada (Music Canada)	Gold	20,000^{*}
^{*} Sales figures based on certification alone.^{‡} Sales+streaming figures based on certification alone.

== "Calabria (Firebeatz Remix)" ==
"Calabria (Firebeatz Remix)"

Single by Rune RK
- Released: 13 October 2014
- Genre: House; big room
- Length: 3:41
- Label: Musical Freedom; Scorpio
- Songwriter: Rune Reilly Kolsch
- Producers: Rune Reilly Kolsch; Firebeatz (remix)

In 2014, a remix by Dutch DJ duo Firebeatz was released on 13 October, along with a supporting music video.

=== Charts ===
Chart (2014)	Peak position
Belgium (Ultratip Bubbling Under Flanders)	81
Belgium (Ultratip Bubbling Under Wallonia)	32
France (SNEP)	63
Sweden Heatseeker (Sverigetopplistan)	1

== DMNDS and Fallen Roses version ==
In 2021, DMNDS and Fallen Roses released their version of "Calabria 2007" on Stef van Vugt's Dance Fruits label, a sub-label of his Strange Fruits/Fruits Music record company. Featuring Lujavo & Lunis and Nito-Onna, the song charted in several countries across Europe, and was most successful in Finland.

=== Track listing ===
Digital download

1. "Calabria" – 2:08

=== Charts ===
==== Weekly charts ====
Chart (2021)	Peak position
Belgium (Ultratop 50 Wallonia)	40
Finland (Suomen virallinen lista)	12
France (SNEP)	27
Germany (GfK)	95
Netherlands (Single Tip)	8
Sweden (Sverigetopplistan)	64
Switzerland (Schweizer Hitparade)	79

==== Year-end charts ====
Chart (2021)	Position
France (SNEP)	123

=== Certifications ===
Region	Certification	Certified units/sales
Austria (IFPI Austria)	Gold	15,000^{‡}
Denmark (IFPI Danmark)	Gold	45,000^{‡}
France (SNEP)	Platinum	200,000^{‡}
Norway (IFPI Norway)	Gold	30,000^{‡}
Poland (ZPAV)	Platinum	50,000^{‡}
Streaming
Sweden (GLF)	Gold	4,000,000^{†}
^{‡} Sales+streaming figures based on certification alone.^{†} Streaming-only figures based on certification alone.

== Samples and covers ==
In June 2022, two songs that sample "Calabria" were climbing the UK top 30 at the same time. The higher charting track of the two, as of 17 June 2022, was "21 Reasons" by DJ Nathan Dawe and singer Ella Henderson at number 9, while eight places below was West London drill rapper Benzz with "Je M'appelle". Both songs sample the riff from "Calabria", while "Je M'appelle" also samples vocals from "Calabria 2007".

In 2026, rappers Coi Leray and Eladio Carrión sampled the riff for their track "Outside".
