= The Launch (song) =

1999 single by DJ Jean

- United Kingdom cover art

Single by DJ Jean
- Released: April 1999
- Genre: Dance
- Length: 6:46 (original); 3:38 (radio edit)
- Label: Mo'Bizz
- Songwriters: Koen Groeneveld; Addy van der Zwan; Jan Voermans; Jan Engelaar
- Producers: Klubbheads; DJ Jean

DJ Jean singles chronology
"U Got My Love" (1998)	"The Launch" (1999)	"Love Come Home" (2000)

Audio sample
- The Launch (1999): file; help

"The Launch" is a song by Dutch disc jockey DJ Jean, produced by Jean and Klubbheads. The vocals are performed by Natasja Morales. It was released in the Netherlands in April 1999 and reached number one on the Dutch Top 40. In the United Kingdom, the song was released in August 1999, peaking at number two on the UK Singles Chart the following month.

== Impact and legacy ==
British electronic dance and clubbing magazine Mixmag included "The Launch" in their list of "The Biggest Drops in Dance Music" in 2020, writing, "Get ready for the launch advises a vocal near the start of this track. The sage words follow a sample of NASA comms, which come back around as a space shuttle countdown (5.. 4.. 3.. 2.. 1..) as the track builds towards its momentous drop. It's extremely cheesy, and extremely fun. When those bouncing trance notes rush in, dancefloors always hit the stratosphere."

== Track listing ==
- Dutch CD single
1. "The Launch" (radio edit) – 3:38
2. "The Launch" (Rollercoaster's Pumped Up Mix) – 6:10

== Charts ==
=== Weekly charts ===
Chart (1999–2000)	Peak position
Australia (ARIA)	74
Belgium (Ultratop 50 Flanders)	14
Canada Dance/Urban (RPM)	4
Europe (Eurochart Hot 100)	11
France (SNEP)	28
Germany (GfK)	92
Iceland (Íslenski Listinn Topp 40)	30
Ireland (IRMA)	2
Netherlands (Dutch Top 40)	1
Netherlands (Single Top 100)	2
Scottish Singles Sales (Official Charts)	2
Sweden (Sverigetopplistan)	40
UK Singles (Official Charts)	2
UK Dance (Official Charts)	1
US Maxi-Singles Sales (Billboard) with "You Got My Love"	12

=== Year-end charts ===
Chart (1999)	Position
Belgium (Ultratop 50 Flanders)	100
Europe (Eurochart Hot 100)	93
Netherlands (Dutch Top 40)	27
Netherlands (Single Top 100)	12
UK Singles (OCC)	43

Chart (2000)	Position
US Maxi-Singles Sales (Billboard)	44

== Certifications ==
Region	Certification	Certified units/sales
United Kingdom (BPI)	Gold	400,000^{‡}
^{‡} Sales+streaming figures based on certification alone.

== Release history ==
Region	Date	Format(s)	Label(s)	Ref.
Netherlands	April 1999	CD	Mo'Bizz	
United Kingdom	30 August 1999	12-inch vinyl; CD; cassette	AM:PM	
