= Sacha Marie Taylor =

Scottish singer and songwriter

Sacha Marie Taylor (born 6 March 1995), known mononymously as SACHA, is a Scottish singer and songwriter. She is best known for her vocal features and songwriting collaborations with electronic dance music producers, including Armin van Buuren, Alesso, Joel Corry, and Steve Aoki.

== Early life ==
Taylor was born in Perth, Scotland. Prior to pursuing a full-time career in electronic music, she worked as a hairdresser while writing music independently, before relocating to London.

== Career ==
Taylor began her music career writing pop and acoustic music before transitioning into electronic dance music. In 2024, she co-wrote and featured on the single "HIGHER" with UK producers Joel Corry and Nathan Dawe.

She subsequently collaborated with Dutch producer Armin van Buuren on the single "Set Me Free", which reached number one on the Billboard Dance/Mix Show Airplay chart. Following the success of "Set Me Free", Taylor joined van Buuren as a performing vocalist on tour and recorded a follow-up collaboration, "Everlasting". In interviews, Taylor noted that she writes and records core vocal tracks independently before pitching the stems to producers who build the electronic track around her melodies. Her other vocal feature credits include "Destiny" with Alesso and "Gravity" with Steve Aoki.

== Discography ==
=== Selected singles ===
- "HIGHER" (with Joel Corry and Nathan Dawe, 2024)
- "Set Me Free" (with Armin van Buuren, 2025)
- "Destiny" (with Alesso, 2025)
- "Gravity" (with Steve Aoki and Ely Oaks, 2025)
- "Everlasting" (with Armin van Buuren, 2026)
