= Gary Haney =

American architect

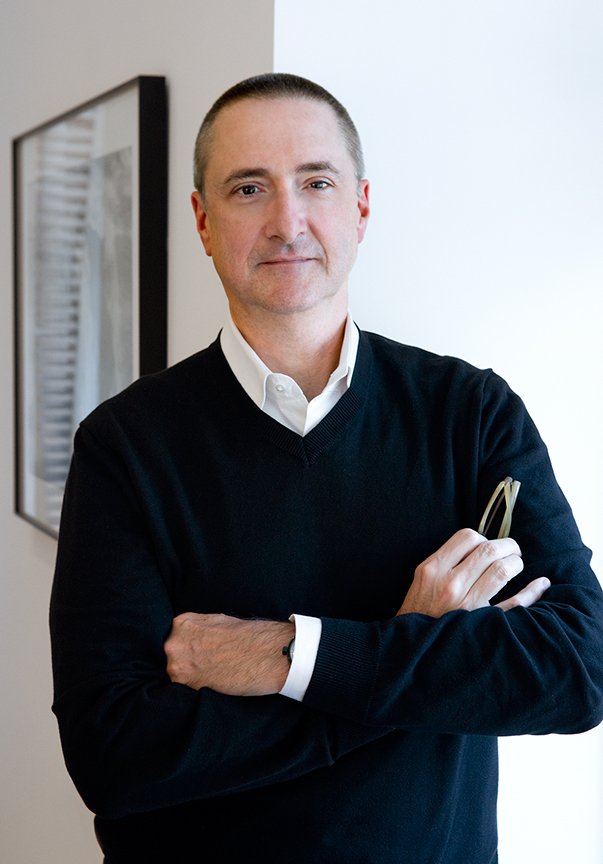
- Born: Gary Paul Haney; April 16, 1955 (age 71); Middletown, Ohio, U.S.
- Education: Harvard Graduate School of Design, (M.Arch.); Miami University, (B.Envd.)
- Occupation: Architect
- Practice: Skidmore, Owings & Merrill
- Buildings: Al Hamra Tower, National Museum of American History renovation, Embassy of the United States, Ottawa
- Website: www.som.com/about/leadership/gary_haney

Gary Paul Haney FRIBA, FAIA (born April 16, 1955) is an American architect, a design partner in the firm of Skidmore, Owings & Merrill. Haney's approach draws heavily on environmental modeling techniques, deep materials research, and advanced building information modeling (BIM) technologies. Buildings on which he was lead designer include the supertall Al Hamra Tower in Kuwait City and civic buildings in the United States including two Public Safety Answering Centers in New York City and the United States Census Bureau headquarters and the redesign of the National Museum of American History, both in Washington, D.C.

== Early life and education ==
Born in Middletown, Ohio, Haney earned a Bachelor of Environmental Design in architecture from Miami University in Oxford, Ohio, where he studied under Richard McCommons, helping him design and construct private residences. He then became the first employee of the newly formed firm Alesia & Crewell before studying for a Master of Architecture at Harvard University Graduate School of Design, where he participated in studios with Michael McKinnell and Gerhard Kallmann and graduated in 1981.

== Career ==
Haney joined Skidmore, Owings & Merrill as a junior designer in the technical department and was certified as a registered architect in 1987. He became a design partner with the firm in 1996. The bulk of his career has been in applied design work.

== Notable buildings ==
=== Tall and supertall buildings ===
==== Al Hamra Tower ====
Al Hamra Tower in Kuwait City, completed in 2011, is an example of Haney and his team's use of building information modeling (BIM) technologies. With 77 floors and 412 meters (1,351 ft) tall, it is the tallest building in Kuwait. The building won a Merit Award from the New York chapter of the American Institute of Architects (AIA) in 2013.

Other notable tall building projects underway, completed, or design-stage submissions by Haney include the Manhattan West Development, Zhong Hong Tower, Shum Yip Upperhills, Longgang Tian’an Cyber Park, International Gem Tower, Baccarat Hotel and Residences, New York, and Al Sharq Tower.

=== Civic and government buildings ===
==== Ottawa Embassy ====
Haney was lead architect with David Childs on the United States Embassy in Ottawa, Ontario, dedicated by President Clinton in October 1999. The design had to be completely changed after the Oklahoma City bombing required a more secure building. The building's glazed facade was eliminated, and some walls are four feet thick. According to architecture critic Benjamin Forgey, Childs and Haney managed to build the structure "like a bunker, without making it look like one".

==== U.S. Census Bureau Headquarters ====
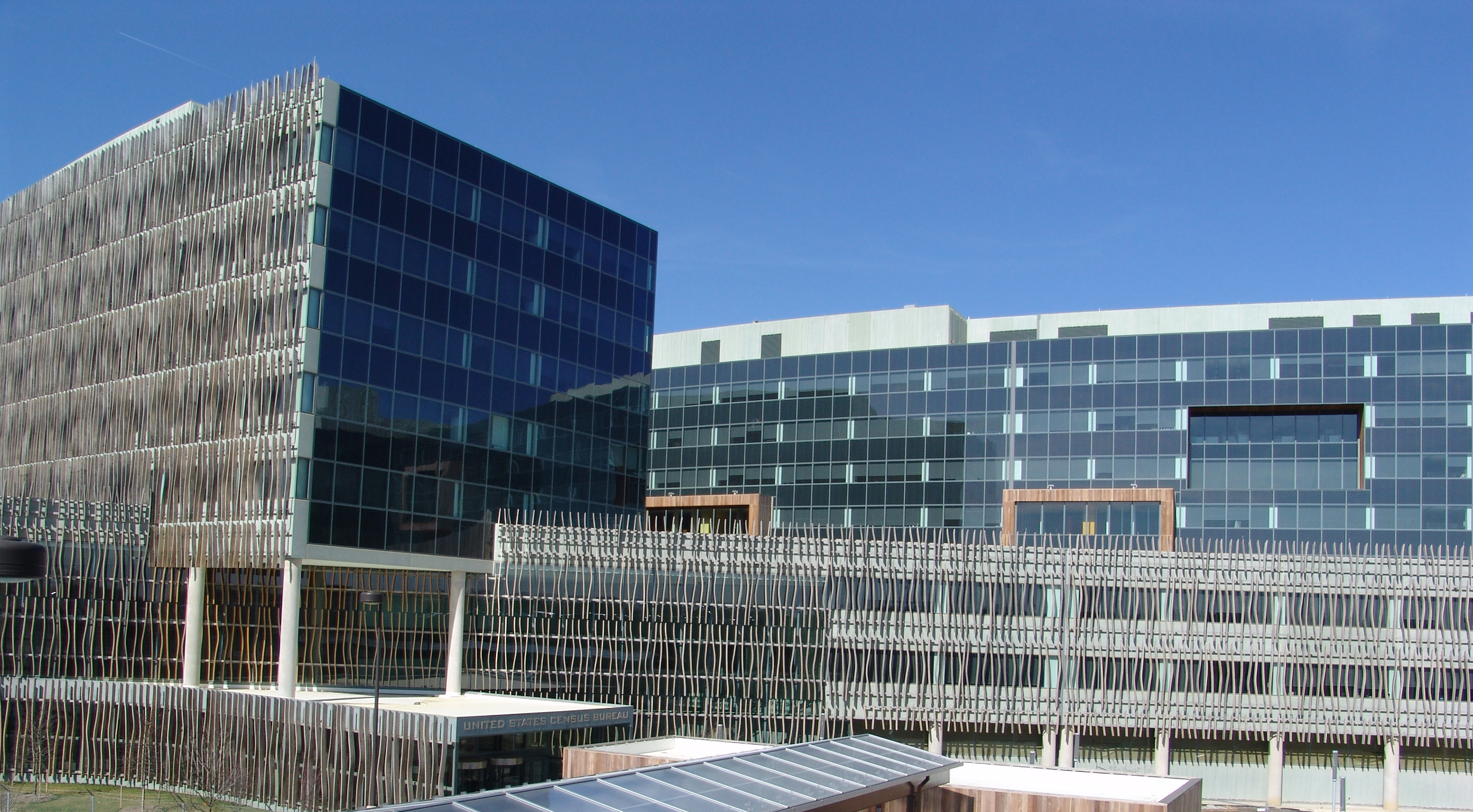
Census Bureau Headquarters, Suitland, Maryland, 2007

The new U.S. Census Bureau Headquarters in Suitland, Maryland, officially opened in 2007, was designed to accommodate a workforce that fluctuates because of the periodic nature of the census, had to be constructed around operational structures, and was limited to eight stories by site regulations. Essentially two buildings hewn from a central mass, it is 1,200 meters (3,937 feet) long. The design uses laminated wood on the facade, seeking to make those inside feel as if they are in a woodland. The building won a Green Good Design award from the Chicago Athenaeum in 2009 and an Award of Excellence in Architecture from the Washington chapter of the AIA in 2012.

==== Smithsonian National Museum of American History renovation ====
Haney led the $85 million renovation of the National Museum of American History, part of the Smithsonian Institution in Washington, D.C. The highly trafficked museum, with nearly 3 million visitors in 2005, was closed the following year for the renovation, which increased light by creating a five-story atrium and re-organized 300,000 square feet of exhibition space around the original Star-Spangled Banner. It reopened in November 2008. The renovation won an Award of Merit at the 2013 AIA Washington D.C. Design Awards.

=== Education ===
Haney also serves as an educator and lecturer. He has taught at MIT, Miami University, and Ball State University and became a faculty member in architectural practice at Northeastern University in September 2013 and is the current chair of the National Building Museum in Washington.

== Architectural designs ==
=== Tall buildings ===
- Al Hamra Tower, Kuwait City, Kuwait (2011)
- Manhattan West Development, New York, New York (2015)
- BBVA Bancomer Operations Center, Mexico City, Mexico, (2015)
- International Gem Tower (55 West 46th Street), New York, New York (2013)
- Baccarat Hotel & Residences, New York, New York, (2015)
- Qatar Petroleum Centre, Doha, Qatar (2014)
- Feidi Next C Master Plan, Tianjin, China
- ARB Headquarters, Riyadh, Kingdom of Saudi Arabia
- Central Bank of Kuwait, Kuwait (2003)
- 400 Fifth Avenue, New York, New York (not built)
- New York Mercantile Exchange, New York, New York (1997)
- 255 Fifth, Cincinnati, Ohio (1990)
- Shanghai JW Marriott Marquis Hotel, Shanghai, China (2017)
- Al Sharq Tower, Dubai, United Arab Emirates (unspecified)
- Jumeirah Messilah Beach Hotel, Kuwait (2010)
- Shum Yip Upperhills Class A Office & Luxury Hotel Complex, Shenzhen, China (2017)
- Zhong Hong Tower, Beijing, China (2016)
- Longgang Tian’an Cyber Park, Longgang, Shenzhen, China (2016)
- Shenzhen Rural Commercial Bank, Bo’an, Shenzhen, China (2016)
- Tangshan Zhaorui International Plaza, Tangshan, China (2017)

=== Government ===
- International Monetary Fund Headquarters, Washington, D.C. (2012)
- U.S. Census Bureau Headquarters, Suitland, Maryland (2007)
- U.S. Patent and Trademark Office, Alexandria, Virginia (2005)
- FBI Metropolitan Field Headquarters, Washington, D.C. (1995)
- Public Safety Answering Center II, Bronx, New York (2015)
- Public Safety Answering Center I, Brooklyn, New York (2001)
- Smithsonian National Museum of American History, Renovation & Expansion, Washington, D.C. (2009)
- U.S. Federal Courthouse, Charleston, West Virginia (1998)
- U.S. Embassy, Ottawa, Ontario, Canada (1999)
- U.S. Courthouse for the Southern District of New York, White Plains (1995)
- Port Authority Bus Station (20 Times Square), New York, New York (2003)

=== Other ===
- 1801 K Street, NW, Washington, D.C. (2009)
- 2001 K Street, Washington, D.C. (2000)
- C4ISR Headquarters Campus, Aberdeen, Maryland (unspecified)
- City Santa Fé Residences, Mexico City, Mexico (2016)
- Al Rayyan Boulevard and Residential Development, Doha, Qatar (2006)
- Georgetown Plaza and Four Seasons Hotel, Washington, D.C. (1979)
- Park Hyatt Hotel - U.S. News & World Report Complex, Washington, D.C. (1986)
- National Defense University, Lincoln Hall, Fort McNair, Washington, D.C. (2008)
- Edwards Center, University of Cincinnati, Cincinnati, Ohio (1992)
- Metro Center, Washington, D.C. (1983)
- Park Imperial and Random House Headquarters, New York, New York (2003)
- Hamilton Square/Garfinkel's Renovation, Washington, D.C. (1996)

== Publications ==
- Efficiency: An Analytical Approach to Tall Office Buildings (Northeastern University Press, 2013: editor)
