= DJ Jean =

Dutch disc jockey (born 1968)

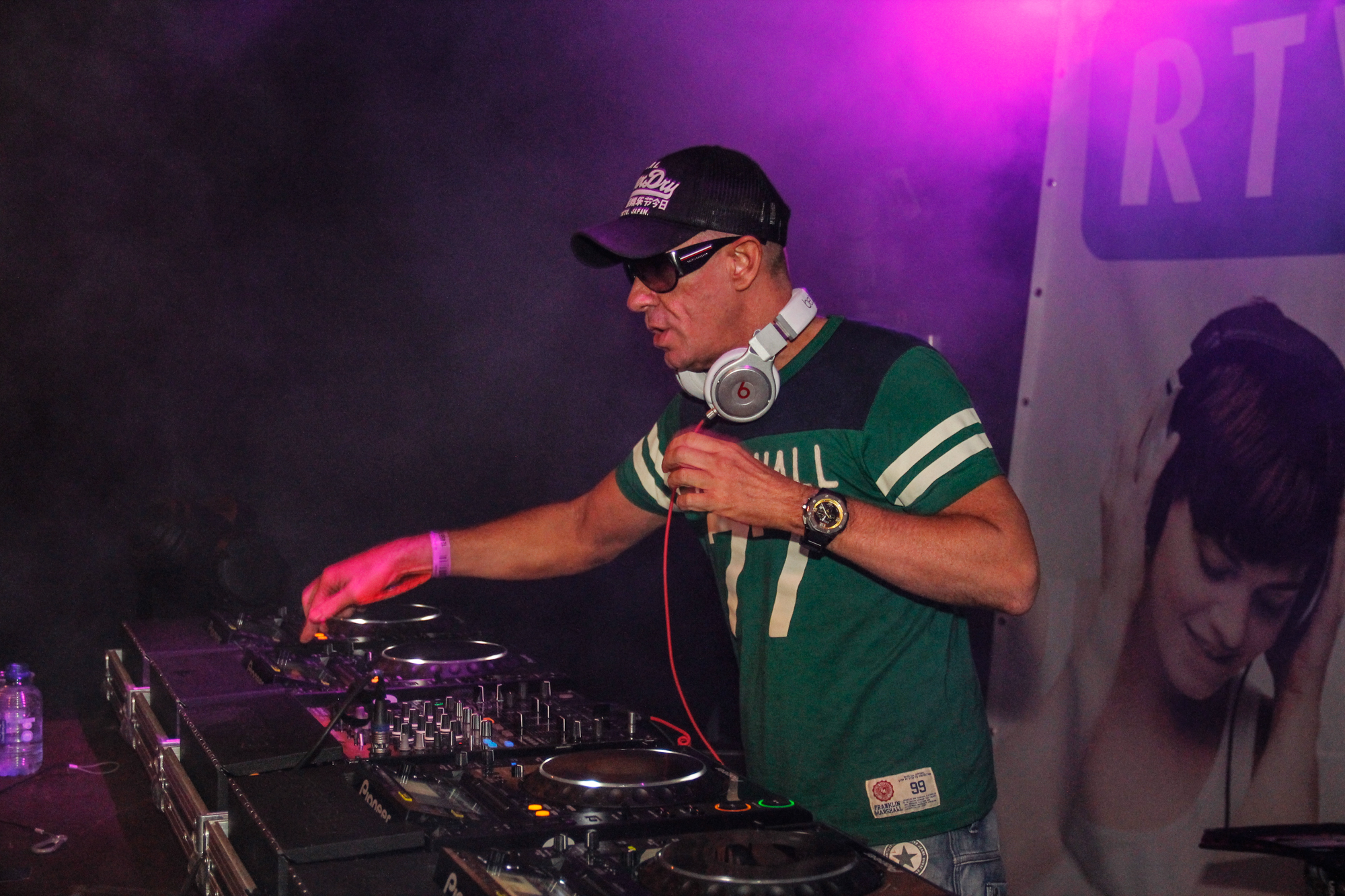
- DJ Jean (2013)

Background information
- Also known as: DJ Fresh Force (1989)
- Born: Jan Engelaar; 7 May 1968 (age 57)
- Origin: Veenendaal, Netherlands
- Genres: House, dance
- Occupation: DJ
- Years active: 1994–present
- Labels: Mo'Bizz Recordings
- Website: http://www.djjean.com

DJ Jean (born Jan Engelaar, 7 May 1968) is a Dutch disc jockey.

== Biography ==
He is most popular for his space countdown themed hard house single "The Launch". In the past DJ Jean performed all over the world, but now plays mostly in the Netherlands. During the early 90s he had a Friday night residency at the club iT in Amsterdam, before it burned down. He also hosted a radio show at Dutch radio station Slam!FM, called DJ Jean @ work.

== Discography ==
=== Singles ===
Year	Title	Peak chart positions							
Year	Title	AUS	BEL	FRA	GER	NED	SWE	SWI	UK
1997	"Let Yourself Go" (with Peran)	—	—	—	—	45	—	—	—
1998	"U Got My Love"	—	—	—	—	51	—	—	—
1999	"The Launch"	74	14	28	92	2	40	—	2
2000	"Love Come Home"	53	26	—	—	4	—	99	—
2001	"Lift Me Up"	—	53	—	—	12	—	—	—
2003	"Supersounds"	—	56	—	—	26	—	—	—
2004	"Every Single Day"	—	56	—	—	4	—	—	—
2005	"Feel It"	—	—	—	—	17	—	—	—
2007	"Sexy Lady"	—	—	—	—	17	—	—	—
2009	"Play That Beat"	—	—	—	—	6	—	—	—
2009	"Original Dutch" (vs. Quintin)	—	—	—	—	41	—	—	—
2009	"The Bomb" (vs. Asino)	—	—	—	—	74	—	—	—
2010	"New Dutch Shuffle"	—	—	—	—	80	—	—	—
"—" denotes releases that did not chart
