= MIPIM AR Future Projects Award =

Award program for unbuilt or incomplete projects

The MIPIM Architectural Review Future Projects Awards is an award program for unbuilt or incomplete projects spanning across eight categories. It is organised and awarded annually by MIPIM (Le marché international des professionnels de l’immobilier), the international property market in Cannes, France, in cooperation with the monthly international magazine Architectural Review. Since 2002, the awards have been presented at MIPIM.

== Winners ==
=== 2018 ===
OVERALL WINNER
Project: Shanghai Old Town Master Plan, Shanghai, China
Architect: Skidmore, Owings & Merrill

BIG URBAN PROJECTS
Project: The Hydroelectric Canal, Boston, Massachusetts, United States
Architect: Paul Lukez Architecture

CIVIC & COMMUNITY
Project: Skellefteå Cultural Centre, Skellefteå, Sweden
Architect: White Arkitekter

CULTURAL REGENERATION
Project: Istanbul Museum of Painting and Sculpture, Istanbul, Turkey
Architect: EAA-Emre Arolat Architecture

MIXED USE
Project: L'atelier de l'Arsenal, Paris, France
Architect: SO – IL + laisné roussel

OFFICES
Project: Cradle to Cradle S2, Düsseldorf, Germany
Architect: HPP Architekten

OLD & NEW
Project: 390 Madison Avenue, New York City, New York, United States
Architect: Kohn Pedersen Fox Associates

REGENERATION & MASTERPLANNING
Project: Shanghai Old Town Master Plan, Shanghai, China
Architect: Skidmore, Owings & Merrill

RESIDENTIAL
Project: Nibras Commercial Residential Complex, Al-Hail, Muscat, Oman
Architect: EAA-Emre Arolat Architecture

RETAIL & LEISURE
Project: Marchwiel, Tasmania, Australia
Architect: John Wardle Architects

SPORTS & STADIUMS
Project: Al Thumama Stadium, Al Thumama, Qatar
Architect: Arab Engineering Bureau

SUSTAINABILITY
Project: Parque Botánico Río Medellín, Medellín, Colombia
Architect: Latitud/Amigos de Parques del Rio

TALL BUILDINGS
Project: Commercial Bank Headquarters, Taichung, Taiwan
Architect: Aedas

=== 2017 ===
JEU D'ESPRIT PRIZE
Project: Media City, Istanbul, Turkey
Architect: Gökhan Avcıoğlu, GAD

INNOVATION
Project: Sino-Finnish Economic, Trade and Cultural Cooperation Centre, Nanjing, China
Architect: PES-Architects

CULTURAL REGENERATION
Project: Museum of Imperial Kiln, Jingdezhen City, Jiangxi Province, China
Architect: Studio Pei-Zhu

MIXED USE
Project: The Hills at Vallco, Cupertino, California, United States
Architect: Rafael Viñoly Architects

BIG URBAN PROJECTS
Project: Madinat Al Irfan, Muscat, Oman
Architect: Allies and Morrison

OFFICES
Project: 2050 M Street, Washington, D.C., United States
Architect: REX Architecture

RESIDENTIAL
Project: 118 E 59th Street Residences, New York, United States
Architect: Tabanlıoğlu Architects

TALL BUILDINGS
Project: Ceylonz Suites, Kuala Lumpur, Malaysia
Architect: Tan'ck Architect / Tan Chee Khoon

REGENERATION & MASTERPLANNING
Project: Nya Hovås Urban Plan, Gothenburg, Sweden
Architect: Utopia Arkitekter

SPORTS & STADIUMS
Project: Power Court Stadium, Luton, United Kingdom
Architect: And Architects

RETAIL & LEISURE
Project: Liepāja Thermal Bath, Liepāja, Latvia
Architect: Steven Christensen Architecture

OLD & NEW
Project: Lambeth Palace Library and Archive, London, United Kingdom
Architect: Wright & Wright Architects

CIVIC & COMMUNITY
Project: Hüsame Köklü Women's Community and Production Centre, Bayburt, Turkey
Architect: Tabanlıoğlu Architects

=== 2016 ===
OVERALL WINNER
Project: Astana railway station
Architect: Tabanlıoğlu Architects

CULTURAL REGENERATION AWARD
Project: The Three Cultural Centers and One Book Mall complex, Shenzhen, China
Architect: Mecanoo Architects

SUSTAINABILITY PRIZE
Project: Skyfarm
Architect: Rogers Stirk Harbour + Partners

RETAIL AND LEISURE PRIZE
Project: Spa Complex
Architect: GPY Arquitectos

SPORTS AND STADIUMS
Project: UFCSPA Campus Igara, Porto Alegre, Brazil
Architect: OSPA Arquitetura e Urbanismo

OLD AND NEW
Project: Bispebjerg Hospital, Denmark
Architect:CF Moller

RESIDENTIAL
Project: Liaisons, China
Architect: MOB Architects

MIXED-USE PRIZE
Project: Reinvent Paris
Architect: NBBJ

REGENERATION AND MASTERPLANNING
Project: Dune City
Architect: SAS Studio

JEU d'ESPRIT PRIZE
Project: A Rare Office, Roro, Sweden
Architect:

=== 2014 ===
OVERALL WINNER
Project: Sky Courts, Mumbai, India
Architect: Sanjay Puri Architects

BIG URBAN PROJECTS
Project: Paojiang Lake, Shaoxing, China
Architect: Paul Lukez Architecture with CRJA Landscape Architects and Green Design Union

CULTURAL REGENERATION
Project: Place Lala Yeddouna, Fez, Morocco
Architect: Mossessian & Partners with Yassir Khalil Studio

MIXED USE
Project: Vanke Jiugong, Beijing, China
Architect: Jan Closterman

OFFICES
Project: Flick Gocke Schaumburg (FGS) Campus, Düsseldorf, Germany
Architect: Eller + Eller Architekten

OLD & NEW
Project: Transforming Social Houses into Sociable Homes, S. Polo, Bresica, Italy
Architect: Luca Peralta Studio

REGENERATION & MASTERPLANNING
Project: Eiland Veur Lent, Nijmegen, Netherlands
Architect: Baca Architects

RESIDENTIAL
Project: Sky Courts, Mumbai, India
Architect: Sanjay Puri Architects

RETAIL & LEISURE
Project: Sultangazi Market Hall & Car Park, Istanbul, Turkey
Architect: Suyabatmaz Demirel Architects

SPORTS & STADIUMS
Project: Alfriston Pool, Beaconsfield, United Kingdom
Architect: Dugan Morris Architects

TALL BUILDINGS
Project: One Wood Wharf, London, United Kingdom
Architect: Herzog & de Meuron

SUSTAINABILITY AWARD
Project: Next Generation Container Port, Singapore
Architect: Osamu Morishita

=== 2011 ===
OVERALL WINNER
Project: Musheireb - Heart of Doha, Qatar
Architect: Mossessian & Partners

SUSTAINABILITY
Project: Zero Carbon Emission Building, Shanghai, China
Architect: Arup Associates

BIG URBAN PROJECTS
Project: Sino Swedish Eco-City, Wuxi, China
Architect: Tengbom Architects, Jeremy Thompson, Stellan Fryxell, Anna Kerr

MIXED USE
Project: Musheireb - Heart of Doha, Qatar
Architect: Mossessian & Partners

OFFICES
Project: Inland Steel Building Renovation, Chicago, Illinois, United States
Architect: Stephen Apking, Skidmore, Owings & Merrill

REGENERATION AND MASTERPLANNING
Project: The Earls Court Project, Earls Court, London, United Kingdom
Architect: Terry Farrell & Partners

RESIDENTIAL
Project: Skyline Paris, France
Architect: Pangalos Dugasse Feldmann Architectes

RETAIL AND LEISURE
Project: New Siena Stadium, Siena, Italy
Architect: Iotti + Pavarani Architetti, Marazzi Architetti with Arch. Giovanni Cenna

TALL BUILDINGS
Project: Cluster Complex, Dubai, United Arab Emirates
Architect: Denton Corker Marshall

=== 2009 ===
OVERALL WINNER
Project: 360° Building, São Paulo, Brazil
Architect: Isay Weinfeld Arquitetura

BIG URBAN PROJECTS
Project: Magok Waterfront, Seoul, South Korea
Architect: Samoo Architects & Engineers

MIXED USE
Project: Holbaek Harbour Masterplan and DGI-byen Sports and Leisure Complex, Holbaek Municipality, Denmark
Architect: schmidt hammer lassen

OFFICES
Project: Double Jew & Archipel, Lyon, France
Architect: Odile Decq Benoit Cornette Architects

REGENERATION AND MASTERPLANNING
Project: Valladolid Masterplan, Spain
Architect: Rogers Stirk Harbour + Partners with Vidal y Asociados Arquitectos

RESIDENTIAL
Project: 360° Building São Paulo, Brazil
Architect: Isay Weinfeld Arquitetura

RETAIL AND LEISURE
Project: Timber Stadium, Anywhere Architect: de Rijke Marsh Morgan Architects

TALL BUILDINGS
Project: Kempinski Hotel & Residences, Jeddah, Saudi Arabia
Architect: Perkins+Will

SUSTAINABILITY
Project: 100,000 Euro House, Turin, Italy
Architect: MCA Mario Cucinella Architects

Project: Arpa Offices, Ferrara, Italy
Architect: MCA Mario Cucinella Architects

=== 2008 ===
OVERALL WINNER
Project: Al Hamra Firdous Tower, Kuwait City, Kuwait Firm/Practice: Gary Haney, Skidmore, Owings & Merrill, United States

SUSTAINABILITY
Project: Alamoot Eco-Village, Iran
Firm/Practice: Somayeh Rokhgireh and Ali Pooladi, Arte Sara Co., Sustainabled (Artelio Design Inc.), Canada

REGENERATION AND MASTERPLANNING
Project: Alamoot Eco-Village, Iran
Firm/Practice: Somayeh Rokhgireh and Ali Pooladi, Sustainabled (Artelio Design Inc.), Canada

RETAIL & LEISURE
Project: Hilton Development, Wrocław, Poland
Firm/Practice: Gottesman Szmelcman Architecture with Broadway Malyan Polska, Warsaw

RESIDENTIAL
Project: Group Housing, Greater Noida, India
Firm/Practice: FXFOWLE/Sudhir Jambhekar, FXFOWLE International, United States

BIG URBAN PROJECTS
Project: Media and Cultural City, Tripoli, Libya
Firm/Practice: Astudio, United Kingdom

OFFICES
Project: Amazon Court, Prague, Czech Republic
Firm/Practice: Schmidt Hammer Lassen, Denmark

TALL BUILDINGS
Project: Al Hamra Firdous Tower, Kuwait City, Kuwait
Firm/Practice: Gary Haney, Skidmore, Owings & Merrill, United States

MIXED USE Project: St Boltoph's Cultural Quarter, Colchester, United Kingdom
Firm/Practice: Ash Sakula Architects, United Kingdom

=== 2006 ===
Overall winner
Project: Doha Gardens, Al Khobar, Saudi Arabia
Architect: Nabil Gholam Architecture

MASTERPLANNED COMMUNITIES
Project: Doha Gardens, Al Khobar, Saudi Arabia
Architect: Nabil Gholam Architecture

RETAIL & LEISURE
Project: Zlote Tarasay, Warsaw, Poland
Architect: The Jerde Partnership

RESIDENTIAL
Project: Nordhavnen-Residences, Nordhavnen, Copenhagen, Denmark
Architect: 3XN

BIG URBAN PROJECTS
Project: Fulton Street Transit Center, New York, United States
Architect: Grimshaw

OFFICES
Project: Savings Bank 'Middelfart', Algade 69, Middelfart, Denmark
Architect: 3XN

TALL BUILDINGS
Project: The Met, South Sathorn Road, Bangkok, Thailand
Architect: WOHA Architects

LOCAL REVITALISATION
Project: Revitalisation of the European Village, The New Garden Village
Architect: Arkitekturavaerkstedet/landskabsvaerkstedet

INNOVATION
Project: Bridging The Rift Research Facility, Wadi Araba, Israel /Jordan Border
Architect: Skidmore, Owings & Merrill

=== 2005 ===
BEST OF SHOW

Project: Main Station, Stuttgart

Firm/Practice: Ingenhoven und Partner Architekten

MASTERPLANNED COMMUNITIES

Winner

Project: Luchao Harbour City, near Shanghai, China

Firm/Practice: gmp – von Gerkan, Marg und Partner – Architects

Highly Commended

Project: Stratford City Masterplan, London, United Kingdom

Firm/Practice: Fletcher Priest Architects / Arup Associates / West 8

Mention

Project: The Bridges, Calgary, Alberta, Canada

Firm/Practice: Sturgess Architecture

RETAIL & LEISURE

Winner

Project: Citroen Communication Center – Champs-Élysées, Paris, France

Firm/Practice: Manuelle Gautrand

Highly Commended

Project: Jebel Ali Lighthouse Marina, Dubai, United Arab Emirates

Firm/Practice: Skidmore, Owings & Merrill LLP

Highly Commended

Project: “Paralimnio” Recreational Center, Ioannina, Greece

Firm/Practice: Lena Spania and Associates Architects

RESIDENTIAL

Winner

Project: “The city for all ages” dwellings, care centers and kindergarten, Valby, Denmark

Firm/Practice: 3XN

Highly Commended

Project: Man-cho Project, Man-cho, Izumi-City, Osaka, Japan

Firm/Practice: Satoshi Seki Architectural Avant-Garde

Highly Commended

Project: Public Housing Development, Duxton Plain, Singapore

Firm/Practice: Woha Designs PTE Ltd

BIG URBAN PROJECTS

Winner

Project: Main Station, Stuttgart

Firm/Practice: Ingenhoven und Partner Architekten

Highly Commended

Project: Freedom Park, Bangalore, India

Firm/Practice: Mathew & Ghosh Architects

Highly Commended

Project: Cranfield Mills, Ipswich, England

Firm/Practice: John Lyall Architects, United Kingdom

OFFICES

Winner

Project: ARB Bank, Riyadh, Saudi Arabia

Firm/Practice: Skidmore, Owings & Merrill LLP, United States

Highly Commended

Project: The Minerva Building

Firm/Practice: Grimshaw, United Kingdom

Highly Commended

Project: Torre Agbar, Barcelona, Spain

Firm/Practice: Layetana Desarrollos Immobiliarios, S.L., Spain

TALL BUILDINGS

Winner

Project: The Dubai Tower

Firm/Practice: Grimshaw, United Kingdom

INNOVATION AWARD FOR MATERIALS & TECHNOLOGY

Winner

Project: Man-cho Project, Man-cho, Izumi-City, Osaka, Japan

Firm/Practice: Satoshi Seki Architectural Avant-Garde

=== 2003 ===
In 2003 the category winners were:
Overall winners:
Project: Swiss Re
Architect: Foster and Partners

Project:: Sydney Harbour Moving Image Centre Architect: Francis-Jones Morehen Thorp

== See also ==
List of architecture prizes
