= Natasja Saad =

Danish rapper (1974–2007)

Background information
- Also known as: Natasja; Little T; Dou T
- Born: 31 October 1974; Copenhagen, Denmark
- Died: 24 June 2007 (aged 32) Spanish Town, Jamaica
- Genres: Reggae; dancehall; hip hop
- Occupations: Rapper; deejay; singer
- Years active: 1987–2007

Natasja Saad (31 October 1974 – 24 June 2007), also known mononymously as Natasja and also as Dou T and Little T, was a Danish rapper, deejay, and singer. While already relatively successful in her native Denmark, her vocals on a popular reggae fusion remix of "Calabria" gained her worldwide fame and a number one spot on Billboard's Hot Dance Airplay chart six months after her death in a car crash in Jamaica.

== Biography ==
Natasja Saad was born on 31 October 1974 in Copenhagen to a Danish mother, Kirstine Saad, who is a photographer, and a Sudanese father, Ahmed Saad, who was a big supporter of her career. Her father moved to Denmark to study. He learned the Danish language quickly and became a Danish citizen. Saad's parents soon divorced, and her father moved back to Sudan. She also had three half-siblings: Sarah, Nadir and Saad.

She and her siblings grew up in Islands Brygge, a district area in Copenhagen. As a child, she had a love for nature and for horses, which led her to become a professional jockey as a young adult. At age seven, she went to Sudan with her father to get in touch with her family on her father's side. At age 13, Saad first started her music career in Copenhagen, where she performed live with her long-time friend, Danish singer Karen Mukupa and McEmzee under the name No Name Requested. The band broke up in 1996.

Saad was also inspired by Jamaican culture and music. During that period, she performed along with Queen Latifah and gained popularity in Jamaica. In 1998 at age 24, while in training to become a professional jockey, she fell off her horse, slowing her career.

Saad later became the first female jockey to win a horse race in Sudan. In 2006, she won the reggae/Irie FM Big Break Contest in Jamaica, which gave her a fresh start and a big boost in her music career.

The four LP box set Legacy (1974–2007) was posthumously released 29 June 2018 on Playground Music to commemorate the 10th anniversary of Saad's death. In addition to her previously released albums Release, I Danmark Er Jeg Født and Shooting Star, Legacy (1974–2007) includes a new compilation album featuring songs from Saad's entire career.

== Death ==
Saad died on 24 June 2007 in a car crash on the outskirts of Kingston, Jamaica. Two other passengers were critically injured, but Saad's friend, Mukupa, suffered only minor injuries during the crash. She and the other injured persons were rushed to the Spanish Town Hospital where the singer was pronounced dead.

The crash was perceived as a particularly big loss for Denmark's music and entertainment world, because of how Saad's career was developing and being recognized at the time of her death.

Saad is buried at Assistens Cemetery, in Nørrebro, Copenhagen. Other graves of culturally significant figures at Assistens include Hans Christian Andersen, Søren Kierkegaard, Niels Bohr and Hans Christian Ørsted.

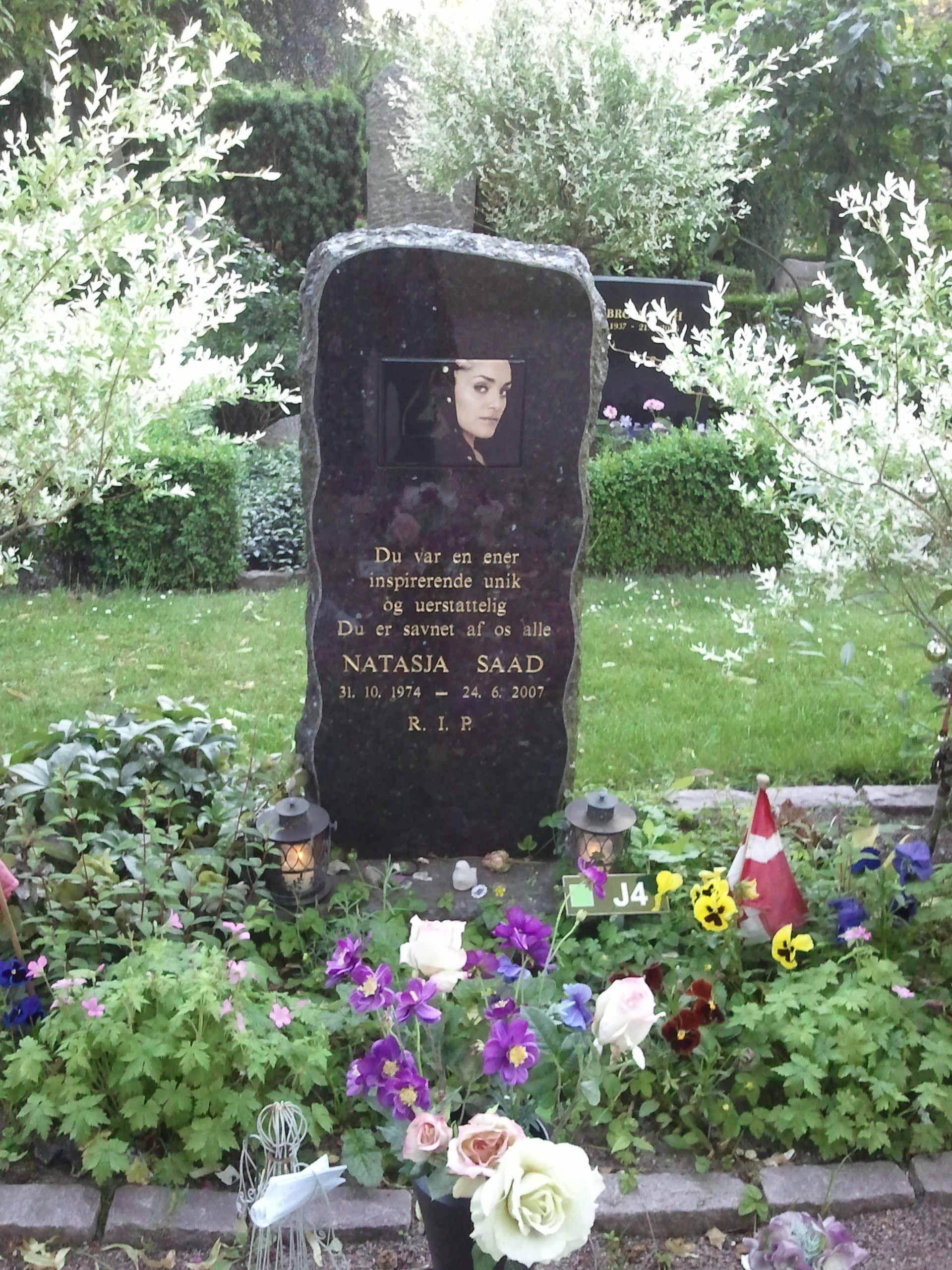
Saad's gravestone at Assistens Kirkegård in Copenhagen

The four LP box set Legacy (1974–2007) was posthumously released 29 June 2018 on Playground Music to commemorate the 10th anniversary of Saad's death. In addition to her previously released albums Release, I Danmark Er Jeg Født and Shooting Star, Legacy (1974–2007) includes a new compilation album featuring songs from Saad's entire career.

== Discography ==
=== Compilations ===
- 2018: Legacy (1974-2007) (Playground Music) (released posthumously)

=== Albums ===
- 2005: Release (Playground Music)
- 2007: I Danmark er jeg Født (Playground Music)
- 2008: Shooting Star (Playground Music) (released posthumously)
- 2013: Gi’ Os Christiania tilbage (released posthumously)
- 2018: Legacy (Playground Music) (released posthumously)

=== Singles ===
- 1992: No Name Requested: "Colors of My Mind" 12" (Mega Records)
- 1994: No Name Requested: "Come Ina De Dance" 12" (Mega Records)
- 2003: "Real Sponsor" 12" (Food Palace Music)
- 2004: "Summer Cute" 7" (Food Palace Music)
- 2004: "My Dogg /45 Questions" (Tuff Gong Distr.)
- 2005: "Op med Hovedet" ("Keep Your head up") CD single (Copenhagen Records)
- 2005: "Købmanden" ("The Grocer") (BMG)
- 2006: "Mon De Reggae"
- 2007: "Calabria 2007" (with Enur)
- 2007: "Long Time" 7" (Sly & Robbie)
- 2007: "Gi' Mig Danmark Tilbage" ("Give Me Denmark Back")
- 2008: "I Danmark er jeg født" ("In Denmark I Was Born")
- 2008: "Better Than Dem" (featuring Beenie Man)
- 2008: "Fi Er Min" ("Pu Is Mine")
- 2008: "Ildebrand I Byen" ("Fire in the City")
- 2008: "Dig og Mig" ("You and Me")
- 2013: "Money and Tings"
- 2020: "Til Banken" ("To the Bank") (Natasja X Tessa X Karen Mukupa)
- 2021: "Selvtillid" ("Self-confidence")
- 2021: "Til Banken 2007" ("To the Bank 2007") (featuring Karen Mukupa, DJ KCL, Angie)
- 2024: "African Continent" (with Bass and Trouble, featuring Karen Mukupa)
