= MIPIM =

Annual real estate event held in Cannes, France

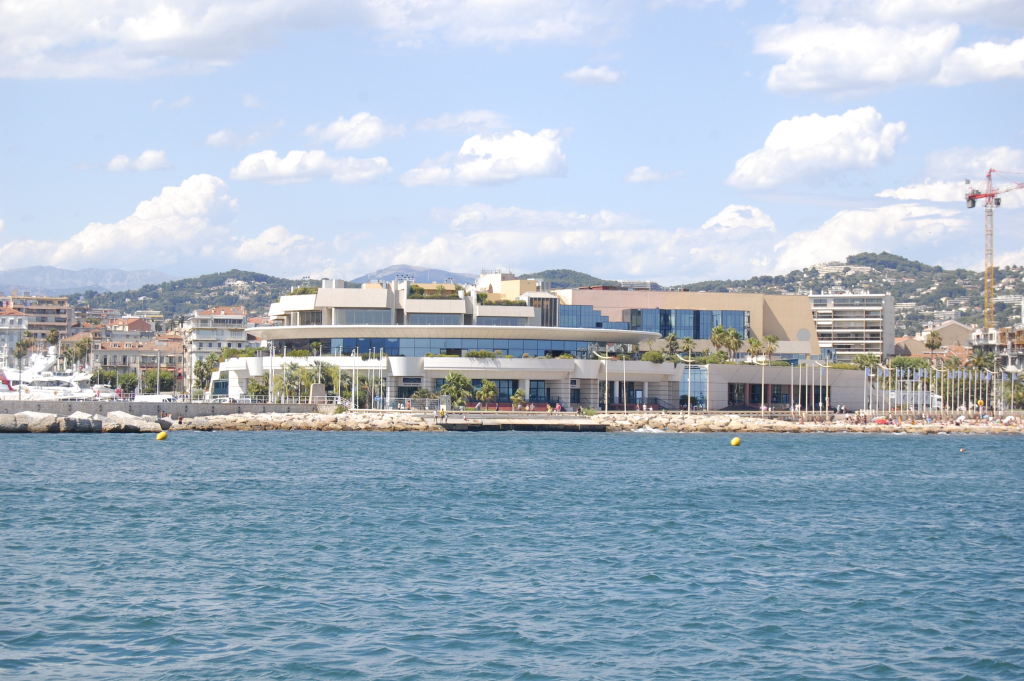
Cannes Palais des Festivals et des Congrès

MIPIM (from the French: Le Marché international des professionnels de l'immobilier) is a four-day property and real estate trade show held annually in March at the Palais des Festivals in Cannes, France. Drawing thousands of international attendees to the French Riviera, it has become a major event in the property industry, but has also been criticised for its extravagance and sleaze. A sister event, MIPIM Asia, is held annually in Hong Kong.

== History ==
Organised by Reed MIDEM, a subsidiary of Reed Exhibitions (today RELX), the event was first held in March 1990, and then attracted 2,950 attendees and 830 companies from more than 22 countries. The MIPIM Awards were instituted in 1991 and the MIPIM Architectural Review Future Projects Awards started in 2002. By 2009, MIPIM had become an established annual event where property developers, cities and local authorities could meet with potential real estate investors; in 2018, while noting the event always attracted "tycoons keen to party on lavish yachts", the Financial Times also noted the attendance of Homes England, the Department for Homes, Communities and Local Government and the British Property Federation. In 2019, a third of top-tier UK councils - 51 in total, including 11 London boroughs and eight Midlands county councils - attended MIPIM.

The event features some 20,000 square metres (220,000 sq ft) of exhibition space, a conference programme, numerous official and unofficial networking events, and an awards event featuring several categories of architectural projects. Spin-off events have also been held in other locations (for example, in London in 2014 and 2016, New York City in 2023), with MIPIM Asia in Hong Kong also an annual event.

In February 2020, MIPIM organisers postponed the event to June 2020 due to the COVID-19 pandemic, before eventually cancelling it altogether. The 2021 edition was also cancelled due to the pandemic. MIPIM resumed in 2022. According to the organisers, the 2023 event attracted over 22,500 delegates from 90 countries, including 6,500 investors from 76 of the top 100 investment managers. In 2024, 6,000 of the event's 21,000 delegates were from the UK, with London, Manchester, Liverpool, Newcastle and Belfast supporting a UK stage. In 2025, the Mayor of London Sir Sadiq Khan led a team seeking £22bn of investments in 20 key projects.

== Criticism ==
However, the cost of attending MIPIM in Cannes, and what some have regarded as excessive networking and socialising, have come in for criticism. For example, amid UK public sector spending constraints, the cost of sending local authority representatives to Cannes has been attacked by councillors in Belfast and Dudley. In 2014, The Guardian said it had a reputation as "a champagne-soaked jamboree where local authority chiefs are wined and dined by investors"; in 2019, the Local Government Chronicle said it had "a reputation for excess".

In 2018, MIPIM delegates' use of prostitutes was highlighted (also noted by a Construction News journalist in 2001: "as a naïve young reporter, I was amazed to see a list of the best brothels in town contained within the unofficial, but widely distributed, event guide"). In 2018, after the London Presidents Club scandal had revealed the "sleazy underbelly" of the property industry, MIPIM organisers issued a 'code of conduct' forbidding businessmen from bringing prostitutes to its conference and exhibitions, and several organisations including Coutts, HSBC and Bank of America Merrill Lynch withdrew their MIPIM delegations. The male-dominated and sometimes sexist culture of the event has also been criticised.
