= Rune Reilly Kölsch =

Danish electronic musician (born 1977)

Kölsch
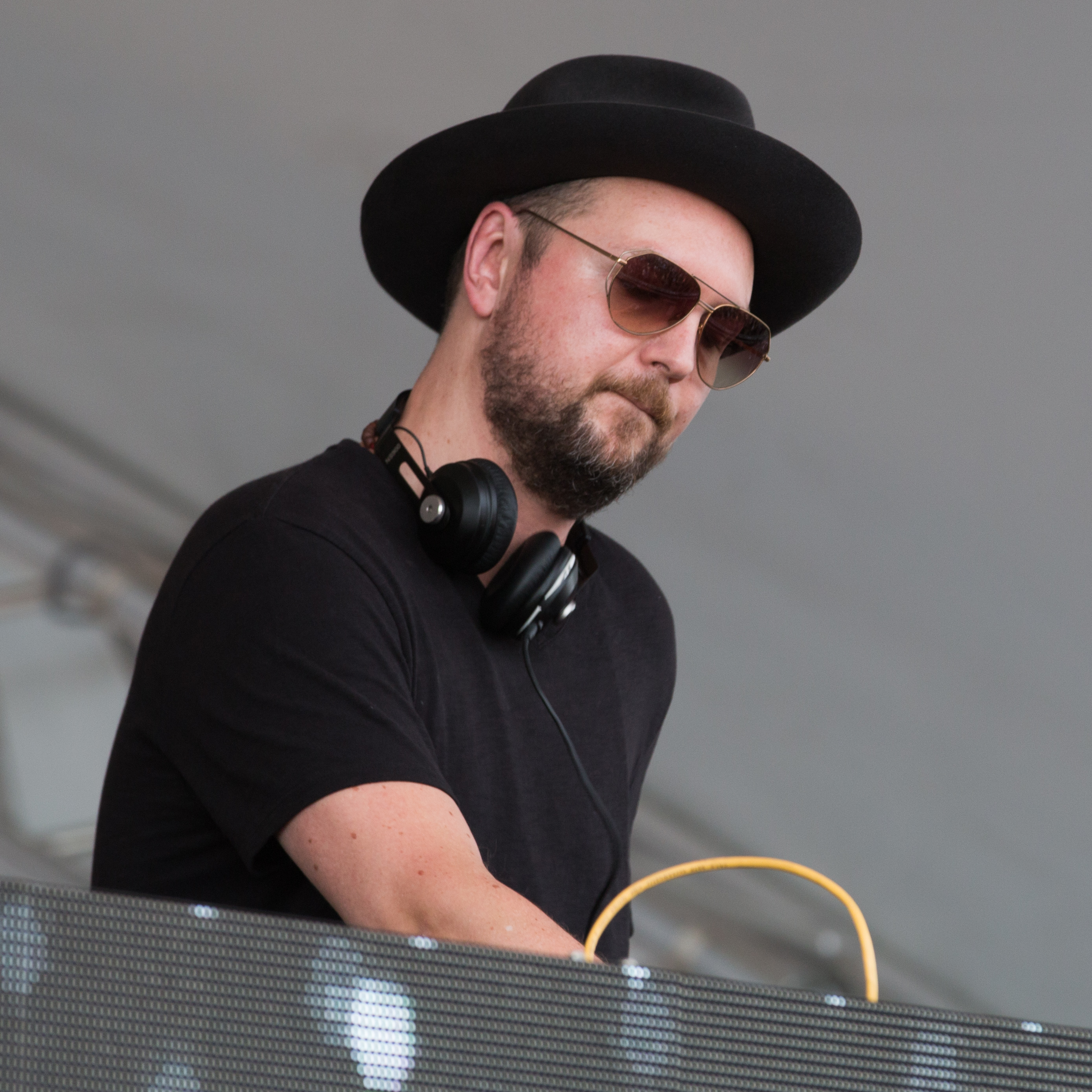
- Kölsch in 2015

Background information
- Also known as: Rune, Rune RK
- Born: Rune Reilly Kølsch; 9 February 1977 (age 49); Christiania, Denmark
- Origin: Denmark
- Genres: House, techno
- Occupations: DJ, musician
- Years active: 1995–present
- Label: Kompakt

Rune Reilly Kölsch (born 9 February 1977), simply known as Kölsch, is a Danish electronic dance musician and DJ from Copenhagen.

He has worked with artists such as Coldplay, Imogen Heap, London Grammar, Tiga, Sasha and Michael Mayer. He is best known for his 2003 instrumental track "Calabria", which has been sampled by multiple artists since its original release.

== Career ==
In 2003, Kölsch released the track "Calabria", an instrumental house tune with a synthesized saxophone riff, on Credence, a sublabel of Parlophone Records, for which he received the Danish Music Award in 2004. In the 2000s, several remakes of "Calabria" were released, including a version by Drunkenmunky and a mashup titled "Destination Calabria" by Alex Gaudino featuring Crystal Waters, a veritable international hit in many countries. In June 2022 two songs using the same sample climbed the UK Top 30, one by DJ Nathan Dawe, the other by West London drill rapper Benzz.

In 2017, Kölsch performed on top of the Eiffel Tower in Paris for Cercle.

== Discography ==
=== Studio albums ===
- 2013: 1977
- 2015: 1983
- 2017: 1989
- 2019: Fabric Presents Kölsch
- 2020: Now Here No Where
- 2021: Isopolis
- 2023: I Talk To Water

=== Singles ===
- 2010: "Loreley"
- 2010: "Silberpfeil"
- 2011: "Opa"
- 2011: "Der Alte"
- 2012: "All That Matters" (with Troels Abrahamsen)
- 2013: "Goldfisch"
- 2013: "Zig"
- 2014: "Cassiopeia"
- 2015: "Two Birds"
- 2015: "DerDieDas"
- 2016: "KIR"
- 2016: "Grey"
- 2017: "Goodbye"
- 2017: "Push"
- 2018: "Left Eye Left"
- 2018: "Emoticon"
- 2018: "Little Death"
- 2018: "Hal" (with Tiga)
- 2019: "The Lights" (with Sasha)
- 2020: "Glypto"
- 2020: "Shoulder of Giants"
- 2020: "Remind you"
- 2020: "Sleeper must awaken"
- 2020: "The Great Consumer"
- 2020: "While waiting for something to care about"
- 2020: "Time" (With Beacon)
- 2021: "Hold/Clear"
- 2021: "Louisiana" (With Dubfire)
- 2022: "ULM" (With Dubfire)
- 2022: "Prison Grass" (With Magit Cacoon)
- 2025: "Waste my time" (With CamelPhat)

=== Other projects ===
==== As Artificial Funk ====
- 1995: "Real Funk"
- 1996: "Zone One"
- 2000: "Use It (The Music)"
- 2001: "People Don't Know"
- 2002: "Together"
- 2005: "Never Alone"

==== As Ink and Needle ====
- 2006: "Number One/Number Two"
- 2006: "Number Three/Number Four"
- 2007: "Number Five/Number Six"
- 2007: "Number Seven/Number Eight"
- 2008: "Number Nine/Number Ten"
- 2008: "Number Eleven/Number Twelve"

==== As Rune RK ====
- 2012: "Teacup"
- 2013: "Burning Boombox"
- 2013: "One Perfect Day" (ft. Laura V)
- 2014: "Trash Talk"

==== As Enur ====
- 2007: "Calabria 2007"
- 2012: "I'm That Chick" (featuring Nicki Minaj & Goonrock)

==== Other aliases ====
- 2003: "Calabria", as Rune
- 2003: "I Just Want to Be a Drummer", as Heavy Rock
- 2004: "Beautiful", as Rude RKade
- 2007: "Koochi Koochi", as Fashion Victims
- 2007: "Elephant", as Rune & Sydenham (with Jerome Sydenham)
- 2008: "Peter Pan/Snow Bored", as Rune & Sydenham (Jerome Sydenham)
