= List of songs recorded by Ella Henderson =

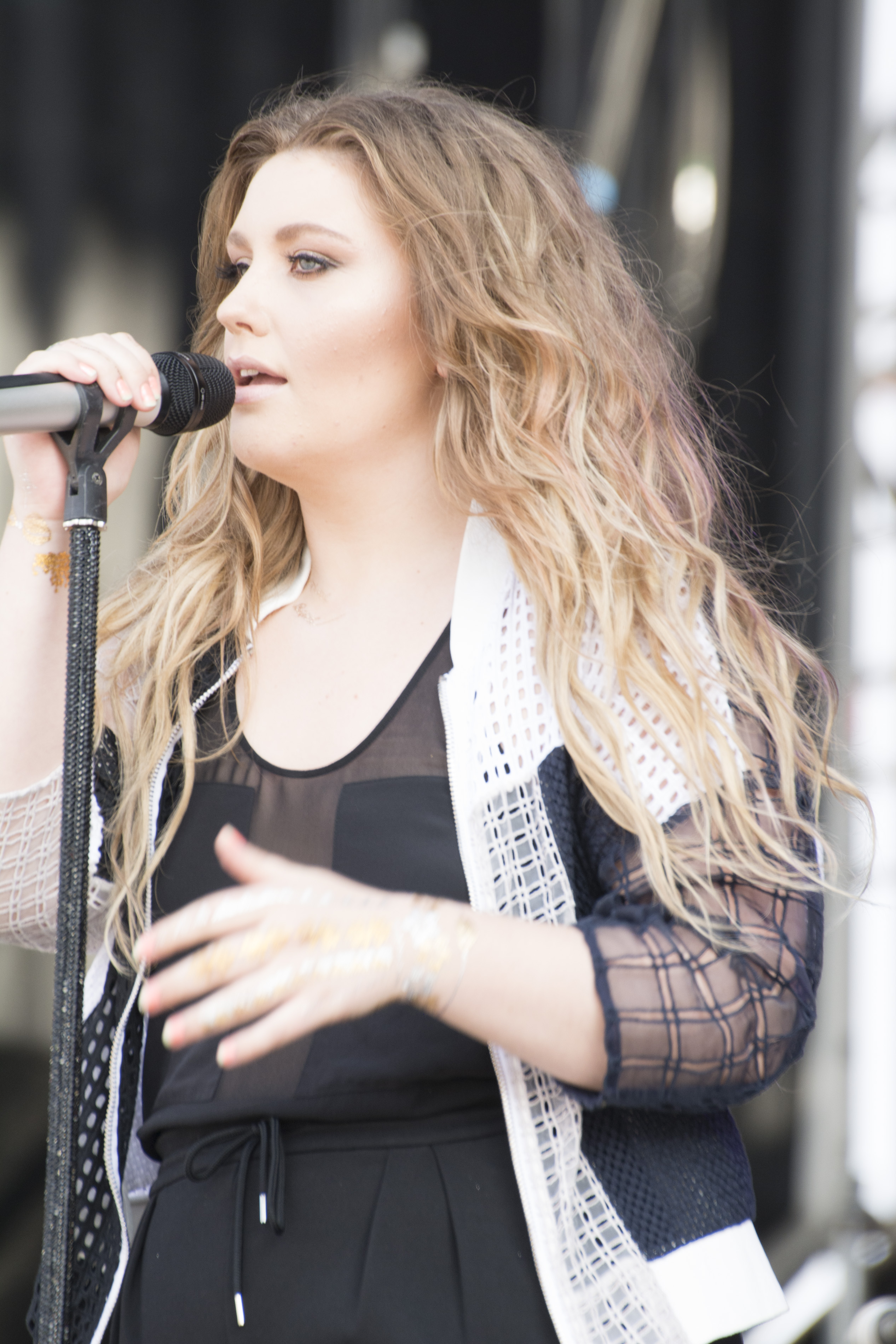
Ella Henderson performing at Gibraltar's 2015 Music Festival

English singer and songwriter Ella Henderson has recorded songs for two studio albums and two extended plays (EPs). She has also written for other artists, as well as featured on a number of singles as a guest vocalist. She began playing piano at the age of eleven and writing songs at thirteen. Her Scottish paternal grandfather was a source of inspiration for the singer. In 2012, at the age of 18, Henderson entered series nine of the X Factor (UK), finishing up seventh after losing a sing off with eventual winner James Arthur. Henderson became the opening act for his 2017 tour Back from the Edge and they co-write the 2021 song "Let's Go Home Together". Following her stint on the X Factor, Henderson signed with Simon Cowell's record label Syco Music and began work on her debut album. Chapter One was released in October 2014, topping the UK Albums Chart and spawning four singles. Henderson co-wrote all but one of the songs on Chapter One, including her debut single "Ghost" which topped the UK Singles Chart, "Yours" which reached number sixteen and "Mirror Man". The only song not written by Henderson was her second single "Glow", which reached number seven in the UK.

Although a second album was in production in 2016, Henderson experienced severe anxiety and ill mental health, resulting in a long delay between her first and second albums. During this time, she departed Syco Music in favour of a new deal with Major Tom's, the record label founded by British drum and bass band Rudimental. Between 2015 and 2019, Henderson appeared on high-profile releases from other artists including Sigma's "Glitterball", Kygo's "Here for You" and "Hold Me Close" by Sam Feldt. In 2019, Henderson released the EP Glorious, which she co-wrote. In 2021, Henderson released the aforementioned song "Let's Go Home Together", now re-recorded as a duet with Tom Grennan as opposed to Arthur who had co-written and originally featured on the song. It would feature on Henderson's second album Everything I Didn't Say, along with the single "Brave", and promotional singles including the title track and an EP for the song "Ugly". According to Henderson, for the production of her second album, she wrote over 400 songs.

She has a wide range of collaborators across her discography including production outfit TMS, Richard "Biff" Stannard and Noel Zancanella (of the band OneRepublic) who all collaborated with Henderson on both of her albums, as well as Jordan Riley who has co-writes and production credits across many of Henderson's standalone singles, features and Everything I Didn't Say. Henderson has also worked with British DJ Nathan Dawe, previously writing the song "Lighter" for him, and then collaborating in 2022 on Dawe's single "21 Reasons". That same year, Henderson was also co-lead artist on the song "Crazy What Love Can Do" with David Guetta and Becky Hill.

== List of songs ==
Key
†	Indicates songs that were released as singles with Henderson as the lead artist
#	Indicates songs that were released as singles with Henderson as a featured artist
‡	Indicates songs that were released a promotional singles

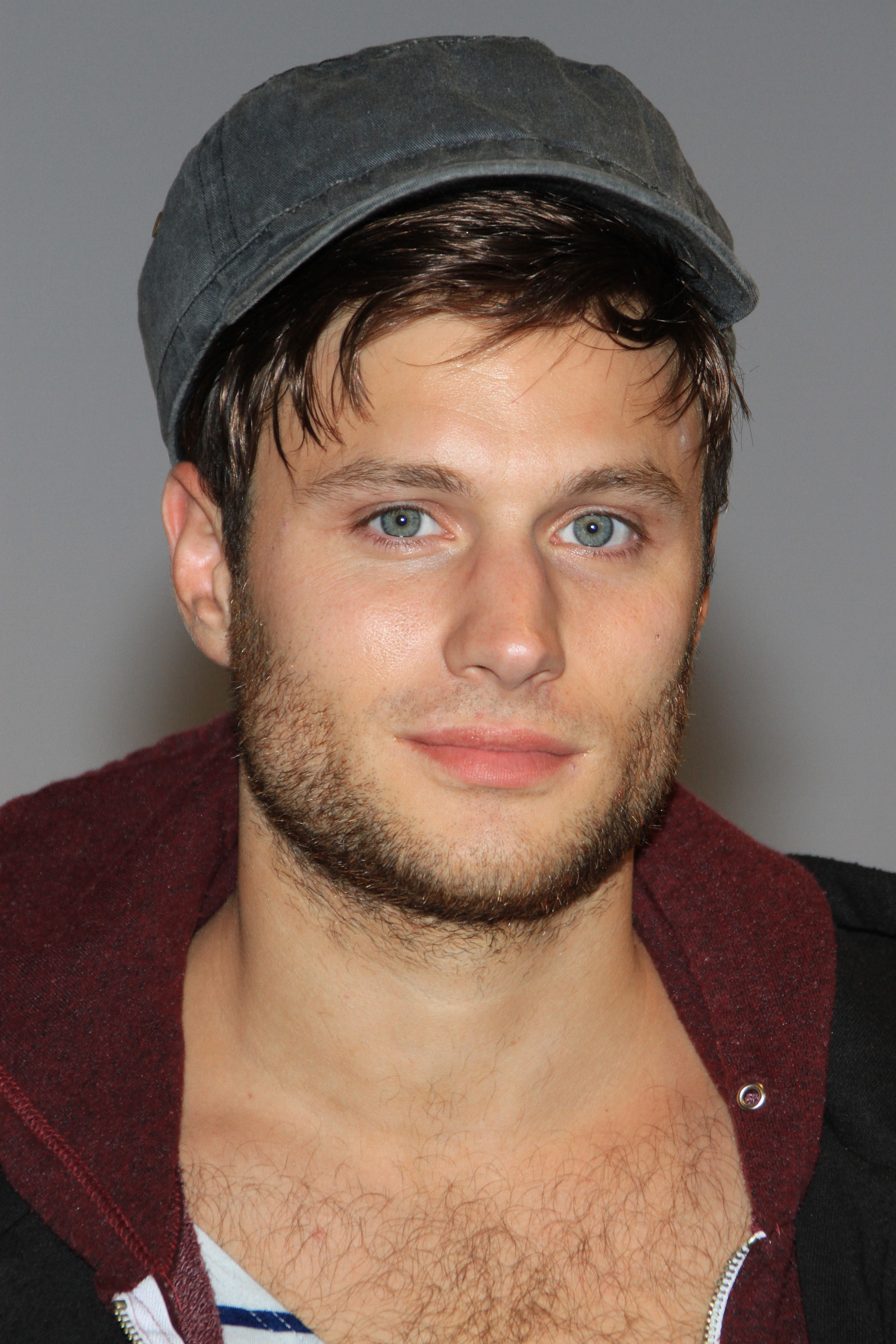
Jamie Scott has co-written the song "All Again" with Henderson.

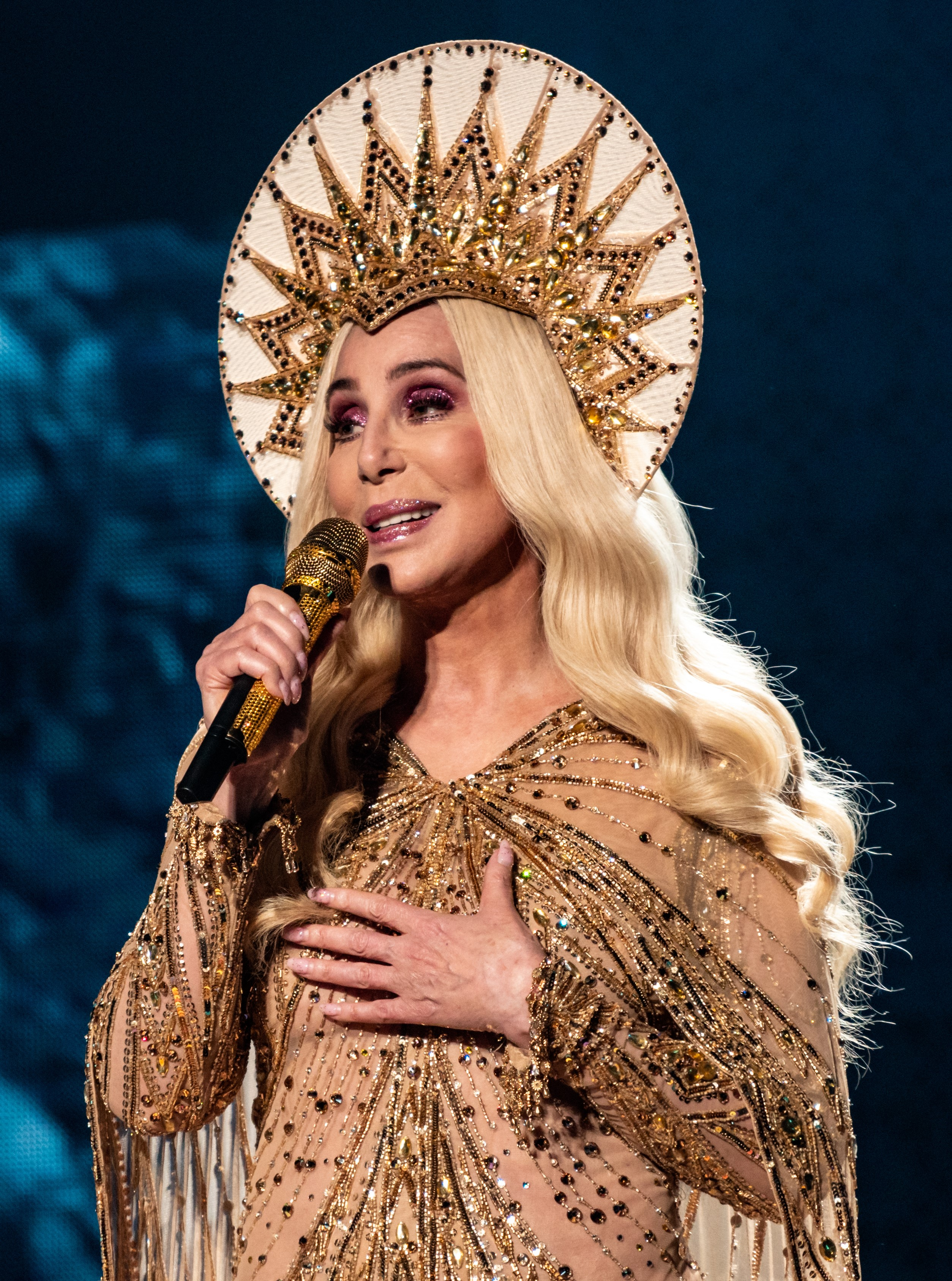
Henderson covered "Believe" by American singer and actress Cher during her stint on the X Factor. Cher praised the cover; Henderson would record an acoustic version for her debut album.

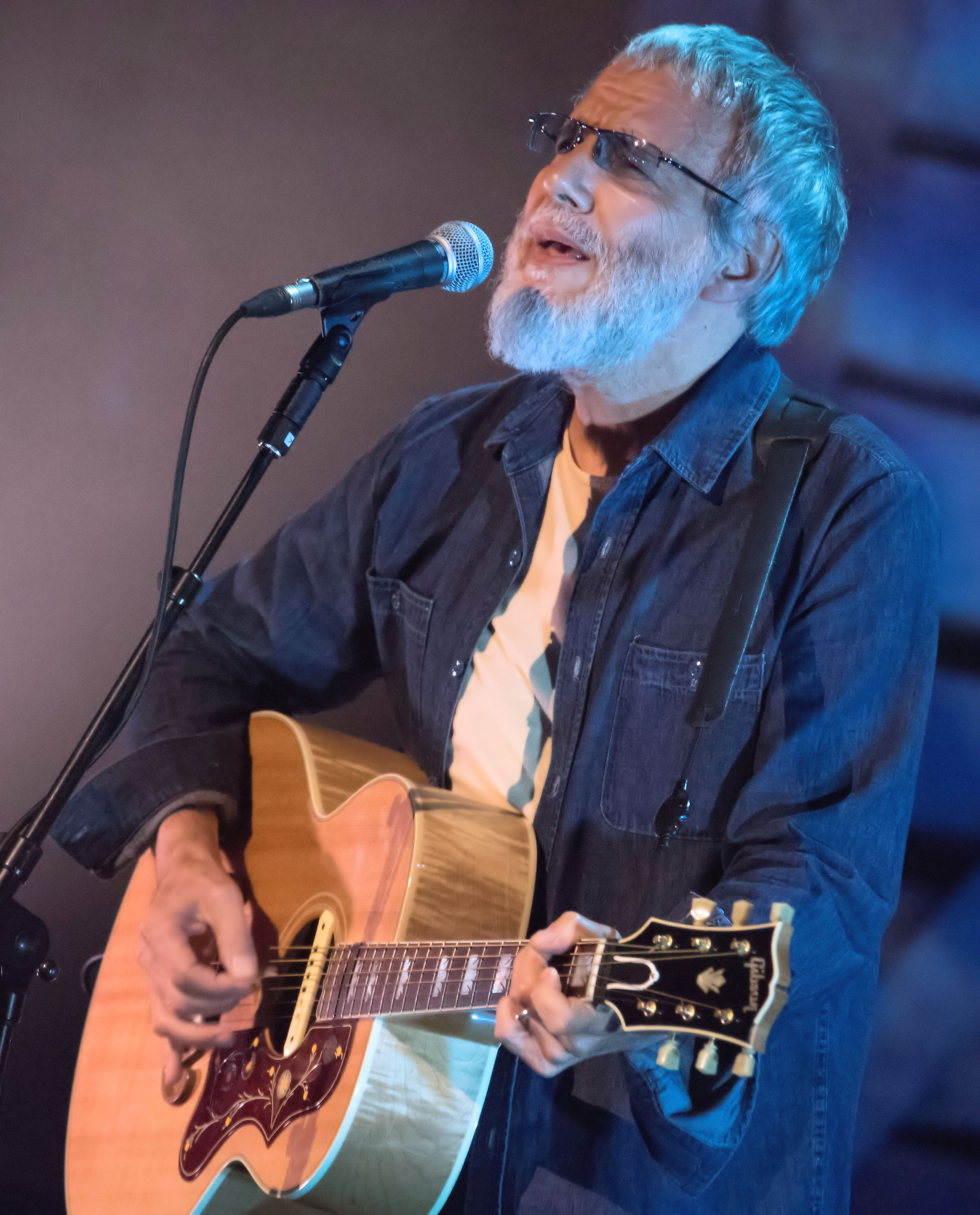
British folk singer Yusuf Islam co-wrote the song "Billie Halliday" for Henderson's debut Chapter One.

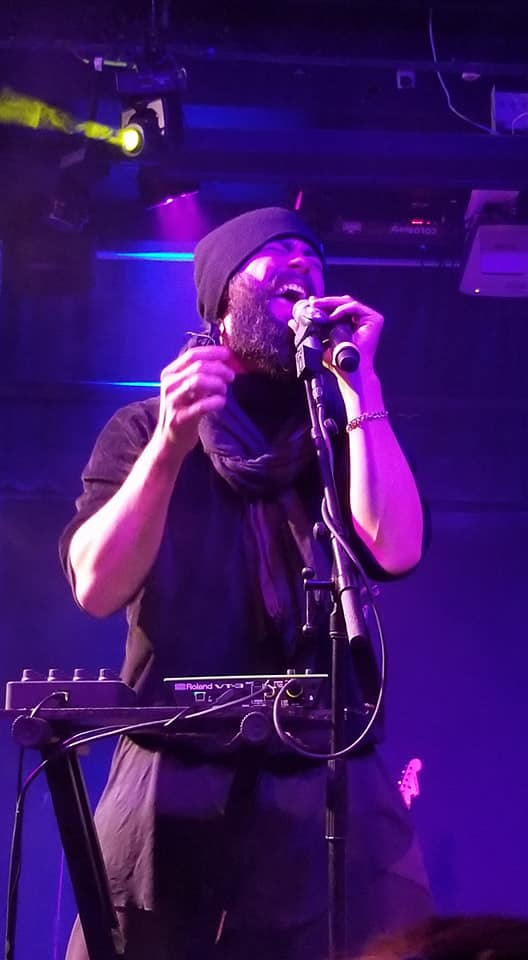
Nashville artist and producer Mikky Ekko co-wrote and features on the song "Cry On Me".

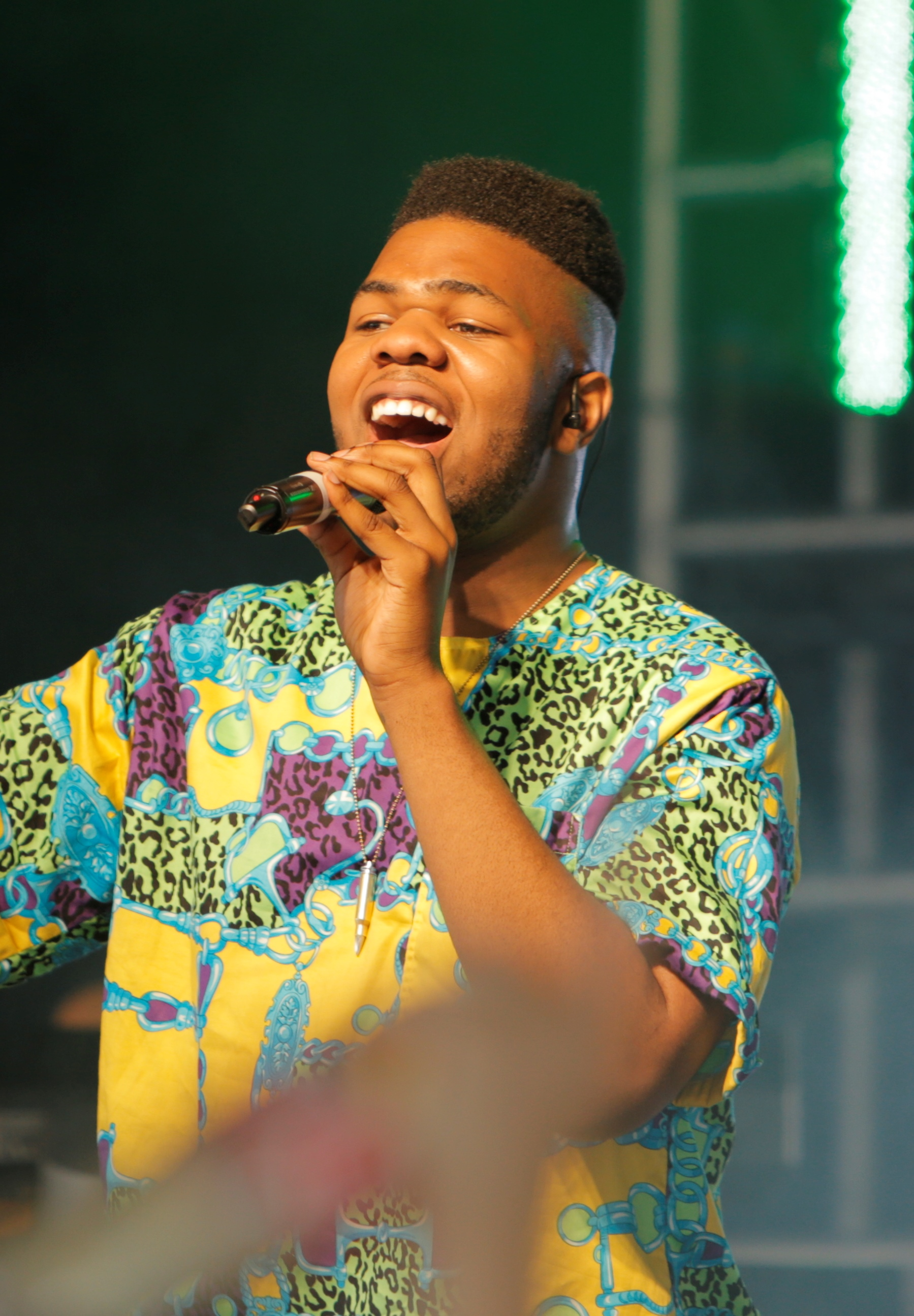
British musician MNEK co-wrote "Dream on Me" with Henderson, as well as her feature on Jax Jones' "This Is Real".

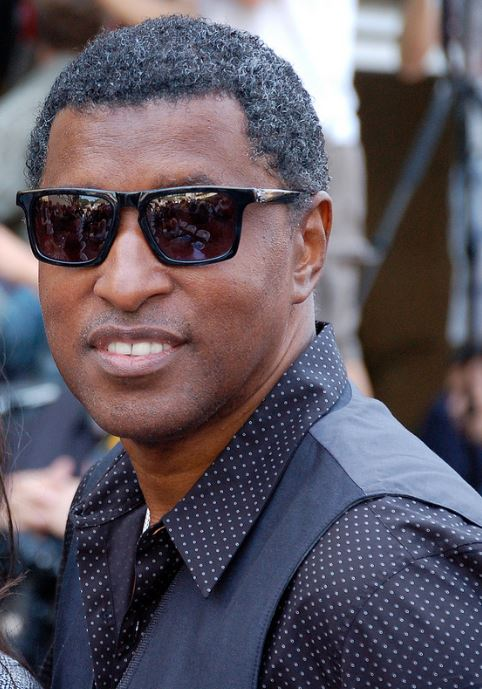
American producer Kenneth "Babyface" Edmonds worked with Henderson on the song "The First Time".

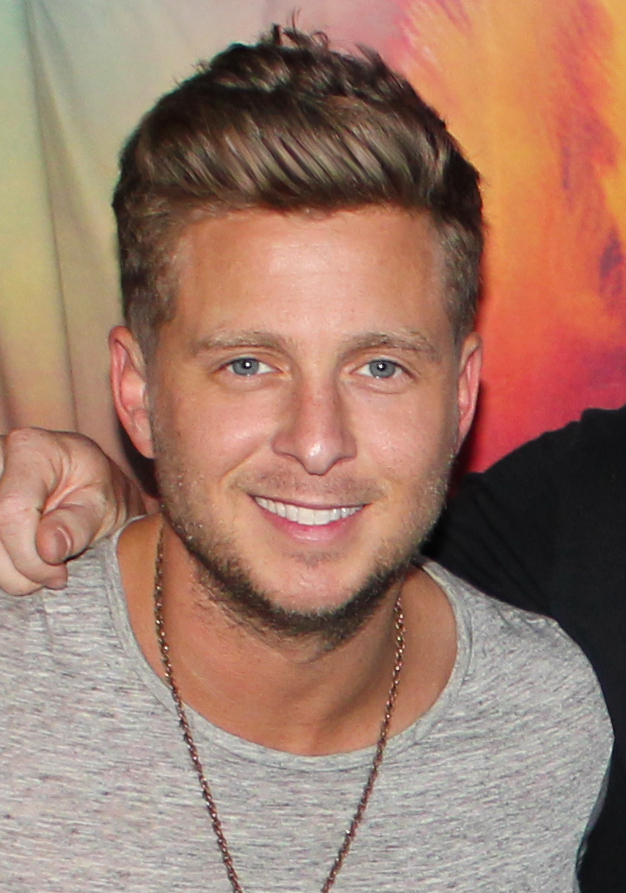
American musician Ryan Tedder helped to co-write "Ghost", Henderson's debut single.

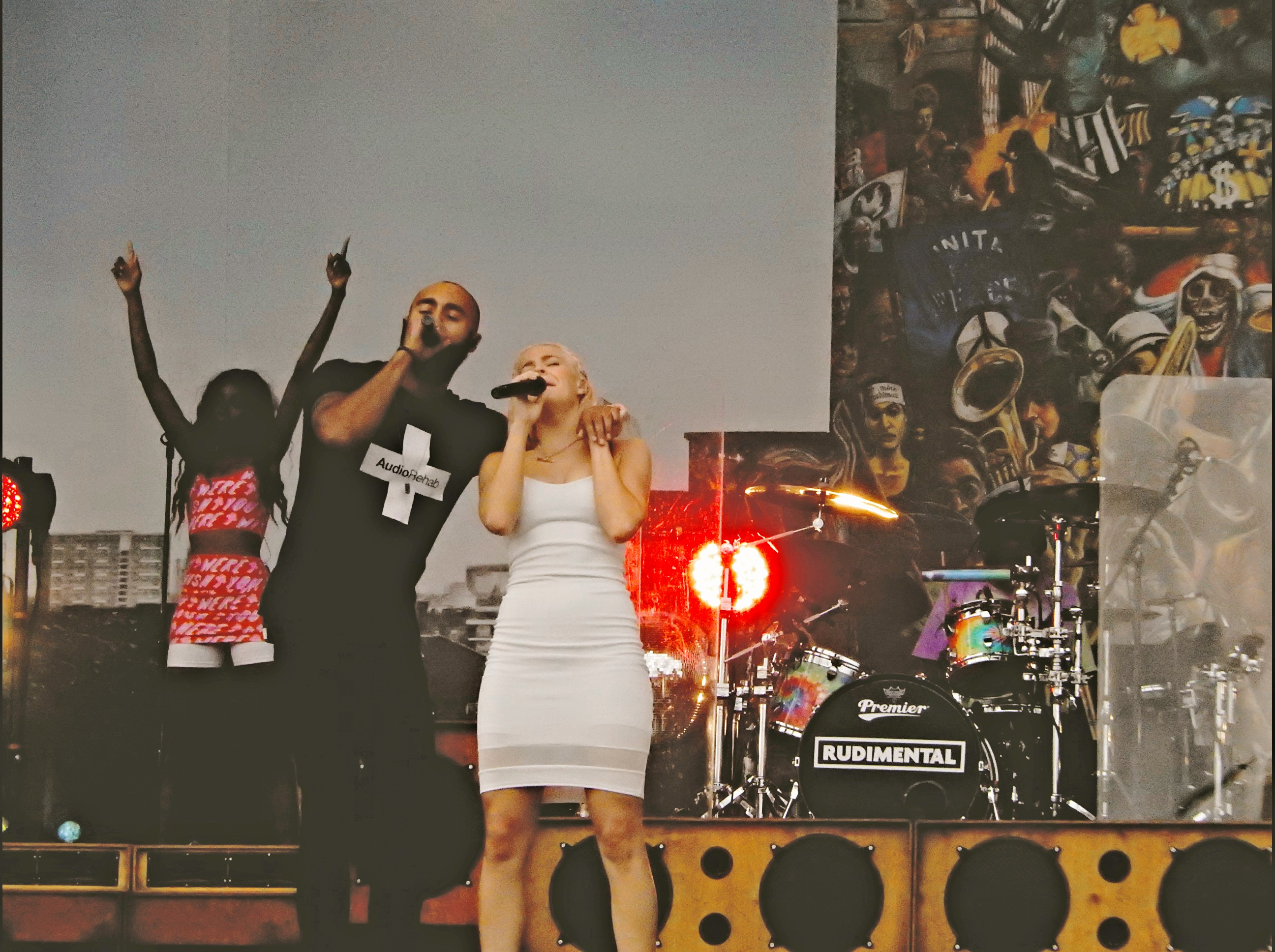
British drum and bass band Rudimental signed Henderson to their record label Major Tom's after she left Syco Music in 2016–17.

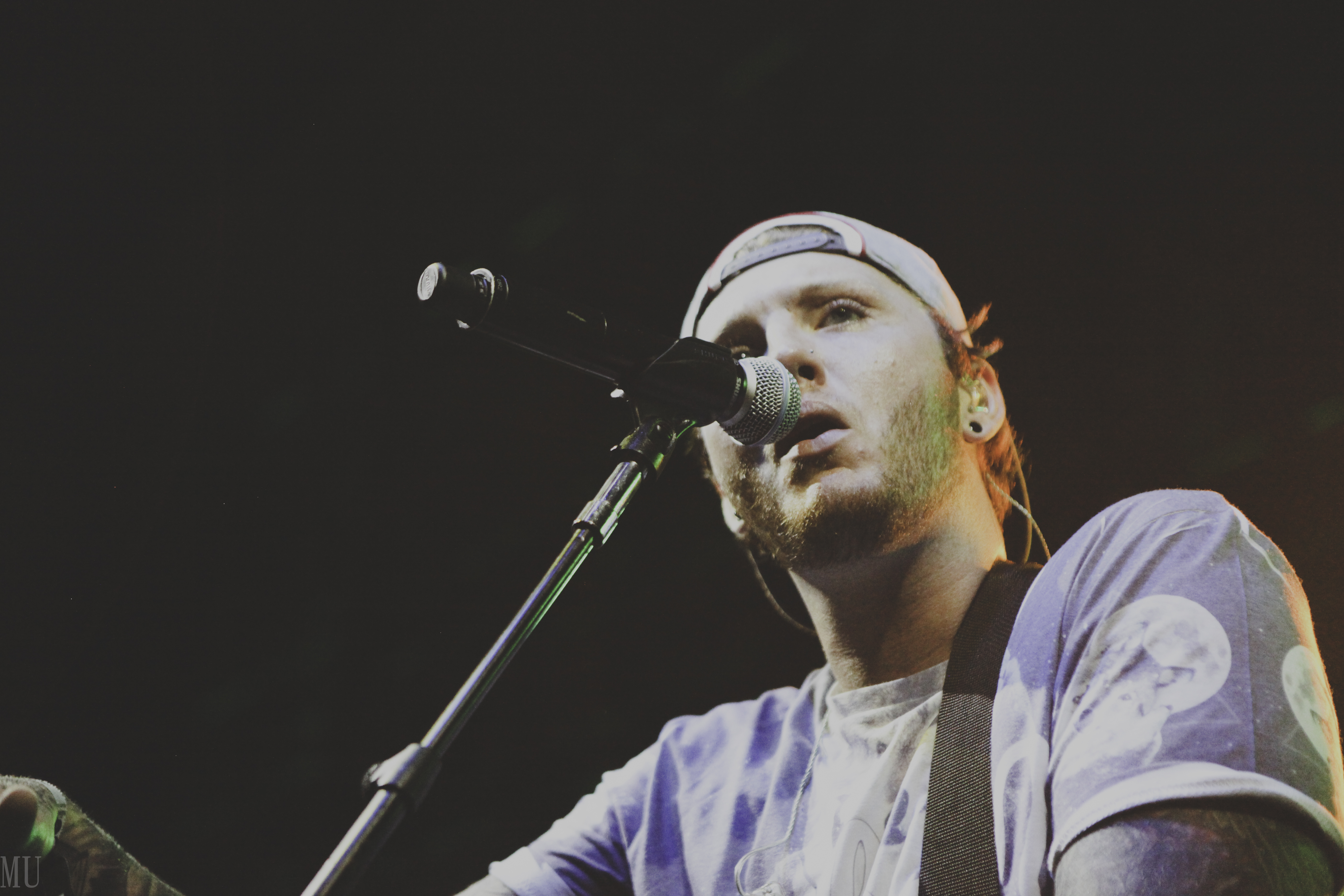
James Arthur co-wrote "Let's Go Home Together" with Henderson.

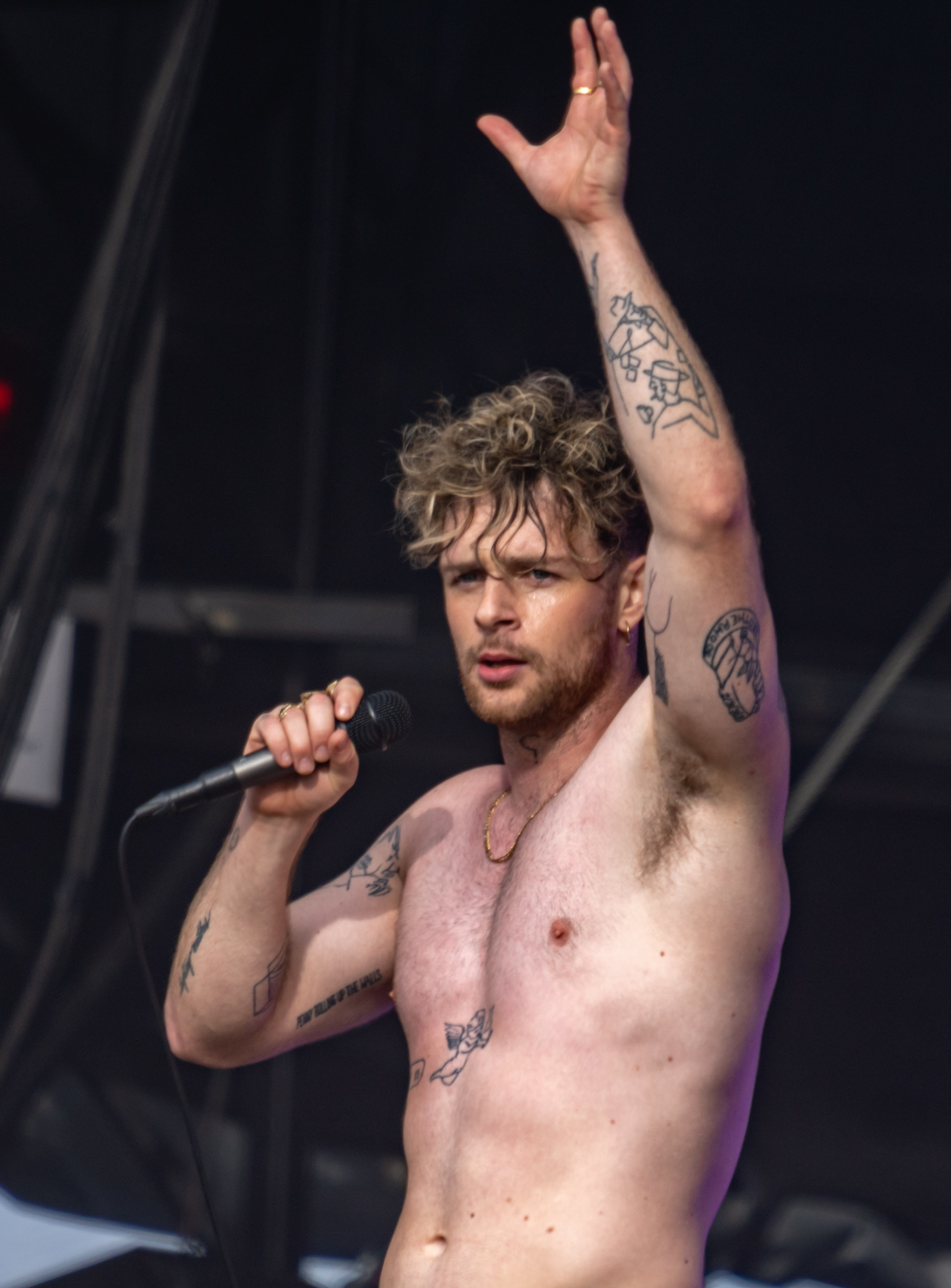
Due to scheduling clashes, Henderson asked Tom Grennan (pictured) to record James Arthur's part on her song "Let's Go Home Together".

List of songs including their parent album/release, writers and year of release
Song	Artist(s)	Writer(s)	Album	Year	Ref.
"0800 Heaven"†	Nathan Dawe, Joel Corry and Ella Henderson	Ella Henderson; Maegan Cottone; Joe Barbe; Joel Corry; John Morgan; Nathan Dawe; William Lansley	Stand-alone single	2023	
"1996"	Ella Henderson	Ella Henderson; Johan Carlsson	Chapter One	2014	
"21 Reasons" #	Nathan Dawe featuring Ella Henderson	Ella Henderson; John Nicholas Ealand Morgan; Maegan Cottone; Nathan John Dawe; Rune Reilly Koelsch; William Martyn Lansley	Stand-alone single	2022	
"All Again"	Ella Henderson	Ella Henderson; Jamie Scott	Chapter One	2014	
"All for You" #	Cian Ducrot and Ella Henderson	Cian Ducrot; Ella Henderson; Ollie Green	Stand-alone single	2022	
"Alibi"†	Ella Henderson featuring Rudimental	Ella Henderson; Artis Ivy Jr. Doug Rasheed; John Morgan; Larry Sanders; Maegan Cottone; Olivia Sebastianelli; Ruth-Anne Cunningham; Stevie Wonder; Will Lansley	Stand-alone single	2024	
"Bad News"	Ella Henderson	Ella Henderson; Olivia Sebastianelli; Steve Manovski	Everything I Didn't Say	2022	
"Beautifully Unfinished"	Ella Henderson	Ella Henderson; Steve Robson; Lindy Robbins	Chapter One	2014	
"Believe" (acoustic) (Note: This is a cover of the 1998 Cher song of the same name. It was included on iTunes store pre-orders of Chapter One and later, the deluxe edition on digital outlets.)	Ella Henderson	Ella Henderson; Steve Robson; Lindy Robbins	Chapter One	2014	
"Billie Halliday"	Ella Henderson	Ella Henderson; Richard "Biff" Stannard; Ash Howes; Braford Ellis; James Napier; Yusuf Islam	Chapter One	2014	
"Blame It on the Mistletoe" †	Ella Henderson and AJ Mitchell	Ella Henderson; Jez Ashurt; Julie Frost; Tre Jean-Marie	Stand-alone single	2020	
"Body"	Ella Henderson	Ella Henderson; Alexander Shuckburgh; Trey Campbell	Everything I Didn't Say	2022	
"Brave" †	Ella Henderson	Ella Henderson; Jennifer Decilveo; Jordan Riley	Everything I Didn't Say	2022	
"Bridge over Troubled Water" #	Artists for Grenfell (Note: The following artists came together to record this song for the Grenfell Tower fire: Stormzy, Robbie Williams, James Blunt, Rita Ora, Craig David, Dan Smith (of Bastille), Liam Payne, Emeli Sandé, Kelly Jones (of Stereophonics), Paloma Faith, Louis Tomlinson, Labrinth, Jorja Smith, WSTRN, Leona Lewis, Jessie J, James Arthur, Roger Daltrey (of The Who), Ella Eyre, Anne-Marie, Ella Henderson, Louisa Johnson, 5 After Midnight, Angel, Carl Barât (of The Libertines), Deno, Donae'o, Dua Lipa, Fleur East, Gareth Malone and The Choir for Grenfell,Geri Halliwell (of Spice Girls), Gregory Porter, Jessie Ware, John Newman, Jon McClure (of Reverend and The Makers), London Community Gospel Choir, Matt Goss, Matt Terry, Mr Eazi, Nathan Sykes, Omar, Pixie Lott, Ray BLK, Raye, Shakka, Shane Filan (of Westlife), Tom Grennan, Tony Hadley (of Spandau Ballet), Tulisa. The following artists also contributed instrumentation: Brian May (of Queen) – guitar, Nile Rodgers – guitar, Tokio Myers – piano and Pete Townshend (of The Who) – guitar.)	Paul Simon	Stand-alone single	2017	
"Crazy What Love Can Do" †	David Guetta, Becky Hill and Ella Henderson	Ella Henderson; Becky Hill; David Guetta; Jordan Riley; Lewis Thompson; Naeve Applebaum; Rob Harvey	Stand-alone single	2022	
"Cry On Me"	Ella Henderson featuring Mikky Ekko	Ella Henderson; Mikky Ekko; Ollie Green	Everything I Didn't Say	2022	
"Dream on Me" † (Note: "Dream on Me" samples the 2001 song "Another Chance" by Roger Sanchez, written by Sanchez and Steve Lukather.)	Ella Henderson and Roger Sanchez	Ella Henderson; Jordan Riley; Roger Sanchez; Uzoechi Emenike; Wrabel; Steve Lukather	Stand-alone single	2020	
"Emotions"	Ella Henderson	Ella Henderson; Jordan Riley	Everything I Didn't Say	2022	
"Empire"	Ella Henderson	Ella Henderson; Ben Kohn; Camille Purcell; Pete Kelleher; Tom Barnes	Chapter One	2014	
"Everything I Didn't Say" ‡	Ella Henderson	Ella Henderson; Mike Kintish	Everything I Didn't Say	2022	
"The First Time"	Ella Henderson	Ella Henderson; Antonio Lamar Dixon; Kenny "Babyface" Edmonds	Chapter One	2014	
"Five Tattoos"	Ella Henderson	Ella Henderson; Darren Alboni	Chapter One	2014	
"Friends" †	Ella Henderson	Ella Henderson; Alex Stacey; Daniel Davidsen; Peter Wallevik	Glorious EP	2019	
"Ghost" †	Ella Henderson	Ella Henderson; Ryan Tedder; Noel Zancanella	Chapter One	2014	
"Giants"	Ella Henderson	Ella Henderson; Steve Robson; Claude Kelly	Chapter One	2014	
"Give Your Heart Away" (Note: An acoustic version of "Give Your Heart Away" appeared on the iTunes pre-order for the deluxe edition of Chapter One (2014).)	Ella Henderson	Ella Henderson; Johan Carlosson	Chapter One	2014	
"Glitterball" #	Sigma featuring Ella Henderson	Wayne Hector; Jim Eliot; Mima Stilwell	Life	2015	
"Glorious" †	Ella Henderson	Ella Henderson; Louis Schoorl; Natalie Dunn; Marco Daniel Borrero	Glorious EP	2014	
"Glow" †	Ella Henderson	Camille Purcell; Steve Mac	Chapter One	2014	
"Good Things Take Time"	Ella Henderson	Ella Henderson; Hannes Roovers; Isac Hördegård; Moa Pettersson Hammar	Everything I Didn't Say	2022	
"Handle My Own"	Rudimental featuring Ella Henderson	Amir Izadkhah; Piers Aggett; Kesi Dryden; Leon "DJ Locksmith" Rolle; Ella Henderson; Samuel de Jong; Kenneth Gamble; Leon Huff	Ground Control	2021	
"Hard Work" ‡	Ella Henderson	Ella Henderson; Salaam Remi	Chapter One	2014	
"Heartstrings" †	M-22 and Ella Henderson	Ella Henderson; Adrien Nookadu; Frank Sanders; Josh Record; Matt James Humphrey	Stand-alone single	2022	
"Here for You" #	Kygo featuring Ella Henderson	Kyrre Gørvell-Dahll; Ella Henderson	Stand-alone single	2015	
"Hold Me Close" #	Sam Feldt featuring Ella Henderson	Ella Henderson; Dom Lyttle; Hannes Roovers; Isac Hördegård; Moa Pettersson Hammar; Sammy Renders; Sophie Alexandra Tweed–Simmons	Stand-alone single	2020	
"Hold on Me"	Ella Henderson	Ella Henderson; Ollie Green; Neil Ormandy	Glorious EP	2019	
"Hurricane" †	Ofenbach and Ella Henderson	César de Rummel; Dorian Lauduique; Janik Riegert; Josh Tapen; Marc Buhr	Stand-alone single	2021	
"I'm Going Through Hell"	Paige Dougall featuring Ella Henderson	Paige Dougall	Stand-alone single	2021	
"Lay Down"	Ella Henderson	Ella Henderson; Ben Kohn; Pete Kelleher; Tom Barnes	Chapter One	2014	
"Let's Go Home Together" † (Note: "Let's Go Home Together" was originally recorded as a duet between Henderson and James Arthur. Due to schedule clashes, the two could not find time to promote the song together so it was re-recorded to feature fellow British singer Tom Grennan.)	Ella Henderson featuring Tom Grennan	Ella Henderson; Ben Kohn; Pete "Merf" Kelleher; Tom "Froe" Barnes; James Arthur	Everything I Didn't Say	2021	
"Lighter" (acoustic) †	Nathan Dawe featuring KSI and Ella Henderson	Ella Henderson; Jonny Lattimer; Nathan Dawe; Olajide Olatunji; Tre Jean-Marie	Stand-alone single	2020	
"Like I Used To"†	Sonny Fodera, Paul Woolford and Ella Henderson	Ella Henderson; Conor Blake; Paul Woolford; Sonny Fodera	Stand-alone single	2020	
"Mirror Man" †	Ella Henderson	Ella Henderson; Al Shux; Laura Pergolizzi	Chapter One	2014	
"Missed"	Ella Henderson	Ella Henderson; Darren Alboni; Christian Gilbart	Chapter One	2014	
"No Sleep"†	Regard and Ella Henderson	Ella Henderson; Georgia Ku; Mark Ralph; Bryn Christopher; Naitumela Masuku; Regard; Sinai Tedros	Stand-alone single	2023	
"Northern Lights"	Ella Henderson	Ella Henderson; Jordan Riley	Everything I Didn't Say	2022	
"Out My Head"	Ella Henderson	Ella Henderson; Olivia Sebastianelli; Toby Scott	Everything I Didn't Say	2022	
"Pieces"	Ella Henderson	Ella Henderson; Ben Kohn; Pete Kelleher; Tom Barnes; Johan Carlsson	Chapter One	2014	
"Places"	Ella Henderson	Ella Henderson; Malcolm "Bubba" McCarthy; Olivia Sebastianelli; Richard "Biff" Stannard	Everything I Didn't Say	2022	
"React" #	Switch Disco featuring Ella Henderson	Ella Henderson; Maegan Cottone; Robert Miles	Stand-alone single	2023	
"Risk It All" †	Ella Henderson, House Gospel Choir and Just Kiddin	Ella Henderson; Charlotte Haining; Lewis Thomson; Rob Harvey	Stand-alone single	2021	
"Rockets" (Note: An acoustic version of "Rockets" appeared on the iTunes pre-order for the deluxe edition of Chapter One (2014).)	Ella Henderson	Ella Henderson; Claude Kelly; Steve Robson	Chapter One	2014	
"Set in Stone"	Ella Henderson	Lewis Daniel Thompson; Olivia Sebastianelli; Rob Harvey	Everything I Didn't Say	2022	
"Sorry That I Miss You"	Ella Henderson	Ella Henderson; Steph Jones; Andreas Carlsson; Johan Carlsson	Everything I Didn't Say	2022	
"Take Care of You" †	Ella Henderson	Ella Henderson; Noel Zancanella; Justin Tranter; Julia Michaels	Stand-alone single	2020	
"Thank You for the Hell"	Ella Henderson	Ella Henderson; Jordan Riley	Everything I Didn't Say	2022	
"This Is Real" # (Note: A version of "This Is Real" was also recorded by Selena Gomez but the collaboration was rejected by Gomez's label, leading to Henderson's version being released after also previously being rejected.)	Jax Jones featuring Ella Henderson	Ella Henderson; Timucin Aluo; Uzoechi Emenike; Maegan Cottone	Snacks (Supersize)	2019	
"Ugly" ‡ (Note: An EP featuring acoustic versions of "Ugly", "Brave" and "Everything I didn't Say" was released on 25 March 2022. A week later, a second EP featuring the acoustic version of "Ugly" as well as the album and Madasim versions was released.)	Ella Henderson	Ella Henderson; Ben Ash; Mathew Thomas Paul Holmes; Philip Anthony Leigh; Sasha Sloan	Everything I Didn't Say and Ugly (acoustic) EP	2022	
"We Got Love" #	Sigala featuring Ella Henderson	Ella Henderson; Anne-Marie; Derrick May; Janée "Jin Jin" Bennett; Joakim Jarl; Michael James; Nick Gale; Sigala; Thomas Jules	Everything I Didn't Say	2022	
"What About Us"	Ella Henderson	Ella Henderson; Jordan Riley; Rob Harvey; Tre Jean-Marie	Everything I Didn't Say	2022	
"Young" †	Ella Henderson	Ella Henderson; Jordan Riley	Glorious EP	2019	
"Yours" †	Ella Henderson	Ella Henderson; Josh Record	Chapter One	2014	

== Unreleased songs ==
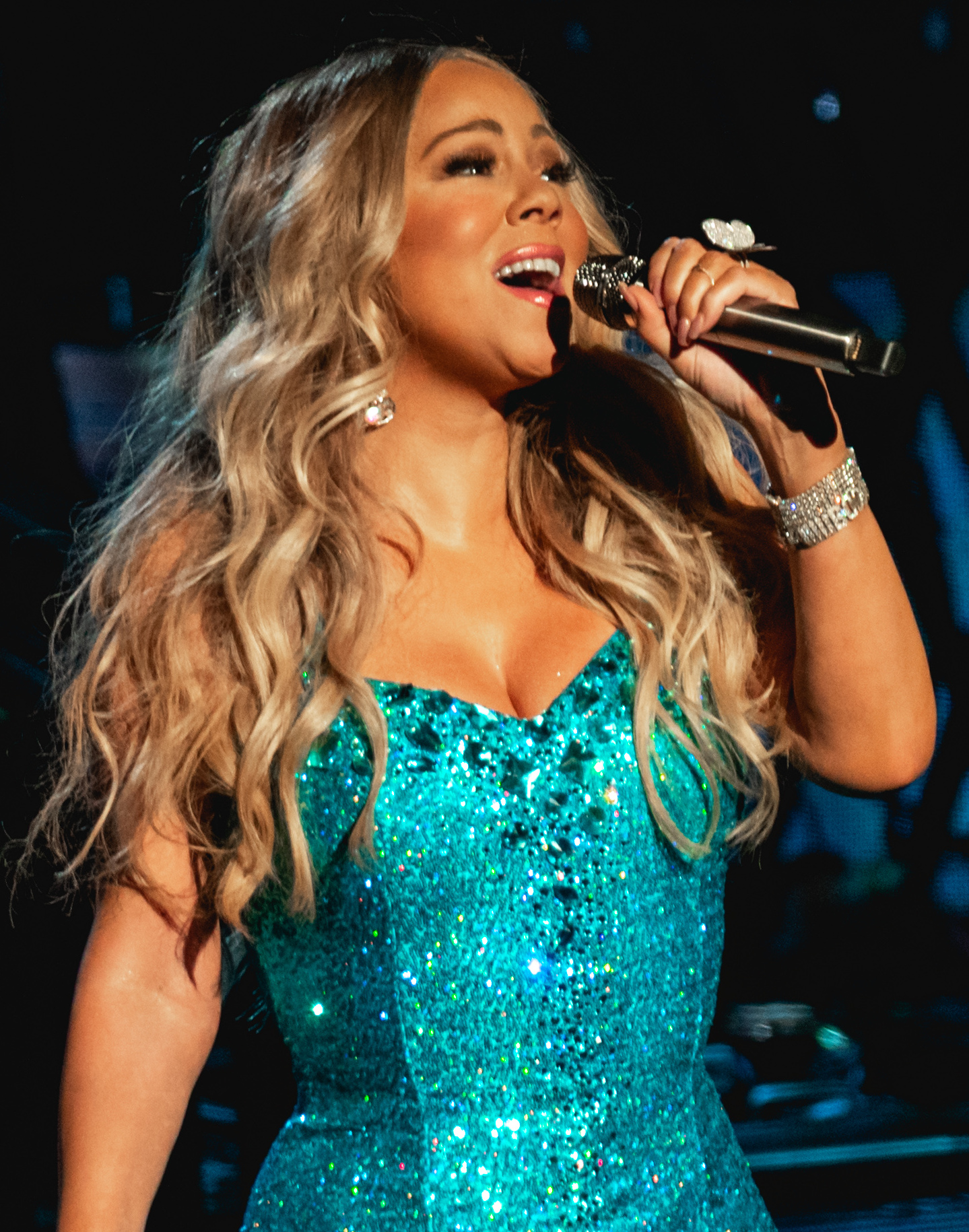
Henderson covered "All I Want for Christmas is You" by American artist Mariah Carey.

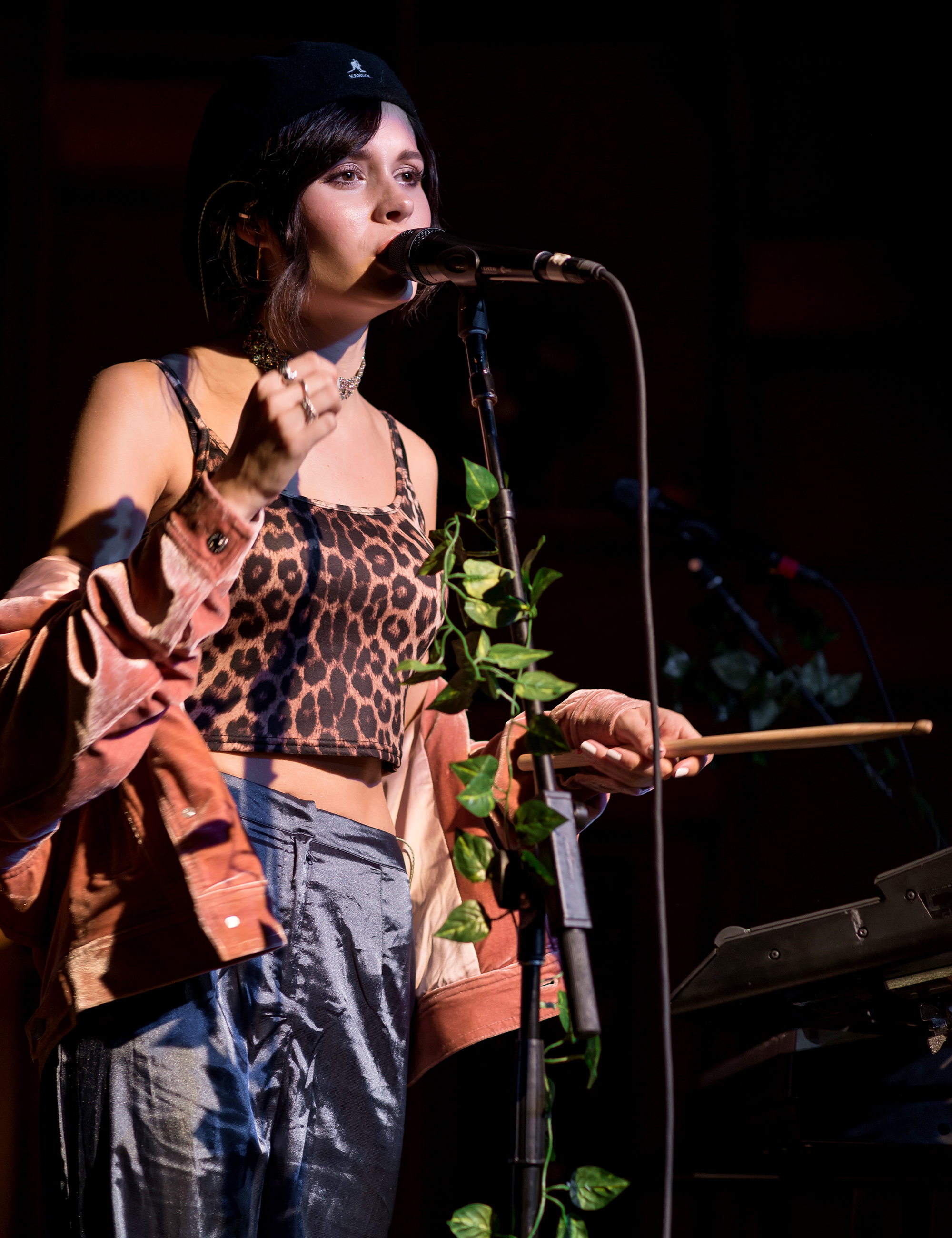
Scottish singer Nina Nesbitt collaborated with Henderson, helping to write the song "All of You or Nothing".

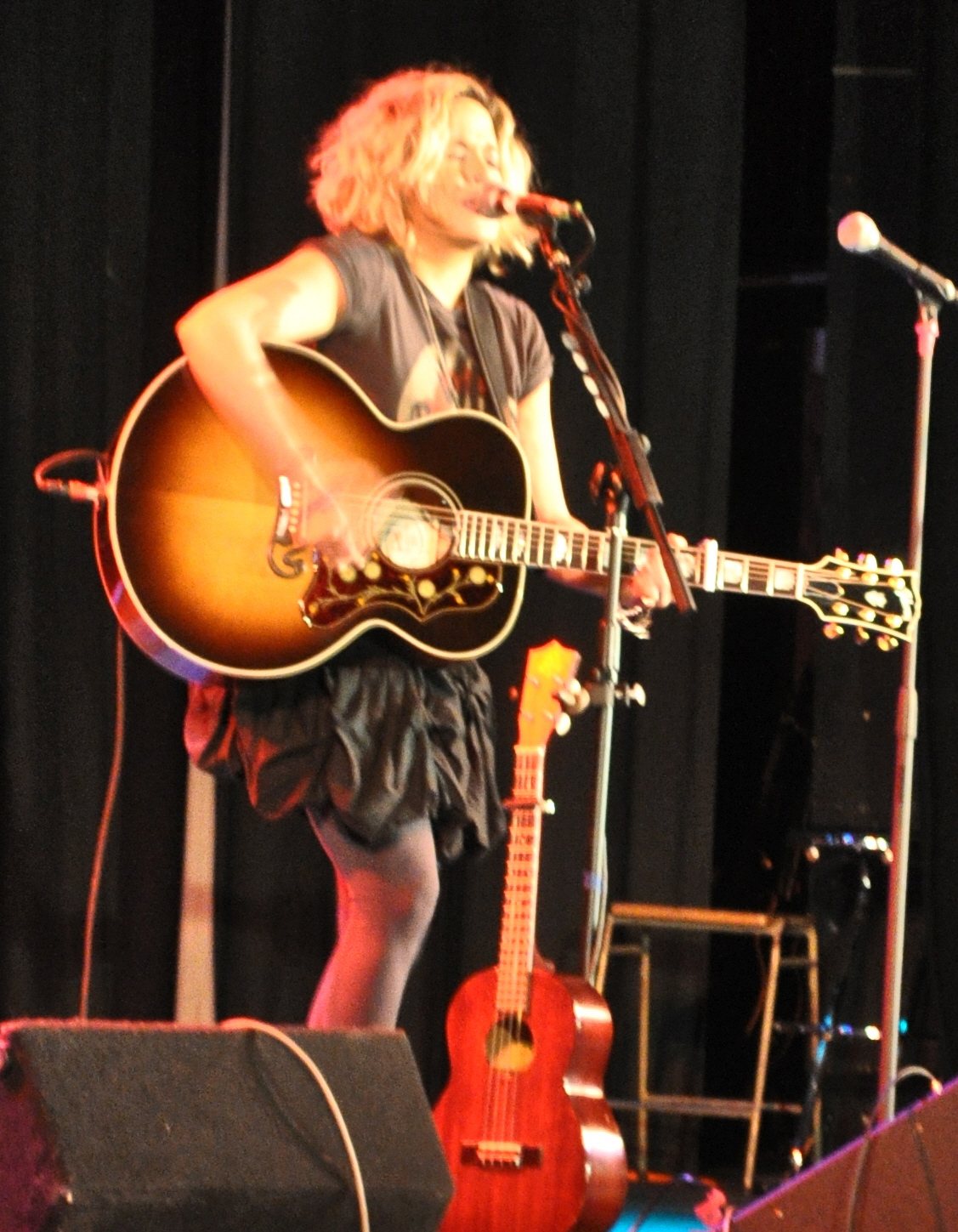
English singer and songwriter Amy Wadge co-wrote "If It Was Ever Love" with Henderson and American producer Al Shux.

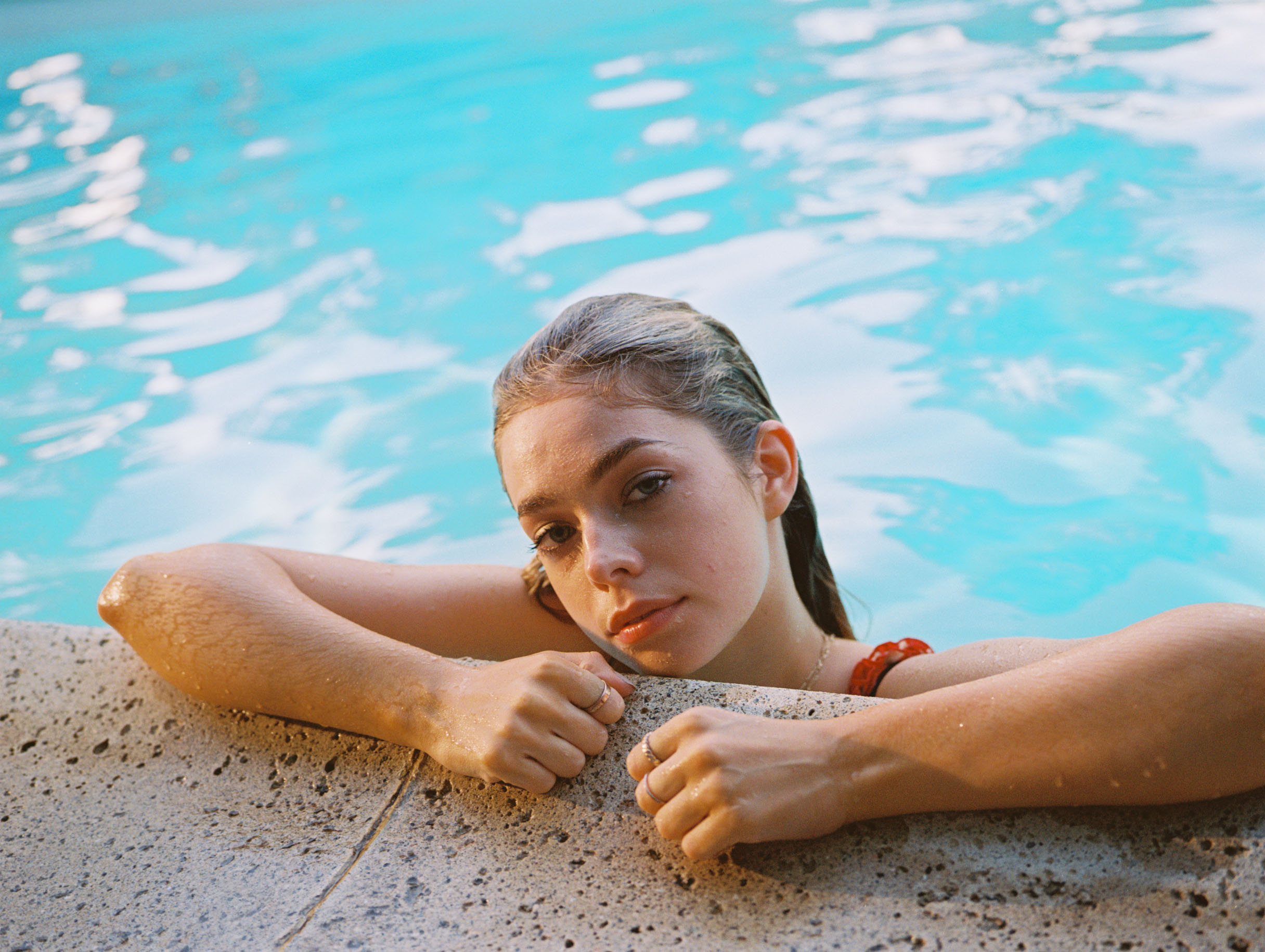
English singer and songwriter Olivia Devine helped to write the song "Who Am I".

List of unreleased songs registered to Henderson or known to have been recorded by Henderson
Song	Notes	Ref.
"All I Want for Christmas Is You"	A cover of the song of the same name by Mariah Carey; Written by Walter Afanasieff and Carey; Registered at American Society of Composers, Authors and Publishers (ASCAP)	
"All of You or Nothing"	Written by Jake Gosling, Chris Leonard and Nina Nesbitt; Registered at American Society of Composers, Authors and Publishers (ASCAP)	
"Brother"	Written by Henderson, Johan Carlsson and Peter Rycroft; Registered at American Society of Composers, Authors and Publishers (ASCAP)	
"Crown"	Written by Henderson, Iain James and Martin Sjølie; Registered at American Society of Composers, Authors and Publishers (ASCAP)	
"Cry Like a Woman"	Written by Henderson, Trevor Brown, Warren "Okay" Felder and William Simmons; Registered at American Society of Composers, Authors and Publishers (ASCAP)	
"Dark Cloud"	Written by Henderson and Francis White; Registered at American Society of Composers, Authors and Publishers (ASCAP)	
"Everybody Outta Know"	Written by Jimmy Harry and Iman Jordan; Registered at American Society of Composers, Authors and Publishers (ASCAP)	
"Figure Me Out"	Written by Henderson, Neil Ormandy and Steve Solomon; Registered at American Society of Composers, Authors and Publishers (ASCAP)	
"Grown"	Written by Henderson, Jake Gosling and Evan "Kidd" Bogart; Registered at American Society of Composers, Authors and Publishers (ASCAP)	
"Hard to Love"	Written by Henderson, and Paul O'Duffy; Registered at American Society of Composers, Authors and Publishers (ASCAP)	
"Home"	Written by Henderson, Mikky Ekko and Olivia Sebastianelli; Registered at American Society of Composers, Authors and Publishers (ASCAP)	
"If It Was Ever Love"	Written by Henderson, Alexander Shuckbergh and Amy Wadge; Registered at American Society of Composers, Authors and Publishers (ASCAP)	
"Life Me Up"	Written by Henderson, Richard Dinsdale, Conor Manning, Camden Milligan-Cox and Autumn Rowe; Registered at American Society of Composers, Authors and Publishers (ASCAP)	
"Lions"	Written by Henderson, Clarence Coffee and Steve Robson; Registered at American Society of Composers, Authors and Publishers (ASCAP)	
"Little Solder"	Written by Henderson and Jake Gosling; Registered at American Society of Composers, Authors and Publishers (ASCAP)	
"Never Give Up on Love"	Written by Henderson and Jake Gosling; Registered at American Society of Composers, Authors and Publishers (ASCAP)	
"Paperback Love"	Written by Henderson, Jonathan Coffer, Alan Lomax and Jamie Scott; Registered at American Society of Composers, Authors and Publishers (ASCAP)	
"Pick Me Up"	Written by Henderson, James Needle and John Ryan; Registered at American Society of Composers, Authors and Publishers (ASCAP)	
"Tightrope"	Written by Henderson, Clarence Coffee and Jonathan Coffer; Registered at American Society of Composers, Authors and Publishers (ASCAP)	
"Warpath"	Written by Henderson, Jimmy Hogarth and Olivia Sebastianello; Registered at American Society of Composers, Authors and Publishers (ASCAP)	
"Who Am I"	Also known under the alternative title of "Who Am I?"; Written by Henderson, Olivia Sebastianello, Jez Ashurst, Olivia Devine, Toby Scott and Alex Stacey; Registered at American Society of Composers, Authors and Publishers (ASCAP)	
