= Ella Henderson discography =

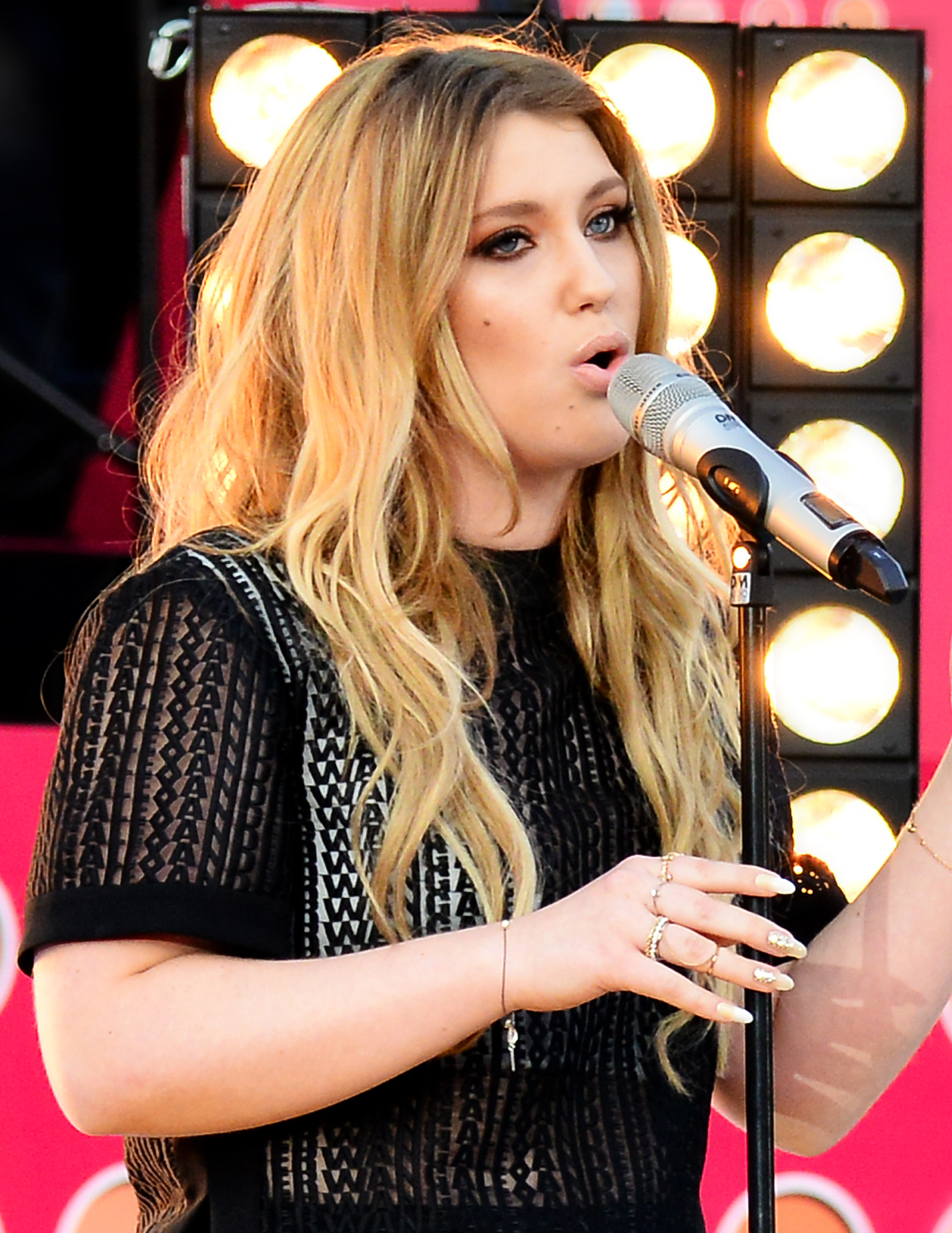
- Henderson performing in 2014
- Studio albums: 2
- EPs: 1
- Singles: 30
- Music videos: 17
- Promotional singles: 3

This is the discography of English singer Ella Henderson. Her debut studio album, Chapter One, was released in October 2014. The album spent its first week of release at number one on the UK Albums Chart. The album includes the singles "Ghost", "Glow", "Yours" and "Mirror Man". Her debut extended play, Glorious, was released in November 2019. The EP includes the singles "Glorious", "Young" and "Friends".

== Studio albums ==
Title	Details	Peak chart positions										Certifications
Title	Details	UK	AUS	AUT	DEN	GER	IRE	NZ	SWE	SWI	US	Certifications
Chapter One	Released: 13 October 2014; Label: Syco; Formats: CD, digital download	1	11	14	17	22	4	9	34	9	11	BPI: Platinum; IFPI DEN: Gold; RMNZ: Gold
Everything I Didn't Say	Released: 11 March 2022; Label: Major Toms, Asylum; Formats: CD, cassette, digital download, streaming	8	—	—	—	—	30	—	—	—	—	BPI: Gold
"—" denotes a recording that did not chart or was not released in that territory.

== Extended plays ==
Title	Details
Glorious	Released: 8 November 2019; Label: Major Toms, Asylum; Formats: Digital download, streaming
Ugly (Acoustic)	Released: 25 March 2022; Label: Major Toms, Asylum; Formats: Streaming

== Singles ==
=== As lead artist ===
Title	Year	Peak chart positions										Certifications	Album
Title	Year	UK	AUS	AUT	CAN	GER	IRE	NZ	SWE	SWI	US	Certifications	Album
"Ghost"	2014	1	3	2	12	3	1	4	11	10	21	BPI: 3× Platinum; ARIA: 3× Platinum; BVMI: Platinum; IFPI SWE: Gold; IFPI SWI: Gold; RIAA: Platinum; RMNZ: 2× Platinum	Chapter One
"Glow"	2014	7	49	—	—	—	17	26	—	—	—	BPI: Silver	Chapter One
"Yours"	2014	16	—	—	—	—	41	—	—	—	—	BPI: Platinum	Chapter One
"Mirror Man"	2015	96	—	—	—	—	—	—	—	—	—		Chapter One
"Glorious"	2019	— (Note: "Glorious" did not enter the UK Singles Chart, but peaked at number 40 on the UK Singles Downloads Chart.)	—	—	—	—	—	—	—	—	—		Glorious
"Young"	2019	—	—	—	—	—	—	—	—	—	—		Glorious
"Friends"	2019	—	—	—	—	—	—	—	—	—	—		Glorious
"Take Care of You"	2020	50	—	—	—	—	79	—	—	—	—	BPI: Silver	Everything I Didn't Say and More
"Dream on Me" (with Roger Sanchez)	2020	— (Note: "Dream on Me" did not enter the UK Singles Chart, but peaked at number 31 on the UK Singles Downloads Chart.)	—	—	—	—	—	—	—	—	—		Everything I Didn't Say and More
"Blame It on the Mistletoe" (with AJ Mitchell)	2020	—	—	—	—	75	94	— (Note: "Blame It on the Mistletoe" did not enter the NZ Top 40 Singles Chart, but peaked at number 28 on the NZ Hot Singles Chart.)	—	—	—		Non-album single
"Let's Go Home Together" (with Tom Grennan)	2021	10	—	—	—	—	11	—	—	—	—	BPI: 2× Platinum; RMNZ: Gold	Everything I Didn't Say
"Risk It All" (with House Gospel Choir and Just Kiddin)	2021	100	—	—	—	—	—	—	—	—	—		Everything I Didn't Say and More
"Hurricane" (with Ofenbach)	2021	—	—	—	—	—	—	—	—	—	— (Note: "Hurricane" did not enter the Billboard Hot 100, but peaked at number 20 on the US Billboard Dance/Mix Show Airplay Chart.)	IFPI AUT: Gold	I and Everything I Didn't Say and More
"Brave"	2022	42	—	—	—	—	89	— (Note: "Brave" did not enter the NZ Top 40 Singles Chart, but peaked at number 40 on the NZ Hot Singles Chart.)	—	—	—	BPI: Silver	Everything I Didn't Say
"Crazy What Love Can Do" (with David Guetta and Becky Hill)	2022	5	100	66	— (Note: "Crazy What Love Can Do" did not enter the Canadian Hot 100, but peaked at number 28 on the CHR/Top 40.)	26	5	— (Note: "Crazy What Love Can Do" did not enter the NZ Top 40 Singles Chart, but peaked at number eight on the NZ Hot Singles Chart.)	57	29	— (Note: "Crazy What Love Can Do" did not enter the US Billboard Hot 100 Chart, but peaked at number 12 on the Billboard Hot Dance/Electronic Songs Chart.)	BPI: 2× Platinum; ARIA: Platinum; BVMI: Gold; IFPI AUT: Platinum; IFPI SWI: 2× Platinum; MC: Platinum; RMNZ: Platinum	Only Honest on the Weekend (deluxe) and Everything I Didn't Say and More
"All for You" (with Cian Ducrot)	2022	—	—	—	—	—	—	—	—	—	—		Non-album singles
"Heartstrings" (with M-22)	2022	—	—	—	—	—	—	—	—	—	—		Non-album singles
"React" (with Switch Disco)	2023	4	—	—	—	—	4	—	—	—	— (Note: "React" did not enter the US Billboard Hot 100 Chart, but peaked at number 50 on the Billboard Hot Dance/Electronic Songs Chart.)	BPI: 2× Platinum; RMNZ: Gold	Vacancy
"No Sleep" (with Regard)	2023	—	—	—	—	—	—	—	—	—	— (Note: "No Sleep" did not enter the US Billboard Hot 100 Chart, but peaked at number 49 on the Billboard Hot Dance/Electronic Songs Chart.)		Non-album singles
"Like I Used To" (with Sonny Fodera and Paul Woolford)	2023	—	—	—	—	—	—	—	—	—	—		Non-album singles
"0800 Heaven" (with Nathan Dawe and Joel Corry)	2023	9	—	—	—	—	13	—	—	—	—	BPI: Platinum	If Heaven Had a Phone Line and Another Friday Night
"Rest of Our Days" (with Cian Ducrot)	2023	—	—	—	—	—	91	— (Note: "Rest of Our Days" did not enter the NZ Top 40 Singles Chart, but peaked at number seven on the NZ Hot Singles Chart.)	—	—	—		Non-album singles
"Alibi" (featuring Rudimental or with Natasha Bedingfield)	2024	10	—	—	—	—	20	— (Note: "Alibi" did not enter the NZ Top 40 Singles Chart, but peaked at number 14 on the NZ Hot Singles Chart.)	—	—	—	BPI: Platinum; ARIA: Gold; RMNZ: Platinum	Non-album singles
"Mamma, You Were Right"	2024	—	—	—	—	—	—	—	—	—	—		Non-album singles
"Under the Sun" (with Switch Disco and Alok)	2024	—	—	—	—	—	—	—	—	—	—		Non-album singles
"Filthy Rich"	2024	58	—	—	—	—	—	—	—	—	—		Non-album singles
"One Door Closes" (featuring Breland)	2025	—	—	—	—	—	—	—	—	—	—		Non-album singles
"Me and You"	2025	— (Note: "Me and You" did not enter the UK Singles Chart Top 100, but debuted at number 63 on the UK Singles Downloads Chart, and at number 66 on the UK Singles Sales Chart.)	—	—	—	—	—	—	—	—	—		Non-album singles
"—" denotes a recording that did not chart or was not released in that territory.

=== As featured artist ===
Title	Year	Peak chart positions										Certifications	Album
Title	Year	UK	AUS	AUT	CAN	GER	IRE	NOR	NZ	SWE	US Dance	Certifications	Album
"Glitterball" (Sigma featuring Ella Henderson)	2015	4	—	66	—	64	20	—	—	—	—	BPI: Platinum	Life
"Here for You" (Kygo featuring Ella Henderson)	2015	18	99	58	—	47	30	12	— (Note: "Here for You" did not enter the NZ Top 40 Singles Chart, but peaked at number 8 on the NZ Heatseekers chart.)	23	12	BPI: Silver; ARIA: Gold; IFPI NOR: Gold; RMNZ: Gold	Non-album singles
"Bridge over Troubled Water" (as part of Artists for Grenfell)	2017	1	53	32	—	—	25	—	— (Note: "Bridge over Troubled Water" did not enter the NZ Top 40 Singles Chart, but peaked at number four on the NZ Heatseeker Singles Chart.)	—	—	BPI: Gold	Non-album singles
"We Got Love" (Sigala featuring Ella Henderson)	2019	42	—	—	—	—	52	—	— (Note: "We Got Love" did not enter the NZ Top 40 Singles Chart, but peaked at number 32 on the NZ Hot Singles Chart.)	—	29	BPI: Gold	Everything I Didn't Say and More
"This Is Real" (Jax Jones featuring Ella Henderson)	2019	9	—	—	—	—	14	—	—	—	25	BPI: Platinum	Snacks (Supersize) and Everything I Didn't Say and More
"Hold Me Close" (Sam Feldt featuring Ella Henderson)	2020	—	—	—	—	—	—	—	—	—	30		Non-album singles
"I'm Going Through Hell" (Paige Dougall featuring Ella Henderson)	2021	—	—	—	—	—	—	—	—	—	—		Non-album singles
"21 Reasons" (Nathan Dawe featuring Ella Henderson)	2022	9	—	—	—	66	8	—	—	— (Note: "21 Reasons" did not enter the Swedish Singellista Chart, but peaked at number two on the Swedish Heatseeker Chart.)	13	BPI: Platinum; RMNZ: Gold	Everything I Didn't Say and More and If Heaven Had a Phone Line
"I Go Dancing" (Frank Walker featuring Ella Henderson)	2023	—	—	—	80	—	—	—	—	—	48	MC: Gold	Origin
"Lifeline" (Glockenbach featuring Ella Henderson)	2023	—	—	—	—	—	—	—	—	—	—		Non-album single
"Carry You Home" (Alex Warren featuring Ella Henderson)	2024	—	55	—	—	—	—	—	15	—	—	RMNZ: 3× Platinum	You'll Be Alright, Kid (Chapter 1)
"—" denotes a recording that did not chart or was not released in that territory.

=== Promotional singles ===
Title	Year	Peak chart positions	Album
Title	Year	AUT	Album
"Hard Work"	2014	73	Chapter One
"Everything I Didn't Say"	2022	—	Everything I Didn't Say
"Ugly"	2022	—	Everything I Didn't Say
"—" denotes a recording that did not chart or was not released in that territory.

== Other charted songs ==
Title	Year	Peak chart positions		Album
Title	Year	UK	AUS	Album
"Missed"	2014	151	—	Chapter One
"Empire"	2015	—	66	Chapter One
"—" denotes a recording that did not chart or was not released in that territory.

== Guest appearances ==
Title	Year	Other artist(s)	Album
"Now You Say You Love Me Again"	2016	—N/a	Despite the Falling Snow
"Handle My Own"	2021	Rudimental	Ground Control
"Christmas (Baby Please Come Home)"	2022	—N/a	Your Christmas or Mine? (Original Motion Picture Soundtrack)

== Songwriting credits ==
Title	Year	Artist(s)	Album	Credits
"Guilty"	2017	Paloma Faith	The Architect	Co-writer
"Rivers Deep"	2018	Gabby Barrett	The Fireflies EP	Co-writer
"Dobrze jest, jak jest"	2019	Roksana Węgiel	Roksana Węgiel	Co-writer
"Lighter"	2020	Nathan Dawe, KSI	Non-album singles	Co-writer, uncredited vocals
"Naughty List"	2020	Liam Payne, Dixie D'Amelio	Non-album singles	Co-writer
"Madonna"	2021	Luna	Non-album singles	Co-writer
"Follow Me"	2021	Sam Feldt, Rita Ora	Non-album singles	Co-writer
"Can't Get Enough"	2022	Sigma, Taet	Hope	Co-writer
"How Love Works"	2024	Allie Sherlock	Non-album single	Co-writer

== See also ==
For other songs by Ella Henderson, see List of songs recorded by Ella Henderson.
