= Glorious =

Glorious may refer to:

== Music ==
- Glorious (music group), a French Christian rock and worship band

=== Albums ===
- Glorious (Arty album) or the title song, 2015
- Glorious (Bonfire album), 2015
- Glorious (Foxes album) or the title song (see below), 2014
- Glorious (Gloria Gaynor album), 1977
- Glorious: The Singles 97–07, by Natalie Imbruglia, or the title song (see below), 2007
- Glorious (EP), by Ella Henderson, or the title song (see below), 2019
- Glorious (Kate Hudson album), 2024
- Glorious (GloRilla album), 2024

=== Songs ===
- "Glorious" (Andreas Johnson song), 1999
- "Glorious" (Cascada song), 2013
- "Glorious" (Foxes song), 2014
- "Glorious" (Ella Henderson song), 2019
- "Glorious" (Macklemore song), 2017
- "Glorious" (Måns Zelmerlöw song), 2016
- "Glorious" (Natalie Imbruglia song), 2007
- "Glorious" (The Pierces song), 2011
- "Glorious", by Adorable from Against Perfection, 1993
- "Glorious", by David Archuleta, theme song from the documentary film Meet the Mormons, 2014; originally by Stephanie Mabey, 2012
- "Glorious", by Everclear from Welcome to the Drama Club, 2006
- "Glorious", by James Morrison from You're Stronger Than You Know, 2019
- "Glorious", by Muse from Black Holes and Revelations, 2006
- "Glorious", by Tkay Maidza, 2017
- "Glorious 1" by Remy Zero from The Golden Hum, 2001

== Other uses ==
- Glorious (Eddie Izzard), a 1997 stand-up comedy performance video by Eddie Izzard
- Glorious! (stage comedy), a 2005 play by Peter Quilter
- Glorious (film), a 2022 comedy horror film starring J.K. Simmons
- Glorious-class aircraft carrier or Courageous-class, a Royal Navy group of three ships 1925—1945
  - HMS Glorious, a battlecruiser converted to aircraft carrier

== See also ==
- Glorioso (disambiguation)
- Glory (disambiguation)
