= Little Dreaming =

Studio album by Cian Ducrot
- Released: 1 August 2025
- Length: 52:51
- Label: Polydor
- Producer: Will Bloomfield; Cian Ducrot; Anton Göransson; Jamie Hartman; Alex Hope; Lostboy; Nick Monson; Mark Nilan Jr.; Noah Nockels; Tristan Salvati

Cian Ducrot chronology
Victory (2023)	Little Dreaming (2025)

Singles from Little Dreaming
- 1. "Who's Making You Feel It" Released: 17 January 2025; 2. "Little Dreaming" Released: 14 March 2025; 3. "Shalalala" Released: 31 May 2025; 4. "Your Eyes" Released: 18 July 2025

Little Dreaming is the second studio album by Irish singer Cian Ducrot. It was announced in March 2025, alongside its title track, and was released on 1 August 2025 through Polydor.

The release date was initially slated for 11 July but was later moved to 1 August.

== Track listing ==
Little Dreaming digital track listing
No.	Title	Writer(s)	Producer(s)	Length
1.	"It's Cian Bitch"	Cian Ducrot; Will Bloomfield; Theo Hutchcraft; Bill Maybury	Ducrot^{[p]}; Anton Göransson^{[p]}; Bloomfield	1:11
2.	"Who's Making You Feel It"	Ducrot; Theo Hutchcraft; Lostboy	Lostboy	3:36
3.	"Little Dreaming"	Ducrot; Bloomfield; Hutchcraft; Maybury	Ducrot; Göransson; Bloomfield	3:23
4.	"Unfair"	Ducrot; Nick Monson; Mark Nilan Jr.	Monson; Nilan	3:34
5.	"What About Love"	Ducrot; Göransson; Isabella Sjöstrand	Ducrot^{[p]}; Göransson^{[p]}; Sjöstrand^{[v]}	3:37
6.	"Shalalala"	Ducrot; Göransson; Hutchcraft; Maybury; Sjöstrand	Ducrot^{[p]}; Göransson^{[p]}; Sjöstrand^{[v]}	4:06
7.	"Rock Bottom"	Ducrot; Hank Compton; Jamie McLaughlin; Rudey	Ducrot; Noah Nockels	3:31
8.	"Kiss and Tell"	Ducrot; Bloomfield; Maybury	Ducrot^{[p]}; Göransson^{[p]}; Bloomfield	2:29
9.	"The Book of Love"	Ducrot; Göransson; Ben Kohn; Sjöstrand	Ducrot^{[p]}; Göransson^{[p]}	4:23
10.	"Hallelujah"	Ducrot; Kohn; Phil Plested; Tristan Salvati	Ducrot; Göransson; Salvati	3:24
11.	"Break My Heart"	Ducrot; Salvati	Ducrot; Göransson; Salvati	3:37
12.	"No Way to Live"	Ducrot; Alex Hope; Andrew Jackson	Ducrot; Hope	3:07
13.	"God Only Knows"	Ducrot; Jamie Hartman	Ducrot; Hartman; Göransson^{[a]}	3:25
14.	"My Best Friend"	Ducrot	Ducrot; Göransson	3:31
15.	"Your Eyes"	Ducrot; Göransson; Maybury; Sjöstrand	Ducrot^{[p]}; Göransson^{[p]}	3:01
16.	"See It to Believe It" (featuring Grace Bowers)	Ducrot; Göransson; Hutchcraft; Maybury; Sjöstrand	Ducrot^{[p]}; Göransson^{[p]}; Elijah Ford^{[a]}; Sjöstrand^{[v]}	2:47
Total length:				52:51

=== Notes ===
- ^{^[p]} signifies a primary and vocal producer.
- ^{^[a]} signifies an additional producer.
- ^{^[v]} signifies a vocal producer.

== Personnel ==
Credits adapted from Tidal.

=== Musicians ===
- Cian Ducrot – vocals (all tracks), background vocals (tracks 1–3, 5–7, 9–11, 13, 15, 16), guitar (1, 3–12, 15, 16), programming (1, 5–10, 13, 16), piano (2, 5, 9, 10, 12), keyboards (3, 6, 15, 16), acoustic guitar (4, 7, 8, 12–14), drums (6, 9, 10), electric guitar (7, 12), drum programming (7), flute (8, 12), tin whistle (8), bass (10, 11); accordion, fiddle, ganga, violin (12)
- Anton Göransson – programming (1, 3, 5, 6, 8–10, 13–16), drums (1, 3, 5, 6, 9–11, 15, 16), guitar (1, 3, 5, 8–11, 15, 16), bass (3, 5, 6, 9–11, 15, 16), background vocals (3, 6, 11, 15, 16), synthesizer (3), electric guitar (8, 16), keyboards (15, 16)
- Will Bloomfield – programming (1, 3, 8), guitar (1, 8); bass, drums (1); background vocals, synthesizer (3)
- Isabella Sjöstrand – background vocals (1, 6, 10, 15, 16)
- Theo Hutchcraft – background vocals (2, 3, 6, 16), guitar (6)
- Peter Rycroft – bass programming, drum programming, keyboards (2)
- Bill Maybury – background vocals (3, 6, 15, 16)
- Nick Monson – acoustic guitar, bass (4)
- Mark Nilan Jr. – keyboards (4)
- Noah Nockels – bass, keyboards, organ (7)
- Hank Compton – acoustic guitar (7)
- Jamie McLaughlin – acoustic guitar (7)
- Tristan Salvati – bass (10, 11), programming (10); background vocals, guitar, mandolin (11)
- Alex Hope – bass, ganga, programming (12)
- Andrew Jackson – ganga (12)
- Jamie Hartman – programming (13)
- Grace Bowers – electric guitar, vocals (16)

=== Technical ===
- Josh Gudwin – mixing (1–3, 5, 6, 8–11, 13–16)
- Liam Hicks – mixing (4, 7, 12)
- Cian Ducrot – mixing (4), engineering (9)
- Idania Valencia – mastering
- Anton Göransson – engineering (1, 5, 6, 8, 9, 15, 16)
- Robert Sellens – engineering (1, 5, 6, 8, 9, 15, 16)
- Will Bloomfield – engineering (1, 8)
- Isabella Sjöstrand – engineering (1)
- Connor Davison – engineering (16)
- Logan Hanna – engineering (16)

== Charts ==
Chart performance for Little Dreaming
Chart (2025)	Peak position
Irish Albums (OCC)	1
Scottish Albums (OCC)	4
UK Albums (OCC)	31
