= Hate You + Love You =

2021 song by Cheat Codes featuring AJ Mitchell

Single by Cheat Codes featuring AJ Mitchell

from the album Hellraisers, Pt. 1
- Released: February 5, 2021
- Length: 3:18
- Label: Epic
- Songwriter(s): AJ Mitchell; Bryn Christopher; Henrik Michelsen; Kevin Pederson; Koda; Matthew Elifritz; Trevor Dahl
- Producer(s): Henrik Michelsen; Trevor Dahl

Cheat Codes singles chronology
"No Chill" (2021)	"Hate You + Love You" (2021)	"That Feeling" (2021)

AJ Mitchell singles chronology
"Blame It on the Mistletoe" (2020)	"Hate You + Love You" (2021)	"Cameras On" (2021)

"Hate You + Love You" is a song by American DJ trio Cheat Codes featuring American singer-songwriter AJ Mitchell, released through Epic Records on February 5, 2021, as the eighth single from their debut studio album Hellraisers, Pt. 1 (2021).

== Background and content ==
Cheat Codes explained in a statement: "We've all had that experience with a friend, family member, girlfriend or boyfriend where you just have that feeling: I hate you but I love you at the same time. AJ Mitchell captures that every and we were so stoked to have him jump on this with us."

== Credits and personnel ==
Credits adapted from Tidal.

- Henrik Michelsen – producer, composer, lyricist, programmer
- AJ Mitchell – composer, lyricist, associated performer
- Trevor Dahl – producer, composer, lyricist, associated performer
- Bryn Christopher – composer, lyricist
- Kevin Pederson – lyricist
- Koda – lyricist
- Matthew Elifritz – lyricist
- Sage Skolfield – assistant engineer
- Sean Solymar – assistant engineer
- Mike Dean – mastering engineer, mixing engineer

== Charts ==
=== Weekly charts ===
Weekly chart performance for "Hate You + Love You"
Chart (2021)	Peak position
US Hot Dance/Electronic Songs (Billboard)	11

=== Year-end charts ===
Year-end chart performance for "Hate You + Love You"
Chart (2021)	Position
US Hot Dance/Electronic Songs (Billboard)	22

== Release history ==
Release history for "Hate You + Love You"
Region	Date	Format	Label	Ref.
Various	February 5, 2021	Digital download; streaming	Epic	
