= I'll Be Waiting (Cian Ducrot song) =

Single by Cian Ducrot

from the album Victory
- Released: 10 November 2022
- Length: 2:52
- Label: Polydor / Universal
- Songwriters: Cian Ducrot; Lauren Frawley
- Producers: Cian Ducrot; Joseph Wander

Cian Ducrot singles chronology
"All for You" (2022)	"I'll Be Waiting" (2022)	"Part of Me" (2023)

"I'll Be Waiting" is a song by Irish singer and songwriter Cian Ducrot. It was released on 10 November 2022 as the second single from his debut studio album, Victory (2023). The song peaked at number 6 on the Irish Singles Chart and several international charts.

About the single, Ducrot said "It's a story of waiting for someone you love to show up, but they tend to not show up when you need them."

== Track listing ==
"I'll Be Waiting"
No.	Title	Length
1.	"I'll Be Waiting"	2:52

"I'll Be Waiting" (Choir version)
No.	Title	Length
1.	"I'll Be Waiting" (Choir version)	2:56

"I'll Be Waiting" (Acoustic version)
No.	Title	Length
1.	"I'll Be Waiting" (Acoustic version)	2:55

== Charts ==
Weekly chart performance for "I'll Be Waiting"
Chart (2023)	Peak position
Belgium (Ultratop 50 Flanders)	7
Belgium (Ultratop 50 Wallonia)	25
Czech Republic Airplay (ČNS IFPI)	18
Denmark (Tracklisten)	20
Ireland (IRMA)	6
Netherlands (Dutch Top 40)	5
Netherlands (Single Top 100)	17
Norway (VG-lista)	17
Sweden (Sverigetopplistan)	38
Switzerland (Schweizer Hitparade)	56
UK Singles (OCC)	16

== Certifications ==
Certifications for "I'll Be Waiting"
Region	Certification	Certified units/sales
Australia (ARIA)	Gold	35,000^{‡}
Belgium (BRMA)	Gold	20,000^{‡}
Canada (Music Canada)	Gold	40,000^{‡}
Denmark (IFPI Danmark)	Gold	45,000^{‡}
Netherlands (NVPI)	Gold	40,000^{‡}
New Zealand (RMNZ)	Gold	15,000^{‡}
Norway (IFPI Norway)	Gold	30,000^{‡}
United Kingdom (BPI)	Platinum	600,000^{‡}
^{‡} Sales+streaming figures based on certification alone.
