= ID (song) =

Single by Kygo
- Released: 10 February 2015
- Recorded: 2014–2015
- Genre: Tropical house; deep house
- Length: 4:49
- Label: Ultra; Sony
- Songwriter: Kyrre Gørvell-Dahll
- Producer: Kygo

Kygo singles chronology
"Firestone" (2014)	"ID" (2015)	"Stole the Show" (2015)

Audio video
- "ID" on YouTube

"ID" (alternatively "ID (Ultra Music Festival Anthem)") is a song by Norwegian DJ and record producer Kygo. The song was released on 10 February 2015 and reached number 31 on the Norwegian Singles Chart. "ID" was also included on the FIFA 16 soundtrack. It was the official anthem of the 2015 Ultra Music Festival.

Kygo was asked to create the official anthem of the 2015 Ultra Music Festival. A song was used in their trailer for the Miami festival, which took place in March. The track is simply titled "ID" because it does not officially have a name.

The vocal version of this song is called "Here for You", and features the vocals from British singer and songwriter Ella Henderson, which was released on 4 September 2015.

The instrumental tune follows the style of his highly successful predecessor "Firestone", combining soft melodies with the essence of tropical house.

== Critical reception ==
Theo Maulen of EDM Assassin said; "It has a beautiful beat, mellow and relaxing, and gives a nice chill feel. Kygo doesn't break from his tropical house style and gets listeners ready for the 'paradise' that will be Miami next month."

== Charts ==
=== Weekly charts ===
Chart (2015)	Peak position
Hungary (Stream Top 40)	28
Netherlands (Single Top 100)	83
Norway (VG-lista)	31
Sweden (Sverigetopplistan)	76
US Hot Dance/Electronic Songs (Billboard)	32
