= Alibi (Ella Henderson song) =

Single by Ella Henderson featuring Rudimental

from the album You Ain't Got No Alibi
- Released: 12 January 2024
- Length: 3:04
- Label: A Major Toms; Asylum
- Songwriters: Maegan Cottone; Ella Henderson; Olivia Sebastianelli; Ruth-Anne Cunningham; William Lansley; John Morgan; Artis Ivy Jr.; Doug Rasheed; Larry Sanders; Stevie Wonder
- Producers: Punctual; Rudimental

Ella Henderson singles chronology
| "Rest of Our Days" (2023) | "Alibi" (2024) | "Mamma, You Were Right" (2024) |

Rudimental singles chronology
| "Thunderstorm" (2023) | "Alibi" (2024) | "Waterslides" (2024) |

Natasha Bedingfield singles chronology
| "Adorable" (2021) | "Alibi" (2024) |

Music video
- "Alibi" on YouTube

"Alibi" is a song by British singer Ella Henderson featuring British drum and bass band Rudimental and taken from her EP You Ain't Got No Alibi. It was released on 12 January 2024 through A Major Toms and Asylum Records. "Alibi" samples Coolio's 1995 single "Gangsta's Paradise", which in turn samples Stevie Wonder's 1976 song "Pastime Paradise". "Alibi" peaked at number ten on the UK Singles Chart. The song was included on the deluxe edition of Rudimental’s fifth studio Rudim3ntal.

In April 2024, a version featuring Natasha Bedingfield was released.

== Track listing ==
- Digital download
1. "Alibi" – 3:04
- Digital download
1. "Alibi" (Live acoustic version) – 3:30
- Digital download
1. "Alibi" (Shapes VIP remix) – 3:02
- Digital download
1. "Alibi" (Joel Corry remix) – 2:22
- Digital download
1. "Alibi" (TRIBBS remix) – 2:46
- Digital download (the remixes)
1. "Alibi" (Slowed) – 3:42
2. "Alibi" (Sped Up) – 2:42
3. "Alibi" (Extended) – 4:30
4. "Alibi" (Instrumental) – 3:04
5. "Alibi" (Acapella) – 2:53
- Digital download
1. "Alibi" (The Other Girl version - with Natasha Bedingfield) – 3:04
- Digital download
1. "Alibi" (Henri PFR remix) – 2:22

== Charts ==
=== Weekly charts ===
Weekly chart performance for "Alibi"
| Chart (2024) | Peak position |
|---|---|
| Australia (ARIA) | 98 |
| Belarus Airplay (TopHit) | 3 |
| Belgium (Ultratop 50 Wallonia) | 43 |
| CIS Airplay (TopHit) | 7 |
| Czech Republic Airplay (ČNS IFPI) | 1 |
| Czech Republic Singles Digital (ČNS IFPI) | 65 |
| Estonia Airplay (TopHit) | 1 |
| France (SNEP) | 109 |
| Ireland (IRMA) | 20 |
| Kazakhstan Airplay (TopHit) | 17 |
| Latvia Airplay (LAIPA) | 16 |
| Lebanon Airplay (Lebanese Top 20) | 3 |
| Lithuania Airplay (TopHit) | 4 |
| Moldova Airplay (TopHit) | 86 |
| Poland (Polish Airplay Top 100) | 27 |
| Romania Airplay (TopHit) | 100 |
| Russia Airplay (TopHit) | 11 |
| Slovakia Airplay (ČNS IFPI) | 1 |
| Slovakia Singles Digital (ČNS IFPI) | 60 |
| Turkey International Airplay (Radiomonitor Türkiye) | 1 |
| Ukraine Airplay (TopHit) | 4 |
| UK Singles (Official Charts) | 10 |
| UK Dance (Official Charts) | 2 |

=== Monthly charts ===
Monthly chart performance for "Alibi"
| Chart (2024) | Peak position |
|---|---|
| Belarus Airplay (TopHit) | 4 |
| CIS Airplay (TopHit) | 9 |
| Czech Republic (Rádio – Top 100) | 1 |
| Czech Republic (Singles Digitál Top 100) | 69 |
| Estonia Airplay (TopHit) | 4 |
| Kazakhstan Airplay (TopHit) | 23 |
| Latvia Airplay (TopHit) | 71 |
| Lithuania Airplay (TopHit) | 2 |
| Russia Airplay (TopHit) | 15 |
| Slovakia (Rádio – Top 100) | 1 |
| Slovakia (Singles Digitál Top 100) | 49 |
| Ukraine Airplay (TopHit) | 8 |

=== Year-end charts ===
Year-end chart performance for "Alibi"
| Chart (2024) | Position |
|---|---|
| Belarus Airplay (TopHit) | 17 |
| CIS Airplay (TopHit) | 21 |
| Estonia Airplay (TopHit) | 13 |
| Russia Airplay (TopHit) | 40 |
| UK Singles (OCC) | 35 |

2025 year-end chart performance for "Alibi"
| Chart (2025) | Position |
|---|---|
| Belarus Airplay (TopHit) | 36 |
| CIS Airplay (TopHit) | 160 |

== Certifications ==
Certifications for "Alibi"
| Region | Certification | Certified units/sales |
|---|---|---|
| Australia (ARIA) | Gold | 35,000^{‡} |
| Belgium (BRMA) | Gold | 20,000^{‡} |
| New Zealand (RMNZ) | Platinum | 30,000^{‡} |
| Poland (ZPAV) | Gold | 25,000^{‡} |
| United Kingdom (BPI) | Platinum | 600,000^{‡} |
^{‡} Sales+streaming figures based on certification alone.
