= Victory (Cian Ducrot album) =

Studio album by Cian Ducrot
- Released: 4 August 2023
- Recorded: 2022
- Length: 46:53
- Label: Polydor
- Producer: Rory Andrew; Nick Atkinson; Cian Ducrot; Edd Holloway; Steve Mac; Jacob Manson; Ryan Marrone; Tristan Salvati; Joseph Wander

Cian Ducrot chronology
Make Believe (2021)	Victory (2023)	Little Dreaming (2025)

Singles from Victory
- 1. "All for You" Released: 7 April 2022; 2. "I'll Be Waiting" Released: 10 November 2022; 3. "Part of Me" Released: 31 March 2023; 4. "Heaven" Released: 2 June 2023; 5. "Everyone Who Falls in Love (Has Someone Else They're Thinking Of)" Released: 21 July 2023

Victory is the debut studio album by Irish singer Cian Ducrot. It was released on 4 August 2023 through Polydor. The album was preceded by five singles: "All for You", "I'll Be Waiting", "Part of Me", "Heaven", "Everyone Who Falls in Love (Has Someone Else They're Thinking Of)".

== Background and singles ==
The album was recorded in Paris in 2022. Ducrot himself chose the place due to his mother's deep connection with the city. Ducrot first released the self-written and self-produced lead single "All for You" in April 2022. The song quickly gained viral attention and prompted a duet version with Ella Henderson, released in August 2022. The second single "I'll Be Waiting" achieved similar commercial success. On June 2, he released the single "Heaven" which reflects on the relationship with his brother.

Ducrot announced the album on 13 April 2023. In an accompanying Instagram post, Ducrot wrote: "This album represents that victory, the victory of self-belief, the victory of everyone around me who I love and who loved me back, the story of my brother, of my mother, of my grandparents, of my friends, and everyone who fought by our side every step of the way."

The release date was initially slated for 21 July but was later moved to 4 August.

== Critical reception ==
In a positive review, Lauren Murphy of The Irish Times opined that Ducrot "sets his stall firmly in the former camp" (referring to songwriters who 'wear their heart on their sleeve') with his debut album. Murphy called the record "impressively accomplished" and predicted ensuing "international success" for the artist. Jen Long at Line of Best Fit described the album as a "culmination of everything he's worked towards and everything he's been through" with most of the songs stemming from "personal experiences". Long praised his "tender and diaristic" lyrics and vocals which "are placed at the forefront of the songs".

== Commercial performance ==
Victory debuted at number-one on the UK Albums Chart, with combined sales of 15,668 units.

== Track listing ==
Victory track listing
No.	Title	Writer(s)	Producer(s)	Length
1.	"Victory"	Cian Ducrot; Tristan Salvati	Ducrot; Salvati^{[p]}	3:11
2.	"I'll Be Waiting"	Ducrot; Lauren Frawley	Ducrot; Joseph Wander	2:52
3.	"Him"	Ducrot; Salvati	Ducrot; Salvati^{[p]}	2:54
4.	"Heaven"	Ducrot; Steve Mac	Mac	3:52
5.	"How Do You Know"	Ducrot; Andrew	Andrew^{[p]}; Ducrot^{[a]}	4:00
6.	"All for You"	Ducrot	Ducrot	3:41
7.	"Step Dad"	Ducrot; Salvati	Ducrot; Salvati	3:19
8.	"Mama"	Ducrot; Salvati	Ducrot; Salvati^{[p]}	2:51
9.	"Hurt When You Hurt Me"	Ducrot; Bill Maybury	Ducrot; Salvati	4:01
10.	"Blame It on You"	Ducrot; Nick Atkinson; Edd Holloway	Holloway; Atkinson	3:52
11.	"Endless Nights"	Ducrot; Salvati	Ducrot; Salvati^{[p]}	3:11
12.	"Part of Me"	Ducrot; Atkinson; Holloway	Ducrot; Salvati^{[p]}	3:22
13.	"Everyone Who Falls in Love (Has Someone Else They're Thinking Of)"	Ducrot; Maybury	Ducrot; Jacob Manson	2:36
14.	"Thank God You Stayed"	Ducrot; Sam Fischer; Ryan Marrone	Marrone	3:04
Total length:				46:53

Victory (with Strings and Choir) track listing
No.	Title	Writer(s)	Producer(s)	Length
15.	"Everyone Who Falls in Love (Has Someone Else They're Thinking Of)" (Choir version)	Ducrot; Maybury	Ducrot; Manson; Jonathan Quarmby^{[a]}	2:365
16.	"Thank God You Stayed" (Choir version)	Ducrot; Fischer; Marrone	Marrone; Quarmby^{[a]}	2:56
17.	"I'll Be Waiting" (Choir version)	Ducrot; Frawley	Ducrot; Wander	2:56
18.	"Victory" (Choir version)	Ducrot; Salvati	Ducrot; Salvati^{[p]}; Quarmby^{[a]}	3:00
19.	"Mama" (Strings version)	Ducrot; Salvati	Ducrot; Salvati^{[p]}; Quarmby^{[a]}	2:52
20.	"How Do You Know" (Strings version)	Ducrot; Andrew	Andrew^{[p]}; Ducrot^{[a]}; Quarmby^{[a]}	3:48
21.	"Him" (Strings version)	Ducrot; Salvati	Ducrot; Salvati; Quarmby^{[a]}	2:50
22.	"Part of Me" (Strings version)	Ducrot; Atkinson; Holloway	Ducrot; Salvati; Quarmby^{[a]}	3:26

=== Notes ===
- ^{^[p]} signifies a primary and vocal producer
- ^{^[a]} signifies an additional producer

== Personnel ==
Credits adapted from the album's liner notes and Tidal.

=== Musicians ===
- Cian Ducrot – vocals (all tracks), piano (tracks 1–3, 6, 7, 11, 12, 17, 18, 21), choir (1, 3, 7, 8, 11, 12, 18, 19, 21), keyboards (1, 7, 8, 18, 19), programming (1, 11, 12, 18), drum programming (1, 18), guitar (2, 3, 8, 11, 17, 19, 21), bass (2, 3, 11, 17, 21), background vocals (2, 17), flute (3, 11, 21)
- Tristan Salvati – drum programming, programming (1, 3, 8, 11, 12, 18, 19, 21); additional keyboards (1, 18), keyboards (3, 8, 19, 21), piano (8, 19)
- Joseph Wander – background vocals, programming (2, 17); bass, synthesizer, percussion, guitar (2); keyboards (17)
- Ari Olafsson – background vocals (2)
- Erica Manzoli – background vocals (2)
- Steve Mac – keyboards (4)
- Chris Laws – drum programming (4)
- John Parricelli – guitars (4)
- Emily Holligan – background vocals (4)
- Margorette Muzangaza – background vocals (4)
- Rory Andrew – string arrangement (5, 20)
- Innes Yellowlees – piano (6)
- Edd Holloway – bass, piano, synthesizer (10, 22)
- Jacob Manson – bass, drums, guitar, keyboards, programming (13, 15)
- Ryan Marrone – drum programming, guitar, strings, synthesizer (14, 16)
- Sam Fischer – background vocals (14, 16)
- Wayne Ellington – vocals (17)
- RNCM Student Choir – choir (17)

=== Technical and visuals ===
- Geoff Swan – mixing (1, 8, 11, 13)
- Mark "Spike" Stent – mixing (2)
- Josh Gudwin – mixing (3, 7, 12)
- Dan Grech – mixing (4)
- Dean Reid – mixing (5, 9, 10, 14)
- Yianni Anastos-Prastacos – mixing (6)
- Jonathan Quarmby – mixing (15, 16, 18–22)
- Joseph Wander – mixing (17), engineering (2)
- Idania Valencia – mastering (1, 3–5, 7–15, 21)
- Oli Morgan – mastering (2)
- Randy Merrill – mastering (6)
- John Davis – mastering (16, 18, 21)
- Jeremy Cooper – mastering (17)
- Mark Ralph – engineering (2)
- Tristan Salvati – engineering (3, 7, 8, 11, 12, 18, 19)
- Dann Pursey – engineering (4)
- Chris Laws – engineering (4)
- Rory Andrew – engineering (5, 20)
- Cian Ducrot – engineering (6, 18)
- Edd Holloway – engineering (10)
- Jacob Manson – engineering (13, 15)
- Ryan Marrone – engineering (14, 16)
- Gary Hadfield – engineering (17)
- Holly Whittaker – photography

== Charts ==
Chart performance for Victory
Chart (2023)	Peak position
Belgian Albums (Ultratop Flanders)	10
Belgian Albums (Ultratop Wallonia)	117
Dutch Albums (Album Top 100)	3
French Albums (SNEP)	88
German Albums (Offizielle Top 100)	48
Irish Albums (OCC)	1
Scottish Albums (OCC)	1
Swiss Albums (Schweizer Hitparade)	22
UK Albums (OCC)	1
