= Glorioso =

Glorioso may refer to:

- Glorioso Islands, French islands in the Indian Ocean
- Glorioso, an 18th-century Spanish ship of the line (see Voyage of the Glorioso)
- Richard Glorioso (born 1943), retired United States Air Force colonel and Republican politician
- O Glorioso ("The Glorious One"), nickname of Brazilian football club Botafogo de Futebol e Regatas
- O Glorioso ("The Glorious One"), nickname of Portuguese sports club S.L. Benfica
- El Glorioso, nickname of the Tigres del Licey Dominican baseball team

== See also ==
- Glorious (disambiguation)
