= Cian Ducrot =

Irish singer

Cian Brendan Ducrot
- Born: 30 August 1997 (age 29); Ireland
- Genre: Indie pop
- Occupation: Singer-songwriter
- Years active: 2020–present
- Labels: Darkroom/Interscope (2021–present); Polydor (2022–present)
- Website: www.cianducrot.com

Cian Brendan Ducrot (born 30 August 1997) is a Grammy Award-winning Irish-French singer-songwriter and producer. He rose to prominence with his single "All for You", which gained popularity in 2022 via TikTok and peaked at number 2 on the Irish Singles Chart and number 19 on the UK Singles Chart. His following single, "I'll Be Waiting", peaked at number 6 in Ireland and number 14 in the UK.

== Early life ==
Ducrot grew up in Passage West in Cork, Ireland, where his mother was a concert pianist and flautist. Ducrot joined musicals and drama clubs during his school years. His mother is French and his father is Irish.

He won a scholarship to Wells Cathedral School, a specialist music school in the county of Somerset. Ducrot was accepted to study at the Royal Academy of Music in London on a full scholarship where he studied classical flute.

In 2016, Ducrot auditioned for the fifth season of The Voice UK, but did not turn a chair singing "One More Night".

== Career ==
=== 2018–2020: Royal Academy of Music and Started in College ===
A couple of years into his schooling in London, Ducrot took a trip to Los Angeles, that inspired him to pursue his dream of becoming a pop artist instead of a classical flautist. He left school and moved back to Ireland to pursue his dream. With money being tight, he would often couch surf between London and Los Angeles. The product of these experiences was his debut release mixtape, Started in College, which was released in June 2020.

Ducrot said, "I started learning how to produce in school. It was in college that I started taking music seriously and that's when I found out how I could release music and how I could put my music out there and really work to the point where my production and my writing was at a place where I was happy enough with it to put them out. And so that's what started in college was for me... It really embodies what happened to me during those two years, like, all of the different things from falling in love to falling out of love."

Following its release, Ducrot was signed by Darkroom/Interscope Records.

=== 2021: Make Believe ===
In February 2021, Ducrot released his debut single, "Not Usually Like This". This was followed by "Crocodiles" in March 2021, which he says is about "losing a friend and being both angry and hurt about it".

In May 2021, Ducrot released "Know Me Again" featuring Canadian artist Cate. This was followed by "Chewing Gum" in August, "Make Believe" in September "Hello Gorgeous", which is an ode to resilient Women in November and "Happier Without Me" in December 2021.

On 9 December 2021, Ducrot released his debut extended play, Make Believe, which included all the singles released throughout the year. Speaking about the EP, Ducrot said "Making this EP was a very strange but amazing process for me as half of the songs were written before I even knew I was making an EP. It's been years in the making and pulls from so many moments in my life. I have loved discovering new directions and new music and also rediscovering old songs and bringing them to life and, most of all, discovering myself and what matters to me. Most of the EP was made throughout lockdown and the pandemic so it was a lot of days and nights alone and of course on the other side of the planet away from my team at Darkroom & Interscope."

=== 2022–2024: Victory ===
In April 2022, Ducrot released "All for You", which became his first charting single, peaking at number 2 in Ireland and number 19 in the United Kingdom. A version featuring Ella Henderson was released in August 2022.

In November 2022, Ducrot released "I'll Be Waiting", which began climbing national charts in early 2023.

In December 2022, Ducrot released a cover of "Hallelujah". In a live video of the song, the musician is joined by the Royal Northern College of Music Student Choir.

In March 2023, Ducrot was announced as the support act for Ed Sheeran on his 4 date UK tour, ahead of Sheeran's upcoming album − ("Subtract"). He released "Part of Me" later that month, which was a tribute to his best friend who ended his life. Ducrot's debut studio album Victory was released on 4 August 2023 and reached number one in Ireland. The album also reached number one in the United Kingdom, selling 10,299 in its first week.

=== 2025: Little Dreaming ===
In February 2025, Ducrot won the Grammy Award for Best R&B Song at the 67th Annual Grammy Awards for co-writing SZA's song "Saturn".

Ducrot's second studio album Little Dreaming was released on 1 August 2025.

== Discography ==
=== Albums ===
List of studio albums, with selected details
Title	Details	Peak chart positions			
Title	Details	IRE	GER	SWI	UK
Victory	Released: 4 August 2023; Format: Digital download, CD, vinyl, cassette, streaming; Label: Polydor	1	48	22	1
Little Dreaming	Released: 1 August 2025; Format: Digital download, CD, vinyl, cassette, streaming; Label: Polydor	1	—	—	31

=== Extended plays ===
List of EPs, with selected details
Title	Details
Make Believe	Released: 9 December 2021; Format: Digital download, Streaming; Label: Darkroom, Interscope

=== Mixtapes ===
List of mixtapes, with selected details
Title	Details
Started in College	Released: 10 July 2020; Format: Digital download, Streaming; Label: Cian Ducrot

=== Singles ===
List of singles, with selected chart positions
Title	Year	Peak chart positions								Certifications	Album
Title	Year	IRE	BEL (FL)	DEN	NLD	NOR	SWE	SWI	UK	Certifications	Album
"Not Usually Like This"	2021	—	—	—	—	—	—	—	—		Make Believe
"Crocodiles"	2021	—	—	—	—	—	—	—	—		Make Believe
"Know Me Again" (featuring Cate)	2021	—	—	—	—	—	—	—	—		Make Believe
"Chewing Gum"	2021	—	—	—	—	—	—	—	—		Make Believe
"Make Believe"	2021	—	—	—	—	—	—	—	—		Make Believe
"Hello Gorgeous"	2021	—	—	—	—	—	—	—	—		Make Believe
"Happier Without Me"	2021	—	—	—	—	—	—	—	—		Make Believe
"All for You" (solo or with Ella Henderson)	2022	2	—	—	—	—	—	—	19	BPI: Platinum	Victory
"I'll Be Waiting"	2022	6	7	20	17	17	38	56	16	ARIA: Gold; BEA: Gold; BPI: Platinum; IFPI DEN: Gold; IFPI NOR: Gold; NVPI: Gold	Victory
"Part of Me"	2023	28	—	—	—	—	—	—	87		Victory
"Heaven"	2023	53	15	—	— (Note: "Heaven" did not enter the Dutch Single Top 100, but peaked at number 29 on the Single Tip chart.)	—	—	—	—		Victory
"Everyone Who Falls in Love (Has Someone Else They're Thinking Of)"	2023	78	—	—	—	—	—	—	—		Victory
"Rest of Our Days" (with Ella Henderson)	2023	91	—	—	—	—	—	—	—		Non-album singles
"Here It Is"	2024	—	—	—	—	—	—	—	—		Non-album singles
"Something I Can't Afford"	2024	—	—	—	—	—	—	—	—		Non-album singles
"Can't Even Hate You"	2024	—	—	—	—	—	—	—	—		Non-album singles
"Who's Making You Feel It"	2025	—	—	—	—	—	—	—	—		Little Dreaming
"Little Dreaming"	2025	95	—	—	—	—	—	—	—		Little Dreaming
"Shalalala"	2025	—	—	—	—	—	—	—	—		Little Dreaming
"Your Eyes"	2025	—	—	—	—	—	—	—	—		Little Dreaming
"—" denotes a recording that did not chart or was not released in that territory.

== Tours ==
Headlining

- The Dream Ship Tour (2025)

Supporting

- Ella Henderson - Everything I Didn't Say Tour (2022)
- Ed Sheeran - - Tour (2023)
- Victory Stripped Intimate Album Shows (2023)
- Teddy Swims - I've Tried Everything But Therapy Tour (2025)
