= All for You (Cian Ducrot song) =

Single by Cian Ducrot

from the album Victory
- Released: 7 April 2022
- Length: 3:41
- Label: Polydor / Universal
- Songwriter: Cian Ducrot
- Producer: Cian Ducrot

Cian Ducrot singles chronology
"Happier Without Me" (2021)	"All for You" (2022)	"I'll Be Waiting" (2022)

Music video
- "All for You" on YouTube

"All for You" is a song by Irish singer and songwriter Cian Ducrot. It was released on 7 April 2022 as the lead single from his debut studio album, Victory (2023). The song peaked at number 2 on the Irish Singles Chart and 19 on the UK Singles Chart where it was certified platinum in October 2023.

In speaking about the song, Ducrot said "In total this song probably took the best part of a week to write and to get right. I wrote most of it on the piano in my living room but also a lot was written in my head as I went about my daily routine. I was trying to get every lyric and melody right."

A duet version was released in August 2022 with Ella Henderson and a French version was released in January 2023.

== Track listing ==
"All for You"
No.	Title	Length
1.	"All for You"	3:41

"All for You" (remixes)
No.	Title	Length
1.	"All for You"	3:39
2.	"All for You" (acoustic)	3:40
3.	"All for You" (remix)	2:38
4.	"All for You" (In the Bathroom At a Party)	3:41
5.	"All for You" (Slow + Reverbed)	3:48

"All for You" (with Ella Henderson)
No.	Title	Length
1.	"All for You" (with Ella Henderson)	3:41

"Moi qui t'aimais Tellement" ("All for You")
No.	Title	Length
1.	"Moi qui t'aimais Tellement"	3:40

== Charts ==
Weekly chart performance for "All for You"
Chart (2022–2023)	Peak position
Ireland (IRMA)	2
UK Singles (Official Charts)	19

== Certifications ==
Certifications for "All for You"
Region	Certification	Certified units/sales
United Kingdom (BPI)	Platinum	600,000^{‡}
^{‡} Sales+streaming figures based on certification alone.
