= Here for You (Kygo song) =

2015 single by Kygo featuring Ella Henderson

Single by Kygo featuring Ella Henderson
- Released: 4 September 2015
- Recorded: 2015
- Genre: Tropical house; deep house
- Length: 4:04 (album version); 3:34 (radio edit)
- Label: Sony
- Songwriters: Kyrre Gørvell-Dahll; Ella Henderson
- Producer: Kygo

Kygo singles chronology
| "Nothing Left" (2015) | "Here for You" (2015) | "Stay" (2015) |

Ella Henderson singles chronology
| "Glitterball" (2015) | "Here for You" (2015) | "Glorious" (2019) |

Music video
- "Here for You" on YouTube

"Here for You" is a song by Norwegian DJ and record producer Kygo. It features vocals from British singer Ella Henderson. It is the vocal version of Kygo's previous track, "ID", which was released on 10 February 2015.

== Music video ==
The music video for "Here for You" was released on 29 September 2015. It was directed by Michael Maxxis and shot on location in Palm Springs, California. The video has received over 68 million views as of April 2024.

== Charts ==
=== Weekly charts ===
Weekly chart performance for "Here for You"
| Chart (2015–2016) | Peak position |
|---|---|
| Australia (ARIA) | 99 |
| Austria (Ö3 Austria Top 40) | 58 |
| Belgium (Ultratop 50 Flanders) | 50 |
| Belgium (Ultratop 50 Wallonia) | 48 |
| Czech Republic Singles Digital (ČNS IFPI) | 22 |
| Denmark (Tracklisten) | 26 |
| France (SNEP) | 55 |
| Germany (GfK) | 47 |
| Hungary (Rádiós Top 40) | 1 |
| Hungary (Single Top 40) | 7 |
| Hungary (Stream Top 40) | 21 |
| Ireland (IRMA) | 30 |
| Netherlands (Dutch Top 40) | 11 |
| Netherlands (Single Top 100) | 12 |
| Norway (VG-lista) | 9 |
| Poland Airplay (ZPAV) | 44 |
| Poland (Video Chart) | 1 |
| Scottish Singles Sales (Official Charts) | 11 |
| Slovakia Airplay (ČNS IFPI) | 58 |
| Slovakia Singles Digital (ČNS IFPI) | 22 |
| Slovenia (SloTop50) | 39 |
| Spain (Promusicae) | 40 |
| Sweden (Sverigetopplistan) | 16 |
| Switzerland (Schweizer Hitparade) | 17 |
| UK Singles (Official Charts) | 18 |
| UK Dance (Official Charts) | 8 |
| US Hot Dance/Electronic Songs (Billboard) | 12 |

=== Year-end charts ===
Year-end chart performance for "Here for You"
| Chart (2015) | Position |
|---|---|
| Hungary (Rádiós Top 40) | 61 |
| Hungary (Single Top 40) | 61 |
| Netherlands (Dutch Top 40) | 61 |
| Netherlands (Single Top 100) | 93 |
| Netherlands Dance (Mega Dance Top 50) | 24 |
| Switzerland (Schweizer Hitparade) | 75 |
| US Hot Dance/Electronic Songs (Billboard) | 60 |
| Chart (2016) | Position |
| US Hot Dance/Electronic Songs (Billboard) | 63 |

== Certifications ==
Certifications for "Here for You"
| Region | Certification | Certified units/sales |
|---|---|---|
| Australia (ARIA) | Gold | 35,000^{‡} |
| Denmark (IFPI Danmark) | Gold | 30,000^{^} |
| Italy (FIMI) | Gold | 25,000^{‡} |
| Mexico (AMPROFON) | Gold | 30,000^{‡} |
| New Zealand (RMNZ) | Gold | 7,500^{*} |
| Norway (IFPI Norway) | Gold | 20,000^{‡} |
| United Kingdom (BPI) | Silver | 200,000^{‡} |
^{*} Sales figures based on certification alone.^{^} Shipments figures based on certification alone.^{‡} Sales+streaming figures based on certification alone.

== Release history ==
Release history and formats for "Here for You"
| Region | Date | Format | Label |
|---|---|---|---|
| Various | 4 September 2015 | Digital download; streaming | Sony |
