= Dream on Me =

Single by Ella Henderson and Roger Sanchez

from the album Everything I Didn't Say and More
- Released: 2 October 2020
- Length: 3:02
- Label: Major Tom's; Asylum
- Songwriters: Gabriella Henderson; Jordan Riley; Roger Sanchez; Uzoechi Emenike; Wrabel; Steve Lukather
- Producer: Jordan Riley

Ella Henderson singles chronology
"Take Care of You" (2020)	"Dream on Me" (2020)	"Blame It on the Mistletoe" (2020)

Roger Sanchez singles chronology
"Wrek tha Discotek" (2012)	"Dream on Me" (2020)

Lyric video
- "Dream on Me" on YouTube

"Dream on Me" is a song by British singer and songwriter Ella Henderson and Dominican-American house music DJ and producer Roger Sanchez. The song was released as a single on 2 October 2020 through Asylum Records. The song was written by Henderson, Jordan Riley, Roger Sanchez, Uzoechi Emenike, Wrabel and Steve Lukather.

== Background ==
The song samples "Another Chance" by Roger Sanchez, which she described as one of her favorite songs. In an interview with the Daily Mirror, she said, "I wrote it and thought, 'I need to get this signed off by Roger'. He could have been so massively insulted we would even touch Another Chance! Thank God he was like, 'I love it!'. I loved that song. It was an era of them kind of records that have space for big vocalists. I remember the video of that person on the Tube with a massive heart!" She also said on her Instagram, "I wrote this song about missing people who I love and dreaming about being with them. It's been a ridiculous summer for all of us and I hope this song makes you dance and feel close to the people you love!"

== Personnel ==
Credits adapted from Tidal.

- Jordan Riley – Producer, composer
- Gabriella Henderson – Composer
- Roger Sanchez – Composer
- Uzoechi Osisioma Uzo Emenike – Composer
- Wrabel – Composer
- Steve Lukather – Composer

== Charts ==
Chart (2020)	Peak position
Scottish Singles Sales (Official Charts)	25
UK Singles Downloads (Official Charts)	31
