= AJ Mitchell =

American singer-songwriter (born 2001)

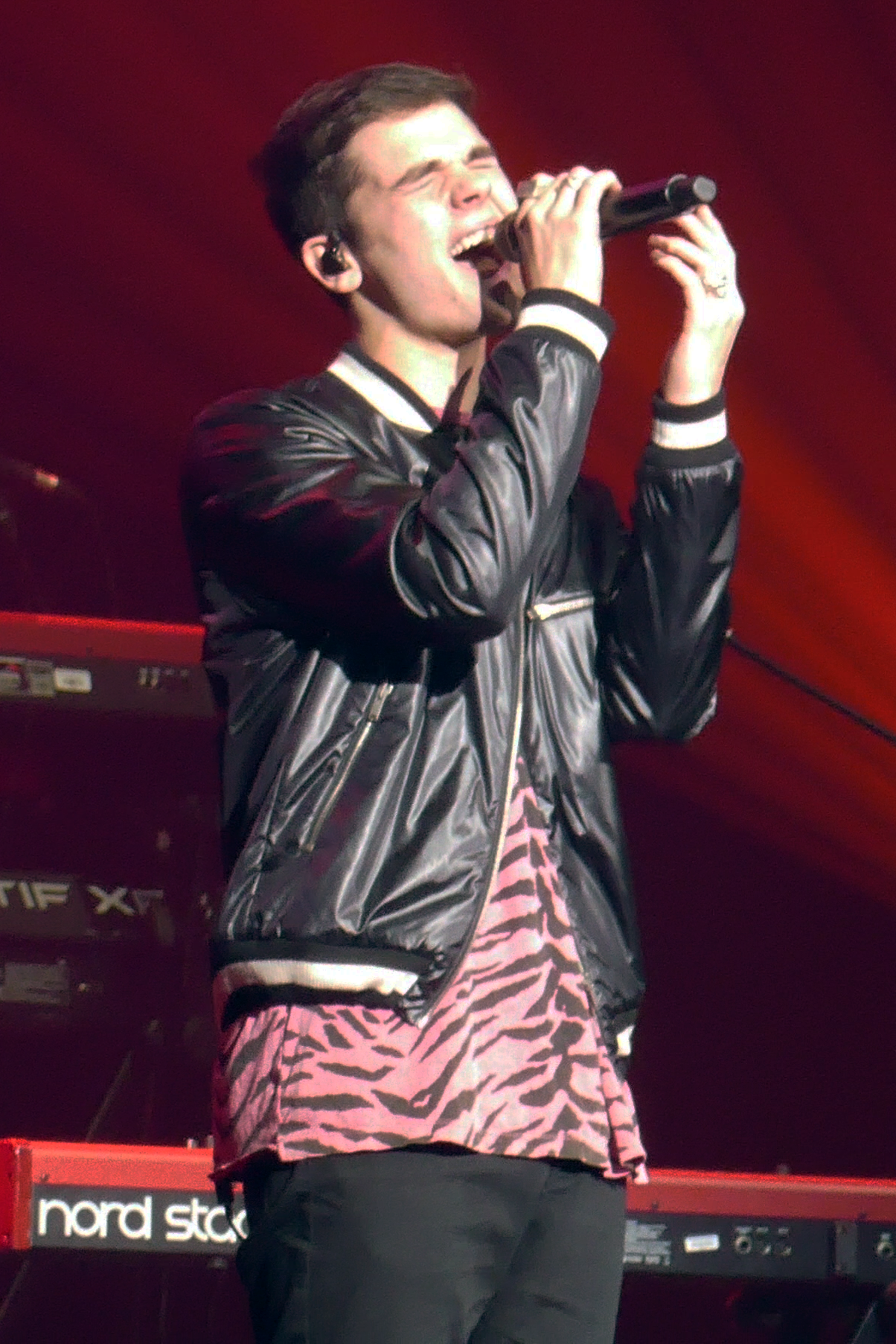
- AJ Mitchell performing at the December 2019 93.3 FLZ Jingle Ball

Background information
- Born: Aaron Fredrick Mitchell Jr. May 17, 2001 (age 25); Belleville, Illinois, U.S.
- Genres: Pop; R&B
- Occupation: Singer-songwriter
- Instruments: Vocals, piano, guitar
- Years active: 2015–present
- Website: ajmitchellmusic.com

Aaron Fredrick "AJ" Mitchell Jr. (born May 17, 2001) is an American singer-songwriter and musician. He gained a following in 2017 after posting clips of himself singing his original songs and performing covers on YouTube and Instagram. His first independent single, "Used To Be", was written by Mitchell at age 13 and has over 100 million streams.

Mitchell has four songs that have reached the Top 40 on the US radio charts, the July 2018 release "Girls", which reached No. 39, the March 2019 release "All My Friends", which reached No. 24, "Slow Dance" (featuring Ava Max), which reached No. 28, and "Stop" from his debut studio album Skyview (2021), which reached No. 33.

== Early life ==
AJ Mitchell was born in Belleville, Illinois on May 17, 2001. His mother, Allison Mitchell, is a small business owner and his father, Aaron Fredrick Mitchell Sr, is a traveling nurse. AJ is the couple's only son and youngest child, after their daughters Andrea and Addison (Addy).

Mitchell began piano lessons at 4, inspired by his father, who was also learning to play piano and write songs. Mitchell attended Belleville West High School, where he played on the football team and sang in the school choir.

== Career ==
=== 2015–2016: Career beginnings ===
By 13, Mitchell began performing at local open-mic nights in his hometown and posting covers on YouTube and Instagram, which helped him gain a significant following. Mitchell's social media fan base helped him capture the attention of the LA-based artist manager Mike Spitz whom Mitchell has worked with since 2015.

Mitchell's videos on social media granted him an opportunity to relocate to Los Angeles in 2015 to collaborate with internet marketing agency Team 10. After a brief period together, Mitchell left the group to focus his energy entirely on music.

=== 2017–2018: Hopeful ===
In 2017, Mitchell released his first independent single "Used to Be", a song he wrote at age 13. The song was produced by hip-hop producer and engineer Mike Dean. "Used to Be" has now gained over 150 million streams.

After departing the social media group, Mitchell received interest from many different record labels but eventually decided to sign with Epic Records. He inked his first major deal with the label in February 2018.

Mitchell's first studio EP with Epic, Hopeful, was released in July 2018. Its lead single "Girls", co-written by Mitchell and Romans, reached No. 39 on the US Mediabase pop radio chart. In November 2018, Billboard and Vevo named Mitchell one of the top 19 artists to watch in 2019.

Epic Records CEO Sylvia Rhone referred to Mitchell's music as "exciting things to come", when discussing the growing talent roster at the record label.

In 2018, Mitchell collaborated with Bay Area R&B singer-songwriter Marteen for the song "No Plans". Marteen later joined Mitchell in a support slot on the following year's 2019 Hopeful Tour.

=== 2019–2022: Slow Dance and Skyview ===
In May 2019, Mitchell collaborated with songwriting duo Teamwork and Scottish singer-songwriter Nina Nesbitt on the song "After Hours".

In June 2019, Mitchell signed a new joint deal with Insanity Records, a subsidiary to Sony Music.

On August 23, 2019, Mitchell released his second EP Slow Dance, which includes his singles "Talk So Much", "Move On", and the title track featuring American singer Ava Max.

Mitchell's debut studio album Skyview was released in October 2021 and includes the singles "Used to Be", "Slow Dance", "Cameras On", and "Stop".

=== 2023–present: As Far as the Eye Can See ===
Mitchell released a new single "Passionate" in December 2023, followed by "Foolish" and "Flowers on the Moon" in early 2024. His second album titled As Far as the Eye Can See was originally scheduled for release in May 2024 and a North American tour was announced. However, on May 25, 2024, Mitchell announced that he had parted ways with his record label and postponed the album and tour. As Far as the Eye Can See's release was later rescheduled for March 7, 2025.

== Influences ==
Mitchell cites a wide variety of music as influential to his songwriting style, regularly noting his admiration of artists like Bruno Mars and Lil Wayne.

== Discography ==
=== Studio albums ===
| Title | Details |
|---|---|
| Skyview | Released: October 8, 2021; Label: Epic; Formats: Digital download, streaming |
| As Far as the Eye Can See | Released: March 7, 2025; Label: Glasshouse; Formats: Digital download, streaming |

=== Extended plays ===
| Title | Details |
|---|---|
| Hopeful | Released: July 20, 2018; Label: Epic; Formats: Digital download, streaming |
| Slow Dance | Released: August 23, 2019; Label: Epic; Formats: Digital download, streaming |

=== Singles ===
==== As lead artist ====
List of singles as lead artist, showing year released, selected chart positions, certifications and album details
| Title | Year | Peak chart positions | Certifications | Album |
| Title | Year | US Pop | Certifications | Album |
|---|---|---|---|---|
| "Somebody" | 2018 | — | | Non-album single |
| "Used to Be" | 2018 | — | | Skyview |
| "Mind" | 2018 | — | | Non-album single |
| "Girls" | 2018 | — | | Hopeful |
| "No Plans" (featuring Marteen) | 2018 | — | | Non-album singles |
| "All My Friends" | 2019 | 24 | | Non-album singles |
| "Talk So Much" | 2019 | — | | Slow Dance |
| "Afterhours" (with Teamwork and Nina Nesbitt) | 2019 | — | | Non-album singles |
| "Without You Now" (with Digital Farm Animals) | 2019 | — | | Non-album singles |
| "Move On" | 2019 | — | | Slow Dance |
| "Slow Dance" (featuring Ava Max) | 2019 | 28 | RIAA: Gold | Slow Dance and Skyview |
| "Down in Flames" | 2019 | — | | Non-album singles |
| "Like Strangers Do" | 2019 | — | | Non-album singles |
| "Say It Again" | 2019 | — | | Non-album singles |
| "Unstoppable" | 2019 | — | | Non-album singles |
| "Spring Break" (featuring Rich the Kid) | 2020 | — | | Non-album singles |
| "Burn" | 2020 | — | | Non-album singles |
| "Blame It on the Mistletoe" (with Ella Henderson) | 2020 | — | | Non-album singles |
| "Cameras On" | 2021 | — | | Skyview |
| "Stop" | 2021 | 33 | | Skyview |
| "Growing Pains" | 2021 | — | | Non-album singles |
| "One More Fight" | 2021 | — | | Non-album singles |
| "Passionate" | 2023 | — | | As Far as the Eye Can See |
| "Foolish" | 2024 | — | | As Far as the Eye Can See |
| "Flowers on the Moon" | 2024 | — | | As Far as the Eye Can See |
| "One on One" | 2024 | — | | As Far as the Eye Can See |
| "Won't Be Long" | 2025 | — | | As Far as the Eye Can See |
| "Try Again" | 2026 | — | | TBA |
| "Hold You Up" | 2026 | — | | TBA |
"—" denotes a recording that did not chart or was not released.

==== As featured artist ====
List of singles as featured artist, showing year released, selected chart positions and album details
| Title | Year | Peak chart positions | Album |
| Title | Year | US Dance | Album |
|---|---|---|---|
| "Imagine" (Steve Aoki and Frank Walker featuring AJ Mitchell) | 2020 | 42 | Non-album singles |
| "Stuck in My Head" (Captain Cuts featuring AJ Mitchell) | 2020 | — | Non-album singles |
| "Hate You + Love You" (Cheat Codes featuring AJ Mitchell) | 2021 | 11 | Hellraisers, Pt. 1 |
"—" denotes a recording that did not chart or was not released.

=== Guest appearances ===
List of non-single guest appearances, with other performing artists, showing year released and album name
| Title | Year | Other artist(s) | Album |
|---|---|---|---|
| "After You" | 2020 | Meghan Trainor | Treat Myself |

== Tours ==
- Hopeful Tour (2019)
