= Blame It on the Mistletoe =

Single by Ella Henderson and AJ Mitchell
- Released: 4 December 2020
- Length: 3:05
- Label: Asylum
- Songwriters: Gabriella Henderson; Jez Ashurst; Julie Frost; Tre Jean-Marie
- Producers: Jez Ashurst; Tre Jean-Marie

Ella Henderson singles chronology
"Dream on Me" (2020)	"Blame It on the Mistletoe" (2020)	"Let's Go Home Together" (2021)

AJ Mitchell singles chronology
"Stuck in My Head" (2020)	"Blame It on the Mistletoe" (2020)	"Hate You + Love You" (2021)

Lyric video
- "Blame It on the Mistletoe" on YouTube

"Blame It on the Mistletoe" is a song by British singer and songwriter Ella Henderson and American singer-songwriter and musician AJ Mitchell. It was released as a digital download and for streaming on 4 December 2020 through Asylum Records. The song was written by Henderson, Jez Ashurst, Julie Frost and Tre Jean-Marie.

== Background ==
On her social media accounts, Henderson said, "What a whirlwind of a year 2020 has been... it's been a rollercoaster of life lessons & emotions for me... but a year I certainly won't ever forget! I hope everyone stays safe & well this Xmas time!! ... & make sure you stick my new Christmas tune on when your having a cheeky bevy or two this December."

== Personnel ==
Credits adapted from Tidal.

- Jez Ashurst – producer, composer, bass, drums, guitar, piano, programmer, reco-reco, strings, synthesizer
- Tre Jean-Marie – producer, composer, backing vocals, bass, drums, guitar, mixer, piano, programmer, strings, synthesizer
- Gabriella Henderson – composer, vocals
- Julie Frost – composer
- Niamh Murphy – backing vocals
- David Emery – mastering
- AJ Mitchell – vocals

== Charts ==
Chart performance for "Blame It on the Mistletoe"
Chart (2020–2022)	Peak position
Germany (GfK)	75
Ireland (IRMA)	94
New Zealand Hot Singles (RMNZ)	28
