= Glorious (Ella Henderson song) =

2019 song by Ella Henderson

Single by Ella Henderson

from the EP Glorious
- Released: 13 September 2019
- Length: 3:04
- Label: Asylum; Atlantic
- Songwriters: Ella Henderson; Louis Schoorl; Marco Daniel Borrero; Natalie Dunn
- Producers: Dante Hemingway; Louis Schoorl; Mag

Ella Henderson singles chronology
"Here for You" (2015)	"Glorious" (2019)	"Young" (2019)

Visualizer
- "Glorious" on YouTube

"Glorious" is a song by British singer and songwriter Ella Henderson. The song was released as a digital download on 13 September 2019 as the lead single from her debut extended play, Glorious. It's Henderson first release under Atlantic Records after parting ways with Syco Music. The song did not enter the UK Singles Chart, but peaked at number 40 on the Official Singles Sales Chart, which counts only paid-for sales in the UK. The song was written by Henderson, Louis Schoorl, Marco Daniel Borrero and Natalie Dunn.

== Background ==
Talking about the song, Henderson said, "Writing 'Glorious' was a mind-cleansing moment for me. It represents the first time I truly began to start celebrating everything I used to live in fear of. Learning to accept and love yourself for who you are can be difficult in this day and age. ‘Glorious’ stands for everything we should feel about ourselves – empowered and proud."

== Charts ==
Chart performance for "Glorious"
Chart (2019)	Peak position
Scottish Singles Sales (Official Charts)	42
UK Singles Downloads (Official Charts)	40

== Release history ==
Release formats for "Glorious"
Region	Date	Format	Label
United Kingdom	13 September 2019	Digital download; streaming	Asylum; Atlantic
