= List of number-one songs of the 2020s (Slovakia) =

Rádio Top 100 Oficiálna is the official chart of Slovakia, ranking the top songs based on radio airplay as compiled and published weekly by the Slovak national section (SNS IFPI). Beginning in 2010, IFPI Czech Republic took over that responsibility.

Below are the songs that reached number one on the chart from December 2019.

== Number-one songs ==
Issue date	Artist	Song	Weeks at number one
2020
December 9, 2019	Tones and I	"Dance Monkey"	7
January 27	Maroon 5	"Memories"	12
April 20	VIZE featuring Lania	"Stars"	1
April 27	Regard	"Ride It"	1
May 4	Topic	"Breaking Me"	1
May 11	Saint Jhn	"Roses"	3
June 1	Felix Jaehn and VIZE featuring Miss Li	"Close Your Eyes"	3
June 22	Topic	"Breaking Me"	2
July 6	Saint Jhn	"Roses"	1
July 13	Felix Jaehn and VIZE featuring Miss Li	"Close Your Eyes"	1
July 20	Ava Max	"Salt"	6
August 24	Dua Lipa	"Physical"	1
August 31	Surf Mesa featuring Emilee	"ILY (I Love You Baby)"	1
September 7	Nea	"Some Say"	12
November 30	Joel Corry featuring MNEK	"Head & Heart"	2
December 14	Twocolors	"Lovefool"	1
December 28	Kygo and Donna Summer	"Hot Stuff"	3
2021
January 18	Joel Corry featuring MNEK	"Head & Heart"	1
January 25	Twocolors	"Lovefool"	2
February 8	Ofenbach and Quarterback featuring Norma Jean Martine	"Head Shoulders Knees & Toes"	3
March 1	Kygo and Donna Summer	"Hot Stuff"	1
March 8	Robin Schulz featuring Kiddo	"All We Got"	1
March 15	Ofenbach and Quarterback featuring Norma Jean Martine	"Head Shoulders Knees & Toes"	1
March 22	Robin Schulz featuring Kiddo	"All We Got"	2
April 5	Ofenbach and Quarterback featuring Norma Jean Martine	"Head Shoulders Knees & Toes"	1
April 12	Robin Schulz featuring Kiddo	"All We Got"	4
May 10	Tiësto	"The Business"	2
May 24	Ofenbach featuring Lagique	"Wasted Love"	1
May 31	Tiësto	"The Business"	1
June 7	Ofenbach featuring Lagique	"Wasted Love"	1
June 14	Ed Sheeran	"Afterglow"	1
June 21	The Kid Laroi	"Without You"	1
June 28	Imagine Dragons	"Follow You"	1
July 5	The Kid Laroi	"Without You"	1
July 12	Pink and Willow Sage Hart	"Cover Me in Sunshine"	1
July 19	Imagine Dragons	"Follow You"	1
July 26	Pink and Willow Sage Hart	"Cover Me in Sunshine"	4
August 23	Ed Sheeran	"Bad Habits"	13
November 22	Shouse	"Love Tonight"	4
December 20	The Kid Laroi and Justin Bieber	"Stay"	1
December 27	Lost Frequencies	"Where Are You Now"	14
2022
April 4	Glass Animals	"Heat Waves"	1
April 11	Lost Frequencies	"Where Are You Now"	1
April 18	Ed Sheeran	"Overpass Graffiti"	2
May 2	Ofenbach and Ella Henderson	"Hurricane"	1
May 9	Glockenbach featuring ClockClock	"Brooklyn"	1
May 16	Alle Farben featuring KIDDO	"Alright"	1
May 23	Imagine Dragons featuring JID	"Enemy"	7
July 11	Camila Cabello featuring Ed Sheeran	"Bam Bam"	2
July 25	Imagine Dragons featuring JID	"Enemy"	1
August 1	Ray Dalton and Álvaro Soler	"Manila"	1
August 8	Harry Styles	"As It Was"	1
August 15	Ray Dalton and Álvaro Soler	"Manila"	1
August 22	Harry Styles	"As It Was"	2
September 5	Álvaro Soler and Topic	"Solo para ti"	2
September 19	Camila Cabello featuring Ed Sheeran	"Bam Bam"	3
October 10	Álvaro Soler and Topic	"Solo para ti"	1
October 17	Kamrad	"I Believe"	6
November 28	David Guetta and Bebe Rexha	"I'm Good (Blue)"	13
2023
February 27	Glockenbach featuring Asdis	"Dirty Dancing"	2
March 13	Ed Sheeran	"Celestial"	1
March 20	Miley Cyrus	"Flowers"	10
May 29	Martin Garrix and JVKE	"Hero"	1
June 5	Miley Cyrus	"Flowers"	1
June 12	Kamrad	"Feel Alive"	2
June 26	Imagine Dragons	"Symphony"	5
July 31	David Guetta, Anne-Marie and Coi Leray	"Baby Don't Hurt Me"	2
August 14	Hex	"Pomaranče z Kuby"	1
August 21	Ray Dalton	"Do It Again"	4
September 18	Michael Schulte and R3HAB	"Waterfall"	5
October 23	Nico Santos	"Number 1"	1
October 30	Lost Frequencies	"The Feeling"	5
December 4	Topic and HRVY	"All or Nothing"	1
December 11	Anne-Marie and Shania Twain	"Unhealthy"	2
December 25	Dua Lipa	"Houdini"	2
2024
January 8	Ofenbach featuring Norma Jean Martine	"Overdrive"	6
February 19	Dua Lipa	"Houdini"	10
April 29	Cyril	"Stumblin' In"	1
May 6	Dua Lipa	"Houdini"	1
May 13	Cyril	"Stumblin' In"	3
June 3	Ella Henderson featuring Rudimental	"Alibi"	4
July 1	Artemas	"I Like the Way You Kiss Me"	2
July 15	Imagine Dragons	"Eyes Closed"	3
August 5	Artemas	"I Like the Way You Kiss Me"	1
August 12	Imagine Dragons	"Eyes Closed"	3
September 2	Glockenbach and Chris de Sarandy	"Magic Moment"	2
September 16	Eminem	"Houdini"	1
September 23	Mark Ambor	"Belong Together"	3
October 14	Hozier	"Too Sweet"	1
October 21	Mark Ambor	"Belong Together"	7
December 9	Eminem	"Houdini"	1
December 16	Shaboozey	"A Bar Song (Tipsy)"	3
2025
January 6	Shawn Mendes	"Why Why Why"	4
February 3	David Guetta, Alphaville and Ava Max	"Forever Young"	2
February 17	Coldplay	"We Pray"	7
April 7	Myles Smith	"Nice to Meet You"	8
June 3	Robin Schulz and Cyril featuring Sam Martin	"World Gone Wild"	1
June 10	Shaboozey	"Good News"	3
June 30	Benson Boone	"Sorry I'm Here for Someone Else"	1
July 7	David Guetta and Sia	"Beautiful People"	3
July 28	Alex Warren	"Ordinary	6
September 8	Rudimental and Khalid	"All I Know"	1
September 15	Alex Warren	"Ordinary"	6
October 27	WizTheMc & Bees and Honey	"Show Me Love"	1
November 3	Alex Warren	"Ordinary"	1
November 10	Neiked and Portugal. The Man	"Glide"	5
December 15	Taylor Swift	"The Fate of Ophelia"	4
2026
January 12	David Guetta, Teddy Swims and Tones and I	"Gone Gone Gone"	1
January 19	Taylor Swift	"The Fate of Ophelia"	2
February 2	Lady Gaga	"The Dead Dance"	1
February 9	Taylor Swift	"The Fate of Ophelia"	1
February 16	David Guetta, Teddy Swims and Tones and I	"Gone Gone Gone"	1
February 23	Taylor Swift	"The Fate of Ophelia"	3
March 16	Shakira	"Zoo"	2
March 30	Taylor Swift	"Opalite"	2
April 13	Topic, Fireboy DML and Nico Santos	"Body"	3
May 4	Ray Dalton	"Blood Running"	2
May 18	Djo	"End of Beginning"	3
June 8	Alex Warren	"Fever Dream"	3
June 29	Djo	"End of Beginning"	6
August 10	Shakira and Burna Boy	"Dai Dai"	9
October 12	Temper City	"Self Aware"	2
October 26	Alex Warren	"Passenger"	1
November 2	Temper City	"Self Aware"	3

== See also ==
- 2020s in music
- List of number-one songs of the 2020s (Czech Republic)
