= Megan McKenna discography =

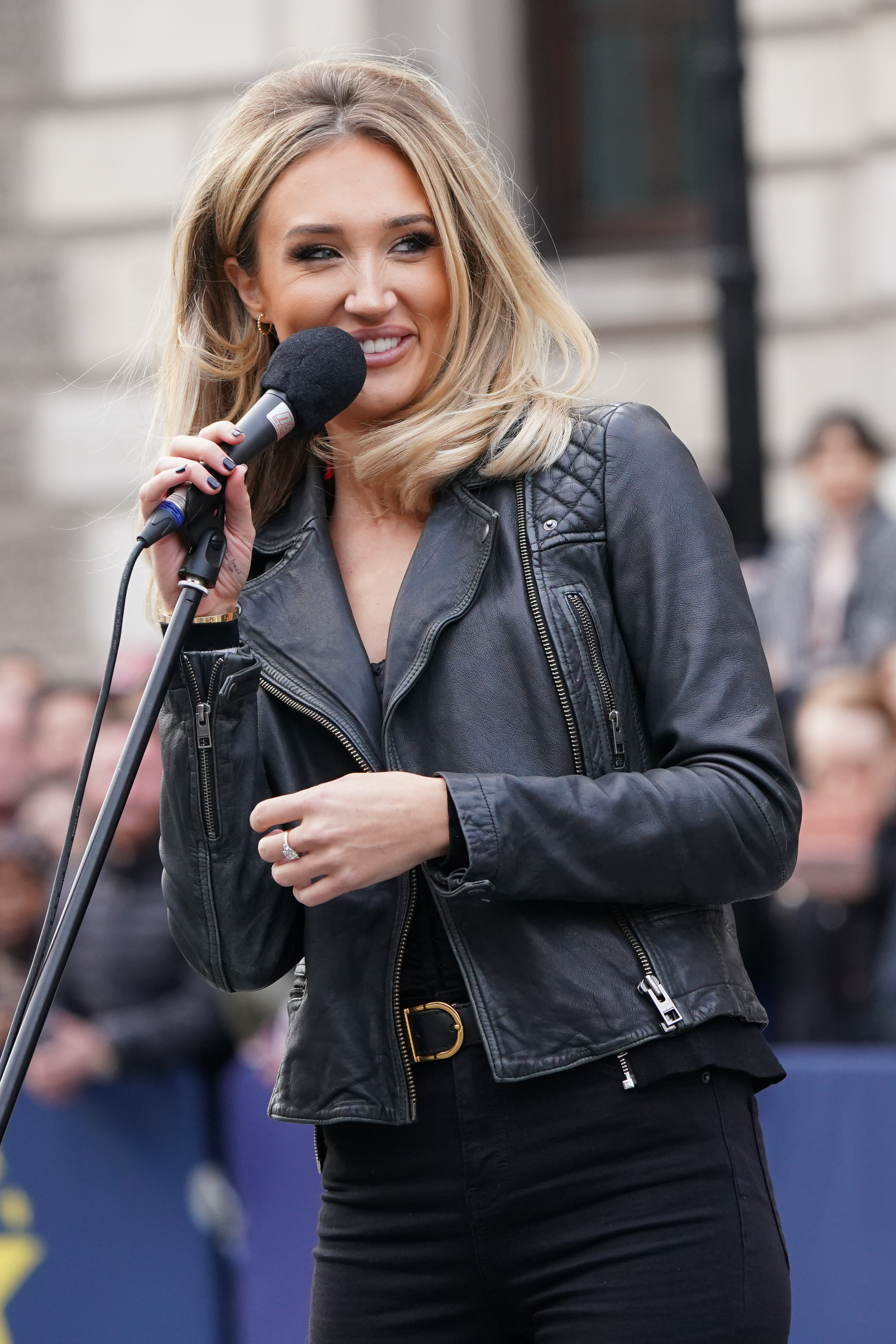
- McKenna performing in 2019
- Studio albums: 1
- EPs: 1
- Singles: 23
- Music videos: 3
- Promotional singles: 20

English singer Megan McKenna has released one studio album, one extended play, fourteen singles and three music videos. Her debut studio album, Story of Me, was released in December 2018. The album includes the singles "High Heeled Shoes", "History" and "Everything but You". In 2019, she won The X Factor: Celebrity, winning a record deal with Syco. In June 2022, McKenna announced that she had parted ways with Syco. She explained that they had heavily influenced her pop music releases as they had preferred them to the country songs McKenna had instead wanted to release. Following the departure, she announced that she would be independently releasing a song a week, beginning with the single "Baby Talk" on 24 June 2022.

== Studio albums ==
Title	Details	Peak chart positions	
Title	Details	UK Country	UK Down.
Story of Me	Released: 7 December 2018; Label: FrtyFve; Format: CD, digital download	4	28

== Singles ==
=== As lead artist ===
Title	Year	Peak chart positions			Album
Title	Year	UK	UK Sales	SCO	Album
"High Heeled Shoes"	2017	43	—	6	Story of Me
"Far Cry from Love"	2017	53	—	12	Story of Me
"History"	2018	—	75	58	Story of Me
"Everything but You"	2018	—	29	26	Story of Me
"It Must Have Been Love (Christmas for the Broken Hearted)"	2019	—	40	40	Non-album singles
"This"	2021	—	13	29	Non-album singles
"Ruin Your Night"	2021	—	—	—	Non-album singles
"Won't Go Back Again"	2021	—	—	—	Non-album singles
"Family at Christmas"	2021	—	—	—	Non-album singles
"Baby Talk"	2022	—	—	—	Non-album singles
"Confetti"	2022	—	—	—	Non-album singles
"DNA"	2022	—	—	—	Non-album singles
"Sinking Boats"	2022	—	—	—	Non-album singles
"Single"	2022	—	—	—	Non-album singles
"Swan Lake"	2022	—	—	—	Non-album singles
"Heart’s Letting Go"	2022	—	—	—	Non-album singles
"Stronger"	2022	—	—	—	Non-album singles
"The Good, The Bad and The Bitch"	2022	—	—	—	Non-album singles
"Too Late"	2022	—	—	—	Non-album singles
"Dear Mr Right"	2022	—	—	—	Non-album singles
"Vulnerable"	2022	—	—	—	Non-album singles
"Little Lies"	2022	—	—	—	Non-album singles
"Crazy Life"	2022	—	—	—	Non-album singles
"—" denotes items which were not released in that country or failed to chart.

=== As featured artist ===
Title	Year	Peak chart positions		Album
Title	Year	UK	SCO	Album
"Run" (as part of The X Factor Celebrities 2019)	2019	87	3	Non-album single

=== Promotional singles ===
Title	Year	Album
"Stronger"	2019	The X Factor: Celebrity
"Half of My Heart"	2019	The X Factor: Celebrity
"When I'm Crying"	2019	The X Factor: Celebrity
"Odds"	2019	Story of Me
"Story of Me"	2019	Story of Me
"One More Sleep"	2019	The X Factor: Celebrity
"The Winner Takes It All"	2022	Non-album promotional singles
"This" (Country version)	2022	Non-album promotional singles
"Teenage Kicks"	2022	Non-album promotional singles
"Everytime"	2022	Non-album promotional singles
"Landslide"	2022	Non-album promotional singles
"Ruin Your Night" (Acoustic version)	2022	Non-album promotional singles
"I Dreamed a Dream"	2022	Non-album promotional singles
"Defying Gravity"	2022	Non-album promotional singles
"Fields of Gold"	2022	Non-album promotional singles
"Sweet Caroline"	2022	Non-album promotional singles
"Blue Christmas"	2022	Non-album promotional singles
"Family at Christmas" (Country version)	2022	Non-album promotional singles
"Silent Night"	2022	Non-album promotional singles
"Auld Lang Syne"	2022	Non-album promotional singles

== Other charted songs ==
Title	Year	Peak chart positions		Album
Title	Year	UK	SCO	Album
"Far Cry from Love"	2017	53	12	Story of Me

== Music videos ==
Title	Year	Director(s)	Ref.
"High Heeled Shoes"	2017	Oliver Prout	
"Run" (as part of The X Factor Celebrities 2019)	2019	Unknown	
"This"	2021	Jasper Koryczan	
