= Catherine McGrath =

Northern Irish singer and songwriter

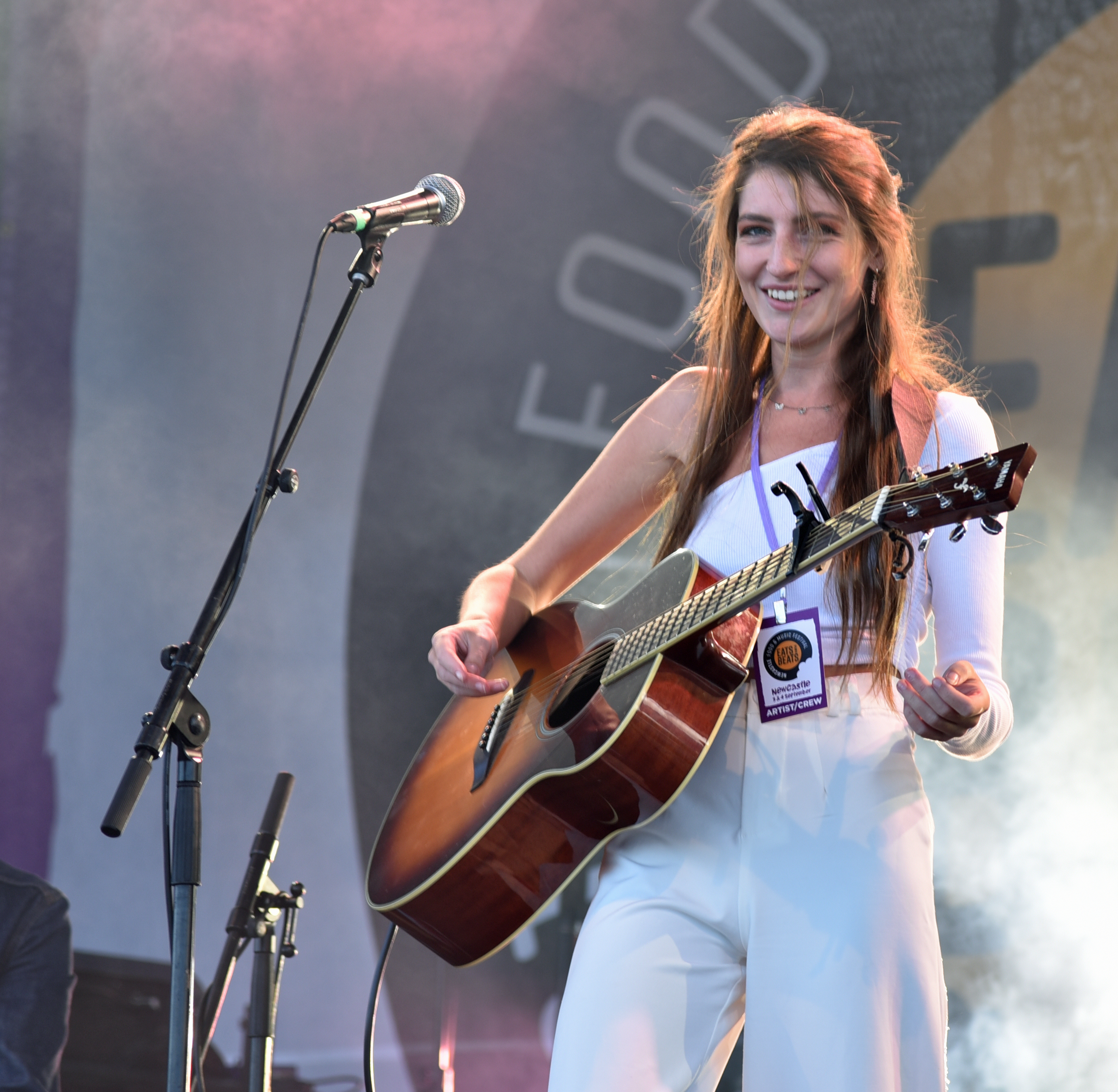
- McGrath in 2022

Background information
- Born: Catherine McGrath; 9 June 1997 (age 29); Rostrevor, County Down, Northern Ireland
- Genres: Country pop
- Occupations: Singer; songwriter
- Instruments: Vocals; guitar
- Years active: 2016–present
- Label: Warner Bros. Records
- Website: www.catherinemcgrathofficial.com

Catherine McGrath (born 9 June 1997) is an Irish country music singer and songwriter.

== Career ==
=== Early life ===
Born in Rostrevor, Northern Ireland, McGrath learned guitar from her grandmother, who taught her to play and sing "The Lion Sleeps Tonight". McGrath's parents are both musicians and were frequent performers at the annual Fiddler's Green Music Festival held in County Down, Northern Ireland. McGrath honed her skills by observing her parents on-stage and by watching instructional videos online. McGrath took up songwriting, and in addition to performing her own material, she began making homemade videos of herself performing current pop hits, which she then posted online. McGrath has said that her country music influences include Taylor Swift, Kacey Musgraves, Kelsea Ballerini, Brad Paisley, and Rascal Flatts; she credits Swift's song "Love Story" in particular for introducing her to country music at the age of 12.

=== 2016–present: Signing with Warner Bros. Records and debut studio album ===
McGrath's videos attracted the attention of Instrumental, a company that finds talent online and grooms them for larger success. She moved to London to work for the company, and after only a few months, began travelling to Nashville for songwriting and studio sessions. In the summer of 2016, McGrath signed with Warner Bros. She recorded and released her first solo EP One in December later that same year. Her major label debut album, Talk of This Town, was released on 27 July 2018. McGrath played a set at the C2C: Country to Country festival in 2019 and joined Hunter Hayes on stage at the O2 Arena to duet on their song "Don't Let Me Forget".

== Discography ==
=== Studio albums ===
Title	Details	Peak chart positions			
Title	Details	IRE	SCO	UK	UK Country
Talk of This Town	Release date: 27 July 2018; Label: Warner Bros.; Formats: CD, digital	17	9	13	1

=== Extended plays ===
Title	Details
One	Release date: 23 December 2016; Label: Warner Bros.
Starting from Now	Release date: 9 June 2017; Label: Warner Bros.

=== Singles ===
Year	Title	Album
2017	"Talk of This Town"	Talk of This Town
2017	"Thought It Was Gonna Be Me"	Talk of This Town
2018	"Wild"	Talk of This Town
2019	"Grace"	Non-album singles
2023	"Next New Year"	Non-album singles

=== Music Videos ===
Year	Video
2017	"Talk Of This Town"
2018	"Thought It Was Gonna Be Me"
2018	"Don't Let Me Forget
2018	"Lost In The Middle"
2018	"Wild"

== Writing credits ==
Year	Title	Artist	Album
2018	"Paperboy"	Megan McKenna	Story of Me
2018	"High Heeled Shoes"	Megan McKenna	Story of Me

== Recognition ==
In 2018, McGrath was fan-voted as the winner of the International Emerging Artist of The Year award in the Music for a New Generation Awards, run by Australian country radio program, Planet Country.
