= Quarterhead =

Career and Discography information about a musical artist

- Origin: Wetzlar, Germany
- Years active: 2010–present
- Members: Josh Tapen; Janik Riegert

Quarterhead is a songwriting and production duo from Germany, formed by Josh Tapen and Janik Riegert in 2010.

== Career ==
The duo's international breakthrough happened in 2020 with the electronic dance song "Head Shoulders Knees & Toes" together with French DJ duo Ofenbach and American singer Norma Jean Martine. The song reached gold and platinum status in 10 countries and over 500 million streams.

The song was written in their last session before the first lockdown of the COVID-19 pandemic in February 2020.

Other releases include collaborations with Nelly Furtado, Cheat Codes, Hugel, Kiddo, Robin Schulz, Felix Jaehn and Sabrina Carpenter.

In the years before the breakthrough Quarterhead wrote and produced in the background for artists like Ofenbach, Ella Henderson, LUM!X, Gabry Ponte, Dubdogz, Ilira or Benjamin Ingrosso.

The duo is currently signed to Virgin Records / Universal and Kobalt Music in London.

== Discography ==
=== Singles ===
- 2016: "Like I Do" (featuring Jake Reese)
- 2017: "Hurts So Good" (with S Y K Ë S)
- 2017: "Habits"
- 2017: "I Can Sleep When I'm Dead"
- 2019: "Comfort Zone" (with Alle Farben)
- 2019: "Hunter" (with Richard Judge)
- 2019: "Candy Shop"
- 2020: "Head Shoulders Knees & Toes" (with Ofenbach featuring Norma Jean Martine)
- 2021: "Touch My Body"
- 2021: "Eyes & You" (with Hugel)
- 2021: "Love So Sweet"
- 2021: "Lucky" (with Cheat Codes and Kiddo)
- 2022: "Nichts Mehr Zu Sagen" (with Max Giesinger)
- 2023: "Remedy" (with Matt Sassari and Miggy De La Rosa)
- 2023: "Get Away" (with Raphaella & Tenchi)
- 2023: "Major Lazer" (with KSHMR)
- 2023: "You Will See"
- 2025: "The Feeling" (with Matoma and Caden)

=== Remixes ===
- 2018: Dan + Shay – "Tequila"
- 2018: Backstreet Boys – "Don't Go Breaking My Heart"
- 2018: HUGEL & Taio Cruz – "Signs"
- 2018: Ofenbach featuring Benjamin Ingrosso – "Paradise"
- 2019: Robin Schulz featuring Erika Sirola – "Speechless"
- 2021: Robin Schulz and Felix Jaehn featuring Alida – "One More Time"
- 2021: Sabrina Carpenter – "Skin"
- 2021: Nelly Furtado - "All Good Things (Come to an End)"
- 2022: Snakehips and Bryce Vine - "Water"
- 2023: Rea Garvey - "Free Like the Ocean"

=== Songwriting and production ===
- 2016: "#Zwilling" - Die Lochis
- 2017: "365 Tage" - Wincent Weiss
- 2018: "Paradise" - Ofenbach feat. Benjamin Ingrosso
- 2018: "Kartenhaus" - Kayef feat. Prinz Pi
- 2018: "Die Liebe Kommt Niemals Aus Der Mode" - Michelle
- 2018: "Traumzone" - toksï feat. Dardan
- 2018: "Ballons" - Alexander Knappe
- 2019: "Alice" - Jack Curley
- 2019: "Gold Baby" - leShuuk
- 2019: "Diablo" - ILIRA & Juan Magán
- 2019: "Dreamcatcher" - Schiller & Jhyve
- 2019: "Comfort Zone" with Alle Farben
- 2019: "Different for Us" - Alle Farben feat. Jordan Powers
- 2019: "Insane" - Ofenbach
- 2020: "The Passenger" - LUM!X × MOKABY & D.T.E × Gabry Ponte
- 2020: "Damn Damn" - LeShuuk & D.T.E
- 2020: "Liebe & Krieg" - Ela
- 2020: "Ehrlich Kompliziert" - Ela
- 2020: "Sanduhr" - Kaled
- 2020: "Head Shoulders Knees & Toes" with Ofenbach
- 2020: "Cookie Dough" - Dubdogz
- 2021: "Echo" - YVES V
- 2021: "More Than I Can Say" - Gamper & Dadoni & D.T:E
- 2021: "Hurricane" - Ofenbach & Ella Henderson
- 2022: "Too Late for Love" - 3LAU
- 2022: "Peace" - Nico & Vinz
- 2022: "Pride (In the Name of Love)" - D.T.E
- 2022: "Love Me Like You Do" - D.T.E
- 2022: "It's a Hard Knock Live" - D.T.E & Prezioso
- 2022: "Love Me Like You Do" - D.T.E
- 2022: "Body Over Mind" - FDVM
- 2022: "Private" - Ofenbach & Sam Gray
- 2023: "Lullaby" - D.T.E
- 2023: "Paradise" - D.T.E
- 2023: "MAMA" - D.T.E
- 2023: "Giants" - Declan J Donovan
