= Nick Waterhouse =

American singer-songwriter and record producer (born 1986)

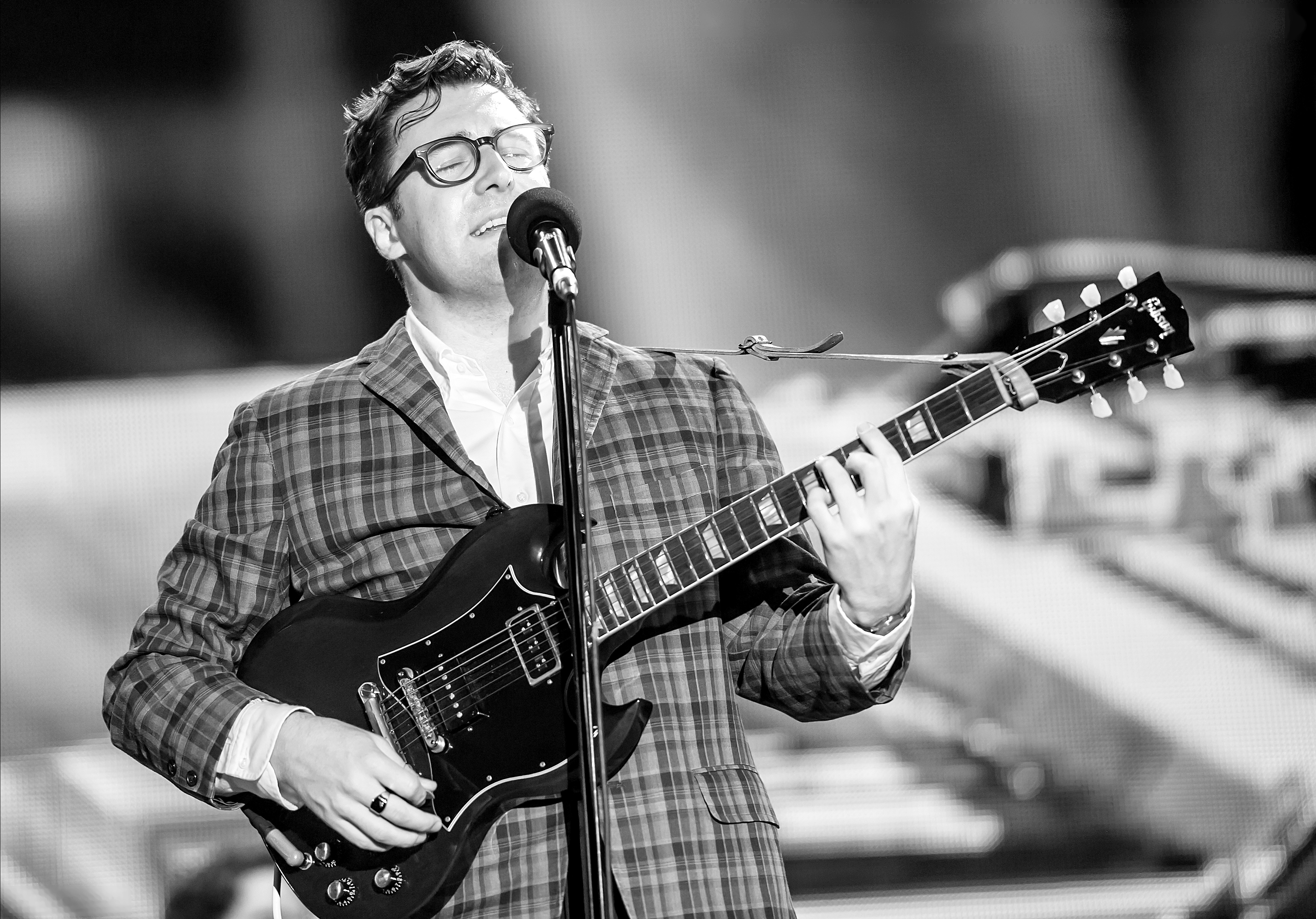
- Nick Waterhouse at Heineken Jazzaldia, 2016

Background information
- Born: Nick Ryan Waterhouse; February 8, 1986 (age 40); Santa Ana, California, US
- Origin: Los Angeles
- Genres: Jazz, Rhythm and blues, Doo-wop, Soul, Garage rock
- Occupations: Musician, singer-songwriter
- Instruments: Vocals, guitar
- Years active: 2002–present
- Label: Innovative Leisure Records

Nick Ryan Waterhouse (born February 8, 1986) is an American singer-songwriter and Grammy award-winning record producer from Los Angeles. He is a guitarist and singer known for a sound rooted in Jazz, Rhythm and blues, and Soul.

== Early life ==
Waterhouse was born in Santa Ana, California. He was raised in Huntington Beach, California, the son of a fireman and a saleswoman. He took up guitar at age 12. As a young teen he found himself more interested in increasingly obscure and eclectic Americana outside of the pop and contemporary rock of his peers. He has cited Bert Berns, Mose Allison, John Lee Hooker, Van Morrison, and a reading of Peter Guralnick's portrait of Dan Penn as early influences in his musical development.

Waterhouse started his career as guitarist and singer-songwriter with Intelligista (2002–2003), a combo compared to The Animals and High Numbers-era The Who. This band performed in the Orange County underground music scene that yielded artists such as Ty Segall, Mikal Cronin, The Growlers, Cold War Kids. In 2002, the band entered the Distillery in Costa Mesa to record a radio broadcast and a 7-inch single, beginning a friendship between Waterhouse and owner-engineer Mike McHugh. At the end of high school, the band split, finding Waterhouse attending San Francisco State University in San Francisco.

In San Francisco, Waterhouse continued pursuing playing music with little luck, concurrently becoming more involved with the burgeoning DJ community. During this time, he became a fixture at the all-vinyl Rooky Ricardo's Records in the Lower Haight District, eventually taking a job. He has repeatedly cited apprenticeship to owner Richard Vivian and the shop's connections to local soul club scene as a great influence. During this time he also struck up a friendship with Matthew Correia, later of the Allah-Las.

== Career ==
Waterhouse recorded his debut single in late 2010 at the Distillery Studio in Southern California. "Some Place", backed with "That Place" was recorded with a pickup group billed as the Turn-Keys, featuring Ira Raibon of the Fabulous Souls playing saxophone. The initial release of "Some Place" in November 2010 was on Waterhouse's own 'Pres' imprint. The single was recorded, mixed, and mastered completely analog to lacquer, plated and hand-pressed. The labels were handset letterpress printed. Copies of "Some Place" sell for as much as $300.

On the strength of the self-distributed single, Waterhouse assembled a backing group, The Tarots, as well as taking on a trio of female vocalists, The Naturelles. This line up coalesced in time for a debut performance in the last week of December 2010. His earliest performances were with artists such as Ty Segall, The Strange Boys, White Fence, and most frequently, The Allah-Las. He signed with Innovative Leisure Records in March 2011. He relocated from San Francisco to Los Angeles in 2012, and began touring North America and Europe, as well as working as producer on the Allah-Las 2012 self-titled debut.

In May 2012, his debut 11-song album, Time's All Gone, was released on Innovative Leisure Records.

Waterhouse toured North America and Europe with the Allah-Las through 2012 in support of Time's All Gone. Another European tour in Spring 2013 found him playing Germany, France, Belgium, Netherlands, Switzerland, Spain (with an appearance at the Primavera Sound Festival, and the UK. He continued his production work on the Allah-Las' sophomore release "Worship The Sun", released in 2014.

His second LP, Holly, was issued in March 2014 by Innovative Leisure Records with 10 songs, with his third studio album Never Twice released on September 30, 2016 also with 10 songs. His song Katchi from Never Twice was remixed by the French duo Ofenbach in 2017 and reached number one in the French chart. During these years Waterhouse continued to tour tirelessly around the world performing in Tokyo, across Europe and the United States.

In January 2018, Nick Waterhouse entered the studio to begin recording his fourth studio album. On January 9, 2019, it was confirmed that his new self-titled 11-song album would release on March 8, 2019.

Released during the pandemic, Live At Pappy & Harriet's: In Person From The High Desert a double LP came out in July 2020, with his fifth studio album, Promenade Blue releasing on April 9, 2021 with 11 songs.

In 2021 won the Album of The Year Grammy as a producer for We Are, by Jon Batiste. Waterhouse is a longtime collaborator with Batiste, a relationship dating back to Waterhouse’s Time’s All Gone. Waterhouse has produced and played on Christmas With Jon Batiste, World Music Radio, the Marlowe original soundtrack, and Big Money.

Waterhouse has collaborated not only with Jon Batiste, but Leon Bridges, Lana Del Rey, Thee Midniters Little Willie G, Ty Segall, Ural Thomas, Allah-las, Aaron Frazier, Nathaniel Ratliff, Mayer Hawthorne, and produced remixes for Manchester Orchestra, Local Natives, and others.

By 2022 Waterhouse had released two more 45s, with B.Santa Ana backed with a fan favourite cover of The Seed's Pushing Too Hard (featuring Little Willie G of Thee Midniters) and Monterey/Straight Love Affair. Spring 2023 saw the release of Waterhouse's sixth studio album, The Fooler, to critical acclaim.

Continuing with production work, Waterhouse produced on the 2024 Grammy-nominated album World Music Radio, Lana Del Rey’s Did You Know There Is A Tunnel Under Ocean Boulevard, and guitarist and producer on Candy Necklace, nominated for best pop duo/group performance.

In 2025, continuing collaboration with Jon Batiste, he produced, wrote and performed on Big Money. “Big Money” was the winner of the 2025 Grammy Award for Best Americana Album. Waterhouse accepted the award at the 68th Annual Grammy Awards.

== Discography ==
=== Albums ===
- Time's All Gone – Innovative Leisure 2005, 2012
  - "Say, I Wanna Know"
  - "Some Place"
  - "Don't You Forget It"
  - "I Can Only Give You Everything"
  - "Raina"
  - "(If) You Want Trouble"
  - "Indian Love Call"
  - "Is That Clear"
  - "Teardrop Will Follow You"
  - "Time's All Gone, Pt. 1"
  - "Time's All Gone, Pt. 2" (instrumental)
- Holly – IL 2017, 2014
  - "High Tiding"
  - "This Is A Game"
  - "It #3"
  - "Let It Come Down"
  - "Sleepin' Pills"
  - "Holly"
  - "Dead Room"
  - "Well It's Fine"
  - "Ain't There Something That Money Can't Buy"
  - "Hands On The Clock"
- Never Twice – IL 2037, 2016
  - "It's Time"
  - "I Had Some Money (But I Spent It)"
  - "Straight Love Affair"
  - "Stanyan Street"
  - "The Old Place"
  - "Katchi" (with Leon Bridges)
  - "Baby, I'm In The Mood For You"
  - "Tracy"
  - "Lucky Once" (instrumental)
  - "LA Turnaround"
- Nick Waterhouse – IL 2060, 2019
  - "By Heart"
  - "Song For Winners"
  - "I Feel An Urge Coming On"
  - "Undedicated"
  - "Black Glass"
  - "Wreck The Rod"
  - "Which Was Writ"
  - "Man Leaves Town"
  - "Thought & Act"
  - "El Viv"
  - "Wherever She Goes (She Is Wanted)"
- Live At Pappy and Harriet's / In Person From The High Desert – IL 2075, 2020
  - "Some Place"
  - "Straight Love Affair"
  - "It's Time"
  - "LA Turnaround"
  - "Black Glass"
  - "Don't You Forget It"
  - "Raina"
  - "El Viv"
  - "Say, I Wanna Know"
  - "Wreck The Rod"
  - "Katchi"
  - "I Feel An Urge Coming On"
  - "Dead Room"
  - "Pushing Too Hard"
  - "Sleeping Pills"
  - Medley: "(If) You Want Trouble"/"This Is A Game"/"Some Place (Reprise)"
- Promenade Blue – IL 2078, 2021
  - "Place Names"
  - "The Spanish Look"
  - "Vincentine"
  - "Medicine"
  - "Very Blue"
  - "Silver Bracelet"
  - "Promène Bleu"
  - "Fugitive Lover"
  - "Minor Time"
  - "B. Santa Ana. 1986"
  - "To Tell"
- The Fooler – IL 2100; Pres 8001, 2023
  - "Looking For A Place"
  - "Hide And Seek"
  - "(No) Commitment"
  - "Play To Win"
  - "Was It You"
  - "Later In The Garden"
  - "The Problem With A Street"
  - "Plan For Leaving"
  - "(Are You) Hurting"
  - "It Was The Style"
  - "The Fooler"
  - "Unreal, Immaterial"

=== Singles and EPs ===
- "Some Place" (with The Turn-Keys) b/w The Turn-Keys (featuring Ira Raibon-tenor sax): "That Place" (instrumental) – Pres 45-801, 2010
- "Is That Clear" b/w "I Can Only Give You Everything" – Innovative Leisure 1015, 2011
- "Don't You Forget It" ('Record Store Day' split release with the Allah-Las) – IL 1025, 2012
- "Say, I Wanna Know" b/w "(If) You Want Trouble" – IL 1033, 2012
- "Raina" b/w "Don't You Forget It" – IL 1040, 2013
- "This Is A Game" b/w "It #3" – IL 1065, 2014; Pres 45-803, 2014
- "Smooth Operator" [no B-side] – IL [no number], 2016
- "It's Time" b/w "Katchi" (with Leon Bridges) – IL 2037, 2016
- "Old Place, Pt. 1" b/w/ "Old Place, Pt. 2" – IL 1129, 2016
- "LA Turnaround" b/w Nick & Brit: "I Cry" – IL 1179, 2017
- "Song For Winners" [no B-side] – IL 2060, 2019
- "I Feel An Urge Coming On" b/w "I'm Due (For A Heartache)" – IL 1253, 2019
- "Strike" b/w "Reelin'" (both with Late Slip) – Soul Step 075, 2021
- "B. Santa Ana, 1986" b/w "Pushing Too Hard" – IL 1298, 2021
- "Monterey" b/w "Straight Love Affair" – IL 1299, 2022

=== Musician credits ===
- Roberta Freeman - backing vocals
- Carol Hatchett - backing vocals
- Brit Manor - backing vocals

=== Production credits ===
- Allah-Las – "Catamaran" (single) – Pres 45-802, 2010
- Allah-Las – "Tell Me (What's On Your Mind)" (single) – Innovative Leisure, 2012
- Allah-Las – Allah-Las (LP) – IL, 2012
- Allah-Las – "501-415" (single) – IL, 2014
- Allah-Las – Worship The Sun (LP) – IL, 2014
- Ural Thomas And The Pain – "Pain Is The Name Of Your Game" (single) – Pres 45-805, 2015
- Paul Bergmann – "Summer's End" (single) – Fairfax, 2015
- Orquestra B.A. – "One And Only" (single) – Pres 45-804, 2016
- Jon Batiste – Christmas With Jon Batiste (LP), 2016
- Ural Thomas And The Pain – Ural Thomas And The Pain (LP) – Mississippi Records MRP-096, 2016
- Ural Thomas And The Pain – "My Sweet Rosie" (single) – Tender Loving Empire TLE-076, 2018
- Jon Batiste – "Tell The Truth" (track on LP) – Verve Records, 2021
- Lana Del Rey – Did You Know That There's A Tunnel Under Ocean Blvd (LP) – Polydor/Interscope Records, 2023
- Lana Del Rey – "Candy Necklace" (single) – Polydor/Interscope Records, 2023
- The Loved Ones – “Vagabond” (single) – LO Records LOR-001, 2025
- Jon Batiste - “Big Money” (LP) - Verve/Interscope Records, 2025
