= Rooky Ricardo's Records =

Record Store

Rooky Ricardo's Records is a record store in the Lower Haight district of San Francisco, California, which features mainly soul music 45 rpm records. Dick Vivian, the sole proprietor and owner of Rooky Ricardo's, has been a mentor to other small business owners, such as Matt Osborne of |Glass Key Photo, and an inspiration to local musicians, including Nick Waterhouse, and disc jockeys in the San Francisco area for 25 years. It is considered one of the best record stores in the Bay Area.

In August 2025, an SFGate article announced that Dick Vivian was undergoing treatment for stage 3 pancreatic cancer, linking to a GoFundMe to aid with lifesaving treatment.
