= Nick Waterhouse (album) =

Studio album by Nick Waterhouse
- Released: March 8, 2019
- Length: 37:13
- Label: Innovative Leisure

Nick Waterhouse chronology
Never Twice (2016)	Nick Waterhouse (2019)

Professional ratings
Aggregate scores
Source	Rating
Metacritic	76/100
Review scores
Source	Rating
AllMusic	4/5 stars
American Songwriter	4/5 stars

Nick Waterhouse is the self-titled fourth studio album by American singer-songwriter Nick Waterhouse. It contains 11 tracks and it was released in March of 2019 under Innovative Leisure.

== Track listing ==
No.	Title	Length
1.	"By Heart"	4:03
2.	"Song for Winners"	3:00
3.	"I Feel an Urge Coming On"	3:20
4.	"Undedicated"	4:08
5.	"Black Glass"	3:28
6.	"Wreck the Rod"	2:43
7.	"Which Was Writ"	2:44
8.	"Man Leaves Town"	3:02
9.	"Thought & Act"	4:10
10.	"El Viv"	3:19
11.	"Wherever She Goes (She Is Wanted)"	3:16
