= Wasted Love (Ofenbach song) =

2021 Single by Ofenbach featuring Lagique

Single by Ofenbach featuring Lagique

from the album I
- Released: 8 January 2021
- Genre: Dance-pop; house
- Length: 2:19
- Label: Ofenbach Music; Warner Music
- Songwriters: César de Rummel; Dorian Lo; Haris Alagic; Jihad Rahmouni; Sophia Ayana
- Producer: Ofenbach

Ofenbach singles chronology
| "Head Shoulders Knees & Toes" (2020) | "Wasted Love" (2021) | "Hurricane" (2021) |

Music video
- "Wasted Love" on YouTube

"Wasted Love" is a song by French DJ duo Ofenbach featuring vocals by Lagique. It was released through Ofenbach Music and Warner Music on 8 January 2021.

== Music video ==
The music video was released on 8 January 2021. It is set at night on the rainy streets of Kyiv, with two people in love trying to find one another.

== Track listing ==
Digital download
| No. | Title | Length |
|---|---|---|
| 1. | "Wasted Love" | 2:19 |

== Charts ==
=== Weekly charts ===
Weekly chartperformance for "Wasted Love"
| Chart (2021) | Peak position |
|---|---|
| Austria (Ö3 Austria Top 40) | 19 |
| Belgium (Ultratop 50 Flanders) | 18 |
| Belgium (Ultratop 50 Wallonia) | 4 |
| Czech Republic Airplay (ČNS IFPI) | 9 |
| France (SNEP) | 24 |
| Germany (GfK) | 12 |
| Global 200 (Billboard) | 169 |
| Hungary (Dance Top 40) | 14 |
| Hungary (Rádiós Top 40) | 8 |
| Hungary (Single Top 40) | 3 |
| Hungary (Stream Top 40) | 14 |
| Ireland (IRMA) | 86 |
| Italy (FIMI) | 65 |
| Lithuania (AGATA) | 89 |
| Netherlands (Dutch Top 40) | 8 |
| Netherlands (Single Top 100) | 23 |
| Poland (Polish Airplay Top 100) | 1 |
| Romania (Airplay 100) | 7 |
| Slovakia Airplay (ČNS IFPI) | 1 |
| Switzerland (Schweizer Hitparade) | 13 |
| UK Singles (OCC) | 84 |
| US Hot Dance/Electronic Songs (Billboard) | 15 |

=== Year-end charts ===
2021 year-end chart performance for "Wasted Love"
| Chart (2021) | Position |
|---|---|
| Austria (Ö3 Austria Top 40) | 41 |
| Belgium (Ultratop Flanders) | 37 |
| Belgium (Ultratop Wallonia) | 15 |
| France (SNEP) | 52 |
| Germany (Official German Charts) | 31 |
| Hungary (Dance Top 40) | 63 |
| Hungary (Rádiós Top 40) | 30 |
| Hungary (Single Top 40) | 14 |
| Hungary (Stream Top 40) | 26 |
| Netherlands (Dutch Top 40) | 36 |
| Netherlands (Single Top 100) | 74 |
| Poland (ZPAV) | 8 |
| Switzerland (Schweizer Hitparade) | 36 |
| US Hot Dance/Electronic Songs (Billboard) | 57 |

2022 year-end chart performance for "Wasted Love"
| Chart (2022) | Position |
|---|---|
| Belgium (Ultratop 50 Flanders) | 168 |
| Hungary (Dance Top 40) | 88 |
| Hungary (Rádiós Top 40) | 27 |

== Certifications ==
Certifications for "Wasted Love"
| Region | Certification | Certified units/sales |
|---|---|---|
| Austria (IFPI Austria) | Platinum | 30,000^{‡} |
| Canada (Music Canada) | Gold | 40,000^{‡} |
| Denmark (IFPI Danmark) | Gold | 45,000^{‡} |
| France (SNEP) | Diamond | 333,333^{‡} |
| Germany (BVMI) | Platinum | 400,000^{‡} |
| Italy (FIMI) | Platinum | 70,000^{‡} |
| Netherlands (NVPI) | Platinum | 80,000^{‡} |
| Poland (ZPAV) | Platinum | 50,000^{‡} |
| Portugal (AFP) | Gold | 5,000^{‡} |
| Spain (Promusicae) | Gold | 30,000^{‡} |
| United Kingdom (BPI) | Silver | 200,000^{‡} |
^{‡} Sales+streaming figures based on certification alone.
