= Overdrive (Ofenbach song) =

Single by Ofenbach featuring Norma Jean Martine
- Released: 6 October 2023
- Length: 2:35
- Label: Elektra France
- Songwriters: César de Rummel; Dorian Lauduique; Norma Jean Martine; Alexander Hauer; Marty Wilde; Ricky Wilde; Tobias Jundt
- Producers: Ofenbach; Jen Jis

Ofenbach singles chronology
| "On the Floor" (2023) | "Overdrive" (2023) |

Norma Jean Martine singles chronology
| "Coming Home" (2023) | "Overdrive" (2023) | "Throw Me Out the Club" (2023) |

Music video
- "Overdrive" on YouTube

"Overdrive" is a song by French DJ duo Ofenbach featuring American singer Norma Jean Martine. It was released on 6 October 2023 through Elektra France and marks their second collaboration, following "Head Shoulders Knees & Toes" (2020).

== Background and composition ==
Following the commercial success of "Head Shoulders Knees & Toes" in 2020, the duo and Martine came together for a second time to work on more music. "Overdrive" prominently samples "Ma Baker" (1977) by Boney M. and "Cambodia" (1981) by Kim Wilde. The original melody was slightly revamped and sped-up by the duo, making the final song sound "brighter" and "more energetic" than the original. Making of the song was partially uploaded to TikTok ahead of the release.

Talking about the sample choice, César de Rummel revealed that Dorian Lauduique has always been a big fan of the song and proposed to do a cover version one day. De Rummel agreed but intended to "do something different with it", which eventually led to the collaboration with Martine.

== Music video ==
An accompanying music video was shot in November 2023 and first teased by the duo on their social media on 13 November. This music video is out since January 2024. It has already reached 63 million views.

== Charts ==
=== Weekly charts ===
Weekly chart performance for "Overdrive"
| Chart (2023–2024) | Peak position |
|---|---|
| Austria (Ö3 Austria Top 40) | 6 |
| Belarus Airplay (TopHit) | 4 |
| Belgium (Ultratop 50 Flanders) | 7 |
| Belgium (Ultratop 50 Wallonia) | 3 |
| Bulgaria Airplay (PROPHON) | 1 |
| CIS Airplay (TopHit) | 3 |
| Croatia International Airplay (Top lista) | 1 |
| Czech Republic Airplay (ČNS IFPI) | 1 |
| Czech Republic Singles Digital (ČNS IFPI) | 8 |
| Estonia Airplay (TopHit) | 1 |
| France (SNEP) | 18 |
| Germany (GfK) | 5 |
| Global 200 (Billboard) | 190 |
| Greece International (IFPI) | 34 |
| Hungary (Dance Top 40) | 2 |
| Hungary (Rádiós Top 40) | 1 |
| Hungary (Single Top 40) | 20 |
| Kazakhstan Airplay (TopHit) | 8 |
| Latvia Airplay (LaIPA) | 3 |
| Lithuania (AGATA) | 37 |
| Lithuania Airplay (TopHit) | 11 |
| Luxembourg (Billboard) | 10 |
| Moldova Airplay (TopHit) | 2 |
| Netherlands (Dutch Top 40) | 2 |
| Netherlands (Single Top 100) | 9 |
| Poland (Polish Airplay Top 100) | 1 |
| Poland (Polish Streaming Top 100) | 12 |
| Portugal (AFP) | 186 |
| Romania Airplay (Media Forest) | 2 |
| Romania TV Airplay (Media Forest) | 6 |
| Russia Airplay (TopHit) | 4 |
| Serbia Airplay (Radiomonitor) | 9 |
| Slovakia Airplay (ČNS IFPI) | 1 |
| Slovakia Singles Digital (ČNS IFPI) | 2 |
| Sweden (Sverigetopplistan) | 80 |
| Switzerland (Schweizer Hitparade) | 8 |
| Ukraine Airplay (TopHit) | 9 |
| US Hot Dance/Electronic Songs (Billboard) | 41 |

=== Monthly charts ===
Monthly chart performance for "Overdrive"
| Chart (2023–2024) | Peak position |
|---|---|
| Belarus Airplay (TopHit) | 4 |
| CIS Airplay (TopHit) | 4 |
| Czech Republic (Rádio – Top 100) | 2 |
| Czech Republic (Singles Digitál – Top 100) | 10 |
| Estonia Airplay (TopHit) | 2 |
| Kazakhstan Airplay (TopHit) | 10 |
| Lithuania Airplay (TopHit) | 10 |
| Moldova Airplay (TopHit) | 6 |
| Romania Airplay (TopHit) | 10 |
| Russia Airplay (TopHit) | 6 |
| Slovakia (Rádio – Top 100) | 1 |
| Slovakia (Singles Digitál – Top 100) | 3 |
| Ukraine Airplay (TopHit) | 9 |

=== Year-end charts ===
2023 year-end chart performance for "Overdrive"
| Chart (2023) | Position |
|---|---|
| CIS Airplay (TopHit) | 124 |
| Netherlands (Dutch Top 40) | 65 |
| Poland (Polish Airplay Top 100) | 56 |
| Russia Airplay (TopHit) | 132 |

2024 year-end chart performance for "Overdrive"
| Chart (2024) | Position |
|---|---|
| Austria (Ö3 Austria Top 40) | 28 |
| Belarus Airplay (TopHit) | 3 |
| Belgium (Ultratop 50 Flanders) | 15 |
| Belgium (Ultratop 50 Wallonia) | 15 |
| Bulgaria Airplay (PROPHON) | 3 |
| CIS Airplay (TopHit) | 10 |
| Estonia Airplay (TopHit) | 4 |
| France (SNEP) | 55 |
| Germany (GfK) | 10 |
| Hungary (Dance Top 40) | 7 |
| Hungary (Rádiós Top 40) | 11 |
| Hungary (Single Top 40) | 37 |
| Kazakhstan Airplay (TopHit) | 27 |
| Lithuania Airplay (TopHit) | 13 |
| Moldova Airplay (TopHit) | 83 |
| Netherlands (Dutch Top 40) | 18 |
| Netherlands (Single Top 100) | 28 |
| Poland (Polish Airplay Top 100) | 15 |
| Poland (Polish Streaming Top 100) | 40 |
| Russia Airplay (TopHit) | 53 |
| Switzerland (Schweizer Hitparade) | 15 |

2025 year-end chart performance for "Overdrive"
| Chart (2025) | Position |
|---|---|
| Belarus Airplay (TopHit) | 60 |
| Belgium (Ultratop 50 Flanders) | 161 |
| CIS Airplay (TopHit) | 115 |
| Hungary (Dance Top 40) | 11 |
| Hungary (Rádiós Top 40) | 21 |
| Lithuania Airplay (TopHit) | 161 |
| Moldova Airplay (TopHit) | 106 |
| Poland (Polish Airplay Top 100) | 74 |

== Certifications ==
Certifications for "Overdrive"
| Region | Certification | Certified units/sales |
|---|---|---|
| Austria (IFPI Austria) | Platinum | 30,000^{‡} |
| Denmark (IFPI Danmark) | Gold | 45,000^{‡} |
| France (SNEP) | Diamond | 333,333^{‡} |
| Germany (BVMI) | Gold | 300,000^{‡} |
| Italy (FIMI) | Gold | 50,000^{‡} |
| Netherlands (NVPI) | Platinum | 93,000^{‡} |
| Poland (ZPAV) | 4× Platinum | 200,000^{‡} |
| Spain (Promusicae) | Gold | 30,000^{‡} |
| Switzerland (IFPI Switzerland) | 2× Platinum | 60,000^{‡} |
| United Kingdom (BPI) | Silver | 200,000^{‡} |
^{‡} Sales+streaming figures based on certification alone.
