= Sabse Bada Rupaiya =

Sabse Bada Rupaiya (transl. Big Money) may refer to these Indian Hindi-language films:

- Sabse Bada Rupaiya (1955 film)
- Sabse Bada Rupaiya (1976 film)

== See also ==
- Big Money (disambiguation)
