= Be Mine (Ofenbach song) =

Single by Ofenbach
- Released: 25 November 2016
- Genre: Deep house; folktronica
- Length: 2:41
- Label: Elektra France; WMG
- Songwriters: César Laurent de Rumel; Dorian Lauduique; Gabriella West
- Producer: Ofenbach

Ofenbach singles chronology
"Be Mine" (2016)	"Katchi" (2017)

Music video
- "Be Mine" on YouTube

"Be Mine" is a song by French DJ duo Ofenbach. The song has peaked at number five on the French Singles Chart and reached the top 10 in nine other countries. A remixes EP featuring remixes from Agrume, Antiyu and Stone Van Brooken was released. The song was certified diamond by SNEP.

== Music video ==
The music video featured Ofenbach tied to a chair, tortured, abused and controlled by a 'visibly fierce' woman (Johanna Bros). Near the end, both members untie themselves and seducing the woman back, only for them to murder her and escape the place.

== Track listing ==
Single
No.	Title	Length
1.	"Be Mine"	2:41

Remixes (EP)
No.	Title	Length
1.	"Be Mine" (extended mix)	4:03
2.	"Be Mine" (Agrume Remix)	3:47
3.	"Be Mine" (Agrume Dub Remix)	5:42
4.	"Be Mine" (Antiyu Remix)	4:05
5.	"Be Mine" (Stone Van Brooken Remix) (radio edit)	3:42
6.	"Be Mine" (Stone Van Brooken Remix) (extended)	5:15
Total length:		26:34

== Charts ==
=== Weekly charts ===
Chart (2017)	Peak position
Austria (Ö3 Austria Top 40)	4
Belarus Airplay (Eurofest)	3
Belgium (Ultratop 50 Flanders)	38
Belgium (Ultratop 50 Wallonia)	15
Canada Hot 100 (Billboard)	97
CIS Airplay (TopHit)	1
Czech Republic Airplay (ČNS IFPI)	1
Czech Republic Singles Digital (ČNS IFPI)	14
France (SNEP)	7
Germany (GfK)	11
Hungary (Dance Top 40)	27
Hungary (Single Top 40)	20
Italy (FIMI)	7
Mexico (Monitor Latino)	9
Mexico Airplay (Billboard)	2
Poland Airplay (ZPAV)	3
Poland Dance (ZPAV)	1
Portugal (AFP)	79
Romania (Airplay 100)	17
Serbia (Radiomonitor)	1
Slovakia Airplay (ČNS IFPI)	6
Slovakia Singles Digital (ČNS IFPI)	24
Slovenia (SloTop50)	5
Spain (Promusicae)	30
Sweden (Sverigetopplistan)	97
Switzerland (Schweizer Hitparade)	6
US Dance Airplay (Billboard)	22

=== Year-end charts ===
Chart (2017)	Position
Austria (Ö3 Austria Top 40)	17
Belgium (Ultratop Wallonia)	59
CIS Airplay (Tophit)	6
France (SNEP)	11
Germany (Official German Charts)	26
Hungary (Dance Top 40)	88
Italy (FIMI)	20
Latvia Airplay (LaIPA)	9
Poland Airplay (ZPAV)	4
Russia Airplay (Tophit)	4
Slovenia (SloTop50)	15
Switzerland (Schweizer Hitparade)	19
Ukraine Airplay (Tophit)	73

Chart (2018)	Position
France (SNEP)	183

2024 year-end chart performance for "Be Mine"
Chart (2024)	Position
Belarus Airplay (TopHit)	191

== Certifications ==
Region	Certification	Certified units/sales
Austria (IFPI Austria)	Platinum	30,000^{‡}
Belgium (BRMA)	Gold	10,000^{‡}
Canada (Music Canada)	Platinum	80,000^{‡}
France (SNEP)	Diamond	233,333^{‡}
Germany (BVMI)	3× Gold	600,000^{‡}
Italy (FIMI)	4× Platinum	200,000^{‡}
New Zealand (RMNZ)	Gold	15,000^{‡}
Poland (ZPAV)	3× Platinum	150,000^{‡}
Portugal (AFP)	Gold	5,000^{‡}
Spain (Promusicae)	Gold	30,000^{‡}
Switzerland (IFPI Switzerland)	2× Platinum	60,000^{‡}
^{‡} Sales+streaming figures based on certification alone.
