= Katchi (song) =

Single by Ofenbach vs. Nick Waterhouse
- Released: 25 August 2017
- Length: 2:31
- Label: Warner Music Group
- Songwriters: Leon Bridges; Nick Waterhouse
- Producer: Ofenbach

Ofenbach singles chronology
"Be Mine" (2016)	"Katchi" (2017)	"Party" (2018)

Music video
- "Katchi" on YouTube

"Katchi" is a song by French DJ duo Ofenbach with vocals by Nick Waterhouse. It is a remix of Waterhouse's original song. It was released on 25 August 2017. The song peaked at No. 9 on the French Singles Chart.

== Charts ==
=== Weekly charts ===
Chart (2017–2018)	Peak position
Australia (ARIA)	54
Austria (Ö3 Austria Top 40)	5
Belarus Airplay (Eurofest)	2
Belgium (Ultratop 50 Wallonia)	12
Canada AC (Billboard)	21
Czech Republic Airplay (ČNS IFPI)	1
Czech Republic Singles Digital (ČNS IFPI)	9
France (SNEP)	9
Germany (GfK)	9
Hungary (Dance Top 40)	17
Hungary (Rádiós Top 40)	8
Hungary (Single Top 40)	6
Italy (FIMI)	19
Mexico Airplay (Billboard)	22
Poland Airplay (ZPAV)	5
Poland Dance (ZPAV)	1
Poland (Video Chart)	1
Portugal (AFP)	75
Romania (Airplay 100)	40
Russia (TopHit)	1
Serbia (Radiomonitor)	2
Slovakia Airplay (ČNS IFPI)	10
Slovenia (SloTop50)	3
Spain (Promusicae)	24
Switzerland (Schweizer Hitparade)	6
Venezuela (National-Report)	85

=== Year-end charts ===
Chart (2017)	Position
France (SNEP)	118
Poland (ZPAV)	38
Switzerland (Schweizer Hitparade)	84

Chart (2018)	Position
Austria (Ö3 Austria Top 40)	61
France (SNEP)	63
Germany (Official German Charts)	46
Hungary (Dance Top 40)	36
Hungary (Rádiós Top 40)	36
Hungary (Single Top 40)	38
Slovenia (SloTop50)	9
Switzerland (Schweizer Hitparade)	44

Chart (2019)	Position
Hungary (Rádiós Top 40)	25

=== Decade-end charts ===
2010s decade-end chart performance for "Katchi"
Chart (2010–2019)	Position
Ukrainian Airplay (TopHit)	173

== Certifications ==
Region	Certification	Certified units/sales
Austria (IFPI Austria)	Platinum	30,000^{‡}
Canada (Music Canada)	Gold	40,000^{‡}
France (SNEP)	Diamond	233,333^{‡}
Germany (BVMI)	Platinum	400,000^{‡}
Italy (FIMI)	2× Platinum	100,000^{‡}
Poland (ZPAV)	3× Platinum	60,000^{‡}
Spain (Promusicae)	Gold	30,000^{‡}
Switzerland (IFPI Switzerland)	Platinum	20,000^{‡}
^{‡} Sales+streaming figures based on certification alone.
