= Story of Me =

2018 studio album by Megan McKenna

Studio album by Megan McKenna
- Released: 7 December 2018
- Genre: Country; pop
- Length: 36:50
- Label: FrtyFve

Megan McKenna chronology
High Heeled Shoes (2017)	Story of Me (2018)

Singles from Story of Me
- 1. "High Heeled Shoes" Released: 6 September 2017; 2. "History" Released: 20 March 2018; 3. "Everything but You" Released: 13 July 2018

Story of Me is the debut studio album by English singer Megan McKenna, released on 7 December 2018 through FrtyFve. The album was preceded by three singles; "High Heeled Shoes", "History" and "Everything but You". The album peaked at number four on the UK Country Chart.

== Singles ==
The lead single from Story of Me, "High Heeled Shoes", was released on 6 September 2017, after the third and final episode of her reality series, There's Something About Megan. The single was accompanied by "Far Cry from Love", as part of an EP. The two songs topped the UK iTunes chart, just 24 hours after their release. The song reached number 43 on the UK Singles Chart, with "Far Cry from Love" reaching number 53. A music video directed by Oliver Prout was released on McKenna's YouTube channel on 20 September 2017. The second single, "History", was released on 20 March 2018. The third single, "Everything But You" was released shortly afterwards on 13 July 2018. In October 2019, McKenna began competing in The X Factor: Celebrity, and for her audition, she performed "Everything but You".

== Track listing ==
No.	Title	Writer(s)	Length
1.	"Odds"	Eric Olson; Lauren Alaina; April Geesbreght	3:46
2.	"Paperboy"	Amy Wadge; Jon Maguire; Catherine McGrath	3:38
3.	"Everything but You"	Megan McKenna; Wadge	3:19
4.	"History"	Phil Cook; Chelcee Grimes	3:27
5.	"Story of Me"	McKenna; Wadge	4:24
6.	"How Many Times"	McKenna; Wadge	3:53
7.	"Far Cry from Love"	McKenna; Beth Nielsen Chapman	4:10
8.	"If You"	McKenna; Wadge	3:34
9.	"Headline"	Ben Goldsmith; Tori Tullier; Alana Springsteen	3:12
10.	"High Heeled Shoes"	Norma Jean Martine; Nick Southwood; Catherine McGrath	3:27
Total length:			36:50

== Charts ==
Chart (2018)	Peak position
UK Country Albums (OCC)	4
UK Album Downloads (OCC)	28

== Release history ==
List of release dates, showing country, format, label and references
Country	Date	Format	Label	Ref.
United Kingdom	7 December 2018	Digital download, Streaming	frtyfve	
United Kingdom	6 December 2019	CD	frtyfve, Absolute	
