= Big Money =

Big Money or The Big Money may refer to:

== Films ==
- Big Money (film), 1930
- The Big Money (film), 1958
- Sabse Bada Rupaiya (disambiguation) (transl. Big Money), Indian films

== Literature ==
- Big Money (novel), by P. G. Wodehouse (1931)
- Big Money, a novel by John Dos Passos, part of his U.S.A. trilogy
- "Big Money", a storyline in the science fiction comedy webtoon series Live with Yourself!

== Music ==
- "Big Money" (Game song), a 2011 song by Game from The R.E.D. Album
- "The Big Money", a 1985 song by Rush
- "Big Money", a 1994 song by Marc Ribot from Shrek
- "Big Money", a 1986 song by Big Black from Atomizer

== Other uses ==
- Big Money!, a 2002 video game
- "Big Money" (Happy Days), a 1974 television episode
- Big Money: Chota Parda Bada Game, a 2008 Indian reality game show hosted by R. Madhavan
