= Ofenbach =

French DJ duo

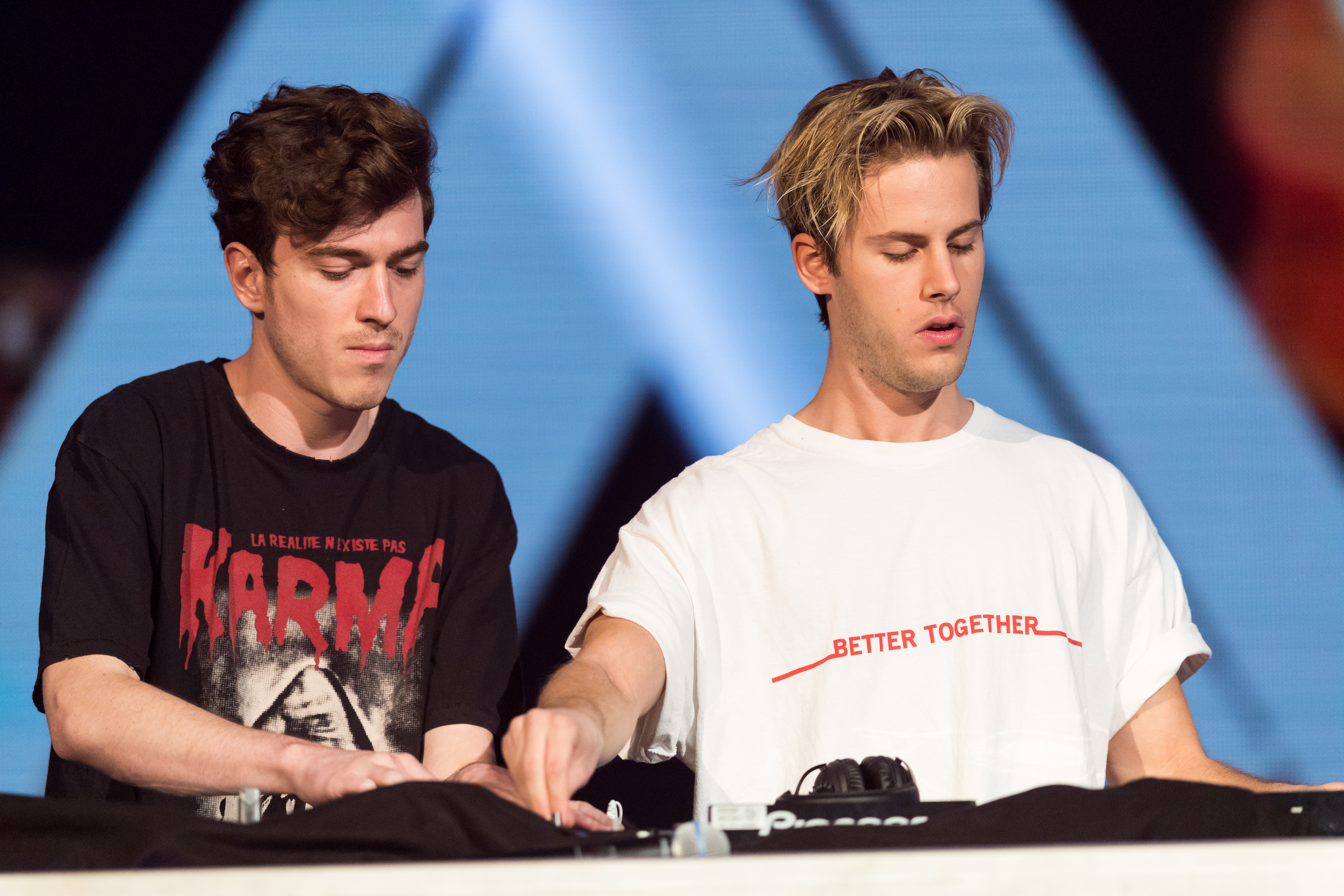
- Ofenbach in 2018

Background information
- Origin: Paris, France
- Genre: Electronic music
- Years active: 2014–present
- Label: WEA Warner Music France
- Members: Dorian Lauduique; César de Rummel
- Website: weareofenbach.com

Ofenbach is a French DJ duo founded in 2014, consisting of Dorian Lauduique and César de Rummel and based in Paris. Their gold-certified song "Be Mine" charted on the Billboard Dance/Mix Show Airplay reached number 35. After releasing songs like "Around the Fire" and "You Don't Know Me", they gained support from artists such as Robin Schulz and Tiësto. They are also known for remixing songs from Bob Sinclar, Hyphen Hyphen, and James Bay.

== History ==
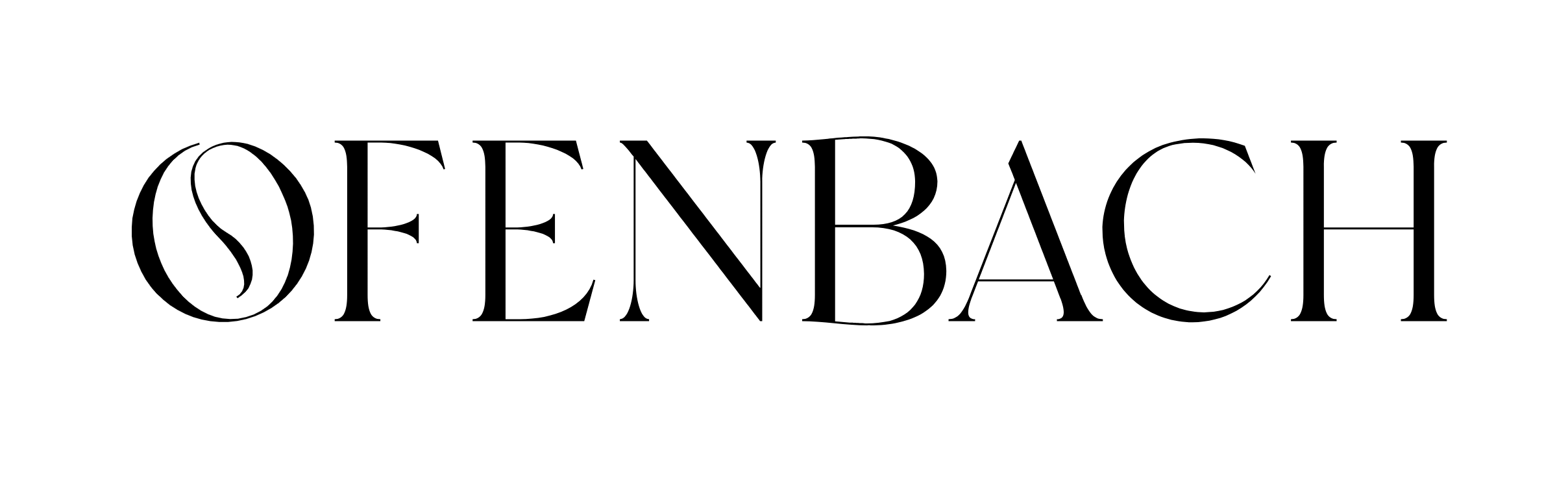
Logo of Ofenbach

The duo met at school at an early age. When they were 13 years old, Lo's father told them that one of the best experiences of his life was being part of a band. This inspired them to form their first musical group in which they performed rock music. They cite some of their influences as Supertramp, The Rolling Stones, and Led Zeppelin.

The name Ofenbach was selected after the duo found a score by French composer Jacques Offenbach at their home.

Ofenbach released their single "Be Mine" alongside an official remix package via Warner Music France/Big Beat, which featured remixes from Agrume, Antiyu, and Stone Van Brooken. The song peaked at number one in Russia and Poland. And also, they have performed at 2018 UEFA Europa League Final opening ceremony in Lyon.

== Discography ==
=== Studio albums ===
Title	Details	Peak chart positions			Certifications
Title	Details	FRA	BEL (WA)	SWI	Certifications
I	Released: 4 November 2022; Label: Ofenbach Music, Warner/Elektra; Format: LP, digital download, streaming	61	140	93	SNEP: Platinum

=== Extended plays ===
Title	Details	Peak chart positions	Certifications
Title	Details	FRA	Certifications
Ofenbach	Released: 12 April 2019; Label: Ofenbach Music; Format: CD, LP, digital download, streaming	85	SNEP: Gold

=== Singles ===
Title	Year	Peak chart positions									Certifications	Album
Title	Year	FRA	AUT	BEL (WA)	CAN	GER	ITA	NLD	POL	SWI	Certifications	Album
"What I Want" (with Karlk)	2015	—	—	—	—	—	—	—	—	—		Non-album singles
"You Don't Know Me" (featuring Brodie Barclay)	2015	—	—	—	—	—	—	—	—	—		Non-album singles
"Be Mine"	2016	7	4	15	97	11	7	— (Note: "Be Mine" did not enter the Dutch Single Top 100, but peaked at number five on the Single Tip chart.)	3	6	SNEP: Diamond; BRMA: Gold; BVMI: 3× Gold; FIMI: 4× Platinum; IFPI AUT: Platinum; IFPI SWI: 2× Platinum; MC: Platinum; ZPAV: 3× Platinum	Non-album singles
"Katchi" (with Nick Waterhouse)	2017	9	5	12	—	9	19	—	5	6	SNEP: Diamond; BVMI: Platinum; FIMI: 2× Platinum; IFPI AUT: Platinum; IFPI SWI: Platinum; MC: Gold; ZPAV: 3× Platinum	Non-album singles
"Party" (vs. Lack of Afro featuring Wax and Herbal T)	2018	57	—	—	—	—	—	—	12	—		Non-album singles
"Paradise" (featuring Benjamin Ingrosso)	2018	36	—	8	—	—	—	—	9	—	SNEP: Platinum; ZPAV: Gold	Ofenbach
"Rock It"	2019	117	—	—	—	—	—	—	—	—	SNEP: Gold	Ofenbach
"Insane"	2019	—	—	—	—	—	—	—	—	—		Non-album single
"Head Shoulders Knees & Toes" (with Quarterhead featuring Norma Jean Martine)	2020	20	3	7	—	6	99	7	1	6	SNEP: Diamond; BRMA: Platinum; BVMI: 3× Gold; FIMI: Platinum; IFPI AUT: 3× Platinum; MC: Gold; ZPAV: 3× Platinum	I
"Wasted Love" (featuring Lagique)	2021	24	19	4	—	12	65	23	1	13	SNEP: Diamond; BVMI: Platinum; FIMI: Platinum; IFPI AUT: Platinum; MC: Gold; NVPI: Platinum; ZPAV: Platinum	I
"Call Me Papi" (with Feder featuring Dawty Music)	2021	179	—	—	—	—	—	—	—	—	SNEP: Gold	Non-album single
"Hurricane" (with Ella Henderson)	2021	58	—	18	—	—	—	43	4	—	SNEP: Diamond; IFPI AUT: Gold; ZPAV: Platinum	I
"4U"	2022	93	—	50	—	—	—	— (Note: "4U" did not enter the Dutch Single Top 100, but peaked at number 31 on the Airplay Top 50 chart.)	—	—	SNEP: Gold	I
"I Ain't Got No Worries" (with R3hab)	2022	—	—	—	—	—	—	—	—	—		I
"Love Me Now" (featuring Fast Boy)	2022	135	—	41	—	—	—	—	—	—	SNEP: Gold	I
"Body Talk" (featuring Svea)	2023	107	—	15	—	—	—	—	—	—	SNEP: Gold	Non-album singles
"Can't Forget You" (with James Carter featuring James Blunt)	2023	—	—	—	—	—	—	—	—	—		Non-album singles
"On the Floor" (with Hola)	2023	—	—	—	—	—	—	—	—	—		Non-album singles
"Overdrive" (featuring Norma Jean Martine)	2023	18	6	4	—	5	—	9	1	8	SNEP: Diamond; BVMI: Gold; FIMI: Gold; IFPI AUT: Platinum; IFPI SWI: 2× Platinum; NVPI: Platinum; ZPAV: 4× Platinum	Non-album singles
"Over You" (with Justin Jesso)	2024	—	—	—	—	—	—	—	—	—		Non-album singles
"Need You the Most"	2025	—	—	—	—	—	—	—	—	—		Non-album singles
"Miles Away"	2025	—	—	45	—	—	—	— (Note: "Miles Away" did not enter the Dutch Single Top 100, but peaked at number one on the Single Tip chart.)	26	—		Non-album singles
"Four to the Floor" (with Starsailor)	2026	51	—	35	—	—	—	—	9	—	SNEP: Gold	Non-album singles
"—" denotes a recording that did not chart or was not released in that territory.

=== Remixes ===
2014

- Miriam Makeba – "Pata Pata" ((Ofenbach Remix)
- Andreas Moe – "Under the Sun" (Ofenbach Remix)
- James Bay – "Hold Back the River" (Ofenbach Remix)

2015

- Lily & Madeleine – "Come to Me" (Ofenbach Remix)

2016

- Shem Thomas – "We Just Need a Little" (Ofenbach Remix)

2017

- James Blunt – "Love Me Better" (Ofenbach Remix)
- Portugal. The Man – "Feel It Still" (Ofenbach Remix)
- Rudimental featuring James Arthur – "Sun Comes Up" (Ofenbach Remix)

2018

- Clean Bandit featuring Demi Lovato – "Solo" (Ofenbach Remix)

2020

- Robin Schulz featuring Kiddo – "All We Got" (Ofenbach Remix)

2021

- Faouzia and John Legend – "Minefields" (Ofenbach Remix)
- Years & Years – "Starstruck" (Ofenbach Remix)
- Ed Sheeran – "Shivers" (Ofenbach Remix)
- Ofenbach and Ella Henderson – "Hurricane" (VIP Remix)
