= High Heeled Shoes (song) =

2017 song by Megan McKenna

Single by Megan McKenna

from the album Story of Me
- B-side: "Far Cry from Love"
- Released: 6 September 2017
- Recorded: 2016
- Genre: Country
- Length: 3:27
- Label: FrtyFve
- Songwriter(s): Norma Jean Martine; Catherine McGrath; Nick Southwood

Megan McKenna singles chronology
"High Heeled Shoes" (2017)	"History" (2018)

"High Heeled Shoes" is the debut single by English singer Megan McKenna. It was released through digital stores and streaming services on 6 September 2017, alongside its B-side, "Far Cry from Love". The song peaked at number 43 on the UK Singles Chart.

== Commercial performance ==
The song peaked at number one on iTunes in the United Kingdom, "Far Cry from Love" also peaked at number two, McKenna celebrated success on Twitter posting, "OMG I AM OVERWHELMED! I am Currently No. 1 & 2 on iTunes! Thankyou guys so so much! I love you all for believing in me". On 8 September 2017, the song entered the UK Singles Chart at number 43.

== Track listing ==
Digital download
No.	Title	Length
1.	"High Heeled Shoes"	3:27
2.	"Far Cry from Love"	4:10

== Charts ==
Chart (2017)	Peak position
Scotland (OCC)	6
UK Singles (OCC)	43

== Release history ==
Region	Date	Format	Label
United Kingdom	6 September 2017	Digital download; streaming	Instrumental
