= Head Shoulders Knees & Toes =

Single by Ofenbach and Quarterhead featuring Norma Jean Martine

Single by Ofenbach and Quarterhead featuring Norma Jean Martine

from the album I
- Released: 8 May 2020
- Genre: Electronic dance music
- Length: 2:37
- Label: Ofenbach Music; Spinnin'; Warner Music
- Songwriters: César de Rummel; Dorian Lo; Janik Riegert; Josh Tapen; Norma Jean Martine; Tim Deal
- Producer: Ofenbach Quarterhead

Ofenbach singles chronology
"We Can Hide Out" (2019)	"Head Shoulders Knees & Toes" (2020)	"Wasted Love" (2021)

Quarterhead singles chronology
"Candyshop" (2019)	"Head Shoulders Knees & Toes" (2020)

Norma Jean Martine singles chronology
"In My Arms" (2019)	"Head Shoulders Knees & Toes" (2020)	"Basketball" (2020)

Lyric videos
- "Head Shoulders Knees & Toes" on YouTube

"Head Shoulders Knees & Toes" is a song by French DJ duo Ofenbach and German DJ duo Quarterhead featuring vocals by American singer Norma Jean Martine. It was released through Ofenbach Music, Spinnin' Records, and Warner Music on 8 May 2020.

== Composition ==
Lyrically, the song is about "the feeling of being in love from head to toe" and is reminiscent of the children's song with the same name.

== Music video ==
The accompanying music video was released on 7 August 2020 was directed by Antoine Casanova. The clip features a nostalgic VHS-tinged filter.

== Charts ==
=== Weekly charts ===
Chart (2020–2021)	Peak position
Austria (Ö3 Austria Top 40)	3
Belgium (Ultratop 50 Flanders)	7
Belgium (Ultratop 50 Wallonia)	38
CIS Airplay (TopHit)	56
Czech Republic Airplay (ČNS IFPI)	2
Czech Republic Singles Digital (ČNS IFPI)	16
France (SNEP)	20
Germany (GfK)	6
Hungary (Dance Top 40)	21
Hungary (Rádiós Top 40)	11
Hungary (Single Top 40)	3
Hungary (Stream Top 40)	3
Ireland (IRMA)	62
Italy (FIMI)	99
Netherlands (Dutch Top 40)	4
Netherlands (Single Top 100)	7
Norway (VG-lista)	16
Poland Airplay (ZPAV)	1
Romania (Airplay 100)	1
Romania Airplay (Media Forest)	1
Romania TV Airplay (Media Forest)	1
Russia Airplay (TopHit)	87
Slovakia Airplay (ČNS IFPI)	1
Slovakia Singles Digital (ČNS IFPI)	19
Slovenia (SloTop50)	5
Sweden (Sverigetopplistan)	32
Switzerland (Schweizer Hitparade)	6
US Hot Dance/Electronic Songs (Billboard)	21

=== Year-end charts ===
Chart (2020)	Position
Austria (Ö3 Austria Top 40)	22
France (SNEP)	64
Germany (Official German Charts)	45
Netherlands (Dutch Top 40)	72
Poland (ZPAV)	22
Romania (Airplay 100)	39
Switzerland (Schweizer Hitparade)	42

Chart (2021)	Position
Austria (Ö3 Austria Top 40)	37
Belgium (Ultratop Flanders)	47
France (SNEP)	147
Germany (Official German Charts)	28
Hungary (Dance Top 40)	93
Hungary (Rádiós Top 40)	21
Hungary (Single Top 40)	50
Hungary (Stream Top 40)	21
Netherlands (Dutch Top 40)	92
Switzerland (Schweizer Hitparade)	34
US Hot Dance/Electronic Songs (Billboard)	96

== Certifications ==
Region	Certification	Certified units/sales
Austria (IFPI Austria)	3× Platinum	90,000^{‡}
Belgium (BRMA)	Platinum	40,000^{‡}
Canada (Music Canada)	Gold	40,000^{‡}
Denmark (IFPI Danmark)	Platinum	90,000^{‡}
France (SNEP)	Diamond	333,333^{‡}
Germany (BVMI)	3× Gold	600,000^{‡}
Italy (FIMI)	Platinum	70,000^{‡}
Poland (ZPAV)	3× Platinum	60,000^{‡}
^{‡} Sales+streaming figures based on certification alone.

== See also ==
- List of Airplay 100 number ones of the 2020s
