= Norma Jean Martine =

American singer

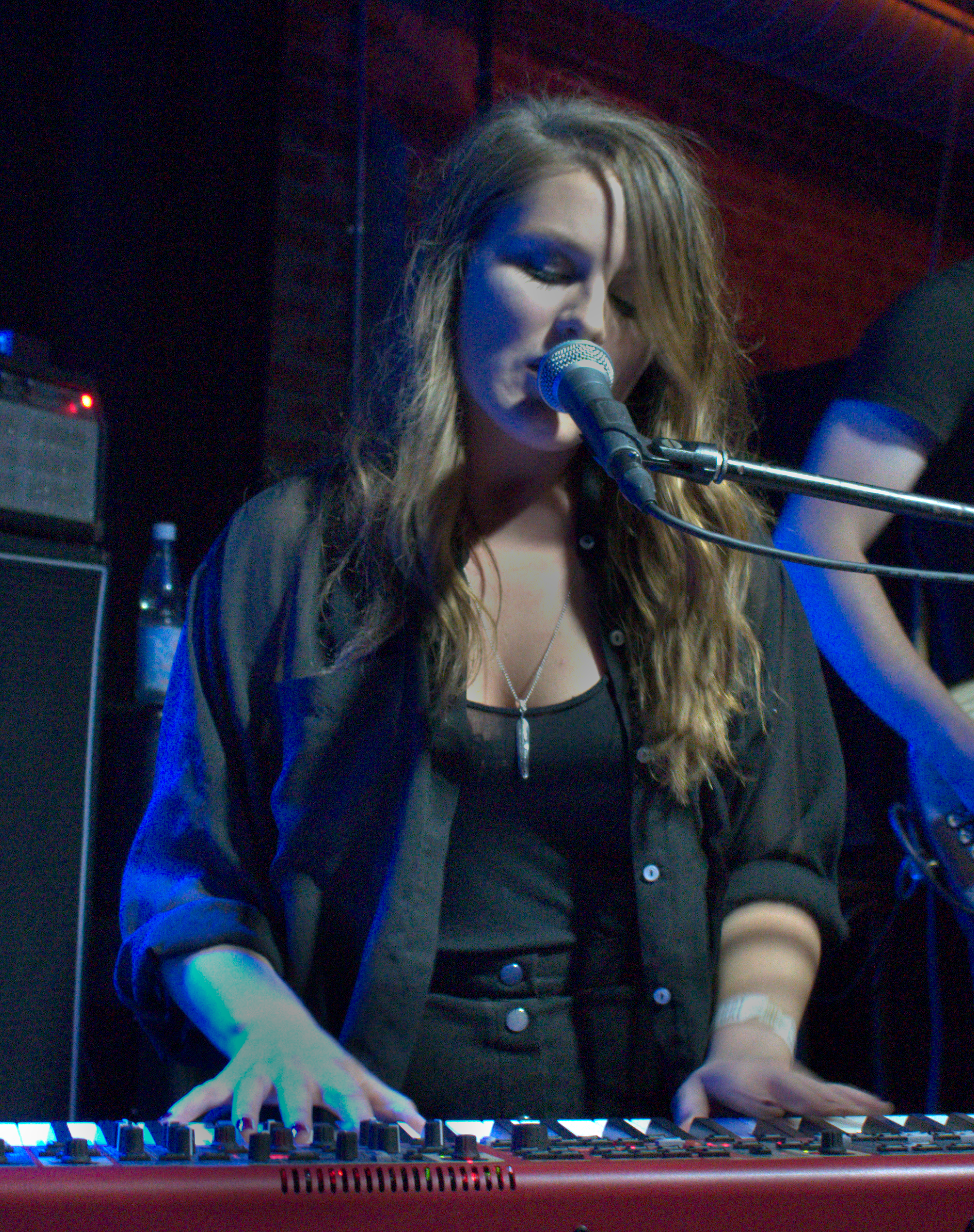

Background information
- Born: April 2, 1990 (age 36) Middletown, Orange County, New York, U.S.
- Genres: Pop
- Occupation: Singer
- Years active: 2013–present
- Labels: BMG Chrysalis Music USA; Universal Records Germany; Virgin EMI UK; Capitol/Vertigo Germany

Norma Jean Martine (born April 2, 1990) is an American singer, originally from Middletown, Orange County, New York, United States, but now based in London, England, who has written songs for artists including Giorgia, Michele Bravi, Lena, Marco Mengoni, Ronan Keating and Ashley Roberts. She is signed to BMG Chrysalis Music USA, and to Universal Records Germany/Virgin EMI UK.

== Life and career ==
Italian singer Giorgia’s top 10 hit "Quando Una Stella Muore" (in Italian) was co-written with Martine, featuring on her 2013 Italian number 1 double platinum album, Senza Paura (in Italian).

She co-wrote the single "In Bilico", which featured on 2013 Italian X Factor winner Michele Bravi’s debut top 10 album, A Passi Piccoli (in Italian), and "Lonely Nights (Hey You)" on former Pussycat Dolls, Ashley Roberts' 2014 album, Butterfly Effect.

In 2015, she co-wrote "In The Light" on Lena's German number 2 album, Crystal Sky and "Come Un Attimo Fa" on Marco Mengoni's Italian number 1 triple platinum album Parole in circolo and the track "Time Of My Life" as the iTunes bonus track. She featured on two tracks on Pablo Nouvelle's Heartbeat EP - "Heartbeat" and "The Best Thing".

As a solo performer she has played the Calling Festival, headlined by Stevie Wonder, in London in 2014, Latitude Festival, the Montreux Jazz Festival in 2013 and 2014, and supported Tom Odell, Gaz Coombes and Lissie. In December 2013, Brendan Benson invited her to perform at his charity concert for the David Lynch Foundation at the Ryman Auditorium, Nashville, Tennessee, alongside Jack White, Butch Walker and Jakob Dylan.

In 2014, her single "No Gold", was used as the CW Network fall trailer in the US and Fox 8's winter trailer in Australia. The single was also playlisted on Virgin Radio Italy without officially being released in the country.

In January 2015, she wrote with Burt Bacharach in Los Angeles. On October 2, 2015, she released her debut single "Animals", on Virgin EMI UK and Capitol/Vertigo Germany.

On January 29, 2016, Pablo Nouvelle released his album, All I Need, featuring two songs "We Ain't Dead Yet" and "Paint" which were co-written with, and sung by Norma Jean Martine.

Martine's second single "Freedom", a cover of George Michael's 1990 hit "Freedom! '90", was released on February 15, 2016. It featured in a multimillion-pound pan European advertising campaign for designer outlet chain, McArthurGlen.

Martine co-wrote the title track from Ronan Keating's album, Time Of My Life which was the highest new entry in the UK Albums Chart at No. 4 on 19 February 2016.

The 2016 Italian Eurovision entry, "No Degree Of Separation", performed by Francesca Michielin, was co-written by Martine. On May 20, 2016, Martine released her single "No Gold". On June 25, 2016, she premiered the song "I'm Still Here" with Burt Bacharach at the London Palladium. She co-wrote the song with Bacharach at his home in Los Angeles in 2015, and it also featured on her forthcoming album, Only In My Mind. Martine her next single, "I Want You To Want Me", on August 26, 2016; it featured in the British movie, Kids In Love, which stars Will Poulter, Cara Delevingne and Alma Jodorowsky. Her debut album Only In My Mind, produced by Danton Supple and containing 12 songs, was released in the United Kingdom on October 14, 2016.

== Discography ==
=== Albums ===
- Only In My Mind (October 2016)

=== Extended plays ===
- "Animals" (November 2015)

=== Singles ===
- "Freedom" (February 2016)
- "No Gold" (May 2016)
- "I Want You To Want Me" (October 2016)
- "Still In Love With You" (January 2017)

== Songwriting credits ==
Title	Year	Artist	Album	Label
"Quando Una Stella Muore"	2013	Giorgia	Senza Paura	Sony Italy
"In Bilico"	2014	Michele Bravi	A Passi Piccoli	Sony Italy
"Lonely Nights (Hey You)"	2014	Ashley Roberts	Butterfly Effect	Metropolis
"Heartbeat/Best Thing"	2014	Pablo Nouvelle	Heartbeat EP	PIAS
"Come Un Attimo Fa"	2015	Marco Mengoni	Parole In Circolo	Sony Italy
"In The Light"	2015	Lena	Crystal Sky	Universal Germany
"We Ain't Dead Yet/Paint"	2016	Pablo Nouvelle	All I Need	Armada Music
"Time Of My Life"	2016	Ronan Keating	Time of My Life	Decca
"No Degree Of Separation"	2016	Francesca Michielin		Sony Italy
"Glowing In The Dark"	2016	Graham Candy	Plan A	BMG Germany
"Ricorderai l'amore (Remember the Love)"	2016	Marco Mengoni feat. Grace Capristo		RCA Germany
"High Heeled aShoes"	2017	Megan McKenna	Story of Me	Frtyfive
"Head Shoulders Knees & Toes"	2020	Ofenbach	Single	Warner Electra France
"Overdrive"	2023	Ofenbach	Single	Warner Electra France
"Saturday Preacher"	2025	Cha Eun-woo	Else	Fatagio
