= Hurricane (Ofenbach and Ella Henderson song) =

2021 single by Ofenbach and Ella Henderson

Single by Ofenbach and Ella Henderson
- Released: 17 September 2021
- Genre: Dance-pop
- Length: 2:27
- Label: Elektra France
- Songwriters: César Laurent de Rummel; Dorian Lauduique; Janik Riegert; Josh Tapen; Marc Buhr
- Producers: Jen Jis; Ofenbach; Quarterhead

Ofenbach singles chronology
| "Call Me Papi" (2021) | "Hurricane" (2021) | "4U" (2022) |

Ella Henderson singles chronology
| "Risk It All" (2021) | "Hurricane" (2021) | "Brave" (2022) |

Music video
- "Hurricane" on YouTube

"Hurricane" is a song by French DJ duo Ofenbach and English singer-songwriter Ella Henderson. It was released through Elektra France on 17 September 2021.

== Background ==
In an Interview with Student Pocket Guide, the duo stated about the collaboration with Henderson: "We finished the first demo and sent it to Ella to check how she felt about it. It was during lockdown, so everything was done remotely then. When she sent us back her first try it was amazing. Since the track is powerful, her voice fit the vibe perfectly. It was a no brainer. She took it next level".

== Content ==
Shelby Pinckard of The Nocturnal Times described "Hurricane" as "a heart-wrenching love story in the form of an upbeat dance-pop track that is sure to capture the hearts of all who hear it". It is written in the key of D minor, with a tempo of 126 beats per minute.

== Track listing ==
Digital download and streaming
| No. | Title | Length |
|---|---|---|
| 1. | "Hurricane" (original) | 2:27 |
| 2. | "Hurricane" (extended version) | 3:50 |

== Charts ==
=== Weekly charts ===
Weekly chart performance for "Hurricane"
| Chart (2021–2022) | Peak position |
|---|---|
| Belgium (Ultratop 50 Flanders) | 31 |
| Belgium (Ultratop 50 Wallonia) | 18 |
| Croatia (HRT) | 9 |
| France (SNEP) | 58 |
| Hungary (Single Top 40) | 12 |
| Netherlands (Dutch Top 40) | 9 |
| Netherlands (Single Top 100) | 43 |
| Poland Airplay (ZPAV) | 4 |
| Slovakia Airplay (ČNS IFPI) | 1 |
| US Dance Airplay (Billboard) | 20 |

=== Year-end charts ===
2021 year-end chart performance for "Hurricane"
| Chart (2021) | Position |
|---|---|
| Netherlands (Dutch Top 40) | 79 |
| Poland (ZPAV) | 70 |

2022 year-end chart performance for "Hurricane"
| Chart (2022) | Position |
|---|---|
| Belgium (Ultratop Flanders) | 93 |
| Belgium (Ultratop Wallonia) | 82 |
| France (SNEP) | 171 |
| Netherlands (Dutch Top 40) | 48 |
| Poland (ZPAV) | 97 |

== Certifications ==
Certifications for "Hurricane"
| Region | Certification | Certified units/sales |
|---|---|---|
| Austria (IFPI Austria) | Gold | 15,000^{‡} |
| France (SNEP) | Diamond | 333,333^{‡} |
| Poland (ZPAV) | Platinum | 50,000^{‡} |
^{‡} Sales+streaming figures based on certification alone.
