= Megan McKenna =

English television personality and singer

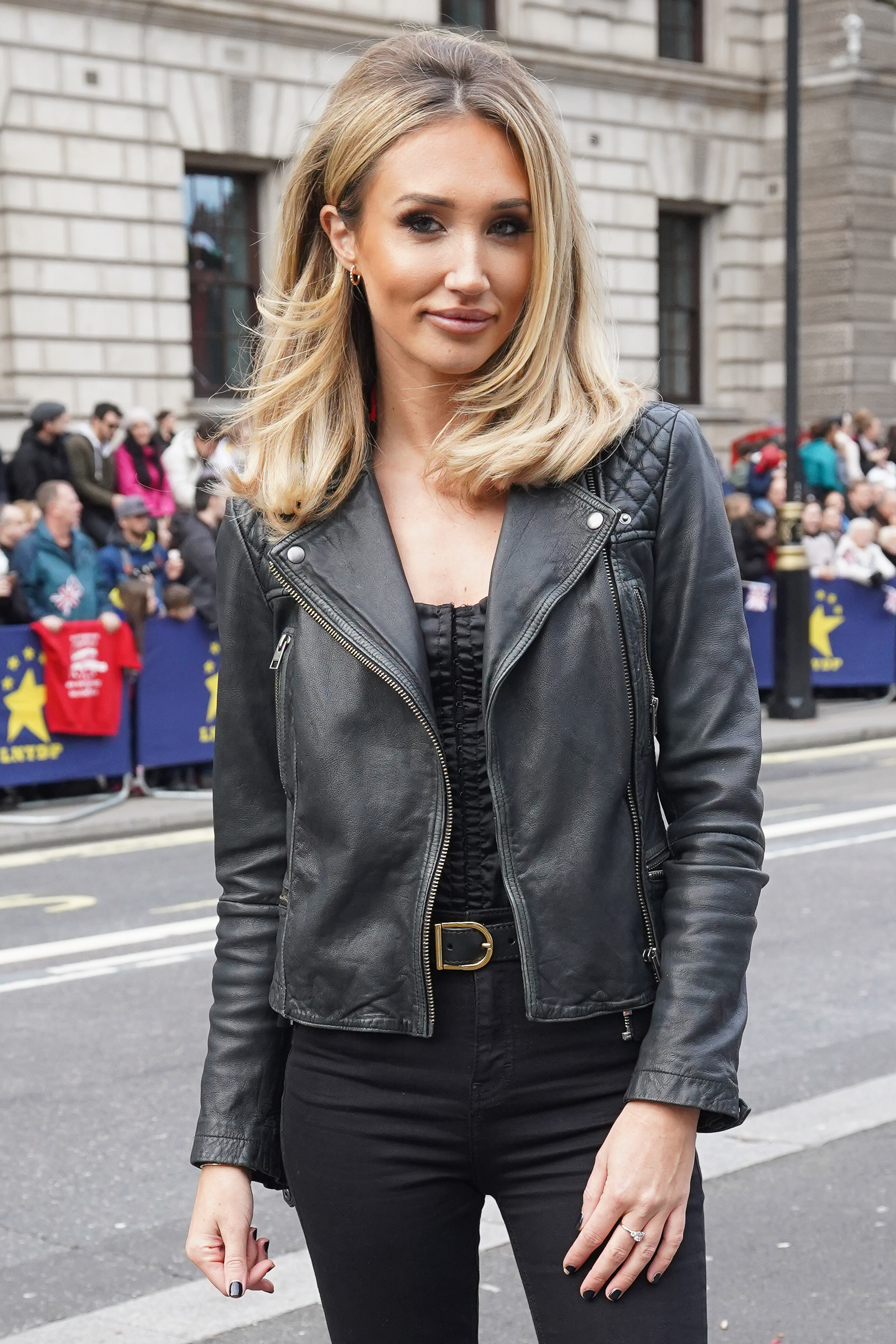
- McKenna in 2019
- Born: Megan Elizabeth McKenna; 26 September 1992 (age 34); Barking, London, England
- Education: Arts Educational Schools
- Occupations: Television personality; singer
- Years active: 2009–present
- Spouse: Oliver Burke (m. 2025)
- Children: 1
- Musical career
- Genres: Country; pop
- Instrument: Vocals
- Labels: FrtyFive; Syco

Megan Elizabeth McKenna (born 26 September 1992) is an English television personality and singer. After making appearances on Ex on the Beach (2015–2016), she received wider attention for appearing on Celebrity Big Brother (2016) and The Only Way Is Essex (2016–2017). McKenna then launched her music career, releasing her debut studio album, Story of Me (2018), and she later went on to win The X Factor: Celebrity (2019). Since her win, McKenna has continued to release music, competed in the BBC series Celebrity MasterChef (2021–2022) and released various books.

== Early and personal life ==
McKenna was born on 26 September 1992 in Barking, London. Her father's side of the family are of Irish descent. In her autobiography, Mouthy, McKenna revealed that she was bullied at school.

In 2016, McKenna revealed that she suffers from coeliac disease. In September 2023, McKenna suffered facial burns after "a freak accident" involving a jug of gravy.

In March 2016, she began dating The Only Way Is Essex cast member Pete Wicks, but the pair broke up in 2017. She got engaged to footballer Oliver Burke in June 2023 and the pair currently live in Germany. In October 2024, McKenna announced the birth of her first child with Burke. The pair got married in June 2025.

== Career ==
=== 2009–2019: Reality television and Story of Me ===
In 2009, McKenna reached the semi-finals of third series of Britain's Got Talent as part of the music duo Harmony. In the same year, she appeared in an advertisement for the second series of The Inbetweeners. McKenna appeared in an episode of The Only Way Is Essex in 2010, where she auditioned to be part of the girl group LOLA. As part of LOLA, she performed at T4 Stars of 2010. She also auditioned for The X Factor twice in 2014 and 2015, making it to bootcamp each time.

In 2015, McKenna appeared on the third series of MTV reality series Ex on the Beach. She returned to the programme for the fourth series, alongside Jordan Davies. She departed from Ex on the Beach early due to the death of her grandfather. She went on to become a housemate in the seventeenth series of Celebrity Big Brother in 2016. During her time in the house, she received a formal warning for using aggressive and threatening behaviour towards her fellow housemates. She was the fourth housemate to be evicted having received the fewest votes to save, spending a total of 18 days in the house. In March 2016, she joined The Only Way Is Essex as a full-time cast member. In May 2017, McKenna launched her own restaurant, "MCK Grill", in Woodford Green. Later in 2017, she released a range of hair extension pieces with Easilocks. McKenna made her final appearance on The Only Way Is Essex on 25 October 2017, expressing an interest in focusing on her music career.

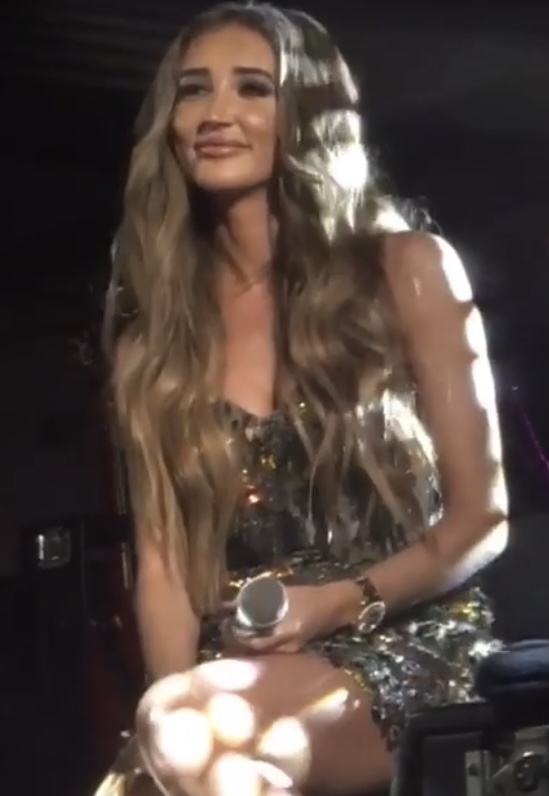
McKenna performing in 2017.

In 2017, McKenna starred in her own reality series, There's Something About Megan. The series focused on McKenna travelling to Nashville to begin a career in country music. The series consisted of three episodes, and aired on ITVBe. After the series finale, McKenna launched her music career, releasing her debut extended play, featuring "High Heeled Shoes" and "Far Cry from Love". The two songs topped the British iTunes chart within 24 hours of their release, and on the UK Singles Chart, "High Heeled Shoes" peaked at number 43, with "Far Cry From Love" peaking at number 53.

In December 2017, McKenna embarked on her first headlining tour to promote the release of "High Heeled Shoes", which consisted of four dates, visiting The Sugarmill, The Venue, Palace Theatre and Scala. In July 2018, she supported Michael Bublé at the British Summer Time show at Hyde Park. On 26 July 2018, McKenna released her debut autobiographical book, Mouthy, published by John Blake. The book topped the Sunday Times bestseller list. In August 2018, she released her debut clothing range, Studio Mouthy. This accompanied her makeup range, Mouthy Cosmetics. Later that month, McKenna took part in the first series of Celebs on the Farm. She was eliminated second, finishing in seventh place. McKenna released her debut album Story of Me on 7 December 2018. The album peaked at number four on the UK Country Chart. From May 2019 to September 2019, McKenna embarked on the Story of Me Tour across the United Kingdom. In February 2019, she participated in the sixth series of the E4 reality series Celebs Go Dating.

=== 2019–present: The X Factor: Celebrity and other projects ===
From October to November 2019, McKenna competed in the ITV series The X Factor: Celebrity and was mentored by Louis Walsh. For her audition, she performed "Everything but You", a song from Story of Me. On 30 November, she was crowned the winner of the competition with 46.3% of the final vote, which not only gave Walsh his third overall victory of the show but also won her a record deal with Syco.

The X Factor: Celebrity performances and results
Show	Song choice	Result
Auditions	"Everything but You" – Original song	Through to live shows
Live show 1	"This" – Original song	Safe (1st)
Live Show 2	"Stronger" – Original song	Safe (1st)
Live Show 3	"Half of My Heart" – Original song	Safe (1st)
Live Show 4	"When I'm Crying" – Original song	Safe (1st)
Semi-final	"It Must Have Been Love" – Roxette	Safe (1st)
Final	"One More Sleep" – Leona Lewis	Safe (1st)
Final	"This" – Original song	Winner
Final	"It Must Have Been Love (Christmas for the Broken Hearted)"	Winner

In February 2020, McKenna began recording her second studio album, and later that month, it was announced that she is set to support Lionel Richie on the British leg of his 2021 tour. In August 2020, McKenna released a clothing range with online retailer in the Style. On 5 February 2021, McKenna announced that "This" would be released as a single on 19 February 2021. In April 2021, she was announced as a contestant on the BBC competition series Celebrity MasterChef. She reached the final. On 28 May 2021, McKenna the song "Ruin Your Night", which was followed by "Won't Go Back Again" on 24 September 2021.

In October 2021, McKenna announced the release of her second book. Titled Can You Make That Gluten Free?, the book is a gluten free recipe book inspired by her coeliac diet. On 19 November 2021, McKenna released her first original Christmas song, "Family at Christmas".

In June 2022, McKenna announced that she had left her record label. She explained that her pop music releases had been heavily influenced by them as they had preferred them to the country songs McKenna had instead wanted to release. Following the departure, she announced that she would be independently releasing a song a week, beginning with the single "Baby Talk" on 24 June 2022. Also in June 2022, she performed at Glastonbury Festival, a moment she had "dreamt of" throughout her career.

In December 2022, McKenna appeared on Celebrity Masterchef Festive Extravaganza, which she won. In March 2025, she released her third book, Love Gluten Free, another cookbook that is centred around coeliac-friendly recipes. Later that year, she co-created Naturally Genius, a range of gluten free bread, in partnership with Genius Foods.

== Filmography ==
As herself
Year	Title	Notes
2009	Britain's Got Talent	Part of music duo Harmony
2010, 2016–2017	The Only Way Is Essex	Main cast
2015–2016	Ex on the Beach	Series 3 main cast, Series 4 ex
2016	Celebrity Big Brother	Housemate; 10th place
2017	There's Something About Megan	Lead role; 3 episodes
2017, 2022	Celebability	Guest appearances
2018	Celebs on the Farm	Main cast; 6th place
2019	Celebs Go Dating	Main cast
2019	The X Factor: Celebrity	Contestant; winner
2021	Celebrity MasterChef	Contestant; finalist
2022	Celebrity MasterChef Festive Extravaganza	Contestant; winner

== Discography ==
- Story of Me (2018)

== Bibliography ==
- Mouthy (2018)
- Can You Make That Gluten Free? (2021)
- Love Gluten Free (2025)

Awards and achievements
Preceded by Dalton Harris	Winner of The X Factor; 2019	Succeeded by Real Like You
Preceded by The Power of Love	Winner's singles of The X Factor; It Must Have Been Love (Christmas for the Broken Hearted)	Succeeded by Incumbent
