= List of Command & Conquer media =

This is a list of all released Command & Conquer media with release dates.

Unless otherwise noted, information is referenced to related Wikipedia articles and MobyGames. Information about the soundtracks was received from iTunes Store.

== Games ==
=== Video games ===
Game	Details
Command & Conquer Original release date(s): MS-DOS: NA: September 26, 1995; Macintosh: NA: 1996; Sega Saturn: NA: December 18, 1996; PlayStation: NA: January 15, 1997; Windows 95: NA: March 10, 1997; Nintendo 64: NA: June 29, 1999	Release years by system: 1995-MS-DOS; 1996-Macintosh, Saturn; 1997-PlayStation, Windows 95; 1999-Nintendo 64
Command & Conquer: The Covert Operations Original release date(s): NA: 1996	Release years by system: 1996-MS-DOS
Command & Conquer: Red Alert Original release date(s): MS-DOS, Windows: NA: November 22, 1996; EU: November 22, 1996; PlayStation: NA: October 25, 1997	Release years by system: 1996-MS-DOS, Microsoft Windows; 1997- PlayStation
Command & Conquer: Red Alert: Counterstrike Original release date(s): NA: April 3, 1997	Release years by system: 1997-Microsoft Windows, DOS
Command & Conquer: Red Alert: The Aftermath Original release date(s): NA: 1997	Release years by system: 1997-Microsoft Windows, DOS
Command & Conquer: Sole Survivor Original release date(s): NA: November 18, 1997	Release years by system: 1997-Microsoft Windows
Command & Conquer: Red Alert: Retaliation Original release date(s): NA: August 28, 1998	Release years by system: 1998-PlayStation
Command & Conquer: Tiberian Sun Original release date(s): NA: August 27, 1999	Release years by system: 1999-Microsoft Windows
Command & Conquer: Tiberian Sun – Firestorm Original release date(s): NA: March 7, 2000	Release years by system: 2000-Microsoft Windows
Command & Conquer: Red Alert 2 Original release date(s): NA: October 25, 2000; EU: October 27, 2000	Release years by system: 2000-Microsoft Windows
Command & Conquer: Yuri's Revenge Original release date(s): NA: October 10, 2001; EU: October 19, 2001	Release years by system: 2001-Microsoft Windows
Command & Conquer: Renegade Original release date(s): NA: February 26, 2002; EU: March 1, 2002	Release years by system: 2002-Microsoft Windows
Command & Conquer: Generals Original release date(s): Windows: NA: February 10, 2003; EU: February 14, 2003; Macintosh: NA: April, 2004	Release years by system: 2003-Microsoft Windows; 2004-Macintosh
Command & Conquer: Generals: Zero Hour Original release date(s): Windows: NA: September 22, 2003; Macintosh: NA: February, 2005	Release years by system: 2003-Microsoft Windows; 2005-Macintosh
Command & Conquer 3: Tiberium Wars Original release date(s): Windows: NA: March 28, 2007; EU: March 29, 2007; Xbox 360: NA: May 10, 2007; EU: May 11, 2007; Mac OS X: NA: August 28, 2007	Release years by system: 2008-Microsoft Windows, Xbox 360, Mac OS X
Command & Conquer 3: Kane's Wrath Original release date(s): Windows: NA: March 24, 2008; EU: March 28, 2008; Xbox 360: NA: June 24, 2008	Release years by system: 2008-Microsoft Windows, Xbox 360
Command & Conquer: Red Alert 3 Original release date(s): Windows: NA: October 28, 2008; EU: October 31, 2008; Xbox 360: NA: November 11, 2008; EU: November 14, 2008; PlayStation 3: EU: March 27, 2009; NA: March 23, 2009	Release years by system: 2008-Microsoft Windows, Xbox 360; 2009-PlayStation 3
Command & Conquer: Red Alert 3 – Uprising Original release date(s): Windows: WW: March 12, 2009	Release years by system: 2009-Microsoft Windows
Command & Conquer 4: Tiberian Twilight Original release date(s): Windows: NA: March 16, 2010; EU: March 19, 2010	Release years by system: 2010-Microsoft Windows

== Other media ==
=== Collector's Editions ===
Game	Details
Command & Conquer: Red Alert: The Collector's Pack Original release date(s): EU: 1997; AU: 1997	Release years by system: 1997-Microsoft Windows
Command & Conquer: Tiberian Sun: Platinum Edition Original release date(s): NA: 1999	Release years by system: 1999-Microsoft Windows
Command & Conquer: Red Alert 2: Collector's Edition Original release date(s): NA: October, 2000	Release years by system: 2000-Microsoft Windows
Command & Conquer 3: Tiberium Wars: Kane Edition Original release date(s): NA: March 24, 2007	Release years by system: 2007-Microsoft Windows
Command & Conquer: Red Alert 3: Premier Edition Original release date(s): NA: October 28, 2008	Release years by system: 2008-Microsoft Windows

=== Smaller compilations ===
Game	Details
Command & Conquer + The Covert Operations Original release date(s): NA: 1996	Release years by system: 1996-MS-DOS, Microsoft Windows
Command & Conquer: Red Alert – The Domination Pack Original release date(s): NA: October 28, 1997	Release years by system: 1997-MS-DOS, Microsoft Windows
Command & Conquer: Gold Original release date(s): NA: 1998	Release years by system: 1998-Microsoft Windows
Command & Conquer: Red Alert – The Arsenal Original release date(s): NA: 1998	Release years by system: 1998-MS-DOS, Microsoft Windows
Command & Conquer: Tiberian Sun – Firepower Original release date(s): NA: 2000	Release years by system: 2000-Microsoft Windows
Command & Conquer: Red Strike Original release date(s): NA: March 19, 2002	Release years by system: 2002-Microsoft Windows
Command & Conquer: Generals - Deluxe Edition Original release date(s): Microsoft Windows: NA: October 21, 2003; Macintosh: NA: March, 2006	Release years by system: 2003-Microsoft Windows; 2006-Macintosh
Command & Conquer 3: Limited Collection Original release date(s): NA: March 24, 2008	Release years by system: 2008-Microsoft Windows
Command & Conquer 3: Deluxe Edition Original release date(s): NA: September 26, 2008	Release years by system: 2008-Microsoft Windows

=== Larger compilations ===
Game	Details
Command & Conquer: Worldwide Warfare Original release date(s): NA: 1998	Release years by system: 1998-MS-DOS, Microsoft Windows
Command & Conquer: Theater Of War Original release date(s): NA: October 5, 2001	Release years by system: 2001-MS-DOS, Microsoft Windows
Command & Conquer: Collection Original release date(s): NA: October 14, 2003	Release years by system: 2003-Microsoft Windows
Command & Conquer: The First Decade Original release date(s): NA: February 7, 2006	Release years by system: 2006-Microsoft Windows
Command & Conquer: Saga Original release date(s): NA: October 30, 2007	Release years by system: 2007-Microsoft Windows

== Online games ==
Pogo.com released two Command & Conquer online games, Command & Conquer: Attack Copter and Command & Conquer: Armored Attack, which are adventure games where you control a helicopter and tank respectively. You have different objectives in the missions, such as destroying buildings. It is based on Command & Conquer: Generals. Electronic Arts released MMO game Command and Conquer: Tiberium Alliances.

== Soundtrack ==
Title	Release date	Length	Label
The Music of Command & Conquer	1995	72:51	Westwood Studios
Notes: Composed by Frank Klepacki
The Music of Command & Conquer: Red Alert	1996	67:44	Westwood Studios
Notes: Composed by Frank Klepacki
Command & Conquer: Sole Survivor Online			
Notes:
Command & Conquer: Tiberian Sun	January 1, 1999	65:58	Westwood Studios
Notes:
Command & Conquer: Tiberian Sun Firestorm			
Notes:
Command & Conquer: Red Alert 2			
Notes:
Command & Conquer: Yuri's Revenge			
Notes:
Command & Conquer: Renegade			
Notes:
Command & Conquer: Generals			
Notes:
Command & Conquer: Generals Zero Hour			
Notes:
Command & Conquer 3: Tiberium Wars			
Notes:
Command & Conquer 3: Kane's Wrath			
Notes:
Command & Conquer: Red Alert 3			

== Printed media ==
Title	Release date	ISBN	Media type
Command & Conquer: Tiberium Wars	May 29, 2007	ISBN 978-0-345-49814-4	Novelization
Notes: Written by Keith R. A. DeCandido
