= The First Decade =

The First Decade may refer to:

- The First Decade (album), an album by April Wine
- The First Decade (poem), a poem by Niccolò Machiavelli
- Command & Conquer: The First Decade, a Command & Conquer compilation
- The First Decade (1983–1993), an album by Michael W. Smith
