= Aesthetics (disambiguation) =

Aesthetics is the branch of philosophy concerned with the nature of beauty and the nature of taste.

Aesthetics or Aesthetic may also refer to:

- Aesthetics (textile), one of the basic concepts of serviceability of textiles
- Aestheticians, cosmetologists who specialize in skin care

== Albums ==
- Aesthetic (TripleS EP), the first extended play by +(KR)ystal Eyes
- Aesthetic (From First to Last EP), the debut EP by From First to Last
