= From First to Last discography =

- Studio albums: 5
- Extended plays: 2
- Soundtrack albums: 6
- Singles: 17
- Music videos: 5

The following is a comprehensive discography of From First to Last, an American post-hardcore band formed in 1999.

== Studio albums ==
| Year | Album details | Peak chart positions | | | | | |
| Year | Album details | US | US Heat. | US Ind. | AUS | CAN | UK |
|---|---|---|---|---|---|---|---|
| 2004 | Dear Diary, My Teen Angst Has a Bodycount: Released: June 28, 2004; Label: Epitaph; Format: CD | — | 12 | 21 | — | — | — |
| 2006 | Heroine: Released: March 21, 2006; Label: Epitaph; Format: CD | 25 | — | 2 | 71 | 38 | 192 |
| 2008 | From First to Last: Released: May 6, 2008; Label: Suretone/Interscope; Format: CD | 81 | — | — | — | — | — |
| 2010 | Throne to the Wolves: Released: March 16, 2010; Label: Rise; Format: CD | — | — | 45 | — | — | — |
| 2015 | Dead Trees: Released: April 23, 2015; Label: Sumerian; Format: CD, vinyl, digital download | — | — | 12 | — | — | — |
"—" denotes a release that did not chart.

== Extended plays ==
| Year | Album details |
|---|---|
| 2003 | Aesthetic: Released: June 24, 2003; Label: Four Leaf; Format: CD |
| 2026 | We Were Bleeding Anyway: Released: October 2, 2026; Label: Fearless; Format: CD, vinyl, digital download |

== Singles ==
| Year | Title | Album |
|---|---|---|
| 2003 | "Such a Tragedy" | Aesthetic EP |
| 2003 | "Regrets and Romance" | Aesthetic EP |
| 2003 | "My Heart, Your Hands" | Aesthetic EP |
| 2004 | "Ride the Wings of Pestilence" | Dear Diary, My Teen Angst Has a Body Count |
| 2005 | "Note to Self" | Dear Diary, My Teen Angst Has a Body Count |
| 2006 | "The Latest Plague" | Heroine |
| 2006 | "Shame Shame" | Heroine |
| 2007 | "Two as One" | From First to Last |
| 2008 | "Worlds Away" | From First to Last |
| 2009 | "Going Lohan" | Throne to the Wolves |
| 2009 | "Cashing Out" | Throne to the Wolves |
| 2009 | "I'll Inoculate the World with the Virus of My Disillusionment" | Throne to the Wolves |
| 2014 | "Dead Trees" | Dead Trees |
| 2015 | "Black and White" | Dead Trees |
| 2015 | "I Solemnly Swear That I Am Up to No Good" | Dead Trees |
| 2017 | "Make War" | Non-album singles |
| 2018 | "Surrender" | Non-album singles |
| 2024 | "Genesis" | Non-album singles |
| 2024 | "REV" | Non-album singles |
| 2025 | "Mirror Soul" | Non-album singles |
| 2026 | "Your Name In Red Ink" | We Were Bleeding Anyway |

== Music videos ==
| Year | Title | Director | Album |
|---|---|---|---|
| 2003 | "Such a Tragedy" | n/a | Aesthetic EP |
| 2004 | "Ride the Wings of Pestilence" | Pax Franchot | Dear Diary, My Teen Angst Has a Body Count |
| 2005 | "Note to Self" | Pax Franchot | Dear Diary, My Teen Angst Has a Body Count |
| 2006 | "The Latest Plague" | Popcore Film | Heroine |
| 2006 | "Shame Shame" | | Heroine |
| 2008 | "Worlds Away" | Christopher Sims | From First to Last |
| 2026 | "Your Name In Red Ink" | Travis Richter | We Were Bleeding Anyway |
| 2026 | "They Said Your Ghost Was A Promise" | CC Bryant | We Were Bleeding Anyway |
| 2026 | "Picking Clothes To Die In" | | We Were Bleeding Anyway |

== Compilation appearances ==
| Year | Title | Album |
|---|---|---|
| 2003 | "X12 Days of XXXMASX" | A Santa Cause: It's a Punk Rock Christmas |
| 2005 | "Failure by Designer Jeans" | Punk-O-Rama 10 |
| 2005 | "Christmassacre" | Taste of Christmas |
| 2006 | "The Latest Plague" (Atticus remix) | Unsound |
| 2009 | "Tick Tock Tomorrow" (Wes Borland/Renholdër remix) | Underworld: Rise of the Lycans – Original Motion Picture Soundtrack |
| 2009 | "Hell March 1" (remix) | The Music of Command & Conquer: Red Alert 3 |
