= Essential Media =

Essential Media may refer to:

- EQ Media Group, formerly Essential Media Group, a global television production company
- Essential Media Communications, an Australian public relations and market research company known for its opinion polls
