= Ra1 =

Ra1 may refer to:-

- Ra.One, a 2011 Hindi science fiction film starring Shahrukh Khan, Kareena Kapoor and Arjun Rampal.
- Command and Conquer: Red Alert, a strategy computer game developed by Westwood Studios.
