= EQ Media Group =

Australian production company

Perpetual Entertainment
- Formerly: Essential Media and Entertainment; Essential Media Group; EQ Media Group (2020–2023)
- Founded: 2005; 21 years ago
- Founders: Chris Hilton; Ian Collie; Sonja Armstrong
- Key people: Greg Queil (CEO); David Alrich (Head of Unscripted)
- Website: perpetualentertainment.com

EQ Media Group, formerly Essential Media Group (EMG), is a global television production company with production and development hubs in Los Angeles, USA; Sydney, Australia; Auckland, New Zealand; and Vancouver, Canada.

== History ==
EMG was formed in 2016 with the full merger of Quail Entertainment US, Australia’s Essential Media & Entertainment, Essential Quail Television (EQTV), and Los Angeles-based 11 Television. Toronto’s Kew Media acquired the company in July 2018, but in March 2020, the company was bought out by EMG CEO Greg Quail and North American president Jesse Fawcett, after the collapse of Kew Media.

In June 2012, Essential Media and Entertainment entered the Canadian production business by partnering with Canadian/American television production company 11 Television, the company that produces North Canadian adaptations of Essential Media and Entertainment's formats in the US and Canada, as they merged American/Canadian television production studio 11 Television into Essential Media and Entertainment as its Canadian production studio as the two companies have jointly teamed up to establish Essential Media and Entertainment's new in-house Canadian production subsidiary entitled Essential 11 Media Group to produce factual entertainment formats for Australian, Canadian, American & other international broadcasting networks, Essential Media & Entertainment's co-founder & CEO Chris Hilton have been served as president of the newly established Canadian joint-venture subsidiary Essential 11 Media Group as it assumed 11 Television's production offices based in Los Angeles & Toronto whilst 11 Television's founders & executive producers Kevin Healey and Jesse Fawcett became CCO and COO & executive producers of the newly launched Essential Media and Entertainment's unit Essential 11 Media Group.

In May 2013 when Esssential Media and Entertainment's successful drama series Rake have been picked up by American network Fox to produce an American adaptation, Essential Media and Entertainment increased its American production operations with the establishment of its new in-house Los Angeles production office, Essential Media and Entertainment had already have a Los Angeles production office via its subsidiary Essential 11 Media Group to produce & adapt factual entertainment & programming formats in North America, however with the founding of Essential Media and Entertainment's new own standalone in-house Los Angeles unit (appointing a VP of Drama Development) the new separate, direct in-house branch allowed Essential to independently pitch, develop, and market its premium scripted dramas, feature films, children's content and documentaries directly to US broadcasters in the American market, Essential Media and Entertainment had appointed Simonne Overend to become the new in-house Los Angeles production office as its VP of Drama Development.

In February 2015, Essential Media and Entertainment had expanded its production capacities into Queensland by establishing its new Queenland production division to develop and produce Queensland-originated stories and storytellers, foster existing relationships with Queensland practitioners and provide a conduit to emerging talent within the Queensland production sector entitled Essential Media Queenlands as it opened up its new Queensland production office based at QUT, Kelvin Grove in Brisbane as Essential Media and Entertainment had appointed Roger Monk to the company's new Queensland based scripted Development Producer of its new unit Essential Media Queenland with former See-Saw Films staff member Emily Avila became Development Assistant of Essential's new unit Essential Media Queensland.

In September 2015, Essential Media and Entertainment's Canadian production subsidiary Essential 11 Television had been retoooled into Essential Media and Entertainment's in-house Canadian production division & was renamed into Essential Media Canada and executive producer Jonathan Dueck had assumed the role of CEO of the rebranded Canadian division Essential Media Canada and Joey Case have taken the role of creative producer & executive producer of the rebranded Canadian production division, while Essential Media and Entertainment's co-founder Chris Hilton and Jesse Fawcett continue to serve as executive producers of the rebranded Canadian production division Essential Media Canada while the rebranded Canadian arm Essential Media Canada announcing that Paul Taylor had returned to the company as head of development.

In October 2016, Essential Media and Entertainment under its American production arm Essential Media US had colloborated with leading Australian factual entertainment production unit Quail Television to jointly establish their new joint-venture American entertainment production company based in Los Angeles entitled Essential Quail Media, the new joint-venture production company would develop & produce all scritped & unscripted programming state and become a powerhouse in producing new lifestyle American factual productions as co-founder of Essential Quail Media's parent Essential Media and Entertainment, Chris Hitlon, co-founder of Australian factual production outfit Quail Television, Greg Quail, and development producer of Essential Media and Entertainment's American & Canadian arms Essential Media US & Essential Media Canada and Canadian production studio RTR Media, Paul Taylor, has joined EQTV as head of development.

In September 2017, Essential Media and Entertainment had announced its temporary exit from the scripted productions business as they had sold its high-end scripted drama production division alongside its entire drama and scripted television programming catalogue—which included internationally acclaimed hits like Rake, Doctor Doctor, and Jack Irish to British entertainment production/distribution company FremantleMedia as the latter brought a majority stake, that same time Essential Media and Entertainment's co-founder & head of scripted, Ian Collie, had left the company as he formed a new scripted production company backed by FremantleMedia, known as Easy Tiger Prouctions, as the new company taking over Essential's drama development state with former head of scripted at Essential Media & Entertainment, Ian Collie, leading the new company. Also in that same month Essential Media and Entertainment had also exited the children's production genre with head of children's entertainment Carmel Travers depaturing the company while she had taken Essential Media and Entertainment's entire kids & family programming catalouge alongside its development state and had established a new Australian independent kids & family entertainment production company called Pop Family Entertainment.

In July 2018 ten months after Essential Media Group had splitten its drama production development division as an independent company called Easy Tiger within British entertainment company FremantleMedia back in September 2017, Essential Media Group announced their return to the scripted production operations with the creation of its new in-house international drama production division entitled Essential Scripted, that can produce & develop new premium scripted programming for broadcasters & cinemas worldwide with co-founder and CEO of Essential Media Group, Chris Hilton, and CCO Greg Quail leading Essential Media Group's newly formed scripted division Essential Scripted.

In November 2018, Essential Media Group had appointed former Seven Network executive and former Endemol Shine Australia head of commercial partnerships manager of production, Lauren Peacock, to become their newly created jead of commercial partnerships.

In April 2019, Essential Media Group strenghted its production dveelopment operations to New Zealand as they had colloarborated with New Zealand film & television entertainment company based in Wellington, Libertine Pictures, to create Essential Media Group's in-house New Zealand production division called Essential Media Group NZ to develop & produce scripted & non-scripted programming starting with its first production entitled Griff’s Kiwi Adventures, also known as Griff's Great Kiwi Road Trip outside New Zealand for New Zealand broadcasting channel Prime & British TV network Channel 4 who starring Welsh actor, comedian & former founder of Talkback, Griff Rhys Jones.

It was rebranded to EQ Media Group in August 2020.

== Description ==
EQ Media Group is a global television production company with production and development hubs in Los Angeles, Sydney, Auckland, and Vancouver.

== Selected awards and nominations ==
- Golden Gate Award - San Francisco International Film Festival
- Silver Plaques - Chicago International Film Festival
- Cine Golden Eagle Award
- UN Media Peace Prizes
- Selected for Joris Ivens Award Competition at IDFA
- Human Rights Awards
- Banff Rocky Award Nominations (
- ATOM Awards
- Best Documentary, Film Critics Circle
- AFI Best Documentary Award
- AFI Best Documentary Nominations and numerous craft awards
- Logie Award for Most Outstanding Doc Series (and other nominations)
- Dendy Best Documentary Award and Nominations, Sydney Film Festival
- Walkley Award for Excellence in Journalism

== Programming ==
Title	Years	Network	Notes
Rake US	2014	Fox	co-production with Sony Pictures Television, Blow by Blow Entertainment and Fedora Entertainment
Fool's Gold	2014–2015	Discovery Channel Canada	Known as Essential 11 Television for season 1 and Essential Media Canada for season 2
Sydney Sailboat	2015	ABC Kids	Also known as Bubble Bath Bay; co-production with Ideete Media, Telegael, Lemon Sky Studios, Bejuba! Entertainment and Shambles Communications; Owned by Pop Family Entertainment
Under the Vines	2021–present	TVNZ 1; Acorn TV	Known as EQ Media Group until season 3; co-production with Libertine Pictures and Hardy White Pictures

=== Non-scripted ===
- No Demo Reno (2021)
- Selling the Big Easy (2021)
- Texas FlipnMove (2013-2019)
- Restored (2013-2021)
- Mom and Me (2018)
- Ghost Loop (2017)
- Ivan Milat: Buried Secrets (2021)
- After the Night (2021)
- This Could Go Anywhere (2020)
- Outback Lockdown (2020)
- Rhys Darby: Big in Japan (2020)
- Koala Rescue (2020)
- Cook Like An Italian (2020)
- Griff's Great Kiwi Road Trip (2019)
- The Pacific: In the Wake of Captain Cook, with Sam Neill (2018)
- Body Hack (2016-2021)
- The Grammar of Happiness (2011)
- Seduction in the City (2011)
- A Traveler's Guide to the Planets (2010)
- Miracles (2010)
- The Pharaoh Who Conquered the Sea (2010)
- The Making of Modern Australia (2010)
- Gourmet Farmer (2010)
- Whatever! The Science of Teens (2009)
- Lush House (2009)
- Solo (2008)
- Connected: The Power of Six Degrees (2008)
- Rodney's Robot Revolution (2008)
- The Hobbit Enigma (2008)
- Rogue Nation (2008)
- Miracle on Everest (2008)
- Never Say Die Matildas (2008)
- Indonesia: A Reporter's Journey (2008)
- The Choir (2007)
- Songlines to the Seine (2007)
- Policing the Pacific (2007)
- The Catalpa Rescue (2007)
- Is Your House Killing You? (2007)
- Ten Pound Poms (2007)
- In the Line of Fire (2007)
- Neil Perry's High Steaks (2006)
- Johnny Warren's Football Mission (2006)
- The Floating Brothel (2006)
- Heat in the Kitchen (2005)

=== Scripted ===
- Troppo 2021 (with Beyond Productions)
- At Home With Julia (2013)
- Wednesday Night Fever (2014)
- Rake (2010)
- Jack Irish (2011)
- The Last Confession of Alexander Pearce (2008)
- Scorched (2008)

=== Feature films ===
Title	Release date	Distributor	Notes
Saving Mr. Banks	29 November 2013 (United Kingdom); 13 December 2013 (United States); 9 January 2014 (Australia)	Walt Disney Studios Motion Pictures	Now placed under Easy Tiger's catalouge; co-production with Walt Disney Pictures, Hopscotch Features and BBC Films
The Broken Shore	4 February 2014	Entertainment One	Credited on Easy Tiger Productions' catalouge; co-production with Entertainment One
