= Sydney Sailboat =

- Genre: Animated series
- Created by: Gareth Eden-Styche
- Directed by: Steve Trenbirth
- Voices of: Samson Hyland; Frederique Sims; Colin Friels; Emma Tate; Jack Simmons; Paul Tylak; Georgia Simmons; Adam Longworth; Jacinda Papadopoulos; Conor Drury; Teegan Hurley
- Opening theme: "Ahoy, Sydney Sailboat" performed by Samson Hyland and Frederique Sims
- Country of origin: Australia
- Original language: English
- No. of seasons: 2
- No. of episodes: 52

Production
- Executive producers: Carmel Travers; Chris Hilton; Paul Cummins; Zainir Aminullah; Wong Cheng Fei
- Producers: Carmel Travers; Cathy Ní Fhlaithearta; Ken Foong Ka King
- Running time: 15 minutes
- Production companies: Essential Media and Entertainment; Ideate Media; Telegael; Lemon Sky Studios; Shambles Communications

Original release
- Network: ABC Kids; Sprout
- Release: 9 March – 31 July 2015

Sydney Sailboat (originally known as Bubble Bath Bay in Australia) is an animated television series for children that follows the adventures of Sydney the Sailboat and his fleet of friends who live in Bubble Bath Bay. The 11-minute episodes premiered on ABC Kids from 9 March 2015 with a second season screening in 2016. On September 26, 2015, it also aired in the United States on Sprout.

== Characters ==
=== Main ===
- Sydney Sailboat is the protagonist of the series. He is a plucky young male sailboat who dreams of one day sailing out through The Heads to explore the mysterious Big Blue Sea beyond the harbour. Occasionally, he puts out his special coloured sail to go faster. He also has a front compartment where he keeps his set of tools which he uses in certain situations. His catchphrase is “Spinnaker, fly!” He is voiced by Samson Hyland.
- Zip is a feisty, young female trainee water taxi who is Sydney's best friend. She dreams of becoming the best water taxi in the whole harbor. Her catchphrase is “Hoop-dee-doo!” She is voiced by Frederique Sims.
- Terry is a strong male tugboat, who is the leader of the fleet, and keeps Bubble Bath Bay in order. His catchphrase is "Anchors aweigh!" Voiced by Colin Friels.

=== Supporting ===
- Bryan is a male green boat, and one of two chatterbox ferries in the harbour. Voiced by Jack Simmons.
- Toots is a female red boat, and the other chatterbox ferry in the harbour. Voiced by Georgia Simmons.
- Muddles is an uneasy male crane boat. Voiced by Paul Tylak.
- Stormy is a female red Petrel bird who oversees the activities of the boats. She also rings the bell to signal certain operations. Voiced by Emma Tate.
- Jet is a flamboyant young male speed boat. Voiced by Jack Simmons.
- Rodney is a swanky submarine who wears a monocle. Voiced by Adam Longworth.
- Cleo is a recklessly adventurous young female sailboat. Like Sydney, she is equipped with a special coloured sail to accelerate her movements. Voiced by Jacinda Papadopoulos.
- Queen Josephine is a mute giant ocean liner who passed through Bubble Bath Bay on two occasions.
- Min is a cute blue young male oar-powered boat who wears a sea monster's head on his bow. Voiced by Jack Simmons.
- Slick is a playful seal pup.

== Production ==
Development for Sydney Sailboat, aka Bubble Bath Bay was announced in September 2013, when Essential Media & Entertainment had announced a new CGI animated series commissioned by the Australian Broadcasting Corporation for its Australian TV channel ABC 4 Kids entitled Bubble Bath Bay with Essential Media & Entertainment would serve as production company for Bubble Bath Bay. A month later in October of that same year during Essential Media & Entertainment programming state at MIPCOM, the series became an Australian/Irish/Malaysian co-production when Esseential Media & Entertainment had ventured with Irish animation production outfit Telegael and Malasian studios which are Ideate Media and animation production company & video game developing studio Lemon Sky Studios to develop and co-produce the series while Lemon Sky Studios would handle animation services for the series, meamwhile former Walt Disney Animation Australia producer & director Steve Trenbirth have been named as series producer and actor Colin Friels have been revealed to be the voice of harbourmaster Terry the Tug, Canadian distribution cimpany Bejuba! Entertainment have been named as international distributor of the series outside Australia.

== Episodes ==
Series	Episodes	Originally aired	
Series	Episodes	First aired	Last aired
1	52	9 March 2015	3 April 2015
2	52	27 April 2015	31 July 2016

=== Series 1 (2015) ===
No.	Title	Air Date
1	"Running on Empty"	March 9, 2015
When Sydney dares Zip to a race, Zip is in such a hurry to prove motors are faster than sails that she forgets to refuel - leaving her stranded in the harbour. Sydney's sails must save her.
2	"Royal Visit"	March 10, 2015
Queen Josephine, the biggest ocean liner in the world, is visiting the harbour. Terry has a big job to do and everything must run smoothly. But Zip and Sydney struggle to control the Canoes.
3	"Cleo at the Cove"	March 11, 2015
Cleo is having her first spinnaker fitted. Spinnakers can be tricky, so Sydney and Zip will have to keep a close eye on Cleo as she learns the ropes. But Cleo is too excited to listen.
4	"Muddled Friends"	March 12, 2015
What's bumping the boats beneath the waves? It's Humpy the baby whale. When Humpy refuses to leave, can Muddles find the courage to guide Humpy out of the harbour and reunite him with his mother?
5	"Zip in a Spin"	March 13, 2015
Sydney and Zip are going to Dry Dock for their first check- up. But when Zip is too scared to go, her wobbly propeller sends her spinning out of control. Sydney will need to find where she's spun off.
6	"Ferry Bad Luck"	March 14, 2015
Bryan crashes into the jetty and gets stuck. Everyone has a job to do to help except Sydney, who is too small. But when Bryan springs a leak, only Sydney, due to his size, can save the day.
7	"Dragon Parade"	March 15, 2015
The Bay hosts a Lantern Festival featuring a Dragon Boat race! Terry is keen to show the Bay at its best, but things unravel when Sydney, Zip and the Canoes decide to join in the race too!
8	"Muddles in the Mist"	March 16, 2015
It's a very foggy and everyone's been told to stay moored. But Zip and Sydney sneak out and mistake Muddles for the fearsome Bubble Bath Bay Monster! Zip will need to overcome fear to save her friend.
9	"Around the World in a Day"	March 17, 2015
The Bay is throwing Rodney the sub a Welcome Home Party. But instead of decorating, Sydney dreams of traveling the Big Blue Sea. Zip and Stormy show him there's lots to explore right here at home.
10	"Stormy Weather"	March 18, 2015
When Stormy warns that there's a storm coming, Sydney and Zip laugh. But then a big storm hits, and Stormy is nowhere to be found the next morning. The hunt is on as Sydney and Zip fear the worst.
11	"Bonita's Party"	March 19, 2015
When Bonita's too impatient to fix her broken outrigger, Sydney helps with a temporary fix. But when her patched-up outrigger fails, Sydney and Zip must get her back on course before disaster strikes.
12	"Gone With the Wind"	March 19, 2015
After losing a race to Jet, Sydney thinks his sails are holding him back. But when the boats are caught in a storm, Jet and Zip lose engine power. Sydney must use his sails to get them home!
13	"Cheeky Canoes"	March 20, 2015
When Zip takes her Harbour Navigation Test, Sydney gets in the way as he tries to support his friend. With the cheeky Canoes to look after too, Zip must keep it together to pass her test.
14	"Crash Landing"	March 21, 2015
Lulu narrowly avoids an accident when Slick kicks a football into her path as she lands. Sydney will have to mark out a new landing strip for her, before Slick's playfulness lead to more problems.
15	"Buoy oh Buoy"	March 22, 2015
A missing shipping container is found in the harbour so Muddles is sent to salvage it. But after Sydney hurts Zip's feelings, they'll need to make up in time before Muddles barges through.
16	"Seal of Approval"	March 23, 2015
Slick is getting in the way of a garbage clean up. Sydney can keep Slick occupied - he's going to teach him tricks. But can Slick do one particular trick to save the Bay from being polluted?
17	"Sleepy Sydney"	March 24, 2015
Sydney is so busy practising for the Time Trials that he doesn't get enough sleep. The next day he can't help but drift off to sleep, and into danger! But Zip won't let him miss the Time Trials!
18	"Sydney's Royal Parade"	March 25, 2015
There's a Grand Parade planned for Queen Josephine's return visit. Sydney is determined to work the hardest and look his best to earn the honour of being flag bearer and leading the parade.
19	"Tall Stories"	March 26, 2015
When Rodney's nephew Hilton visits, Sydney is dazzled by tales of submarine school. But a dare gets Sydney stranded outside The Heads. Hilton will need to put his boasts into action to save Sydney.
20	"A Very Ducky Day"	March 27, 2015
When a lost duckling turns up in the Bay, Stormy volunteers to care for him. But when Muddles drops a crate of rubber ducks, the duckling gets lost! Can the fleet find the real duckling in the crowd?
21	"Trash and Treasure"	March 28, 2015
When Sydney's toolbox gets too full, Terry makes him clean it out. But getting rid of his favourite things isn't easy. Especially when you accidentally give away Aurora's spare light bulb.
22	"Making Muddles Merry"	March 29, 2015
Muddles is grumpy so Sydney and Zip try to cheer him up. No matter what they try, nothing lifts his spirits. But when they discover what's really making Muddles grumpy, it's an easy fix.
23	"I Forget"	March 30, 2015
The fleet don't know that Terry has lost his memory after a bump on the funnel so cheeky Jet convinces Terry they're best friends. Sydney and Zip are left to run the Harbour - where has Terry got to?
24	"Team Spirit"	April 1, 2015
It's carnival day and everyone is enjoying the games - except for Jet who wants to win everything. When Jet is teamed with Cleo for the scavenger hunt, he must decide between winning or helping.
25	"Under the Weather"	April 2, 2015
Stormy is hurt while preparing for the Regatta, and takes advantage of Sydney's kindness. Muddles soon does the same, leaving Zip run off her rudder. But pretending to be sick isn't a smart idea.
26	"Major Hiccup"	April 3, 2015
Rodney has a serious case of the hiccups and it's driving the whole bay crazy. Armed with everybody's peculiar remedies, Sydney and Zip set out to cure their old friend.

=== Series 2 (2015) ===
No.	Title	Air Date
1	"Hot Hot Hot"	April 27, 2015
During a heatwave, Sydney and Zip try and cool down the oysters who are over-heating. It isn't until Jet sprays them with water that Sydney realises that the annoyance may actually be the solution.
2	"Hear Hear"	July 7, 2015
When Sydney and Zip mishear a message from Terry, they accidentally set off a chain of events that throw Bubble Bath Bay into chaos. They need to learn to listen to save the day.
3	"Lost and Found"	July 8, 2015
Zip and Sydney find a lost Jack-in-the-Box and realise it's perfect for playing pranks! Terry wants it put in Lost and Found, but Zip can't say goodbye. She'll find a new home for Jack instead.
4	"New Tricks"	July 9, 2015
Zip loves her new navigation device so much, she doesn't listen to Terry's lesson on navigating with the stars. When Sydney and Zip sneak out and get lost, Zip realises the value of lessons.
5	"How Terry Got His Groove Back"	July 10, 2015
When the fleet put on a concert, Terry gets to play the big bass note. But at rehearsal, all he does is parp! Terry is disheartened, what's blocking his funnel? A croaky little visitor, that's what!
6	"Worry Muddles"	July 11, 2015
When Muddles panics about the storm, he leads his cargo of clacking oysters straight into danger. Sydney and Zip must pull Muddles through his fear to deliver the oysters safe and sound.
7	"When Zip Became Zap"	July 12, 2015
Feeling a little unimportant, Zip gets a flashy paint job and pretends she's an impressive speedboat called 'Zap'. But when disaster strikes, she learns it's what's on the inside that counts.
8	"Popstar Samira"	July 13, 2015
Singing Sampan Samira is visiting the harbour. Our young boats want to make friends but are kept away by her Minder. They soon discover Samira is keen to make friends too. And enjoy some musical fun.
9	"Cleo's Big Find"	July 14, 2015
A huge balloon, the mascot for the Big Town Fun Festival, has gone missing! Little Cleo finds it, but keeps it for herself. Sydney and Zip help her realise the balloon is for everyone's enjoyment.
10	"Regatta at the Bay"	July 15, 2015
Sydney is performing at the Regatta, but he can't get the finale right. He loses his nerve leaving Zip without a sailing partner. Terry helps Sydney realise you just have to try.
11	"Sailing School Rules"	July 16, 2015
Cleo attends her first day of Sailing School, and comes home thinking she knows it all. The very next day, she goes missing. Cleo is playing Sailing School with Slick - a disaster waiting to happen.
12	"Ruffled Feathers"	July 17, 2015
Bonita gifts the Bay with a beautiful parrot. Everyone is charmed by its mimicry except for Stormy, who can't understand the fuss about a talking bird. The fleet soon learn Stormy was right.
13	"Treasure Chest"	July 18, 2015
During a big clean up of the harbour, Sydney and Zip drag up a 'treasure' chest from the harbour floor, only to discover its contents is not quite the treasure they expected.
14	"Oh, Barnacles!"	July 19, 2015
The boats of the Bay will be guests when Rodney is presented with submarine exploration award. Rodney wants everyone looking their best. But there's a problem: Rodney has a barnacle!
15	"Perfect Stormy"	July 20, 2015
Sydney and Zip find an abandoned egg and, after failing to locate its mother, enlist Stormy's help to sit on it until it hatches. When hatch-day comes, they're in for a big surprise!
16	"Scaredy Boats"	July 21, 2015
When the boats go camping at Hidden Cove, Stormy sees a strange creature in the dark. With Terry asleep, the gang investigates. Is it a fish monster? A mermaid? Aliens? No, just new friends!
17	"Coral Caves Camp Out"	July 22, 2015
Zip and Sydney get permission from Terry to camp at Hidden Cove alone. As it gets dark, both are scared, and when an equally anxious Terry comes to check on them, they mistake him for a ghost!
18	"Sydney's Boat-day"	July 23, 2015
It is Sydney's boat-day and Zip wants to get him the best gift ever. But after spending the whole day planning his surprise pirate party, Zip may have left it too late to find the perfect present.
19	"Iceberg Escape"	July 24, 2015
There's an iceberg in the Bay. And it's brought along a passenger - a penguin. Sydney and Zip have to find a way to get the little guy home. But they'd better be quick, - the iceberg is melting.
20	"Jet Ski Jumble"	July 25, 2015
With Terry away, Rodney takes charge of the Bay. Sydney and Zip are replaced by super-fast jet-skis. But, speed isn't everything. Chaos soon reigns, and Sydney and Zip must sort things out.
21	"Spring Fever"	July 26, 2015
When spring fever hits, Stormy leaves the Bay to find a new home. She soon discovers the great outdoors isn't all it's cracked up to be, while everyone in the Bay realises how much they miss her.
22	"Sub vs. Seaplane"	July 27, 2015
Rodney and Lulu don't see eye-to-eye after they almost collide in an emergency drill. Both feel the other doesn't respect their skills. Sydney and Zip try to repair the rift, but end up in trouble.
23	"Treasure Hunt"	July 28, 2015
Sydney and Zip find what they think is a treasure map. The hunt to find their fortune begins, and all their friends are keen to help. But the treasure they do find isn't quite what they expected.
24	"Stormy at Sea"	July 29, 2015
Sydney is helping Zip study for her Harbour Rescue Test. But when Stormy takes it upon herself to help too, Zip suddenly finds she has a real Harbour rescue on her hull to deal with.
25	"Shape Up"	July 30, 2015
A misunderstanding causes Terry to doubt he's the right boat to lead the fleet. An officious new tug, Doug, is his replacement. Sydney has to find a way to help Terry believe in himself again.
26	"Sydney's Slip-Up"	July 31, 2015
If the Ferries fail their License test, they'll be sent back to Ferry School. As Sydney sets up their test course, he makes a mistake. Instead of asking for help, he tries to fix it himself.
