= Music of the Command & Conquer series =

The cover of The Music of Command & Conquer

The music of the Command & Conquer series consists of the soundtracks of the Command & Conquer (C&C or CNC) video games, published in various soundtrack and compilation albums. C&C is a video game franchise, mostly of the real-time strategy style, developed primarily by Westwood Studios and Electronic Arts. Much of the music for the series was composed and produced by Westwood Studios' former sound director and video game music composer Frank Klepacki for the early games, with composition duties being taken on by several others following the liquidation of Westwood Studios in 2003. Klepacki returned to the series in 2008 to assist with the soundtrack for Red Alert 3.

== Albums ==
=== Command & Conquer ===
The Music of Command & Conquer

Studio album by Frank Klepacki
- Released: 1995
- Genres: Video game soundtrack, industrial, industrial metal
- Length: 72:51
- Label: Westwood Studios
- Producer: Frank Klepacki

Act on Instinct
Short clip of Act on Instinct — 173 KB

The Music of Command & Conquer is a soundtrack album containing musical tracks from the video game Command & Conquer, composed by Frank Klepacki and produced by Westwood. It was originally released in 1995. The soundtrack spans two discs and 22 tracks with combined duration of approximately 72 minutes. The soundtrack was bundled with some of the game's collector's editions, which feature tracks from both the original Command & Conquer and the expansion. Though it was never released through retail, Westwood Studios sold this official soundtrack by special order through its website and in game catalogues. The album was packaged with a brushed aluminium design and featuring the official Command & Conquer logo. Many songs included in the release of the album include vocals which could previously only be heard on the PlayStation or Sega Saturn versions of the game; these were actually the original versions of the songs. The voice samples in the songs conflicted with the voices in the game, factoring in their removal from the in-game soundtrack.

Some song names differ from the in-game versions. In these cases, the in-game track title is mentioned behind the original title. Also, some track titles differ from the versions on Frank Klepacki's website. In these cases, the website's track titles are mentioned behind the original in-game track title. The first seven in-game tracks are only available with the Covert Operations expansion pack.

The Command & Conquer soundtrack is the first video game produced by Westwood to feature streaming music as opposed to MIDI. The 22k mono tracks were produced using an ASR-10 sampler, a Roland S760 sampler and a Roland JD-990 synth module. Klepacki has credited influences from dozens of artists including Peter Gabriel, Pink Floyd and Nine Inch Nails in the production of the soundtrack. Klepacki wrote the songs in batches, each in different musical genres. "In The Line of Fire" was written in an orchestral style while "C&C Thang" was influenced by Hip hop and metal in "Deception". Certain songs such as Hold On, in the style of Laurie Anderson, were cut from the game because they did not fit the style Klepacki was aiming for in the overall soundtrack. With the release of the Covert Operations expansion pack Klepacki composed many of the ambient songs of which he was requested by Westwood for the game.

The track "No Mercy" as well as "Deception" feature quotes of the character Chuck De Nomolos from the film Bill & Ted's Bogus Journey. "In Trouble" contains quotes of Maverick from Top Gun and the track "I Remember Now" from the Queensrÿche album Operation: Mindcrime. None of these are actual voice samples from the original sources; they were all re-recorded in their own audio studio.

All tracks are written by Frank Klepacki.

The Music of Command & Conquer
No.	Title	Length
1.	"Act on Instinct"	2:54
2.	"No Mercy"	3:21
3.	"Industrial"	2:52
4.	"Iron Fist"	3:29
5.	"We Will Stop Them (Deception)"	3:07
6.	"Radio"	2:59
7.	"On the Prowl"	2:59
8.	"Recon"	4:18
9.	"Drone"	4:31
10.	"In the Line of Fire"	2:02
11.	"Prepare for Battle"	3:27
12.	"Depth Charge"	4:12
13.	"Rain in the Night"	2:34
14.	"Creeping Upon"	3:39
15.	"Target (Mechanical Man)"	2:49
16.	"Just Do it Up (Just Do It)"	2:20
17.	"C&C Thang"	3:10
18.	"To Be Feared"	2:41
19.	"Drill"	4:28
20.	"Full Stop (Warfare)"	3:02
21.	"In Trouble"	3:37
22.	"Air Strike"	3:17

=== Command & Conquer: Red Alert ===
The Music of Command & Conquer: Red Alert

Studio album by Frank Klepacki
- Released: 1996
- Genre: Video game soundtrack
- Length: 67:44
- Label: Westwood Studios
- Producer: Frank Klepacki

Hell March
Short clip of Hell March — 571 KB

The game's original score was composed by Frank Klepacki and was voted the best video game soundtrack of 1996 by PC Gamer and Gameslice magazines. Among his most famous songs from the series is the theme of Red Alert, titled "Hell March", which accents the style of the game with adrenalized riffs of electric guitar, the sounds of marching feet, and synthesizers to a sampled drill command. Originally intended to be the theme for the Brotherhood of Nod faction in the Covert Operations expansion to the 1995 Command & Conquer, the track eventually ended up becoming a staple in the Red Alert series instead.

After C&C came out we wasted no time kicking out Covert Ops. I wrote some more ambient style themes they asked me for, and then I began tinkering with this heavy metal song that I was trying to gear towards Nod for the next big C&C game. Brett Sperry came in my office and said "You got anything I can hear for the new C&C?" I played it for him. He said "What's the name of this one?" I said "Hell March". He said "That's the signature song for our next game".

— Frank Klepacki, Senior Composer

Following the success of "Hell March", Klepacki headed the composition of its two variations, each becoming the main theme for Red Alert 2 ("Hell March 2/HM2") and Red Alert 3 ("Hell March 3"), respectively.

When playing the single-player campaign, a limited number of tracks are initially available, and more are unlocked as the player progresses through missions. When playing in a multiplayer or "skirmish" game, however, all tracks are available from the start. More tracks were included in the Red Alert expansion packs: Counterstrike, The Aftermath and Retaliation. The music tracks can be listened to on Frank Klepacki's website.

An official soundtrack was released with unique album art designed by Westwood studios and, like the previous release, featured the official Command & Conquer series logo with the Red Alert series motif below. The album contained fifteen songs from the game, plus a hidden bonus track. Half a minute after the end of track 15 plays an unnamed bonus track. Its melodramatic opening was used in the secret campaign, and the track itself is a tribute to Misirlou, using the rhythm of an earlier Command & Conquer music piece, "No Mercy". In the media player on Frank Klepacki's website, the track is titled "Surf No Mercy".

Two tracks on the disc, "Radio 2" and "Face the Enemy 2", had the numbers at the end removed from the track listing, which could potentially cause confusion, since the original "Radio" track is from the first Command & Conquer game, and "Face The Enemy 1" is a different track in Red Alert. Any tracks with different in-game track titles have the in-game version mentioned behind the original title.

All tracks are written by Frank Klepacki.

Command & Conquer: Red Alert Soundtrack
No.	Title	Length
1.	"Hell March"	6:26
2.	"Radio (Radio 2)"	4:07
3.	"Crush"	3:51
4.	"Roll Out"	3:56
5.	"Mud"	4:50
6.	"Twin Cannon (Twin)"	3:57
7.	"Face the Enemy (Face the Enemy 2)"	5:38
8.	"Run (Run for Your Life)"	5:15
9.	"Terminate"	5:22
10.	"Big Foot"	5:17
11.	"Workmen"	4:46
12.	"Militant Force (Score Theme)"	1:52
13.	"Dense"	5:00
14.	"Vector"	4:17
15.	"Smash"	4:35

=== Command & Conquer: Tiberian Sun ===
Command & Conquer: Tiberian Sun Soundtrack

Studio album by Frank Klepacki and Jarrid Mendelson
- Released: 1999
- Genre: Video game soundtrack
- Length: 65:58
- Label: Westwood Studios
- Producer: Frank Klepacki

Dusk Hour
Short clip of Dusk Hour — 195 KB

The soundtrack of Command & Conquer: Tiberian Sun was released in 1999. In addition certain editions of Tiberian Sun came with the soundtrack bundled in, such as in the Platinum Edition and Firepower bundle pack, which also contained the original Tiberian Sun and its expansion pack, Firestorm.

Reception of the soundtrack was mixed as the music departed from the industrial music style of the original Command & Conquer in favor of a slow, moody ambient music reflecting the game's apocalyptic setting in a world being ecologically ravaged by Tiberium. Klepacki had originally started writing the soundtrack in a similar style to the previous titles but, after a meeting with Westwood, it was decided that the soundtrack would be "very dark, moody and not upbeat at all". To help him achieve the desired style Klepacki enlisted the help and "electronic style" of Jarrid Mendelson for the production of songs such as Dusk hour and Flurry before the two split to write the remainder of the songs in their respective studios.

I didn't want to stray too far from the original C&C soundtrack, but it had to be more futuristic and ambient. From there I tried to capture the mood the designers wanted for each mission. I even brought in another composer for some of the in game scores, Jarrid Mendelson, who I knew would compliment my style for this genre of music. Also, you'll notice I put more development into GDI & NOD's signature themes for the movie sequences.

— Frank Klepacki, Senior Composer

When the time came to score the music for the Firestorm expansion pack, Klepacki and the producer decided that the music should be more upbeat and a return to the original style of the music of Command & Conquer.

Unlike previous album releases the cover for Tiberian Sun did not feature the classic Command & Conquer series logo but favoured a shadowed style mirroring the ambient musical tone of the album.

All tracks are written by Frank Klepacki, except where indicated.

Command & Conquer: Tiberian Sun Soundtrack
No.	Title	Writer(s)	Length
1.	"Timebomb"		2:07
2.	"Pharotek"	Jarrid Mendelson	4:41
3.	"Lone Trooper"	Mendelson	4:42
4.	"Scouting"	Mendelson	4:17
5.	"Infrared"		4:31
6.	"Flurry"	Klepacki; Mendelson	4:15
7.	"Mutants"	Klepacki; Mendelson	4:15
8.	"Gloom"	Mendelson	4:01
9.	"Heroism"	Mendelson	4:03
10.	"Approach"		4:43
11.	"Dusk Hour"	Klepacki; Mendelson	4:18
12.	"The Defense"	Mendelson	4:05
13.	"Mad Rap"		4:33
14.	"Valves"		4:22
15.	"What Lurks"		5:17
16.	"Score"		1:49

=== Command & Conquer: Red Alert 2 ===
Red Alert 2 Original Soundtrack

Studio album by Frank Klepacki
- Released: 2001
- Genre: Video game soundtrack
- Length: 63:19
- Label: Westwood Studios
- Producer: Frank Klepacki

Hell March 2
Short clip of "Hell March 2" — 173 KB

Red Alert 2 Original Soundtrack is a soundtrack album containing musical tracks from the video game Command & Conquer: Red Alert 2, composed by Frank Klepacki and produced by Westwood. It was originally released in 2001. The soundtrack spans 16 tracks and has a duration of approximately 63:00.

The title track of the album is a rewritten version of the original Hell March from Command & Conquer: Red Alert.

Klepacki defined Red Alert 2's style with heavy metal guitar and fast-paced beats. Klepacki scored the game with a Korg Tr-rack, Novation Nova Desktop, and Roland 5080.

The return to high-energy songs was owed in part to fan criticism of Tiberian Sun. Klepacki maintained the energetic style in Red Alert 2's expansion pack Yuri's Revenge.

All tracks are written by Frank Klepacki.

Red Alert 2 Original Soundtrack
No.	Title	Length
1.	"HM2 (Hell March 2)"	3:46
2.	"Industrofunk"	3:14
3.	"Ready the Army"	4:59
4.	"Grinder"	2:29
5.	"In Deep"	3:26
6.	"Motorized"	4:04
7.	"Power"	3:58
8.	"200 Meters"	4:14
9.	"Destroy"	4:40
10.	"Burn"	4:39
11.	"Probing"	4:21
12.	"Blow It Up"	3:13
13.	"Eagle Hunter"	4:18
14.	"Fortification"	4:04
15.	"Jank"	3:48
16.	"C&C In the House"	4:06

=== Command & Conquer: Red Alert 3 ===
The Music of Command & Conquer: Red Alert 3

Studio album by Frank Klepacki, James Hannigan, Timothy Michael Wynn and Mikael Sandgren
- Released: 2008
- Genre: Video game soundtrack
- Label: EA
- Producer: EA

Composer Frank Klepacki returned to write three tracks for the game. When interviewed regarding the matter, Klepacki indicated a strong desire to contribute more, but admitted that due to the fact that he was no longer being employed by Electronic Arts and currently works for Petroglyph Games, that was contractually impossible. At the RA3 Community Summit in June 2008, Klepacki showed a video to the entire C&C community in which he stated that he had been hired to work on Red Alert 3, and that he was composing Hell March 3, the most recent update of Red Alert's iconic theme.

In November 2008, Crispy Gamer reported that James Hannigan and Timothy Michael Wynn wrote the bulk of the game's remaining 114 minutes of music, with Hannigan composing the "Soviet March" menu theme along with music for the Empire of the Rising Sun Faction, and Wynn the music of the Allies and the remaining Soviet tracks. Music4Games has also covered the game's music score.

The band From First to Last composed several remix versions of Hell March and Hell March 2, also featured on the Red Alert 3 soundtrack shipped with the Premier Edition. The expansion pack, Uprising, scored mostly by James Hannigan and Timothy Michael Wynn, introduced a new track called Yuriko's Theme by Hannigan, featuring two singers: Miriam Stockley and Satomi Morimoto. This theme was later remixed by Menno de Jong into a trance version, and it was later played at many great Trance festivals.

Red Alert 3 Original Soundtrack
No.	Title	Writer(s)	Length
1.	"Soviet March (Red Alert 3)"	James Hannigan	2:47
2.	"Hell March 3"	Frank Klepacki	3:33
3.	"Grinder 2"	Klepacki	2:56
4.	"Hell March Remix"	From First To Last	3:57
5.	"Russian Celebration"	Timothy Michael Wynn	1:04
6.	"The Might of the Empire"	Hannigan	0:53
7.	"The Motherland"	Timothy Michael Wynn	2:06
8.	"The Red Scare"	Wynn	2:05
9.	"The Calm Before ..."	Wynn	1:09
10.	"The European Storm"	Wynn	2:17
11.	"For Mother Russia"	Wynn	2:03
12.	"Russian Retreat"	Wynn	1:08
13.	"Red Rock"	Wynn	1:20
14.	"The Big Apple"	Wynn	2:04
15.	"Fortifying Brighton"	Wynn	1:15
16.	"The Red Storm Draws Near"	Wynn	1:02
17.	"Shock and Awe"	Wynn	1:52
18.	"Desertion"	Wynn	1:24
19.	"How the West was Won"	Wynn	1:49
20.	"Mykonos"	Wynn	0:41
21.	"The Battle for Mykonos"	Wynn	2:05
22.	"Lying in Wait"	Wynn	1:09
23.	"Enter the Shogun Executioner"	Hannigan	1:36
24.	"East Moves West"	Hannigan	1:32
25.	"The Rising Sun Is Setting"	Hannigan	1:06
26.	"For the Emperor!"	Hannigan	1:09
27.	"For the Empire Has Risen"	Hannigan	0:35
28.	"Eastern Mysteries"	Hannigan	1:56
29.	"Sayonara"	Hannigan	2:39
30.	"In the Belly of the Dragon"	Hannigan	2:49
31.	"The Sleeping Beast"	Hannigan	1:59
32.	"The Red Menace"	Klepacki	1:06
33.	"American Cowboys"	Wynn	1:14
34.	"All Your Base Are Belong to Us"	Hannigan	1:04
35.	"The War Machine Heads West"	Wynn	2:04
36.	"Crisis in Cuba"	Wynn	2:08
37.	"The Floating Monstrosity"	Hannigan	1:59
38.	"The Chill of War"	Wynn	1:02
39.	"Soviet Winter"	Wynn	1:41
40.	"Take 'Em Out, Tanya!"	Wynn	1:07
41.	"The Download"	Wynn	1:05
42.	"Red Alert 3 Credits"	Mikael Sandgren	2:27
43.	"Soviet March (Reprise)"	Hannigan	2:44
44.	"Hell March 2 Remix"	From First to Last	1:14

=== Command & Conquer Remastered Collection Original Soundtrack ===
Command & Conquer Remastered Collection Original Soundtrack

Studio album by Frank Klepacki, Frank Klepacki & The Tiberian Sons
- Released: 2020
- Genres: Video game soundtrack, industrial, industrial metal
- Label: EA Music
- Producer: EA Music

The soundtrack of the Remastered Collection was released as physical CDs in the game's 25th Anniversary Edition physical box, as FLAC and raw WAV files on a tiberium crystal shaped USB flash drive in both the 25th Anniversary Edition and the smaller Special Edition box, and on several digital platforms. It includes all music from Command & Conquer and Red Alert, including all bonus tracks unlockable in the game, as well as a studio album of Frank Klepacki with the fan band The Tiberian Sons. The full collection spans six CDs.

Most of the tracks in C&C1 that have differing names in the original game and in the original soundtrack come pre-labelled with both names in this release. However, for Red Alert, this was only done for one track, while several have modified names.

==== Command & Conquer ====
Command & Conquer (Original Soundtrack) [Remastered]

Studio album by Frank Klepacki
- Released: 2020
- Genres: Video game soundtrack, industrial, industrial metal
- Label: EA Music
- Producer: EA Music

Labelled "DISC_1" and "DISC_2" in the physical edition, these two CDs contain the soundtrack of the original game.

The first Command & Conquer disc contains the remastered music of the base game. These versions are lacking any sound clips featured in the original game's soundtrack disc versions, appearing in the same style as they did in the original game.

All tracks are written by Frank Klepacki.

Command & Conquer (Original Soundtrack) [Remastered] Disc 1
No.	Title	Length
1.	"Tiberian Dawn Map Theme"	1:01
2.	"Act on Instinct"	2:46
3.	"Demolition"	3:02
4.	"Target / Mechanical Man"	2:52
5.	"Warfare / Full Stop"	3:01
6.	"We Will Stop Them / Deception"	3:09
7.	"Industrial"	2:53
8.	"Canyon Chase"	2:42
9.	"No Mercy"	3:27
10.	"On the Prowl"	3:02
11.	"Prepare for Battle"	3:29
12.	"Take 'Em Out"	3:02
13.	"In Trouble / Looks Like Trouble"	3:11
14.	"Radio"	3:01
15.	"Rain in the Night"	2:34
16.	"March To Doom"	2:37
17.	"In the Line of Fire"	2:04
18.	"Just Do It Up"	2:21
19.	"Fight Win Prevail"	0:53
20.	"Untamed Land"	3:05
21.	"To Be Feared"	2:45
22.	"C&C Thang"	3:12
23.	"Great Shot!"	0:40
24.	"Airstrike"	3:17

The second Command & Conquer disc is labelled specifically as "Covert Operations & Bonus Tracks" in the physical release. The mentioned bonus tracks include the original soundtrack release versions of tracks already present on the first CD.

All tracks are written by Frank Klepacki, except where indicated.

Command & Conquer (Original Soundtrack) [Remastered] Disc 2
No.	Title	Writer(s)	Length
1.	"Depth Charge"		4:15
2.	"Creeping Upon"		3:37
3.	"Drill"		4:27
4.	"Drone"		4:32
5.	"Iron Fist"		3:30
6.	"Recon"		4:22
7.	"Voice Rhythm"		5:07
8.	"Act on Instinct (OST version)"		2:52
9.	"No Mercy (OST version)"		3:21
10.	"Just Do It Up (OST version)"		2:22
11.	"In Trouble / Looks Like Trouble (OST version)"		3:32
12.	"We Will Stop Them / Deception (OST version)"		3:09
13.	"Nod Map Theme"		0:41
14.	"C&C 80s Mix"		4:03
15.	"Die"		2:41
16.	"Heartbreak"		3:22
17.	"Reaching Out"		1:59
18.	"Ride of the Valkyries"	Richard Wagner	5:01
19.	"Nod Score"		0:33
20.	"Great Shot Extended"		0:56
21.	"Tank Battle"		3:11
22.	"C&C Credits Outtakes Theme"		3:05

==== Command & Conquer: Red Alert ====
Command & Conquer Red Alert (Original Soundtrack) [Remastered]

Studio album by Frank Klepacki
- Released: 2020
- Genres: Video game soundtrack, industrial, industrial metal
- Label: EA Music
- Producer: EA Music

The Red Alert soundtrack comes on three discs, labelled "DISC_3", "DISC_4" and "DISC_5" in the physical edition.

The first Red Alert disc contains more or less the same tracks as the original soundtrack release.

The tracks "Run" was originally called "Run for Your Life". Likewise, "Twin Cannon" appeared in the original game as "Twin". Both tracks were named differently on the soundtrack CD, and appear in the Remaster soundtrack by their soundtrack name.

All tracks are written by Frank Klepacki.

Command & Conquer Red Alert (Original Soundtrack) [Remastered] Disc 1
No.	Title	Length
1.	"Hell March"	6:24
2.	"Intro Menu"	3:30
3.	"Bigfoot"	5:15
4.	"Crush"	3:49
5.	"Face The Enemy 1"	4:38
6.	"Run"	5:13
7.	"Trenches"	5:20
8.	"Workmen"	4:44
9.	"Mud"	4:49
10.	"Radio 2"	4:05
11.	"Roll Out"	3:55
12.	"Terminate"	5:21
13.	"Dense"	5:03
14.	"Vector"	4:18
15.	"Twin Cannon"	3:56
16.	"Militant Force"	1:50

The second Red Alert disc completes the base game's in-game music, and adds bonus tracks and music that was originally exclusive to the PlayStation Retaliation release. One track, "Twin Cannon Remix", is erroneously labelled as "Retaliation Remix", while it only appeared in the PC version, in the Counterstrike expansion pack. The remixed version of "Radio 2" appeared on the original game disc of Counterstrike in Red Book audio format behind the game data, but was not accessible inside the game. The track "Awaiting" was called "Await" in the original game, but was renamed in the Remaster.

All tracks are written by Frank Klepacki.

Command & Conquer (Original Soundtrack) [Remastered] Disc 2
No.	Title	Length
1.	"Red Alert Map Theme"	1:05
2.	"Awaiting"	4:25
3.	"Face The Enemy 2"	5:36
4.	"Fogger"	5:08
5.	"Snake"	4:43
6.	"Smash"	4:41
7.	"Reload Fire"	4:52
8.	"Surf No Mercy"	3:12
9.	"The Truth Is A Lie"	3:32
10.	"Hell March (Retaliation Remix)"	3:31
11.	"Radio 2 (Retaliation Remix)"	3:35
12.	"Mud (Retaliation Remix)"	4:47
13.	"Workmen (Retaliation Remix)"	3:25
14.	"Twin Cannon (Retaliation Remix)"	3:47
15.	"Crush (Retaliation Remix)"	3:42
16.	"No Mercy (Retaliation Remix)"	3:32
17.	"Hell March (Original Demo)"	3:38

The third Red Alert disc is labelled "Counterstrike & The Aftermath" in the physical release, and contains tracks of the game's expansion packs, plus another few bonus tracks.

All tracks are written by Frank Klepacki.

Command & Conquer (Original Soundtrack) [Remastered] Disc 3
No.	Title	Length
1.	"Bog"	3:36
2.	"Floating"	4:41
3.	"Gloom"	4:01
4.	"Groundwire"	3:54
5.	"Running Through Pipes / Mechanical Man 2"	4:41
6.	"The Search"	4:41
7.	"Traction"	4:01
8.	"Wasteland"	4:06
9.	"Arazoid"	4:26
10.	"Backstab"	4:47
11.	"Chaos"	4:17
12.	"Shut It"	4:27
13.	"The Second Hand"	4:35
14.	"Underlying Thoughts"	4:13
15.	"Voice Rhythm 2"	4:19
16.	"Journey"	4:30
17.	"The Plan"	3:16
18.	"Concrete"	3:58

==== Frank Klepacki & The Tiberian Sons: Celebrating 25 Years of Command & Conquer ====
Frank Klepacki & The Tiberian Sons: Celebrating 25 Years of Command & Conquer

Studio album by Frank Klepacki and The Tiberian Sons (Tony Dickinson, Travis Moberg, Connor Engstrom, Max Noel)
- Released: 2020
- Genres: Video game soundtrack, industrial, industrial metal
- Label: EA Music
- Producer: EA Music

Act on Instinct (Remastered)
Short clip of Act on Instinct — 641 KB

Specific for the Remastered Collection is an album of 22 tracks from the included games, Renegade, Tiberian Sun, Red Alert 2, the expansion Yuri's Revenge, and Red Alert 3. Made by Klepacki along with the fan band The Tiberian Sons, based on their performance at MAGFest 2019. This disc is labelled "DISC_6" in the physical release.

All tracks are written by Frank Klepacki.

Frank Klepacki & The Tiberian Sons: Celebrating 25 Years of Command & Conquer
No.	Title	Original Game(s)	Length
1.	"Act on Instinct"	Tiberian Dawn	2:48
2.	"Industrial"	Tiberian Dawn	2:54
3.	"Target / Mechanical Man"	Tiberian Dawn	3:02
4.	"Just Do It Up"	Tiberian Dawn	2:27
5.	"Prepare For Battle"	Tiberian Dawn	3:23
6.	"Rain in the Night"	Tiberian Dawn	3:44
7.	"Warfare / Full Stop"	Tiberian Dawn	3:12
8.	"Bigfoot"	Red Alert	5:37
9.	"Workmen"	Red Alert	4:24
10.	"Crush"	Red Alert	2:58
11.	"Militant Force"	Red Alert	2:14
12.	"Dusk Hour"	Tiberian Sun	3:54
13.	"Mad Rap"	Tiberian Sun	3:38
14.	"No Mercy"	Tiberian Dawn	3:19
15.	"Slave to the System"	Tiberian Sun: Firestorm	2:44
16.	"Got a Present For Ya"	Renegade	2:22
17.	"Grinder 1 & 2 Medley"	Red Alert 2 & 3	2:53
18.	"Blow it Up"	Red Alert 2	3:11
19.	"Brain Freeze"	Red Alert 2: Yuri's Revenge	4:17
20.	"Command & Conquer"	Renegade	3:03
21.	"Hell March"	Red Alert	3:34
22.	"Hell March 2 & 3 Medley"	Red Alert 2 & 3	4:12

== Reception and legacy ==
Before the release of Command & Conquer, the majority of video games used MIDI files and other similar formats for music as a way to save space. Westwood Studios was one of the first major developers to include actual full digitised audio files for that. Although these recordings were generally of low quality compared to modern mp3s, many credit Westwood for helping to popularize the concept.
