= AstroLOLogy =

Malaysian animated web series

- Genre: Silent comedy Slapstick
- Created by: Ken Foong
- Written by: Mark Gravas; Bradley Trevor Greive
- Directed by: Ken Foong
- Voices of: Lester Wong Tze Jiang; Au Yong Yuin Yii; Archana Sanmuganatham; Haizal Halim; Hafeez Aziz; Steven Bones; Siti Nursabrina Saiful Bahri
- Composers: Clinton Liew; Yong An Ting
- Country of origin: Malaysia
- No. of seasons: 2
- No. of episodes: 288

Production
- Executive producers: Ken Foong; Ken Lai; Wong Cheng Fei
- Running time: 2 mins
- Production company: Lemon Sky Studios

Original release
- Network: YouTube

AstroLOLogy (a portmanteau of "Astrology" and "LOL") is a CGI animated comedy web series produced by Lemon Sky Studios.It was released on YouTube on 3 August 2018. Consisting of 2 seasons, each season has 12 chapters. Each chapter was released each month and contains 12 episodes each starring one character. There are 288 episodes altogether. Each episode runs for 2 minutes

The series contains no dialogue and tells its stories through visuals. However, despite it originally being a web series, it has been given a Japanese dub to air on J:COM with the name “アストロロロジー ～おかしな12星座うらない～”. It has also been given a Chinese dub to be acquired by Chinese streaming service Tencent Video. The show has also been acquired by the Spanish-based company Imira Entertainment for its distribution slate ahead of MIPTV Media Market in 2018.

Although the show has no dialogue, it uses the voices of Lester Wong Tze Jiang (As Aries and Capricorn), Haishal Hailzil Hailmi (Aquarius), Hafeez Aziz (Leo and Libra), Santosh Lograndan (Taurus), Archana Shanmuganatham (Cancer), Steven Bones (Gemini and Scorpio), Siti Nursabrina Saiful Bahri (Virgo) and Au Yoong Yuin Yii (Pisces and Sagittarius). The voices are used for interjections.

== Production ==
Production for AstroLOLogy began in 2015. Ken Foong has stated that while he primarily targeted the series AstroLOLogy at ages 8–12, he intended the series to appeal and relate to any age group, globally. According to Foong, while coming up with an idea for the synopsis of the series, his goal was to create a series with a cast of characters that ‘made up people's identity’. Some ideas that have been considered were Blood Type characters and the Chinese Zodiac, but he eventually stuck with the idea of the Greek Zodiac signs because that concept was understood and recognised worldwide.Slapstick humour was added to the show to make it more comical to viewers. A 2D version for AstroLOLogy was tested, but the reception for the 3D version was better.

AstroLOLogy is now known as the first comedic series to be based on zodiac signs.

== Synopsis ==
The show focuses on the 12 zodiac signs from Greek mythology transformed into human-like characters with memorable personalities. Each character's design and personality is loosely based on their zodiac sign's archetypes. Focusing on slapstick and situational humour, each chapter contains 12 episodes with each focusing on one zodiac sign's key trait. Being a show with short skits about zodiac signs ending up in nonsensical situations, a key trait about the starred character is shown as a message at the end, allowing viewers to learn about some stereotypical characteristics about the signs.

== Chapters ==
=== Season 1 ===
1. Rom-antics

2. Cat-astrophe

3. On Duty

4. Off Duty

5. Starry Nights

6. On the Move

7. Holiyay!

8. Fit and Funtastic

9. A LOL a Day Keeps the Doctor away

10. Happy Ahh-LOL-ween

11. Gadgets and Gizmos

12. The Jolliest Time of the Year

=== Season 2 ===
1. Love Is In the Air

2. At the Ahh-musement Park

3. AthLOLtics

4. Astrordinary talent show

5. TechnoLOLogy

6. Past Time Fun

7. FoodoLOLogy

8. Animal Adventure

9. Caped Crusaders

10. Paranormal AstroLOLogy

11. A Very Fairy AstroLOLogy

12. AstroLOLogical Celebration

== Reception ==
AstroLOLogy has gained over 210 million views and 639,000 subscribers after being released on YouTube in 2018. In 2020, Ken Foong stated that the show has received viewership from multiple countries, with the top viewers (17% of viewers) being from the US.

AstroLOLogy has also took home several awards which are the:

Best animation short at the London Independent Film Awards 2020

Best Web Series at the Los Angeles Film Awards 2020 in March

Best Web Series at the Latitude Film Awards 2020

Best Children Short at the Independent Short Awards

Best Web series at the Global Shorts

Best Animated Short film at the Asian Cinematography Awards 2020 in April

Best Animated web series at the New York Animation Film Awards 2020

Award of Excellence for Best Animation at the Vegas Movie Awards 2020

Hasnul Hadi Samsidin, The Vice President of MDEC (Malaysia Digital Economy Coorporation) Digital Creative Content, praised Lemon Sky Studios for the achievements of their original IP.

== Miscellaneous ==
=== Roblox game ===
In 2022, the official AstroLOLogy YouTube channel posted a video announcing the release of their then-upcoming Roblox game titled ‘AstroLOLogy Adventure Obby’. In this Adventure Obby game, players try to go through an obstacle course using tools as well as challenge their friends to race with them. It was released once the video earned 1,000 likes.

=== Arcade game ===
In 2024, Arcade game manufacturer and designer Zooom Studios released a Coin pusher game named AstroLOLogy based on the cartoon with the same name. Distributed by PrimeTime Amusements, the 2-player game challenges players to unlock a ‘zodiac ball’ by hitting the best targets using marbles. Pushing a button releases a marble, then players must time it so that it falls into one of three moving targets on the bottom.After a marble lands in one of the holes,it lights up.The goal is to light up all three holes to spin the wheel for a chance to release ‘zodiac balls’.
