= Lemon Sky Studios =

Malaysian animation company

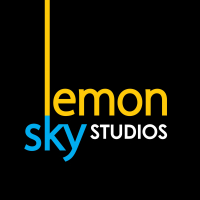
- Type: Private
- Industry: Art Outsourcing, game development, 3D animation
- Founded: 2006
- Headquarters: Kuala Lumpur, Malaysia
- Number of employees: 500
- Parent: iCandy Interactive Limited
- Website: lemonskystudios.com

Lemon Sky Studios is a computer-generated imagery studio that produces art for animation and video game titles, based in Kuala Lumpur, Malaysia. The company is best known for outsourcing computer animation and art project for major video game titles such as Final Fantasy VII Remake, Resident Evil: Resistance, Warcraft III: Reforged, StarCraft: Remastered, Uncharted: The Lost Legacy, Marvel's Spider-Man, and Gears of War 5. The studio also involved in animation series such as TruckTown and Nickelodeon's Middle School Moguls.

== Organization ==
Lemon Sky's production team is made up of over 450 artists and production staff.

The studio's headquarters is located in Kuala Lumpur, Malaysia, with an additional branch located in the city of Penang.

The studio was acquired and is currently fully owned by ASX-listed game studio, iCandy Interactive Limited.

The studio's co-founders, Cheng-Fei Wong and Ken Foong, were given a management contract to serve the studios post acquisition, but they left early ahead of the expiry of the management contract.

== Legal action against former executives ==
In November 2024, Lemon Sky Studios, via its parent company iCandy Interactive Limited, announced that Lemon Sky Studios had initiated legal action against Cheng-Fei Wong and Ka King Foong, the former executives of Lemon Sky Studios. The lawsuit, filed in the High Court of Malaya in Kuala Lumpur, Malaysia, alleges several breaches of fiduciary duties, breaches of trust, and other unlawful actions.

The legal action stems from an internal review and forensic audit conducted by Lemon Sky Studios The investigation revealed suspicious transactions involving an undisclosed privately held Malaysian company called Momodica Sdn. Bhd., which was allegedly majority-owned by Wong and Foong.

According to iCandy Interactive, Wong and Foong allegedly arranged for Lemon Sky Studios to pay Momodica RM1,505,750 (approximately A$524,542) irrespective of the quality or quantity of sub-contracting work undertaken.

Amidst controversies and facing legal actions, Wong and Foong started a Malaysian studio called Spiky Things Studio immediately after leaving Lemon Sky Studios.

== Milestones ==
=== 2006 ===
- Founders Cheng-Fei Wong and Ken Foong establish their first game art studio, Igloo Digital Arts. The studio becomes the first Malaysian company to work on in-game assets.

=== 2008 ===
- The studio contributes work to its first AAA game project, Afro Samurai, and its first TV animation project, Buzzy Bee.

=== 2010 ===
- Igloo Digital Arts is restructured and officially renamed Lemon Sky.

=== 2014 ===
- Lemon Sky signs a Memorandum of Understanding with Bandai Namco Malaysia to facilitate development of future games.

=== 2015 ===
- Lemon Sky launches a second studio in Penang under the name of Lemon Sky North.

=== 2017 ===
- Lemon Sky celebrates its 10-year anniversary with Hello Lemon Sky, an event inviting the public to visit the studio and learn from experienced artists.

=== 2018 ===
- Lemon Sky debuts AstroLOLogy, its first original animation IP.
- Electronic Arts announces its partnership with Lemon Sky on Command & Conquer Remastered Collection.

=== 2019 ===
- Lemon Sky wins Exporter of the Year and Gold Awards for the Services (Mid-Tier) Category in the Export Excellence Awards 2019.

=== 2020 ===
- As part of its rapid expansion, Lemon Sky moves to its new headquarters in UOA Business Park.

=== 2021 ===
- AstroLOLogy gains 1 million subscribers on YouTube.
- iCandy Interactive Ltd acquires Lemon Sky.
- Lemon Sky wins a Gold Award for the Services (Mid-Tier and Large) Category in the Export Excellence Awards 2021.

=== 2022 ===
- Lemon Sky receives its ISO 2700 certification.
- Lemon Sky announces the development of its original video game IP, Metal Genesis.
- Lemon Sky wins a Gold Award for the Services (Mid-Tier and Large) Category in the Export Excellence Awards 2022.

=== 2024 ===
- Lemon Sky Studios announced the early departure of CEO and COO, with a management transition led by Executive Director Mr Kin Wai Lau.
- Lemon Sky Studios initiated legal action against former executives of Lemon Sky Studio, Mr Cheng-Fei Wong and Mr Ken Foong for alleged breaches of fiduciary duties and financial misconduct. Lemon Sky Studio assures zero impact on all ongoing projects.

== Video game projects ==
Title	Release year	Developer	Publisher
Go Vacation	2011	Bandai Namco Entertainment	Nintendo, BANDAI NAMCO Entertainment, Namco Bandai Games America Inc.
The Sims FreePlay	2011	Maxis, Firemonkeys Studios, EA Mobile, Blue Tongue Entertainment	Electronic Arts
Sonic & All-Stars Racing Transformed	2012	Sumo Digital	SEGA
SimCity	2013	Maxis	Electronic Arts
Shadow of the Eternals	2013	Quantum Entanglement	Quantum Entanglement
War of Legions	2013	Ateam	Ateam
Outrace	2013	Yubi Games	Yubi Games
Game of War: Fire Age	2013	Machine Zone	Machine Zone
FIFA 14	2013	Electronic Arts	Electronic Arts
NBA 2K14	2013	2K Sports	2K Sports
Call of Duty: Ghosts	2013	Infinity Ward	Activision
Dead Rising 3	2013	Capcom	Microsoft Studios
Dead Rising 3: Apocalypse Edition	2014	Capcom	Capcom
Soulcalibur: Lost Swords	2014	Project Soul	Bandai Namco
Omega Quintet	2014	Idea Factory	Idea Factory, Compile Heart
Dark Souls II	2014	FromSoftware	Bandai Namco
MLB 14: The Show	2014	San Diego Studio	Sony Computer Entertainment
NBA 2K15	2014	Visual Concepts	2K Sports
Dark Souls II: Scholar of the First Sin	2015	FromSoftware	Bandai Namco
Bloodborne	2015	FromSoftware	Sony Interactive Entertainment
Final Fantasy XIV: Heavensward	2015	Square Enix	Square Enix
World of Tanks	2015	Wargaming	Wargaming
Gears of War: Ultimate Edition	2015	The Coalition, Epic Games	Microsoft Studios
Tales of Zestiria	2015	Bandai Namco	Bandai Namco
NBA 2K16	2015	Visual Concepts	2K Sports
WWE 2K16	2015	Yuke's	2K Games
Need for Speed: Edge	2015	EA Korea	Tencent, Nexon, Nexon Korea
Disney Magical World 2	2015	Bandai Namco	Nintendo, Bandai Namco
Big Bang Galaxy	2015	Ateam Inc.	Ateam Inc.
Vega Conflict	2015	KIXEYE	KIXEYE
Dark Souls III	2016	FromSoftware	FromSoftware
NBA 2K17	2016	Visual Concepts Entertainment	2K Sports
Valkyrie Connect	2016	Ateam Inc.	Ateam Inc.
Pirates: Treasure Hunters	2016	Virtual Toys	Virtual Toys
Tales of Berseria	2016	Bandai Namco	Bandai Namco
WWE 2K17	2016	Visual Concepts, Yukes	2K Sports
Gears of War 4	2016	The Coalition	Microsoft Studios
Sword Art Online: Hollow Realization	2016	Aquria	Bandai Namco
Call of Duty: Infinite Warfare	2016	Infinity Ward	Activision
Dead Rising 4	2016	Capcom	Microsoft Studios, Capcom
Gravity Rush 2	2017	Project Siren, Sony Interactive Entertainment	Sony Interactive Entertainment
Tales of Berseria	2017	Bandai Namco	Bandai Namco
Mario Sports Superstars	2017	Bandai Namco, Camelot Software Planning	Nintendo
MLB The Show 17	2017	San Diego Studio	Sony Interactive Entertainment
The Elder Scrolls: Legends	2017	Dire Wolf Digital, Sparkypants Studios	Bethesda Softworks
Final Fantasy XV: A New Empire	2017	Machine Zone	Machine Zone, Epic Action LLC
Final Fantasy XIV: Stormblood	2017	Square Enix	Square Enix
Tekken 7	2017	Bandai Namco Studios	Bandai Namco Entertainment
StarCraft: Remastered	2017	Blizzard Entertainment	Blizzard Entertainment
Uncharted: The Lost Legacy	2017	Naughty Dog	Sony Interactive Entertainment
WWE 2K18	2017	Yuke's, Visual Concepts	2K Sports
Marvel's Spider-Man	2018	Insomniac Games	Sony Interactive Entertainment
WWE 2K19	2018	Yuke's, Visual Concepts	2K Games, 2K Sports
Diablo III: Eternal Collection (Nintendo Switch)	2018	Blizzard Entertainment	Blizzard Entertainment
Mist Gears	2018	Tri-Ace	Alim Co.Ltd.
The Grand Tour Game	2019	Amazon Game Studios	Amazon Game Studios, Heavy Iron Studios
Anthem	2019	BioWare, Bioware Austin LLC	Electronic Arts
Mortal Kombat 11	2019	NetherRealm Studios, Shiver Entertainment, QLOC, Shiver	Warner Bros. Interactive Entertainment
Final Fantasy XIV: Shadowbringers	2019	Square Enix	Square Enix
Teppen	2019	GungHo Online	GungHo Online
Gears 5	2019	The Coalition	Xbox Game Studios
WWE 2K20	2019	Yuke's, Visual Concepts	2K Games, 2K Sports
Warcraft III: Reforged	2020	Blizzard Entertainment	Blizzard Entertainment
Resident Evil: Resistance	2020	Capcom, NeoBards Entertainment Ltd.	Capcom
Final Fantasy VII Remake	2020	Square Enix	Square Enix
Command & Conquer Remastered Collection	2020	Lemon Sky Studios, Petroglyph Games	Electronic Arts
The Last of Us Part II	2020	Naughty Dog	Sony Interactive Entertainment
Wasteland 3	2020	inXile Entertainment	inXile Entertainment
Marvel's Avengers	2020	Crystal Dynamics	Square Enix
Baldur's Gate III	2020	Larian Studios NV	Larian Studios NV
Need for Speed: Hot Pursuit - Remastered	2020	Stellar Entertainment Software	Electronic Arts
Marvel's Spider-Man: Miles Morales	2020	Insomniac Games	Sony Interactive Entertainment America
Marvel's Spider-Man Remastered	2020	Insomniac Games	Sony Interactive Entertainment America
Demon's Souls	2020	Bluepoint Games	Sony Interactive Entertainment Japan Studio
Marvel Strike Force	2021	Scopely	Scopely
Overwatch 2	2021	Blizzard Entertainment	Blizzard Entertainment
Mass Effect: Legendary Edition	2021	Electronic Arts	Electronic Arts
Ratchet & Clank: Rift Apart	2021	Insomniac Games	Sony Interactive Entertainment
Diablo II: Resurrected	2021	Blizzard Entertainment	Blizzard Entertainment
Fire Emblem Warriors: Three Hopes	2022	Intelligent Systems, Omega Force	Nintendo
Rumbleverse	2022	Iron Galaxy	Epic Games
Saints Row	2022	Volition	Deep Silver
The Last of Us Part 1	2022	Naughty Dog	Sony Interactive Entertainment
Gundam Evolution	2022	Bandai Namco Online	Bandai Namco Entertainment
Star Ocean: The Divine Force	2022	tri-Ace	Square Enix
Warlander	2023	Toylogic	Plaion
Forspoken	2023	Luminous Productions	Square Enix
Hi-Fi Rush	2023	Tango Gameworks	Bethesda Softworks, Krafton
The Settlers: New Allies	2023	Ubisoft Düsseldorf	Ubisoft
Wild Hearts	2023	Omega Force	Electronic Arts
Wo Long: Fallen Dynasty	2023	Team Ninja	Koei Tecmo
The Sandbox	2023	TSB Gaming	TSB Gaming
Monopoly Go!	2023	Scopely	Scopely
Redfall	2023	Arkane Austin	Bethesda Softworks
Street Fighter 6	2023	Capcom	Capcom
Final Fantasy XVI	2023	Square Enix	Square Enix
Exoprimal	2023	Capcom	Capcom
Armored Core VI: Fires of Rubicon	2023	FromSoftware	FromSoftware, Bandai Namco Entertainment
Baldur's Gate 3	2023	Larian Studios	Larian Studios
Marvel's Spider-Man 2	2023	Insomniac Games	Sony Interactive Entertainment
The Last of Us Part II Remastered	2024	Naughty Dog	Sony Interactive Entertainment
Rise of the Rōnin	2024	Koei Tecmo	Sony Interactive Entertainment
What If...? – An Immersive Story	2024	ILM Immersive, Lucasfilm Ltd	Marvel Studios, ILM Immersive, Apple
Stormgate	2024	Frost Giant Studios	Frost Giant Studios
[REDACTED]	2024	Striking Distance Studios	KRAFTON
Star Fox	2026	Velan Studios	Nintendo
Marvel's Wolverine	2026	Insomniac Games	Sony Interactive Entertainment
Rayman Legends Retold	2026	Ubisoft Milan, Ubisoft Montpillier	Ubisoft

== Animation projects ==
Title	Release year	Publisher
Buzzy Bee and Friends	2009	TV 2 (New Zealand)
Surfer Girl	2013	Surfer Girl
Sydney Sailboat	2014	ABC 4 Kids (Australia), 3e (Ireland), Tiny Pop (UK), Raydar Media
TruckTown	2014	Treehouse TV (Canada), Tiny Pop (UK)
Gummandos	2015	Spin Master
Pumpkin Reports	2015	Nickelodeon, Qubo, Rai Gulp
Future-Worm!	2016	Disney
Ocean Groove with Maestro Ning	2018	Genting
AstroLOLogy	2018	Lemon Sky Animation
Tinpo	2018	American Greetings Entertainment
Knights of the Zodiac: Saint Seiya	2019	Toei Animation
Middle School Moguls	2019	Nickelodeon
Spookadilly	2019	Genting
Big City Greens	2020	Disney
Santiago of the Seas	2020	Nickelodeon
Battle Kitty	2022	Netflix
Not Quite Narwhal	2023	DreamWorks Animation (Netflix)
Pokémon: Path to the Peak	2023	The Pokémon Company
Playdate with Winnie the Pooh	2023	Disney Junior
Mighty MonsterWheelies	2024	DreamWorks Animation (Netflix)
Aniimo Official Reveal Trailer	2025	FunPlus

== Controversies ==
In March 2021, game journalist Chris Bratt from People Make Games interviewed 19 current and former employee from Lemon Sky Studios and Indonesia-based animation studio Brandoville regarding working conditions. The testimonial from employees revealed that Lemon Sky Studios allegedly put its artists through unpaid overtime and had them work weekends to meet tight deadlines from triple-A clients. The higher-ups allegedly used passive-aggressive methods to pressure Lemon Sky artists to work overtime. Lemon Sky Studios denied the allegations as "factually and legally inaccurate" and "are surprised that such allegations are targeted at Lemon Sky", stating they abide all Malaysian employment laws. Lemon Sky Studios also stated they will "take appropriate measures in response", include "obtaining feedback from all of our employees regarding their individual concerns".
