= Aesthetic (TripleS EP) =

- Digital cover

EP by Krystal Eyes
- Released: May 4, 2023
- Genre: K-pop
- Length: 15:23
- Language: Korean; English
- Label: Modhaus; Kakao

TripleS chronology
Assemble (2023)	Aesthetic (2023)	Cherry Gene (2023)

Singles from Aesthetic
- 1. "Cherry Talk" Released: May 4, 2023; 2. "Touch+" Released: June 27, 2023

Aesthetic is the first extended play by South Korean girl group Krystal Eyes, a sub-unit of TripleS consisting of members Yoon Seo-yeon, Lee Ji-woo, Kim Chae-yeon, and Kim Soo-min. It was released on May 4, 2023, by Modhaus and distributed by Kakao Entertainment. The album contains five tracks, including the title track "Cherry Talk".

== Promotion and release ==
On September 16, it was announced that TripleS would begin preparing for sub-unit debut activities with each unit having 4 members. The two sub-units were named Acid Angel From Asia and Krystal Eyes, with Acid Angel From Asia having their debut activities first in October. The lineup was voted by fans and Acid Angel From Asia made their official debut with the first extended play Access on October 28, 2022.

On March 17, 2023, it was confirmed that Krystal Eyes, the second sub-unit will debut on the first week of May.

== Track listing ==
Aesthetic track listing
No.	Title	Lyrics	Music	Arrangement	Length
1.	"Cherry 100%" (sung by Lee Ji-woo and Kim Chae-yeon)		Yoon Jong Sung; pdly		0:47
2.	"Cherry Talk"	Yelo; Kwon Ae Jin; Jaden Jeong	Yoon Jong Sung; Kwon; Yelo; Pdly; Kella Armitage	Yoon; Pdly	2:51
3.	"Touch"	Jaden Jeong	Hymax; Hong-di; Limzy	Hymax; Hong-di; Limzy	2:56
4.	"Hide & Seek" (Korean: 숨겨 봐봐; RR: sumgyeo bwabwa; lit. Hide it)	Pdly; Yelo	Yoon; Kwon Ae Jin; Yelo; Pdly	Yoon; pdly	2:54
5.	"Deja-Vu"	Park So-hyun; Jaden Jeong; Jeon Ji Eun (lalala studio); Lua; Fuxxy; Any Masingga (VILLAINX)	Fuxxy; Masingga; Park; Lua	Fuxxy; Masingga; Park	2:52
6.	"Dimension" (KRE Version)	Yi Yi Jin; Jeong; Choi Young Kyung	Badd; San (VENDORS); Isa Guerra; Fuxxy	Badd; Fuxxy	3:03
Total length:					15:23

== Charts ==
=== Weekly charts ===
Weekly chart performance for Aesthetic
Chart (2023)	Peak position
South Korean Albums (Circle)	8

=== Monthly charts ===
Monthly chart performance for Aesthetic
Chart (2023)	Peak position
South Korean Albums (Circle)	28

== Release history ==
Release history and formats for Access
Region	Date	Format	Label
South Korea	May 5, 2023	CD; digital download; streaming	ModHaus; Kakao Entertainment
Various	May 5, 2023	Digital download; streaming	ModHaus; Kakao Entertainment
