= The First Decade (album) =

Greatest hits album by April Wine
- Released: 1989
- Genre: Rock, hard rock
- Length: 67:09
- Label: Aquarius
- Producer: Ralph Murphy, Gene Cornish, Dino Danelli, Myles Goodwyn

April Wine chronology
We Like to Rock (1988)	The First Decade (1989)	Oowatanite (1990)

Professional ratings
Review scores
Source	Rating
Allmusic	4/5 stars

The First Decade is a compilation album by the Canadian rock band April Wine, released in 1989. It contains four previously unreleased tracks.

== Track listing ==
All tracks written by Myles Goodwyn unless otherwise noted.

1. "It's a Pleasure to See You Again" (G. Moffet) – *previously unreleased
2. "Bad Side of the Moon" (Elton John, Bernie Taupin)
3. "Drop Your Guns" (D. Henman)
4. "Lady Run, Lady Hide" (M. Goodwyn, J. Clench)
5. "Electric Jewels" (M. Goodwyn, J. Clench)
6. "Cum Hear the Band"
7. "Slow Poke"
8. "The Whole World's Goin' Crazy"
9. "Lovin' You"
10. "Baby it's You" – *previously unreleased
11. "Somebody Like You" – *previously unreleased
12. "Am I in Love" – *previously unreleased
13. "Forever for Now"
14. "Wings of Love"
15. "Marjorie"
16. "Child's Garden"
17. "Mama Laye"
18. "Coming Right Down on Top of Me"

== Personnel ==
- Myles Goodwyn – guitar, vocals, keyboards
- David Henman – guitar, vocals
- Gary Moffet – guitars, vocals
- Brian Greenway – guitar, vocals
- Jim Clench – bass, vocals
- Ritchie Henman – drums & percussion
- Jerry Mercer – drums & percussion, vocals
