= Command & Conquer: The First Decade =

- Cover art
- Developers: EA Los Angeles, Barking Lizards Technologies, Base Camp Films, Gametap Entertainment, Westwood Studios
- Publisher: Electronic Arts
- Platform: Microsoft Windows
- Release: NA: February 7, 2006; EU: February 17, 2006
- Genres: Real-time strategy, first-person shooter
- Modes: Single-player, multiplayer

Command & Conquer: The First Decade is a compilation of the Command & Conquer series' games published from 1995 to 2003, bundled onto one DVD and updated to run optimally on Windows XP. It was released on February 7, 2006. Included in the compilation was a bonus DVD with a look behind the scenes of the franchise, including interviews with producers, concept art, various soundbites, as well as a montage of the winning fan videos of the "Are You The Biggest C&C Fan?" competition held prior to the compilation's release.

Other items included in the compilation was a poster with high-quality C&C renders on both sides, one of which has been confirmed to be a teaser image for EA's Command & Conquer 3: Tiberium Wars, as well as a manual that features unit descriptions and hotkeys for each of the included games.

== Included games and expansions ==
- Command & Conquer – September 1995
  - Command & Conquer – The Covert Operations – April 1996
- Command & Conquer: Red Alert – November 1996
  - Command & Conquer: Red Alert – Counterstrike – March 1997
  - Command & Conquer: Red Alert – The Aftermath – September 1997
- Command & Conquer: Tiberian Sun – August 1999
  - Command & Conquer: Tiberian Sun – Firestorm – March 2000
- Command & Conquer: Red Alert 2 – October 2000
  - Command & Conquer: Yuri's Revenge – October 2001
- Command & Conquer: Renegade – February 2002
- Command & Conquer: Generals – February 2003
  - Command & Conquer: Generals – Zero Hour – September 2003

== Reception ==
Reception

Aggregate score
Aggregator	Score
Metacritic	71/100

The First Decade received a "Silver" sales award from the Entertainment and Leisure Software Publishers Association (ELSPA), indicating sales of at least 100,000 copies in the United Kingdom.
