= Aesthetic (From First to Last EP) =

EP by From First to Last
- Released: August 11, 2003
- Recorded: 2002 – 2003
- Studio: Earthsound Recording Studios
- Genres: Post-hardcore; melodic hardcore; emo; screamo
- Length: 21:52
- Label: Four Leaf Recordings
- Producers: Lee Dyess; From First to Last

From First to Last chronology
The Silent Treatment (2000)	Aesthetic (2003)	Dear Diary, My Teen Angst Has a Body Count (2004)

Singles from Aesthetic
- 1. "Such a Tragedy" Released: March 18, 2003; 2. "Regrets and Romance" Released: July 4, 2003; 3. "My Heart, Your Hands" Released: November 10, 2003

Aesthetic is the debut EP by American rock band From First to Last, released in 2003. It was the band's first release before their first full-length album, Dear Diary, My Teen Angst Has a Bodycount.

== Track listing ==
All tracks are written by From First to Last.

No.	Title	Length
1.	"Such a Tragedy"	3:08
2.	"..."	0:27
3.	"For the Taking"	3:39
4.	"Regrets and Romance"	3:51
5.	"When Flying Feels Like Falling"	2:51
6.	"Ultimatums for Egos"	3:31
7.	"My Heart, Your Hands"	4:20
Total length:		21:52

== Personnel ==
From First to Last

- Phillip Reardon – lead vocals, unclean vocals, keyboards
- Matt Good – vocals, lead guitar, backing vocals
- Travis Richter – unclean vocals, rhythm guitar backing vocals
- Joey Antillion – bass guitar
- Derek Bloom – drums, percussion

Additional musicians

- Maria Haycraft – vocals on "For the Taking" and "Regrets and Romance".

Additional personnel

- Lee Dyess – engineering, production, mixing
- Adam Krause – photography
- Burn It Down Media – artwork, layout
