= Command & Conquer 3: Tiberium Wars =

2007 video game

- Developer: EA Los Angeles (Note: Mac OS X version developed by TransGaming)
- Publisher: Electronic Arts
- Producer: Amer Ajami
- Designer: Jason Bender
- Programmer: Austin Ellis
- Artists: Matt J. Britton; Adam McCarthy
- Writer: Brent Friedman
- Composers: Steve Jablonsky; Trevor Morris
- Engine: SAGE
- Platforms: Microsoft Windows, Xbox 360, Mac OS X, J2ME
- Release: Windows: NA: March 26, 2007; AU: March 28, 2007; EU: March 29, 2007; UK: March 30, 2007; Xbox 360: NA: May 10, 2007; EU: May 11, 2007; Mac OS X: NA: August 28, 2007
- Genre: Real-time strategy
- Modes: Single-player, multiplayer

Command & Conquer 3: Tiberium Wars is a 2007 science fiction real-time strategy video game developed and published by Electronic Arts for Windows, Mac OS X and Xbox 360 platforms, and released internationally in March 2007. Additionally, the game can be purchased from the Xbox digital store and played on Xbox One and Xbox Series consoles through the Xbox backwards compatibility program.

The game is a direct sequel to the 1999 game Command & Conquer: Tiberian Sun, and takes place roughly seventeen years after the game's expansion pack Firestorm, in which Tiberium has grown to become a considerable threat to the planet, leading to the world's political borders and territories being remade into zones denoting the level of contamination by the alien substance. The game's story sees the Global Defense Initiative and the Brotherhood of Nod engage in a new global conflict, this time as major superpowers, only for the war to attract the attention of a new extraterrestrial faction known as the Scrin, which attacks both sides while harvesting Tiberium for its own purpose.

The game brought about several changes in gameplay, some introduced in Command & Conquer: Red Alert 2, including garrisonable structures, neutral tech buildings, unit upgrades and veteran levels, and special powers unique for each playable faction. Other modes include a skirmish battle mode and multiplayer games. The game received favorable reviews, and proved a commercial success following its launch, with a stand-alone expansion pack released a year later on March 24, 2008, titled Command & Conquer 3: Kane's Wrath.

== Gameplay ==
Command & Conquer 3 features returning aspects of gameplay from the previous series. The player oversees the action, ordering multiple units to move and attack targets. The construction yard, a movable base, is the central platform from which the player constructs other structures. Certain structures can then produce units and resources are needed in order to fund the continuous building of structures and units. Typically the player's primary goal is to defeat an enemy by assaulting and destroying their base, while defending their own.

A supporting structure, a crane, can be constructed which can also construct structures. Thus, when multiple production structures of the same type, such as cranes and barracks, are built, the player is given more queues from which to train and produce units and structures. Though these simultaneously save time, funds are deducted for the extra cost as well; careful management of production, training units and funds are key to strategy. When a structure is built, the player can select anywhere near an existing structure to place it, gaining more territorial control.

Tiberium is the sole resource and is usually gathered from fields of Tiberium crystals scattered around the map. The crystals are gathered by harvester vehicles which unload their cargo into refineries, supplying the player with credits which are then automatically used when training units and building structures. Certain maps also feature Tiberium spikes, which, when captured by the faction's engineer unit, allocate a certain number of funds per second. Other neutral structures, such as an EMP weapon, are also present on maps to be captured. Base defense is provided by specialized defensive towers which are placed within a structure's territory.

All three factions have structures and units with similar functions at their disposal. However, they are adjusted to fit each faction's theme and have somewhat varying properties. Units can be classified into infantry, vehicles and aircraft, each with their own specialities. Unit effectiveness against opponents follows the rock-paper-scissors principle found in most real-time strategy games. Virtually every type of structure in the game acts as a tech tree and additional units, structures and faction-specific abilities will become available to research and create as new structures are built. Production and construction may become temporarily blocked if the required structures are destroyed, or if they are not provided with adequate power by the supporting "power plant" structures. A highly destructive superweapon for each faction can also be constructed and used after a certain timer expires. Once used, the timer must expire again before the superweapon can be activated for an additional time.

There are three factions playable in the game. The Global Defense Initiative fights with conventional modern weapons and tactics, utilizing both technologically advanced armor and firepower, making them typically more destructive in open confrontations, but more cumbersome. GDI's special weapon is the Ion Cannon, an orbital laser-guided energy strike. The Brotherhood of Nod features flexible guerrilla warfare forces, using stealth and Tiberium-based weaponry, though they are typically weaker. Like in the original Command & Conquer, their superweapon is Temple of Nod (Nuclear Missile Silo). The third faction, the alien Scrin, features units and structures that are Tiberium based, including the ability to promote the growth of the substance and to store infinite amounts of it. The Scrin are immune to the radioactive effects of Tiberium but vulnerable to anti-Tiberium weapons. Their superweapon is the "Rift Generator", which summons a vortex that generate a wormhole pulls anything near it into space

=== Single-player ===
The story driven single-player mode of Command & Conquer 3 consists of 38 missions, spread over three campaigns (17 GDI missions, 17 Brotherhood of Nod missions, and 4 Scrin missions). Each campaign depicts the view of its respective faction on the globalized "Third Tiberium War", with the portrayed story being furthered by full motion video cutscenes which play in between each of the individual campaign missions. Players can select to start with either the Global Defense Initiative or the Brotherhood of Nod campaign. Both campaigns of the traditional two factions are required to be completed before the bonus campaign of the new third Scrin faction is unlocked and becomes playable.

Each campaign mission features main objectives, the completion of which will instantly end the mission successfully. Several optional bonus objectives are also available to be completed. Completing optional objectives usually gives the player a tactical advantage in order to complete the main objectives or provides reinforcements or supplies upon completion. All campaign missions can separately be given a difficulty rating on the "theater" screen before they are started; the available difficulty settings range from "Easy" to "Normal" to "Hard". As the player progresses through one of the campaigns, new entries in the game's "Intelligence Database" become unlocked, providing the player with additional background information on the storyline, the factions, as well as their units and structures. Several of these database entries require the player to complete the bonus objectives of the various missions before they can be accessed. When a player completes a mission, they are awarded a medal on the campaign screen, which progresses to gold if completed on the hardest difficulty. Two extra ribbon decorations are also attained on the medal if the player completes the bonus objectives and finds the intelligence. All cutscenes which the player has unlocked by progressing through the campaigns are made available for viewing at any time within the game's menu.

The skirmish mode in Tiberium Wars is essentially the game's arena or sandbox mode, where the player chooses teams and factions to battle against until the enemy's base is destroyed. Numerous AI settings embody a type – or a combination of types – of classic RTS strategies, such as "turtler", "rusher" and "steamroller". These behavioral settings can additionally be given a difficulty rating ranging from "Easy" to "Medium" to "Hard" to "Brutal", along with "handicap" settings that can be applied to either the AI, the player, or both. Whenever a skirmish mission is successfully completed, a star is placed next to the map in the skirmish menu, showing that the player has won the skirmish on a certain difficulty level.

=== Multiplayer ===
Command and Conquer 3: Tiberium Wars supports multiplayer games over LAN, and online play, originally over GameSpy servers. After the shutdown of GameSpy in 2014, community-based alternatives were developed.

Players can participate in "1v1", "2v2", and clan-based "1v1" and "2v2" ladders – each using separate Elo rating systems – or they can elect to play unranked. Broadband-based multiplayer features VoIP support.

==== BattleCast ====
Electronic Arts was making an attempt through Command & Conquer 3: Tiberium Wars to market "RTS as a sport", through a project entitled "BattleCast". A service centered on the game's official website, "BattleCast" is designed to allow for players to schedule upcoming games with others, to spectate in games that are being played, and to serve as a centralized replay archive of matches. "BattleCast" additionally allows for players to function as commentators in a game, providing a running description of the match as it unfolds. Commentators can talk to other observers of a game through "BattleCast", and use a Paint-style brush to draw onto the screen.

A free "BattleCast Viewer" is available for download from the official C&C website. This viewer will allow for people who do not own the game to watch others playing. Player may also download custom maps.

== Plot ==
=== Setting ===
Command & Conquer 3: Tiberium Wars takes place within an alternate timeline, in which an alien substance called Tiberium lands on Earth in the 1990s and begins terra-forming the planet's ecology and landscape. Although the substance creates crystals containing precious metals leached from the surrounding soils, the process also transforms all plant life into alien flora that produces fatally toxic gas. By the 2040s, the planet's ecological state has reached a critical level, making a number of locations uninhabitable for humans, and generating often violent ion storms that have left several major cities erecting storm barriers to counter these. Since its arrival, Tiberium has become of interest to two factions – the Global Defense Initiative (GDI), who seek to combat the spread and eradicate its presence; and the Brotherhood of Nod, who believes the substance heralds the next step of evolution for humanity, based on the prophecies and lessons by its enigmatic leader Kane.

By the mid-2040s, all countries in the world cease to maintain political presence, either from social and economic collapse, or from passing on political power to GDI. As a result, while country boundaries are still retained, the world is remapped into three different geographical zones based on the levels of Tiberium contamination – Red Zones denote areas too toxic for human habitation, and consist of high concentrations of Tiberium; Yellow Zones denote considerable contamination, house most of the world's population, and is primarily controlled by Nod; Blue Zones denote low to minimal contamination, and house the last remnants of civilised life that is protected by GDI. Both GDI and Nod, as a result, slowly have evolved into the world's major superpowers, and retain constant distrust of the other.

The game's story takes place in 2047, when Kane, having been presumed dead after the Second Tiberium War, returns and leads Nod into attacking Blue Zones after bringing down GDI's orbital command station, the GDSS Philadelphia, forcing GDI to engage them in return, and triggering the Third Tiberium War. When the conflict reaches a dramatic event from a liquid Tiberium explosion, an extraterrestrial faction called the "Scrin" suddenly invades the planet, and comes into conflict with both factions. The events of the campaigns for GDI, Nod, and the Scrin, are closely interwoven together in the same timeline, as with the Firestorm expansion pack for Tiberian Sun. The GDI campaign ending differs from the Nod and Scrin campaign endings.

=== Campaigns ===
After driving the invading Brotherhood of Nod forces out of a number of the world's Blue Zones, GDI's General Granger (Michael Ironside), acting on intelligence gathered from Nod prisoners of war, begins to fear that the Brotherhood may be preparing to use WMDs and orders a pre-emptive strike on a Nod chemical weapons facility near Cairo, Egypt. Once there, GDI discovers that Nod was not only preparing to deploy their full nuclear arsenal on them, but that they were also in the process of manufacturing a liquid Tiberium bomb of unprecedented destructive power. The swiftness of GDI's response prevents a pending nuclear strike from Nod. In the GDI campaign, this prevents Nod's construction of a liquid Tiberium bomb; in the Nod campaign, Kane continues the construction of the liquid Tiberium device unabated within "Temple Prime" in Sarajevo.

Temple Prime subsequently comes under siege by GDI forces. General Granger plans to lay siege to the site until Kane and his Inner Circle would surrender, but Director Redmond Boyle (Billy Dee Williams) orders the use of the ion cannon upon Temple Prime to eliminate Kane's threat "once and for all". When the Ion Cannon is fired over Granger's strenuous objections, it detonates either the liquid Tiberium bomb inside the temple (Nod campaign) or nearby naturally occurring liquid Tiberium deposits (GDI campaign), creating a cataclysmic explosion that reaches out into space and kills millions of people in Eastern Europe's Yellow Zones. Kane and his Inner Circle are believed to be among the casualties.

Shortly after these disastrous events, GDI's deep space surveillance network suddenly begins to detect multiple large unidentified objects rapidly closing in on Earth. Director Boyle orders the Ion Cannon network to be turned against the vessels, several of which are destroyed but several more of which reach Earth. The alien forces, known only as the Scrin, begin construction of several "Threshold" towers where Tiberium is most concentrated, while launching massive assaults on all major cities across the globe. GDI realizes these attacks are meant to divert their attention away from the construction of massive tower structures in the world's Red Zones.

Nod's remaining commanders briefly agree to a cease-fire with the GDI in order to fight the Scrin. This cease-fire ends with the reappearance of Kane, who somehow escaped alive. He reveals to the Nod player commander that he never had any intention of winning the war with GDI, and instead started it in order to provoke the Ion Cannon attack on Temple Prime. It was the only thing that could detonate his liquid Tiberium bomb with sufficient power to lure the Scrin to Earth. It was the Scrin who seeded the Tiberium on Earth, and they took the Tiberium explosion as a sign the planet was ripe for harvesting. Kane hopes to seize one of the Threshold towers the Scrin are building, which are interstellar teleportation devices they use to ship Tiberium off-world, but which he believes are gateways to humanity's "ascension". This triggers a civil war within the Brotherhood, between those who are loyal to Kane, believe in his promise of ascension, and want to protect the Scrin; and those who recognize the threat that the Scrin pose to all of humanity, believe Kane must be overthrown if the Brotherhood is to survive, and wish to preserve the alliance with GDI. Ultimately, Kane's faction wins and the suspected leader of the anti-Scrin faction is executed.

The Scrin, for their part, realize they were tricked into coming too early. They also did not anticipate such heavy resistance from the humans. Curiously, they recognize Kane from their databanks, and seek to learn more about him. However, the organized attacks on the towers endangers the Scrin player commander's safety, forcing them to focus on protecting and completing at least one tower to allow their escape.

GDI succeeds in destroying all but one of the towers, Threshold 19 in southern Italy. From there, the story diverges depending on which campaign the player is playing. In the GDI and Nod campaigns, the Brotherhood actively protects Threshold 19 from attack by GDI forces; in the Scrin campaign, the Brotherhood is not present at Threshold 19, and the Scrin must protect the tower from GDI themselves. In all three campaigns, the Scrin are able to finish the tower's construction. With the tower completed, it becomes invulnerable to all forms of damage. In the Nod and Scrin campaigns, the remaining Scrin forces – decimated by the humans' counterattack – use the tower to escape to their home planet, while the Brotherhood of Nod gains access to it using stolen Scrin codes and uses it to "ascend", in Kane's words. The Scrin homeworld begins preparing a full invasion force. In the GDI campaign, a control node in the former Tiber riverbed is destroyed, resulting in the total annihilation of the remnants of the Scrin harvesting operation, rendering Threshold 19 completely inert, and preventing the Brotherhood's ascension. The GDI campaign can also result in one of two different victory movies depending on whether the player uses GDI's own liquid Tiberium bomb; if it is used, then it results in another Tiberium explosion similar to the one at Temple Prime, with 25 million casualties, the resignation of General Granger, and the promotion of the player character to Granger's former position; otherwise, it results in the resignation of Director Boyle to avoid being charged with attempting war crimes.

== Development ==
A sequel to Command & Conquer: Tiberian Sun had been expected since the game's release in 1999. Work on such a sequel was believed to have been started at Westwood Studios in 2001, but Electronic Arts decided to shift the focus of the would-be successor to Tiberian Sun from a science fiction theme to a modern theme based on contemporary conflicts, the result being the title of Command & Conquer: Generals and other SAGE engine based games. Developers still retained the Command & Conquer 3 idea (tentatively named 'Incursion'), intending it to be an update of the original C&C game in terms of gameplay and setting. Just prior to the release of Generals however, EA announced that Westwood Studios (Las Vegas) would be closing and would be consolidated into EA Los Angeles. This merger split the original Westwood team, with some of its members not being willing to relocate and quitting to form the company Petroglyph Games, with the remainder moving to Los Angeles to work at the newly consolidated studio. With this, the development of Command & Conquer 3 was effectively put on hold.

Early concept artwork of GDI Zone Troopers crossing a Tiberium field

In 2004, old concept art from Westwood Studios was made public under the name "Command & Conquer 3". The artwork showed a "mech" unit, a full 3D RTS gameplay environment similar to that used in the title Generals, and the original interface system from both the original Command & Conquer game and its sequel of Tiberian Sun. The unveiling of this artwork fueled speculation that Electronic Arts had begun work on a Command & Conquer game. In December 2004, after the EA Los Angeles team settled down, then executive producer and Command & Conquer lead Mark Skaggs announced in a mass e-mail that this next Command & Conquer game would be Command & Conquer: Red Alert 3, and not the awaited sequel to Tiberian Sun. Shortly thereafter, Mark Skaggs left EA for unspecified reasons and ideas for the Red Alert 3 title were mothballed. Mike Verdu later became the new lead on the Command & Conquer series. On April 18, 2006, Command & Conquer 3: Tiberium Wars was prematurely announced, then few days later the official press release was made, and EA Los Angeles would begin to host several fan summits for previews, feedback and discussions on the new title.

Tiberium Wars was released in three separate editions; the pre-order edition, the standard edition (box art featured at the article header) and the Kane Edition, which constitutes a special collector's edition with various extras and a bonus DVD featuring exclusive content. Tiberium Wars was given a suggested retail price of US$49.99, while the C&C 3: Kane Edition was available at "select retailers" with a suggested retail price of US$59.99 in the USA. It is also sold in the Command and Conquer: Saga bundle pack, along with Command & Conquer: The First Decade.

The game was additionally released for the Xbox 360 in May 2007, Support for the Xbox Live Vision Camera is included.

The official map editor for Command and Conquer 3: Tiberium Wars was released on April 20, 2007.

A modified version of the SAGE engine is used to run Command & Conquer 3's graphics. SAGE technology had been used in the RTS series Generals and The Battle For Middle-Earth games, and the engine's features subsequently are present in C&C 3.

=== Soundtrack ===
The soundtrack for Tiberium Wars was composed by Steve Jablonsky and Trevor Morris. Frank Klepacki – the composer of all the previous C&C installments with the exception of Command & Conquer: Generals – was contacted by Electronic Arts to compose the soundtrack for Tiberium Wars, but turned the offer down to focus on his career at Petroglyph Games. The titles of some songs show references to Command & Conquer: Renegade. Music is itself futuristic and is reflected in military and desert themes.

=== Casting ===
Joseph D. Kucan reprises his role as Kane, the leader of the Brotherhood of Nod. Tiberium Wars also features Tricia Helfer as Nod General Kilian Qatar, Josh Holloway as Nod Intelligence Officer Ajay, Michael Ironside as GDI General Jack Granger, Jennifer Morrison as GDI Intelligence Officer Kirce James, Grace Park as Lt. Sandra Telfair, and Billy Dee Williams as GDI Director Redmond Boyle. The cutscenes of Command & Conquer 3: Tiberium Wars were directed by EA in-house cinematic director Richard Taylor.

=== Expansion pack ===
In August 2007, the Electronic Arts team for Command & Conquer 3: Tiberium Wars launched an online television-style broadcast under the title of "BattleCast Primetime", which was meant to periodically provide C&C fans with information and news on future Tiberium Wars-related developments, expansion packs and patches. During "BattleCast Primetime"'s pilot episode, the expansion pack to Tiberium Wars, entitled Kane's Wrath, was officially announced.

== Reception ==
=== Reviews ===
Reception

Aggregate score
Aggregator	Score
Metacritic	PC: 85/100; X360: 82/100

Review scores
Publication	Score
1Up.com	A
Eurogamer	8/10
Game Informer	8.5/10
GamePro	4.5/5
GameSpot	9/10
GameSpy	4/5
IGN	8.5/10
Official Xbox Magazine (US)	8.0/10

Awards
Publication	Award
Gamestar	Best RTS Game of 2007
G-Phoria Awards (2007)	Best Strategy Game
1UP	Strategy/Simulation Game of 2007
Firing Squad (2008)	Number 10 on Top Ten PC Games of 2007
11th Annual Interactive Achievement Awards (2007)	Strategy/Simulation Game of the Year

PC Gamer U.S. gave the game its "Editor's Choice" rating at 90%, stating that "one of the greatest RTS franchises of all time returns to glory", while PC Gamer Sweden and UK gave it a more reserved rating of 81% and 82% respectively, stating that it was "a welcome, but limited, return". GameSpot gave the game a 9.0 out of 10 and the "Editor's Choice", referring to Tiberium Wars as "one of the finest real-time strategy games in years". IGN labelled the game as "great", rating it at 8.5/10. GamePro gave Command & Conquer 3: Tiberium Wars its "Editor's Choice" rating at 4.5 out of 5, designating it as "Game of the Month" in its June 2007 issue. UK magazine PC Format gave the game an 81% rating and praised the "greased eel-slick presentation and explosive, ripping action" which makes Command and Conquer the "distillation of what RTS is all about", but it also criticised the lack of innovation present. Finnish game magazines Pelit and MikroBitti gave it 89/100 and 4/5, respectively. MikroBitti applauded the game's appearance and sounds, but criticised it for lack of loyalty to the early Command & Conquer game mechanics. UK magazine Edge gave the game a rating of seven. Due to the intentionally faithful recreation of the original Command and Conquer experience, the magazine felt that the game's strategic formula was too dated in comparison to more strategic titles available in the real-time strategy market.

=== Sales ===
Command & Conquer 3 sold 128,000 units in the week after its release, and one million units were reported as sold by May 31, 2007. Its computer version received a "Gold" sales award from the Entertainment and Leisure Software Publishers Association (ELSPA), indicating sales of at least 200,000 copies in the United Kingdom.

=== Awards ===
During the 11th Annual Interactive Achievement Awards, the Academy of Interactive Arts and Sciences (AIAS) awarded Command & Conquer 3 with "Strategy/Simulation Game of the Year".
