= Mage Knight =

Tabletop game

The Mage Knight Logo.

Mage Knight is a miniatures wargame using collectible figures, created by WizKids, Inc, and is the earliest example of what is now known as a collectible miniatures game (or CMG). The game was designed by founder Jordan Weisman along with Kevin Barrett. The game is the first to use WizKids' Clix system, combining roleplaying and wargaming elements with aspects of collectible card games. Mage Knight achieved success after it was introduced in 2000.

In October 2010 Wizkids relaunched the Mage Knight brand with Mage Knight Board Game, a cooperative board game designed by Vlaada Chvátil. In February 2013, WizKids announced that it would release Mage Knight: Resurrection, which utilizes its SwitchClix bases to be compatible with both Mage Knight 2.0 and HeroClix rules. The release date was Fall 2013.

== Design ==
Unlike many other miniatures war-games, Mage Knight eliminates the need for reference to rule books and tables by integrating a dial into each figure that contains its current combat statistics - movement rate, attack and defense values, combat damage, and special abilities. While this system lacks the versatility of other miniatures games, mainly because players cannot customize their figures, it makes up for this by facilitating rapid gameplay and by having a large number of distinctive figures. The system, called the combat dial, has proved to be highly popular and is used in WizKids's other games, including HeroClix and MechWarrior. The dial allows a figure's displayed statistics to change as it takes damage.

All miniatures, called warriors, come pre-painted and are pre-assigned point costs based on their abilities. These costs range from 3 points (only the limited edition goblin volunteer Podo has achieved a point value this low) to over 500 points (for the tanks and the Apocalypse Dragon). To play a game, players will generally agree upon a point cost total, and then design their armies to maximize their strategic capabilities within the specified point cost total. Each player is allowed to take a number of actions per turn equal to the point cost total divided by 100. These actions include movement, combat, or the use of special abilities such as Regeneration and Necromancy. Game play is typically rapid, but often highly strategic, both in terms of traditional maneuvering and combat common to miniatures games and because of the unusual combinations of unit special abilities that make every army unique.

Each Mage Knight figure belongs to a specific faction. The factions in the initial release included the Atlantis Guild, the Elemental League, the Black Powder Rebels, the Draconum, The Knights Immortal, the Orc Raiders, and the Necropolis Sect. Other factions were added later. Each faction had its own strengths and weaknesses; for example the Atlantis Guild had many figures with powerful ranged attacks, but it lacked healers. A player could combine figures of different factions in their army at will, but only figures of the same faction could move in a formation together. Using formation rules, a player could move three to five adjacent figures while using only one action. A formation combat action could also be taken, in which multiple adjacent figures of the same faction attack and increase the chances of successfully hitting the target. Since the limited number of actions per turn is one of the most important strategic considerations in the game, a player making his army would have to balance the advantages of formation movement and formation combat against the desire to have the versatility of figures from different factions.

== Awards ==
=== Origins Awards ===
Year	Award
2005	Hall of Fame - Mage Knight
2004	Best Game Aid or Accessory - Mage Knight 3D Dungeon Tiles
2002	Best Game-Related Fiction, Short Form - Enemy Healer (from The Official Mage Knight Collectors' Guide 1& 2)
2002	Best Graphic Presentation of a Board Game Product - Mage Knight Dungeons
2001	Best Science Fiction or Fantasy Miniature - Mage Knight Great Fire Dragon
2001	Best Vehicular Miniature - Mage Knight Atlantis War Machine: The Fist of Tezla
2000	Best Science-Fiction or Fantasy Miniatures Rules - Mage Knight: Rebellion

=== Hobby Outlook Awards ===
Year	Award
2004	Best Game of 2004 - Mage Knight
2003	Best Game of 2003 – Mage Knight
2000	Games Award of Merit 2000 – Mage Knight: Rebellion

=== GEM Awards ===
Year	Award
2000	Best Game Product - Mage Knight: Rebellion

=== Inquest Gamer Fan Awards ===
Year	Award
2004	Best Miniatures Product - Mage Knight Lancers

== Distribution ==
Mage Knight figures were sold in Starter Packs (which historically contained eight or nine figures along with rules and dice) and Booster Packs (four or five figures). Figures were sold in base sets, as well as expansion sets, and distributed with seven rarity levels. Levels 1 through 5 were assigned to the standard "infantry" figures, each of which was available in 3 power levels: Weak, Standard and Tough. Low power and cost figure were of 1-2-3 rarity, middle range figures were 2-3-4, and stronger army figures were 3-4-5. Level 6 figures were Uniques, which carried the stipulation that only one of any individual Unique could appear in a player's army. In addition, WizKids gave away limited edition, Unique versions of the non-Unique figures in the sets as prizes for tournaments in comic and game shops. These figures are not generally available for retail sale, and have different statistics and point costs than the regular figures. This novel prize policy was in part responsible for Mage Knight's success. Some expansions had ultra-rare "chase" figures, listed as rarity level 7, which were produced in limited quantities and found randomly in boosters, such as the Apocalypse Horsemen in Sinister or the glow-in-the-dark variants from Minions. Finally, Wiz Kids also sold larger figures individually. The figures, which included dragons, chariots, war machines and giants, had multiple combat dials that applied to each side of the figure to make them harder to kill and allow them multiple attacks. Some of these larger, individual figures cost so many points that they could be utilized only in large armies.

In 2002, the Dungeons expansion was released in starters and boosters, which featured a new type of gameplay more akin to traditional RPG "dungeon-crawl" adventures. Instead of players each amassing armies to go head-to-head, Dungeons had players select a team of Hero characters, and enter a dungeon map filled with wandering monsters and treasure chests. During each player's turn, the opponent controlled any monsters encountered, and the goal was to defeat the monsters and escape with the most gold from the treasure chests. Adventures could be played individually or as a collective campaign, with the Hero figures having 5 "levels" that were attained with experience from adventuring. All figures (Heroes and Mage Spawn monsters) were still fully compatible with regular Mage Knight rules. The Dungeons format featured two expansions of its own, Pyramid and Dragon's Gate, and two fixed 5-figure sets with special characters, maps and scenarios titled Heroic Quests. In addition, WizKids released 3-dimensional plastic floor tiles, walls, doors, and objects which could purchased to build a full scale dungeon.

In November 2003, WizKids released a new "base" set (their third, after Rebellion and Unlimited), colloquially referred to as "Mage Knight 2.0," with many rules overhauled or expanded, which introduced new strategic possibilities to the game, including capabilities to customize Unique warriors and battles via styrene cards called Items, Domains, and Constructed Terrain. Later expansions introduced more options via Spellbooks, Spells, and Adventuring Companies. The two "versions" can be distinguished by their logos; the original Mage Knight sets feature a straight short sword through the logo while "2.0" and its subsequent expansions have a curved scimitar. This change also made all original series character redundant as they were no longer tournament legal, this meant that loyal followers abandon the game and sales and popularity plummeted.

Mage Knight saw a total of 14 expansions in booster packs, as well as prepackaged sets of figures in the Heroic Quests, Conquest, and Titans supplements, and special holiday-themed figures ("Santa Claus" and "Frosty the Snow-Minion") released in 2001 and 2003. The Conquest version had a number of large castle wall and fortification pieces, including 2 unique figures. Several Army Packs were released, with one random figure and 8 fixed figures from a specific faction. In addition, the Unlimited set released a special "Painter's Edition" which featured miniatures which were unpainted and removed from the bases for customizing purposes.

== Expansions ==
The expansions are (in order of release):

- Rebellion - The original Mage Knight release from November, 2000.
- Lancers - Released in May 2001, this first expansion introduced cavalry figures, with double the base size of regular figures and unique rules regarding their use. The expansion also introduced the first figures using the 'charge' and 'bound' special abilities which allowed figures to move and attack in the same action.
- Whirlwind - Released in October 2001, the 2nd Mage Knight expansion introduced the Shyft, a faction that allows the Mage Spawn (monster) faction to use formations and new figures with special abilities such as 'venom' and 'ram', which allows the infliction of automatic damage if one moved into contact with an opposing figure.
- Dungeons - Released in 2002, Mage Knight Dungeons is a complete, stand alone game as opposed to being a mere expansion to the Mage Knight system. Players take on the role of heroes fighting monsters in a dungeon and collecting treasure. Dungeons starter sets included a map, as well as two heroes, six mage spawn (monsters), and two chests, while boosters contained half as many of each. Dungeon kits with new maps and terrain were also available as part of the release. Though many of the Dungeons rules differ from Mage Knight rules, all Mage Knight Dungeons figures are fully compatible with regular Mage Knight.
- Unlimited - This 2002 expansion was actually the re-release of a base (introductory) set. Unlimited took 160 figures from Rebellion and Lancers, some of which featured new sculpts.
- Conquest - Released in June 2002, Mage Knight Conquest was not a true expansion but a rules set for large scale, high point-total Mage Knight battles to be played in a reasonable period of time. Conquest came with a 96-page rulebook, 3 unique figures, and several pieces of new siege equipment. Also, several connectable castle fortifications were released, including a castle keep and gatehouse which each came with a unique figure, a round tower, and 2 sets of walls.
- Sinister - This expansion, released in 2002, featured a new faction, the Solonavi, that featured powerful, high point cost figures with unique clear plastic sculpts. The expansion also featured 'dual faction' figures, figures that count as being members of two different factions. This set also featured the four ultra-rare Riders of the Apocalypse as chase figures, randomly inserted in boosters.
- Minions - Released in September 2002, Minions featured more Solonavi and Draconum figures, including the first non-unique Solonavi figures and the first dual faction Draconum unique figures. In addition, the Tough versions of the first 10 figures in the set were made in limited edition glow-in-the-dark plastic variants, randomly inserted in boosters.
- Heroic Quests - Also released in September 2002. Another supplement for Dungeons, Heroic Quests consisted of 2 fixed 5-figure scenario-based boxed sets, Magestone Mines and The Citadel, each of which included 4 unique Heroes, a powerful Master Adversary figure, a unique double-sided map, and special scenario rules and monster tokens.
- Pyramid - Released in January 2003, Pyramid was not a true expansion but a new starter set for the Mage Knight Dungeons game. Like Dungeons, all figures are compatible with regular Mage Knight play.
- Uprising - Released in April 2003, Uprising was a relatively small expansion, with 96 figures released.
- Dragon's Gate - This expansion was another addition to the Mage Knight Dungeons game, with all figures again being compatible with standard Mage Knight rules.
- Mage Knight - Commonly known as "Mage Knight 2.0", this Base Set was released in November 2003 and represented a major revision to the Mage Knight ruleset. Figures from prior sets remained compatible with this ruleset. Figures from the prior sets were phased out from tournament play. Figures released with Mage Knight 2.0 and later also included more features that enabled them to be more versatile and customizable on the battlefield, such as a wider variety of special abilities, subfactions giving units a more "permanent" ability, and proficiencies which gave warriors abilities based on their combat value types. One of the major enhancements with Mage Knight 2.0 was the introduction of styrene cards which influenced gameplay in various ways.
- Dark Riders - Released in April 2004, Dark Riders introduces the "mount" and "rider" units. Certain warriors are removable from their bases, and can be placed in slots on the front of larger "mount" units to create a "cavalry" unit, and gain significant benefits from doing so. Certain relics are only equipable by riders. Dark Riders also introduces Faith and Catastrophe Domain cards, new Item cards, the Dark Riders and Wylden Host subfactions, and four ultra-rare "chase" figures: the Avatars of Apocalypse (whose subfaction the set is named after).
- Sorcery - Released in September 2004, Sorcery introduced a new rules mechanic for spellcasting and a new proficiency for blocking spells cast by opposing players. Associated with this new ruleset were two new types of styrene cards - Spellbooks and Spells. Sorcery also was the first 2.0 expansion to have non-unique warriors with Item slots, allowing for even greater versatility in army building. Although no new factions were introduced with Sorcery, 10 new subfactions were introduced to give even more variety to the types of armies players could build.
- Omens - Released in April 2005, Omens introduced two new rules mechanics: Adventuring Companies, which allowed an army to have a universal ability, and could be made cheaper by choosing specific characters; and Champions, figures with a removable base that allowed the player to choose from a set of 5 increasingly powerful combat dials, depending on the number of points the player wished to spend on it. Also reintroduced with the Omens expansion was the Shyft faction, as well as the first 2.0 non-unique Mage Spawn figures. Associated with the release, though not part of the release itself, was the introduction of a convention-exclusive figure known as the Apocalypse Dragon.
- Nexus - Released on August 24, 2005, and featured previously released figures from the Unlimited, Sinister, Minions, Uprising, Pyramid, and Dragon's Gate sets. These figures use the same sculpts as the original figures, but are painted to 2.0 standards, and have combat dials and stats updated to reflect gameplay in the Mage Knight 2.0 ruleset. The set is unique in that unlike other sets, where "common" units had three levels of relative power (Weak, Standard, and Tough), Nexus had only Unique and Standard figures; no Weak or Tough versions were included in the set. Presumably this was to give a greater variety of figure sculpts, while keeping the amount of distinct figures on par with other Mage Knight expansion sets. On June 30, 2005, Wizkids announced the Nexus expansion would be the last in the current series and that after November 2005 all tournament support would cease. Neither Wizkids or Topps gave any official reason. However, WizKids was acquired in 2009 by NECA, and in February 2013 announced a new expansion appropriately titled Resurrection.
- Resurrection - Was released in Fall 2013 and utilizes WizKids' SwitchClix dials. SwitchClix allows the player to remove the figure from one base and attach it to another, so the same figure can be used on two different types of dials. Each of the 25 miniatures in the line will include two dials: one for Mage Knight 2.0 rules, and one that's compatible with the main HeroClix line. The figures will be available through starter sets and booster packs. There is no word as to whether the company will support possible Mage Knight tournaments as it had in the past.

== Other products ==
=== Video games ===
Mage Knight: Apocalypse

A full PC game title, Mage Knight: Apocalypse was published in September 2006 by Namco Bandai Games America and developed by Interserv International. A handful of new figurines, now amongst the rarest, were released as tie-ins to help promote the PC game.

Mage Knight: Destiny's Soldier

A title for the Nintendo DS, Mage Knight: Destiny's Soldier was released in the same month as Mage Knight: Apocalypse.

=== Novels ===
There are five novels listed by Del Rey/Ballantine books. However, there is only evidence of the publication of the first two books. Books 3 to 5 have never been made available to the public in either physical or eBook format.

- Mage Knight 1: Rebel Thunder by Bill McCay
- Mage Knight 2: Dark Debt by Doranna Durgin
- Mage Knight 3: Stolen Prophecy by Christopher Stasheff
- Mage Knight 4: The Black Thorn Gambit by Josepha Sherman
- Mage Knight 5: Khamsin's Heir by Doranna Durgin

=== Comic book series ===
Published by IDW beginning in 2002, the Mage Knight comic book series was written by Todd Dezago based on a story by Jordan Weisman. The covers were illustrated by J. Scott Campbell and Alex Garner (Danger Girl) and the interiors were illustrated by Dave Cabrera. Issue #1, released in October 2002, came with a certificate that could be redeemed for an exclusive figure of Maren'Kar, one of the characters in the comic book.

=== Board game ===
The Mage Knight Board Game was designed by Vlaada Chvátil and released in December 2011. There were also three distinct expansions and one collection released for Mage Knight Board Game.

== Factions ==
The land of Mage Knight is split among several factions. Several of these factions split from Tezla's original empire, and others have organized and grown since Tezla's death. Based on the outcomes of various official storyline tournaments held at comics and gaming shops and major gaming conventions, when 2.0 was released most of the major factions were renamed, and also further divided into one or more subfactions, each of which possesses its own unique ability.

- Atlantis Guild/Atlantean Empire - This is the core remains of Tezla's original empire. Upon his death, the Atlantis Guild leaders focused mostly on Technomantic magic, and their armies often consist of mixes between mages, troops, and magically-infused golems. Nujarek later further organized the Guild into the Atlantean Empire in an effort to regain the former glory of Atlantis. Their 2.0 subfactions are the Imperial Legion, Golemkore and Delphana.
- Apocalypse - First introduced in the Sinister set as the four ultra-rare Riders of the Apocalypse, this cult, also known as the Tur'aj, was dormant for many years. As chaos grew in the land, the Apocalypse gained power. At first, the heralds of the Apocalypse rode forth in the Land, and later several Avatars were created to build up the cult again. They sought to sow discord and death in the land, and brought about the rebirth of the terrible Apocalypse Dragon. They have one 2.0 subfaction, the Minions of the Apocalypse.
- Black Powder Rebels/Black Powder Revolutionaries - This faction began as a rag-tag group of dissidents to the Atlantis Guild who saw the injustice that the Guild inflicted upon many of the denizens of the land. This was especially due to the treatment of the Dwarves, who, due to their strong resistance to Magestone (a major source of magical power, used heavily in Technomancy), were conscripted into working in the various Magestone mines, often until they were worked to death. The Rebels became a major player after the assassination of Karrudan, and later grew in strength to become the Black Powder Revolutionaries. Their 2.0 subfactions are the Bloody Thorns, Northlanders and Forgemasters.
- Draconum - Not particularly allied with any faction, though opposed to the Apocalypse and tried to prevent the Apocalypse from claiming the egg of the Apocalypse Dragon. Mostly, however, they act as pseudo-mercenaries, who have a common quest to better themselves, as they continue to evolve into higher and more potent forms of Draconum. They have one 2.0 subfaction, the Dragon Mystics.
- Elemental League/Elemental Freeholds - A splinter faction from Tezla's original empire, the Elemental League focuses mostly on Elemental magic, or magic of life. Opposed primarily to the Necropolis Sect/Dark Crusaders, they lost much ground and many troops to the latter faction. Eventually, they came to be more scattered, and fought to keep from being wiped out completely. As 2.0's story begins, they retreated to an Elven castle in the forest and became the Elemental Freeholds. Distantly related to the Elven Lords, they are neither strong allies nor bitter enemies with them. Their 2.0 subfactions are the Wylden Host and Storm Druids.
- Heroes - Introduced primarily for Dungeons-style games, this faction represents individuals who seek glory in the Land. Many of the Hero faction are dual-aligned with another faction, though some are not. They are not in any 2.0 sets and have no subfactions.
- Knights Immortal/Elven Lords - An ancient race of elves that live in the Rivvenheim Mountains in the easternmost regions of the known Land. Their overarching goal is to eliminate chaos from the land, and often do so without mercy to those they consider unworthy. Allied with the Atlantis Guild for a time against the Orcs, they were eventually betrayed and left to fend for themselves, and have since sworn vengeance as the Elven Lords. Their 2.0 subfactions are the Free Armies, Temple Masters and Order of Sorcery.
- Mage Spawn - Not truly an organized "faction", but in the game are figures without any faction. In the early sets, these represented various creatures, often twisted through magic (hence their name) that were of various levels of intelligence, but not organized into any formal faction. In later 2.0 sets, some mercenary-type figures were also included, and their subfaction, Order of the Ninth Circle, had a gameplay ability that let them bond more fully to any faction by assuming the faction of any and all figures in the army they are with.
- Necropolis Sect/Dark Crusaders. A split-off faction from Tezla's empire, the Necropolis sect focused on Necromantic magic, or magic of death. Primarily opposed to the Elementals, they took much of their territory and did much damage. Later, they began the Dark Crusade to continue taking over the Land and convert all to the worship of the Dark Tezla. Their 2.0 subfactions are the Deathspeakers, the Order of Vladd and the Blood Cultists.
- Orc Raiders/Orc Khans - The Orc Raiders were a semi-organized group of nomadic raiders from the north, in a land called The Fist. They attacked and plundered, but eventually became hungrier for more spoils, and became more organized. The lowly goblin Podo stole a powerful Elven shield relic, and rose to a tenuous position of power among his larger cousins. As the various Orc Khans united, they became an even greater force in the land to reckon with. Their 2.0 subfactions are the Broken Tusk, the Shadow Khans and the Chaos Shamans.
- Shyft - Introduced in the Whirlwind expansion, these strange reptilian creatures seemed to have a strange psychic bond with the various Mage Spawn found in the Land. Originally relatively weak, they relied on this bond with more powerful Mage Spawn to help fight. Eventually, they withdrew from the Land, and were largely unknown. In the Omens set, they reemerged in a new, more powerful warrior form. While they maintained their affinity with the Mage Spawn, they became powerful warriors in their own right. They seem to have somewhat of an alliance with the Apocalypse faction, though the full connection between the two is unknown. They have a single 2.0 subfaction, the Darkmarch, and have the faction ability to grant Mage Spawn the Shyft faction for formation purposes.
- Solonavi - Originally introduced in the Sinister expansion as extremely powerful figures, they remain a fairly enigmatic race of energy creatures. They offer favors to various groups and individuals, in exchange for favors in return to be named later. At the beginning of the Mage Knight 2.0 timeline, they revealed themselves more fully as being aligned with the Oracles of Rokos, and offered their services to the Atlantis Guild to become the most powerful empire in the land. When the offer was refused, they were outraged, and began claiming their own territory in the land. Consisting of beings of light and various "oathsworn" servants, they seem to be strongly dedicated to protecting the Land against the rise of the Apocalypse. However, it is strongly hinted they might have ulterior motives, and many still do not trust them. They cast a spell which reawakened many dormant magics in the Land. Their single 2.0 subfaction is the Oracle of Rokos.

== Reviews ==
- Envoyer (German) (Issue 50 - Dec 2000)
