= HorrorClix =

Collectible miniatures game

HorrorClix is a collectible miniatures game. Released on August 30, 2006, it uses WizKids' Clix system. The game's tagline is "wicked fun." The product was discontinued in November 2008 when WizKids' new owner Topps shut down the company. In September 2009, collectible toy producer NECA announced it had purchased WizKids' intellectual property from Topps, including HorrorClix .

== Gameplay ==
Similar to HeroClix, HorrorClix offers players the ability to construct teams of monsters that cross horror genres, allowing them to create a "dream team" of favorite characters. Vampires, werewolves, zombies, and demons are available in the game's first release, as well as a number of vigilantes who fight for the side of good including a vampire hunter, ghost finders, priests and military men.

HorrorClix introduces several new game mechanics. Plot twist cards, scenario play, fiction, and individual character cards for each monster place the game's emphasis firmly on the fantasy of writing or directing a horror story rather than a game of fighting and combat. Innocent victims play an important part of the game, with monsters protecting them, eating them, or both.

HorrorClix demonstrations and special events were announced at the Origins game convention in Columbus, Ohio, and for the Gen Con game convention in Indianapolis, Indiana. Additionally, WizKids announced at the GAMA trade show in Las Vegas, Nevada, that Cthulhu was the premiere figure for the launch of the game.

== HorrorClix releases ==
- HorrorClix: Released August 30, 2006, this initial release is often referred to as the Base Set and featured 96 figures. The "Buy it by the Brick" exclusives included a Jack the Ripper Limited Edition figure, a coupon for the AVP: Aliens collector's set and a coupon for the Great Cthulhu colossal figure. In addition, Wizard gaming magazine had a special mail-in offer for a Morgana figure .
- The Lab: The Lab was released January 31, 2007 for the U.S. and the rest of the world, mid-August 2007 for Europe, and had 96 figures. The first expansion set has a sci-fi/horror theme and includes alien Greys, dinosaurs, misshapen experiments and zombies. The By-the-Brick exclusives were an LE Cloaking Predator and a coupon for the second collector's set, AVP: Predators. In Europe an additional BiBtB figure was made Available LE Zombie Astronaut.
- Freakshow: Another 96-figure set released in May 2007, Freakshow has a strong carnival theme with clowns, wild animals and a variety of sideshow freaks. The By-the-Brick exclusive was an LE Carousel Ghost. This set also featured the promotional Pierced Zombie, the first "New Guy Night" figure, obtained by being a new player at a venue. A first HorrorClix "Chase Figure" called Wacko Jacko Lantern was found in limited booster packs. This set featured unique names for the Veteran versions of figures and was also the last to support the original REV (rookie/experienced/veteran) setup.
- Nightmares: Released March 12, 2008, Nightmares is heavily influenced by classical literary sources and the reported fears of survey participants. Originally the set was to be released on Halloween 2007 but due to production issues it was delayed several months. It includes Grendel, the Ancient Mariner, Nessie, and Santa Claus, among others. With only 60 figures, it is the first expansion to use Wizkids' revised set structure and rarity layout, featuring a single miniature for each figure rather than the rookie/experienced/veteran versions of previous sets, and organized into common, uncommon, and rare tiers, with super-rare figures replacing the uniques. The "New Guy Night" exclusive was a Poltergeist.

=== Clix Bricks ===
To help "brick-and-mortar" stores compete against internet retail stores HorrorClix, like HeroClix, used the popular "buy it by the brick" configuration. A ClixBrick consisted of 12 shrink-wrapped boosters that included a special coupon for consumers who purchased HorrorClix at their local retailer. Consumers who sent in 12 UPC codes, the coupon, and the receipt from that one-time retail purchase received a special free figure, only obtainable through the ClixBrick offer, as well as another coupon that allowed the customer to purchase the Collector's Set associated with each release at a 25% discount. The first set also included a second coupon allowing the customer to purchase The Great Cthulhu colossal figure for $85.

=== Starter sets ===
- HorrorClix - The base set starter included six exclusive figures (Blood Vamp, Bane Wolf, Chainsaw, Outpatient, Lynch Ghost, and Skeleton), a two-sided map of a cemetery and a haunted house, 3D terrain including tombstones and a tree of the damned, two red dice, a rulebook, exclusive plot twist cards, and 12 victim tokens.
- The Freddy vs. Jason Action Pack [see below] contained "simplified" rules and new maps, and so can be seen as a revised starter of sorts.

=== Collector's sets and action packs ===
For 2006 and early 2007, licensed properties for HorrorClix were released in the form of Collector's Sets, which were direct-marketed online. After winning an online poll, AVP: Alien vs. Predator became the first movie for which WizKids acquired the rights. Licensed properties were later made available through regular commercial channels, and renamed Action Packs. Similar to the HorrorClix starter set, these packs featured a number of pre-selected figures, Plot Twist cards, and maps, from across the horror entertainment spectrum.

- Aliens: Released as the Collectors' Set for the HorrorClix base set, this contains 7 figures, Plot Twist cards, victims, and a map.
- Predators: Released with The Lab expansion set, this set contains 6 Predators and a human Apprentice Predator, as well as Plot Twist cards, victims, and a map.
- AVP: Alien Queen - Released on February 21, 2007, this action pack features a two-stage Queen, usable with attached egg sack or without, as well as an exclusive Alien figure, an exclusive Predator figure, a map, Minion tokens, and Plot Twist cards.
- B.P.R.D. - Released on April 4, 2007, this Action Pack features seven figures representing characters from the Dark Horse comic book series Hellboy and the B.P.R.D. (Bureau for Paranormal Research and Defense): Hellboy, Liz Sherman, Abe Sapien, Hellbaby, Johann Kraus, Ben Daimio, and Roger the Homunculus. This was the first officially "dual-branded" set released under the HorrorClix label, being designed for use in both HeroClix and HorrorClix. The dials feature HeroClix symbols and powers, as well as monster cards that make the figures usable in HorrorClix games. The action pack was released with numerous errors including missing numbers and Johann Kraus mistakenly having a flight stand; although WizKids eventually put forth a program for exchanging the defective Johann for a corrected version and included a new ticking clock card for HorrorClix and a new battlefield condition card for HeroClix.
- Freddy vs. Jason - Released March 12, 2008, to coincide with the release of the Nightmares expansion set, this features Freddy Krueger, a Freddy worm creature, Jason Voorhees, a Freddy vs. Jason double figure, and a Jason vs. Freddy double figure. It also includes one new double-sided map, four new Plot Twists, and two Special Objects (a boiler and an open grave).

== Colossal figures ==
- The Great Cthulhu - This 16" figure of Cthulhu comes packaged with a map, a set of instructions, and twenty-four Cultist Victim tokens. Cthulhu has three dials to represent himself and one dial to represent his attendant cultists. Cthulhu is playable in a 600, 1200, or 1800 point scenario where the players attempt to stop the ritual that will awaken him. This is similar to WizKids' earlier use of Galactus in HeroClix.

== Convention exclusives ==
- At Wizkids Attended Conventions for the 2007 convention season, a special dual-sided map featuring a Ruined Castle and the Stephens Bros. Carnival was available free with any purchase and a limited edition Vlad the Impaler figure was available free with a $75.00 purchase.

== Limited Editions ==
- Every series except Nightmares had four limited edition figures. These were the same as four of the uniques of the series, only their names and values were changed. The only figure with some difference from the original is Billy Stank, with a union instead of a confederation flag and a different color of uniform to reflect his side in the American Civil War, and he is the only one who has the same point value as the unique.

== Marvel Zombie figures ==
- Four ultra-rare chase figures were found in 1 out of every 100 Marvel Comics: Supernova HeroClix boosters - the Marvel Zombies versions of Captain America, Wolverine, Spider-Man, and Hulk. These are technically the first dual-branded figures as they appear in a HeroClix set yet come packed with HorrorClix monster cards, making them fully compatible. Mutations & Monsters, the November 2007 HeroClix release, featured new Marvel Zombies, but they are not officially compatible with HorrorClix.

== Reviews ==
- Pyramid
- Rue Morgue #62
