= Mage Knight: Apocalypse =

2006 action role-playing game

- Developer(s): InterServ International
- Publisher(s): NA: Namco Bandai Games; PAL: Deep Silver
- Platform(s): Windows
- Release: NA: September 26, 2006; UK: October 6, 2006; AU: November 2, 2006
- Genre(s): Action role-playing
- Mode(s): Single-player, multiplayer

Mage Knight: Apocalypse is an action role-playing game developed by InterServ International and released for Windows alongside companion title Mage Knight: Destiny's Soldier for the Nintendo DS in September 2006. The video game is set in the same universe as the related collectable miniatures game, Mage Knight.

== Plot ==
The campaign takes the characters through a world known as The Land, where various fantasy races are at war. The Solonavi, a group of spirit masters fear the world will come to an end if the war is not stopped. Throughout the game a group of heroes is formed, known as the Oathsworn. The Oathsworn set out to destroy the source of the evil force to save the world from destruction by recovering five "Aspects of Apocalypse" scattered throughout The Land.

=== Characters ===
- Janos the Dwarf (melee, gunner, explosives)
- Tal the Elf (fighter, healer, ranged attacker)
- Kithana the Nightblade (assassin, necromancer, vampire)
- Sarus the Draconum (earth, fire, wind magic)
- Chela the Amazon (bear/melee, eagle/ranged, jaguar/agile)

== Gameplay ==
Players assume the role of one of five playable characters, each with three separate skill paths. Skills are developed depending on playstyle, rather than manual selection of a skills. Individual skills and attributes gain experience and increase in level as they are used. As the game progresses, the player is partied with the other members of the Oathsworn and are able to control the other characters with basic commands (attack, follow, stop). If another character in the party dies, they will respawn at save points throughout the game.

The game consists of six chapters, each containing a linear dungeon. Throughout the dungeons there are mobs of monsters that drop various items (such as armor, magic stones, and consumables) along with employing puzzle elements. A crafting system allows players to create and enhance weapons from magic stones dropped by mobs and make potions using various herbs found throughout the game.

== Reception ==
Reception

Aggregate score
Aggregator	Score
Metacritic	47/100

Review scores
Publication	Score
Eurogamer	4/10
GameSpot	4.4/10
GamesRadar+	2/5
IGN	5.4/10

Mage Knight: Apocalypse received "generally unfavorable" reviews, according to review aggregator Metacritic. GameSpot called the game design "interesting" but "aggravatingly sloppy and painfully bland", while Eurogamer criticized the buggy multiplayer experience. IGN praised the game for its "good statistical progression system" and skill and item selection, but noted that the game "suffers from all around poor AI, several bugs" and has a "derivative storyline and awful voice acting". Many reviewers likened the game to Diablo in playstyle.
