= Clix (miniatures) =

Miniatures wargaming system

- Publishers: WizKids
- Players: 2 or more
- Setup time: < 2 minutes (Excluding team building)
- Playing time: 30+ minutes, Game times vary depending on number of players and the number of build points being used.
- Chance: Some (Dice rolling)
- Age range: 14 and up
- Skills: Arithmetic; Reading; Logic; Strategy; Common sense Metagaming; Opportunity cost Wargaming; Tactics; Probability; Dice Rolling

Clix is a miniatures wargaming system developed by WizKids. It is characterized by the use of a dial wheel in the base of miniature figurines. The dial can be turned to reveal hidden information, representing the changing statistics of the figurine as the game progresses.

Clix games include:

- Creepy Freaks
- Crimson Skies
- Halo ActionClix
- HeroClix
  - DC HeroClix
  - Marvel HeroClix
  - Indy HeroClix
    - Alien vs. Predator Heroclix
    - The BPRD and Hellboy HeroClix
    - City of Heroes HeroClix
    - City of Villains HeroClix
    - Invincible HeroClix
  - Gears of War HeroClix
  - Iron Maiden HeroClix
  - The Lord of the Rings HeroClix
  - Street Fighter HeroClix
  - Star Trek HeroClix
  - Yu-Gi-Oh! HeroClix
- HorrorClix
- Mage Knight
- MechWarrior
  - MechWarrior: Dark Age
  - MechWarrior: Age of Destruction
- Shadowrun Duels
- SportsClix
- Star Trek: Attack Wing
- MLB SportsClix
- ToonClix
