= Marvel HeroClix: Infinity Challenge =

Board game

Marvel HeroClix: Infinity Challenge is a 2002 board game published by WizKids.

== Gameplay ==
Marvel Heroclix is a miniatures game featuring team battles between superheroes.

Infinity Challenge is the first Marvel Heroclix set produced by WizKids released May 2002 and retired June 2004. It is also the first Heroclix set produced.

== Set ==
The set consists of the following characters made into figures:

- Annihilus
- Ant-Man
- Black Panther
- Blade
- Blizzard
- Boomerang
- Bullseye
- Captain America
- Constrictor
- Controller
- Cyclops
- Daredevil
- Doctor Strange
- Elektra
- Firelord
- Henchman
- Hercules
- Hobgoblin
- Hulk

- Hydra Medic
- Hydra Operative
- Jean Grey
- Gabe Jones
- Juggernaut
- Kang the Conqueror
- Kingpin
- Klaw
- Magneto
- Mister Hyde
- Nightmare
- Professor X
- Puppet Master
- Pyro
- Quasar
- Quicksilver
- Rogue
- S.H.I.E.L.D. Agent
- S.H.I.E.L.D. Medic

- Tia Senyaka
- Sabretooth
- Scarlet Witch
- Sentinel
- Skrull Agent
- Skrull Agent: Nenora
- Skrull Warrior
- Skrull Warrior: Raksor
- Spider-Man
- Thanos
- Thug
- Ultron
- Vision
- Vulture
- Wasp
- Whirlwind
- Wolfsbane
- Wolverine
- Yellowjacket (Rita DeMara)

== Reception ==
The reviewer from the online second volume of Pyramid called the game "quite a deal" for the price.

Marvel HeroClix: Infinity Challenge won the 2002 Origins Award for Best Science Fiction Or Fantasy Board Game.

== Reviews ==
- Syfy
