= Mage Knight: Destiny's Soldier =

2006 video game

- Developer(s): Big Blue Bubble
- Publisher(s): Namco Bandai Games
- Platform(s): Nintendo DS
- Release: NA: September 26, 2006
- Genre(s): Turn-based strategy
- Mode(s): Single-player

Mage Knight: Destiny's Soldier is a turn-based strategy video game for the Nintendo DS system based on the Wizkids Mage Knight tabletop game. It was produced by Namco and developed by Big Blue Bubble.

"It is your Destiny to build an army, command it to victory, and unite the war-torn Land."

== Summary ==
The year is 435 Tz, and every faction in the land is at war. If it continues there won't be much land left to fight over. The strain on the world's magical energy is literally tearing the land apart. The land's fate lies in your hands. You must earn the respect of all the races of the land, and together you must fight to keep the land alive. Travel the land earning respect and engage in battles along your journey leading up to an all out war.

You are one of five heroes whose destiny is to unite the Mage Knight Factions, in a war that will decide the fate of the world. You must gather forces and march upon the castle of Rokos, home of the Solonavi, to stop their evil spells from destroying the planet. Along the way you will encounter many challenges, and face many foes. Meet a cast of varying sorts like Wrath, the young mage, Jarok'Din, the battle-hardened troll, and Vargana, the high and mighty sorceress. Fight in many locales, forests, mountains, swamps, and more in over 70 maps. Are you ready to face your destiny?
