= Mage Knight Board Game =

2011 cooperative role-playing board game

- Designers: Vlaada Chvátil
- Illustrators: J. Lonnee, Chris Raimo, Milan Vavroň
- Publishers: WizKids
- Players: 1–4
- Playing time: 60–240 minutes (per scenario)
- Age range: 14+
- Skills: Strategy, Tactics, Logic

Mage Knight Board Game is a board game for 1 to 4 players designed by Vlaada Chvátil and released in November 2011. The game can be played solitaire, competitively, or cooperatively. It is based on the related collectable miniatures game, Mage Knight. It has been rated as one of the top single-player board games. The BoardGameGeek 2024 People's Choice Top 200 Solo Games poll ranked Mage Knight Board Game as the number 2 solo game, its third year in a row at that position.

== Gameplay ==
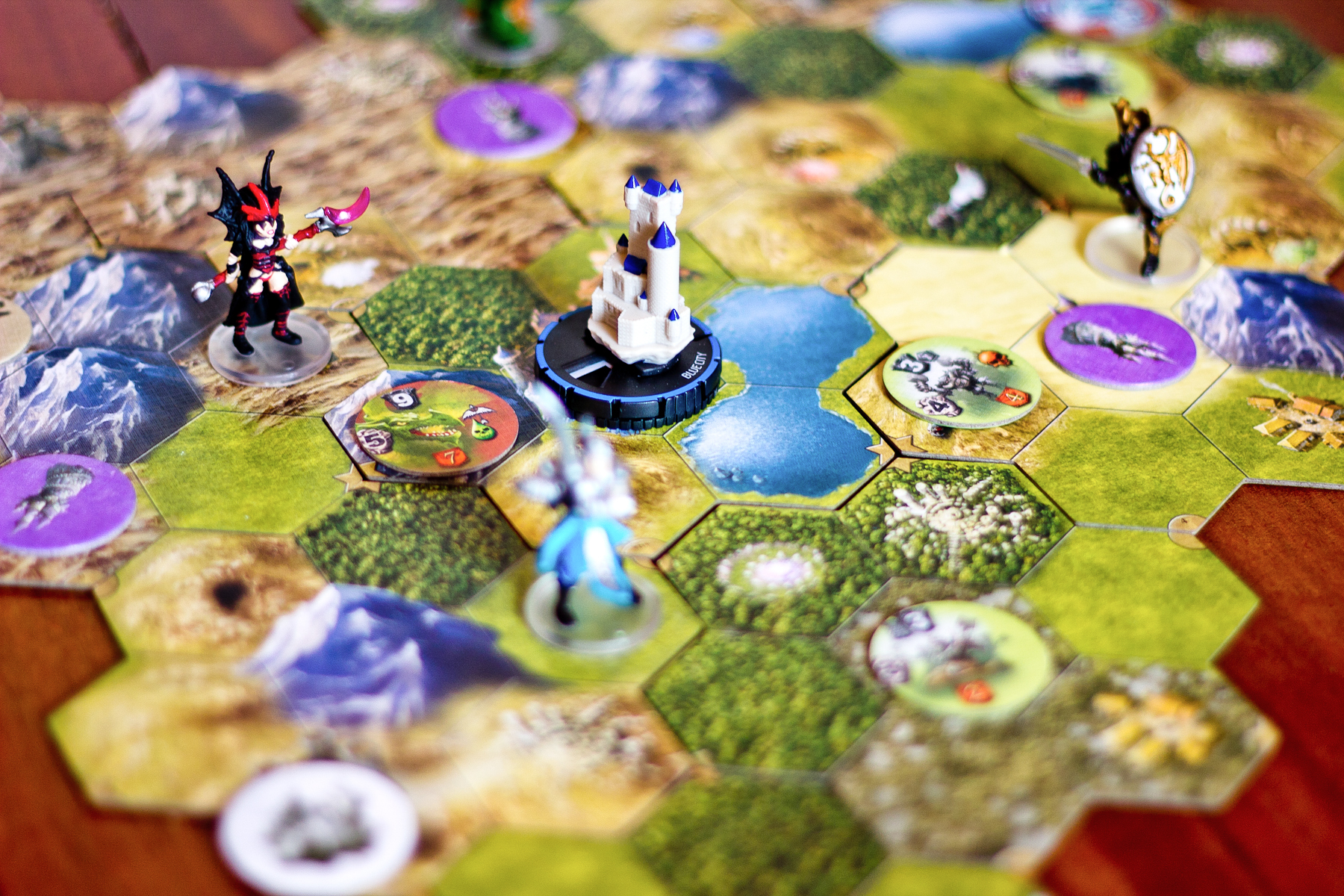
An example of Mage Knight Board game being played

In the Mage Knight Board Game a player controls one of four Mage Knights, exploring the Mage Knight universe and fighting against powerful enemies. Players choose between a number of scenarios to play, with each scenario having a particular objective to meet, such as conquering cities, controlling land areas, investigating mysteries, etc. Players create the game board using tiles as described within the scenario documentation.

Each character has a 16-card deck used for actions and movement. Players begin the game with a hand size of 5 cards. Hand size increases as characters level up by defeating monsters. The map is slowly revealed as players explore to reveal new tiles. Enemies are placed on the map as the board is revealed. The game time is tracked using rounds utilizing a Day/Night mechanic. When a player’s deck is empty at the start of their turn, the round will end and advance to the next Day/Night cycle. The game continues until a predetermined number of game days have elapsed, at which point the game ends. If the objective has been met, as described within the scenario, the players win. If the objective has not been met, the players lose.

=== Characters ===
- Arythea: The Blood Cultist
- Goldyx: The Winged Green Lizard
- Norowas: An Elven Leader
- Tovak Wyrmstalker: A Knight
- Braevalar: A Druid (Shades of Tezla Expansion)
- Wolfhawk A Solitary Warrior (Lost Legion Expansion)
- Krang: A Orc Chaos Shaman (Krang Character Expansion)
- Coral (The Apocalypse Dragon Expansion)

== Expansions and Re-releases ==
Three distinct expansions released for Mage Knight:

1. Mage Knight Board Game: The Lost Legion was released in December 2012.
2. Mage Knight Board Game: Krang Character was released in 2013
3. Mage Knight Board Game: Shades of Tezla was released in July 2015
4. Mage Knight Board Game: The Apocalypse Dragon was released in March 2026

Mage Knight Board Game: Ultimate Edition was released in December 2018 by WizKids. The Ultimate Edition included the base game along with all of three previously released expansions. Mage Knight: Dual Color Card Expansion was released in 2019 and included cards that were previously only contained within the Ultimate Edition.

In July 2016, the Star Trek: Frontiers board game was released utilizing gameplay and systems from Mage Knight Board Game.

== Critical reception ==
The overall reception of the board game was positive. Entropymag says that the game "stand(s) apart from even the best sandboxes found in electronic games." TechRaptor rated it a 10.0 and described it as "one of the best, if not the best, solo game on the market." Board Games Land similarly mentioned that it "holds the crown as the best solo board game" and The Thoughtful Gamer said "you know it’s going to be difficult, but in the end it’s going to be a rewarding experience."

Within the first month of the game's release it was sold out due to an overwhelming response, prompting a second release.

=== Awards and honors ===
- 2011 Nominee for Dice Tower's Best Game of the Year Award for
- 2012 International Gamers Awards: Nominee in the General Strategy category
- 2012 Golden Geek Award for Most Thematic Board Game from Board Game Geek.
- 2013 Origins Awards Best Board Game Nominee
- 2012 Spiel der Spiele Hit für Experten Recommended
- 2012 Golden Geek Most Innovative Board Game Nominee

In 2019, Mage Knight Board Game was inducted into the Origins Award Hall of Fame.
