= Shadowrun Duels =

Collectible miniatures game published by WizKids in 2003

Shadowrun Duels is a collectible miniatures game published by WizKids in 2003 that was based on the Shadowrun role-playing game originally produced by FASA Corporation.

== Description ==
In 2002, WizKids won three awards at the Origins Awards for their HeroClix system, a series of 28 mm miniatures mounted on a rotating dial that could track the changing statistics of the figure. They proved popular, and the following year, WizKids released Shadowrun Duels, a collectible miniatures game using a similar rotating dial system, but with much larger 6" (1:12 scale) figurines that were molded by Plan B Toys. The base has three Clix dials that track damage to the head, weapon, or body.

Duels between miniatures take place on a flat surface that is at least 5 ft x 5 ft (1.5 m x 1.5m), and the figurines must start at least 4 ft (1.2 m) apart. When damage is done to a figurine, the owning player marks the damage on any one of the three dials. When all three totals reach zero, the miniature is eliminated from the duel.

WizKids originally announced that there would be three releases of six figurines each, but the third series was never produced due to the low sales of the first two series. However, a series of cards that can give figures a bonus was given out as convention and tournament bonuses.

As of 2010, the rights to the game are in the hands of Topps, which bought WizKids in 2003, and then sold WizKids — but not the Shadowrun property — in 2009.

== Figures ==
SKU	Name	Point Value	Notes
Release 1 – June 2003
WZK6400	The Street Deacon	2	Male human vigilante
WZK6401	Kyushi	2	Female Yakuza assassin
WZK6402	Liada	3	Female elf mage
WZK6403	G-Dogg	3	Male ork bouncer
WZK6404	Lothan the Wise	4	Male troll mage
WZK6405	Silver Max	3	Male dwarf rigger
ToyFare promo – October 2003
WZK6406	Kellan Colt	2	Female human mage
Release 2 – December 2003
WZK6407	Karkhov	2	Male street samurai
WZK6408	Midnight	2	Female elf cat-burglar
WZK6409	Natokah	4	Male human shaman
WZK6410	Kross	3	Male ork bodyguard
WZK6411	Wolf Nev	3	Male troll ganger
WZK6412	Draven von Drekill	2	Male dwarf
Shadowrun Gear Cards – July 2003
Ares Macrotechnology Weapons Tester		0	+2 to Weapon value
Doc Wagon Basic Service		0	Remove 2 clicks of damage
Misuhama Computer Technologies Matrix Certification		0	+2 to a black die just rolled
Novatech Survival Trainee		0	+2 to a yellow die just rolled
Renraku Red Samurai Training Facility		0	+2 to Defense value
Shiawase Biotech Division		0	+2 to Move value
Wuxing, Inc Magic Certification		0	+2 to a red die just rolled^{†}
Yamatetsu Cybernetics Laboratory		0	+2 to a white die just rolled
^{†}Official errata: the card reads "black die" but should read "red die"

Release 3 would have included:

- Cyberzombie (male)
- Decker (female)
- Saeder-Krupp Security Guard
- Scottish Elf (male)
- Street Ganger (male)
- Vampire (female)

== Reception ==
The website OAFE reviewed two of the figurines. The first, "Kellan Colt", was a special publicity release between the first two Series, and received the comment that "The figure doesn't really bear much of a resemblance to the box art, though she is sculpted well." The reviewer also noted that as a money-saving device, the body used the same mold as "Kyushi" from Series 1, and several weapons were "borrowed" from Series 2 figurines. The Second Series figurine "Karkhov" was judged to have excellent sculpting "from the texture of his clothes to the detailing on his weapons." The ball-jointed articulation in the shoulders, pin-jointed elbows, knees, wrists, and peg jointed neck, waist and hips was noted with the comment, "This isn't bad, but more leg articulation - particularly balljointed hips and ankle joints - would have greatly improved this figure."

== Reviews ==
- Syfy

== Awards ==
Shadowrun Duels won the 2003 Origins Awards for Best Science Fiction Miniatures Rules.
