= The Clapper =

Sound activated electrical switch

External videos
- "Clap On! Clap Off! The Clapper". ABC News. July 16, 2009.

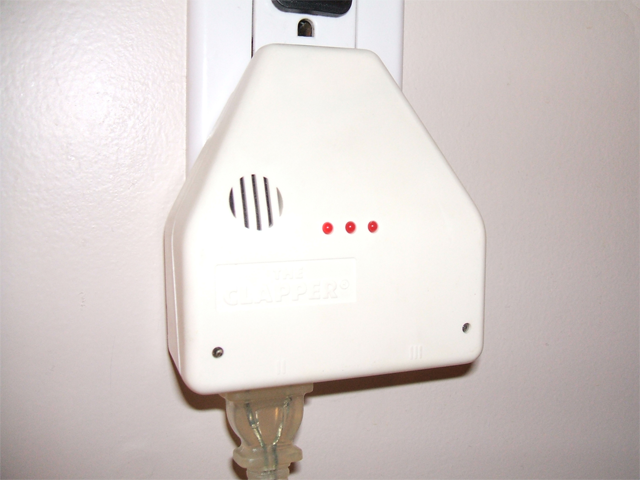
The Clapper with a cord plugged in at bottom

The Clapper is a sound-activated electrical switch, sold since 1984 by San Francisco, California based Joseph Enterprises, Inc. Joseph Pedott marketed the clapper with the slogan "Clap On! Clap Off! The Clapper!".

The Clapper plugs into a U.S.-type electrical outlet, and allows control of up to two devices plugged into the Clapper. An upgraded model, known as the Clapper Plus, includes a remote control function in addition to the original sound-based activation.

Although meant to be activated by clapping, The Clapper can inadvertently be triggered by other noises like dogs barking for example.

== Patent ==
The smart Clapper was invented by Carlile R. Stevens and Dale E. Reamer, and issued U.S. Patent #5493618, had its application filed on May 7, 1993, and was granted on February 20, 1996.
