= Oshi =

Strategy board game

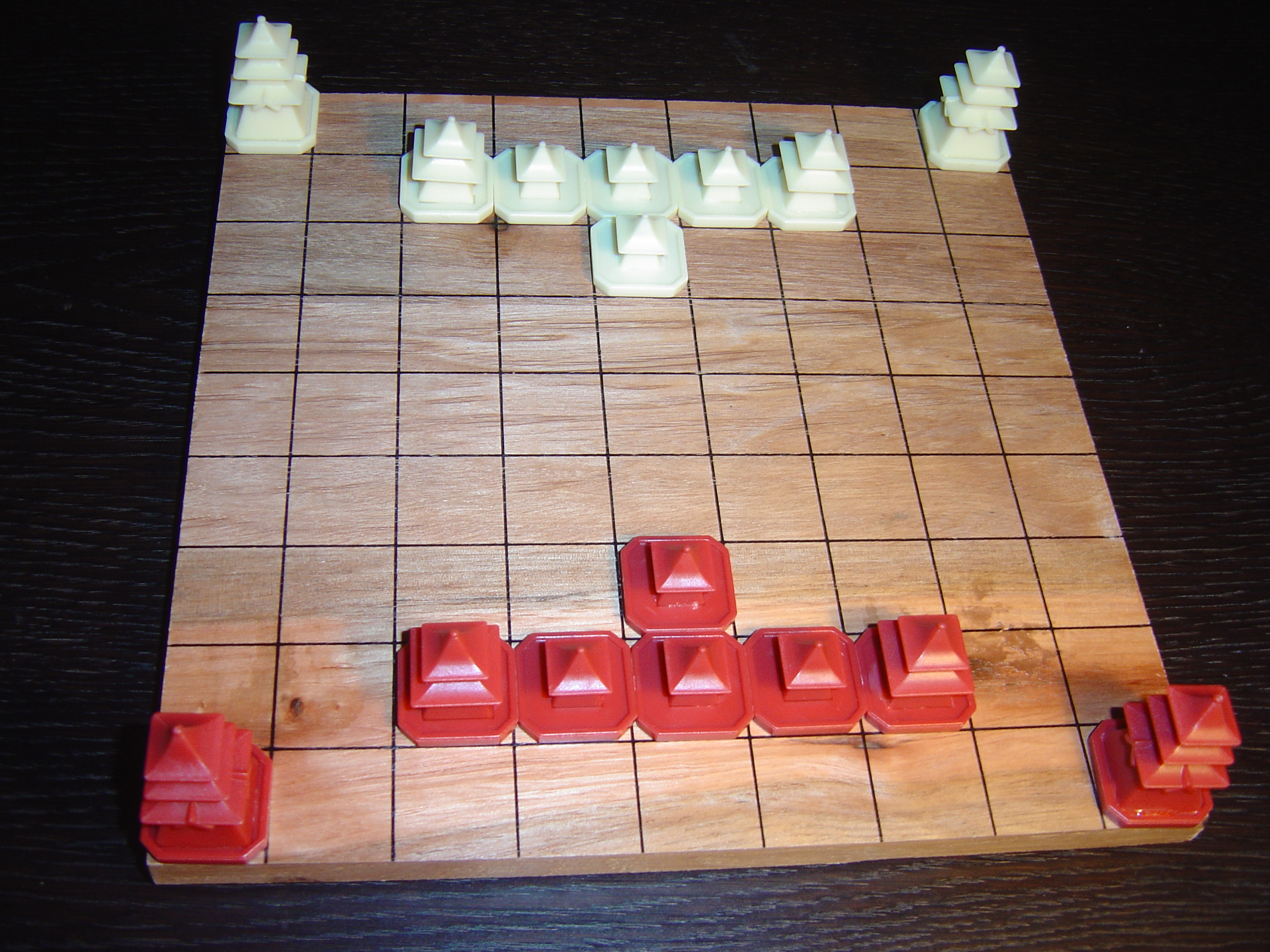
- A game of Oshi set to be started
- Players: 2
- Setup time: < 1 minute
- Playing time: 15 - 20 minutes
- Chance: None
- Age range: 8 +
- Skills: Strategic thought

Oshi (Kanji: 押) is a strategy board game published by WizKids and designed by Tyler Bielman. Oshi is played on a 9×9 board and each player controls a set of 8 pieces (colored oxblood or ivory).

== Story of the game ==
According to the instructions sheet, the game of Oshi was given to the first Emperor of Japan by goddess Amaterasu. Oshi would then teach the emperor and his court that influence was power but should be used cautiously.

== Objective ==
A player wins by pushing 7 points worth of his or her opponent's pieces off the board.

== Reviews ==
A review of Oshi was published in volume 2 of Steve Jackson Games' online magazine, Pyramid. However, the veracity of the review is questionable as it contained several errors about the game, including claims that it was published by Wizards of the Coast instead of WizKids, and that the game was Chinese-themed while simultaneously describing its Japanese Shinto-based lore.
