= Joseph Enterprises =

American gadget company

Joseph Enterprises, Inc.
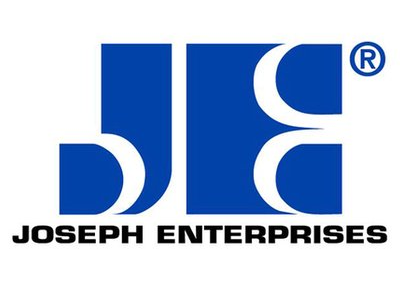
- Company type: Subsidiary
- Industry: Novelty items
- Founded: 1981; 45 years ago
- Founder: Joseph Pedott
- Headquarters: San Francisco, California, United States
- Products: Chia Pet; The Clapper
- Number of employees: 40 (2013)
- Parent: National Entertainment Collectibles Association
- Website: chia.com

Joseph Enterprises, Inc. is an American gadget company owned by the National Entertainment Collectibles Association, a subsidiary of Ad Populum, and founded by Joseph Pedott. It is based in San Francisco, California. Two of their most popular products are The Clapper and the Chia Pet.

== History ==
Joseph Enterprises was founded in California in 1981 by Joseph Pedott. The Clapper, a switch activated by clapping, was first sold to the public on September 1, 1985.

The Chia Pet was first introduced on September 8, 1977, and although its name is trademarked, the Chia Pet is not a patented invention. The first Chia Pet, "Chia Guy", was marketed and distributed in 1977. The first widely marketed Chia Pet, the ram, was marketed and distributed in 1982, although the trademark was not applied for until 1998.

Founder Joseph Pedott died on June 22, 2023, at the age of 91.
