= Marketing of Halo 3 =

Marketing campaign for the video game

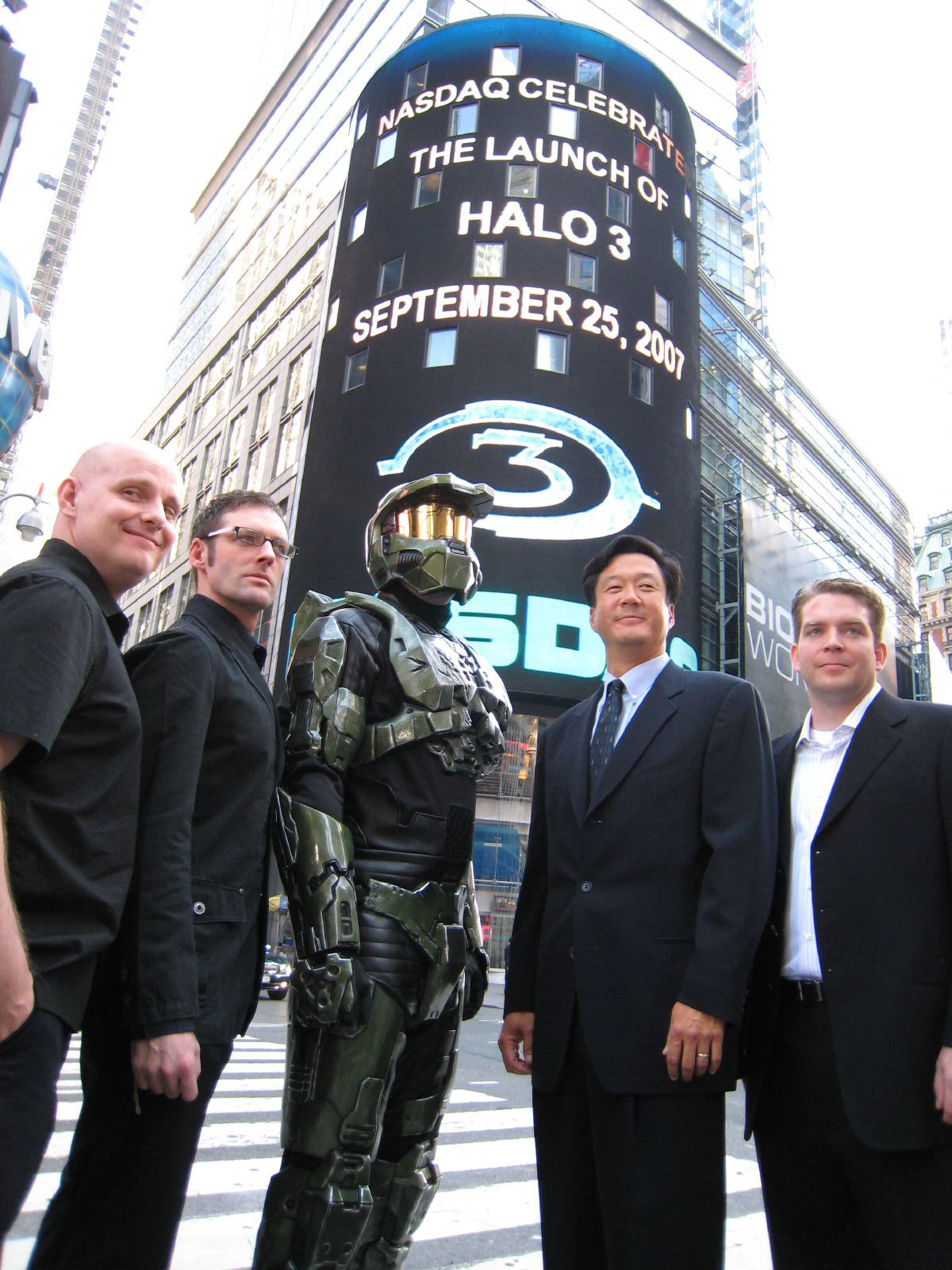
Halo 3's release was celebrated by more than 10,000 launch parties around the world, like this one at the NASDAQ building in New York City.

The first-person shooter video game Halo 3 was the focus of an extensive marketing campaign which began with the game's developer, Bungie, announcing the game via a trailer at the Electronic Entertainment Expo in May 2006. Microsoft, the game's publisher, planned a five-pronged marketing strategy to maximize sales and to appeal to casual and hard-core gamers. Bungie produced trailers and video documentaries to promote the game, partnering with firms such as Digital Domain and Weta Workshop. Licensed products including action figures, toys, and Halo 3-branded soda were released in anticipation of the game; the franchise utilized more than forty licensees to promote the game, and the advertising campaign ultimately cost more than $40 million.

While Halo 2's release had set industry records, the mainstream press was not fully involved in covering the game; part of Microsoft's strategy was to fully involve casual readers and the press in the story. The saturation of advertising and promotions led Wired to state: "The release of Halo 3 this week was an event that stretched far beyond our little gaming world. Everyone from The New York Times to Mother Jones wanted to cover it."

Released on September 25, 2007, Halo 3 became the biggest entertainment debut in history, earning more than $170 million in a few days and selling a record 3,300,000 copies in its first week of sales alone. Halo 3's marketing won several awards, and was cited as evidence of the increasing mainstream popularity of games.

== Development ==
Jerret West, a product manager from Microsoft, said at a marketing conference that Halo 3's marketing team had a mandate from Microsoft executive Peter Moore: "Don't screw up." Much of the marketing organization was handled by Microsoft's former corporate vice president of global marketing, Jeff Bell. A key challenge the team identified early on was that core gamers knew the game was coming out, but there was "a perception problem... we wanted to invite people into the console and into Xbox 360 and to play Halo 3 as a mass-market entertainment product," according to product manager Chris Lee. Since Halo 3 was released as an Xbox 360 exclusive, part of the marketing push was to sell more Xbox consoles, which had encountered sluggish sales.

Microsoft planned advertising and promotions to appeal to both casual and hardcore gamers in a five-pronged marketing strategy. The first stage was to kick off marketing via a television commercial. The second stage was a beta test of the game to drive preorders and press attention. The third stage was the start of an alternate reality game. The fourth phase was partner promotions, capped off with a final advertising campaign, titled "Believe".

Though Microsoft used forms of viral marketing for promotion (including the alternate reality game or ARG), the main focus of the company's efforts was traditional media outlets. Because there already was interest in the title among the gaming community, Microsoft did not feel the need to run a social media campaign, instead banking on the gaming community to spread the word itself. The focus on traditional media would help expand the fan base beyond established gamers and convince the public that the game was a cultural milestone. To build public interest, Microsoft made public statements that Halo 3 would surpass media sales records, including the July 2007 record of $166 million set by the launch of Harry Potter and the Deathly Hallows.

Microsoft's target was to sell 1.5 million copies of the game. Marketing research suggested that the "Halo faithful" could only be counted on to buy 75% of that amount, meaning that 375,000 copies would have to be sold to non-fans. Thus marketing goals were to attract an audience beyond the Halo nation, and to break sales records; in short, to "make Halo 3 a true cultural phenomenon". The team upped their goals to not only selling the target number of copies, but making Halo 3 the biggest entertainment launch ever.

== Promotional videos ==
A significant form of marketing was done by the release of videos. While Bungie often partnered with other companies to create advertisements, they also produced their own video documentaries, or "ViDocs", detailing the behind-the-scenes development of aspects of Halo 3, including redesigning enemy Brutes, additions to multiplayer, and other game features. The first ViDoc was released shortly after the game's announcement and was a "making-of" style video, while the final ViDoc made its debut on September 20, 2007.

=== Trailers and shorts ===
Halo 3 was officially announced via a cinematic trailer rendered in real-time, shown at Microsoft's press conference at E3 2006 on May 9. The trailer is set in the dry plains of Africa, with the ruins of a space elevator and other damage visible. The Master Chief is slowly revealed walking through smoke and dust, occasionally obscured by distorted images of the artificial intelligence Cortana transmitting a message composed of portions of the character's lines in the Cortana Letters, as well as a line from the poem "The Hollow Men". The distorted voice of Cortana was a deliberate clue to the character's predicament in Halo 3, with a Bungie staff member stating, "We don't know what has happened to her...We don't know it's Cortana. It could be any sort of bizarre, almost Satanic sort of voice. Something seems wrong." The trailer featured music by Martin O'Donnell, with the addition of a piano and brass section to the classic Halo theme.

Advertising company McCann Erickson created a second trailer that was aired only once on December 4, 2006. The video used a mix of computer-created graphics and live action; computer graphics were produced by Digital Domain and directed by Joseph Kosinski. The spot, dubbed "Starry Night", was seen by 7.9 million viewers in its broadcast and watched more than 3.5 million times on YouTube by September 2007. The final trailer, shown during E3 2007 on July 11, consisted of actual campaign cinematics and gameplay.

The video teasers for Halo 3 included a series of videos directed by Neill Blomkamp, the proposed director of a possible Halo film produced by Peter Jackson. Unlike previous trailers and videos, the shorts were the first to depict the Halo universe in a live-action setting. The production was a collaboration between Weta Workshop, Neill Blomkamp and Bungie. When asked about the shorts, Neill said that he hoped that it would help to interest movie studios in his currently inactive movie project, since it lost its studio support in October 2006. GameTrailers released a compilation of the three videos edited together, titling it Landfall.

The first live action video, titled Arms Race, was originally shown at Electronic Entertainment Expo 2007. It was followed up by another short, Combat, which featured Covenant and human vehicles and weapons. The final video in the series aired on October 4, 2007 and was used by Discovery Channel to promote their reality show Last One Standing. The short ties the events depicted to the beginning of Halo 3, which begins as the Master Chief plummets to Earth.

=== "Believe" campaign ===
The faces of the marines featured in the "Believe" ads are based on scans of real people.

The last major advertising campaign before and during Halo 3's release was a series of videos marketed with the tagline "Believe", beginning September 11, 2007. These videos, with an estimated cost of $10 million, were directed by Rupert Sanders (known for video game advertisements) and made to depict a generic representation of a single battle in Halo 3. Live-action videos featured elderly war veterans at the "Museum of Humanity" reminiscing about the Human-Covenant war and the role the Master Chief played. The Believe website allowed visitors to pan the length of a massive diorama over 1,200 square feet (110 m^{2}) in size and over twelve feet tall, with handcrafted human and Covenant figures represented at one-twelfth scale. According to Microsoft, the unusual presentation of a model rather than computer graphics was chosen to look at "the themes that lie at the heart of the Halo trilogy—war, duty, sacrifice, and most importantly the heroism of Master Chief." The musical score for the 'Museum of Humanity' video is a selection entitled "For All of Us" and was composed for the video by Jay Green with Big Science Music.

The diorama was built through a collaboration between Los Angeles, California-based New Deal Studios and Stan Winston Studios. Director Rupert Sanders had actors stand in for the marines, capturing their facial expressions and using them as the basis of the miniatures. Character assets from Bungie, including alien models and armor, were recreated and rebuilt for reuse. The twisted city ruins the diorama is set in were inspired by bombed-out Afghanistan suburbs. Special attention was paid to creating a photo-realistic setting which was recognizably Halo.

== Public beta testing ==
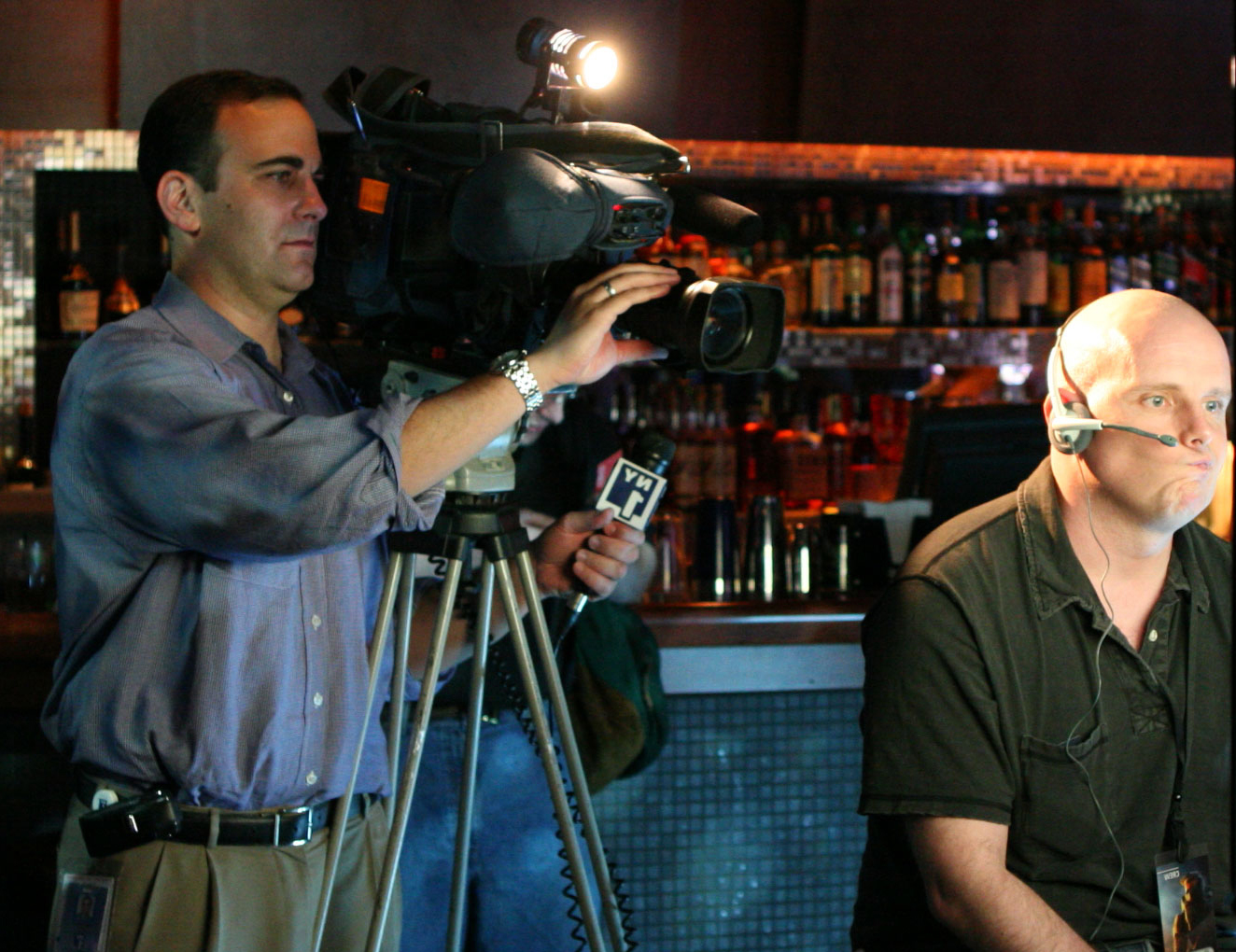
Former Bungie employee Frank O'Connor plays the Halo 3 beta.

On April 10, 2007, Bungie announced that a beta test of the multiplayer component of Halo 3 would run from May 16 to June 6, open to select members of the public. Players could enter the beta in several ways. Testers were selected from those who signed up on the Halo3.com website following the "Starry Night" commercial, or from the first 13,333 players to register after playing three hours of Halo 2 on Xbox Live. Players could also buy a specially-marked copy of the Xbox 360 title Crackdown, which allowed players to download the beta upon its release.

The public portion of the beta consists of matchmaking play on three multiplayer maps: Valhalla, High Ground and Snowbound. The public beta also contained a limited version of the "saved films" feature, which allows players to save and watch their played games. The day the public beta began, problems were reported from owners of Crackdown that they could not download the beta. Bungie announced that the Microsoft team found a solution and that the issue would be resolved shortly; a patch was distributed for Crackdown that fixed the problem. Bungie also extended the beta until June 10 to compensate for the issue. According to Jerret West, global group product manager, allowing users into the beta created "a psychological investment" in the game. "The idea was basically to make the beta launch huge and let the tastemakers make the launch for you... to really drive it beyond the gaming press." The beta caused a spike in preorders for the retail version of the game.

== Alternate reality game ==
A component of Halo 3's marketing was an alternate reality game (ARG) called "Iris". Alternate reality games, which involve cross-media gameplay and player participation, had been previously used for the promotion of Halo 2 in the form of the influential and award-winning I Love Bees. Soon after the Halo 3 public beta ended, a user named "AdjutantReflex" appeared in the official Halo 3 forums on Bungie and began posting. A Circuit City advertisement was leaked onto the web days earlier, revealing the web address of an interactive comic which could be manipulated to reveal the IP addresses of another series of sites. One website was the home of the "Society of the Ancients" a group supposedly interested in evidence of Forerunner artifacts left on Earth. Another featured a Forerunner object which gradually revealed text logs and video clips.

== Merchandise and promotions ==
The Warthog from the ActionClix game

The launch of Halo 3 coincided with the release of various games, action figures, and collectible toys. WizKids developed a Clix collectible miniatures game entitled Halo ActionClix which was released on September 18, 2007. The tabletop game features miniature figures from the Halo universe, including characters and vehicles. Halo ActionClix figures were occasionally bundled with the game in promotional packs, and Gamestation stores in the United Kingdom offered a Master Chief figurine to the first 1000 pre-orders of the Halo 3 Legendary Edition.

While previous Halo action figure series were produced by Joyride Studios, Todd McFarlane produced several sets of Halo 3-related action figures. In addition to articulated figures released throughout 2008, McFarlane also released 12" inarticulate and more detailed figurines in November. Other companies which produced Halo 3 figures and statues include Kotobukiya, a Japanese company specializing in high-end statues and replicas, and Weta Collectibles, a division spawned from the famed physical effects company Weta Workshop. Weta Collectibles auctioned four of the statues in their lineup, specially cast in solid sterling silver, for auction on eBay during August.

Microsoft collaborated with other companies to produce Halo-themed merchandise and promotions at retailers and vendors. PepsiCo created a variant of Mountain Dew called Game Fuel. 7-Eleven sold a Slurpee version of the drink. Burger King announced a special promotion starting September 24, 2007 featuring Halo designs and characters on food wrappings. Microsoft sponsored the #40 car driven by David Stremme for Chip Ganassi Racing in the Dover 400 Nextel Cup Series. The racecar featured a Halo 3 inspired paintjob featuring the title for the game printed prominently on the hood and rear bumper, as well as large pictures of Master Chief on each of the rear fenders.

== Launch and impact ==
More than 10,000 retail stores in the United States held midnight launch parties for Halo's release, in addition to other locations around the globe. Microsoft coordinated its own multiple-city launch parties, and Bungie staff members travelled around the world to host parties, in addition to a launch party held at Bungie's workplace; Larry Hryb attended the New York City launch party. Sponsored launches featured prize giveaways and chances for fans to play Halo against celebrities and Bungie team members. The BFI IMAX Theater in London was devoted to Halo 3, while some areas in the United Kingdom cancelled midnight launches fearing unruliness from the large crowds.

Halo 3 was phenomenally successful upon release. The game made $170 million in US sales on the first day of release, generating more money in 24 hours than any other American entertainment property up to that point. Halo would make an additional $130 million by week's end and sell 3.3 million units by the end of the month. By 2008, Halo 3 had sold 4.8 million units in the United States for a total of 8.1 million units worldwide, making it the best-selling game of 2007 in the United States.

Critics and publications pointed to the massive marketing and launch of Halo 3 as evidence that video games had "finally hit the mainstream". Video game critic Steve West of CinemaBlend.com pointed out the Halo 3 phenomenon as evidence of the mainstreaming of video games, stating that "...Like movies, radio, and television before, games are becoming more and more accepted in the popular culture." To capitalize on the mainstream attention, Joystiq sister site Xbox360Fanboy noted, "Microsoft contends that such a [marketing] push is necessary to maintain the appearance of 'a big budget, mass media event'."

At the PRWeek awards Microsoft won the "Technology Campaign of the Year" along with Edelman for Halo 3's launch. At the 2008 ANDY Awards, the "Believe" campaign won the "GRANDY", the grand prize. Halo 3's advertising also won five "gold cubes", one "silver cube" and two distinctive merit certificates at the Art Directors Club Annual Awards Ceremony, most of the awards relating to the Believe campaign.

Preceded by Evolution	Cannes Lions Film Grand Prix Winner; 2008	Succeeded by Carousel
