= Chia Pet =

Terracotta figurine used to sprout chia

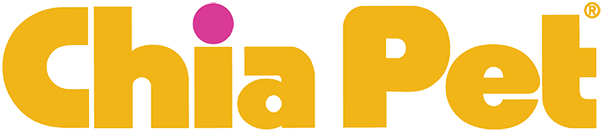
- Product type: Terracotta figurine
- Current owner: Joseph Enterprises
- Produced by: Mexico; China
- Country: United States
- Introduced: 1977; 49 years ago
- Markets: International
- Tagline: Watch It Grow!
- Website: chia.com
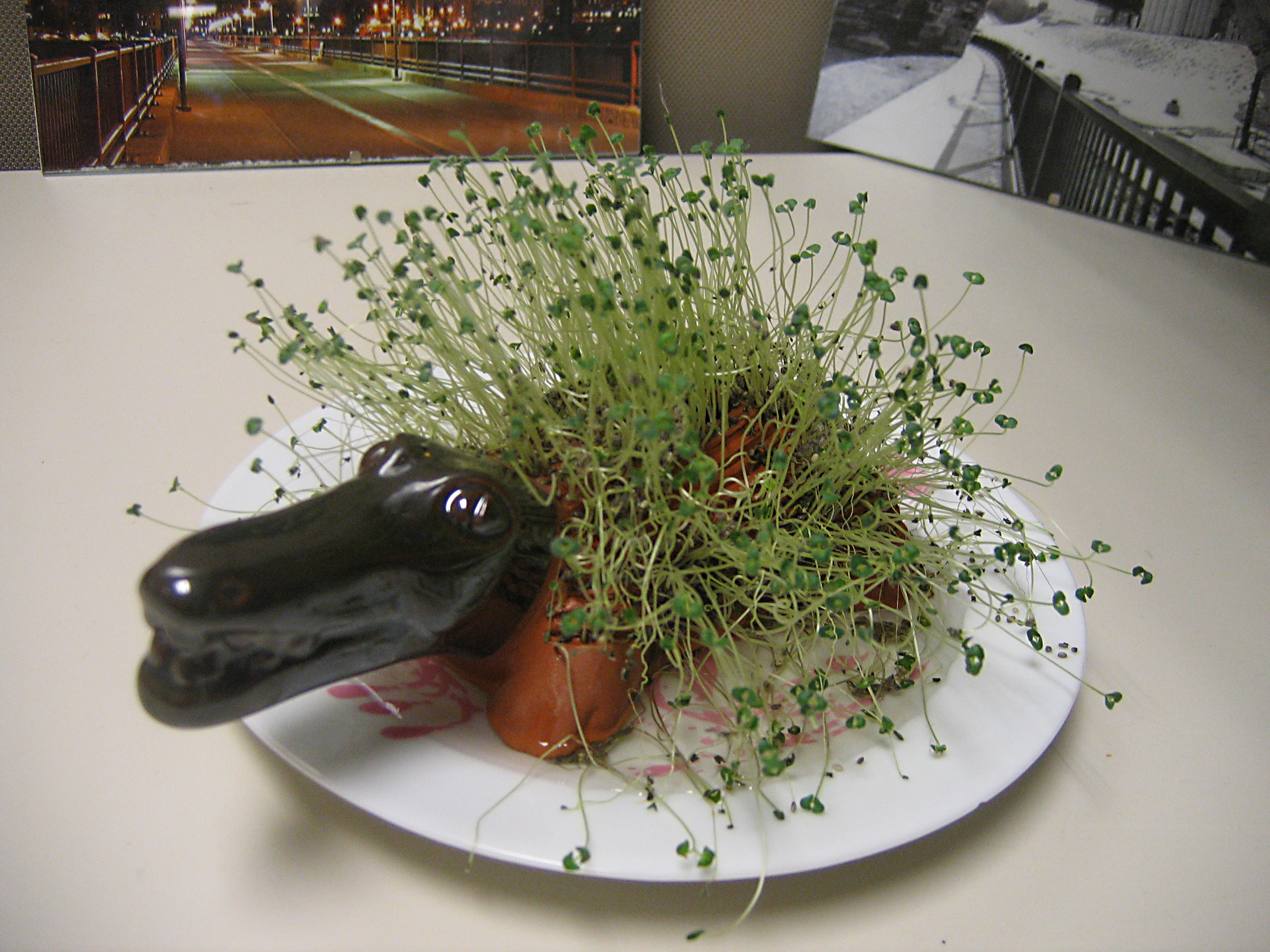
- An alligator Chia Pet

Chia Pets are American styled terracotta figurines used to sprout chia, where the chia sprouts grow within a couple of weeks to resemble the animal's fur or hair. Moistened chia seeds (Salvia hispanica) are applied to a grooved terracotta figurine.

The Chia Pet was marketed and popularized by Joseph Pedott. Pedott first learned about "something called the Chia Pet" being imported from Oaxaca, Mexico, when he attended a housewares show in Chicago in 1977. Negotiating the rights from importer Walter Houston, Pedott began marketing Chia Pets in the US.

The first Chia Pet was created on September 8, 1977. A trademark registration was filed on Monday, October 17, 1977. They were produced by Pedott's San Francisco-based company, Joseph Enterprises, Inc., which was purchased by National Entertainment Collectibles Association in 2018. They achieved popularity in the 1980s following the 1982 release of a ram, the first widely distributed Chia Pet. Originally made in Mexico, Chia Pets are now produced in China.

The catchphrase sung in the TV commercial as the plant grows in time lapse is "Ch-ch-ch-chia!" This catchphrase originated at an agency brainstorming meeting, where one of the individuals present pretended to stutter the product name. As of 2019, approximately 15 million Chia Pets were sold annually, with most sales happening during the holiday season. In 2000, a Chia Pet was included inside a New York Times time capsule to be opened in the year 3000.

A range of generic animals has been produced, including a hedgehog, turtle, pig, puppy, kitten, frog, and hippopotamus. Cartoon characters have also been licensed, including Garfield, Scooby-Doo, Looney Tunes, Shrek, The Simpsons, and SpongeBob. Additionally, there are Chia Pets depicting real people, including Barack Obama, Bob Ross, and Donald Trump.
