= HeroClix =

Collectible miniatures game

- The HeroClix Logo
- Manufacturers: WizKids
- Designers: Monte Cook (2002); Jeff Quick (2002); Mike Mulvihill (2002); Jon Leitheusser (2002–2005); Jeff Grubb (2003); Kelly Bonilla (2008); Scott D'Agostino (2015-2021); Brian Galley (2022-Present); Lead designer: Seth Johnson (2005–Jun 2009); Eric Engelhard (Jul 2009-Apr 2020)
- Publishers: WizKids (2002-2003); The Topps Company (2003-2009); NECA (2009-Present)
- Publication: July 2002; 23 years ago
- Years active: 2002-2008, 2009-present
- Genres: Board game, Dice game, Wargame
- Languages: English
- Systems: Clix
- Players: 2-Unlimited
- Setup time: < 5 minutes
- Playing time: Varies, depending on the point build and number of players
- Chance: Medium (dice rolling)
- Skills: Arithmetic; Reading; Logic; Strategy; Common sense Metagaming; Opportunity cost Wargaming; Tactics; Probability; Die Rolling
- Website: http://www.heroclix.com

HeroClix is a collectible miniatures game that uses the Clix system that centers on the world of superhero comic books, especially DC and Marvel universes. Players construct teams of comic book heroes, villains, or characters from various video games series such as Street Fighter, Gears of War, and Halo and engage in a turn-by-turn battle on grid maps based on various storyline locations. The game was originally designed and produced by WizKids, but was discontinued in November 2008 when WizKids owner Topps shut down their HeroClix line. In September 2009, collectible toy producer National Entertainment Collectibles Association (NECA) purchased some of the WizKids' intellectual property from Topps, including the HeroClix rights, and then soon after began to produce and sell new HeroClix series.

== Game history ==
The HeroClix game utilizes the "combat dial system" originally created for the Mage Knight game. The Combat Dial keeps track of a figure's game statistics via a rotating dial in the base. As the figure suffers damage, the dial is turned a required number of "clicks" to reveal new stats and possibly special abilities. HeroClix was designed to appeal to comic book fans and players of wargames and subsequently also became collector items due to the quality of detail in the HeroClix figures. The first game set, Marvel's Infinity Challenge, was released in 2002 and included figures and maps. The original HeroClix figures were all from comic books printed by Marvel Comics, but later expanded to include sets from DC Comics and from various independent comic book publishers such as Image Comics and Dark Horse Comics. Later expansions also added new card-based mechanics such as "Feats" and "Battlefield Conditions", expanding the game beyond the addition of new characters. The Original HeroClix won three awards at the 2002 Origins Awards including Best Science Fiction or Fantasy Game Board Game for Marvel HeroClix: Infinity Challenge, "Best Board Game Expansion Or Supplement" and "Best Science Fiction Or Fantasy Miniature" for the Sentinel Figure. WizKids had a prize support system for organized tournaments at comic book and hobby shops, as well as regionally and nationally, consisting of special limited edition variant figures given to winners. National Entertainment Collectibles Association (NECA), the current owners of the HeroClix rights, resumed this practice in 2009.

WizKids, the company behind the HeroClix game, was acquired by The Topps Company in 2003. Topps later announced that as of November 10, 2008, Wizkids was ceasing production of all its product lines, including HeroClix. Scott Silverstein, CEO of Topps, said:

This was an extremely difficult decision. While the company will still actively pursue gaming initiatives, we feel it is necessary to align our efforts more closely with Topps' current sports and entertainment offerings which are being developed within our New York office.

— Scott Silverstein

The HeroClix property was expected to be sold off to a 3rd party in May 2009, but the two parties were unable to come to an agreement. While a Marvel license "to manufacture figures and card games" had been acquired by Upper Deck Company, that license specifically excluded the HeroClix game and concept. Topps owned all the rights and licenses for all versions of HeroClix, giving them the rights to sell the license to a third party. There were three companies known to be interested in acquiring the WizKids properties: Catalyst Game Labs, which works primarily on print role playing games; Piñata Games, formed by HeroClix fans and former Wizkids employees with the primary purpose of buying and continuing the HeroClix line; and a newly formed third company. However, Catalyst withdrew from the bids, Justin Ziran of Piñata joined Topps instead and the third company failed to get funding. NECA announced that it had purchased the majority of the Wizkids properties, including HeroClix, on September 15, 2009. Beginning on July 28, 2009, NECA began selling the "Thor's Mighty Chariot" large figure at conventions in North America. Since this game piece had not been released by Wizkids, it came as no surprise that NECA had purchased the brand. The relaunch of HeroClix occurred with the release of the "Hammer of Thor" series in November 2009, the first series under the management of NECA.

== Gameplay ==
HeroClix diagram from the Core Rulebook.

Each HeroClix figurine is modeled in the approximate equivalence of the O scale for model train sets with a figure based on the design of the comic book character and a dial base that contains all statistics for the specific figure, such as Point Value, Range, Experience, Speed, Attack Value, Defense Value, and Damage.

HeroClix diagram from the Core Rulebook.

These statistics are all printed on a dial that serves as the base for the miniature. When a piece takes "damage", its base is turned a number of "clicks" clockwise, revealing altered stats to correspond to the damage it has taken from an attack. Most damage weakens characters, although some actually get stronger when wounded, to represent a transformation or rage. Pieces have an overall point value assigned, representing how powerful they are. Team creation is restricted to a predetermined total point value for the HeroClix figures, which is usually in multiples of 100. The Range value indicates how far away a character can attack another character and if they are able to attack multiple characters at once, generally defined based on the powers of each figure. Originally, characters would appear in multiple rarities with altered statistics. These altered stats represented the "Experience" of the character, ranging from "Rookie" (yellow ring on base) over "Experienced" (blue ring) to "Veteran" (red ring), (although this is no longer used) the more experienced a character is the higher the stats usually are. As a result, the point value would also be higher. Some characters have multiple point values, and have multiple corresponding starting positions. The trait symbol corresponds to a character's Character Card. A Character Card is a card specific to a particular HeroClix character. If for some reason you do not have the corresponding Character Card for your miniature, it is available through the Print and Play System on the WizKids Website. Character cards outline which abilities the character will have on its dial, but does not say where they will be on the dial. Also, it shows special traits and abilities would otherwise be too complex to communicate on the Combat Dial. Many of these abilities are completely unique to the characters that possess them.

The HeroClix game can be played by arbitrarily many players in principle, although the HeroClix rulebook recommends two to four players in practice. The Battles are played out on maps, overlaid with a grid of 35 mm x 35 mm squares. These maps generally come in two different sizes 3 ft by 3 ft (36" by 36") or 2 ft by 3 ft (36" by 24") (with the exception of the Marvel Universe Starter Map which was 13 by 13 squares). The maps used are of different locations found in a typical comic book story, often related to the "theme" of the HeroClix series the map was produced for. The older maps were generic places but recently the maps have taken on more comic-book-specific places, such as the Justice Society Museum. Participants take turn moving or attacking other players, using 2 six-sided dice to determine the success or failure or of their attacks. Games can be time limited or played until all other teams are eliminated.

=== Storyline Organized Play ===
As part of their promotional efforts WizKids holds a number of events throughout the year, focusing on month-spanning tournament events that play out like a comic book storyline called "Storyline Organized Play". Stores participate in tournaments and receive exclusive figures and promotional items to offer their players for each month's Storyline Organized Play tournament(s). The events can span up to six months and have an overall, across all stores leaderboard that tallies all officially participating stores.

== HeroClix series ==
=== Main series ===
HeroClix normally releases their figure sets in series, often including maps that are specific to the theme of the series. All series are product specific. The series often include starter packs, boosters, limited editions and individual figures. HeroClix's longest and most prominent runs include characters from Marvel Comics and DC Comics, as well as Mirage Studios' Teenage Mutant Ninja Turtles.

HeroClix has also featured smaller runs of figures for various other franchises or series, including Assassin's Creed, BioShock, Dota 2, Gears of War, Halo, Iron Maiden, Lone Ranger, Mage Knight, Middle-earth, Pacific Rim, Star Trek, Street Fighter, and WWE. All figures are mutually compatible, except for the ships from Star Trek HeroClix, (the figures from the Away Team pack are compatible as normal). These compatible figures can be played in the same game under the "Golden Age" rules. None of these sets, nor any sets released under the Indy brand, can be played in Modern Age tournaments as the rules exclude anything not under the DC, Marvel or Street Fighter brands, as of the rule update of April 26, 2012. However the WWE miniatures released with their own ruleset and powers-and-abilities card. They can be played in their own universe games with modern age Heroclix rules, or even alongside Marvel or DC in "Multiverse games" where the rules are changed a bit to help buff the WWE superstars.

=== Expansions ===
At times, the HeroClix producers have introduced additional figures and maps to either coincide with an event or to further enhance an existing HeroClix series. These have been promoted under names such as "Action Pack", "Fast Forces", "Battle Packs" or "Starter Set". Most of these packs include a number of characters, as well as maps and cards related to the theme of the pack. The Infinity Challenge, Hypertime and Indy starter sets all contained random characters from the full set. The Premiere sets contained specific figures. Starting with the "Universe" series, Starter sets contained figures not found in regular booster packs.

=== Limited release figures ===
Some of the HeroClix figures were only released in limited quantities, which meant that the number of figures produced was significantly less than the rest of the figure series, making the odds of finding a figure lower, or they are produced for a special event only and not for general retail. The limited numbers often result in the figures gaining a higher value in the resale market. These limited number figures can be referred to as "Chases" if they can be found through general purchase or simply "LE" for limited edition if they are event specific.

To help "brick-and-mortar" stores compete against internet retail stores HeroClix used a "Buy it By the Brick" promotion for a number of their series. A ClixBrick consisted of 12 shrink-wrapped boosters that included a special coupon for consumers who purchased HeroClix at their local retailer. Consumers who sent in 12 UPC codes, the coupon, and the receipt from that one-time retail purchase received a special free figure, only obtainable through the ClixBrick offer, as well another coupon that allowed the customer to purchase the Collector's Set associated with each release at a 25% discount. The ClixBrick promotion was discontinued but WizKids do offer special "store exclusive" offers that retailers can use as game prizes for purchase incentives.

Large figures

HeroClix produced a limited number of large based figures, normally four times the size of a regular figure, but even larger bases exist. These figures are produced in a limited number and at a higher price and at times only sold at gaming or comic book conventions

Team bases

In 2013 HeroClix introduced the concept of a "Team Base", a larger base where figures can be slotted into for team play. These will be available as part of the "Teen Titans" line and feature a base for the Teen Titans (Robin, Wonder Girl, Cyborg, Raven, Starfire, Changeling and Kid Flash) and "Teen Titans: Villains for Hire" (Deathstroke, Cheshire, Cinder, Tattooed Man and Osiris). Each base comes with some of the figures while the rest will have to be purchased separately. HeroClix has published modified rules for the use of the team bases.
