= National Entertainment Collectibles Association =

American toy manufacturer

National Entertainment Collectibles Association Inc.
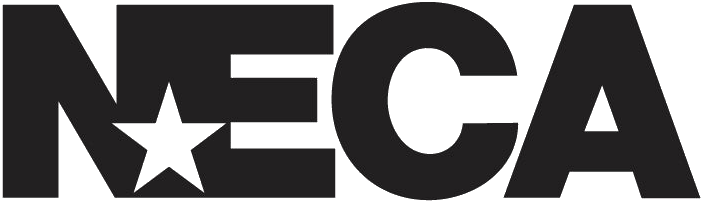
- Type: Private
- Industry: Entertainment
- Founded: 1996; 30 years ago
- Headquarters: Hillside, NJ, U.S.
- Number of locations: 1
- Key people: Joel Weinshanker (president & CEO); Randy Falk (Director of Product Development)
- Products: Action figures, figurines
- Number of employees: 40
- Divisions: Reel Toys
- Subsidiaries: Kidrobot; WizKids; Joseph Enterprises
- Website: necaonline.com

National Entertainment Collectibles Association Inc. (mostly known by its acronym NECA) is an American manufacturer of collectibles typically licensed from films, video-games, sports, music, and television based in New Jersey. The company was founded in 1996 and has over 60 licenses for which it produces products.

In 2002, "NECA's Reel Toys" was formed as a division to produce toys, action figures and dolls that are targeted towards action figure and toy enthusiasts. They are intended for teens and adults as collectibles for many licenses that no other company would market as a toy.

On September 14, 2009, they announced acquisition of the WizKids assets from Topps, for the collectible miniature Clix games and Pocketmodel games.

== NECA Licenses (current and past) ==
- "Weird Al" Yankovic
- 9
- 300
- A Christmas Story
- AC/DC
- Ace Ventura: Pet Detective
- Adventure Time
- Alien
  - Aliens
- Alien 3
  - Alien 3 (NES game)
  - Alien: Covenant
  - Alien: Isolation
  - Aliens: Fireteam Elite
  - Alien Resurrection
  - Alien vs. Predator (2004)
  - Aliens vs. Predator: Requiem
  - Alien vs. Predator (arcade game)
- A Nightmare on Elm Street (1984)
  - A Nightmare on Elm Street (NES game)
  - A Nightmare on Elm Street 2: Freddy's Revenge
  - A Nightmare on Elm Street 3: Dream Warriors
  - A Nightmare on Elm Street 4: The Dream Master
  - A Nightmare on Elm Street 5: The Dream Child
  - A Nightmare on Elm Street (2010)
- An American Werewolf in London
- American Gods
- American Psycho
- Army of Darkness
- Army of Two
- Arrow
- Ash vs Evil Dead
- Assassin's Creed
  - Assassin's Creed II
  - Assassin's Creed: Brotherhood
  - Assassin's Creed: Revelations
- The Avengers
  - Avengers: Age of Ultron
  - Avengers: Infinity War
- Back to the Future
  - Back to the Future Part II
  - Back to the Future Part III
- Batman (1966 TV series)
  - Batman (1989)
  - Batman (NES game)
  - Batman: Arkham City
  - Batman Begins
  - Batman Returns
  - Batman v Superman: Dawn of Justice
  - The Joker (The Dark Knight)
- Beetlejuice
- Bill & Ted
- BioShock 2
  - BioShock Infinite
- Blade Runner 2049
- Bob Marley
- Bob Ross
- The Boondock Saints
- Borderlands
- The Boys (TV series)
- Bubba Ho-Tep
- Bulletstorm
- Candyman: Farewell to the Flesh
- Captain America: Civil War
- Carrie
- Castlevania
- Charmed
- Chia Pet
- Child's Play
  - Child's Play 2
  - Child's Play 3
  - Bride of Chucky
  - Cult of Chucky
  - Curse of Chucky
  - Seed of Chucky
- The Chronicles of Narnia
- Clash of the Titans (2010)
- Commando (1985)
- Conan the Barbarian (1982)
- Contra
- Coraline
- Crash Bandicoot
- Creature from the Black Lagoon
- Creed
  - Creed II
- Creepshow
- The Crow
- DC Comics
- Dante's Inferno
- Daredevil
- The Dark Crystal
- The Dark Knight
  - The Dark Knight Rises
- Dawn of the Dead (1978)
- Dawn of the Planet of the Apes
- Deadpool
- Dead Space (franchise)
- Death Proof
- The Devil's Backbone
- Devil May Cry
- The Devil's Rejects
- Devo
- Die Hard
- Divergent
- Django Unchained
- Doctor Strange
- Donnie Darko
- Dota 2
- Dracula (1931)
- Duke Nukem Forever
- E.T. the Extra-Terrestrial
- Escape from New York
- Elf
- Elvira
- Elvis Presley
- The Evil Dead
  - Evil Dead II
- The Exorcist
- First Blood
- Five Nights at Freddy's
- The Fog
- Frankenstein (1931)
- Freddie Mercury
- Freddy's Dead: The Final Nightmare
- Freddy vs. Jason (2003)
- Friday the 13th (1980)
  - Friday the 13th (NES video game)
  - Friday the 13th Part II
  - Friday the 13th Part III
  - Friday the 13th: The Final Chapter
  - Friday the 13th: A New Beginning
  - Friday the 13th Part VI: Jason Lives
  - Friday the 13th Part VII: The New Blood
  - Friday the 13th Part VIII: Jason Takes Manhattan
  - Friday the 13th (2009)
- Gargoyles
- Ghostbusters
  - Ghostbusters II
- Gears of War
  - Gears of War 2
  - Gears of War 3
- Godzilla (1954 film)
  - Godzilla, King of the Monsters!
  - The Return of Godzilla
  - Godzilla: Monster of Monsters!
  - Godzilla vs. Biollante
  - Godzilla vs. SpaceGodzilla
  - Godzilla vs. Destoroyah
  - Godzilla, Mothra and King Ghidorah: Giant Monsters All-Out Attack
  - Godzilla: Tokyo S.O.S.
  - Godzilla (2014 film)
  - Godzilla: King of the Monsters (2019 film)
- God of War (2005)
  - God of War II
  - God of War III
  - God of War (2018)
- The Golden Girls
- Green Day
- Gremlins (1984)
  - Gremlins 2: The New Batch (1990)
  - Gremlins: Gizmo (NES game)
- Grindhouse
- Guardians of the Galaxy
  - Guardians of the Galaxy Vol. 2
- Half-Life 2
- Halo
- Halloween (1978)
  - Halloween II (1981)
  - Halloween III: Season of the Witch
  - Halloween: The Curse of Michael Myers
  - Halloween H20: 20 Years Later
  - Halloween: Resurrection
  - Halloween (2007)
  - Halloween (2018)
  - Halloween Kills
  - Halloween Ends
- Harry Potter
- The Hateful Eight
- Hatchet
- Hellraiser
- Heroes of the Storm
- Highlander
- The Hitchhiker's Guide to the Galaxy
- Home Alone
- House of 1000 Corpses
- The Hobbit
- The Howling
- Hulk
- The Hunger Games
  - The Hunger Games: Catching Fire
- Iggy Pop
- Insane Clown Posse
- Interstellar
- It (1990)
  - It (2017)
  - It Chapter Two (2019)
- Iron Maiden
- Iron Man (2008 film)
- Iron Man 2
- Iron Man 3
- Jason Goes to Hell: The Final Friday
- Jason X
- Jaws
- Jeff Dunham
- Jimmy Page
- John Lennon
- Johnny Ramone
- Joey Ramone
- Jonah Hex
- Justice League
- Kangaroo Jack
- The Karate Kid
- Kick-Ass 2
- Kill Bill
  - Kill Bill 2
- King Features Syndicate
- King Kong
- King Kong vs. Godzilla
- Kurt Cobain
- Labyrinth
- Leatherface: The Texas Chainsaw Massacre III
- Left 4 Dead
  - Left 4 Dead 2
- LittleBigPlanet
- The Lone Ranger (2013)
- The Lord of the Rings
- The Lost Boys
- Machete
  - Machete Kills
- Man of Steel
- Masters of the Universe
- Marvel Comics
- M3GAN
- Men in Black II
- Misfits
- Mothra vs. Godzilla
- Muhammad Ali
- The Munsters
- My Bloody Valentine
- National Lampoon's Christmas Vacation
- Night of the Demons
- The Nightmare Before Christmas
- Ninja Gaiden II
- Overwatch
- Pacific Rim (2013)
- Pacific Rim Uprising (2018)
- Pan's Labyrinth
- Pee-wee's Playhouse
- Pirates of the Caribbean
- Phantasm
- Planet of the Apes
- Planet Terror
- Portal 2
- Preacher
- Predator
  - Predator (NES game)
  - Predator 2
- Predators
- The Predator
- The Princess Bride
- Prototype
- Prometheus
- Pulp Fiction
- Puppet Master
- Quentin Tarantino
- Rambo: First Blood Part II
  - Rambo (NES game)
- Re-Animator
- Reservoir Dogs
- Resident Evil
  - Resident Evil 4
  - Resident Evil 5
- Robert Rodriguez
- RoboCop
  - RoboCop (NES game)
  - RoboCop 3
  - RoboCop Vs The Terminator
  - RoboCop Vs Terminator
- Rocky
  - Rocky (NES game)
  - Rocky II
  - Rocky III
  - Rocky IV
- The Rocky Horror Picture Show
- Scarface
- Saw
- Scream 4
- Sesame Street
- The Shape of Water
- Shaun of the Dead
- Shin Godzilla
- The Silence of the Lambs
- Silent Night, Deadly Night
- The Simpsons
- Sin City (film)
- Spider-Man: Homecoming
- Splinter Cell: Conviction
- Star Trek
- Street Fighter
- Street Fighter IV
  - Suicide Squad
- Superman: The Movie
- Sweeney Todd: The Demon Barber of Fleet Street (2007 film)
- Team Fortress 2
- Teenage Mutant Ninja Turtles
- The Terminator
  - Terminator 2: Judgment Day
  - Terminator 2: Judgment Day (NES game)
  - Terminator 3: Rise of the Machines
  - Terminator: Dark Fate
  - Terminator Genisys
  - Terminator Salvation
- The Texas Chain Saw Massacre
  - The Texas Chain Saw Massacre (Atari game)
  - The Texas Chainsaw Massacre 2
  - The Texas Chainsaw Massacre (2003)
  - The Texas Chainsaw Massacre: The Beginning
- The Thing
- They Live
- Thor: The Dark World
- Tomb Raider (franchise)
- Trick 'r Treat
- Twilight
  - The Twilight Saga: Eclipse
  - The Twilight Saga: New Moon
- Uncharted 4: A Thief's End
- Universal Classic Monsters
- Up in Smoke
- Usagi Yojimbo
- V for Vendetta
- Valerian and the City of a Thousand Planets
- Venom
- The Walking Dead
- Watchmen
- Wes Craven's New Nightmare
- What We Do in the Shadows
- The Wolf Man (1941)
- Wonder Woman
- The Year Without a Santa Claus
- Yu-Gi-Oh!

== See also ==
- Good Smile Company
- Star Wars: The Black Series
- Bandai
