= Star Trek: Attack Wing =

Board game

- Star Trek: Attack Wing logo
- Manufacturers: Wizkids
- Designers: Andrew Parks & Christopher Guild
- Publishers: Wizkids Games
- Publication: 2013
- Years active: 2013 to present
- Genres: Wargaming
- Players: 2-Any amount
- Playing time: 30-45 Minutes
- Chance: Medium (dice rolling)
- Website: http://wizkidsgames.com/startrek/star-trek-attack-wing/

Star Trek: Attack Wing is a multiplayer tabletop game set within the Star Trek "universe". It is produced by WizKids and was first released to retail in August, 2013.

Players assume the roles of commanders who can customize, upgrade, and assign famous crew members to their fleets from the Dominion, Federation, Klingon, and Romulan factions. Fleets have their special statistics, abilities, and unique maneuvers displayed on cards that cover the ships along with upgrades such as crew, weapons and technology. The game utilizes the "FlightPath maneuver system" for its gaming mechanics, under license from Fantasy Flight Games.

Additional gaming scenarios from the Dominion Wars will be playable on space maps distributed through an Organized Play Program.

The game's painted ship molds are identical to those utilized in the Star Trek: Tactics games, although the Federation faction ships in Attack Wing do not have names or registries painted onto their hulls. Unpainted versions of some of the ship molds were also previously released in the Star Trek: Fleet Captains game.

A unique promotional Khan Singh Captain card was released exclusively at the Gen Con gaming convention in August 2013.

== Core Game Sets ==
The core sets, which is required to play the game, includes rules, Quick Start rules, Ship, Captain, Crew and Upgrade cards, Range ruler, manoeuvre rulers, game tokens, and pre painted plastic ships.

=== Original: Starter Set Ships ===
| Faction | Unique Starship | Generic Starship Class |
|---|---|---|
| Klingon | IKS Maht-h'a | Vorcha-class |
| Federation | USS Enterprise D | Galaxy-class |
| Romulan | IRW Khazara | D'deridex-class |

=== Federation vs. Klingons: Starter Set Ships ===
| Faction | Unique Starship | Generic Starship Class |
|---|---|---|
| Federation | USS Enterprise D | Galaxy-class |
| Federation | USS Sutherland | Nebula-class |
| Klingon | IKS K’m’pec’s | Vor'cha-class |
| Klingon | IKS Vorn | K’vort-class |

=== Alliance: Dominion War - Campaign Part I ===
| Faction | Generic Starship Class |
|---|---|
| Federation | Excelsior-class |
| Federation | Akira-class |
| Dominion | Attack Ship |

=== Alliance: Dominion War - Campaign Part II ===
| Faction | Generic Starship Class |
|---|---|
| Klingon | Vor'cha-class |
| Klingon | K'Vort-class |
| Dominion | Galor-class |
| Dominion | Battle Cruiser |

=== Alliance: Dominion War - Campaign Part III ===
| Faction | Generic Starship Class |
|---|---|
| Romulan | D'deridex-class |
| Dominion | Battle Cruiser |
| Dominion | Battle Ship |

Star Trek: Attack Wing starter set and expansion packs.

== Expansions ==
Expansion packs include cards, a movement dial, tokens and are sold individually in transparent plastic packaging.

=== Ship Packs ===
| Ship | Class | Faction | Wave |
|---|---|---|---|
| U.S.S. Enterprise | Constitution | Federation | 0 |
| U.S.S. Reliant | Miranda | Federation | 0 |
| I.K.S. Gr'oth | D7 | Klingon | 0 |
| I.K.S. Negh'var | Negh'var | Klingon | 0 |
| I.R.W. Valdore | Valdore | Romulan | 0 |
| R.I.S. Apnex | Science | Romulan | 0 |
| Gor Portas | Battlecruiser | Breen (Dominion) | 0 |
| Kraxon | Galor | Cardassian (Dominion) | 0 |
| U.S.S. Defiant | Defiant | Federation | 1 |
| I.K.S. Kronos One | K’t’inga | Klingon | 1 |
| I.R.W. Praetus | T'varo | Romulan | 1 |
| 5th Wing Patrol Ship | Attackship | Jem’Hadar (Dominion) | 1 |
| U.S.S. Excelsior | Excelsior | Federation | 2 |
| I.K.S. Koraga | K’vort | Klingon | 2 |
| R.I.S. Vo | Theta | Romulan | 2 |
| Koranak | Keldon | Cardassian (Dominion) | 2 |
| U.S.S. Equinox | Nova | Federation | 3 |
| I.K.S. Somraw | Raptor | Klingon | 3 |
| I.R.W. Gal Gath'thong | Vas Hatham | Romulan | 3 |
| 4th Division Battleship | Battleship | Jem’Hadar (Dominion) | 3 |
| U.S.S. Voyager | Intrepid | Federation | 4 |
| Borg Sphere 4270 | Scoutship | Borg | 4 |
| Bioship Alpha | Organic | Species 8472 | 4 |
| Nistrim Raider | Raider | Kazon | 4 |
| Tactical Cube 138 | Tactical | Borg | 5 |
| Interceptor 5 | Intercptor | Bajoran | 5 |
| D'kyr | D’kyr | Vulcan | 5 |
| U.S.S. Enterprise Refit | Constitution | Federation | 6 |
| Soong | Type 03 | Borg | 6 |
| 2nd Division Cruiser | Battlecruiser | Jem’Hadar (Dominion) | 6 |
| Enterprise NX-01 | NX | Federation | 7 |
| Scout 608 | Recon | Borg | 7 |
| Ni'var | Suurok | Vulcan | 7 |
| U.S.S. Enterprise E | Sovereign | Federation | 8 |
| Queen Vessel Prime | Octahedron | Borg | 8 |
| Val Jean | Raider | Maquis | 8 |
| I.S.S. Defiant | Defiant | Mirror (Terran Resistance Forces) | 9 |
| Chang's Bird-of-Prey | Bird-Of-Prey | Klingon | 9 |
| Scimitar | Warbird | Romulan | 9 |
| Regent's Flagship | Negh’var | Mirror (Klingon Cardassian Alliance) | 10 |
| 1st Wave Attack Fighters | Hideki | Cardassian (Dominion) | 10 |
| Fina Prime | Battlecruiser | Vidiian | 10 |
| Prototype 01 | Drone | Romulan | 11 |
| Alpha Hunter | Hunting | Hirogen | 11 |
| Fighter Squadron 6 | Attackship | Federation | 11 |
| Ogla Razik | Predator | Kazon | 12 |
| I.R.W. Haakona | D'deridex | Romulan | 12 |
| Tholian One | Spinner | Tholian | 12 |
| Gornarus | Raider | Gorn | 13 |
| I.S.S. Enterprise | Constitution | Mirror (Terran) | 13 |
| Reklar | Galor | Cardassian (Dominion) | 13 |
| I.S.S. Avenger | NX | Mirror (Terran) | 14 |
| Kyana Prime | Weapon | Krenim | 14 |
| U.S.S. Pegasus | Oberth | Federation | 14 |
| I.K.S. Ning’tao | B’rel | Klingon | 15 |
| Ratosha | Scout | Bajoran | 15 |
| U.S.S. Prometheus | Prometheus | Federation | 15 |
| U.S.S. Dauntless | Dauntless | Species 116 | 16 |
| Kreechta | D’kora | Ferengi | 16 |
| U.S.S. Pasteur | Olympic | Mirror (Terran) | 16 |
| U.S.S. Thunderchild | Akira | Federation | 17 |
| I.K.S. T'ong | K’t’inga | Klingon | 17 |
| I.R.W. Vrax | Valdore | Romulan | 17 |
| U.S.S. Phoenix | Nebula | Federation | 18 |
| Bioship Beta | Organic | Species 8472 | 18 |
| Quark's Treasure | Shuttle | Ferengi | 18 |
| U.S.S. Delta Flyer | Shuttle | Federation | 19 |
| I.K.S. Rotarran | B’rel | Klingon | 19 |
| R.I.S. Talvath | Science | Romulan | 19 |
| U.S.S. Hathaway | Constellation | Federation | 20 |
| Halik Raider | Raider | Kazon | 20 |
| Scorpion 4 | Scorpion | Romulan | 20 |
| Robinson (5th Wing Patrol Ship) | Attackship | Federation | 21 |
| Denorios | Solar | Bajoran | 21 |
| Dreadnought | ATR-4107 | Cardassian (Dominion) | 21 |
| U.S.S. Valiant | Definat | Federation | 22 |
| R.I.S. Pi | Theta | Romulan | 22 |
| Kumari | Battlecruiser | Adorian | 22 |
| I.K.S. Amar | K’t’inga | Klingon | 23 |
| I.R.W. Jazkal | Bird-Of-Prey | Romulan | 23 |
| U.S.S. Montgolfier | Saber | Federation | 23 |
| U.S.S. Enterprise (Reprint) | Constitution | Federation | 24 |
| I.R.W. Algeron | D7 | Romulan | 24 |
| I.K.S. Drovana | Vor’cha | Klingon | 24 |
| I.K.S. Negh’var (Reprint) | Negh'var | Klingon | 25 |
| U.S.S. Venture | Galaxy | Federation | 25 |
| Scimitar (Reprint) | Warbird | Romulan | 25 |
| U.S.S. Enterprise B | Excelsior | Federation | 26 |
| U.S.S. Voyager (Reprint) | Intrepid | Federation | 26 |
| Koranak (Reprint) | Keldon | Cardassian (Dominion) | 26 |
| U.S.S. Enterprise E (Reprint) | Sovereign | Federation | 27 |
| Orassin | Warship | Xindi | 27 |
| I.K.S. Gr’oth (Reprint) | D7 | Klingon | 27 |
| Calindra | Battlecruiser | Xindi | 28 |
| Borg Sphere 4270 (Reprint) | Scoutship | Borg | 28 |
| U.S.S. Defiant (Reprint) | Defiant | Federation | 28 |
| Muratas | Warship | Xindi | 29 |
| Bioship Alpha (Reprint) | Organic | Species 8472 | 29 |
| U.S.S. Excelsior (Reprint) | Excelsior | Federation | 29 |
| U.S.S. Reliant (Reprint) | Miranda | Federation | 30 |
| I.R.W. Valdore (Reprint) | Valdore | Romulan | 30 |
| I.K.S. Koraga (Reprint) | K’vort | Klingon | 30 |
| U.S.S. Enterprise Refit (Reprint) | Constitution | Federation | 31 |
| 4th Division Battleship (Reprint) | Battleship | Jem’Hadar (Dominion) | 31 |
| 5th Wing Patrol Ship (Reprint) | Attackship | Jem’Hadar (Dominion) | 31 |

=== Card Packs ===
Expansion card packs include cards and tokens and are sold individually in transparent plastic packaging with a cardboard backing.

| Faction | Class | Wave |
|---|---|---|
| Cardassian | ATR-4107 | 1 |
| Federation | Oberth | 1 |
| Klingon | Raptor | 1 |
| Romulan | Drone | 1 |
| Borg | Octahedron | 2 |
| Ferengi | D'kora | 2 |
| Gorn | Raider | 3 |
| Jem’Hadar | Attackship | 3 |
| Federation | Attack Squadron | 4 |
| Hirogen | Warship | 4 |

=== Faction Packs ===
Faction Packs resemble the well-known Starter Set in packaging but focus on one Faction within Star Trek: Attack Wing.

| Faction | Title | Wave |
|---|---|---|
| Dominion | NA | 1 |
| Romulan | NA | 1 |
| Ferengi | NA | 2 |
| Independent | A Motley Fleet | 3 |
| Mirror | The Kelvin Timeline | 3 |
| Federation | The Animated Series | 4 |
| Borg | Resistance Is Futile | 4 |
| Dominion | The Cardassian Union | 5 |
| Vulcan | Live Long And Prosper | 5 |
| Federation | To Boldly Go | 6 |
| Klingon | Blood Oath | 6 |
| Federation | Ships Of The Line | 7 |
| Romulan | Secrets Of The Tal Shiar | 7 |
| Federation | Lost In The Delta Quadrant | 8 |
| Federation | Adversaries Of The Delta Quadrant | 8 |
| Federation | These Are The Voyages | 8 |

== Organized Play Events ==
=== Dominion War Storyline ===
Retailers will host game tournaments for players who will compete for dominance of the Alpha Quadrant in a series of Dominion War Storyline OP Events. Each month, players will collect participation prizes and vie for a unique ship.

The player who has the best overall record will be crowned Fleet Admiral and awarded a "Special Grand Prize" Deep Space 9 model at the conclusion of the six monthly events.

=== Other Storylines ===
- The Collective
- Resistance Is Futile
- Q-Continuum
- Temporal Cold War
- Classic Movies
- Klingon Civil War
