= Mage Knight Dungeons =

Board game

Mage Knight Dungeons is a 2002 board game published by WizKids.

== Reception ==
Mage Knight Dungeons was reviewed in the online second volume of Pyramid.

Mage Knight Dungeons won the 2002 Origins Award for Best Graphic Presentation Of A Board Game Product.
