= WizKids =

American tabletop game maker

NECA/WizKids LLC
- Type: Subsidiary
- Industry: Entertainment
- Founded: July 2000; 26 years ago
- Founder: Jordan Weisman
- Headquarters: New Jersey, U.S.
- Area served: Worldwide
- Products: Tabletop and collectible miniatures games
- Brands: Mage Knight; HeroClix; MechWarrior; Pirates; Star Wars; Halo ActionClix; Star Trek
- Parent: Topps (2003–09); NECA (2009-present)
- Website: wizkids.com

NECA/WizKids, LLC (commonly known as simply WizKids) is an American company based in New Jersey that produces tabletop games. WizKids is best known for its collectible miniatures games (CMGs) Mage Knight, HeroClix, MechWarrior, and HorrorClix, all of which make use of the company's Clix system, in which the changing combat statistics and abilities of each figure were indicated by a turnable dial inside the base underneath the figure. The company was founded in 2000 by Jordan Weisman, a veteran of the game company FASA. It was purchased by sports-card manufacturer Topps, Inc. in 2003.

WizKids was acquired by NECA in September 2009.

== History ==
WizKids was founded in 2000 by Jordan Weisman, previously of FASA, to publish Mage Knight. Mage Knight was the first collectible miniatures game. Early employees joining Jordan in this endeavor were his wife Dawne, who led the company's graphic design; his father Mort, who ran international sales; his brother-in-law Ray Wehrs, who ran domestic sales; and Jenny (Trisko) Berg, previously of Bungie, who was in charge of marketing.

In 2001 the company went from being "virtual" to having its own office in Bellevue, Washington. Employees had previously been spread through Washington, Illinois, and Missouri. Mage Knight was selling as fast as it could be made, and the company moved into the hobby's list of 10 largest publishers. The employee count went up to over 30, including Don Gorski, COO; Tom Virgin, CFO; Martin A. Stever, Executive V.P; and Marc Sachnoff, President of WizKids Licensing and Media, who made the innovative deals bringing together the Marvel and DC comics character universes into the HeroClix line.

In June 2003, it was announced that the trading card, collectibles, and confectionary company Topps had acquired WizKids. Topps planned to operate WizKids (which had 95 employees by then) as a separate division.

Though they proved less successful, WizKids also produced the short-lived CMGs Crimson Skies, Shadowrun Duels, and Creepy Freaks, as well as a baseball-themed CMG called MLB SportsClix. A CMG called ToonClix was announced in March 2006, but canceled before it was released.

Former WizKids logo

In July 2004, WizKids created a new product category with the release of their first constructible strategy game (or CSG), Pirates of the Spanish Main, featuring miniature ships assembled from pieces punched out of styrene cards. Their next CSG was a science fiction game called Rocketmen, released in the summer of 2005, followed by a NASCAR CSG called RaceDay later that year, though these last two games were discontinued shortly after. By 2007, WizKids was also calling some of their releases involving CSG elements "PocketModel" games, beginning with the Star Wars PocketModel game.

In 2005, WizKids released their first collectible card game, High Stakes Drifter, which was discontinued after its initial set. In May 2006, they released their second CCG, a licensed game based on the reimagined Battlestar Galactica TV series.

WizKids entered the board game market with a board game called Tsuro in 2005, followed in 2006 by Oshi and Pirates: Quest For Davy Jones' Gold, a board game based on the Pirates constructible strategy game.

The company also owned the rights to the role-playing games Shadowrun and Classic Battletech, which they licensed to FanPro in 2001. A game created by the company called Zypods, with a physical structure similar to Matryoshka dolls, had a limited release, but was never distributed nationwide.

The Topps Company announced on November 10, 2008, that it intended to close WizKids and discontinue product lines including HeroClix. In the statement announcing the close of WizKids, Topps also indicated that it was pursuing alternatives to discontinuing brands so that brands such as HeroClix could continue on without any noticeable disruption in future product offerings.

=== Sale to NECA ===
At the July 2009 San Diego Comic-Con, National Entertainment Collectibles Association (NECA) displayed a Thor figure for Heroclix, indicating that they might be the new parent company for WizKids. On September 14, 2009, NECA announced that they had purchased the assets of WizKids from The Topps Company and will continue the HeroClix family of games under the WizKids brand. The WizKids assets sold did not include Shadowrun and Battletech, which were retained by Topps Inc.

The "Buy It By the Brick" retail promotion returned with the Marvel HeroClix: Hammer of Thor set. Unlike previous offerings, the promotional figure (Ragnarok Surtur) was available with the 10-pack brick purchase at retail locations, rather than through mail-in redemption. With the following set DC HeroClix: Brave and the Bold the promotional figure (a Batman and Catwoman duo-figure) returned to redemption through WizKids/NECA, though this time done online.

=== Storyline Organized Play ===
Beginning with The Infinity Gauntlet in 2012, WizKids began to implement Storyline Organized Play programs. These programs would let gamers go to their local store once a month to play in an event that built up to a grand finale. Players are typically rewarded for attending multiple events before the finale. Storyline Organized Play themes have included No Man's Land for DC, Fear Itself for Marvel, The Dominion War for Star Trek, and others. WizKids continues to implement tweaks to their Storyline Organized Play programs.

== Production ==
WizKids produces both licensed and first-party games. Many of the games WizKids utilize include patented elements like the Combat Dial System. WizKids produces both physical items, like HeroClix, as well as digital transliterations, like Quarriors! for IOS.

== Games and products ==
=== Board Games ===
- Justice League
- Freddy Vs Jason Forest of Fear
- Gremlins
- The Hobbit: An Unexpected Journey
- Mage Knight
- Oshi
- Pirates: Quest For Davy Jones' Gold
- Sidereal Confluence
- Star Trek: Expeditions
- Star Trek: Frontiers
- Star Trek: Fleet Captains
- Star Trek: Into the Unknown
- Star Trek: Captain's Chair
- Trains and Stations
- Tsuro (2004)
- Mage Knight
- Dungeons & Dragons Onslaught
- Dungeons & Dragons Trials of Tempus

=== Books ===
- MechWarrior: Dark Age (novels)
- Mage Knight (novels and collectors' guides)

=== Collectible Card Games ===
- Battlestar Galactica
- High Stakes Drifter

=== Dice Building Games ===
- Quarriors!
- The Lord of the Rings Dice Building Game
- Dice Masters
  - Marvel Dice Masters
    - Avengers vs X-Men
    - Uncanny X-Men
    - Age of Ultron
    - The Amazing Spider-Man
    - Civil War
    - Doctor Strange Team Pack
    - Deadpool
    - Iron Man and War Machine
    - Defenders Team Pack
    - Guardians of the Galaxy
    - Spider-man Maximum Carnage
    - X-Men First Class
    - The Mighty Thor
    - Kree Invasion
    - Avengers Infinity
    - Justice Like Lightning
    - X-Men Forever
    - Uncanny X-Force
  - DC Comics Dice Masters
    - Justice League
    - War of Light
    - World's Finest (originally Superman/Batman)
    - Green Arrow and The Flash
    - Batman
    - Superman and Wonder Woman
    - Harley Quinn Team Pack
  - Yu-Gi-Oh! Dice Masters
    - Series 1
  - Dungeons & Dragons Dice Masters
    - Battle for Faerûn
    - Faerun Under Siege
    - Tomb of Annihilation
    - Trouble in Waterdeep Campaign Box
    - Adventures in Waterdeep Team Pack
    - The Zhentarim Team Pack
  - Teenage Mutant Ninja Turtles
    - Teenage Mutant Ninja Turtles Dice Masters
    - TMNT Dice Masters: Heroes in a Half Shell
  - WWE Dice Masters
    - WWE Dice Masters: Campaign Box
    - WWE Dice Masters: Bitter Rivals Team Pack
    - WWE Dice Masters: Tag Teams Team Pack

=== Collectible miniatures games ===
- Clix games
  - Creepy Freaks
  - Crimson Skies
  - Halo ActionClix
  - HeroClix
    - DC HeroClix
    - Marvel HeroClix
    - Indy HeroClix
      - The BPRD and Hellboy HeroClix
      - City of Heroes HeroClix
      - City of Villains HeroClix
      - Invincible HeroClix
    - Gears of War HeroClix
    - Iron Maiden HeroClix
    - The Lord of the Rings HeroClix
    - Street Fighter HeroClix
    - Star Trek HeroClix
    - Teenage Mutant Ninja Turtles HeroClix
    - Yu-Gi-Oh! HeroClix
  - HorrorClix
  - Mage Knight
    - Mage Knight: Dungeons
  - MechWarrior
    - MechWarrior: Dark Age
    - MechWarrior: Age of Destruction
  - Shadowrun Duels
  - SportsClix
  - Star Trek: Attack Wing
  - MLB SportsClix
- Zypods

=== Constructible Strategy Games ===
- Pirates Constructible Strategy Game
- Rocketmen
- NASCAR Race Day
- The Lord of the Rings CSG (Unreleased)

=== Pocketmodel Games ===
- Star Wars PocketModel Trading Card Game
- Pirates of the Caribbean PocketModels

== Awards ==
=== Board Game Geek ===
- 2012 Golden Geek Best Thematic Game: Mage Knight Board Game

=== Diamond Comic Distributors Gem Award ===
- 2010 Game Product of the Year for DC HeroClix Blackest Night Starter Set

=== Origins Awards ===
- 2010 Best Miniature Figure or Line of Miniature Figures of the Year for Marvel HeroClix Hammer of Thor Expansion
- 2011 Best Miniatures Game Rules of the Year for DC HeroClix Blackest Night Starter Game
- 2013 Best Miniature Figure Line of the Year for Marvel HeroClix: Galactic Guardians
- 2013 Best Family, Party, or Children’s Game of the Year for Quarriors! Dice Building Game
- 2013 Best Miniature Rules of the Year for The Hobbit: An Unexpected Journey – Campaign Starter Set
- 2016 Best Collectible Game for DC Comics Dice Masters: War of Light by Mike Elliot and Eric M. Lang
