= List of collectible miniatures games =

This is a list of collectible miniature games.

- Axis & Allies Miniatures
- Capes & Cowls: Adventures in Wyrd City
- Creepy Freaks
- Crimson Skies
- Doctor Who Microverse
- Dreamblade
- Dungeons & Dragons Miniatures
- Fistful of Aliens
- Gamoja
- HeroClix
- Heroscape
- Horrorclix
- Mage Knight
- Marvel Attacktix
- Battle dice
- Marvel Superhero Showdown
- MechWarrior
- Monsterpocalypse
- Mutant Chronicles CMG
- NASCAR Race Day
- MLB Sportclix
- Pirates Constructible Strategy Game (Pirates of the Spanish Main)
- Pokémon Trading Figure Game
- Racer Knights of Falconus
- Rocketmen
- Shadowrun Duels
- Star Wars Attacktix
- Star Wars Epic Duels
- Star Wars Miniatures
- Transformers Attacktix
- WarChest
- Warheads: Medieval Tales
- WebCardz Ben 10 Alien Force
- World of Warcraft Miniatures
- U.B. Funkeys
- Yu-Gi-Oh! Capsule Monsters Collectible Figure Game

== See also ==
- List of collectible card games
