= Star Wars PocketModel Trading Card Game =

2007 board game

Star Wars PocketModel TCG
Trading Card Game
- Designers: Mike Elliott; Ethan Pasternack
- Publishers: WizKids
- Players: 2
- Setup time: 10 minutes
- Playing time: 30–180 minutes
- Chance: dice rolling
- Age range: 12+
- Skills: Strategy, collecting

Star Wars PocketModel Trading Card Game is an out-of-print tabletop game manufactured by WizKids, Inc. that debuted in 2007, based on the Star Wars universe. The game was designed by Mike Elliott and Ethan Pasternack.

The game has aspects of both miniatures and collectible card game genres. It is similar to WizKid's Pirates Constructible Strategy Game in some aspects, most notably the styrene constructible game pieces, which makes them both PocketModel games. The core gameplay however differs in many fundamental ways, most notably in how movement is handled, and the addition of cards, which adds the strategic element of deck construction which is most often found in CCGs. It derives its content from the first six Star Wars movies and the franchise's Expanded Universe.

The Star Wars PocketModel TCG was announced by WizKids on February 7, 2007, and released in June 2007, after consumers were introduced to the game at Star Wars Celebration IV that May. An expansion to the game, entitled Ground Assault, was released on November 14, 2007. The third 'release', entitled Order 66, was released on March 5, 2008. Several more expansions were slated for release the same year, including Scum and Villainy, Clone Wars, Secret Weapons, and Galaxy at War, as well as a promotional release for the multimedia The Force Unleashed coinciding with the release of the video game; however, only Scum and Villainy and Clone Wars were released before the game was discontinued.

The game was produced until November 10, 2008, when Topps terminated the game company's operations.

In July 2009, National Entertainment Collectors Association, Inc. (NECA) won the bid to purchase the licenses of former WizKids Games products. The rights that NECA bought from Topps to produce PocketModel brand games, however, did not include the rights to the Star Wars franchise. Therefore, WizKids/NECA has no current plans to produce further Star Wars-themed games.

== Rules ==
The game is played out in turns between 2-8 players. Each player has a deck of included trading cards, and a fleet of playing pieces, called units. Each unit has a cost value represented by "build stars". Build stars are often referred to by combat cards, objective cards, and in the rules of the game. Each unit also has four values (Attack, Damage, Defense, and Shields). Units that a player controls in the game are called friendly units. Units that the opponent controls in the game are called opposing units.

A game is played with 30 build stars worth of units, along with a deck of at least 30 cards. The playing field consists of a home zone for each player and one "contested area". Players use units to "strike" objectives (three face-down cards) in their opponent's home zone while defending their own home zone's objectives against opposing units. In order for units to "battle" each other, both players roll 2 6-sided dice and play battle cards (see below). The combatants then add their attack values to their roll. If the attack total meets or exceeds the opponent's defense, a hit is scored. Both players check for a hit simultaneously. If the damage sustained is greater than the shield value, the opposing unit is destroyed. A player loses when either all friendly units in play or all of their objectives are destroyed.

=== Card types ===
There are two types of cards in this game: Combat cards and Objective cards. Combat cards can be played only during a combat action, and they have special effects on the battle. Objective cards mainly can be used only in the home zone of the player that the card belongs to, and grant special bonuses to certain units. With the release of the "Scum and Villainy" expansion, new objectives, called Forward Objectives have special abilities allowing them to be played elsewhere. Objective cards represent essential resources that opponents will seek to destroy.

Although not pertinent to game play, cards are numbered in each set according to rarity, beginning with common cards, then uncommon, followed by rare. Though not any rarer than previous rare cards in a set, the last few cards are printed with foil. These were initially exclusive to combat cards bearing images of prominent characters from the Star Wars universe. With the release of the second expansion of the game (Order 66), however, foil printed objective cards were introduced. Reprints of other rare cards in foil with alternate images were issued for the purpose of being used as tournament prizes. Two versions of the "alternate art" foil cards were printed for prize support. The word "WINNER" appears in silver letters on the bottom-right side of the card designated for the tournament champion. Fellowship winners (runners up) are awarded the alternate art foil missing the "WINNER" label. These foil reprints have the same collector number as the original counterparts from the sets they are from.

Base Set Tournament Foils

- 061 Nien Nunb
- 082 Admiral Ackbar
- 088 C-3PO
- 091 Darth Vader
- 093 Grand Moff Tarkin
- 096 Lando Calrissian
- 099 Mace Windu

Ground Assault Tournament Foils

- 081 Boss Nass
- 083 Chewbacca
- 089 IG-100 MagnaGuard
- 091 Lama Su
- 098 R2-D2
- 099 Rune Haako
- 100 Wampa

Order 66 Tournament Foils

- 39 Mace Windu
- 45 Commander Cody
- 49 Obi-Wan Kenobi
- 50 Order 66

==== Icon types ====
Icons printed on cards are used in conjunction with the icons printed on the bases of playing pieces (ships, vehicles, or creatures referred to as units) in the game. When a unit in a battle has an Icon in common with the combat card played with that unit, it receives the ability from that card. Units with green Match Icons benefit from card abilities with matching green icons. Units with silver Power Match Icons benefit from card abilities with matching silver icons, yet gain other special persistent abilities during game play as well. Gold Wild Icons grant abilities to a variety of units, such as those with a certain number of build stars.

Match Icon (green hexagon) — Card abilities work on units with matching icons on their bases.

- Droid (astromech)
- Laser (target lock)
- Torpedo (proton torpedo)
- Trooper (stormtrooper helmet)
- Leader (4 delta shapes in formation with the lead highlighted)
- Battle droid^{GA} (battle droid head)
- Blaster^{GA} (blaster rifle)
- Transport^{GA} (line of clone troopers)
- Elite^{O66} (two military stripes)
- Airborne^{O66} (Republic gunship)
- Ruthless^{SAV} (Mandalorian helmet)
- Command^{CW}

Wild Icon (yellow/gold triangle) — Unless specified, may be used with any unit.

- Force (lightsaber with wings)
- Luck (dice)

Power Match Icon (grey/silver diamond) — Card abilities work on units with matching icons on their bases, but also grants a persistent special ability.

- Carrier (3 TIE fighters in a hangar, later a runway) — You may use this ability instead of taking an action this turn. If this unit occupies your opponent's home zone, put up to 2 build stars of units from your reserves into your opponent's home zone.
- Turbolaser (white starburst) — +1 damage against or units 4 or 5 build stars.
- Armor^{GA} (black shield) — Reduce damage dealt to this unit by 1.
- Veteran^{SAV} (white heraldic banner w/black star) — If this unit destroys a unit that has the same or more build stars, flip its base and use the values printed there. This unit begins the game with the Veteran icon showing.
- Artillery (plus with arrows pointing inward) May shoot a unit in an adjacent zone. When you do this, the defender can not make a base roll, the attacker may not play a card, and you do one damage for each artillery icon
- Convert^{CW}(two arrows in a circle shape) - Similar to "veteran"; instead of moving, you can upgrade by flipping the base.

^{GA} First introduced in the Ground Assault release.
^{O66} First introduced in the Order 66 release.
^{SAV} First introduced in the Scum and Villainy release.
^{CW} First introduced in the Clone Wars release.

=== Units ===
The playing pieces in the game are made up of different starships, vehicles, and riding creatures from the Star Wars universe. A space unit is identified by the black background on its base, while a ground unit has a base with a beige background. Space units are able to attack other space or ground units in any zone. Ground units only attack other ground units in any zone, but are allowed to attack space units in a home zone, as well as defending against space units in the contested zone.

==== Affiliations ====
A player does not need to use units of the same affiliation, but may mix and match units from different affiliations and eras to build a fleet. Affiliations are identified by their respective logos printed either on the base or the support stem. Affiliations may have significance in a game, due to certain cards targeting specific factions.

- Republic
- Separatist
- Imperial
- Rebel

Alternately, with the release of the "Order 66" expansion, the Jedi Order can be considered to be a faction in of itself with the introduction of combat and objective cards that target units with the word Jedi in the unit's name (i.e. Mace Windu's Jedi Fighter Tank).

Initially, the only unit without an allegiance to any faction is the Episode III variant of the Millennium Falcon unit which was released with a commemorative tin at the Star Wars Celebration IV event. However, with the release of "Scum and Villainy", more units were printed without faction affiliations.

== Sets ==
Each set (the first set - also called the Base Set - and any subsequent expansion sets) is available in foil packs, which have a MSRP of $4.99. Designed to be playable in a mini-version of the game right out of the pack, each pack of the Star Wars PocketModel TCG includes:

- 4-8 PocketModels on two styrene cards (usually one common card, and one uncommon or rare card)
- 6 game cards
- 2 micro dice
- Rules

The full game is played with a fleet of PocketModels of up to 30 "build stars" (a fleet size point limiter with units ranging in point values from 1 to 5), and a deck of 30 cards.

The Base Set and the Ground Assault expansion contain 120 game cards (some of which are printed as foils), and 36 styrene cards of units (larger units filled an entire card, while smaller units fit 2 to 4 on a card). Units available in these packs include ground units with beige bases, and space units with black bases. Silver or gold borders around the bases indicate uncommon and rare trade value respectively, but have no bearing on gameplay. Units without a colored border on its base are common.

Beginning with the third set (or second expansion), Order 66, sets are composed of 60 cards as well as a fewer number of styrene sheet of units.

=== Base Set ===
The Base Set was composed of 83 space-only units of the following types:

- Lambda-class Shuttle
- X-Wing Starfighter
- A-Wing Starfighter
- Droid Starfighter (Vulture Droid)
- Droid Tri-Fighter
- V-Wing Starfighter (Old Republic)
- Rebel Blockade Runner (Corellian Corvette)
- YT-1300 (Light Freighter)
- ETA-2 Interceptor (Jedi Interceptor)
- TIE Fighter
- Darth Vader's TIE Advanced x1 Starfighter
- TIE Interceptor
- ARC-170 Starfighter (Advanced ReConnaissance)
- Geonosian Starfighter
- Nebulon-B Escort Frigate (Rebel Medical Frigate)
- Providence-class Carrier/Destroyer
- Venator-class Star Destroyer
- Y-Wing Starfighter

=== Ground Assault ===
The Ground Assault expansion set was released on November 14, 2007. This expansion includes ground units, such as AT-ATs and Spider Droids, and new rules for the use of ground units. The expansion includes 120 cards and 67 units.

Products for this expansion included the Battle for Hoth Tin (MSRP $19.99), which included a fixed 30 card deck focusing on the Battle of Hoth, and AT-AT, AT-ST, snowspeeder and tauntaun PocketModels. Also, the tin included an exclusive emplacement to be used with an equally exclusive objective card. Each Ground Assault expansion pack (MSRP $4.99) for this release contained 2 styrene cards (4-8 PocketModels), 6 cards, 2 dice and a rules sheet.

The pre-release tournament for Ground Assault was held at GenCon 2007. The expansion was originally scheduled for release in September 2007, but the release date was postponed to November. A promotional playmat poster was made available through mail-in offer with the purchase of five packs from participating retailers.

New gameplay rules and concepts in the Ground Assault expansion include:

- Rules for ground units
- New icons: Battle Droid, Blaster, Transport, and Armor

Unit types include:

- Tauntaun Riders
- Snowspeeder (T-47)
- B-Wing Starfighter
- AT-ST
- Speeder Bikes
- Spider Droid
- TIE Bomber
- TIE Crawler
- AT-AT
- AT-TE
- Imperial Landing Craft (Sentinel-class transport seen in the THX-enhanced Episode IV)
- AAT (Trade Federation Hover Tank)
- C-9979 Trade Federation Landing Craft
- Tank Droid
- AT-AP
- Jedi/Republic Fighter Tank
- Lucrehulk-class Battleship (Trade Federation Droid Control Ship)
- Clone Turbo Tank (HAV/w A6 Juggernaut - Heavy Assault Vehicle/wheeled)
- Acclamator-class Landing Craft

=== Order 66 ===
The Order 66 expansion set was released on March 5, 2008. This expansion includes new ground units and airborne units, such as Republic and Droid Gunships and the AT-OT, and new rules for the use of discard objectives. The expansion includes 60 cards and 18 units, making this the beginning of a series of smaller expansions for 2008.

Products for this expansion included a starter set, Elite Assault Theme Deck (MSRP $19.99), which included a fixed 30 card deck focusing on the events surrounding the time that Supreme Chancellor Palpatine issued Order 66, a set of units which included two prebuilt Jedi Starfighter PocketModels. Each Order 66 expansion pack (MSRP $4.99) contained 2 styrene cards (4-8 PocketModels), 6 cards, 2 dice and a rules sheet.

New gameplay rules and concepts in the Order 66 expansion include:

- Discard Objectives
- Cards with Jedi-specific targeting abilities
- New icons: Elite, Airborne
- Pocketmodel decals

Unit types include:

- ARC-170 Starfighter
- Droid Tri-Fighter
- Droid Gunship (Confederacy HMP - Heavy Missile Platform)
- Jedi Starfighter (Delta-7 Aethersprite-class light interceptor)
- Jedi Interceptor
- Geonosian Fighter
- Swamp Speeder
- BARC Speeder
- Republic Gunship (LAAT/i - Low Altitude Assault Transport/infantry)
- AT-TE
- AT-RT
- AT-OT
- UT-AT
- Acclamator-class Landing Craft

In addition to units found in this collection, an additional oversize unit called a Mega Model was available during April as a prize for one of the tournaments scheduled for that month. It is a reprint of a unit with the same name from the collection (with the same statistics and markings), but printed on a 1/4" styrene sheet. Though a third taller than a 12 fl. oz. (355 mL) aluminum can, the unit is considered competition legal and may be used in games and tournaments.

- 212th Attack Battalion Republic Gunship

=== Scum and Villainy ===
This bounty hunter-themed expansion was released on May 28, 2008. Included with the usual booster pack distribution of this set, a starter set titled Thermal Detonator was released with a fixed 30 card deck and set of units.

New gameplay rules and concepts in the Scum and Villainy expansion include:

- Forward objectives (objectives played in the contested zone)
- Units with alternative statistics on the reverse side of their baseplate
- New icons: Ruthless, Veteran

Unit types include:

- YT-2400
- Slave I Firespray-31
- Imperial II-class Star Destroyer
- Padmé Amidala's J-Type 327 Nubian Starship (rare chrome game piece)
- Jabba the Hutt's Sail Barge
- Bantha-II Cargo Skiff (Sand Skiff)
- T-16 Skyhopper
- Cloud Car (Storm IV Twin-Pod Cloud Car)
- Sandcrawler (Jawa Transport)
- Z-95 Headhunter
- Dewback Riders

In addition to units found in this collection, an additional Mega Model is available during May as a prize for one of the tournaments scheduled for that month. This unit is also considered competition legal and may be used in games and tournaments.

- Slave I Firespray-31 (Jango Fett's ship)

=== Clone Wars ===
This expansion was released on July 26, 2008, to coincide with the Star Wars: The Clone Wars animated theatrical release.

Unit types include:

- Twilight (Starfighter)
- Munificent-class Star Frigate
- General Grievous' Starfighter
- Palpatine's Theta-class Shuttle
- V-19 Torrent Starfighter

== Special Releases ==
=== Demo Pack ===
- X-Wing w/2 TIE Fighters and 2 Cards (Star Wars Celebration IV WizKids Booth. Note: also available in Series 1 booster packs)
- X-Wing w/2 TIE Fighters and 2 Cards (participating stores on launch date only. Note: these had different colors)

=== Star Wars Celebration IV Tin ===
- Millennium Falcon YT-1300 Light Freighter Episode III - Revenge of the Sith variant (called the CIV Falcon by collectors to differentiate it from the Millennium Falcon game piece in the Base Set)

=== Imperial Power-Up Pack ===
- The Imperial Power-up Pack (IPuP) come in three versions, all with exclusive ships and a 30 card Imperial-themed deck.

The units exclusive to the IPuP are:

- Devastator Imperial-class Star Destroyer
- Darth Vader's Lambda-class Shuttle
- Talon Squadron X-wing
- Ebon Squadron TIE Fighter
- Spear Squadron TIE Fighter
- 2 Dice (Red or Black)
- The Target version came with three "No Disintegrations" combat cards, plus a mail-in form for Bull's Eye Squadron ARC-170, Wing 20 Droid Tri-Fighter, Wing 38 Droid Tri-Fighter
- The Walmart and Meijer version came with three "I Am Your Father" combat cards, plus a mail-in form for Razor Squadron ARC-170, Wing 85 Droid Tri-Fighter, Wing 57 Droid Tri-Fighter
- The local game shop (LGS) version came with three "Meditation Chamber" combat cards

The promotional mail-aways are redeemable with three booster pack wrappers - the LGS IPuP has no such coupon.

=== Battle of Hoth Tin ===
This Star Wars 30th Anniversary commemorative tin (abbreviated by collectors as BOH) introduced a new type of playable piece called an emplacement that was deployable with an included exclusive Echo Base objective card.

- 1 Blizzard Force AT-AT
- 2 Blizzard Force AT-ST
- 2 Blizzard Force Speeder Bikes
- 4 Echo Tauntaun Riders
- 4 Rogue Recon Snowspeeders
- 1 Hoth Shield Generator

=== Battle of Hoth Playmat ===
A mail-away coupon for a promotional Battle of Hoth-themed playmat was available on the official WizKids site, or at an LGS upon the purchase of five booster packs, and redeemable when sent in with five wrappers with the corresponding receipts for them. The playmat is divided into zones for use in playing the game, with other areas labeled for placement of cards and game pieces held in reserve.

=== The Force Unleashed Tin ===
Among the PocketModel units that will be available in Lucasfilm's multimedia release, the following are three units exclusive to The Force Unleashed Tin (TFU):

- Rogue Shadow (Juno Eclipse's starfighter)
- Bull Rancor
- Rancor Rider (Felucian on Rancor)

Also introduced with this special release is a cloaking ability not yet elaborated on by WizKids.

=== Turn Actions ===
At the beginning of each players turn they may play one card from their hand to replace an objective card in play. If the objective being replaced is face down it goes into that player's hand, if it was face up it gets discarded. After the player plays an objective card or chooses not to he or she may then take one of the following actions. Once the action is resolved the player's turn is over.

- Strike Action: When a ship or many ships are in an opponent's home zone they may choose to begin a strike. The player that is performing the strike action may choose up to 5 build stars of units in an opposing player's home zone and "strike" one of their objective cards. This action is similar to a combat action except no combat cards can be played and the objective does not return fire. If the attacked objective card is face down first turn it face up. The striking player then rolls two d6's (six sided dice) and adds the result to the attacking unit's attack bonus (including bonuses from revealed objectives). If the result is equal to or higher than the number located at the bottom right of the attacked objective card (plus bonuses from revealed objectives) that objective is destroyed and is discarded. The player whose objective was destroyed gets to take ships equal to the number of build stars of the destroyed objective from their reserve and place them in his or her home zone. If the strike was unsuccessful and the targeted objective was a combat card, then this card is discarded and replaced by a face down card from the top of the defender's deck.
- Move Action: If a player decides to perform a move action they may move any combination of their units totaling up to five build stars from each unit's zone to an adjacent zone.
- Combat Action: When a player decides on a combat action they may choose up to five build stars worth of units to attack with. Each attacking unit can attack any enemy unit that is in the same zone. Only ground units in their home zone can attack space units, but can always return fire when attacked. Once all attacks are declared each battle is one at a time (in order decided by the attacker) using the following steps:

1. Attacking player plays a combat card or passes.
2. Defending player plays a combat card or passes.
3. If the defending player played a combat card but the attacker didn't he/she may decide to play one now.
4. Find your units attack result...

a. Roll 2 d6's and add them up to get the units base roll (if your units base roll is 12 the unit automatically hits, skip to step 7).
b. Add the result to the units attack value.
c. Modify this result using played combat cards or revealed objectives in play that affect this result.
d. This result is your attack result.

5. Find your units defense result by adjusting the units defense score by played combat cards and/or revealed objectives that affect this units defense value.
6. If a unit's attack result is equal to or greater than the opposing units defense result a hit is scored (both players check for a hit at the same time).
7. When a unit is hit assign a number of damage counters equal to the attacking units damage value. When the number of damage counters a unit equals or exceeds its shields value that unit is destroyed and is placed back in the player's reserve area.
8. Any played combat cards are discarded. Players then draw cards until their hand is full (usually 3 cards).
9. Repeat steps 1-8 for every other battle that turn.

== Releases ==
Each release of Star Wars PocketModel TCG includes new units and cards, along with additional features such as new match symbols. The current releases are:

- Base Set - Included only space units, five match icons (Droid, Lasers, Leader, Torpedo, Trooper), two power match icons (Carrier, Turbolaser), and two wild icons (Force, Luck).
- Ground Assault - Introduced ground units, three new match icons (Transport, Blaster, Battle Droid), and one new power match icon (Armor).
- Order 66 - Introduced two new match icons (Airborne, Elite), cards that specifically target Jedi units, discard objectives (objectives that can be discarded to trigger an effect), and PocketModel decals.
- Scum and Villainy - Introduced forward objectives, two new match icons - Ruthless, and Veteran (which changes the stats of units during the game by flipping their bases).
- Clone Wars - Introduced three new icons - Command, Dogfight, and Convert (which changes certain units from space to ground, and changes stats by flipping their bases).
- The Force Unleashed - out already
