= Rocketmen: Axis of Evil =

2008 video game

- Developers: A.C.R.O.N.Y.M. Games; Eyerisk Studios
- Publisher: Capcom
- Platforms: Xbox 360 (XBLA), PlayStation 3 (PSN)
- Release: Xbox 360 (XBLA); March 5, 2008; PlayStation 3 (PSN); March 6, 2008
- Genre: Top-down shooter
- Modes: Single-player, multiplayer

Rocketmen: Axis of Evil is a downloadable top-down shooter created by Canadian indie developers A.C.R.O.N.Y.M. Games and Eyerisk Studios and published by Capcom for the PlayStation 3 and Xbox 360. The game is based on the constructible strategy game called Rocketmen from WizKids. It supports 1-4 person cooperative play either online or offline. The game was originally set for release in November 2007, but was delayed up to March 2008.

Rocketmen: Axis of Evil and its expansion Rocketmen: It Came From Uranus are included in Capcom Digital Collection.

== Story ==
Rocketmen: Axis of Evil's story is based around a possible treaty between the "Legion of Terra and Mars", and the Alliance of Free Planets (Mercury Venus and Earth). The Axis of Evil kidnaps the leader of the alliance, after which the player must explore multiple planets and space stations in order to free her and save the day.

== Gameplay ==
Typical 4 player co-operative gameplay.

In the game, the player can choose from three races including Human, Mercurian, and Venusian as well as three classes including Warrior, Engineer, and Outcast. The player travels through 10 different levels in a linear fashion, the only nonlinear thing being the secondary objectives. The entire object of the game is to go around picking up weapons and shooting the enemies, using the control sticks to move and shoot.

== Character creation ==
The game starts off at the character creation screen. The player first chooses a gender, followed by a race. The color is then chosen, the default being a skintone pigment but ranges from bright pink to black. Throughout the gameplay, each character will gain experience points that can be used after each level to upgrade weapons, skills, and attributes and to raise the drop rate of certain weapons.

== Weapons ==
The thing that separates this game from most shooters is that the weapons are not bullet-limited; they are time-limited. When someone picks up a weapon, that player can shoot it as much as they'd like until the timer runs out. There are a few different weapon-choices. The starting pistol is slow and weak, but it is really only a stand-in until a better weapon is found; the shotgun is the next weapon found, and it utilizes a powerful scatter shot; the Razor fires sawblades which bounce off of walls and wreak havoc; the laser shoots slow bullets that travel through anyone they touch; and the Vulcan fires a quick, double stream of bullets. There are also secondary weapons such as landmines and rockets that allow for additional tactics.

== Reception ==
Reception

Aggregate score
Aggregator	Score	
Aggregator	PS3	Xbox 360
Metacritic	57/100	57/100

Review scores
Publication	Score	
Publication	PS3	Xbox 360
1Up.com	N/A	B
Edge	N/A	4/10
Eurogamer	N/A	3/10
GameSpot	6/10	6/10
GamesRadar+	N/A	3.5/5
GameZone	N/A	5.5/10
Giant Bomb	2/5	2/5
IGN	5.5/10	5.7/10
Official Xbox Magazine (US)	N/A	7.5/10
TeamXbox	N/A	4/10
411Mania	N/A	7/10

The game received "mixed" reviews on both platforms according to the review aggregation website Metacritic. Official Xbox Magazine gave it an early positive review while the game was still in development.

== Rocketmen: It Came From Uranus ==
A followup, Rocketmen: It Came From Uranus also developed by A.C.R.O.N.Y.M. Games and Eyerisk Studios, appeared on the ESRB ratings, rated E10+ as well. A removed post from Capcom's blog stated the expansion would be released on Wednesday, May 14, 2008 for Xbox Live Arcade and Thursday, May 15 for PlayStation Network. The expansion included 3 maps, 3 main weapons, 2 secondary weapons, and new enemies.

== See also ==
- Rocketmen
