= Collectable action figure game =

A collectible action figure game is a collectible tabletop game in which the primary component is some sort of action figure. The first collectible action figure game was Mark Rein-Hagen's Z-G. Subsequent collectible action figure games have included WizKids' Shadowrun Duels, Toy Biz's Marvel Legends Showdown, and Hasbro's XEVOZ and Attacktix games.
