= Dragoneye =

Dragoneye or 'DragonEye may refer to:

- The Dragoneye expansion set for Dungeons & Dragons Miniatures Game
- The DragonEye equipment on the ISS for docking of the SpaceX Dragon capsule
