= Attacktix =

2005 collectible action figure game

- Attacktix logo
- Designers: Hasbro
- Publishers: Hasbro
- Players: 2
- Chance: Some (Attacktix window)
- Skills: Miniatures collecting Aiming; Eye–hand coordination

The Attacktix Battle Figure Game was a collectable action figure game produced by Hasbro, released 2005 through 2006 and featuring characters from the Star Wars, Transformers, and Marvel Comics franchises. Many of the action figures are sold in starter sets in quantities of five or in quantities of three in a booster pack. Most figures average approximately 3.5 inches tall with other larger sized "mega" figures and vehicles. The figures sport a wide variety of spring-loaded action features such as projectile launchers and swinging close combat parts. The goal of the Attacktix game is to physically knock down the opponent's figures. It has also been described as an actionized version of another miniatures game, HeroClix.

== Gameplay ==
Attacktix requires only the collectible figures. Based on a two-player system, each with three main figures, or of an assortment of figures with an equal sum of "point value," the objective of the collectible miniatures game is to be "the player with the last figure standing." Each figure has a certain "tix," or speed, that it can move; on each turn, the player moves his or her Attacktix by moving the base along a surface and hearing a clicking sound. Melee figures can move more tix than ranged figures per turn (8-14 vs. 4-8). Afterwards, the player can then attack with up to two figures, either by swinging a figure with a melee weapon or shooting a figure with a projectile. If a figure is knocked over, it is "defeated" and cannot return to battle.

In a "Master Battle," an advanced game of Attacktix, players can utilise "special powers," which can be conditionally accessed after the figure is defeated. Figures are categorized into classes, which are considered when the aforementioned "special powers" come into play. Some figures' powers deploy or revive figures of the same class, giving players with same-class figures an advantage. Figures are also distinct in base size and projectile size; this variation can be used by players for strategic purpose. Hasbro also released large, powerful miniatures called "Battle Masters," for added intensity. These Battle Masters require a hit at two target spots, rather than knocking the entire figure over.

== History ==
The idea for Attacktix at Hasbro was formed when discussing a combination of trading cards and miniature games into one game. Basic rules were decided upon, such as the abandonment of common miniature gaming aspects like dice or boards, but instead figures and gameplay that required no set-up. Hasbro also wanted a game that was not automatically advantageous to the numerically superior player; every player had a chance regardless of how many figures he or she collected.

The first series of Star Wars Attacktix was released in the summer of 2005 to promote the movie Star Wars: Episode III – Revenge of the Sith. All figures in series one were based on characters from Revenge of the Sith. Series Two was released in the fall of 2005 and featured a mix of characters from the old and new trilogies of Star Wars movies. Series Three was released in January 2006 and focused on the original trilogy. Series Four was released in June 2006 with a smaller roster of 18 figures alongside Transformers Series One.

The starter set for Series One contained one random common battle figure, along with a preset lineup. Also in the starter set was an instructional CD-ROM and a checklist for Series One battle figures. A "Battle Case" was released with Series One and included a limited edition Clone Sergeant along with a new set of rules for the "Capture the Flag" game. Also released in Series One were larger figures called "Battle Masters" which have a greater point value than their smaller counterparts. Series One consisted of the Boga mega figure and an AT-RT. Boga has a "Striking Tail" while the AT-RT fires four small missiles.

Series 2 was released in the fall of 2005 and had two starter sets with each containing one random common battle figure from Series Two along with a preset mix of figures, an instructional CD-ROM for Series Two, and a checklist for Series Two figures. Series Two's mega Republic Gunship figure introduced a special "tether" function in which the Gunship could be detached from the base and 'fly' up to an 8-inch limit from the base. This feature allowed the player to attack distant targets while keeping the base out of range of opponents. This feature also appeared in a later Boba Fett figure.

Series 3's release was in January 2006. This series introduced a new type of attack with the Tusken Warlord's "Prodder" or "Poker" attack. The weapon, similar to a spear, jumps out of the barrel, just far enough to make contact with another figure but never leaves the barrel.

Series 4 saw the figure roster drop to 18 figures and eliminated the Common rarity group of figures while packing 1 of 6 Rare figures and 1 of 12 Super Rare figures in each booster pack. Preview images of a Series 4 starter set showed a set containing Obi-Wan Kenobi, the Tusken Warlord, Luke Skywalker, and Darth Vader. However, the final version included Han Solo, Chewbacca, Boba Fett, and Greedo. Series 4 also had a repainted mega Republic Gunship. Also released was an "Intergalactic Showdown" pack which included the AT-RT mega figure, Luke Skywalker, and Darth Vader alongside Transformers figures Omega Sentinel, Optimus Prime and Megatron with limited edition gold-colored bases.

In 2006, Hasbro added more figures from the entire Star Wars saga as well as Transformers figures. Attacktix figures from both Transformers and Star Wars were sometimes released in the same pack, called an "Intergalactic Showdown Pack."

Marvel Attacktix, featuring a mixture of characters from Marvel Comics, was the final series, released in 2006.

A 5th series of Star Wars and a 2nd series of Marvel and Transformers were planned for release, but Attacktix was cancelled before they could be fully released. Hasbro claimed that the toy line was on "hiatus," and would return in the future.

== Reception ==
The Attacktix collectible series received both positive and negative reception. Joseph Szadkowski of The Washington Times praised the figures and gameplay, stating "the game blends the maneuverability of action figures with the surprises of a collectible-miniatures game."
