= Collectible miniatures game =

Collectible miniatures games (CMGs) are a form of miniatures game that is also similar to collectible card games (CCGs) — the primary difference being that while CCGs are card-based games, CMGs feature miniature figures.

A popular theme for CMGs are strategy wargames, since games of that genre typically feature miniatures such as: soldiers, vehicles, etc. Miniature wargames have been around for a long time, but the idea of a collectible miniature wargame is recent. In a conventional miniature game, players purchase the miniatures they want and generally invest time in assembling, painting, and often customizing the figures to their liking. CMGs were designed to appeal to those who would enjoy the game aspect but not necessarily the hobby aspect of miniature gaming.

CMGs tend to cover a more diverse range of topics than traditional wargames (which generally are fantasy, sci-fi, or historical in theme), and certain games, such as Dreamblade are even somewhat abstract in nature.

Due to the random distribution of figures when purchasing CMG products, a large secondary market has sprung up selling single miniatures, as well as websites that allow players to trade spare figures.

Perhaps the most popular and well-known CMG to date is HeroClix, which allows players to create battles between characters from the Marvel and DC Comics comic book universes, as well as certain smaller publishers. Other popular CMGs include Dungeons & Dragons Miniatures Game, Halo ActionClix, HorrorClix, Monsterpocalypse, Pokémon Trading Figure Game, and Star Wars Miniatures.

== See also ==
- List of collectible miniatures games
- Collectible card game
- Constructible strategy game
