= Z-G =

Collectible action figure game

- Designers: Mark Rein-Hagen
- Publishers: Atomoton
- Players: 2+
- Playing time: Approx 1 hour
- Chance: Some
- Age range: 10+
- Skills: Card playing Arithmetic; Strategy

Z-G (short for Zero Gravity) was the first collectible action figure game, created by Mark Rein-Hagen and released in July 2001 as the first product of his solo company, Atomoton. It uses posable 4.5" action figures with 14 points of articulation and each figure comes with 8 interchangeable accessories in the form of weapons/armour.

== History ==
In an attempt to branch out, Mark Rein-Hagen, creator of the Vampire: The Masquerade role-playing game, founded Atomoton, a company that would focus more on collectible forms of gaming. Its first product was Z-G, which debuted at Gen Con in 2001. A large departure from his previous work, this was a science fiction game featuring cybernetic gladiators. It is based on the setting developed for the unpublished pen and paper RPG Exiles.

Initially, the game was released with three figures (colored red, blue, and green) with their own interchangeable equipment and ability sets. This was quickly followed by "Citizen Z-G", a collectible card set (sold in 10 card randomly inserted booster packs) used to play an expanded version of the game. Planned for future release was a second card set, new accessories for the figures, a nationwide sanctioned tournament league, a companion video game, an animated series, and an accompanying role-playing game.

However, by 2003, the game had been canceled, and Atomoton shut down. Many factors are cited for this failure, but the largest single reason was the loss of its main distributor following 9/11 (a difficult time for the entire tabletop game market). Other reasons include its targeting of children rather than serious collectors, and criticism of the fallibility of the randomizing element in the combat system.

== Gameplay ==
Game play is a combination between a collectible card game and a miniature wargame. The figures (known as "Zigs") move about on a self-constructed battlefield, with their movement and actions determined by a set of cards. Each of the three initial figures came with 10 cards (one for each piece of removable equipment and one for the figure itself), as well as a stat card representing the character inside the suit. Each round, players choose three pieces of equipment out of their deck and use the stats on each to determine turn order, movement, and attack type and strength. The center of the game is the card. Movement of the characters is measured in card lengths and combat is randomized by spinning the cards. Actual attack success or failure was determined by comparing 3 colored dots on the attacking card with a random card from the defender's deck. Two or more matching colors indicate a successful hit and destruction of the equipment shown on the defender's card. The game is lost when a player is reduced to less than 3 cards/parts, or his figure ("ulster") card is destroyed.

The game could also be played in an expanded format using the collectible card set. Here, upgraded forms of the base equipment cards could be found, as well as "maneuver" cards, which could be held in reserve to allow its user to carry out special techniques.

== Reviews ==
- Backstab #35
