= Rocketmen (card game) =

Rocketmen was a constructible strategy game produced by WizKids and released in 2005 and discontinued in 2006. Part of its marketing included animated adventures based on the character of Nick Sion, a rebel and adventurer facing the evil alliance of Terra and Mars.

Announced by Capcom, Rocketmen: Axis of Evil, a downloadable arcade style video game based on the constructible strategy game, was slated to be released Fall 2007 for the PlayStation Network and Xbox Live Arcade.

Rocketmen: Axis of Evil received a Vanguard Unique Game Award at the 2006 Origins Game Fair.

== Description ==
Similar to Wizkids's sailing-themed Pirates of the Spanish Main, Rocketmen is a game featuring spaceships constructed from polystyrene cards purchased in randomly assorted booster packs. Ships can be customized with various crew and equipment configurations, all of which are used to construct a single fleet. A single booster pack can contain enough for a basic game (two ships, a crew card, a resource card, an asteroid card, a die, and a rules booklet), but maximum customizability requires access to a wider collection.

Ship Types include:

- Fighter Squadrons
- Rocketships
- Cruisers
- Space Stations
- Harvesters

Pod Types include:

- Arc Laser (red)
- Shields (blue)
- Tractor beam (purple)

In addition, there are asteroid cards used as a home base during most scenarios. There are also resource chips (called microids) used to construct ships held in reserve in certain games, or as victory points in others.

=== Factions ===
The setting for Rocketmen: Axis of Evil is heavily influenced by movie serial-era space operas.

- Legion of Terra – ruled by a xenophobic totalitarian leader Lord Invictus, the Legion of Terra is a vastly powerful army of disciplined soldiers
- Mars – allied with Terra in the Axis of Evil, the green-skinned Martians have a society entirely based on war
- Venus – part of the Alliance of Free Planets, the blue-skinned Venusians are a people who believe in logic, science, and pacifism and follow a matriarchal society.
- Mercury – part of the Alliance of Free Planets yet traditional enemies of the people of Venus, the golden-skinned Amazon warriors of Mercury are also a matriarchal society, ruled by the Empress Armada.
- Rebels – part of the Alliance of Free Planets, the Terran Rebels fight against their own people in an effort to free Earth

=== Sets ===
- Axis of Evil – Base set.
- Battle of Titans – Released December 2005. This set introduced the factions of Saturn, Io, and Ganymede. It also added the Tractor beam pod type (purple), the Harvester ship and Torpedoes.

== Web Episodes ==
Seven episodes were produced based on the Rocketmen game featuring the protagonist Nick Sion, a member of the Alliance of Free Planets, as they take on the Axis of Evil.

== Reviews ==
- Pyramid
- Syfy
