= Gamoja =

Collectible miniatures game

Gamoja is a collectible miniatures game released in 2006, by Re:Creation Group and created by Genie Toys, in which players collect one of the 46 "Gamoja" character pieces to battle one another. Each of the 45 main characters can be collected in 2 finishes (good twin or bad twin), except for the Ultimoja, which is very rare, and available only in a unique metallic finish.

== Backstory ==
Once every 5000 years, all the planets align, and odd creatures rise from below ground and walk the face of the earth, to fight in a tournament of good against evil. Each Gamoja has a twin, one being good and the other being evil. The good twin Gamoja tend to be more colourful, while the evil twins are often darker. However, Gamoja twins both have the same point value. The age of a Gamoja is also incorporated, and the age, in millions of years, can be found on the foot of a Gamoja.

== Products ==
Gamoja was initially available in three products: a Gamoja Starter Pack, a 5 Gamoja Booster Pack, and a Gamoja Monster Pouch (to store Gamoja). The Starter Pack was bundled with four exclusive Gamoja and an exclusive meteor ball, while the Monster Pouch came bundled with an exclusive Gamoja, Bengara. Each Monster Pouch can hold 20 Gamoja.

Based on the 'twin' theme of the product, initial advertisements included Australian twin actor, turned academic, Jack Dalla Via, along with his evil twin brother.

The 5 Gamoja Booster Pack was also released, costing £4.99, and the 2 Gamoja Booster Pack, costing £1.99.

When a 2 or 5-pack of Gamoja was purchased, an Ultimoja token was sometimes included. The Ultimoja is considered the rarest of all Gamoja as it is shiny, does not have an evil twin unlike every other Gamoja in the series and only 1000 of them have been made.
