= Constructible strategy game =

Type of tabletop strategy game

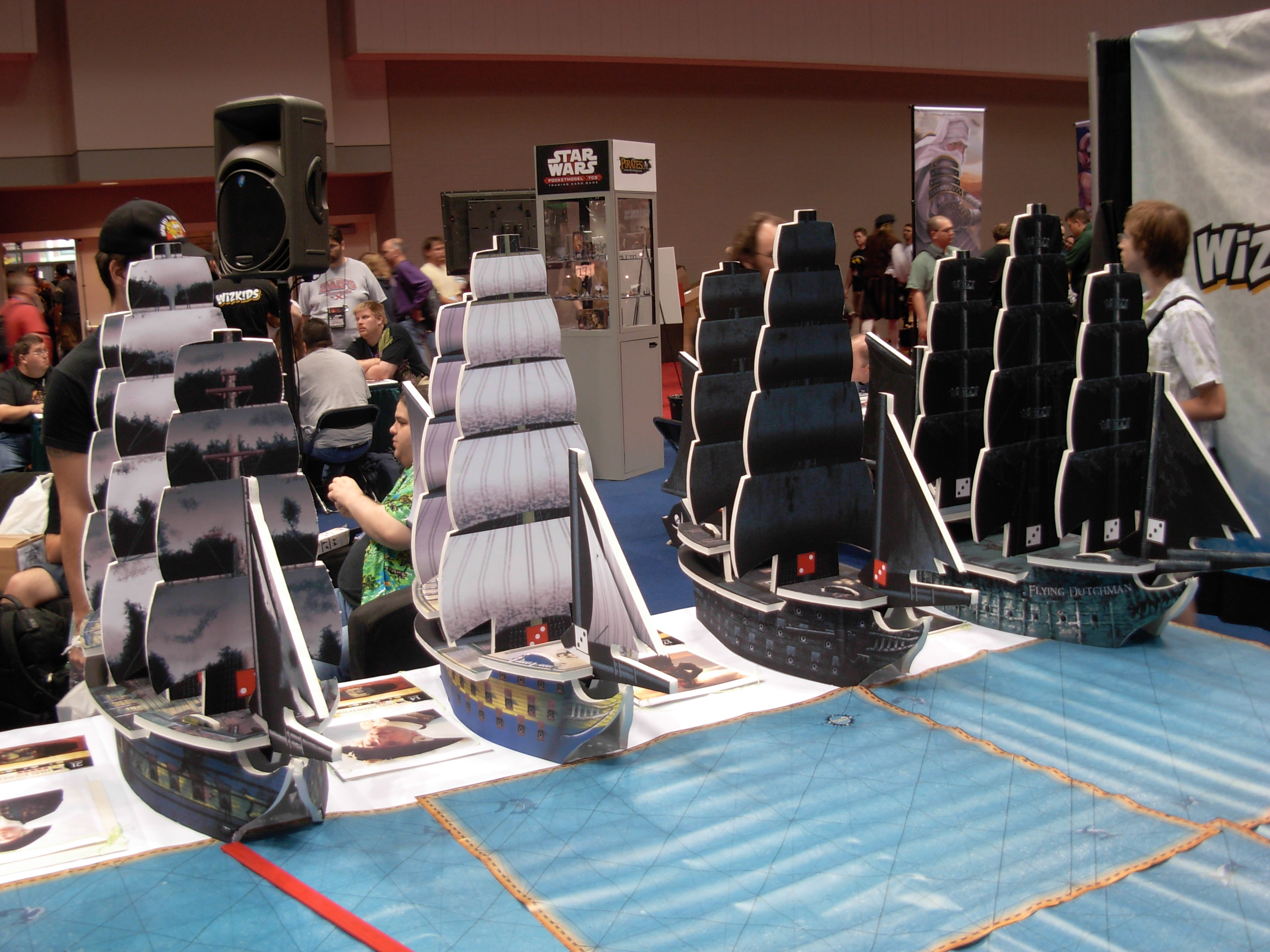
Oversized Pirates models from Pirates Constructible Strategy Game

A constructible strategy game (CSG) (also spelled constructable strategy game) is a tabletop strategy game employing pieces assembled from components.

WizKids was the first to label a game as a CSG when they released their game Pirates of the Spanish Main in 2004. Internally, the term was coined by then-WizKids Communications Director Jason Mical to describe the game where players assemble ships from hulls, masts, and deck pieces punched out of credit card-like plastic (polystyrene). A second CSG from WizKids, Rocketmen, was released in summer 2005, and a NASCAR-themed CSG called Race Day came out later that year. Both Rocketmen and Race Day were later discontinued. WizKids now utilizes the term "PocketModel" to describe this genre, as with Star Wars PocketModel Trading Card Game and the modern Pirates of the Spanish Main website. White Wolf, Inc. released their own CSG, Racer Knights of Falconus, under their Arthaus Publishing imprint in mid-2005.

Wizards of the Coast was awarded U.S. patent 7,201,374 in early 2007 for the constructible strategy game.
