= Monsterpocalypse =

Board game

Monsterpocalypse is a Kaiju-themed collectible miniatures game which is published by Privateer Press. Released series include Rise, I Chomp NY, All Your Base, Monsterpocalypse Now and the current series Big in Japan.

A Voltron-themed set was released in 2010 as a Standalone set.

In 2010, Privateer Press moved from a purely random format to a new system for their new two-player boxed sets. Each set comprising two random factions. With each faction having a fixed set of minis with the only other random element being that tone of the packed monsters from a fixed set of two possible figures. In 2011, Privateer Press released the DMZ series of faction-specific boxed sets with a fixed set of figures in each.

In fall 2018 the game was rebooted with streamlined rules and new, larger figures are sold unpainted to allow players to customize them.

== Gameplay ==
The game is played on one of a variety of maps, which resemble cities. Structures (such as office buildings and oil refineries) are placed on it to build a cityscape. Monsters and other units (represented by miniatures) battle to the death while destroying the structures. The monster is represented by two forms: an Alpha and Hyper form. The goal of the game is to destroy both forms of the enemy monster. This is done by brawling, blasting or making devastating power attacks against the enemy monster. Units can attack a monster as well, but they typically need to work together in order to deal damage. However, the most damage comes from using the monster exclusive power attacks that deal damage by, for example, sending the opposing monster crashing into one or more buildings on the map.

The basic game is played with one monster (its Alpha and Hyper form) against one other monster. The basic rules also allow for double monster battles. The I Chomp NY strategy guide details other possible battle formats.

Gameplay focuses on three parts:

- Tactics – The spawning, moving, and engaging of enemy units and monsters with your own.
- Action dice economy – Using the action dice pool efficiently by using an effective combination of actions, attacks, and movements.
- Power dice economy – Generating and storing enough power to pull off power or other attacks by a monster.

== Factions ==
Monsterpocalypse features several different factions of monsters. As of the 2018 Reboot of the game, each faction belongs to one of two Agendas: Destroyers, who are determined to destroy the planet for their own benefits, and Protectors, who battle to protect the Earth. Players can employ armies consisting of monsters from different factions under the same agenda.

Protectors

- GUARD – Globally United Advanced Research & Defense, is a multi-national defence agency, created to defend Earth against monster attacks, using the latest cutting-edge technology. Its monsters are all giant mech robots, inspired by mecha seen in Japanese anime such as Mazinger and Getter Robo.
- Terrasaurs – The Terrasaurs are a race of giant reptilian creatures, led by the mighty Terra Khan, who have emerged from their hidden home in South America to battle against the creatures who threaten their peace. Its monsters are all gigantic dinosaur-like creatures, inspired by classic Kaiju such as Godzilla and Rodan.
- Shadow Sun Syndicate – The Shadow Sun Syndicate is a shady criminal enterprise based in Japan, who despite their unknown motives, have used their advanced biotechnology and nanotechnology to create giant warriors to defend the earth. Its monsters are all ninja warriors who are able to grow to enormous sizes thanks to their special suits. They are inspired by Ultraman.
- Empire of the Apes – The Empire of the Apes are a race of gigantic apes from a secluded jungle in the Congo. They have great respect for nature, and will battle anyone, monster or human, who dare to threaten it. Its monsters are all giant apes, inspired by King Kong.
- Tritons – The Tritons are an elusive, underwater race, who have been prophesied to rise up from the oceans and join the fight to protect the Earth. Its monsters are all giant sea creatures.
- Elemental Champions – The Elemental Champions are an ancient order of warrior monks, who through years of training and with the use of magic armour, are able to transform into gigantic warriors in order to defend Earth. Its monsters are giant warriors each based on the elements of Earth, Wind, Water and Fire.
- Green Fury – Green Fury is a radical group consisting of scientists and protesters who have devoted themselves to protecting nature by fighting those who would destroy it. Originally they allied themselves with the Terrasaurs, but in the rebooted game, they have become their own faction. Its monsters are beings who were created via powers and resources taken, or recycled, from other factions.
- Draken Armada – The Draken Armada are a race of space faring dragons, who have come to Earth to bolster its defences against threats from outer space. Its monsters are giant dragons, augmented with advanced space armour.
- Legion of Mutates – The Legion of Mutates are a group of athletes and warriors who, thanks to the technology of the Ways and Means Foundation, have transformed into giant warriors to defend humanity. Its monsters are giant anthropomorphic mammalian animals.
- Vegetyrants – The Vegetyrants are a race of ancient, giant plants, who after centuries of hibernation, have awoken to battle their old enemy, the Necroscourge. Its monsters are gigantic sentient plants and trees.
- The First Guardians The First Guardians are an ancient race of Aztec Warriors, who have returned to battle their ancient enemies, The Ancient Ones. Its monsters are creatures and beings based on Aztec Mythology

Destroyers

- Planet Eaters – The Planet Eaters are a race of bizarre, cosmic creatures who have travelled to Earth via a giant comet. Their only aim is to devour everything in their path. Its monsters are all gigantic alien creatures, inspired by giant kaiju seen in tokusatsu series such as Ultraman.
- Lords of Cthul – The Lords of Cthul are evil entities from another dimension, who have been summoned by a sinister cult into our world. Its monsters are Cthulhu-esque creatures, inspired by creatures from the works of H. P. Lovecraft.
- Martian Menace – The Martian Menace is a race of aliens from the planet Mars, who have travelled to Earth to harvest the planet for its resources. Its monsters are alien spaceships and mechanical walkers, inspired by the tripods from The War of the Worlds.
- Savage Swarm – The Savage Swarm is a race of gigantic insects, created due to radiation. Its monsters are giant radioactive insects, inspired by classic monster films from the '50s and '60s.
- Subterran Uprising – The Subterran Uprising is a race of mole-like people who dwell in caverns deep underneath the Earth, and have risen up to the surface to subjugate humanity. Its monsters are giant mole-like creatures, fused with mechanical prosthetics and weapons.
- UberCorp International – Ubercorp International is a consumer products company who have created giant robots ostensibly to protect humanity, but are implied to be prolonging the conflict between monsters in order to sell more of their products. Its monsters are mechanical replicas of monsters from other factions, inspired by MechaGodzilla.
- The Waste – The Waste is a group of slime-like creatures, born from Earth's excessive pollution. Its monsters are giant slime-like creatures, armed with structures and weapons they have absorbed
- Zerkalo Bloc – The Zerkalo Bloc is an army from an alternate universe where the Soviet Union conquered the Earth, and have begun invading other alternate universes to extend their empire. Its monsters are diesel powered giant robots, inspired by robots in Western media such as Robot Jox and Mechwarrior
- The Necroscourge – The Necroscourge is a mysterious space entity, which builds up its forces by devouring dead creatures and reviving them as twisted, undead creations, sent to create more dead bodies to feed on. Its monsters are deceased monsters from other factions, revived and transformed by the Necroscourge.
- Masters of the 8th Dimension – The Masters of the 8th Dimension are interdimensional beings, who have come to Earth to quell the chaos caused by the Monsterpocalypse, by destroying its participants. Its monsters are giant, bizarre interdimensional beings.
- The Ancient Ones - The Ancient Ones are an ancient race of Mayan warriors, led by the evil god Camazotz, who have returned to battle their old enemies, The First Guardians. Its monsters are creatures and beings based on Mayan mythology.

== Game maps ==
Each map to play the game has the following parts:

- Dice wells for unit and monster dice pools, as well as ones for power dice and bonus dice.
- Placement points for buildings that are placed in the order of green then yellow. Placing different buildings in different places can give different strategies. After securing buildings, they unlock different powers and actions that the player can take.
- Monster starting points, which are squares to place monsters in at the start of the game.

Each map also has:

- Power Zones – If captured, they potentially generate power dice for the player.
- Negative Zones – If captured, they make the opposing player lose power dice.
- Spawn Points – Either red for the red player, blue for the blue player, or green for neutral spawns, which must be first captured to be used.

Some maps also contain:

- Speed boost points – A square you don't count if you move on to it.
- Teleporter – A square that you can jump to any other teleporter.
- Ability Zones – Grant units abilities, currently including chain attack, explosion, and demolition.

The "Block War" and "Smashville" game maps are included with the Rise starter set.

This is a list of the currently available maps:

- Block War
- Boardwalk Brawl
- Boulevard of Broken Dreams
- Crossroads Crunch
- Danger Lake
- Downtown Beat-Down
- Grapple in the Garden
- Highway to Hellvue
- Kill-Again's Island
- Killer Canals
- Mean Streets
- Ramming Speed
- Riverside Rampage
- Road to Ruin
- Skull Island
- Smashville
- Waterfront Wreckage
- Wrecking Ball

Maps available in the Voltron expansion:

- Cosmic Influx
- Solar Conflict

== Game aids ==
There are three strategy guides available for the current series: Rise Strategy Guide, I Chomp NY Strategy Guide, and All Your Base Strategy Guide. The books have sections for each Faction: statistics for each monster and unit, tips for using your monster and units effectively, and how to effectively play double-monster battles. Both contain general strategy tips, tips for playing on the various maps, playing in organized play, dice probability tables, a puzzle to solve, a section on the buildings and their use, as well as a glossary of all the game abilities. The guides each come with one double-sided map.

A map pack was also released with the Rise set, including 3 double-sided maps and the Government Building, which can only be obtained with the map pack. The most recent map pack for 'All Your Base' was released with one doubled sided map and one 'Privateer Press Building'.

The All Your Base Strategy Guide hit store shelves a considerable amount of time after the set itself shipped out. According to Privateer Press's Monsterpocalypse page, the late release of the guide was due to "a hold up with the Department of Homeland Defense."

== Dice ==
Official sets of dice include 10 white action dice, 4 blue boost dice, and 10 power dice. These sets come in the various Starter Boxes as well as the Voltron Box Set. They are also sold in accessory kits, which also come with plastic bases that affix to your buildings, monsters, and units in red and blue flavors. These help distinguish each player's figures on the battle map.

Unofficial fan-made dice have also been produced.

== Monsterpocalypse Conventions ==
Team Covenant held a Monsterpocalypse-only convention every year known as MonCon. The first run of the convention, MonCon 2010 was held in Tulsa, OK over a 3-day period and included panels with special guests from Privateer Press, a Monsterpocalypse Masters event as well as others. MonCon has taken place on the following dates:

- MonCon 2010: May 21–23, 2010
- MonCon 2011: May 19–22nd, 2011
- MonCon 2012: June 7–10, 2012

== Comic ==
A four-issue comic book (issues 0 through 3) by Stephan Nilson, Jason Avery, Karl Waller, Rick Bonilla and Marek Oko was published by Desperado Publishing.

== Film adaptations ==
In May 2010, DreamWorks announced that it had acquired the rights to a film adaptation of the game. The studio had approached Tim Burton for the project. On July 19, 2010, it was confirmed that Burton was attached to direct, but the film went unproduced partly due to being similar to another Kaiju film called Pacific Rim, directed by Guillermo del Toro. Some elements were used for another DreamWorks film, Ruby Gillman, Teenage Kraken.

On May 3, 2016, Warner Bros. won the bidding war over film rights of the game, with Fede Álvarez co-writing and directing the film.

== Reviews ==
- Rue Morgue #84
