= Marvel Legends Showdown =

Tabletop game

- Other names: Marvel Superhero Showdow
- Designers: Matt Hyra
- Publishers: Upper Deck; Toy Biz
- Years active: 2005
- Genres: Tabletop game
- Players: 2–12
- Setup time: 2–5'
- Playing time: 30'
- Age range: 10+
- Materials required: Plastic

Related games
- Marvel Legends action figures

Marvel Legends Showdown (initially named Marvel Superhero Showdown) is a collectible tabletop game in which the primary component is action figures and cards. It was a collaboration between Upper Deck Entertainment and Toy Biz (Now known as Marvel Toys).

The game was played on at least a 3×4 grid of "panel cards". Panel cards broke into two categories; "Locations" (places in the Marvel Universe) and "plot twist" (special events that occurred on that space). The goal was to move around the panel card grid and knock out your opponents character with punches, kicks, or shooting them with an included projectile launchers. Once one player did three damage to a character, they were out of the game. The more characters on each side, the larger the panel grid had to be. (2 on 2 a 4×4 grid, 3 on 3 a 5×5 grid, 4 on 4 and 6×6 grid and so on)

It was released in 2005 with two starters and two waves of five boosters each. The set was renamed Legends Showdown to tie it in to the popular Marvel Legends figures. The first two starters and booster sets were re-released with the new name, plus 2 new starters, 3 rider packs, and two new waves of boosters (Though these two waves 3 and 4 had limited release, seen in comic shops and Kay-Bee Toys shelves rarely). Toy Biz changed its name to Marvel Toys and then sold the rights to all Marvel action figure properties to Hasbro. Marvel Legends Showdown was not one of the product lines that transferred over.

The starters included 2 figures, 2 projectile launchers, 3 power cards for each figure, 12 Panel cards, and 2 dice.

Boosters included a figure, a projectile launcher, 3 power cards for that character, 3 power cards for other characters in the wave, and 1 panel card.

All characters had at least 6 power cards, but some may have had up to 10 or 12 (Spider-Man had 3 different figures, starter Spider-Man had cards 1-3, Black Costume Spider-Man from the Booster had cards 4-6, and sometimes had cards found only in the boosters.)

== Checklist ==
=== Figures ===
==== Starter Wave 1 ====
- Spider-Man vs. Thing
- Hulk vs. Wolverine

==== Booster Wave 1 ====
- Berserker Wolverine (chase)
- Black Costume Spider-Man
- Doctor Octopus
- Ghost Rider
- The Punisher

==== Booster Wave 2 ====
- Captain America
- Dr. Doom
- Human Torch
- Iron Man
- Spider-sense Spider-Man (chase)

==== Rider Wave 1 ====
- Ghost Rider on Motorcycle
- Namor on Hammerhead Shark
- Wolverine on Chopper

==== Starter Wave 2 ====
- Magneto vs. Colossus
- Mole Man vs. Mr. Fantastic

==== Booster Wave 3 ====
- Beast
- Elektra
- Green Goblin
- Juggernaut
- Silver Surfer

==== Booster Wave 4 ====
- Cyclops
- Daredevil
- Invisible Woman
- Thor
- Venom

=== Repaints and Variants ===
- Beast's (Note: Standard fur color is blue, but the figure has a grey fur chase variant.)
- Daredevil's (Note: Standard outfit is red, but the figure has a yellow and black chase variant.)
- Elektra's (Note: Standard outfit is red, but the figure has a white costume chase variant.)
- Invisible Woman's (Note: Standard outfit is blue and black, but the figure has a blue and white costume chase variant, as well as a semi-transparent variant.)
- Juggernaut's (Note: Standard face sculpt is in an open-mouth pose, while his variant features a closed mouth along with a different color scheme.)
- Mr. Fantastic's (Note: Standard outfit is blue and white in the starter set, but the figure has a blue and black costume chase variant.)

=== Panel Cards ===
==== Wave 1 ====
Starter Wave 1 and Booster Waves 1 and 2:

- P-01 360 Degree Vision
- P-02 Acrobatic Dodge
- P-03 Armory
- P-04 Asgard
- P-05 Base of Operation
- P-06 Baxter Building
- P-07 Blind Alley
- P-08 Blindsided
- P-09 Burning Mad
- P-10 Cerebro
- P-11 Daily Bugle
- P-12 Danger Room
- P-13 Dark Alley
- P-14 Doc Ock's Lab
- P-15 Earthquake!
- P-16 Find Weakness
- P-17 Flurry of Blows
- P-18 Graveyard
- P-19 Gust of Wind
- P-20 Handy Weapon
- P-21 Huge Target
- P-22 Leg Sweep
- P-23 Medical Attention
- P-24 Mindless Attack
- P-25 Muir Island
- P-26 Mystical Transformation
- P-27 Not So Fast
- P-28 Outnumbered
- P-29 Rejuvenation
- P-30 Revenge Strike
- P-31 Road Block
- P-32 Stop Time
- P-33 Super Punch
- P-34 Teleportation
- P-35 Victory Stance
- P-36 War Room

==== Wave 2 ====
Starter wave 2, Rider sets, Booster Waves 3 and 4:

- P-37 Absent Friends
- P-38 All in Due Time
- P-39 Armed to the Teeth
- P-40 Avalon Space Station
- P-41 Body Blow
- P-42 Boulder Toss
- P-43 Caught Off-Guard
- P-44 Come to Me!
- P-45 Desperate Measures
- P-46 Double Trouble
- P-47 Field Dressing
- P-48 Genosha
- P-49 Hostage Situation
- P-50 Meditation
- P-51 Mega Punch
- P-52 Nerve Center
- P-53 New Fantastic Four Building
- P-54 Parry
- P-55 Phoenix Rising
- P-56 Pride
- P-57 Reed's Underwater Lab
- P-58 S.H.I.E.L.D. Base
- P-59 Sabotage
- P-60 Sanctuary
- P-61 Smash!
- P-62 Strength in Numbers
- P-63 Surge of Power
- P-64 Surprise Attack
- P-65 Knee Strike
- P-66 The Dojo
- P-67 The Maelstrom
- P-68 Uncontrollable Rage
- P-69 Underground Base
- P-70 Underwater Arena
- P-71 Brute Force Attack
- P-72 Weapons Locker

=== Power Cards ===
==== Beast ====
- BST-01 Acrobat
- BST-02 Feral Rage
- BST-03 Super-Leap
- BST-04 Genius
- BST-05 New Perspective
- BST-06 True Blue Friend

==== Captain America ====
- CAP-01 Retrieve
- CAP-02 Ricochet
- CAP-03 Shield Bash
- CAP-04 Leadership
- CAP-05 Shield Defense
- CAP-06 Tactics

==== Colossus ====
- COL-01 Organic Steel
- COL-02 Stand Firm
- COL-03 Strength of Character
- COL-04 Fastball Special
- COL-05 Self-Sacrifice
- COL-06 Transformation

==== Cyclops ====
- CYC-01 Defensive Blast
- CYC-02 Optic Blast
- CYC-03 Surprise Attack
- CYC-04 Leadership
- CYC-05 Overload
- CYC-06 Revenge

==== Daredevil ====
- DAD-01 Baton Strike
- DAD-02 Heightened Senses
- DAD-03 Sonar
- DAD-04 Amazing Agility
- DAD-05 Man Without Fear
- DAD-06 Swing Line
- DAD-07 Blind Luck

==== Doc Ock ====
- DOK-01 Dangerous Experiment
- DOK-02 Tentacles of Fury
- DOK-03 What are the Odds?
- DOK-04 Easy Eight
- DOK-05 Four-way Attack
- DOK-06 Idle Hands

==== Dr. Doom ====
- DRD-01 Plan B
- DRD-02 The Power Cosmic
- DRD-03 Reign of Terror
- DRD-04 Decoy Program
- DRD-05 Mystical Confusion
- DRD-06 Mystical Fog

==== Elektra ====
- ELK-01 Crossed Blades
- ELK-02 Double Sai Strike
- ELK-03 Waiting in Ambush
- ELK-04 Concentration
- ELK-05 Mystical Training
- ELK-06 Group Tactics
- ELK-07 Contract
- ELK-08 Counterstrike

==== Ghost Rider ====
- GHR-01 Chain Attack
- GHR-02 Relentless Assault
- GHR-03 Revenge
- GHR-04 Burn Rubber
- GHR-05 Penance Stare
- GHR-06 Vengeance
- GHR-07 Burning Mad
- GHR-08 Road Warrior
- GHR-09 Spirit of Vengeance
- GHR-10 (Unconfirmed)

==== Green Goblin ====
- GRG-01 Strike From Above
- GRG-02 Flight
- GRG-03 Pumpkin Bomb
- GRG-04 Hostile Takeover
- GRG-05 Inner Struggle
- GRG-06 Paranoia

==== Hulk ====
- HLK-01 Crushing Blow
- HLK-02 Getting Angry
- HLK-03 Super-Leap
- HLK-04 Hulking Out
- HLK-05 Hulk Smash!
- HLK-06 Rush of Adrenaline

==== Human Torch ====
- HMT-01 Flight
- HMT-02 Heat Wave
- HMT-03 Nova Flame
- HMT-04 Cosmic Radiation
- HMT-05 Flaming Aura
- HMT-06 Nova Burst

==== Invisible Woman ====
- IVW-01 Force Bubble
- IVW-02 Flight
- IVW-03 Enraged
- IVW-04 Stealth Strike
- IVW-05 Force Field
- IVW-06 Invisibility
- IVW-07 Shockwave
- IVW-08 Psionic Blast

==== Iron Man ====
- IRM-01 Focused Blast
- IRM-02 Jet Boots
- IRM-03 Power Strike
- IRM-04 Recharge
- IRM-05 Energy Shield
- IRM-06 Wide Beam

==== Juggernaut ====
- JUG-01 Flying Tackle
- JUG-02 Mystical Energy
- JUG-03 Smash!
- JUG-04 Appetite for Destruction
- JUG-05 Steamroller
- JUG-06 Unmasked
- JUG-07 Invasion
- JUG-08 Reckless Charge

==== Magneto ====
- MAG-01 Flight
- MAG-02 Magnetic Personality
- MAG-03 Magnetic Force
- MAG-04 Entangle
- MAG-05 Leadership
- MAG-06 Twisted Metal

==== Mole Man ====
- MOM-01 Bojutsu Strike
- MOM-02 Burrowing
- MOM-03 High Ground
- MOM-04 Sewer Surprise
- MOM-05 Sinkhole
- MOM-06 Summon Monster

==== Mr. Fantastic ====
- MRF-01 Brilliant Mind
- MRF-02 Framistat
- MRF-03 Stretch Attack
- MRF-04 Far-Reaching Plans
- MRF-05 Long-Range Grab
- MRF-06 Twisted Dodge

==== Namor ====
- NAM-01 Flight
- NAM-02 Force of Will
- NAM-03 Shark
- NAM-04 (Unconfirmed)
- NAM-05 (Unconfirmed)
- NAM-06 (Unconfirmed)

==== Punisher ====
- PUN-01 Extra Ammo (Note: Each of your figured gets +2 ATK this round and may reload his weapon.)
- PUN-02 Outgunned (Note: Punisher gets +2 DEF this round, make a ranged attack. Unload the defenders weapon.)
- PUN-03 Punishment (Note: Punisher gets +4 ATK this round. Use this power only if Punisher was hit this round.)
- PUN-04 Cover Fire
- PUN-05 Dual Sidearms
- PUN-06 Fully Loaded

==== Silver Surfer ====
- SIS-01 High-Speed Turn
- SIS-02 The Power Cosmic
- SIS-03 Surf's Up
- SIS-04 Cosmic Awareness
- SIS-05 Molecular Control
- SIS-06 Tireless Warrior

==== Spider-Man ====
- SPM-01 Spider Strength
- SPM-02 Web Shooter
- SPM-03 Web Slinging
- SPM-04 Alien Symbiote
- SPM-05 Come To Me!
- SPM-06 Spider Reflexes
- SPM-07 Sticky Situation
- SPM-08 Altered Genetics
- SPM-09 Spider Senses
- SPM-10 Wall Crawling

==== Thing ====
- THG-01 Batter Up!
- THG-02 It's Clobberin' Time!
- THG-03 One-Two Punch
- THG-04 Charge!
- THG-05 Rock Solid
- THG-06 Stomp!

==== Thor ====
- THR-01 Divine Protector
- THR-02 Hammer Time
- THR-03 Mjolnir
- THR-04 Flight
- THR-05 God of Thunder
- THR-06 Retrieve

==== Venom ====
- VNM-01 Keen Senses
- VNM-02 Rage
- VNM-03 Web Slinging
- VNM-04 Fear
- VNM-05 The Symbiote
- VNM-06 Tongue Lashing

==== Wolverine ====
- WLV-01 Combat Reflexes
- WLV-02 Healing Factor
- WLV-03 Snikt!
- WLV-04 Berserker Rage
- WLV-05 Deep Wound
- WLV-06 Nasty Surprise
- WLV-07 Heightened Senses
- WLV-08 Intense Training
- WLV-09 Chopper
- WLV-10 In One Swing
- WLV-11 Shrug It Off
- WLV-12 (Unconfirmed)
