= Star Wars Miniatures =

Star Wars tabletop miniatures game

- Figures from the Star Wars Miniatures game
- Publishers: Wizards of the Coast
- Years active: 2004–2010
- Players: 2 and up
- Setup time: < 10 minutes
- Playing time: appr. 45 minutes to 1 1/2 hours
- Chance: Medium-High
- Age range: 12 and up
- Skills: Strategy, Planning

Star Wars Miniatures is a 34mm scale collectible miniatures tabletop game based on the Star Wars fictional universe that was produced by Wizards of the Coast. The game was originally released in September 2004 and continued production until May 2010. Star Wars Miniatures players build point-based squads from one of ten different in-universe factions then conduct battles between those squads. The game mechanics are a simplified version of the d20 roleplaying game system. Multiple maps, scenarios, and set themes from different settings and time periods from within the Star Wars universe are available.

== History ==
Star Wars Miniatures premiered on September 3, 2004. The first set, "Rebel Storm," was released at that time and was followed up by "Clone Strike," which came out December 4, 2004. April 9, 2005 brought the third set release, titled "Revenge of the Sith", with the "Universe" expansion set in August that, hitting stores on August 27 that year. Later "Champions of the Force" was released on June 10, 2006. The "Bounty Hunters" set was released in September 2006, followed by "Starships Battles" in November. The special 30th anniversary set, "Alliance and Empire," was released May 2007. "Force Unleashed" set has been released in November 2007. "Legacy of the Force" was released on March 28, 2008. "Knights of the Old Republic" was released in Summer 2008, followed by "Clone Wars" in the late Fall of that year. Early 2009 included "Imperial Entanglements" which was followed in June by "Jedi Academy". "Galaxy at War" in October rounded out the 2009 collection, with "Dark Times" to follow in January/February 2010. The final official set released by Wizards of the Coast was "Masters of the Force", released April 2010. The sets released from "Rebel Storm" to "Knights of the Old Republic" have featured 60 fully constructed and fully painted miniature figures from different eras and settings of the Star Wars timeline. From "Clone Wars" onward, sets feature a total of 40 pieces.

Accompanying the first three sets was a scenario book called Ultimate Missions. Each book contained a double-sided map and a series of scenarios. Ultimate Missions: Rebel Storm included scenarios drawn from A New Hope, The Empire Strikes Back and Return of the Jedi, along with the associated radio dramas. Ultimate Missions: Clone Strike drew its scenarios from Star Wars: Episode I – The Phantom Menace, Attack of the Clones, and Star Wars: Clone Wars. Ultimate Missions: Revenge of the Sith covered Star Wars: Episode III – Revenge of the Sith. The Ultimate Missions series was discontinued after Revenge of the Sith in favor of scenario packs such as Attack on Endor.

On November 11, 2005, a special "AT-AT Imperial Walker Colossal Pack" was released, which came with the AT-AT. The AT-AT is scaled correctly to the other miniatures, and stands at fourteen inches high and eighteen inches long.

In February 2006, the "Attack on Endor" set was released. This set consists of an AT-ST (All Terrain Scout Transport), an Imperial Stormtrooper, Imperial Stormtrooper Officer and an Imperial Stormtrooper Scout. Also included are two double-sided maps and a scenario book. No Ewoks are included.

On January 28, 2010, an official announcement on the Wizards of the Coast forum stated that Wizards of the Coast would not renew the license for Star Wars Miniatures.

== Gameplay ==
In Star Wars Miniatures, ten different factions are available for play. They are Rebel, Imperial, Republic, Separatist, New Republic, Yuuzhan Vong, Old Republic, Sith, Mandalorian, and Fringe. Each game requires that each player chooses one of the above factions to play as and then builds a squad using miniatures from that faction. The only exception is Fringe, which is a "neutral" faction, whose figures can be used in any squad. Players agree on a point total (100, 150, and 200 being the official standards) and create a squad that does not exceed the chosen point total for one of the following formats:

- Free-for-all: Each player makes a single faction(possibly including Fringe) squad for the battle. Factions may battle factions of different eras or even the same faction. This is the format used for sanctioned tournaments.
- Era Play: Players select an era then choose one player to play a light side faction and one to play a dark side faction from that era. Fringe characters may mix with either player's squad. The eras are:
  - Old Republic: Old Republic vs. Sith (or Mandalorian)
  - Rise of the Empire: Republic vs. Separatist (or Imperial).
  - Galactic Civil War: Rebel vs. Imperial.
  - New Republic: New Republic vs. Imperial.
  - New Jedi Order: New Republic (or Imperial) vs. Yuuzhan Vong.
- Light Side vs. Dark Side: Players make a multi-faction squad with one player representing the light side (Old Republic, Republic, Rebel Alliance, & New Republic) and the other representing the dark side (Sith, Mandalorians, Separatists, Imperials, & Yuuzhan Vong) Fringe may belong to either side.
- No Faction: Players make a squad using any combination of characters.
- Sealed: Players open a predetermined amount of Starters and Boosters and make a No Faction squad with the miniatures contained inside.
- Draft: 4 or more Players each open one of three booster boxes at a time, select one miniature inside and pass the box to the next player. The Players then make a squad out of only the miniatures they draft in this way. This can be played No Faction or Factions, if multiple players have the same Faction, they are termed as No Faction for play.

After players agree on a point total and play format and build their squads, one of several play maps representing different locations of the Star Wars Universe is chosen and set up. The maps feature a one-inch square grid overlay that indicates where characters can move, as well as being used to determine range and the ability to see a target. Different maps influence the game in different ways. For instance, the map included in the "Revenge of the Sith Starter" represents the interior of a battered starship, with small hallways and rubble-filled rooms, but is considered the only "huge-friendly" map as it is the only one where a huge character can travel from one starting area to the other. Some of the official maps are:

- Death Star (Rebel Storm Starter)
- Tatooine: Mos Eisley (Updated League Prize ONLY, Ultimate Missions: Rebel Storm version NOT tournament legal)
- Cloud City (Updated League Prize ONLY, Ultimate Missions: Rebel Storm version NOT tournament legal)
- Muunilinst (Clone Strike Starter)
- Coruscant: Undercity Streets (Ultimate Missions: Clone Strike)
- Geonosis: Arena Pit (Ultimate Missions: Clone Strike)
- Starship (Revenge of the Sith Starter)
- Invisible Hand (General Grievous's flagship)/Imperial Base (Ultimate Missions: Revenge of the Sith) (New Starter Set)
- Mustafar (Ultimate Missions: Revenge of the Sith)
- Hoth: Plains (AT-AT Colossal Pack)
- Hoth: Shield Generator (AT-AT Colossal Pack)
- Forest Moon of Endor: (Attack on Endor)
- Yavin 4: Jedi Praxeum (Attack on Endor)
- Rancor Cave (Attack on Endor)
- Ruined Base (Attack on Endor)
- Korriban: Valley of the Dark Lords (Wizards League Kit) (New Starter Set)
- Hoth: Echo Base Outpost (Battle of Hoth)
- Hoth: Echo Base Outskirts (Battle of Hoth)
- Ossus: The Great Jedi Library (reverse side of the promotional Legacy of the Force gallery poster)

The objective of the game can vary, but in standard play the winner is the player who earns a number of victory points equal to or greater than the Squad limit or the player with the most victory points when a tiebreaker is called (no characters have made offensive actions in 10 rounds). Players score victory points equal to the cost of characters they defeat. In a variant designed to discourage players from hiding, known as Gambit format, players also score 5 victory points at the end of every round in which they have a character within 4 squares of the center. Gambit format is the format used in sanctioned tournaments.

=== Combat ===
Combat in the game is similar to other tabletop games. A 20-sided die (or D20) is used to determine if an attack succeeds and is also used for various other checks throughout the game. In the case of an attack, the D20 is rolled and its final value is modified by the attacker's bonus and other circumstances of the attack (e.g. a target in cover). If the total is greater than or equal to a figure's defense, that figure takes damage. When a figure has taken damage equal to its hit points, that figure is defeated and removed from play.

== Distinguishing features ==
Star Wars Miniatures has several unique differences that separate it from most other tabletop games. There are "Force Powers", which are used by Jedi, Sith and other Force users and can devastate lesser figures. These also have Force ratings, which allow them to make re-rolls to failed attacks or defends and also to use their Force powers. There are also "Commander Effects", possessed by the various leaders in the Star Wars universe (Darth Vader, General Veers, Padmé Amidala - among others). Commander Effects confer bonuses, enhancements or other special abilities to their allies on the battlefield, although a few commander effects have negative results. Characters also come in different sizes with Small and Medium characters taking up 1 square, Large 4 (2 by 2), Huge 9 (3 by 3), and Colossal (anything bigger than 3 by 3; the biggest so far is the AT-AT, which takes up 6 by 12 squares).

== Set themes ==
Each of the released sets focuses on different aspects of the Star Wars history, and some sets may be more desirable than others based on this fact.

Rebel Storm
Released September 3, 2004. Being the premiere set of the game, Rebel Storm focused on the struggle between the Rebels and the Imperials throughout the classic Star Wars trilogy. Only characters from the three original movies (A New Hope, The Empire Strikes Back, and Return of the Jedi) were included.
Clone Strike
Released December 4, 2004. Clone Strike represented the struggle between the Republic and the Separatists at the dawn of the Clone Wars consisting of figures from The Phantom Menace and Attack of the Clones films as well as figures from the Clone Wars Animated Micro Series. Clone Strike was the first set to be taken out of print, and many of its pieces are especially sought after for that reason.
Revenge of the Sith
Released April 2005. Revenge of the Sith was based on the movie of the same name. Characters from the then-final movie in the Star Wars saga were introduced in this set, with the exception of the young Boba Fett, who only appeared in Attack of the Clones.
Universe
Released August 19, 2005. Universe is a set that spans the entire Star Wars chronology, ranging from Star Wars: Episode I – The Phantom Menace to the invasion of the Yuuzhan Vong. This is the first set to feature a substantial number of individuals from the Star Wars expanded universe as well as Huge figures (particularly large figures that take up a 3-inch square area on a map).
Attack on Endor
Attack on Endor reprinted figures (Stormtrooper Officer, Stormtrooper and Scout Trooper) as well as the AT-ST (which is also in the Universe set) from older sets that were present during the Battle of Endor.
Champions of the Force
Released June 2006. Champions of the Force introduced the Old Republic and Sith factions, and mainly takes place during the Great Hyperspace War and Sith War of the Star Wars timeline but overall covers all eras of the Star Wars Universe. Includes figures like Luke Skywalker and Exar Kun as well as Dark Jedi.
Bounty Hunters
Released September 2006. Bounty Hunters has a focus on the Fringe faction for the most part featuring the underworld of gangsters, bounty hunters, mercenaries, and a new faction the Mandalorians plus some Separatists and Rebels, with less emphasis on Star Wars expanded universe figures. The Republic and Empire each receive a token figure. It includes 11 huge figures, rather than the 10 included in "Universe".
Starship Battles
Released November 2006. This is the name for the stand-alone space combat game released in November 2006. This game is centered on starship combat. Players control starships (fighters and capital ships) rather than individual characters. The Starter set (MSRP (manufacturer's suggested retail price) $39.99) includes the Executor Class Star Dreadnought Executor (from the Galactic Civil War Era) and the Mon Calamari Star Defender Viscount (from the New Jedi Order Era) along with eight randomized ships. The boosters (MSRP $21.99) contain 7 randomized ships from all eras. There are 60 different ships to collect. In this new expansion, different rules apply. Squads are divided into a Dark or Light side faction, and recommended squad size in a free-for-all is about 300 points. There are ships and fighters from all six movies. This stand-alone combat system received no further support from Wizards of the Coast, and is out of print.
Alliance and Empire
Released May 2007. This set celebrates the 30th anniversary of the Star Wars saga with a collection of miniatures inspired by the original Star Wars film. Figures are drawn from the landmark films to the computer games and the novels. The set pits the Rebellion against the Empire in battles to decide the fate of the galaxy. The 60 miniatures in this anniversary edition have square bases to commemorate the 30th anniversary. Each miniature's base has the Star Wars logo on the front.
Rebels and Imperials
This set constitutes a re-release of selected minis from previous sets, focusing on characters from the original trilogy. The set consists of 24 miniatures, and was released in packages of two figures each.
Force Unleashed
Released November 16, 2007. The set contains figures that are based on Star Wars: The Force Unleashed videogame and the Battle of Hoth.
Battle of Hoth Scenario Pack
A Target exclusive starter set in the U.S., bundled with a bonus Bounty Hunters pack, (Available in Canada non-exclusive, but without the bonus pack) it featured 16 various figures from the Battle of Hoth in Episode V, plus one exclusive General Veers holo figure, and at AT-ST with winter camouflage.
Legacy of the Force
Released March 28, 2008. This set includes figures from the Hyperspace War to the Legacy era. The majority of figures are drawn from the Legacy comics or the Legacy of the Force novels, though a few are also drawn from the Tales of the Jedi and Rebellion comics.
Knights of the Old Republic
Released August 19, 2008. This set mainly includes figures from the Old Republic era, including iconic figures from the Star Wars: Knights of the Old Republic and Star Wars: Knights of the Old Republic II: The Sith Lords video games and the Star Wars: Knights of the Old Republic comics. Republic characters from the prequel trilogy (with focus on the Gungan race) also made an appearance, along with a few of the major characters from the Classic Trilogy.
Clone Wars Battles Scenario Pack
Released October 18, 2008. A Target exclusive set in the U.S., featured 10 figures (5 exclusive miniatures) from the Clone Wars era.
The Clone Wars
Released October 31, 2008. This set includes figures from the animated TV series of the same name. This and subsequent sets will contain 40 miniatures rather than the customary 60 figure count from previous sets.
Imperial Entanglements
Released March 17, 2009, this set consists of 40 figures from the Original Trilogy era, including figures from Star Wars: Shadows of the Empire.
Jedi Academy
Released June 30, 2009, this set consists of 40 figures from the Original Trilogy era, the Prequel Trilogy era, and the Expanded universe and is centered on force users, with every Rare and Very Rare character being a Jedi or Sith. It includes sith figures like Darth Plagueis and Darth Sidious.
Galaxy at War
Released October 23, 2009, this set consists of 40 figures from the aforementioned animated TV series. Rounding out season 1, it includes many incarnations of the heroes of the Republic along with an emphasis on Separatist commander characters.
Dark Times
Released January 26, 2010, this set consists of 40 figures. Bounty hunters are a theme and the set contains several characters from the Dark Times comic series.
Masters of the Force
Released April 6, 2010, this set consists of 40 figures; Jedi masters are a major theme including the force spirits of Anakin Skywalker and Yoda. A unique feature of this set includes representations of the monsters used in the iconic Dejarik ("holochess") game played by R2-D2 and Chewbacca in Star Wars Episode 4: A New Hope.

== Collectability ==
The game includes miniatures printed at four different levels of rarity: "common", "uncommon", "rare", and "Very Rare". Each of the first three sets were packaged in individual booster packs of miniatures, which in turn came with 7 random miniatures (1 rare or very rare, 2 uncommon, and 4 common). On average, one in three booster packs included a Very Rare instead of a normal Rare.

Popular characters from the movies are typically Rare, while less well known characters from other sources and the most powerful movie characters are Very Rare. As Rare characters are more often found than Very Rares in the randomized booster packs, the more recognizable characters are more increasingly often made Rare in order to maximize the appeal of the product. In the recent Galaxy at War set, characters such as Obi-Wan Kenobi, Anakin Skywalker and General Grievous appeared as Rares while secondary characters such as Hondo Ohnaka, Mar Tuuk and Wat Tambor fell into the Very Rare position. An increased cost to produce a figure will increase its rarity.

In the Universe set, special Huge miniatures were introduced, with a "footprint" nine times that of a typical figure. Each booster pack came with 1 rare, 1 huge figure (of random rarity), 2 uncommons, and 3 commons. This was the first set in which it was possible to get 2 rares in the same pack.

Other products include starter boxes which are prepackaged to include certain figures. The "Rebel Storm Starter Game" comes with Luke Skywalker, Rebel and Darth Vader, Dark Jedi, along with a randomized assortment of figures. The "Clone Strike Starter Game" comes with Jango Fett and General Kenobi and a number of randomized figures. The "Revenge of the Sith Starter Game" comes with General Grievous, Supreme Commander and Obi-Wan Kenobi, Jedi Master, as well as two Clone Troopers and two Super Battle Droids. A new starter set consisting of reprints contains Obi-Wan Kenobi (Rebel Storm), Darth Vader (Revenge of the Sith), Rebel captain, Rebel Heavy Trooper, Elite Stormtrooper, Heavy Stormtrooper and a Korriban and Trade federation cruiser map. The "Attack on Endor" Scenario Pack comes with an AT-ST, a Stormtrooper Officer, Stormtrooper and Stormtrooper Scout.

The figures of Aurra Sing and a Stormtrooper from the 2005 "Star Wars Unleashed" line of plastic-sculptured statuettes each came with a bonus miniature "Twi'lek Bodyguard" for the Wizards of the Coast game; the same miniature came with both figures. The miniature is designated on the bottom of its stand as from the set "Unleashed" (as distinct from miniatures from the later "The Force Unleashed" set), but is otherwise identical to the same miniature from the "Rebel Storm" set released in 2004 (the same date printed on the bottom of the stand for the bonus miniature). It is the only known miniature in the "Unleashed" set, and also the only known cross-promotional miniature in the entire Wizards miniatures 2004-2010 line.

== Reviews ==
- Syfy

== See also ==
- Dungeons & Dragons Miniatures Game, a miniatures game with similar rules also produced by Wizards of the Coast.
