= NASCAR Race Day =

Tabletop game

- Players: 2–12
- Setup time: 10 minutes
- Playing time: 30–180 minutes
- Chance: Considerable
- Age range: 7 and up
- Skills: Strategy, Dice rolling, Collecting

NASCAR Race Day is a tabletop game with aspects of both miniatures and collectible card genres. The creators of the game, WizKids, dubbed it a "Constructible Racing Game".

== Description ==
The goal of NASCAR Race Day is identical to that of an actual NASCAR race; "go fast, turn left, don't crash." Players construct cars by popping out small pieces of styrene and assembling them into the likeness of NASCAR racing machines. The game is packaged so that a person may play the game with only one game pack, but more packs add more vehicles and more tracks to the mix, making a larger set more desirable.

== Cancellation ==
WizKids announced in mid-2006 that they were discontinuing support for Race Day and cancelling an upcoming expansion. Primary factors listed for the decision were a lack of support from NASCAR itself, and weak support from rank-and-file NASCAR fans, who were not interested in the "blind draw" style of obtaining drivers; rather, they wished simply to purchase their favorite driver outright, and had no interest playing as anyone else.[The majority of this information comes from the official WizKids Race Day forum, which requires user registration.]

As of February 2007, WizKids have closed the official Race Day forum and removed all references to the game from their website.

== Pack Contents ==
Each pack of the Race Day game includes two cars. These cars may be Common, Uncommon, or Rare. Generally speaking, packs include one Common and either an Uncommon or a Rare. Also included are a short track (with part of a super-speedway printed on the reverse), an accessory card, a set of rules, and a minuscule die.

Three box sets were also sold. These consisted of one promotional card, four regular cards (with no pre-determined mix of Common/Uncommon/Rare), accessory cards, a large, full-color map of a "famous" track, and a single large die.

- Pack Ratio Retail Box (approx) - 2:3 for a Common Card, 1:1 for an Uncommon Card, and 1:3 for a Rare Card
- Approx Net from 36 pack Retail Box - 1 Complete 28 Car Set + 24 Extra Uncommon Cards + 20 Extra Common Cards

== Sets ==
=== First Release ===
NASCAR Race Day 2005 was released mid-2005. The set included:

- 30 different cards featuring 23 drivers:
  - Four common cars: Tony Stewart, Jeff Gordon, Jimmie Johnson, Kurt Busch
  - Twelve uncommon cars: Rusty Wallace, Kyle Busch, Mark Martin, Kasey Kahne, Ryan Newman, Greg Biffle, Bobby Labonte, Jeremy Mayfield, Kevin Harvick, Casey Mears, Travis Kvapil, Carl Edwards
  - Twelve rare cars: Matt Kenseth, Brian Vickers, Jeff Burton, Jamie McMurray, and Dale Jarrett, plus variants of Wallace, Martin, Biffle, Stewart, Gordon, Kurt Busch, and Edwards.
  - Two promotional cars.
- Pocono Raceway map. (included in Limited Edition Starter Box with Joe Nemechek Promo Car)

=== Expansions ===
NASCAR Race Day 2006 Series 1

Released early 2006. This expansion was not a 2006 Nextel Cup update as some had hoped for, but was rather an addition to the 2005 season.

- Added cars: Dale Earnhardt Jr., Martin Truex Jr., Reed Sorenson
  - Many of the common and uncommon cars were virtually identical to their 2005 versions, a move which disappointed collectors.
  - There were four versions of Dale Earnhardt Jr. included in the series, all of which were visually identical (although they had different game statistics), which was also an unpopular decision.
- Added Martinsville Speedway map as the base four part constructed map.
- Added Daytona International Speedway map. (included in Limited Edition Starter Box with Dale Earnhardt Jr. Promo Car)

NASCAR Race Day 2006 Series 2

This expansion was announced in early 2006, but was confirmed to be cancelled when WizKids stopped supporting the line. According to industry magazines and comments from the WizKids forums, the line would have updated for the 2006 Nextel Cup season, and would have tentatively had the following additions:

- Added drivers: Michael Waltrip, Denny Hamlin, J. J. Yeley, possibly Elliott Sadler
- Offered multi-driver packs without blind-packing, allowing consumers to buy their favorite driver rather than search.

== Promotions ==
- 2005: Joe Nemechek, U.S. Army: Available only with limited edition box set.
- 2005: Jeremy Mayfield, "Top Banana" Dodge Charger: Available as a mail-in promotion.
- 2006: Dale Earnhardt Jr., Dale Earnhardt Incorporated: Available only with limited edition box set.
- 2006: Dale Earnhardt, Goodwrench Service Plus: Available only with Wal-Mart exclusive limited edition box set.
