= Dreamblade =

Collectible miniatures game

- Players: Two or Four
- Setup time: < 5 minutes
- Playing time: < 50 minutes
- Chance: Some
- Age range: 13 and up
- Skills: Miniatures; Arithmetic

Dreamblade is a collectible miniatures game created by Wizards of the Coast that debuted on August 9, 2006, the day before Gen Con Indy. The game is a strategy contest that includes an element of chance which comes into play through various die rolls.

Similar to Magic: The Gathering, each game represents a battle between very powerful individuals, in this case psychics called "Dream Lords." These Dream Lords battle one another across the landscape of humanity's collective unconscious by spawning dream creatures out of human emotions, in particular Valor, Fear, Madness, and Passion. Dreamblade's restricted landscape and army-building rules (among other things) result in many aspects which are more similar to a collectible card game than a typical miniature game.

In October 2007, Wizards of the Coast officially announced that they would no longer produce Dreamblade following the Night Fusion expansion set.

== Game play ==
In a game of Dreamblade, two players engage in a duel. The game is won by the first player to gain six "victory points". A "victory point" is gained by the player with the most "conquest points" at the end of a turn, earned by controlling territories and destroying your opponent's creatures. Some abilities also grant "victory points".

Each player begins with a warband composed of no more than 16 miniatures. In the course of the game these miniatures are put into play where they are used to accumulate conquest points towards winning the turn, and from there the game. There are two types of miniatures, creatures and locations. The miniatures, along with the playing area, and special six-sided attack dice comprise the unique elements of the game.

=== Game elements ===
Miniatures: The playing pieces of the game and the only element that is collectible. Each miniature will have a common, uncommon or rare designation. There are two types of miniatures, creatures and locations.

- Creatures: The basic attributes of every creature include its spawn-cost, aspect-cost, power, defense, and life. Additionally most creatures belong to one of the aspects of Valor, Fear, Madness, or Passion (represented by the color of their base), and may also have a lineage and/or special abilities. Anvilborn miniatures have no aspect, though they may still have lineages.
  - Cost: A miniature's cost has two parts—spawn cost and aspect cost.
    - Spawn Cost: The minimum number of spawn points a player has to spend to spawn the miniature. At the beginning of each turn, each player rolls one die, and the total represents the number of spawn points available for that turn.
    - Aspect Cost: Each miniature from the same aspect which is in play or in the graveyard counts as one point of the aspect cost, all remaining aspect-cost must be played using spawn points.
  - Power: The number of action dice the player rolls for the creature when it attacks.
  - Defense: The amount of damage it takes to disrupt a creature (remove it from its current space on the board).
  - Life: The amount of damage it takes to destroy a creature.
- Locations: Locations have a spawn cost and an aspect cost (just like creatures), but no power, defense or life. They cannot move, but offer some special ability to the rest of the warband.
- Aspects: Most miniatures belong to one of the four aspects of Valor, Fear, Madness, and Passion. The Anvilborn are mechanical in nature, and thus are not driven by the aspects (which are essentially 'feelings'). Each aspect has different qualities which are reflected as basic traits in the miniatures; for example creatures from the Madness aspect primarily have low Defense but high Life.
- Lineages: Some miniatures belong to a lineage. Lineages are creatures spawned by a specific dream lord or a group of dream lords. There are six lineages: Bloodcut, Janus, Lost, Hellbred, Hiveling, and Stitched.
- Abilities: The initial Dreamblade rulebook lists approximately 50 different miniature abilities. Blade abilities are the most common of these.
  - Blade Abilities: Blade abilities come in four types (blade, double blade, multiblade, and double multiblade), each representing the number of blades (a special symbol which may be rolled on the dice) which may be spent on the ability: one, two, unlimited, or an unlimited even number respectively. All rolled blades must be spent, which allows for the existence of blade abilities which have negative effects.
  - Spawn abilities: Spawn abilities are like blade abilities except that they are activated in the spawn phase by paying spawn points and sometimes may only be activated when in specific cells on the board.
  - Come into Play abilities: Come into play (CiP) abilities activate whenever the miniature is spawned, usually as an extra cost to playing the piece or as a special ability.
  - Drive abilities: Drive abilities are specific to Anvilborn creatures, from the third booster set. Each Anvilborn creature moves not by regular movement, but by being driven, which determines how it moves at the beginning of the Spawn phase.

Playing area: The playing area is a five by five grid. Players start out on opposite corners of the grid (this is known as the player's portal). The back row is known as the spawning row, and the center 3×3 grid is known as the key cells.

- Spawning Row: The row closest to a player is his or her Spawning Row; after the first round, players may spawn creatures in a cell in their spawning row that shares a column with another creature the player controls and is unoccupied.
- Key Cells: All of the cells within this 3×3 grid are worth conquest points to one or both of the players. The row closest to a player's spawning row is worth five, four or three conquest points to his opponent, starting with the cell corner adjacent to the player's portal. The center square of the middle row is worth two points to either player, while the other two cells are worth one point each. If a cell is contested (both players have creatures in the cell) then neither player receives any conquest points.

Attack Dice: Attack dice are six-sided (see the attached picture). Two of their faces count as misses (diamonds), three of the faces count as damage, with a one-point, two point, and three point damage face. The final face is the dreamblade, which is used to power the special abilities of the miniatures in the game; unlike other games, these abilities are not optional – any blades rolled on a turn must be used if possible.

== Tournament Play ==
Tournament play was a large part of Dreamblade. Wizards of the Coast held Duelists' Convocation International-sanctioned Dreamblade tournaments all over the world.

=== Formats ===
Constructed - Each player brings their premade warband of miniatures to the event. A warband must have no more than 16 miniatures and players may not use more than 3 of the same miniature.

Sealed Box - Players make a warband out of the miniatures they received from booster packs given out to each player as part of the tournament. If using three boosters, the warbands must have no more than 16 miniatures, as in constructed play. If using two boosters, the warbands must have no more than 12 miniatures, and once during the game at the start of the turn a player may take the miniatures in their graveyard and put them back in their reserves. (This is called the "refresh" rule.)

Booster Draft - Players assemble in groups, ideally consisting of 4 players each. Each group is called a "pod". Within each pod, boosters are opened one at a time, and players draft a single miniature from that booster, before passing the remainder to the next player in turn. This format can be done with either two or three boosters, and the maximum warband size requirements and "refresh" rule for two-booster format are the same as with Sealed Box.

=== Events ===
Edge - These were events held at local stores, and offered promotional alternate-paint miniatures as prizes.

1K - These were larger tournaments where the total prize awarded was $1000. The 1st-place winner received $500, 2nd place received $300, and 3rd and 4th places received $100 each.

10K - These were much larger international events where the total prize awarded was $10,000. The 1st-place winner earned $2000.

Championship - This event, which required qualification through earning enough points at other events, offered $50,000 in total prizes. The 1st-place winner earned $10,000. On August 19, 2007, at Gen Con, Ben Stoll won the only "Dream Series Championship" ever held.

Wizards of the Coast no longer supports these programs; independent tournament organizers could still sanction non-premier Dreamblade tournaments for some time afterwards but these have also been discontinued.

== Sets ==
Dreamblade sets were released on a three-month schedule:

=== Released Sets ===
- Base Set was released on August 9, 2006, and consists of 96 miniatures, divided as 32 of each rarity, and 24 of each Aspect.
- Baxar's War, released on October 27, 2006, was the first expansion for Dreamblade and consists of 60 miniatures: 20 of each rarity, 15 of each Aspect. New abilities introduced by this expansion include Poison and Terrify. A new lineage was also introduced for the Madness and Fear Aspects, called The Stitched.
- Chrysotic Plague, released on January 19, 2007, was the second expansion for Dreamblade and consists of 60 miniatures: 20 of each rarity, 15 of each Aspect. New abilities introduced by this expansion include Deathform and Shapechange. The Fear Aspect lineage Hivelings was also expanded with this release.
- Anvilborn, the third Dreamblade expansion was released on April 20, 2007. This expansion consists of 60 miniatures: 20 of each rarity, 13 of each Aspect, 8 'neutral' Anvilborn (all Rare or Uncommon).
- Night Fusion, the fourth and final Dreamblade expansion was released on September 7, 2007. This expansion consists of 60 miniatures: 20 of each rarity, 12 of each Aspect, and 12 multi-Aspect. New mechanics in this set include Dream Lords and Shield abilities.

=== Unreleased Sets ===
- Serrated Dawn, the fifth Dreamblade expansion which was canceled prior to production. On December 4, 2007, Wizards of the Coast released the stats for the pieces that would have been in Serrated Dawn.
