= Miniatures game =

Tabletop game

Miniatures games are a form of tabletop game which prominently features the use of miniature models or figures.

== War games ==
One of the oldest and most popular miniatures game genres is that of war games, where figures are arranged into competing "armies", with figures that represent ranks of troops or individual combatants. Naval wargaming is a variation of play where figures represents ships and do battle on the seas. Early wargames were focused on faithfully recreating historical battles with units represented by chips, blocks, and other abstract markers. The modern genre has expanded to include fantasy and science-fiction settings, often using intricately detailed and painted miniature figures.

== Miniatures in role-playing games ==
Tabletop role-playing games evolved from miniatures games, and the two genres have continued to be linked in varying degrees. One of the most cited examples of this connection is Dungeons & Dragons, which developed from a 1971 medieval miniature wargame called Chainmail. The first line of official Dungeons & Dragons miniatures was produced by Minifigs in 1976, and included iconic creatures such as Demogorgon. While the early editions of Dungeons & Dragons reduced or eliminated the use of miniatures, later versions reestablished their use as a core mechanism of the combat system. This even led full-circle into the development of Dungeons & Dragons Miniatures Game which acted as a stand-alone skirmish game without role-playing elements and as a set of accessories which could be used during Dungeons & Dragons play.

== Collectible miniatures games ==
As a result of the popularity of the collectible card game (CCG) genre starting in the 1990s, collectible miniatures games were developed that made use of elements of CCGs, such as selling miniature figures in randomized packs, with certain figures being assigned different rarities. This led to a secondary market where figures were resold and valued based on either their utility for play or rarity as a collectible.
