= Pirates Constructible Strategy Game =

Collectible miniatures game

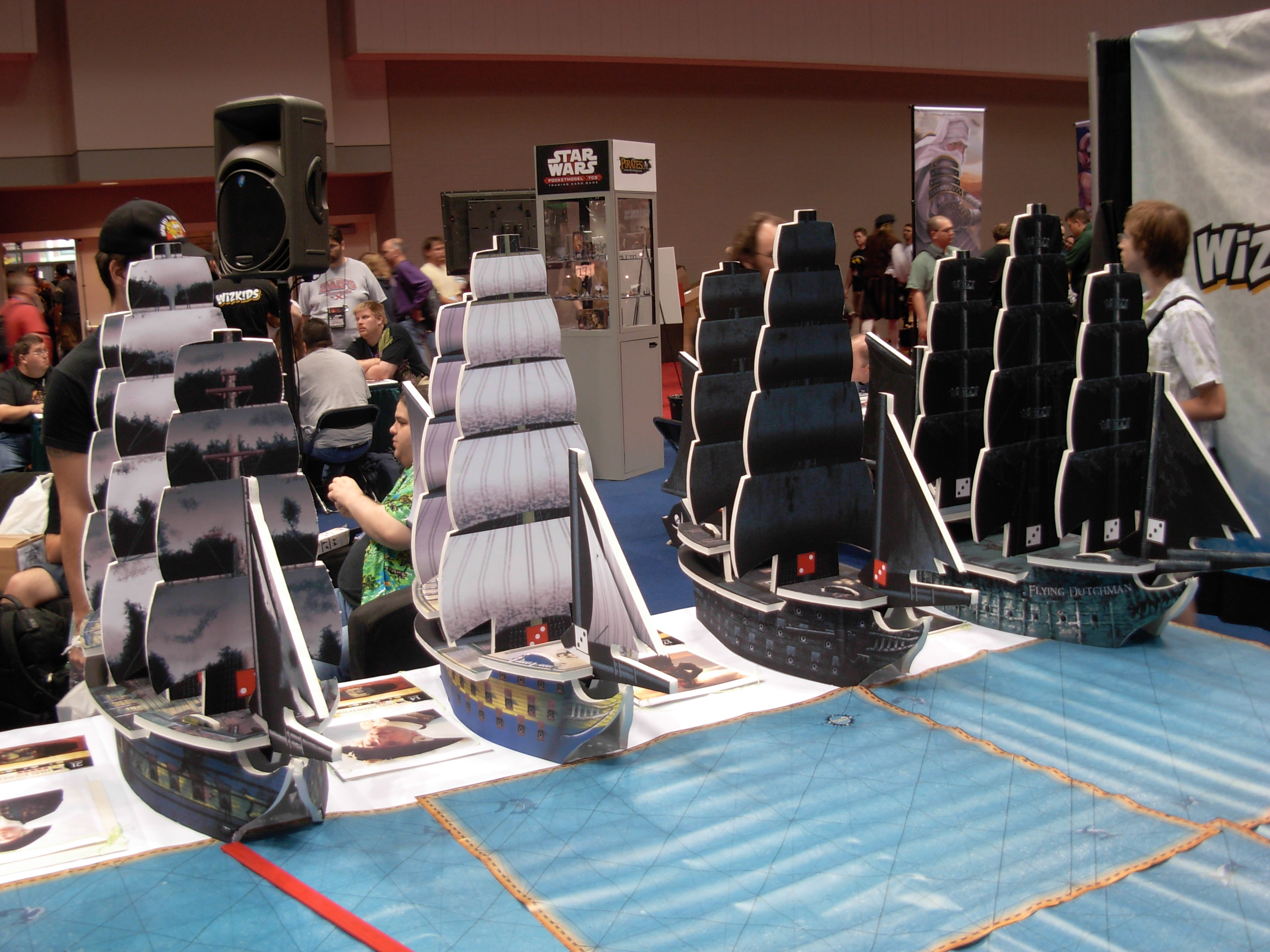
- Oversized Pirates models at Gen Con Indy 2007
- Players: 2–9
- Setup time: varies, usually 10 minutes
- Playing time: 30–180 minutes
- Chance: Considerable
- Age range: 8+
- Skills: Strategy, Dice rolling, Collecting

The Pirates Constructible Strategy Game is a tabletop game (or constructible strategy game) manufactured by WizKids, Inc., released in early July 2004, and discontinued in 2008.

== History ==
The game was created by Jordan Weisman, and designed by Mike Mulvihill, Ethan Pasternack, James Ernest, and Mike Selinker. It was released in early July 2004. With aspects of both miniatures game and collectible card game genres, Pirates is described by the producers WizKids as a constructible strategy game, referring to the mechanics of creating game pieces from components that punch out of styrene cards.

Pirates of the Spanish Main won a Vanguard Award at the 2005 Origins Awards.

In November 2008, Topps, the owner of Wizkids, announced that it would be closing the company and all of its product lines. On September 14, 2009, the National Entertainment Collectibles Association (NECA) announced the purchase of Wizkids name and its intellectual properties from Topps, including the Pirates line, which was then cancelled.

== Gameplay ==
The general goal of Pirates is to collect more gold than one's opponents, or with variants, to achieve a given objective or destroy all enemy ships. Additional scenarios also exist, created by WizKids and others. The game's pieces include ships, forts, sea monsters, crew, islands and other terrain markers, events, gold and other treasure tokens.

A feature of Pirates is the 'constructible' element of the game; each game piece is created by removing small polystyrene pieces from placeholder cards and assembling them. As the ship, fort or sea monster is damaged by enemies during the course of game play, pieces of it are removed to record how much damage it has sustained.

== Other media ==
An online computer game was also created, by Sony Online Entertainment, called Pirates CSG Online (based on Pirates of the Spanish Main), which ended on January 31, 2011. In 2007 Pinnacle Entertainment Group released The Pirates of the Spanish Main, a source book for their Savage Worlds role playing game, set in the same world as the CSG.

== Releases and expansion sets ==
- Pirates of the Spanish Main - first release, on July 28, 2004.
- Pirates of the Crimson Coast - second set and the first expansion to the Pirates of the Spanish Main, released March 2, 2005.
- Pirates of the Spanish Main—Unlimited Edition - released March 15, 2005, as a second reprint of the cards from the original "Pirates of the Spanish Main".
- Pirates of the Revolution - third installment of Pirates of the Spanish Main, released in June 2005
- Pirates of the Barbary Coast - released October 26, 2005
- Pirates of the South China Seas - released February 22, 2006
- Pirates of Davy Jones' Curse - released May 31, 2006
- Pirates of the Mysterious Islands - released November 15, 2006
- Pirates of the Frozen North - released February 14, 2007
- Pirates at Ocean's Edge - ninth expansion in the series, released April 18, 2007
- Pirates of the Caribbean PocketModel Game - released November 6, 2007 as a tie-in to the Pirates of the Caribbean movies
- Rise of the Fiends - released January 30, 2008
- Fire and Steel - released April 9, 2008
- Savage Shores - final expansion, released November 5, 2008
- Return to Savage Shores - scheduled for release in early 2009, but never released

== Reception ==
Reviews:

- Rebel Times
