= Pokémon Duel =

2016 video game

- Developer: Heroz
- Publisher: The Pokémon Company
- Directors: Naoto Ueoka; Tomohiro Takeuchi
- Producers: Naoki Satoh; Naoto Ueoka
- Designer: Masayuki Miura
- Artists: Isamu Tada; Shirou Mitsumata
- Writer: Masaru Hatano
- Composer: Shota Kageyama
- Series: Pokémon
- Platforms: Android, iOS
- Release: Android: JP: 12 April 2016; WW: 24 January 2017; iOS: JP: 19 April 2016; WW: 24 January 2017
- Genre: Digital tabletop
- Modes: Single-player, multiplayer

Pokémon Duel (Note: Japanese: ポケモンコマスター, Hepburn: Pokemon Komasutā; Japanese pronunciation: [pokemoŋ komaꜜsɯ̥taː]) was a free-to-play digital tabletop game developed by HEROZ and published by The Pokémon Company. The game was a mobile game adaptation of the Pokémon Trading Figure Game, a board game published in 2007 that used Pokémon action figures as game pieces. The game was developed out of a desire to bring the Trading Figure Game to Japanese audiences, as the board game had only been released overseas. Significant effort went into making sure the game was understandable to those unfamiliar with the game. This also led to the development of an in-game AI, which the player can use to gain advice on what move they should make.

It was initially released for Android and iOS devices in Japan under the title Pokémon Comaster in April 2016, and later released in other territories in January 2017. The game received mixed reviews from critics, who highlighted the game's strategic elements and entertaining gameplay, but criticized other aspects of the game, such as its slow loading times, reliance on pay-to-win elements, and luck-based gameplay. On 26 July 2019, The Pokémon Company announced that the game would be terminating its service on 31 October 2019.

== Gameplay ==
A multiplayer match in Pokémon Duel. The red and blue circles indicate the goals. Figures at the corners of the image were knocked out.

Pokémon Duel was a free-to-play digital tabletop game set in the Pokémon franchise. Gameplay is based on that of the Pokémon Trading Figure Game. Two players use teams of six Pokémon figurines, each with unique "moves" and "abilities". Both players start with all figures on the "bench" and attempt to reach a goal point on the opposite side of the board while preventing their opponent from doing the same. Figures may "battle" adjacent ones, with battles involving roulette-styled wheels with differing-sized segments from which a move is chosen randomly. Moves have one of several colors, and the colors of the battling figures' moves determine the outcome of the battle. White and gold moves deal numerical damage; the figure which spins a lower damage value is knocked out and moved to the "P.C.", temporarily decommissioning it. Purple moves, which often give detrimental status effects to opponents, beat white moves but lose to gold moves. Blue moves beat all other colors, but often have no effect of their own, simply cancelling the battle. Red "miss" moves lose to any opposing move. Figures may also be "surrounded" by occupying all adjacent spots with figures of the opposing team; this knocks the surrounded figure out without initiating battle. Players may also use "plates", which give additional effects for figures such as dealing additional damage or moving them in ways not otherwise permitted. A player may select up to six plates as part of setting up their "deck" of figures. In addition to reaching the goal point, a player may also win by forcing their opponent to run out of time (5 minutes in a multiplayer game) or by leaving their opponent unable to make a valid move on their turn (a "wait win").

Figures have several different tiers of rarity, with each determining their strengths in gameplay. Figures can be obtained by purchasing boosters in a gacha-like manner using purchasable in-game currency known as gems. These boosters can be obtained through gameplay, though can only be opened six hours after being obtained. Figures can be upgraded further by fusing them with other figures and items, using another in-game currency known as coins in the process. The game offers online multiplayer gameplay along with a single-player campaign where the player participates in the "Pokémon Figure World Championships". For multiplayer, the player holds overall and monthly ratings which are boosted by victories and reduced by defeats, using an Elo rating system. Regardless of which mode is chosen, the game requires a constant internet connection to play.

=== Synopsis ===
In the single-player quest line, the player is a participant in the Pokémon Figure World Championships held on Carmonte Island, which hosts a large amount of hotels, with each headed by a hotel leader. Wearing a mask throughout the competition, the player befriends several other competitors as they attempt to defeat each hotel leader. Throughout the challenge, the player's progress is followed by a group known as the Roger family, who eye the player's seemingly-sentient AI named Carlo.

== Development and release ==
Pokémon Duel was developed by Japanese company HEROZ and published by The Pokémon Company. The game is directly based on the Pokémon Trading Figure Game, a board game that used action figures as the pieces. Masayuki Miura and Koichi Oyama, the creators of the Trading Figure Game, acted as advisors for the game. Miura wished to adapt the Trading Figure Game for Japanese audiences, but was unable to initially. Deciding that an app would be better suited for release, the choice was made to adapt it as a mobile game. HEROZ was contacted to help with development of Duel due to their prior work on the app Shogi Wars. Miura stated that the game was designed to be unprecedented for a board game at the time, and its adaptation into Duel was thus complicated.

The development team put significant effort into recreating the Trading Figure Game's rules and making them understandable to those unfamiliar with the game and the franchise, as Miura had previously been told by the president and CEO of The Pokémon Company that the game was "too difficult." Effort was also put into making sure each species of Pokémon had a usable niche in the game, with each species having its own advantages and disadvantages to balance the game. The team had difficulty programming the game's AI due to the complexity of the game's rules, and trained it by simulating tens of thousands of games and choosing the best moves in each situation. The AI was designed in order to help the player in case they needed help at any point, with the AI being trained to a point that it made better moves than many members of the human development team. They hoped it would also help provide a significant challenge as an opponent to players once they got familiar with the game's rules.

Obtaining figures in the game was designed around its "gacha" mechanics, but was also designed so there was a limit on spending in order to prevent receiving excess money from players of the game. Other mechanics were introduced so if players want a specific figure, it can be obtained without the use of the gacha mechanics. Duel was the first Pokémon game designed specifically for mobile devices; as a result, there were many hiccups in development in order to support the number of devices the game would be released on.

The game was announced in March 2016 as Pokémon Comaster for Japan. The name for the game was decided by combining the words "co" (meaning together) and "master" (to symbolize the relationship between the figurines and the game's AI). The name was also chosen so those unfamiliar with the game would be able to grasp its core concepts upon just hearing the name. Comaster was released for Android devices on 12 April 2016, and iOS devices on 19 April 2016. The game later released in other territories under the title Pokémon Duel on 24 January 2017.

In July 2019, The Pokémon Company announced that the service for Pokémon Duel would be discontinued on 31 October 2019, with in-app purchases being discontinued in the months prior to its shutdown.

== Reception ==
Reception

Aggregate score
Aggregator	Score
Metacritic	63/100

Review scores
Publication	Score
Destructoid	6/10
GamesMaster	68%
Nintendo Life	6/10 stars
Gamezebo	3.5/5 stars

Pokémon Duel received "mixed or average reviews" from professional critics according to review aggregator website Metacritic. Joe Merrick at Nintendo Life found the game to be a "mixed bag". He stated that while the game was strategic and had good graphics and audio, the game relied too heavily on in-app purchases and an overreliance on luck in battle, though that it had potential to improve with future updates. CJ Andriessen, writing for Destructoid, found the game to be fun, highlighting the inclusion of the story mode campaign. He criticized the game's slow loading times and maintenance issues, as well as the amount of real-world time it takes to obtain new figures. Nick Tylwalk, writing for Gamezebo, stated that the game's gameplay and competitive nature were highlights, finding them to be superior to other Pokémon franchise mobile game Pokémon Go. He criticized the game's loading and connection issues, as well as the game's reward system, believing that it took too long to receive the rewards obtained from playing the game.

Andrew Webster, writing for The Verge, found the game to be a fun experience, though criticized the game's overcomplicated menus and its "generic" character designs. Will Greenwald, writing for PCMag, found the gameplay strategic and fun, and highlighted the game's free to play nature. He criticized the game's luck-based elements, feeling they undermined the strategy elements of the game. AJ Moser, writing for The Daily Dot, criticized the game, finding its gameplay loop unsatisfying and that other issues, such as unresponsive controls and frequent connection issues, made gameplay more difficult. Harry Slater, writing in a review for Pocket Gamer, criticized the game, stating that while the game had potential, its connection issues meant games took incredibly long and frequently led to crashes.

By the end of 2018, the game had reached 37.8 million downloads and grossed $21.6 million. As of March 2019, the game had reached over 40 million downloads.
