= Dungeons & Dragons Miniatures Game =

Wargame played using miniature figures

- Publishers: Wizards of the Coast
- Years active: 2003–2011
- Chance: Medium-High
- Skills: Strategy, Planning

Several figures from the Dungeons & Dragons Miniatures Game

The Dungeons & Dragons Miniatures Game is a collectible miniatures game played with pre-painted, plastic miniature figures based on characters and monsters from the Dungeons & Dragons game. The figures are 30mm in scale. Produced by Wizards of the Coast, the Dungeons & Dragons Miniatures line is composed of 20 loosely themed sets that were released roughly every four months since the line was launched in 2003 until its cancellation in 2011.

== History ==
The Dungeons & Dragons Miniatures Game, commonly referred to as DDM, served as Wizards of the Coast's official line of miniature figures for the Dungeons & Dragons game beginning in 2003, following the cancellation of the previous Dungeons & Dragons-based miniatures game, Chainmail, in August 2002. The first set, Harbinger, was released on September 26, 2003. This set was available in both Starter Sets, containing 16 random miniatures, a 20-sided die, a rulebook and maps and terrain to play the game on, as well as Booster Packs with 8 random miniatures. Each miniature also came with a card that detailed the statistics of the figure for the miniatures game on one side, and the statistics for use in the role-playing game on the opposite side.

Following that first release, 20 additional expansion sets were released. Five of these sets (Giants of Legend, War of the Dragon Queen, Against the Giants, Legendary Evils, and Lords of Madness) contain figures standing on 3-inch-diameter (76 mm) bases, larger than the 2 inch bases of the largest figures in normal sets. This size is designated “Huge” in the nomenclature of Dungeons & Dragons, and the boosters containing these larger figures are known as “huge packs.”

All figures are one of three rarities, indicated by a marking on the bottom of the miniature:

- "common"
- "uncommon"
- "rare".

From Harbinger to the Demonweb expansion, all standard-sized booster packs contained 4 commons, 3 uncommons and 1 rare. The Starter Set miniatures for Harbinger, Aberrations and War Drums included 1 rare, 5 uncommon and 10 common miniatures. Dangerous Delves and Savage Encounters each contained 2 commons, 1 uncommon, 1 non-random visible uncommon, and 1 rare. The four Huge sets listed above had different distributions of figures. Giants of Legend boosters contained 4 commons, 3 uncommons, 1 rare, and 1 huge, either rare or uncommon, while War of the Dragon Queen and Against the Giants each contained 3 commons, 3 uncommons, 1 rare, and 1 rare or uncommon huge. Legendary Evils boosters had 2 commons, 1 medium-sized rare, 1 large-sized rare, and 1 visible huge figure. The summer 2010 set Lords of Madness was the first and only set to contain very rares, a rarity previously used in Wizards of the Coast's Star Wars Miniatures game.

The game has gone through a number of major revisions since its inception. In early 2008 the game was changed significantly to maintain continuity with the Dungeons & Dragons fourth edition rules. This set of rules is known unofficially as D&D Miniatures 2.0. The first set released under this revision was Dungeons of Dread in April 2008. Additionally, over the course of the next year, all existing miniatures received updated stats so they would be playable in the new game.

Less than a year later, in October 2008, Wizards of the Coast announced that the way miniatures would be packaged was changing. The miniatures would be sold in partially random monster packs, with one visible figure, under the Monster Manual name, and a new line of non-random minis called Player's Handbook Heroes featuring player character (PC) races. Shortly after that, another announcement was posted, clarifying these new changes. Following the release of the Demonweb expansion, the Dungeons & Dragons Miniatures skirmish game would no longer be supported by Wizards of the Coast. Skirmish statistics would no longer be included with the figures, and no further tournaments would be officially sanctioned. Instead, the miniatures line would be marketed solely to RPG users.

Since November, 2008, a group called the DDM Guild, founded and run by members of the fan community, has been granted the exclusive and worldwide right to continue to support and develop the D&D Minis skirmish game. Wizards of the Coast continues to provide DCI support as well as proprietary information on future set lists to the DDM Guild.

Changes were announced at D&D Experience 2010, when it was revealed that the miniatures line would once again revert to entirely random packaging, with both PC and monster minis combined in one set.

On January 12, 2011, Wizards of the Coast announced the immediate end of the Dungeons & Dragons Miniatures line.

D&D Miniatures was consistently one of the top collectible games in hobby channel sales, with recent rankings from the industry magazine ICv2 placing the game as the 3rd best selling collectible game. In 2010, the Dungeons & Dragons Miniatures line won the ENnies Award for Best Miniatures Product.

== Gameplay ==
Unlike Dungeons & Dragons, which like most role-playing games has players playing the part of a single character, the Dungeons & Dragons Miniatures Game is a miniatures wargame in which two opponents pit armies of creatures against each other. In order to allow rule adjudication without a Dungeon Master, the DDM rules are a streamlined form of the d20 system, with a few additional features unique to the skirmish game. The game has gone through several revisions since the original Harbinger rules set, including revisions after Aberrations and Wardrums. In early 2008, the game was updated to be consistent with the fourth edition Dungeons & Dragons rules.

Each creature has a designated point cost, and players assemble a warband of a certain cost, generally either 100, 200, or 500 points, depending on the tournament format. From Harbinger to Underdark, games were played on tiles arranged on a grid, while from War Drums onward, full-color printed battle maps were used. Players use a 20-sided die to determine if an attack succeeds and also for various other checks throughout the game. Victory goes to the player who first accumulates a given number of points by either destroying the opponent's figures or collecting points by occupying certain areas of the map

== Sets ==
Most D&D Miniatures sets consist of 60 figures, although exceptions to this are noted below.

The expansion sets for Dungeons & Dragons Miniatures, in order of release, are:

Set Name	Release Date	Gallery	Additional Information
Harbinger	September 26, 2003		80 miniatures in set. Available in starter and booster packs.
Dragoneye	December 19, 2003		
Archfiends	March 25, 2004		
Giants of Legend	June 18, 2004		72 miniatures in set.
Aberrations	October 14, 2004		Available in starter and booster packs.
Deathknell	March 24, 2005		
Angelfire	July 21, 2005		
Underdark	November 3, 2005		
War Drums	March 3, 2006		Available in starter and booster packs.
War of the Dragon Queen	July 7, 2006		
Blood War	November 6, 2006		
Unhallowed	March 5, 2007		
Night Below	July 6, 2007		
Desert of Desolation	October 26, 2007		
Dungeons of Dread	March 28, 2008		First set using DDM 2.0 rules. Available in boosters and non-random starter packs.
Against the Giants	July 12, 2008		
Demonweb	November 7, 2008		
Feywild	Cancelled		Cancelled. Some minis printed with the Feywild logo escaped the factory and were sold online.
Monster Manual: Dangerous Delves	May 19, 2009		First set without skirmish rules included and with visible miniatures. 40 miniatures in set.
Monster Manual: Legendary Evils	August 18, 2009		40 miniatures in set.
Monster Manual: Savage Encounters	November 17, 2009		40 miniatures in set.
Lords of Madness	September 21, 2010		Return to 60 miniatures in set and fully random packaging. Final set in the line.

== Icons ==
Four large standalone figures, called Icons, were released. These were the Gargantuan Black Dragon released in August 2006, the Colossal Red Dragon released in September 2006, the Gargantuan Blue Dragon released in January 2007, and the Gargantuan Orcus, released in 2010. There is one Icon Scenario Pack called the Legend of Drizzt Scenario Pack released September 2007. It features 2 miniature figures: Drizzt Do'Urden, and Wulfgar, and one large figure: Icingdeath the Gargantuan White Dragon.

The Icons line of Dungeons & Dragons Miniatures has won two major fantasy gaming awards, with the Colossal Red Dragon winning at the Origins Awards in 2007 for Best Miniature or Miniatures Line of the Year, and the Legend of Drizzt Scenario Pack winning the 2008 ENnies Award for Best Miniature Product.

== Player's Handbook Heroes ==
In 2009, Wizards of the Coast released two series of 18 non-random figures designed to represent player characters in Dungeons & Dragons under the name Player's Handbook Heroes. The sets were sold in packs containing three figures, and were made up of a combination of repaints of older figures, figures taken from the canceled Feywild set, and entirely new figures. A third set was planned for 2010, but was canceled.

== Collector's Sets ==
On November 16, 2010, Wizards of the Coast released the Beholder's Collector Set, featuring four beholders: Beholder Eye of Frost, a Ghost Beholder, an Eye of Shadow, and a Beholder Eye Tyrant. The Ghost Beholder and the Eye of Shadow were new sculpts.

In November 2011, Wizards of the Coast released a Dragon Collector's set featuring five dragons, one in each of D&D's standard colors for chromatic dragons. The green and white dragon sculpts were new additions to the line, while the red, blue, and black dragon sculpts were reissued from earlier products.

== Future of the game ==
The DDM Guild continues to release new stats and new variations and scenarios of the game, as well as support national championships.

Figures from the D&D Miniatures line have been used in other games from Wizards of the Coast, including the Dungeons & Dragons Basic Game, Heroscape and the Dungeons & Dragons board games Castle Ravenloft, Wrath of Ashardalon and The Legend of Drizzt. Wizards of the Coast discontinued the production of D&D Miniatures in 2011.

In 2012, Wizards of the Coast released Dungeon Command, the successor to the D&D Miniatures skirmish game. Dungeon Command's gameplay bears some similarities to the D&D Miniatures game, but features a diceless combat system and a new component, order cards. Dungeon Command components are sold in "faction packs" that include miniatures, map tiles, and statistics cards for both Dungeon Command and Wizards' Adventure System line of games. As of March 2013, Wizards had released five Dungeon Command faction packs; the majority of miniatures used in these faction packs are reissued models from earlier D&D Miniatures sets, though the fifth featured all new miniatures. Stats for all new sculpts were released by the DDM Guild on their website, and thus all Dungeon Command miniatures are legal for Dungeons & Dragons Miniatures play.

In February 2014, Wizards of the Coast and WizKids announced that the latter would be creating a new line of D&D Miniatures. On July 15, 2014 WizKids released the first set of their new line of D&D Miniatures under the label of D&D Icons of the Realms brand.

== Reviews ==
- Coleção Dragon Slayer
