= 2010 in games =

This page lists board and card games, wargames, miniatures games, and tabletop role-playing games published in 2010. For video games, see 2010 in video gaming.

== Games released or invented in 2010 ==
- 51st State
- 7 Wonders
- Agricola: Gamers' Deck
- Agricola: The Goodies Expansion
- Agricola: The Legen*dairy Forest Deck
- Arkham Horror: The Lurker at the Threshold Expansion
- Axis & Allies: Europe 1940
- BattleLore: Creatures
- BattleLore: Dragons
- BattleLore: Horrific Horde
- Battle Sheep
- Brushfire =Historia Rodentia=
- Carcassonne: Bridges, Castles, and Bazaars
- Castle Ravenloft
- Civilization (based on the video game)
- Conflict of Heroes: First Men In - Normandy 1944
- Cthulhu Dice
- Battlestar Galactica: Exodus Expansion
- Dixit 2
- Dominant Species
- Dominion: Alchemy
- Dominion: Prosperity
- Evolution: The Origin of Species
- Fresco
- Game For Fame
- Guardians of Graxia
- Hanabi
- Horus Heresy
- Keltis: Das Orakel
- Kraken-Alarm
- Le Havre: Le Grand Hameau
- Heroscape Master Set: Battle for the Underdark
- Labyrinth: The War on Terror, 2001 – ?
- Last Night on Earth: Hero Pack 1
- Last Night on Earth: Survival of the Fittest
- London
- Memoir '44: Winter Wars
- Panzer General: Russian Assault
- Papayoo
- Race for the Galaxy: The Brink of War
- Settlers of America: Trails to Rails
- Small World: Be Not Afraid
- Small World: Necromancer Island
- Small World: Tales and Legends
- Space Alert: The New Frontier
- Thunderstone: Doomgate Legion
- Thunderstone: Wrath of the Elements
- Tide of Iron: Fury of the Bear
- Tikal II
- Times Tables Rock Stars
- Transformice
- Trickster
- Washington's War
- Whack & Slaughter
- Zombies!!! 9: Ashes to Ashes

== Game awards given in 2010 ==
- Mensa Select: Anomia, Dizios, Forbidden Island, Word on the Street, Yikerz!
- Spiel des Jahres: Dixit
- Games: Jump Gate
- Troyes won the Spiel Portugal Jogo do Ano.

== Deaths ==
Date	Name	Age	Notability
March 20	John Eric Holmes	80	designed the original Dungeons & Dragons Basic Set
May 22	Martin Gardner	95	Math and science writer who also designed games
May 31	Chris Haney	59	Co-designer of Trivial Pursuit
June 6	Abraham Nathanson	80	Graphic designer who created Bananagrams
June 25	Paddy Griffith	63	Wargame designer
August 20	Charles S. Roberts	80	"The Father of Board Wargaming", founder of Avalon Hill
October 4	Brian Williams	54	illustrator

== See also ==
- List of game manufacturers
- 2010 in video gaming
