= 51st state (disambiguation) =

"51st state" is a phrase that refers to areas considered candidates for addition to the 50 states already part of the United States.

51st State may also refer to:

- "51st State" (song), a 1986 song by New Model Army
- The 51st State, a 2001 British film
- 51st State, a 1998 novel by Peter Preston
- 51st State (board game), a 2010 board game
- The 51st State (television program), 1972–1976 television program
