= Mike Elliott (game designer) =

American game designer

Mike Elliott (sometimes credited as Michael Elliott) is a Seattle-based board game, card game and mobile game designer whose titles include Magic: The Gathering, Thunderstone, and Battle Spirits Trading Card Game. Magic head designer Mark Rosewater called him "one of the most prolific Magic designers in the history of the game." He was inducted into the Academy of Adventure Gaming Arts & Design Hall of Fame at the 2017 Origins Game Fair.

== Career ==
While living in Phoenix, Arizona in the early 1990s, Elliott and several of his friends were active bridge players and competed regularly in tournaments. One evening after a tournament, a friend introduced the group to the Magic: The Gathering trading card game. When Elliott returned home he purchased the game and began playing in Magic tournaments. While at a Magic tournament at Arizona State University Elliott told two fellow attendees what he thought was wrong with the game. During the conversation they revealed that they worked for Wizards of the Coast. One of them, Joel Mick, invited Elliott to fly to Seattle and interview for a position with the company.

=== Wizards of the Coast ===
Elliott started at Wizards of the Coast in January 1996 as a developer. Afterward he was promoted to designer, and then senior designer. He worked on approximately 30 Magic expansions and introduced new mechanics such as slivers. His Magic related expansions and project included:

Designing

- Portal
- Weatherlight
- Tempest (the card Emmessi Tome was named in his honor; M.S.E. - Michael Scott Elliott).
- Stronghold (lead)
- Portal Second Age
- Exodus (lead)
- Urza's Saga (lead)
- Urza's Legacy (lead)
- Unglued
- Mercadian Masques (lead)
- Nemesis (lead)
- Fifth Edition (lead)
- Invasion
- Vanguard I (lead)
- Vanguard II (lead)
- Planeshift (lead)
- Torment
- Judgement
- Onslaught (lead)
- Legions (lead)
- Scourge
- Mirrodin
- Champions of Kamigawa
- Betrayers of Kamigawa (lead)
- Ravnica: City of Guilds
- Guildpact (lead)

Developing

- Mirage
- Visions
- Portal
- Weatherlight (lead)
- Tempest
- Stronghold (lead)
- Portal Second Age
- Exodus
- Urza's Saga (lead)
- Urza's Legacy
- Urza's Destiny (lead)
- Mercadian Masques
- Nemesis
- Fifth Edition (lead)
- Prophecy
- Apocalypse (lead)
- Odyssey
- Judgement
- Scourge
- Fifth Dawn
- Champions of Kamigawa

While at Wizards of the Coast he also designed non-Magic games including Harry Potter Trading Card Game, Neopets Trading Card Game, Hecatomb, and Duel Masters Trading Card Game. Elliott left Wizards of the Coast at the end of 2005.

=== WizKids ===
After leaving Wizards of the Coast, Elliott worked for WizKids until the company closed its Seattle office. His titles for WizKids included Star Wars PocketModel Trading Card Game, Halo ActionClix, and DC HeroClix: Batman (Alpha).

=== Freelance career ===
As a freelance game designer and developer, Mike Elliott, has designed dozens of games. Notable titles include Battle Spirits Trading Card Game, Thunderstone, Quarriors! and Star Trek: Fleet Captains He also designed Card-Jitsu, an online mini-game in the Club Penguin children's MMO and worked on Hearthstone in early 2017.

==== Battle Spirits ====
In 2008 Elliott designed the Battle Spirits Trading Card Game for Bandai. Part of the Battle Spirits franchise—which also includes several anime series, manga serializations and other merchandise such as toys and video games—the TCG was released in Japan in September 2008. Battle Spirits became one of the top selling trading card games of the year.

The game's popularity led to Elliott's appearance in promotional videos, and a new character based on him being added to the anime series Battle Spirits: Shōnen Toppa Bashin. The "Michael Elliott" character was an eccentric American game designer who created the titular Battle Spirits card game played in the series.

Battle Spirits Trading Card Game was released in the United States by Bandai of America on August 14, 2009.

==== Thunderstone ====
In 2009 Elliott designed Thunderstone card game for Alderac Entertainment Group. The game won several awards and nominations, including 2010 Golden Geek Best Card Game Nominee, 2010 Japan Boardgame Prize Voters' Selection Nominee, 2010 JoTa Best Card Game Audience Award, 2010 JoTa Best Card Game Critic Award and 2011 Fairplay À la carte Winner. Alderac relaunched Thunderstone in 2017 as Thunderstone Quest with a Kickstarter that raised more than $500,000.

==== Quarriors! and Dice Masters ====
In 2012 Elliott designed the Quarriors! dice building game. Published by WizKids, the game won the 2013 Origins Awards for Best Family, Party or Children's Game.

The Quarriors! Dice Masters system expanded to include The Lord of the Rings Dice Building Game, Marvel Dice Masters, DC Comics Dice Masters, Dungeons & Dragons Dice Masters, Yu-Gi-Oh! Dice Masters, and Teenage Mutant Ninja Turtles Dice Masters. WizKids reported that Marvel Dice Masters: Avengers vs. X-Men sold out within its first week of release and in 2015, Marvel Dice Masters won the Origins Vanguard Award.

==== Shadowrun: Crossfire and Dragonfire ====
Eliott helped design Shadowrun: Crossfire, The Adventure Deck-building Game for Fire Opal Media and Catalyst Game Labs. Released in August 2014, the game is a cooperative card game that combines elements of roleplaying games and deck-building card games. Dragonfire, a cooperative deck-builder game based on the Dungeons & Dragons roleplaying game and using the Crossfire game engine, was launched in 2017.

=== Credits ===
==== Magic: The Gathering ====
- Lead Designer Magic Guildpact Expansion
- Lead Designer Magic Betrayers of Kamigawa Expansion
- Lead Designer Magic Legions Expansion
- Lead Designer Magic Onslaught Expansion
- Lead Designer Magic Planeshift Expansion
- Lead Designer Magic Nemesis Expansion
- Lead Designer Magic Mercadian Masques Expansion
- Lead Designer Magic Urza’s Legacy Expansion
- Lead Designer Magic Urza’s Saga Expansion
- Lead Designer Magic Exodus Expansion
- Lead Designer Magic Stronghold Expansion
- Designer Magic Ravnica Expansion
- Designer Magic Champions of Kamigawa Expansion
- Designer Magic Mirrodin Expansion
- Designer Magic Judgment Expansion
- Designer Magic Torment Expansion
- Designer Magic Invasion Expansion
- Designer Magic Tempest Expansion
- Designer Magic Weatherlight Expansion
- Lead Designer/Developer Magic 5th Edition Expansion
- Lead Developer Apocalypse Magic Expansion
- Lead Developer Nemesis Magic Expansion
- Lead Developer Urza’s Destiny Magic Expansion
- Lead Developer Urza’s Saga Magic Expansion
- Lead Developer Stronghold Magic Expansion
- Lead Developer Weatherlight Magic Expansion
- Developer Fifth Dawn Magic Expansion
- Developer Scourge Magic Expansion
- Developer Judgment Magic Expansion
- Developer Odyssey Magic Expansion
- Developer Exodus Magic Expansion
- Developer Prophecy Magic Expansion
- Lead Designer Vanguard Magic game play accessory

==== Computer games ====
- Research and Development lead Magic Interactive Computer Encyclopedia
- Research and Development lead Microprose Magic Computer Game
- Designer Cardjitsu Trading Card Game for Club Penguin Website

==== Original game design credits ====
===== Trading card games =====
- Battle Spirits Trading Card Game 2008
- Duelmasters Trading Card Game 2002
- Neopets Trading Card game 2003 – 2006
- Harry Potter Trading Card game 1999-2001
- Xiaolin Showdown Trading Card game 2005 - 2006
- Hecatomb Trading Card game 2005 – 2006
- Simpsons Trading Card game 2002
- Charm Angel Trading Card Game (Japan) – 2006- 2007
- UzuMajin Trading Card Game (Japan) 2007- 2008
- Cardjitsu/Disney Club Penguin Trading Card Game 2008–present
- Topps Attax Baseball Trading Card Game 2009
- Puck Attax Hockey Trading Card Game 2010
- Star Wars Force Attax Trading Card Game 2012
- Yo-kai Watch Trading Card Game 2016
- Dragoborne: Rise to Supremacy 2017

===== Single deck card games =====
- Earthquake Card game 1997
- Instinct Card game 1997
- Agent Hunter Card game 2013
- Final Touch 2016
- The Dingo Ate The Baby 2017

===== Miniatures games =====
- Dreamblade Anvilborn expansion 2006
- Axis and Allies Naval Miniatures 2006- 2011
- Star Wars Pocketmodel Trading Card Game 2007-2008
- Halo Actionclix Miniatures Game 2007-2008
- Mechwarrior Solaris VII Miniatures 2007-2008
- Heroclix Alpha Miniatures Game 2008

===== Board games =====
- Sword and Skull 2005
- Thunderstone/Thunderstone Advance 2009–2014 Base game and expansions
- Star Trek Fleet Captains 2011–2014 Base game and expansions
- Quarriors Dice Building Game 2011–2014 Base game and expansions
- Lost Legends 2013
- Sangoku 2013
- Shadowrun: Crossfire 2013
- Lord of the Rings Dice Building Game 2012
- Marvel Dice Masters 2013
- Yu-Gi-Oh! Dice Masters 2014
- DC Comics Dice Masters 2015
- Dungeons & Dragons Dice Masters 2015
- Teenage Mutant Ninja Turtles Dice Masters 2016
- Speechless 2016
- Dragonfire 2017
- Shutterbug 2017
- Immortals 2017
- Thunderstone Quest 2018

===== iOS and digital games =====
- Thunderstone 2011
- Connect with Pieces: Pacific Rim 2013
- Quarriors 2013
- Letter Pix 2014

===== Other brands =====
- Wizards of the Coast R&D lead Pokémon TCG 1999-2001
- Lead Developer X-Men Trading Card Game
- Lead Developer Star Wars Trading Card Game
- Designer WOTC Star Wars TCG /Set design on 5 expansions
- Designer Netrunner Classic expansion
- Lead Designer Heritage WWE Flip and Fight Card Game System
- Connect With Pieces 2012
