= Hecatomb (card game) =

Collectible trading card game

- Hecatomb card front
- Designers: Mike Elliott and Jonathan Tweet
- Publishers: Wizards of the Coast
- Players: 2 or more
- Setup time: < 2 minutes
- Playing time: < 20 minutes
- Chance: Some
- Age range: 12+
- Skills: Card playing Arithmetic

Hecatomb is an out-of-print collectible card game created by Wizards of the Coast. The base set of 144 cards was released on August 18, 2005 at the annual Gen Con Indy. The game is unique in its use of five-sided, stackable cards made of durable plastic as opposed to conventional paperboard. The original concept for the game is credited to Paul Barclay, Brandon Bozzi, Mike Elliott, Aaron Forsythe, and Robert Gutschera.

== Sets ==
The game was available for purchase in comic and hobby game oriented stores across the United States and internationally (but only in English), its 144-card set sold in starter sets of 40 random cards (MSRP $12.99) and booster packs of 13 additional cards (MSRP $4.99).

The first expansion, Last Hallow's Eve, was released on October 28, 2005, adding another 144 cards to the game. The expected theme of the expansion was the superstitions and myths about Halloween, but it turned out to be more of the same themes from the base set.

The second expansion, Blanket of Lies, came out on February 24, 2006 and added 72 cards. Its theme is that of extraterrestrial invasion. This was the last Hecatomb expansion released.

On May 24, 2006, Hecatomb was discontinued. One of the game's designers has unofficially cited the rising cost of oil (used in the manufacture of the plastic cards) as part of the reason for the discontinuation.

== Objective ==
In the game, each player takes on the role of a powerful endbringer, one whose goal is to destroy the world by using creatures called abominations to reap souls until they have enough power to bring about the apocalypse. Other endbringers have the same goal, and the players battle for the right to bring about armageddon. The player who ends the world gains power and moves on to another world to repeat the process.

== Mechanics ==
Hecatomb shares a number of mechanics with Magic: The Gathering, including the concept of "tapping" mana cards to play other cards of the same color from, and the way attacking and blocking works (with unblocked attacks moving the attacker closer to victory).

The key new game mechanic in Hecatomb is the way abominations are constructed. Abominations are made up of from one to five minion cards, with the minions being stacked on top of each other. Each new minion is rotated as it is played onto an existing abomination. Because of the way the cards are constructed, with five sides and four transparent edges, the cards underneath can continue to be seen, and hence an abomination is a combination of all of their strengths and powers. Bonuses or special effects can be triggered when a minion of the correct color is played on top of the stack (based on the exposed trigger color of the minion which was previously on top).

When abominations fight each other, damage is dealt from the top to the bottom of the minion stack. It is thus possible to have an abomination be reduced in size without being completely killed by having its upper minions destroyed. This adds additional strategy considerations when building up abominations, as one can somewhat protect weaker minions by placing stronger minions above them.

Another mechanic which differs from Magic: The Gathering is the way in which any card can be played as a mana card, alleviating the need to have a certain percentage of cards which do nothing more than power other cards. This mechanic is also used in the Call of Cthulhu Collectible Card Game.

== Card types ==
Hecatomb features four different types of cards:

- Minions - The hideous creatures of the game. Minions are stacked to form abominations, which are then used to reap souls or defend against enemy reaping attempts.
- Fates - Occurrences. Fates represent curses, tricks, or other events. Fates have a one-time effect, after which they are discarded.
- Relics - Objects which have strange magical or technological powers. Relics have a continuing effect on the game world and stay in play until destroyed.
- Gods - Powerful deities from beyond, summoned to assist friendly forces or hinder the opposition. Gods typically have both a one-time effect and a continuous effect. Gods remain in play until destroyed, or until replaced with another god.

Additionally, all cards have a doom type associated with them, represented both by card color and a small icon. The dooms are: Corruption, Deceit, Destruction, and Greed.

== Card sources ==
The cards in Hecatomb draw from a variety of sources from ancient myth to the stories of H. P. Lovecraft, though some are generic creations of the designers of the game. Many cards are of the Lovecraftian ("Outsiders") and Aztec myth ("Aztecals") varieties.

== Reviews ==
- Rue Morgue #51
