= Mytheon =

2011 video game

- Developer: Petroglyph Games
- Publisher: NA: True Games
- Composer: Frank Klepacki
- Platform: Microsoft Windows
- Release: March 3, 2011
- Genre: Massively multiplayer online role-playing game
- Mode: Multiplayer

Mytheon was a free to play massively multiplayer online video game developed by Petroglyph Games. The game incorporated action, role-playing, and strategy elements. Players advanced through the game's Greek mythology-themed dungeons using a deck of collectible spells called power stones.

The game was released on March 3, 2011. After close to six months of operation, UTV True Games announced the shut down of the game servers on July 27, 2011. A reworked version, designed to allow for a single purchase instead, was released on Steam.
