= Panzer General: Russian Assault =

Board game

- Designers: Chuck Kroegel
- Publishers: Petroglyph Games
- Publication: August 9, 2010
- Genres: Strategy
- Series: Panzer General
- Players: Single-player, Multiplayer

Panzer General: Russian Assault is a board game developed by Petroglyph Games, sequel to Panzer General: Allied Assault that debuted in January 2010.

== Gameplay ==
Russian Assault is set in the closing months of World War II and has players play as Nazi Germany or the Soviet Union. Russian Assault is a turn-based game, where each turn is divided into three phases: Drawing cards, Operations, and Combat. At the beginning of his turn, the player draws 4 cards from his unit deck and/or the operations deck. The player can then spend prestige to deploy new units onto tiles controlled by them, move active units, play special operation cards, or engage enemy units on the board.

In combat, the attacking unit attacks first unless the defender is dug in. Players first compare their unit's combat stats and may then play operation cards to sway the battle in their favor or cancel combat completely. Finally, a player may choose to sacrifice any card in their hand for its combat value to boost their chances further. If the defending unit survives combat, it may counter-attack, which follows the same steps. Units may be forced to retreat if they receive more damage than the opposing unit at the end of a combat round. The victorious unit receives a morale boost and its owner may either receive half of the defeated unit's prestige or drain prestige from his opponent.

At the end of a turn, the player adds the prestige value of all tiles under his control and adds it to his reserve. To win the game, either player must meet the conditions laid out in the scenario's rules.

== Expansions and sequels ==
Panzer General: Russian Assault is the sequel to Panzer General: Allied Assault that debuted in January 2010.

== See also ==
- Moscow '41
