= 8-Bit Hordes =

2016 video game

- Developer: Petroglyph Games
- Publisher: Petroglyph Games
- Composer: Frank Klepacki
- Platform: Microsoft Windows
- Release: August 12, 2016
- Genre: Real-time strategy
- Modes: Single-player, multiplayer

8-Bit Hordes is a real-time strategy video game developed by Petroglyph Games, which was released on August 12, 2016, for Microsoft Windows. It uses the same engine as its predecessor 8-Bit Armies, but is now based in a fantasy themed scenario.

== Development ==
8-Bit Hordes is the sequel to the game 8-Bit Armies, which uses the same engine and interface. After the release of 8-Bit Armies, Petroglyph Games wanted to release more factions via DLC, but then decided to make an entire spin-off, which led to the release of 8-Bit Hordes a few months later on August 12, 2016. Due to their similarities, both games offer various crossover functionalities.

== Gameplay ==
8-Bit Hordes is a real-time strategy game designed to mirror the look and gameplay of classic RTS games of the 1990s. It features a single player campaign and a multiplayer mode in which players battle each other or the AI in the cooperative game mode. The game takes a simplistic approach in its gameplay and graphical elements. The graphics feature an 8-bit retro-art voxel style with partially destructible terrain. Gameplay is similar to the Warcraft franchise. The player starts with a castle which is used to expand the base and build military units to fight opponents. Resources are acquired via lorries that gather gold from nearby mines to the main castle. Units and buildings are constructed via a clickable menu on the right side of the screen, similar to the Command & Conquer franchise. The player must build farms to provide upkeep for their forces. The game is situated in a generic fantasy scenario featuring orcs, dwarfs, mages or dragon units. Featured in the game are two factions: the "good" Lightbringers and the "bad" Deathsworn.

The game also features cross-game multiplayer battles with 8-Bit Armies players, allowing them to play against each other with all factions from both games. This is also possible when the player only owns one of the two games.

== Reception ==
Reception

Review scores
| Publication | Score |
|---|---|
| GameStar | 6.8/10 |
| 4Players | 6.7/10 |

8-Bit Hordes was released digitally on Steam and GOG.com on August 12, 2016. Reviews of the game were mixed to positive. Reviewers acknowledged the game as a homage to the classic Command & Conquer franchise with a similar simplistic gameplay approach and a classic retro graphic style. The classic RTS gameplay has been praised as the core strength of the game. Some reviews criticized the lack of variety: the campaign features no distinctive storyline and the gameplay may feel repetitive, as simple aggressive rush tactics usually lead to a fast victory. The lopsided AI opponents that are just enough for warm-up play as well as bad pathfinding were also criticized. It has also been noted that the game is essentially a reskinned version of 8-Bit Armies, now with dragons instead of tanks. The soundtrack, which was composed by former Command & Conquer composer Frank Klepacki, has received positive reviews. Overall, reviews described the game as a nostalgic flashback that lacks variety and long-term playability, but still manages to be fun for a short while.
