= Battle Spirits =

2008 collectible card game

Battle Spirits Trading Card Game
- Battle Spirits 10th anniversary poster, featuring the protagonists from the anime series
- Designers: Mike Elliott
- Publishers: Bandai
- Players: 2 or 4
- Setup time: Approx 2 min
- Playing time: Approx 20 min
- Chance: Some
- Skills: Card playing Arithmetic; Basic Reading Ability; Strategy

Battle Spirits is a two-player collectible card game (CCG) jointly developed by Bandai and Sunrise, Inc. and a franchise which also includes several anime series, manga serialisations, and other merchandise like toys and video games.

The game was released in Japan in September 2008 where it quickly became one of the top selling trading card games of the year. Due to this popularity, it was released in the United States by Bandai of America on August 14, 2009. However, due to a lack of advertising and inaccurate translation from Japanese to English, only five sets were released.

The game is now only available in Asia and only printed in Japanese.

== How to Play ==
The game is set up by placing five core on each player's life and three on each player's reserve, plus 1 soul core. Each player draws four cards from their deck. The steps in a turn are as follows:

- Start Step: Signals the start of the first player's turn.
- Core Step: Take one core and add it to reserve. This step is skipped in the first turn.
- Draw Step: Draw one card from the deck.
- Refresh Step: Refresh all cards and take back cores from the trash (if any).
- Main Step: Summoning and levelling up spirits/braves/ultimates, using magic, placing burst cards (only one), deploying nexuses, and braving takes place during this step. No summoning, braving or moving core is allowed in other steps (except when stated by effects).
- Attack Step: This step is usually skipped in the first turn. Attacking takes place solely on this step. The steps are as follows:
  - Decide which spirit attacks. Only a card in refreshed position can attack or block, and is exhausted as soon as an attack or block is declared.
  - Flash timing: Magic or Swift Summon can be done at this time. The defender has the right to use magic first, but the (When Attacks) effects are first priority.
  - The opponent decides whether to block or take a life. If taking a life, the second Flash timing and the BP check are skipped.
  - Flash timing: Magic or Swift Summon can be done at this time. Again, the defender can use magic first.
  - Check BP. The card with higher BP wins, and the lower BP is destroyed. If the same amount, both are destroyed.
- End Step: Signals end of turn.

Repeat until game ends. The game is won by reducing either the opponent's life or deck to 0. The game is won immediately when the life is at 0, but a deck must have 0 cards during the Start Step for the game to end.

=== Card Terminology ===
- Core: Counters that are used to play cards and serve as life. When life is decreased, the core from the life goes to the reserve.
- Type: The type of card, whether a spirit, magic, nexus, brave, or ultimate.
- Color: The color of card, whether red, white, green, purple, yellow, or blue.
- Core Cost: The number of core that must be sent to the trash to play a card. Located on the top-left corner of the card.
- Core Reduction: For every card with a corresponding symbol on the field (up to a point), the core cost of playing a card is reduced by 1. Located directly to the right of the core cost.
- Battle Points: Abbreviated as BP, the attack/block power of a spirit, brave, or ultimate.
- Level Cost: The number of cores needed to raise a card to a certain level.
- Family: The classification of spirit, brave, and ultimate cards. Sometimes called attribute or characteristic. Located to the right of the card's name.
- Symbol: The gem at the bottom-right of the card. Used to determine card colour, core reduction, and damage the card can deal to the life. Most cards range from 0 to 2 symbols.

=== Card Types ===
- Spirit: Spirits are summoned mainly to attack the opponent and reduce their life but are also used to protect own life. They must have at least 1 core on them to stay on the field, and are levelled up by adding more core to them.
- Magic: Players use Magic to change the game field environment by causing a variety of different effects from providing BP boosts to drawing more cards. They can drastically change the pace of the game. Called "Spells" in the English release.
- Nexus: Nexuses are location cards that change the field. Their effects are similar to magic, but are continuous.
- Brave: A fourth type of card introduced about two years into the Japanese game's life when Battle Spirits Brave started. They are treated as "Spirit-Form" on field, means any Spirit-targeting effects are vulnerable to it. It can be 'Braved' onto Spirits like equipment, combining effects, attributes, symbol(if got any), and Cost. And Spirits with Brave are called "Braved Spirits". and in this form, Brave is Brave.
- Ultimate: A fifth type of card which was first introduced since Battle Spirits Ultimate (2013), whose level starts at 3 and can go up to 6. These cards have high BP for their cost. Ultimate s are unaffected by effects targeting spirits(it's different card Type), and usually have the summon condition fulfilled to summon them. Another specialty to Ultimate's are the effects called "Ultimate Trigger", "Ultimate Hand:X", and "Soul Drive" which are introduced in Card Mechanic section.

=== Card Rarity ===
The card rarity in Battle Spirits is as follows:

- Common: Cards are commonly obtainable with effects or no effect. But usually plays the role in supporting the deck structures.
- Uncommon: Cards with better effect. and this rarity is no longer exist after Battle Spirits Rekkaden.
- Rare: In the US version, they are all foiled cards except for starter rares. Costs range from 4–7. In Japanese version, their cost range varies.
- Master Rare: Foiled cards, much like rares. Costs range from 5–7. It became full art since Battle Spirits SwordEyes.
- X Rare: Special foil with an X in the effect box background. From Battle Spirits SwordEyes, the cards are in Full Art printed. They typically feature much more powerful effects than other tiers of rarity, mostly high costs.
- Mythic X Rare: Full Print Card with a BS in the effect box background. The sole Mythic X-Rare card is The AbsoluteDragonDeity Amaterasu-Dragon, with only three known copies in the world – Champion of Battle Spirits Championship 2013, Voice Actor of Tegamaru Taneshi (Jun Fukuyama) and Illustrator of AbsoluteDragonDeity Amaterasu-Dragon.
- Double X Rare: Very powerful cards introduced first in Battle Spirits Rekkaden . They have an XX in the effect box background. Cost varies
- Alternative Special Print X Rare: X rare with different print of art or foils. Since from Battle Spirits Brave, the cards are in Holographic special print until Battle Spirits Heroes first boosters, The DragonHero Sieg-Yamato-Fried. Unconfirmed it was due to community complain its visibility, Holographic print is then switched to Alternative Art after The DragonHero Sieg-Yamato-Fried (The last holographic print X rare). Again, until Battle Spirits SwordEyes ended, this rarity is no longer exist in next 3 seasons (3 years: Ultimate, Rekkaden, & Godking Saga). But, this rarity is again exist in Battle Spirits Kourinhen (no anime) with 2 attempts design. Alternative Special Print X rare in first 2 boosters(BS40&BS41) were printed simple by design of a black background which the spirits is sharp visible. In BS42 boosters, the Alternative Special Print X rares are printed with nice outline...and a mark of "Secret" stamp on it.
- 10th X Rare: Powerful cards commemorating the 10th anniversary of Battle Spirits. They have a "10th" printed on the card and the card art features gold details.

=== Colours ===
The Battle Spirits world is set with six colours; Red (Ruby), Green (Emerald), Purple (Amethyst), White (Diamond), Blue (Sapphire), and Yellow (Topaz). Each colour stems from a different variety of precious gem.

- Red: Red cards are mainly in aggressive effects that are activated when the player is attacking. It has many destructive effects that change the game situation drastically. One of the typical cards is “Flame Tempest”. It destroys all spirits with 3000BP or less. The Art for Red spirits are mostly based on Reptiles, Dragons, Dinosaurs and such.
- White: White cards are mainly defensive and many have effects that activate when they block. Even when the player have less spirits than opponent does, white spirits will protect player's Life with their strong defensive power. One of the typical cards is “Pure Elixir”. It refreshes all exhausted spirits. The Art for White cards are basically Robots or Mechas.
- Green: Green cards are good at generating cores in which they can give a player an early resource advantage in the game. An example is "Potion Berry". It enables the player to add a core to the reserve. And also it plays around the Refresh and Exhaust which enable them go for opponent's life. Green spirits are mostly based on Nature, Beasts, and insects.
- Purple: Purple cards are good at causing pain to the opponent outside of the battle. Purple is notorious for effects that play with the core layout of their opponent, like removing core from opposing Spirits in an attempt to deplete them. They also have many cards which enables the player to draw more. One of the typical cards is “The Shackles of Doom”. It prohibits spirits with only one core on them from attacking or blocking. Purple spirits are mostly based on death, demons, zombies, snakes and others.
- Blue: Blue cards mainly have the power to demolish opponent's deck, focusing on victory by deck out. They also have a high affinity with nexuses, which boost their effects or distract opponent's strategies. One card is "Magic Hammer", which allows the player to move the top 5 cards of the opponent's deck to their trash. Blue spirits are mostly based on the superhuman, Chimeras, Golems, and Myths.
- Yellow: Yellow cards are weak compared to other colours when looking at cost and BP, but have amazing effects that gives the player a powerful advantage when it comes to magic. Yellow is great at working with other colours to boost the power of their magic. And they have a lot of funny Battle Rule changing cards. Such as BP Matching becomes Level Matching or even treating its attack as if it wasn't blocked. Yellow spirits are mostly based on the divine, and... many cute creatures.

=== Card Mechanics ===
These are keywords that help identify a spirit's effect. All details for the special effects are printed on the cards.

Red's Specialty effects:

- Awaken [覚醒](Kakusei): Spirits with Awaken have the effect texts listed as follows: (Flash Step): Player may move any number of cores from other spirits player control to this spirit. This effect is in red.

- Ultra-Awaken [超覚醒](Chou Kakusei): A variation of Awaken where the spirit is refreshed each time cores are placed on it.

- True-Awaken [真覚醒]: A variation of Awaken specific to Ultimates where the ultimate gains 3000 BP for every core placed on it.

- Clash [激突]: Spirits with Clash have the effect texts as follows: (When Attacks): Opponent's spirits must block if possible. This effect is in red.

- True-Clash [真激突]: A variation of Clash where opposing spirits or ultimates must block if possible.

Green's Specialty effects:

- Swift [神速]: Spirits with Swift have the effect texts listed as follows: (Flash Step): This spirit may be summoned from the player's hand during the Flash Step. In that case, the cost of this spirit and cores to be put on this spirit must be paid or moved from the player's Reserve. This effect is in green.

- Violent Swift [烈神速]: A variation of Swift where the Core Cost is paid from the trash if there are 5 or more in it.

- Windstorm: X [暴風：X]: Spirits with Windstorm have the effect texts as follows: (When Attacks): Each time this spirit is blocked, opponent exhausts the specified number of unexhausted spirits they control. This effect is in green.
- Bunshin: X [分身:X]: Spirits with Bunshin have the effect texts listed as follows: Place up to X cards from the top of deck face down on field and by adding 1 or more cores from reserve onto them, during the game, those cards become "Cost 0, Family: Bunshin, <1>LV1 BP3000, Green" Bunshin spirits. Bunshin spirits cannot be braved and are discarded if sent back to the hand or deck. This effect is in green.

Purple Specialty effects

- Curse [呪撃]: Spirits with Curse have the effect texts listed as follows: (When Attacks): If this spirit is blocked, destroy the spirit that blocked this spirit at End of Battle Step. This effect is in purple.

- Destructive Curse [呪滅撃]: A variation of Curse where if the spirit is destroyed by the opponent at any time, by sending one of the opponent's life to their trash, the spirit remains on the field, refreshed.

- Immortality: X [不死：X]: Spirits with Immortality have the effect texts listed as follows: If this spirit is in the trash, player can summon it to the field when one of the player's spirits with cost X is destroyed. This effect is in purple.
- Poison Blade: X [毒刃：X]: Spirits with Poison Blade have the effect texts listed as follows: (When Battles): Place X cards from the top of opponent's deck underneath an opposing Spirit or Ultimate. The cards placed under the Spirit or Ultimate are discarded when it leaves the field.

White's Specialty effects

- Immunity: X [装甲：X]: Spirits with immunity will be not be affected by opposing Spirits, Magic and Nexus of the "X" colour. First and oldest effect of White's Special effect since first season.

- Heavy Immunity: X [重装甲：X]: A variation of Immunity where the spirit is also unaffected by opposing Brave effects. But it's still vulnerable to Ultimate's effects.

- Ultra-Immunity: X [超装甲：X]: A variation of Immunity where the spirit is also unaffected by opposing Ultimate effects. But it's vulnerable to Brave

- Ice Wall: X : Spirits with Ice Wall have the effect texts listed as follows: (Opponent's Turn): If an opponent plays a spell of X colour, by exhausting this spirit, negate that effect. This effect is in white.

Yellow's Specialty effects

- Brilliance: Spirits with Brilliance have the effect texts as follows: (When Attacks): During this battle, each time the player play's a spell card, at End of Battle Step, move that spell card from the Trash to the hand. This effect is in yellow.

- Evil Light: A variation of Brilliance where the spell's effect can be activated twice in the battle.

- Holy Life: Spirits with Holy Life have the effect texts as follows: (When Attacks): If this spirits deals damage to the opponent's life, move one core from the void to the player's life. This effect is in yellow.

- Divine Holy Life: A variation of Holy Life where one core is moved to the life when the spirit attacks, and it is refreshed if life is three or less.

- On Stage: Spirits with On Stage have the effect texts listed as follows: (Player's Attack Step): Instead of attacking with this Spirit, by returning this Spirit to the bottom of the deck, a Spirit card from the player's hand with name of "X" and in family "Stage Style" can be summoned without paying its cost, and draw 1 card from the player's deck.

Blue Specialty effects:

- Crush: Spirits with Crush have the effect texts listed as follows: (When Attacks): Move cards from the top of opponent’s Deck to their Trash equal to this spirit’s LV. This effect is in blue.

- Great Demolish: A variation of Crush where 5 cards are moved to the trash for every level that the spirit has.

- Assault: X: Spirits with Assault have the following effect: Assault: X (When Attacks): During this turn for the number of times stated above, player can exhaust one Nexus in order to refresh this Spirit. This effect is in blue.
- Summon Bolt: X: Spirits with Summon Bolt have the effect texts listed as follows: (When Battles): At the end of the battle, by destroying this Spirit, summon 1 cost X Spirit card in the same family as this Spirit from player's hand without paying its cost.

And the following are Effects for that season. These effects are not specialty to any colour. They are designed through the seasons.

- Tribute: Spirits with Tribute have the effect texts as follows: (Spirit with cost X or more) -> (location) [To Summon] As an additional cost to summon this spirit card, Player's must select a spirit to control that has cost X or more and move all cores from that spirit to the specified area. This effect is not limited to any colour.
- Burst: Spirits, ultimates, or magic which act as trap cards that activate when certain conditions are met, like "When the opponent takes the player's life" or "When the opponent uses Summon effects". After activating the burst effect, the player can summon the burst spirit at no cost, or can activate the main or flash effect of the burst magic by paying the cost. This effect is not limited to any colour.
- Charge: Charge is a special ability which premiered in SD10. Rather than being restricted to a particular colour, like most other special abilities, it is restricted to light spirits. Instead of being a standalone effect, Charge enhances other effects. The effect of charge is different for each colour.

- Red: Increase the BP limit of destruction effects by 1000.

- Purple: Increase the number of cores moved due to removal effects by 1.

- Green: Increase the number of opposing cards exhausted due to effects by 1

- White: Increase the number of spirits refreshed by effects by 1.

- Yellow: Increase BP- effects by −1000.

- Blue: Increase the cards moved from opponent's deck to their trash due to player's effects by 1.

- Rush: Rush is a special ability which premiered in SD11. Rather than being restricted to a particular colour, like most other special abilities, it is restricted to dark spirits. Rush encourages mixing colours, as it requires keeping a different colour symbol on the player's field to activate, designated on the card. Similarly to a nexus, for as long as the player have the conditions fulfilled, the rush effect remains active. The actual effect of rush varies from spirit to spirit.
- Draw Blade: Spirits with Draw Blade have the effect texts listed as follows: Player can summon 1 Brave card from the hand in the family "Exalted Sword" that can Brave Fuse with this Spirit, without paying the cost. This effect is not limited to any colour.
- Ultimate Trigger: An effect specific to Ultimates which premiered in SD19. When the Ultimate Trigger activates, the opponent moves one card from their deck to the trash. If the core cost of the card is lower than the Ultimate, this is referred to as a Hit and a special effect activates. If the core cost of the card is equal to or higher than the Ultimate, this is referred to as a Guard and the special effect does not activate.

- Critical Hit: If the card sent to the trash fulfils a certain condition, another effect may activate.

- Double Ultimate Trigger: Two cards are sent to the trash instead of one. If both cards hit, another effect may activate.

- Spirit Soul: X: Spirit Soul is a special ability which premiered in BS24. When summoning an Ultimate, a spirit with Spirit Soul gains an extra symbol of X color, which can be used for cost reduction.

- Trigger Counter: An effect of braves or spells that activates when the opponent's Ultimate Trigger hits. The effect can only be activated when the card is in the hand, and cannot be used when on the field. Braves with Trigger Counter are summoned immediately before their effect takes place.
- Ultimate Energy: An effect of Ultimates which allows all other Ultimates on the player's field in specific families to gain 1 symbol of a designated colour.
- Ultimate-Hand: X: An effect of Ultimates which allows the player to activate a Burst of X colour from their hand when its condition is fulfilled.

== English Set Releases ==
A player must have at least 50 cards in their deck, with no more than 60 cards. Up to three cards of the same name are allowed in a deck. Players can purchase booster packs to increase the number of cards they have. Expansions are sets of cards that build upon the foundation laid out by the base set, the original set of cards released.

- BS-01 Call of the Core (released 08/14/09): The base set that introduced the original four colours Red, Purple, Green and White.
- BS-02 Rise of the Angels (released 11/13/09): This set introduces the new colour Yellow as well additional support for the original four colours.
- BS-03 Scars of Battle (released 02/05/10): This set introduced the next new colour Blue, completing the six colours of Battle Spirits so far.
- BS-04 Ascension of Dragons (released 05/07/10): This set focuses on dragons and new two gem Spirits. When these Spirits deal damage they take two life from the opponent instead of one. Unlike the previous three sets released in North America, it contained not only cards from Japanese series 4, but around half of series 5 as well. This was intended to be a means of eventually catching up to the Japanese version of the game.
- BS-05 Dawn of the Ancients: (released 09/10/2010): This set introduced two new effect keywords: Rage and Windstorm and included the first dual-colour Spirits. As was the case with series 4, the English edition of BS-05 contained additional cards; in this case the rest of Japanese series 5 and half of Japanese series 6.

There are currently a total of 40+ expansion sets and more than 30 starter decks available in Japan, as well as numerous other special sets and promotional cards. Special crossover cards even exist, such as those from Toho's Godzilla franchise.

== Media ==
=== Anime ===
There are 299 episodes in the first six completed series. Each anime also has a manga serialisation.

1. Battle Spirits: Shounen Toppa Bashin (2008–2009)
2. Battle Spirits: Shounen Gekiha Dan (ja:バトルスピリッツ 少年激覇ダン) (2009–2010)
3. Battle Spirits: Brave (ja:バトルスピリッツ ブレイヴ, Batorusupirittsu bureivu) (2010–2011)
4. Battle Spirits: Heroes (ja:バトルスピリッツ 覇王, Batorusupirittsu haō) (2011–2012)
5. Battle Spirits: Sword Eyes (2012–2013)
6. Battle Spirits: Saikyou Ginga Ultimate Zero (2013–2014)
7. Battle Spirits: Burning Soul (ja:バトルスピリッツ 烈火魂, Batorusupirittsu baningusouru) (2015–2016)
8. Battle Spirits Double Drive (ja:バトルスピリッツ ダブルドライブ) (2016–2017)
9. Battle Spirits: Saga Brave (ja:バトルスピリッツ サーガブレイヴ) (2019)
10. Battle Spirits: Kakumei no Galette (2020)
11. Battle Spirits: Mirage (2021)
12. Battle Spirits Re Zekkai no Kū (ja:Battle Spirits［Re］絶界の空) (2026)

=== Video games ===
There have been six video games released to date. Only Battle Spirits Crossover has released outside of Japan, however, the international versions only support Japanese language options.

1. Battle Spirits: Kiseki no Hasha (2009) was made for the PlayStation Portable.
2. Battle Spirits: Digital Starter (2010) was made for the Nintendo DS.
3. Battle Spirits: Heroes Soul (2010) was made for the PlayStation Portable.
4. Battle Spirits: Samurai Championship (2012) was made by Mobage for iOS and Android.
5. Battle Spirits: Connected Battlers (2022) was made by FuRyu for Nintendo Switch and PlayStation 4.
6. Battle Spirits Crossover (2024) was made by FuRyu for Microsoft Windows, Nintendo Switch, and PlayStation 5. It was released internationally in 2026 only on Nintendo Switch 2.
