= 8-Bit Armies =

2016 video game

- Developer: Petroglyph Games
- Publisher: Petroglyph Games
- Composer: Frank Klepacki
- Platforms: Microsoft Windows, PlayStation 4, Xbox One
- Release: Microsoft Windows; April 22, 2016; PlayStation 4, Xbox One; 21 September 2018
- Genre: Real-time strategy
- Modes: Single-player, multiplayer

8-Bit Armies is a real-time strategy video game developed by Petroglyph Games, which was released on April 22, 2016 for Microsoft Windows and for Xbox One, and PlayStation 4 on 21 September 2018.

== Gameplay ==
8-Bit Armies is a real time strategy game designed to mirror the look and gameplay of classic RTS games. It features a singleplayer campaign and a multiplayer mode in which players battle each other or the AI in the cooperative game mode. The game takes a very simplistic approach in its gameplay and graphical elements. The graphic features a blocky 8-bit retro-art voxel style with partially destructible terrain. Gameplay is very similar to the classic Command & Conquer franchise, many of the original developers of which work for Petroglyph Games. The player starts with a headquarter building which they use to expand their base so they can build various military units to fight their opponents. Resources are gathered via oil trucks and refineries. Units and buildings are built via a clickable menu on the right side of the screen. The game is situated in a contemporary scenario featuring generic tank, artillery or rocket units. At the release of the game, only one faction was playable, but Petroglyph Games announced that they planned to release more factions later on.

On August 28, 2016 Petroglyph Games released 2 free DLCs for the game: one for the 2nd faction called 'Guardian' and one for a new campaign which includes the new faction.

In the same month Petroglyph Games also released a spin-off to the original games, called 8-Bit Hordes. It uses the same engine as 8-Bit Armies but features a fantasy-themed scenario. A second spin-off, called 8-Bit Invaders was also released and featured a science-fiction-themed scenario with a high-tech human and an alien faction. The game also features cross game multiplayer battles, allowing players to play against each other with all factions from all three games.

== Release and reception ==
Reception

Review scores
Publication	Score
PC Games	6.8/10
4Players	6.5/10

8-Bit Armies was released digitally on April 22, 2016 on Steam as well as GOG.com. The reception of the game was mixed to positive. Reviewers acknowledged the game as a homage to the classic Command & Conquer franchise, with a similar simplistic gameplay approach and a classic retro graphic style. The classic RTS gameplay has been praised as the core strength of the game. Some reviews criticised the lack of variety: only one faction is playable, the campaign features no distinctive story line and the gameplay may feel repetitive. The soundtrack, which has been composed by former Command & Conquer composer Frank Klepacki, has been noted positively. As conclusion, reviews described the game as a nostalgic flashback which falls short in variety and long-time motivation.
