= Last Night on Earth: Growing Hunger =

2008 board game expansion

Last Night on Earth: Growing Hunger is a 2008 board game supplement published by Flying Frog Productions for Last Night on Earth.

== Contents ==
Last Night on Earth: Growing Hunger is a supplement in which new scenarios expand the game, with modular town layouts, and fast, cooperative survival gameplay that pits heroes against relentless zombies.

== Reviews ==
- Pyramid
- Rue Morgue #80
