= Harry Potter Trading Card Game =

Collectible trading card game

- Harry Potter Trading Card Game's card back design
- Designers: Paul Peterson; Skaff Elias; Mike Elliott
- Publishers: Wizards of the Coast
- Players: 2
- Playing time: ~20 minutes
- Chance: Some
- Skills: Card playing Arithmetic; Reading; Logic

The Harry Potter Trading Card Game is an out-of-print collectible card game based in the world of J. K. Rowling's Harry Potter novels. Created by Wizards of the Coast in August 2001, the game was designed to compete with the Yu-Gi-Oh!, Pokémon and Magic: The Gathering card games. Its release was timed to coincide with the theatrical premiere of the first film in the series. The game was praised for the way it immersed children in the Harry Potter universe. At one point the game was the second best selling toy in the United States; however, it is now out of print.

== Game play ==
The game is for two players, each with 60-card decks (with the addition of a starting Character; see below). The aim is to force the opposite player to run out of cards from their deck first. When cards do "damage" to a player, cards from the deck are placed into the discard pile. Each player begins with a hand of seven cards, and draws a card before each of their turns.

=== Types of cards ===
There are eight different types of cards in the Harry Potter Trading Card Game.

- Lessons are the basic units of the game. Each provides 1 "Power", which is needed to play other cards. The number of Lessons in play determines the player's capabilities to play cards with different costs. There are five different Lesson cards, each of which has a different symbol and colour that is used to identify it on other cards.
- Spells are cards that are played directly into the discard pile and have a given effect. They have a printed Power cost; there are Spells for each Lesson type.
- Creatures stay on the table when played. All Creatures have a printed Power cost, and require Care of Magical Creatures Lessons to play. They have a Health number that determines how much damage they can take, and a "Damage each turn" number that dictates the amount of damage done to the opposing player each turn. Not all Creatures do damage; some have special abilities.
- Characters do not have a printed Power cost or Lesson type and thus do not require Lessons to play, although they do require two Actions. Characters stay on the table and have special abilities that can be used by the player; some also provide Power. Each player must have a starting Character to represent them: the starting Character begins the game on the table and cannot be discarded from play. Only Characters with the "Witch" or "Wizard" keyword designation can be used as starting Characters.
- Adventures, like Characters, do not require Lessons to play, and require two Actions. They have an Effect on the opposing player; a "To Solve" condition that must be accomplished for the opposing player to remove the Adventure; and a Reward, which the opposing player receives when they have solved the Adventure. Each player can have only one Adventure in play at a time.
- Items stay on the table when played. They have a printed Power cost and can be of any Lesson type. Some have effects that can be used, while others provide extra Power.
- Matches were introduced in the Quidditch Cup expansion. They all have a printed Power cost of one, requiring Quidditch Power. They have a condition "To Win", and a "Prize" for the first player to fulfill that condition. Only one Match is allowed in play at one time.
- Locations were introduced in the Diagon Alley expansion. They have a printed Power cost and can be of any Lesson type. Locations have the same effect on both players. There can be only one Location in play at any one time; playing a Location removes any previous Locations from play.

=== Lesson types ===
There are five Lesson types in the game, each applying to different cards. There is no limit on the Lesson cards in a player's deck: a player may have as many different types as they prefer.

- Care of Magical Creatures (brown) is mostly used for Creature cards, although there are also a small number of Spells, Items and Locations requiring this Lesson. Care of Magical Creatures focus mainly on dealing damage.
- Charms (blue) can be used for Spells, Items and Locations. Charms specialises in low but versatile damage and some other effects, such as locating cards from a player's deck.
- Potions (green) can be used for Spells, Items and Locations. Potions cards are often very powerful and require comparatively low Power costs, although they usually require a sacrifice of a certain number of Lessons.
- Quidditch (yellow) can be used for Spells, Items, Locations and Matches. This Lesson type was introduced in the Quidditch Cup expansion, and specialises in cards that have two effects at once.
- Transfiguration (red) can be used for Spells, Items and Locations. These cards specialise in the removal of Creatures, Lessons and other cards from play while not directly damaging the opposition.

=== Keywords ===
Some cards have keywords in addition to their card type. These keywords allow other cards to refer to a specific type of card. The "Wizard" or "Witch" designation on Character cards is an example of a keyword, as is the "Healing" designation on some other cards. Other common keywords include designations representing each of the four Hogwarts houses: Gryffindor, Ravenclaw, Hufflepuff, and Slytherin.

Some cards (including all Characters) have the keyword "Unique", which indicates that only one of them can be in play at a time (for either player). The only exception is if both players have the same starting Character.

== History ==
=== Card sets ===
The expansions are represented by a symbol on each card.

The first set of cards, commonly called the base set, was introduced in August 2001. Following the 116-card base set release, four expansion sets were introduced. The first three expansions each consist of 80 cards plus 30 Foil or Hologram Portrait Premium rares. These expansions include Quidditch Cup (November 2001), Diagon Alley (March 2002), and Adventures at Hogwarts (June 2002). Notable differences in these expansions include the addition of the Quidditch lesson type and Match cards introduced in the Quidditch Cup expansion, location cards introduced in the Diagon Alley expansion, and a larger pool of adventure cards in the Adventures at Hogwarts expansion. The fourth and final expansion released was Chamber of Secrets, which has 140 cards plus 55 Foil or Hologram Portrait Premium rares (October 2002). This last expansion features cards based on the Chamber of Secrets book, where all previous cards were based on the Sorcerer's Stone book.

From its inception in 2001 through 2003, the Harry Potter Trading Card Game had several gaming leagues formed. After releasing the last expansion set in 2003, Wizards of the Coast discontinued making HPTCG cards.

=== Card value ===
Each card has its own specific value, the most valuable being "rare" and the least being "common". The value of a card is shown by a symbol at the bottom right of the card, followed by the expansion set symbol and set number. A circle means that the card is common, and therefore not very valuable; a diamond means the card is uncommon, so the card has a bit of value; and a star means the card is rare, and is more valuable.

There are also cards of more value than "rare" cards: foils and holofoils. "Foil premium" cards are partially "shiny", having thunderbolts and stars as theme for the "additional covering". These are normally rare cards, but common and uncommon foils do exist. "Holo-portraits premium", (colloquially "holofoil") are the most rare and the most valuable of all types of cards. These cards are only available for "character" cards, which have the portrait of the character on them (origin of name). They are similar to foils, except that the picture of the character has a holographic quality that gives the impression of "popping out".

Given the variety of card values, single cards have a price range of $0.05–15.00.

=== Card availability ===
The cards from this game are sold in three ways: booster packs, starter decks, and theme decks. Booster packs were released for every set. Each pack contains eleven cards, which includes one rare card, two uncommon cards, six common cards, and two Lessons. If a premium card was included in a base set booster pack, it replaced the rare card. In the expansions, a premium card replaced one of the common cards.

Starter decks were made with the Base set, Diagon Alley set, and the Chamber of Secrets set. Each included two introductory decks of 40 cards, a playmat, additional instructions and two premium cards. Theme decks, a special kind of starter pack, were released to the public with the Chamber of Secrets set. These decks are the Percy Weasley Potions deck and the Twin Trouble deck. Included in each was a full 60-card deck, playable right out of the box. The packaging for two additional theme decks (Hannah Abbott's Spellcaster and Dean Thomas' Restrike) was made for a toy fair in 2001, but the products were never produced.

=== Playing online ===
Virtual card games LackeyCCG and Apprentice allow for online play.

=== Lawsuit ===
In 2002, Wizards of the Coast filed a lawsuit against former vice president of operations Charles Federline, alleging that he cost the company more than $93,000 by undermining the bidding process for the print work for the cards.

=== Revival ===
Since 2015, there have been unofficial yearly tournaments at the Gen Con.
