= Universe at War: Earth Assault =

2007 video game

- North American Windows version box art
- Developer: Petroglyph Games
- Publisher: Sega
- Composer: Frank Klepacki
- Engine: Alamo
- Platforms: Microsoft Windows, Xbox 360
- Release: Windows: NA: December 10, 2007; EU: January 25, 2008; AU: February 7, 2008; Xbox 360: NA: March 25, 2008; AU: March 27, 2008; EU: March 28, 2008
- Genre: Real-time strategy
- Modes: Single player, multiplayer

Universe at War: Earth Assault is a real-time strategy game, developed by Petroglyph Games and published by Sega. Universe at War: Earth Assault was intended to be the first game in a planned series of games to be called the Universe at War series.

On May 10, 2007, Sega announced that the title was also in development for the Xbox 360, which was released in 2008. Further, on June 27, 2007, Sega announced that the title would allow cross platform multiplayer through Xbox Live and Games for Windows – Live services.

== Plot ==
Universe at War: Earth Assault, begins during the year 2012 when an alien species known as the Hierarchy lands on Earth to strip mine the planet. Before their arrival, observatories and scientists on Earth gave warning of aliens, but the human race, as a whole, is not able to organize a unified military front against the alien forces. Because the Hierarchy has vast military experience from invading and destroying other planets in the universe, the human race is not able to withstand their forces.

The Novus (a race of machines who fight the Hierarchy to avenge their fallen creators) arrive just in time to save Washington, D.C. where the U.S. military has made its last stand. They then proceed to establish bases, using guerrilla tactics to harass the Hierarchy while investigating why the Hierarchy has delayed in using their ultimate weapon "the Purifier", to utterly eradicate all life on Earth and proceed to strip mine the planet. Over the course of these missions the Novus field commander Mirabel, a cloned member of Novus' creator species, manages to befriend the human General Randal Moore, who is in charge of leading what's left of the US forces after the initial Hierarchy invasion, and together they are able to launch an attack on a Hierarchy Material Conduit and use it to enable Mirabel to board one of their command ships, learning that Kamal Re'x, the overseer in charge of the Hierarchy forces on Earth has purposefully delayed the Purifier's activation in order to use it to destroy the Novus forces when they arrive on Earth before scuttling the command ship to kill Mirabel. She manages to escape from the crashing ship but is unable to warn the Novus forces before they launch an attack on the Novus command base, damaging the portal that Novus were planning to use to return to Earth and forcing the Novus leader, known only as the Founder, to sacrifice himself to prevent it from exploding and destroying what's left of the Novus forces.

With the Novus portal destroyed and their forces scattered, Kamal gives the order for the Purifier to be primed for activation; however, while distracting the Novus from the Purifier, Hierarchy field commander Orlok accidentally trips an ancient alarm in the Egyptian pyramids, and the Masari, asleep beneath the Earth's oceans, begin to waken. Although the Masari mothership initially creates a signal that prevents the Purifier from being used, the Hierarchy bombards the ship from orbit and Orlok boards it to destroy the jamming signal transmitters.

Orlok, who has been questioning Kamal's intentions, prepares to separate from the others who follow him. Nufai, a spy working for Kamal, used to be part of a species that the Hierarchy has since eliminated. He tells Orlok that he would be happy to overthrow Kamal's regime, so Nufai is sent to secure the Purifier while Orlok tries to forge an alliance with the Masari queen, but instead finds her son, Prince Zessus. The prince and his forces join Orlok as he tries to capture a communication center to contact the others who want to separate from the Hierarchy. But Kamal Re'x appears with a massive force of troops, and Orlok almost defeats him, but Nufai shows up and helps Kamal destroy Orlok, revealing that he was working for Kamal the entire time. Nufai is appointed commander, and they begin to use the Purifier to destroy Earth. Prince Zessus is captured but is freed by a soldier who managed to escape. They find more humans, which includes General Moore, captured in other encampments and join forces with them.

Meanwhile, the Masari Queen is concerned about her son and the fate of the planet. The Masari are furious when they awoke only to find their enemy, the Hierarchy, present on Earth, and their mothership destroyed, along with the fact that their plan for humanity to become a powerful force to oppose the Hierarchy is in jeopardy. As such, the Masari have no allegiance and are prepared to destroy any of the other factions to reap revenge on those who destroyed their civilization and their adopted home. Then, Novus approaches the queen and offers another allegiance, which the queen accepts. The two armies then assault all the Hierarchy bases on Earth. When they arrive in South America, they find Zessus, who announces that he has befriended the humans. Finally, the combined armies of the Masari, Novus, and the humans attack and destroy the Purifier. Kamal Re'x is outraged and attempts to destroy them by himself, which instantly fails.

The armies argue over what to do with Kamal, with the humans and Novus wanting to kill him for the damage he caused to the galaxy and Earth. But the Masari queen says that death is not the answer. She then apparently gives Kamal the power of a god, which he uses to destroy them all, at least in his eyes. The queen is revealed to have actually trapped Kamal inside his own mind, where he visualizes himself conquering the galaxy, but is never able to accomplish it himself. He is locked in the prison of his own mind, forever.

== Gameplay ==
Gameplay is split between three modes, two of which are further divided into different game types.

The first mode is single player. These are games that are played exclusively by one human player against AI-controlled opponents. This mode contains the campaign and scenario game types. In Campaign, the player controls one of the four factions, depending on which part of the campaign is being played, and plays through various battles, accomplishing predetermined objectives to progress along the storyline and eventually "beat" the game.

Scenario mode gives the player a choice of one of the three main factions (Novus, the Hierarchy, or the Masari) and then allows the player to choose a global situation and take over the world. This mode is split between global strategy, which involves attacking neutral or enemy territories, constructing global structures, and collecting resources; and tactical combat, in which the player must attack an enemy in an occupied territory in order to gain control of it, or defend one of their territories from an attempted invasion.

The second mode is the standard RTS skirmish mode. The player is given the option of playing against up to three opponents on the Xbox 360 or seven opponents on the PC. These opponents can be either AI-controlled or human-controlled over an internet connection. The players are each given a base and a construction unit and must build up their forces to achieve domination of the chosen game map.

== Audio ==
The Universe at War: Earth Assault Original Soundtrack was composed by Frank Klepacki and released on December 22, 2007.

== Reception ==
Reception

Aggregate score
Aggregator	Score	
Aggregator	PC	Xbox 360
Metacritic	77/100	66/100

Review scores
Publication	Score	
Publication	PC	Xbox 360
Destructoid	N/A	4/10
Edge	6/10	N/A
Eurogamer	7/10	4/10
Game Informer	8.25/10	5/10
GamePro	4/5	N/A
GameRevolution	B−	N/A
GameSpot	7.5/10	6.5/10
GameSpy	3.5/5	3/5
GameTrailers	N/A	7.5/10
GameZone	8/10	7.2/10
IGN	8/10	6.3/10
Official Xbox Magazine (US)	N/A	7.5/10
PC Gamer (US)	85%	N/A
PC PowerPlay	8/10	N/A
The New York Times	(favorable)	N/A

The PC version received "generally favorable reviews", while the Xbox 360 version received "average" reviews, according to the review aggregation website Metacritic. GamePro described the PC version "like a breath of fresh air that carries with it the vague stench of something foul. It offers three interesting and diverse sides, great graphics, and some tantalizing strategic elements but it's afflicted by some unfortunate quirks that hold the game back." IGN remarked of the same console version, "What Petroglyph has done is to take the basic framework and use it to create a game with three wildly unique but finely balanced factions that each offer a level of real-time customization that gives players a chance to really adapt to the changing circumstances on the battlefield. Unfortunately, the game's campaign doesn't do justice to the overall design while a number of sticky interface and performance problems add to the frustrations."

=== Awards ===
- ActionTrip: Best strategy game of E3 2007.
- Kotaku: Best strategy game of E3 2007.
- CHUD: Sixth of Best of E3 2007, also the number one strategy game on the top ten list.
- Game Critics Awards nominee.
- Number 9 on IGN PC Editor's list of most anticipated games.
