= Panzer General: Allied Assault =

2009 video game

- Developer(s): Petroglyph Games
- Publisher(s): Ubisoft
- Designer(s): Chuck Kroegel
- Composer(s): Frank Klepacki
- Series: Panzer General
- Platform(s): Xbox 360 (XBLA)
- Release: October 21, 2009
- Genre(s): Strategy
- Mode(s): Single-player, Multiplayer

Panzer General: Allied Assault is the name of both a digital and board/card game developed by Petroglyph Games. The Xbox Live Arcade version was released on October 21, 2009 and the board game on January 5, 2010.

== Gameplay ==
Allied Assault is set in the closing months of World War II and has players play as Nazi Germany or the United States. Allied Assault is a turn-based game, where each turn is divided into three phases: Drawing cards, Operations, and Combat. At the beginning of his turn, the player draws 4 cards from his unit deck and/or the operations deck (in the XBLA version, this is done automatically). The player can then spend prestige to deploy new units onto tiles controlled by them, move active units, play special operation cards, or engage enemy units on the board.

In combat, the attacking unit attacks first unless the defender is dug in. Players first compare their unit's combat stats and may then play operation cards to sway the battle in their favor or cancel combat completely. Finally, a player may choose to sacrifice any card in their hand for its combat value to boost their chances further. If the defending unit survives combat, it may counter-attack, which follows the same steps. Units may be forced to retreat if they receive more damage than the opposing unit at the end of a combat round. The victorious unit receives a morale boost and its owner may either receive half of the defeated unit's prestige or drain prestige from his opponent.

At the end of a turn, the player adds the prestige value of all tiles under his control and adds it to his reserve. To win the game, either player must meet the conditions laid out in the scenario's rules.

The XBLA version features a single-player campaign following the United States, whereas the board game features stand-alone solo scenarios.

== Development ==
The soundtrack for the XBLA version of the game was composed by Frank Klepacki. On November 30, 2009, Petroglyph released it as a free download on their website.

== Sequel ==
Panzer General: Russian Assault was announced in the first half of 2010 and released in August 2010.
