= Grey Goo =

Science fiction RTS video game

- Developer: Petroglyph Games
- Publisher: Grey Box
- Producer: Six Foot
- Designer: Andrew Zoboki
- Composer: Frank Klepacki
- Engine: GlyphX
- Platform: Microsoft Windows
- Release: January 23, 2015
- Genre: Real-time strategy
- Modes: Single-player, multiplayer

Grey Goo is a science fiction real-time strategy video game developed by Petroglyph Games, produced by Six Foot, and published by Grey Box on January 23, 2015 exclusively for PC Microsoft Windows. It features a playable faction based on the grey goo scenario.

== Gameplay ==
In Grey Goo players can choose one of four playable factions, the Humans, the Beta, the Goo, or the Shroud and use them to complete a single-player campaign or play in a competitive multiplayer mode versus other players. Each faction features a unique set of units, structures, and play style as well as its own segment of the single-player campaign. The Beta faction relies on speed, mobility, and power to dominate the battle through battle machines and specific units able to mount themselves on "hard-points" for defense. The human faction is well-rounded and highly based on reconfiguration of their base. They possess teleportation technology, able to reconfigure their sentinels and other structures and also transport their units to anywhere on the battlefield. The Goo faction features the game's namesake, self replicating nanobots that can move around the map consuming enemies and forming themselves into new units. Due to this, they only rely on pure strength and speed to destroy anything in their way. The Shroud faction is the main antagonist of the universe, using strong but flimsy units to dominate with pure firepower. The game bases itself around "macro decisions over micro management" and features a qwert hotkey system for unit control and construction. Also, maps feature terrain obstructing vision similar to games such as DotA and League of Legends.

== Plot ==
The story takes place 500 years after humans first ventured outside of the Solar System. The Beta (or Mora, as they call themselves), a once-spacefaring culture, has fled with the remainder of their civilization to Ecosystem 9 (which they call Falkannan), the planet the game takes place on, from an unknown threat they call the Silent Ones. During a test firing of the wormhole they meant to use to return to the stars, they are attacked by enemies coming through the portal, or "Keyhole". These advanced drone units are first suspected to belong to the Silent Ones but are later revealed to be human in origin. As the conflict between the Beta settlers, led by Aran (Commander) Saruk, and the human forces intensifies, an explosion in orbit scatters wreckage all over their colony, from which the Goo emerge and attack both sides.

After a long history of war and exploration in space, during which no intelligent life was found, humans had returned to planet Earth in an attempt to seek peace and stability in a post-scarcity society guided by AI. A signal is detected from the distant planet Ecosystem 9 in the outer Crux Arm, and the starship LSV Darwin, captained by Lucy Tak, is sent to investigate. Landing forces are engaged by the Beta (who are designated as such by the humans because their original planet was the "beta candidate" for intelligent life during previous radio telescope surveys, but subsequent investigation did not receive any more signals — likely a consequence of the Silent Ones' attack) and collect samples from the surface, including Goo, which promptly escapes and destroys the Darwin, reaching the Beta colony site in the re-entering wreckage. Despite their initial conflict, the Beta and the now-stranded humans agree to an alliance to destroy the Goo that threatens them, which is revealed to be part of the artificially intelligent "Pathfinder" Von Neumann probe system sent from Earth centuries prior to chart the galaxy in advance of the human expansion. The probes were believed to have been decommissioned when exploration was abandoned, but presumably the Goo on Ecosystem 9 somehow altered its own programming, becoming self-directing.

After sacrificing himself to destroy what was believed to be the last Goo on the planet, the robotic human commander Singleton's consciousness merges with the Goo. It is revealed that the Goo are attempting not to consume life, but rather to protect it from "the growing shroud of Silence" that is expanding across the galaxy — the same unknown force that destroyed the Beta civilization. All previous hostile actions were merely attempts to expand in order to effectively defend the planet. With Singleton's assistance, the Goo fights back from the brink of extinction and carves a path to the Beta's Keyhole device in the hope of contacting and reuniting with the scattered Goo across the galaxy, to stand united against the Silence. Singleton attempts to negotiate with the Humans and Beta, but the Goo is forced to destroy the opposing armies. Defeated, Saruk, Tak and others who were spared watch as countless Goo masses emerge from Keyholes across the planet. In an after-credits scene it is hinted that the "growing silence" has discovered Ecosystem 9.

In the 'Descent of the Shroud' update, the "growing silence" was revealed as the newly added fourth playable faction, the Shroud.

== Release ==
Grey Goo was originally announced on March 13, 2014, with a release slated for fall 2014. This date was pushed back, and the game was released on January 23, 2015.

The DLC pack Emergence, containing three new single player missions, was released on June 11, 2015. The missions are centered on the robotic human commander Singleton, and how he became the guiding consciousness of the Goo following the events of the main human campaign.

The DLC pack The Descent of the Shroud, containing new single player missions, was released on February 1, 2016. The missions are set months after the game finishes, where it introduces a new faction, The Shroud, also called The Silent Ones.

== Reception ==
Reception

Aggregate score
Aggregator	Score
Metacritic	77/100

Review scores
Publication	Score
GameSpot	8/10
IGN	7,6/10
PC Gamer (US)	82/100
Hardcore Gamer	4/5
HonestGamers	8/10
Metro	7/10
GameWatcher	8/10

Hardcore Gamer gave the game four out of five, stating: "Grey Goo is a stand-out RTS that has found an expert way of blending old with new to create something familiar but fresh. Fans of old-school real-time strategy classics such as Command & Conquer will find much to love here". HonestGamers gave the game an eight out of ten, opining that it is "a reinvention of how RTS games used to be, looking back on that time when you'd send harvesters out to collect spice and hoped to hell a sandworm didn't eat the bloody thing, or when you geared up to take on that one bald guy from Nod. Just in this case, the production values have been ramped up, and it hates you just a little bit more". GameWatcher scored it 8.0, saying that Grey Goo is "probably Petroglyph's best game (especially if you're not a Star Wars fan), it won't steal the RTS crown from Blizzard or Creative Assembly but if you want a straight fun strategy you won't regret being absorbed by Grey Goo".

During the 19th Annual D.I.C.E. Awards, the Academy of Interactive Arts & Sciences nominated Grey Goo for "Strategy/Simulation Game of the Year".
