= Times Tables Rock Stars =

Education maths application and website

- TT Rockstars logo
- Developer: Bruno Reddy
- Publisher: Maths Circle Ltd
- Release: 2010
- Genre: Educational

Times Tables Rock Stars (also known as TT Rockstars) is a Bedford-based educational maths application and website created by Bruno Reddy and Maths Circle Ltd that focuses on GCSE level maths.

== History ==
Times Tables Rock Stars was created in 2010 by Bruno Reddy, a secondary school maths teacher. Reddy wore a wig, and played rock music while holding a blow-up guitar at the beginning of his lessons, in which he encouraged his pupils to answer quick-fire maths questions. Reddy launched the application to help his pupils increase their speed answering questions about times tables.

== Gameplay ==
The gameplay of Times Tables Rock Stars consists of players going up the ranks as a rockstar by answering multiplication and division questions

Gameplay consists of answering as many multiplication and division questions as possible in a specific amount of time. Players also make their own rock star names and avatars for use in-game. Players earn points for the number of questions they answer, which they can then spend on new clothing items and accessories for their avatar.

Leaderboards are based on every school in a specific area. Two classes in the same school can compete against each other in "Battle of the Bands" competitions where each class tries to answer more questions in total than the other class. The application also hosts several nationwide maths competitions where every school in a certain location competes against each other; Oz Rocks for Australia, Ireland Rocks for the island of Ireland as part of the 20th annual Maths Week Ireland, South Island Rocks for the South Island of New Zealand, North Island Rocks for the North Island of New Zealand, Scotland Rocks for Scotland, England Rocks for England, London Rocks for London, Cardiff Rocks for Cardiff, Wales Rocks for Wales, NSPCC Rocks for all of the UK as part of NSPCC Numbers Day, UAE rocks for the United Arab Emirates, Qatar Rocks for Qatar, Melbourne Rocks for Melbourne and Rest of the World Rocks for the Rest of the World.

== Reception ==
Several schools dressed up in costumes inspired by Times Tables Rock Stars after their school gained access to the application. One primary school in Hambridge declared February 20 as Times Tables Rock Stars and Numbots day. Several schools described the application as world renowned. An article in The Guardian stated that the idea seemed counterintuitive, easy to mock and a rather gimmicky approach but also called the idea a success due to the creator's past experience as a former head of maths while being wary of "the way in which various approaches to education can be taken up on a large scale despite schools not necessarily knowing whether they’re actually helping students." The Times stated that "The Tories are proposing that children be allowed to opt out of screen-based learning amid fears devices are being used too much in schools" citing Times Tables Rock Stars, Duolingo, Spelling Shed, Kahoot, Seneca and Quizlet as examples of popular educational technology programs that parents weren't able to opt out of.

When Broadwood Primary School in Denton Burn gained access to the application, the pupils at the school were confused as to why they weren't able to equip cochlear implants on their avatars when there were already hearing aids in-game. When contacted about the issue, the developers added cochlear implants to the game.

== Guinness World Records ==
In 2020 during the COVID-19 lockdown Times Tables Rock Stars and Guinness World Records announced a new title; Highest Score achieved on Times Tables Rock Stars in one minute. Out of the initial 700 official attempts accompanied with video evidence, 10-year-old Nadub Gill from Long Eaton was the fastest at 196 multiplication questions answered in one minute. He held the record until he was beaten by Brooke Cressey from Sittingbourne on 3 December 2021 when she correctly answered 210 questions in one minute.

== Awards ==
Award	Year	Title
BESA awards	2025	Team of the Year
Global EdTech Awards	2024	Best Primary curriculum resource
BETT Award	2022	Company of the Year prize for firms under £3 million
hundrED	2019	Inspiring Innovations Of 2019
Edtech 50 2018	2018	Edtech 50
Tutorful	2020	Hottest EdTech Tool
Teachertapp	2023	Gold Recommendation Award
Digital Education Awards	2023	Digital Classroom Aid of the Year
The Queen's Award	2020	Enterprise Innovation 2020

== See also ==
- Maths Week Ireland
- Education in the United Kingdom
