= Petroglyph Games =

American video game developer

Petroglyph Games, Inc.
- Type: Private
- Industry: Video games
- Founded: 2003; 23 years ago
- Founders: Joe Bostic; Michael Legg; Steve Tall
- Headquarters: Las Vegas, US
- Key people: Chuck Kroegel (CEO)
- Products: Command & Conquer Remastered Collection; Star Wars: Empire at War; Universe at War: Earth Assault; Panzer General: Allied Assault; Grey Goo
- Website: petroglyphgames.com

Petroglyph Games, Inc. is an American video game developer based in Las Vegas. It was founded in 2003 by Joe Bostic, Michael Legg and Steve Tall, programmers formerly of Westwood Studios, after that company was closed down earlier that year. They are best known for remaking Command & Conquer and Red Alert.

== History ==
Petroglyph was formed on April 1, 2003. On June 25, 2004, the company moved into their own building. On November 16, 2004, Petroglyph announced a project which they were working on, a new Star Wars real-time strategy (RTS) game called Star Wars: Empire at War, which was released on February 16, 2006.

On September 12, 2005, it was announced that they would be working for their second game on an original military/sci-fi RTS franchise with Sega. This game turned out to be Universe at War: Earth Assault, officially unveiled on January 27, 2007 and released by Sega on December 10, 2007.

On April 15, 2008, Petroglyph announced that they would be working in partnership with True Games Interactive on a Free-to-Play microtransaction based online game for PC. On December 4, 2008, True Games Interactive/Petroglyph revealed their new game is called Mytheon, to be released in 2010. On April 27, 2009, it was announced that Petroglyph would be working on a massively multiplayer online real-time strategy game (MMORTS). On March 29, 2010, Petroglyph announced Guardians of Graxia. On April 26, 2010, Trion/Petroglyph revealed that their MMORTS is called End of Nations. On June 17, 2010, Trion/Petroglyph for their End of Nations MMORTS won multiple E3 2010 Awards for Best Booth, Best MMO, Best RTS, and others.

On February 22, 2011, Petroglyph announced their free-to-play multiplayer online battle arena game title, Rise of Immortals. On January 18, 2013 Petroglyph launched social guessing game Coin a Phrase on Apple's App Store. On March 5, 2013, Petroglyph announced the launch of its Kickstarter campaign for action-strategy game Victory. On March 16, 2013, Petroglyph announced its cancellation of its Kickstarter campaign due to lack of interest. On March 13, 2014, Petroglyph announced its development of Grey Goo, a new RTS game, produced by Six Foot with publisher Grey Box.

On October 16, 2017, Petroglyph and Team17 released teaser and announcement for Forged Battalion. On January 16, 2018, it was released into early access. On November 15, 2018, EA Studios has announced a partnership with Petroglyph Games and Lemon Sky Studios for the remastering of the Command & Conquer and Red Alert series. Many of the original developers of the game who established Petroglyph Games, including composer Frank Klepacki, were on board.

== Games developed ==
Year	Title	Platform(s)	Publisher(s)
2006	Star Wars: Empire at War	macOS, Microsoft Windows	LucasArts
2007	Universe at War: Earth Assault	Microsoft Windows, Xbox 360	Sega
2009	Panzer General: Allied Assault	Xbox 360	Ubisoft
2010	Guardians of Graxia	Microsoft Windows	Petroglyph Games
2011	Mytheon	Microsoft Windows	UTV True Games
2012	Battle for Graxia	Microsoft Windows	Petroglyph Games
2013	Coin a Phrase	iOS	Petroglyph Games
2015	Grey Goo	Microsoft Windows	Grey Box
2015	Victory Command	Microsoft Windows	PlayGrid Games
2015	Battle Battalions	Microsoft Windows	Petroglyph Games
2016	8-Bit Armies	Microsoft Windows, PlayStation 4, Xbox One	Petroglyph Games, Soedesco
2016	8-Bit Hordes	Microsoft Windows, PlayStation 4, Xbox One	Petroglyph Games, Soedesco
2016	8-Bit Invaders!	Microsoft Windows, PlayStation 4, Xbox One	Petroglyph Games, Soedesco
2017	8-Bit Armies: Arena	Microsoft Windows	Petroglyph Games
2018	Forged Battalion	Microsoft Windows	Team17
2019	Conan Unconquered	Microsoft Windows	Funcom
2020	Command & Conquer Remastered Collection	Microsoft Windows	Electronic Arts
2023	The Great War: Western Front	Microsoft Windows	Frontier Foundry
2024	9-Bit Armies: A Bit Too Far	Microsoft Windows	Petroglyph Games
TBA	Earthbreakers	Microsoft Windows	Petroglyph Games
