= Guardians of Graxia =

- Developer: Petroglyph Games
- Publisher: Petroglyph Games
- Designer: George Chastain
- Composer: Frank Klepacki
- Platform: Microsoft Windows
- Release: October 2010
- Genre: Turn-based strategy
- Modes: Single-player, multiplayer

Guardians of Graxia is a video game and a board game, developed by Petroglyph Games. The game has a turn-based fantasy strategy theme in a board game-style format.
