= Trickster (board game) =

Word-based board game

- Players: 2–4
- Setup time: 2–6 minutes
- Chance: Medium (letters drawn)
- Age range: 8+
- Skills: Anagraming, bluffing, mathematics, spelling, strategy, vocabulary

Scrabble Trickster is a word game created by Mattel and announced on 6 April 2010, designed as a spin-off to one of the company's products, Scrabble. Mattel intends to sell the product in Europe starting in July 2010, but not in North America, because the company owns the rights to Scrabble and its derivatives worldwide except for in North America, where rival company Hasbro holds control of the game.

== Rule differences ==
Trickster has rules that are similar to those of Scrabble, with some notable differences. The new game occasionally allows words such as proper nouns to be used, as well as words that are spelled backwards. Players can also be allowed to "steal" letter tiles from other players. Players can only execute these moves when they place a word on specially marked squares that ask that the player draws a randomly chosen card, which contains instructions that may include one of the previously mentioned actions.

== Reception ==
The initial announcement of the new game brought forward some controversy when widespread media announcements implied that the rules to Scrabble would be changing, before learning that the new rules would in fact apply to a newly developed game. Criticism of the newly introduced variant typically refers to the game as a "dumbed down" version of Scrabble, made to appeal to more casual players who are more familiar with the names of celebrities than lesser known words from the Scrabble dictionary. Mattel acknowledges that the changes are made to appeal to a larger audience, especially to a younger audience.
