= Battle Sheep =

2010 board game

- Battle Sheep
- Designers: Francesco Rotta
- Publishers: Blue Orange Games
- Players: 2 to 4
- Setup time: <5 minutes
- Playing time: 5-30 minutes (repeatable)
- Chance: None
- Skills: Path navigation

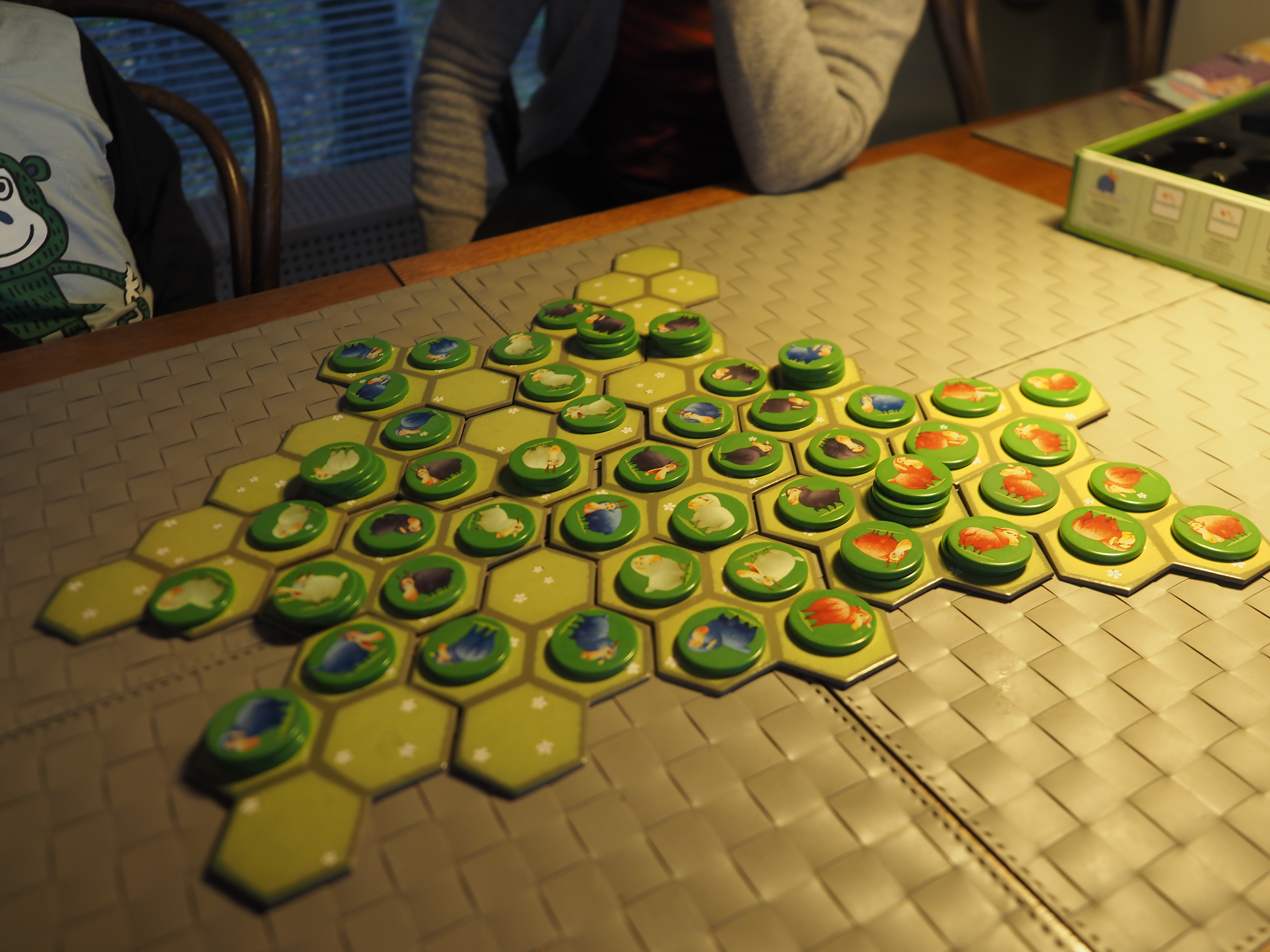
A four-player game of Battle Sheep in Lohja, Finland.

Battle Sheep is a 2010 board game developed by Francesco Rotta. It has been published by Blue Orange Games, HUCH! & friends and Lautapelit.fi.

== Rules ==
Battle Sheep is a game for two to four players. It is played on a hexagonal grid representing a pasture.

The board is made up by connecting four parts of the grid. Configurations of the board are set either randomly or by players taking turns placing pieces together until a full board is formed. The board must remain connected but may contain holes. The board may be recreated or kept constant through multiple games (It is recommended to create a smaller board layout in order to keep the individual games shorter). Each player receives sixteen sheep of a specific color and places them all, in a stack, on any free hexagon at the edge of the board.

On a player's turn, the player takes as many sheep from their own stack as they wish (provided that at least one sheep stays in place), and moves them in any direction as far as they can go, until they hit the edge of the board or other sheep. This causes the stacks to divide and the sheep to take up more space on the pasture. The play then proceeds cycling through the players, eventually skipping players who are unable to move any of their sheep.

The game ends when none of the players can move, at which point the player whose sheep take up the most space on the board wins.

Typically when playing with a constant board, multiple games are played. Each game won equals one point for the winning player. By the end of a preset number of games, whichever player has the highest points wins the overall game.

== MSO ==
Battle Sheep has featured in the Mind Sports Olympiad.

== Reception ==
Battle Sheep won multiple awards :

- 2022 Weaver Foundation Best Abstract Game Winner
- 2022 Weaver Foundation Best Abstract Game Nominee
- 2015 Årets Spil Best Family Game Winner
- 2015 Årets Spil Best Family Game Nominee
- 2014 Vuoden Peli Family Game of the Year Winner
- 2014 Spiel des Jahres Recommended
- 2014 Spiel der Spiele Hit für Familien Recommended
- 2014 Lys Enfant Finalist
