= Last Night on Earth (game) =

2007 board game

Last Night on Earth: The Zombie Game
- The cover of Last Night on Earth: The Zombie Game
- Designers: Jason C. Hill
- Illustrators: Jack Scott Hill
- Publishers: Flying Frog Productions
- Players: 2-6
- Playing time: 60-90 minutes

Last Night on Earth: The Zombie Game is a survival horror board game that was first published in 2007. Players can play on the Hero team or as the Zombies. A modular board randomly determines the layout of the town at the start of each game and there are several different scenarios to play. Seven supplements have been released.

To achieve a horror movie feel, all of the art for the game is photographic and the game comes with a CD soundtrack of original music. The game borrows from horror film stereotypes and zombie film plots.

== Game Contents ==
- 1 Full Color Rulebook
- 1 Town Center Game Board
- 6 L-Shaped Outer Boards
- 8 Unique Hero Figures (Grey)
- 14 Zombie Figures (7 Green, 7 Brown)
- 40 Card Hero Deck (Basic Game)
- 40 Card Zombie Deck (Basic Game)
- 20 Advanced Cards for the Hero Deck
- 20 Advanced Cards for the Zombie Deck
- 6 Reference Cards
- 8 Large Hero Character Sheets
- 5 Large Scenario Cards
- 2 Full Color sheets of Die-Cut Counters
- 16 Dice (12mm D6)
- 1 CD Soundtrack of Original Music

== Gameplay ==
An example of Last Night on Earth: The Zombie Game gameplay.

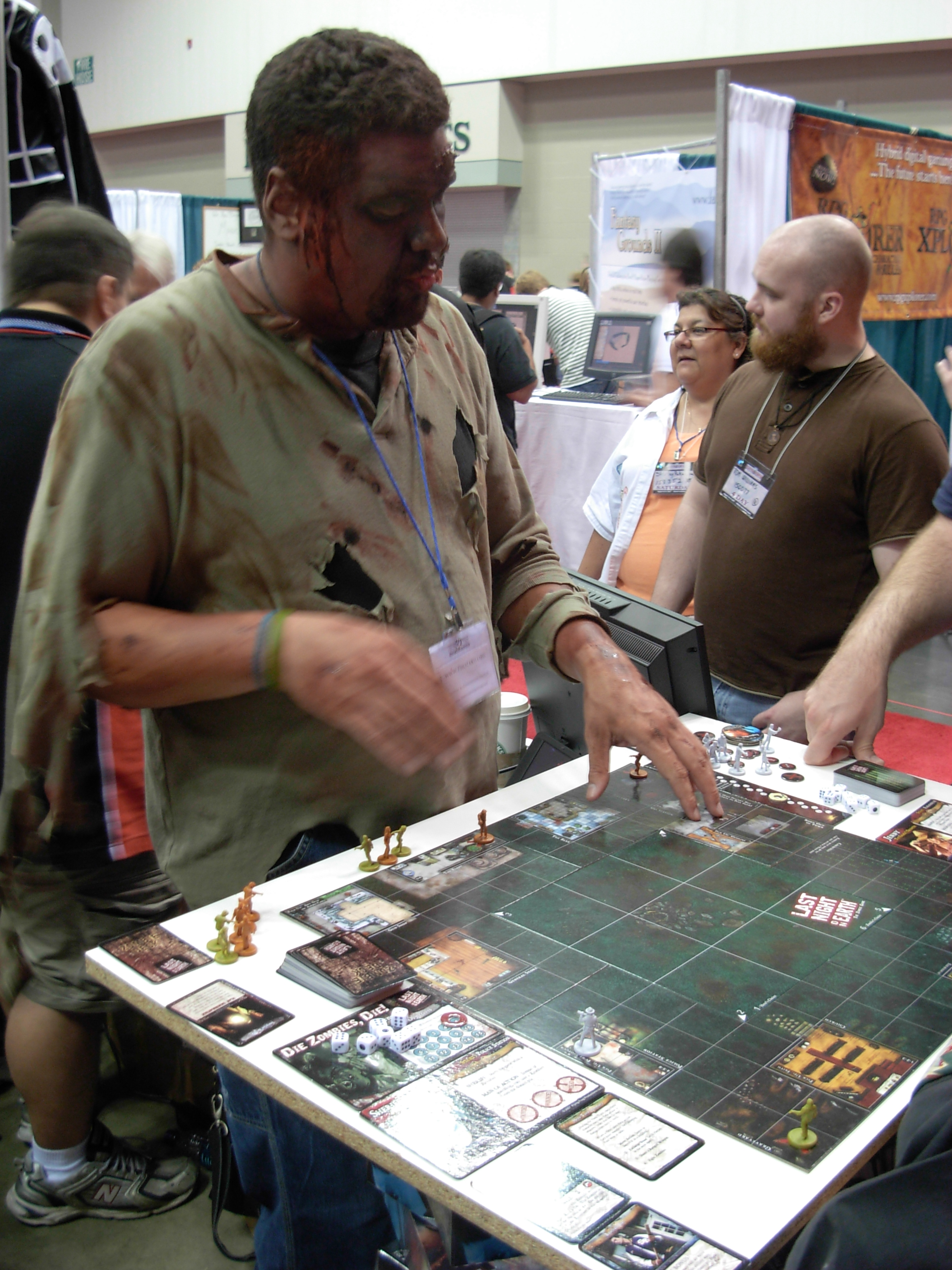
Zombie cosplayer playing Last Night on Earth: The Zombie Game at Gen Con 2007.

Before playing, the board is set up. A double-sided square board, with the Town Center on one side and the Manor House on the other, is placed either side up depending on the scenario. Four L-shaped boards are then randomly chosen and placed around the center square.

Players are split into two teams, the Zombies and the Heroes. Up to two Zombie players and four Hero players can play and players are split into teams differently depending on the number of players. Four Hero characters are chosen randomly by the Hero team and split amongst the players. Depending on the scenario, each Hero character has their own starting location, special rules, and number of wounds they can take before they are dead. Zombie players roll a die to determine how many Zombies are placed on the board before play.

A Scenario then needs to be chosen, randomly or by vote. Each Scenario has a certain limit of turns, winning conditions, and other objectives.

Each team has their own deck of cards. The Hero Deck contains Events and Items, and the Zombie Deck contains Zombie Events. Each Hero character can only hold four Items at a time, two of them being Weapons. Cards may be played at any time, unless noted on the card or after a card has caused dice to be rolled.

Gameplay is split into two turns, the Zombie Turn and the Hero Turn. On the Zombie Turn, the Sun Track marker is moved to show the number of turns that have been taken so far. Zombie players then draw cards to bring their collective hand of cards up to four. They have the option of discarding one card per player at this point. Up to 14 Zombie miniatures can be in play at one time. To determine if more Zombies are spawned, two dice are rolled and if the sum is higher than the number of Zombies on the board, more Zombies are placed later in the turn. Zombies on the board are each moved up to one square on the board. Building walls do not block movement of the Zombies. If any of these moves causes a Zombie to be in a square adjacent from a Hero character, they automatically move into the same space.

Any Zombie in the same square as a Hero must now fight them. A Zombie player rolls one die, but wins on a tie and the Hero player rolls two dice and uses their higher number. If the Hero wins the fight, the Zombie is "fended off" but remains in place. If a Hero rolls doubles, however, the Zombie is killed and removed from the board. Cards, such as Hand Weapons or Events may be used to change the outcome of a fight.

The Zombie players now roll a die to see how many new Zombies are spawned, up to 6. When spawning Zombies they must be placed on one of the four Spawning Pits. Each L-shaped board has a single Spawning Pit. Before placing more than one Zombie on a Spawning Pit, each of the four Spawning Pits must first contain one of the newly spawned Zombies.

On the Hero Turn each Hero character takes their turn separately in any character order they wish. They first move or search. To move, a die is rolled and the Hero may move up to that many spaces. Some buildings have "Pick Ups", that let the player take a specific Item out of the discard pile instead of the top of the Hero Deck. If a Hero is in the same space as another Hero, Items may be exchanged between the characters. A ranged attack may now be made if the Hero has a Ranged Weapon. Each Ranged Weapon has a specific range and die roll needed to be successful. If successful, the Zombie is killed and removed from play. The Hero must now fight any Zombies sharing their space, as described in the Zombie Turn. Once all Hero characters have completed their individual turn, the Hero Turn ends.

Either team wins by completing their Scenario Objective. In addition, the Zombie team wins automatically by killing four Hero characters or causing the last card of the Hero Deck to be discarded. Depending on the Scenario, one team loses if they do not complete their Scenario Objective before the turn limit has been reached.

== Expansions ==
=== Growing Hunger (2008) ===
The Growing Hunger expansion adds three new scenarios as well as a two player mini-game. It introduces new game mechanics including a modular 'Dots' system to incorporate different rules to any existing scenario. It includes four new Heroes, as well as seven new red Zombies for use as Plague Carriers, Grave Dead, or to increase the Zombie Horde to 21 instead of the normal 14. New modular game board sections expand the town and feature unique buildings such as the Supermarket, Library, and Antique Shop. New game cards let Zombie players steal weapons from the Heroes and add more powerful double-handed weapons to the Heroes arsenal, such as Garden Shears and the Fence Post. Also included are two new die-cut counter sheets adding Free Search Markers for the Heroes as well as many other counters to the Last Night on Earth toolbox for use with official web content or creating custom scenarios.

=== Survival of the Fittest (2010) ===
This expansion includes three new card decks, as well as new game mechanics and several new scenarios. The Hero players can now find Unique Items as well as the use of Survival Tactics. Heroes can also fortify building with Barricades to hinder Zombie movement. The Zombie players now has access to Grave Weapons. These three new decks (Unique Items, Survival Tactics, and Grave Weapons) can be integrated into all existing scenarios using the same modular 'Dots' system first introduced in the Growing Hunger expansion. Survival of the Fittest also includes new cards for the main Hero and Zombie decks as well as additional full color counters for the Last Night on Earth toolbox.

=== Timber Peak (2012) ===
A group of survivors escape Woodinvale and reach a small logging and mining town of Timber Peak. This is a standalone expansion and includes everything needed to play, or can be incorporated as a regular expansion. Timber Peak includes a double-sided town center board and 6 L-shaped outer boards along with 6 new survivors and 14 zombie miniatures. It also includes new Hero and Zombie decks. In addition, it also includes Upgrade card decks for both Heroes and Zombies and 4 new scenarios. It was released in late 2012.

=== Blood in the Forest (2013) ===
This expansion includes 3 scenarios, new cards, 2 new heroes, modular forest board, 15 new hero upgrade cards, and 6 new zombie upgrade cards. It can be played with either Timber Peak or Last Night on Earth. This expansion also introduces, for the first time, Zombie Champions. These zombie champions are the Feral Dead and the Zombie Behemoth, and are more powerful and faster than normal zombies.

== Hero Pack ==
- Hero Pack 1 (2010)

Features four new Heroes. Characters are Victor the Escaped Prisoner, Jade the High school Outcast, Mr. Goddard the Chemistry Teacher and Stacy the intrepid reporter. A new scenario "Hunt for Survivors", and five new hero and zombie cards each.

- Hero Pack 2 (2017)

Features four new Heroes. Characters are Angela the Cheerleader, Bear the Biker, Dr. Yamato the Chemical Engineer, and Maria the Bookworm. A new scenario "Left Behind", and 10 new hero and zombie cards each.

== Game Supplements ==
- Stock Up! (2007)

Features a new scenario "Stock Up!", and five new hero and zombie cards each. The first appearance of the game mechanic, "Sacrifice".

- Revenge of the Dead (2008)

Features a new scenario "Revenge of the Dead", and five new hero and zombie cards each.

- Zombie Pillage (2009)

Features a new scenario "Zombie Pillage", and five new hero and zombie cards each. The first appearance of the game mechanic, "Pillage".

- Radioactive Grave Dead (2009)

Features seven new crystal green Zombie miniatures and a new scenario, "It Fell From the Sky". Uses the Dots system first introduced in the Growing Hunger Expansion. Also a miniature only variant (no rules or scenario) was made available in December 2010.

- Zombies with Grave Weapons (2010)

Features new Zombie miniatures for use with the Grave Weapons deck included in the Survival of the Fittest expansion. Fourteen plastic Zombie miniatures with seven new sculpts, in two different colors. Included are two new Grave weapon cards, miniatures and counters for "Crawling Torso".

- Advanced Abilities (2010)

Features eight new game cards for the Zombie and Hero Decks and twenty new Advanced Ability cards (sixteen Hero and four Zombie) as well as the new rules for using them.

- Hold the Line! (2013)

Features a new scenario "Hold the Line!", and five new hero and zombie cards each.

- Airstrike (2014)

Features a new scenario "Airstrike", and five new hero and zombie cards each.

== Invasion From Outer Space ==
Published in 2010, this is a stand-alone game that can be played separately or with the Last Night on Earth game as an expansion. Set in the 1940s middle America, A legion of Martians landed on Earth and is causing havoc at a traveling carnival. Now it's up to the carnival performers to defend the planet from invasion. Players can play on the Carnival Heroes team or as the Martians. It is for 2-6 players and features a double-sided Big Top center board, 8 L-shaped boards, 5 scenarios, 8 Hero figures, 19 Martian figures and a large Zard Beast martian figure. The game also includes a CD soundtrack of original music. The gameplay is similar to Last Night on Earth as the Carnival Heroes try to complete the scenario objective before the turn limit is reached or the Martians kill 4 heroes.

== Miniature Sets ==
- Zombie Miniature Set

Features seven zombie miniatures in seven different colors, with one brown (original game), one green (original game), one dark red (Growing Hunger expansion), one purple, one black, one crystal blue, and one crystal red.

- Zombies With Grave Weapons Miniature Set

Features fourteen zombie miniatures in two sets of seven unique figure sculpts provided in both brown and green. The shapes are Machete, Crawling Torso, Rusty Axe, Old Pitchfork, Barbed Wire, Bloated Body, and Sickle.

- Radioactive Zombies With Grave Weapons Miniature Set

Features seven zombie miniatures in crystal green/radioactive color with the same seven unique figure sculpts from Zombie with Grave Weapons Miniature Set. The shapes again are Machete, Crawling Torso, Rusty Axe, Old Pitchfork, Barbed Wire, Bloated Body, and Sickle.

- Red Zombies With Grave Weapons Miniature Set

Features seven zombie miniatures in red color with the same seven unique figure sculpts from Zombie with Grave Weapons Miniature Set. The shapes again are Machete, Crawling Torso, Rusty Axe, Old Pitchfork, Barbed Wire, Bloated Body, and Sickle.

== Specials ==
- Special Edition Soundtrack CD (2007)

Features 16 tracks of original music. This includes the original soundtrack plus five new songs. The CD features new artwork and two exclusive game cards.

- Website Content

Free scenarios released directly through the official website. Featured scenarios are "We've Got To Go Back!", "All Hallows Eve", "Run For It!", and "All Hallows Eve 2: The Ritual".

== Awards ==
- 2007 Scrye Magazine's Player's Choice Award, Favorite New Board Game
- 2007 Dice Tower Awards, Best Small Publisher Game Nominee
- 2008 Origins Award Nominee, Board Game or Expansion of the Year
- 2008 Dice Tower Awards, Best Expansion Nominee (Growing Hunger)
- 2009 Golden Geek Awards, Best Expansion Nominee (Growing Hunger)

== Reviews ==
- Pyramid
