= Kraken-Alarm =

2010 children's game

- Designers: Oliver Igelhaut
- Publishers: Kosmos (Germany, France)
- Publication: 2010; 15 years ago
- Players: 3 to 4 (standard)
- Playing time: 20 minutes
- Chance: high
- Skills: Concentration

Kraken-Alarm is a children's board game designed by the German board game designer Oliver Igelhaut. The game was published in 2010 by Kosmos in Germany and later as SOS Octopus in France. Within the game the players take the role as an expedition team in a sea region where an octopus father lives with his son. Every time when the boat gets near to the son the octopus father throws its tentacle and if the player is unlucky it hits his boat. The game concept is based on a Concentration where the players have to remember animal chips in the sea area mode combined with a phase of luck while the tentacle swings.

The game is designed for two to four players and lasts approximately 20 minutes. In 2010 it won the German board game award on children's games (Deutscher Kinderspiele Preis) and was nominated to the critics' prize Kinderspiel des Jahres. In the next year it won the French As d'Or – Jeu de l'Année enfant as SOS Octopus and was nominated to the Danish Guldbrikken Award in 2012.
