= 51st State (board game) =

Board game published by Portal Games

51st State is a 2010 post-apocalyptic themed card-driven strategy board game published by Polish company Portal Games and designed by Ignacy Trzewiczek. The game received several expansions, a second edition titled 51st State: Master Set in 2016 and a third edition titled 51st State Ultimate Edition in 2023.
