= Thunderstone (card game) =

Deck-building card game

- Box cover of Thunderstone Base Set
- Designers: Mike Elliott
- Publishers: Alderac Entertainment Group
- Players: 1 to 5 players
- Setup time: ~30 minutes
- Playing time: ~60 minutes
- Chance: Medium
- Age range: 12 & up
- Skills: Resource management Turn decision

Thunderstone is a fantasy deck-building card game series designed by Mike Elliott, with artwork by Jason Engle. It was first published by Alderac Entertainment Group in 2009. Each card has dimensions of 6.3 by 8.8 centimetres (2.5 in × 3.5 in). It has been translated into several languages.

== Gameplay ==
Gameplay involves building a deck of adventurers and equipment to defeat monsters. Each turn players must decide whether to visit the Village (to purchase cards, upgrade heroes and other actions), or if they will face a monster in the current dungeon (using the heroes and equipment in their hand). Defeated monsters are added to a player's deck as well, where they may contribute money and/or other bonuses when in hand.

== Thunderstone Advance ==
Many game elements including the card layout were redesigned in 2012. This resulted in the game series continuing under the new name Thunderstone Advance. Cards from the original series and the Advance series are compatible as they share the same back cover artwork. In the Thunderstone Advance series, each set comes with a handful of Thunderstone Bearers that act as monster bosses in the game.

== Thunderstone Quest (2017) ==
Thunderstone Quest introduced new play modes. The game will tell a specific story with a series of pre-set dungeon tiles, monsters, heroes and support cards. Each will come with a series of mini-adventures and a story booklet that tells players what happens as they progress through the scenarios.

Once players have completed the quests they will be able to enjoy great replay value with the available selection of monsters, heroes, and support cards, as well as the new dungeon tiles, by choosing random set-ups before the start of play. Aside from heroes such as wizards, fighters, rogues, and clerics, cards will include supplies that heroes need like weapons, spells, items, or light to reach further into the dungeon.

The dungeon deck is created by combining several different groups of monsters together. Certain groups of monsters may be more or less susceptible to different hero types, so players have to take this into account when they choose what to buy.

== Releases ==
The games denoted as B contain Base cards (Militia/Regulars, Daggers/Longspears, Torches, etc) and experience cards (tokens in Advance) and can therefore be played standalone.

=== Original series ===
Name	Release Date	Type	Total Cards	Types of Cards	Extras
Thunderstone (Base game)^{B}	2009	Stand-alone	530	1 Thunderstone card 5 Reference cards 32 Experience Point cards 38 Randomizer cards 80 Monster cards 90 Basic cards (including Disease); 132 Hero cards 152 Village cards	50 Card Dividers
Thunderstone: Wrath of the Elements	2010	Expansion	340	1 Thunderstone card 5 Reference cards 12 Trap cards 33 Randomizer cards 42 Basic cards (incl. extra Disease cards); 51 Monster cards 84 Hero cards 112 Village cards	76 Card Dividers
Thunderstone: Doomgate Legion	2010	Expansion	317	1 Thunderstone card 12 Treasure cards 30 Randomizer cards 25 card Special Disease deck 60 Monster cards 84 Hero cards 104 Village cards 1 Guardian card	28 Card Dividers
Thunderstone: Dragonspire^{B}	2011	Stand-alone and Expansion	630	2 Thunderstone cards 5 Reference cards 46 Randomizer cards 16 Special Dungeon Feature cards 103 Past set Randomizer cards Basic cards 84 Basic cards 80 Monster cards 141 Hero cards 144 Village cards 7 Setting cards 2 Guardian cards	53 Card Dividers; 1 Dungeon Board (use is optional); 30 Experience Point (XP) Tokens
Thunderstone: Thornwood Siege	2011	Expansion	284	1 Thunderstone card 90 Hero cards 112 Village cards 50 Monster cards 1 Guardian card 30 Randomizer cards	27 Card dividers 18 Tokens
Thunderstone: Heart of Doom	2011	Expansion	302	1 Thunderstone card 84 Hero cards 104 Village cards 6 Treasure cards 70 Monster cards 3 Guardian cards 3 Setting cards 31 Randomizer cards	29 Card dividers
Thunderstone: Promo Pack	2011	Promo	17	6 Harruli Initiate; 4 Harruli Spellsword; 2 Harruli Avatar; 1 Harruli Randomizer; 1 Blade Trap (Trap - Death); 1 Mammoth (Evil Druid - Familiar); 1 Death Sentinel (Doomknight - Sentinel); 1 Vision (Cultist - Humanoid)	
Thunderstone: For the Dwarf Promo	2010	Promo	13	6 Clan Sergeant; 4 Clan Commander; 2 Clan Champion; 1 Clan randomizer	
Thunderstone: Werewolf Promo Pack	2011	Promo	14	1 Void Apocalypse (Hydra - Dragon); 1 Thornwood Forest (Setting); 1 Guardian of Revenge (Guardian); 1 Werewolf Randomizer; 1 Istvan Torok (Werewolf); 2 Direhowl (Werewolf); 2 Ragetalon (Werewolf); 2 Wolf Pack (Werewolf); 3 Grimbite (Werewolf)	
Thunderstone: Promo Pack #2	2011	Promo	13	1 Guardian of Strength (Guardian); 1 Stormhold (Setting); 2 Skywyrm Warrior (Dragon - Humanoid); 2 Skywyrm Mage (Dragon - Humanoid); 3 Skywyrm Scavenger (Dragon - Humanoid); 1 Skywyrm Overlord (Dragon - Humanoid); 2 Skywyrm Priest (Dragon - Humanoid); 1 Dragon Humanoid Randomizer	

=== Thunderstone Advance series ===
Name	Release Date	Type	Total Cards	Types of Cards	Extras/Notes
Thunderstone Advance: Towers of Ruin^{B}	2012	Stand-alone and Expansion	566	95 Basic card 132 Hero cards 100 Monster cards 3 Thunderstone Bearer cards 152 Village cards 45 Special cards 39 Randomizer cards	50 Card Dividers; 1 Dungeon Board; 50 Experience Point (XP) Tokens Currently out of print
Thunderstone Advance: Caverns of Bane	2012	Expansion	282	84 Hero cards 60 Monster cards 3 Thunderstone Bearer cards 104 Village cards 4 Special cards 6 Treasure cards 27 Randomizer cards	27 Card Dividers
Thunderstone Advance: Root of Corruption	2012	Expansion	336	84 Hero cards 72 Monster cards 1 Thunderstone Bearer card 1 Guardian card 120 Village cards 6 Treasure of Dun Ordha cards 4 Special cards 30 Randomizer cards 18 Reprinted cards	30 Card Dividers; 1 Siege Poster
Thunderstone Advance: Avatars	2012	Expansion	25	25 Avatar cards	
Thunderstone Advance: Starter Set^{B}	2013	Stand-alone and Expansion	259	70 Basic cards 60 Hero cards 30 Monster cards 1 Thunderstone Bearer card 80 Village cards 18 Randomizer cards	24 Card Dividers
Thunderstone Advance: Numenera^{B}	2013	Stand-alone and Expansion	602	81 Basic card 156 Hero cards 100 Monster cards 1 Thunderstone Bearer card 6 Treasure card 168 Village cards 45 Special cards 45 Randomizer cards	55 Card Dividers; 6 Oversized Setting cards 1 Dungeon Board; 54 Experience Point (XP) Tokens; 1 Experience Point (XP) Bag; 40 Mark Tokens
Thunderstone Advance: Worlds Collide^{B}	2013	Stand-alone and Expansion	550	91 Basic cards 132 Hero cards 152 Village cards 100 Monster cards 4 Guardian cards 30 Disease cards 41 Randomizer cards	The set showcases 550 cards from the first six Thunderstone releases, including some of the previously hard to find promos, all updated and fully compatible with Thunderstone Advance. 63 Card Dividers
Thunderstone Advance: Into the Abyss	2014	Expansion	381	128 Hero cards 80 Monster cards 136 Village cards 33 Randomizer cards 4 Guardian cards	33 Card Dividers

The Worlds Collide and Into the Abyss sets are selection of cards from the original series (Thunderstone and its 5 expansions), redesigned to match with the Advance series. Also many cards have been tweaked for more balance.

== Reception ==
BoardGameGeek rates Thunderstone a 7.0 out of 10, garnering it a thematic rank of 177 out of over 500 "thematic" board games.

== Awards ==
- 2012 Juego del Año Tico Nominee
- 2011 Fairplay À la carte Winner
- 2010 JoTa Best Card Game Nominee
- 2010 JoTa Best Card Game Critic Award
- 2010 JoTa Best Card Game Audience Award
- 2010 Japan Boardgame Prize Voters' Selection Nominee
- 2010 Golden Geek Best Card Game Nominee
